= Arjuna =

Hero of the Indian epic Mahabharata

- Mahabharata character
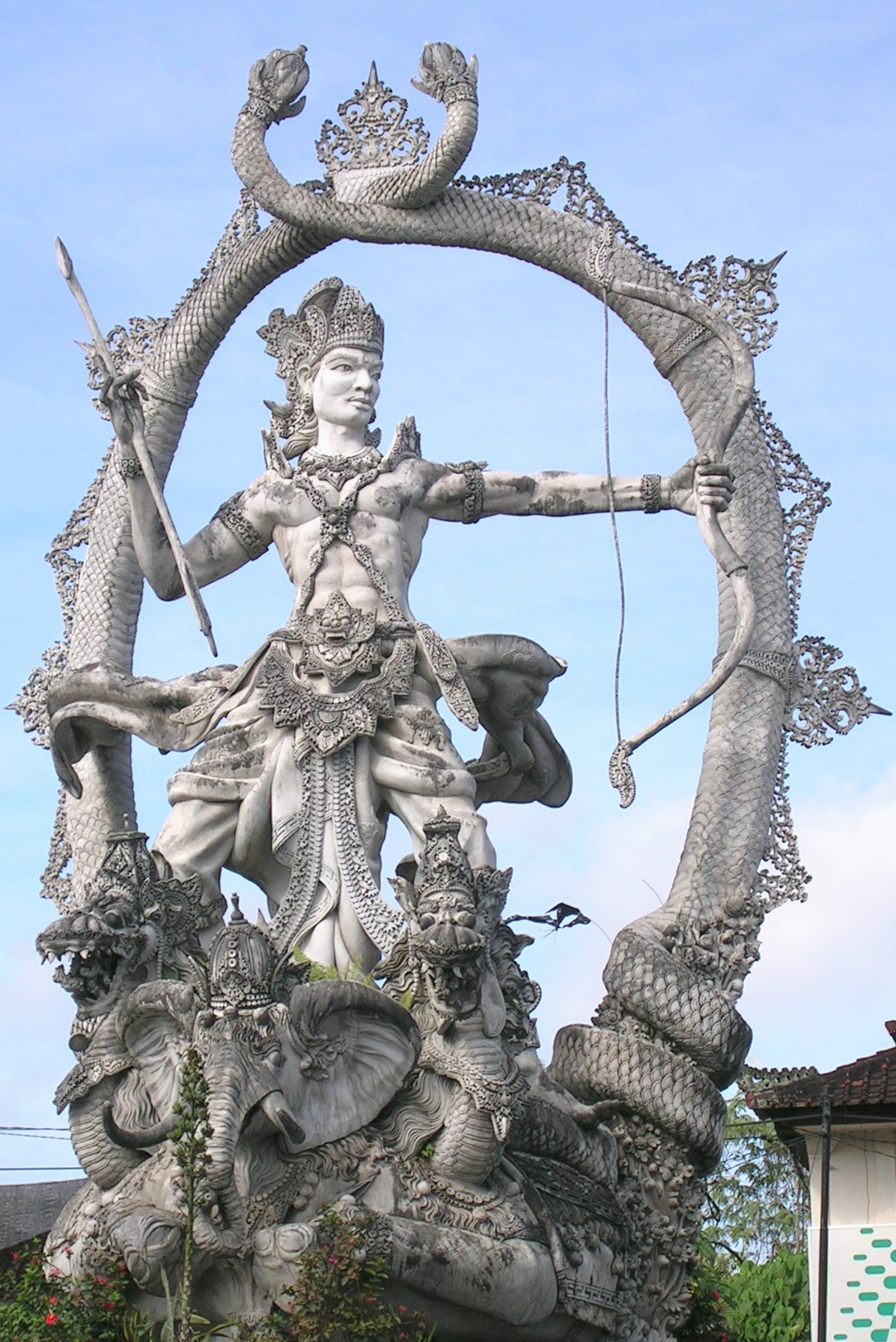
- A statue of Arjuna in Bali
- Texts: Mahabharata (Bhagavad Gita); Aṣṭādhyāyī; Puranas

Information
- Aliases: Kaunteya; Partha; Phalguna; Jishnu; Kiriti; Shvetavahana; Bibhatsu; Vijaya; Krishna; Savyasachi; Dhananjaya
- Affiliation: Pandavas; Nara-Narayana
- Weapon: Gandiva; Pashupatastra
- Family: Indra (father); Kunti (mother); Pandu (legal father); Madri (step-mother); Karna (brother); Yudhishthira (brother); Bhima (brother); Nakula (half-brother); Sahadeva (half-brother)
- Spouses: Draupadi; Ulupi; Chitrangada; Subhadra
- Children: Iravan by Ulupi; Babhruvahana by Chitrangada; Abhimanyu by Subhadra; Shrutakarma by Draupadi
- Relatives: Kauravas (paternal cousins); Krishna and Balarama (maternal cousins); Dhritarashtra and Vidura (paternal uncles)
- Home: Kuru Kingdom
- Dynasty: Chandravamsha

Arjuna (Sanskrit: अर्जुन, IAST: Arjuna) is one of the central characters of the ancient Hindu epic Mahabharata. He is the third oldest of the five Pandava brothers and is widely recognised as the most distinguished among them. He is the son of Indra, the king of the gods, and Kunti, wife of King Pandu of Kuru dynasty, making him a divine-born hero. Arjuna is famed for his extraordinary prowess in archery and mastery over celestial weapons. Throughout the epic, Arjuna sustains a close friendship with his maternal cousin, Krishna, who serves as his mentor and spiritual guide.

Arjuna is celebrated for numerous heroic exploits throughout the epic. From an early age, he distinguishes himself as an exceptional student under the tutelage of the revered warrior-sage Drona. In his youth, Arjuna secured the hand of Draupadi, the princess of Panchala, by excelling in her Swayamvar. Subsequently, during a period of temporary exile prompted by a breach of a fraternal agreement, Arjuna embarked on a journey during which he entered into matrimonial alliances with three princesses: Ulupi, Chitrangada, and Subhadra. From these unions, he fathered four sons: Shrutakarma, Iravan, Babhruvahana and Abhimanyu. Arjuna plays a major role in establishing his elder brother Yudhishthira’s sovereignty, subduing numerous kingdoms and setting fire to the forest of Khandavaprastha. When the Pandavas are deceitfully exiled after being tricked into forfeiting their kingdom by their envious cousins, the Kauravas, Arjuna vows to kill Karna, a key Kaurava ally and Arjuna's main rival who is later revealed to be his elder half-brother, for publicly shaming Draupadi. During exile, Arjuna undertakes a journey to acquire divine weapons and earns the favour of the God Shiva. Beyond his martial prowess, Arjuna was also ambidexterous (Sanskrit: सव्यसाची, romanized: savyasācī), skilled in music and dance, which enabled him to disguise himself as a eunuch teacher of princess Uttarā of Matsya during his final year of exile. During this period, he also defeats the entire Kuru army.

Before the Kurukshetra War, Arjuna, despite his valour, became deeply demoralised upon seeing his own relatives and revered teachers aligned with the opposing Kaurava side and struggled with the idea of killing them. Faced with a profound moral dilemma, he turns to Krishna, who serves as his charioteer. Krishna imparts him the knowledge of the Bhagavad Gita, counseling him on his duty (dharma) as a warrior, karma and liberation through devotion. In this moment of spiritual revelation, Arjuna is granted a vision of Krishna’s cosmic divine form, known as the Vishvarupa. During the war, Arjuna, wielding the celestial bow Gandiva, emerges as a key warrior, responsible for the fall and death of several formidable foes, including Bhishma and Karna. After the war, he assists Yudhishthira in consolidating his empire through Ashvamedha. In this episode, Arjuna is slain by his own son, Babruvahana, but is revived through the intervention of Ulupi. Before the onset of the Kali Yuga, Arjuna performs the last rites of Krishna and other Yadavas. He, along with brothers and Draupadi, then undertakes his final journey to the Himalayas, where he ultimately succumbs. The Kuru dynasty continues through Arjuna's grandson, Parikshit.

Arjuna remains as an epitome of heroism, chivalry, and devotion in the Hindu tradition. He particularly holds a prominent place within the Krishna-centric Vaishnava sect of Hinduism, further elevated by his pivotal role in Bhagavad Gita, which becomes a central scripture of Hindu philosophy. Beyond the Mahabharata, Arjuna is mentioned in early works such as the Aṣṭādhyāyī (likely composed in the 5th or 6th century BCE), which mentions his worship alongside Vasudeva-Krishna, as well as in the Puranas and a multitude of regional and folk traditions across India and Indonesia. His story has been an inspiration for various arts, performances and secondary literature.

== Etymology and epithets ==
According to Monier Monier-Williams, the word Arjuna means white, clear or silver. But Arjuna is known by many other names, such as:

- Dhanañjaya (धनञ्जय) – one who conquered wealth and gold
- Guḍākesha (गुडाकेश) – one who has conquered sleep (the lord of sleep, Gudaka+isha) or one who has abundant hair (Guda-kesha).
- Vijaya (विजय) – always victorious, invincible and undefeatable
- Savyasāchī (सव्यसाची)– one who can shoot arrows using the right and the left hand with equal activity; Ambidextrous.
- Shvetavāhana (श्वेतवाहन) – one with milky white horses mounted to his pure white chariot
- Bībhatsu (बीभत्सु) – one who always fights wars in a fair, stylish and terrific manner and never does anything horrible in the war
- Kirīṭī (किरीटी) – one who wears the celestial diadem presented by the King of Gods, Indra
- Jiṣṇu (जिष्णु) – triumphant, conqueror of enemies
- Phālguṇa (फाल्गुण) – born under the star Uttara Phalguni (Denebola in Leo)
- Mahābāhu (महाबाहु) – one with large and strong arms
- Gāṇḍīvadhārī (गाण्डीवधारी) – holder of a bow named Gandiva
- Pārtha (पार्थ) – son of Pritha (or Kunti) – after his mother
- Kaunteya (कौन्तेय) – son of Kunti – after his mother
- Pāṇḍuputra (पाण्डुपुत्र) – son of Pandu – after his father
- Pāṇḍava (पाण्डव) – son of Pandu – after his father
- Kṛṣṇa (कृष्ण) – He who is of dark complexion and conducts great purity.
- Bṛhannalā (बृहन्नला) – another name assumed by Arjuna for the 13th year in exile
- Anagha (अनघ) – Sinless
- Bhārat (भारत) – descendant of Bharat
- Parantap (परन्तप) – scourge of foes

== Literary background ==
The story of Arjuna is told in the Mahabharata, one of the Sanskrit epics from the Indian subcontinent. The work is written in Classical Sanskrit and is a composite work of revisions, editing and interpolations over many centuries. The oldest parts in the surviving version of the text may date to near 400 BCE.

The Mahabharata manuscripts exist in numerous versions, wherein the specifics and details of major characters and episodes vary, often significantly. Except for the sections containing the Bhagavad Gita which is remarkably consistent between the numerous manuscripts, the rest of the epic exists in many versions. The differences between the Northern and Southern recensions are particularly significant, with the Southern manuscripts more profuse and longer. Scholars have attempted to construct a critical edition, relying mostly on a study of the "Bombay" edition, the "Poona" edition, the "Calcutta" edition and the "south Indian" editions of the manuscripts. The most accepted version is one prepared by scholars led by Vishnu Sukthankar at the Bhandarkar Oriental Research Institute, preserved at Kyoto University, Cambridge University and various Indian universities.

== Biography ==
=== Birth and early life ===
Arjuna is half-divine by birth, being the son of a human queen and the king of devas (gods). He is one of the five Pandava brothers, who are recognized as the sons of Pandu. However, the Pandavas were each fathered by different devas through the practice of niyoga, a custom in which a revered man may father a child on behalf of another who is deceased or incapable of procreation. Although Pandu was of royal lineage, belonging to the Lunar dynasty and having once ruled as king of the Kuru kingdom, he was rendered impotent due to a curse that would result in his death were he to engage in sexual relations. (Note: Despite being the younger brother of Dhritarashtra, it was Pandu who succeeded their father as king of Bharata. This was because Dhritarashtra was blind, a disability that caused him to forfeit his right to the royal succession. Dhritarashtra fathered 100 sons, known as the Kaurava brothers, and ascended the throne after Pandu went on self imposed exile to forest.) To circumvent this curse, Pandu's wife Kunti utilized a sacred mantra granted to her by the sage Durvasa during her maidenhood. This mantra enabled her to invoke various gods to beget children. At Pandu’s behest, she first summoned Dharma and Vayu, resulting in the births of Yudhishthira and Bhima respectively. Each child was born a year apart. Arjuna was the third son, conceived through the invocation of the god Indra, with whom he remains connected throughout his life.

The Adi Parva, the first book of the Mahabharata, narrates Arjuna's birth. Prior to Arjuna’s birth, Pandu deduces that he would get the best son from Indra, the Vedic storm-sky god and king of the gods, and performs intense austerities to propitiate, desiring that the king of the gods father his third. Pleased by Pandu's devotion, Indra appears before him and promises to grant a son who will achieve fame across the three worlds. When Kunti invokes Indra through the mantra, Indra, assuming human form, approaches her and begets a son. His birth is marked by the appearance of a significantly greater number of sages and celestial beings—including adityas, rudras, saptarishis, gandharvas, apsaras, etc., compared to those present at the births of his elder brothers, indicating his far-superior prominence in the narrative. A divine voice praises him and prophesizes his future heroic deeds and names him Arjuna, while drums are heard, and flowers fall from the sky. Arjuna is born under the auspicious lunar constellation of Phalguna.

Arjuna, along with his two elder brothers and two younger half-brothers, is raised in the forests of Shatashringa (lit. 'hundred peaked mountain') under the care of the resident sages. Following the deaths of Pandu and his second wife, Madri, Kunti returns to Hastinapura, the capital of the Kuru Kingdom, with all five sons. According to the Southern Recension of the Mahabharata, Pandu dies on Arjuna’s birthday.

=== Education and training ===
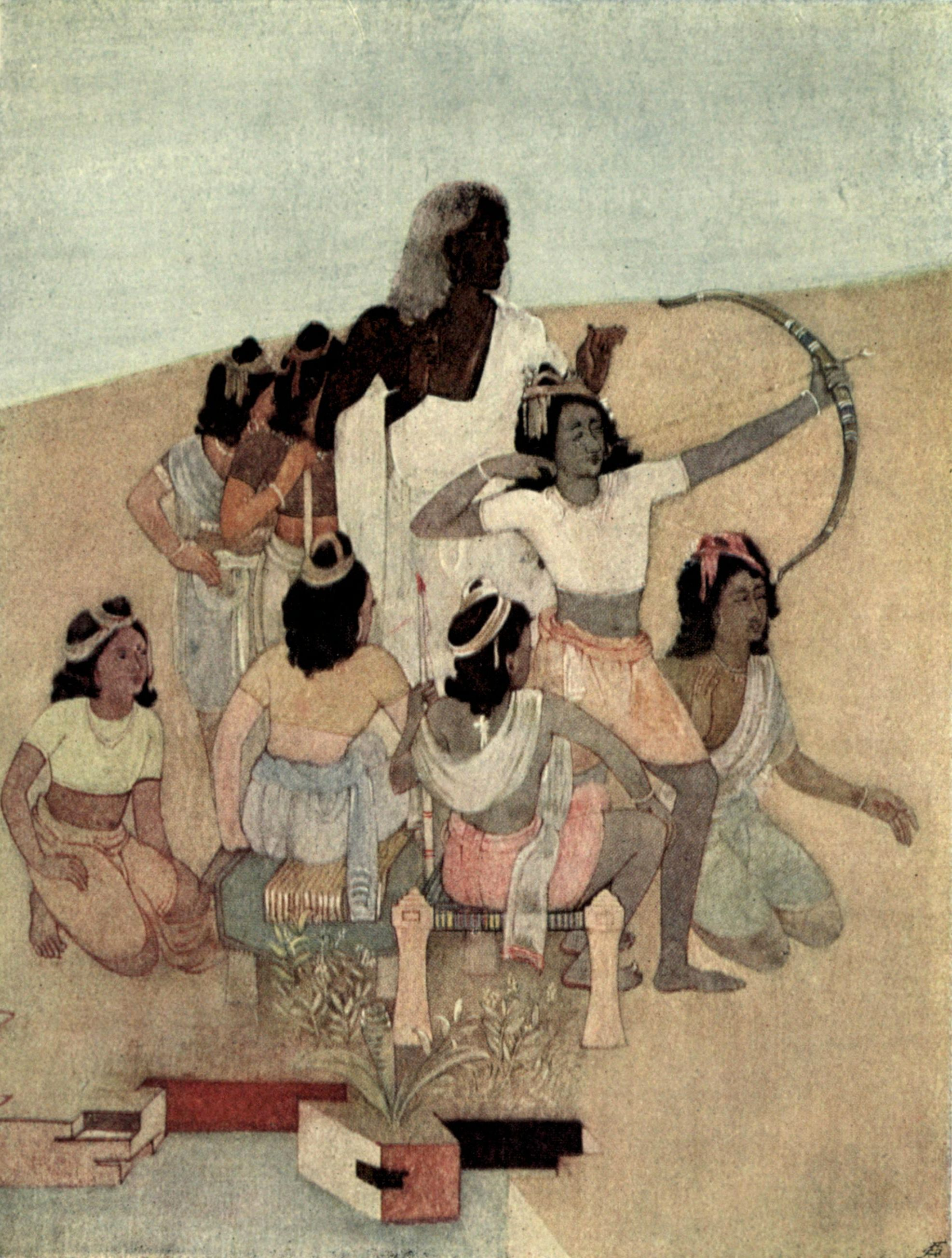
The Trial of the Princes by Nandalal Bose, depicting the toy-bird episode; Arjuna and Drona are in the center

In Hastinapura, Arjuna and his brothers are brought up alongside their paternal cousins, the Kauravas. Their early education in archery is entrusted to Kripacharya, the royal preceptor, under the overall supervision of Bhishma, the grand patriarch of the Kuru dynasty. Soon after, the Brahmin warrior Drona is appointed to instruct the princes in the arts of warfare and martial discipline. Upon his first encounter with them, Drona asks that they repay him a favour in the future. While the other princes remain silent, Arjuna alone gives his assent, which deeply pleases Drona. Arjuna quickly distinguishes himself as the most skilled and devoted among Drona’s pupils, eventually becoming his favourite and favoured student. When Arjuna's preeminence is seemingly challenged by a tribal boy Ekalavya, Drona takes steps to ensure that Arjuna remains the greatest of his students.

The Mahabharata presents several episodes that affirm Arjuna’s distinction as Drona’s most accomplished and devoted disciple. On one occasion, Drona is seemingly attacked by a crocodile, but Arjuna reacts the fastest, rescuing his teacher. Impressed by his presence of mind and alacrity, Drona rewards him with the Brahmashira, a powerful celestial weapon (astra). This marks the beginning of Arjuna’s acquisition of divine armaments, and it is at this moment that Drona declares, “No other man in the world will be an archer like you”. In another episode, Drona tests the perceptiveness and concentration of his pupils through an archery trial. He places an artificial bird atop a tree and asks each student what they perceive. The princes respond by describing both the target and its surroundings, but Drona is dissatisfied with their answers. When Arjuna is questioned, he replies that he sees only the bird’s head—demonstrating absolute focus and singular vision. Drona is pleased, and this refined capacity for perception and precision becomes emblematic of Arjuna’s unique abilities. (Note: The Southern and other vulgate recensions include additional episodes. In one, Drona begins advanced lessons for his son Ashvatthama while sending others to fetch water. Perceiving this, Arjuna returns early with Ashvatthama to receive the same training. Impressed by his insight and dedication, Drona instructs both students in specialised techniques. Another episode recounts that one day, a gust of wind extinguishes the lamp while Arjuna is eating, yet he continues instinctively. Realising that archery, too, can be mastered in darkness, he begins practising at night.)

Once Drona is satisfied with the progress of his pupils, he organises a public exhibition of martial skills, attended by members of the royal court, the Kuru clan, and the citizens of Hastinapura. Arjuna makes a dramatic entrance, and Drona publicly proclaims him his favourite disciple. The crowd responds with enthusiastic acclaim, celebrating Arjuna, who demonstrates his command over divine weaponry, manipulating elemental forces such as fire, wind, water, and rain. It is during this event that Karna, who later becomes Arjuna’s principal rival, first challenges him. From this moment onward, the two figures are consistently portrayed as adversaries within the epic’s narrative structure. (Note: According to scholar Kevin McGrath, while both Arjuna and Karna are depicted as supreme warriors, the Mahabharata characterises Arjuna as possessing supernatural qualities, whereas Karna, though formidable, remains within the bounds of the merely superhuman.)

The culmination of Arjuna's education is marked by his fulfilment of the teacher’s customary fee (gurudakshina), in accordance with Indian tradition. Drona requests as payment the defeat of his longstanding rival, King Drupada of Panchala. This task is accomplished collectively by the Pandavas—or, in some versions, by all of Drona's pupils. However, the Mahabharata underscores Arjuna’s central role in this achievement, also reminding that he alone, among Drona’s disciples, had pledged in advance to deliver the fee.

=== Youth ===
Following their victory over Drupada, the Adi Parva turns to the episode of The Lacquer House Fire, a decisive moment in a series of escalating efforts by the eldest Kaurava, Duryodhana, to eliminate the Pandavas, whose talents and growing influence provoke deep resentment. In this instance, Yudhishthira discerns a veiled warning from their uncle Vidura, alerting him to a murderous plot. When the house is set ablaze, Bhima takes the lead in ensuring their survival by carrying his brothers and mother to safety through a hidden passage. Author Ruth Cecily Katz notes that Arjuna plays no notable role in this sequence, which stands in contrast to the heroism he displays elsewhere. Nevertheless, the event acts as a narrative pivot: it compels the Pandavas into exile, living in concealment under the guise of ascetic Brahmins, and paves the way for Arjuna's forthcoming feats in bride-winning that dominate the later portions of the first book.

The Pandava brothers and their mother, Kunti, reside in concealment in a village named Ekachakra disguised as Brahmins, and lead a quiet life in exile. Upon the advice of the sage Vyasa, they decide to go to the capital of Panchala. Arjuna’s first significant challenge as a fully initiated warrior occurs during this journey when he confronts Chitraratha, a hostile gandharva—a celestial being—who poses a threat to the Pandavas. In the course of this battle, Arjuna employs the Agneyastra, the divine missile associated with fire, to destroy his opponent’s chariot. This marks the first display of Arjuna’s martial prowess in his adult life. In recognition of his defeat, the subdued gandharva offers gifts to the five brothers, bestowing upon Arjuna the particular boon of visionary insight—a faculty in which Arjuna has already shown distinction.

=== Svayamvara and marriage to Draupadi ===
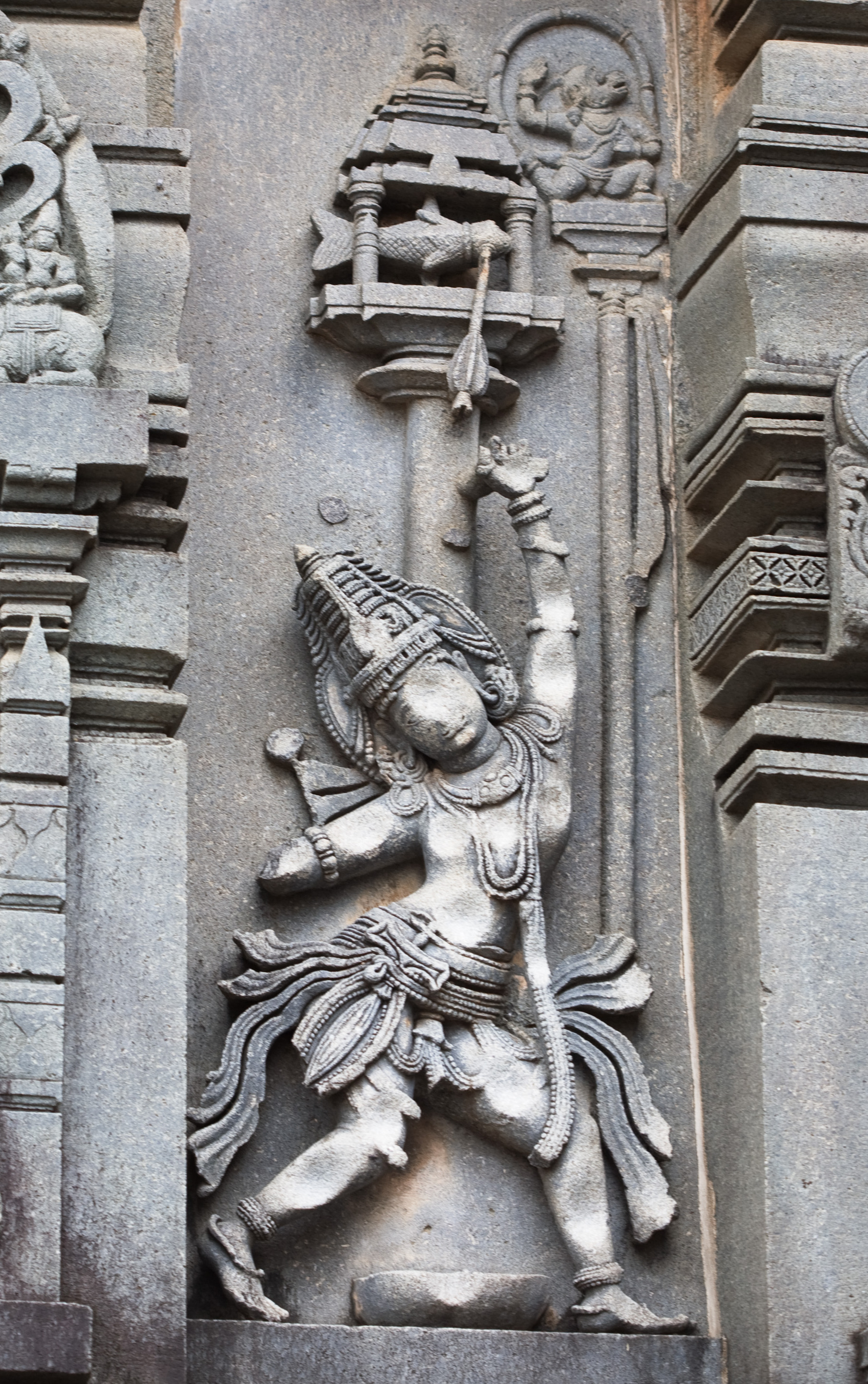
Arjuna piercing the eye of the fish as depicted in Chennakesava Temple.

Arjuna is central in the episode of svayamvara—or “bridegroom choice”—of Draupadi, the epic's heroine. Of all Arjuna’s marriages, his union with Draupadi is the most consequential for the heroic structure of the epic. It is not only the first among his four marriages but also foundational to the epic’s central conflict. The event also features first encounter between Arjuna and Krishna, who is the son of Vasudeva, Kunti's brother, making him the maternal cousin of the Pandavas.

King Drupada, Draupadi’s father, designs the challenge for the syavamvara specifically with Arjuna in mind, having developed a strong admiration for the warrior after being defeated by him in battle. Determined to obtain Arjuna as a son-in-law, Drupada tailors the test to suit his extraordinary skills. The svayamvara features a ceremonial archery contest in which barons must perform a feat of bow-bending, a trial commonly found in Indo-European heroic marriage traditions. Although the details of the contest vary across different recensions, all versions feature a target, often described as a suspended toy fish, which the suitor must strike. In more elaborate versions, which add a further degree of difficulty, the suitor is required to hit the eye of a rotating toy fish, while aiming only at its reflection in a vessel of water (or mirror) below. The Pandavas attend Draupadi’s svayamvara still in disguise. Arjuna, like the other Pandavas, instantly fell in love with Draupadi at first sight. Krishna, who is present at the event as a spectator and sympathetic to the Pandavas, recognizes Arjuna. Arjuna, still in his assumed guise, successfully completes the archery challenge by striking the target with five arrows—an accomplishment in which all other princes, including renowned warriors like Duryodhana and Karna, had failed.

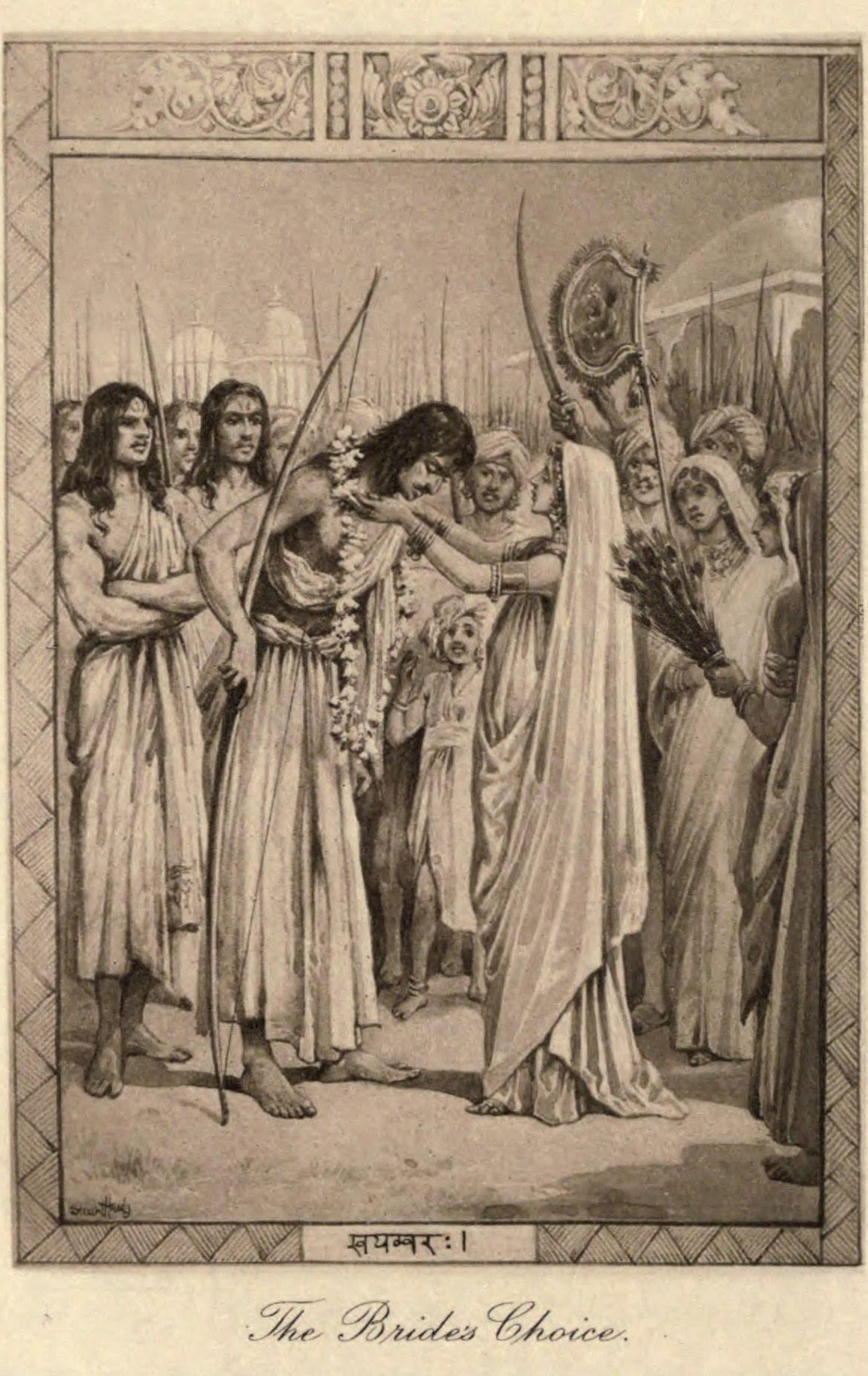
Illustration of Draupadi garlanding Arjuna, c. 1899

This outcome provokes anger among the assembled princes, particularly the Kshatriyas who perceive the svayamvara to have been won by an unassuming brahmana. Despite his disguise, Arjuna’s exceptional skill makes it evident that he is no ordinary Brahmin. When challenged and asked to reveal his identity, Arjuna responds ambiguously, declaring only that he is “the best among fighters”. Karna, upon realizing that the victor is a Brahmin—or so he believes—chooses not to engage him further, stating that it would be improper to fight a Brahmin. When Arjuna returns with Draupadi, Kunti—unaware of what exactly he has brought—unintentionally instructs her sons to share whatever has been obtained. Though spoken in ignorance, her words are interpreted as a binding directive. The situation is further complicated by Arjuna’s own refusal to marry Draupadi before his elder brother. Although Yudhishthira insists that Arjuna, having won her in the svayamvara, ought to be her husband, Arjuna declines on the grounds of seniority. This deference to fraternal hierarchy reinforces the Arjuna’ ethos of respect. Yudhishthira finally decides that she shall become the wife of all five brothers, to which they all agree. Later at the palace, Drupada joyfully welcomes the Pandavas, Kunti, and Draupadi, delighted that Arjuna has won her hand and promptly begins wedding preparations. However, upon learning she is to marry all five brothers, he vehemently objects. Vyasa intervenes, revealing that the Pandavas are partial incarnations of five Indras—Indra here being a divine office—and Draupadi is the incarnation of Shri, destined to be their common wife. After much reasoning, Drupada finally agrees, and Draupadi's wedding with each of the Pandavas is performed on successive days, with Arjuna's taking place on the third day.

Although Draupadi becomes the wife of all five Pandava brothers, Arjuna occupies a distinct position as her principal husband. This status is supported by textual references within the Mahābhārata that suggest Draupadi favours Arjuna and holds a particular affection for him. From their union, Arjuna fathers a son—named in various sources as either Shrutakriti or Shrutakarman—who is one of the five sons Draupadi bears, one by each of the Pandavas.

=== Pilgrimage ===
After their marriage to Draupadi and their survival revealed, the Pandavas are granted half the kingdom by the Kuru King Dhritarashtra. They then establish themselves at Khandavaprastha, where they oversee the construction of a great fortified city. This settlement is subsequently identified as Indraprastha, named in honour of Arjuna’s divine father, Indra. The brothers agree upon a code of conduct concerning Draupadi: none may intrude when she is alone with another. If this rule is breached, the offender must undergo a period of exile lasting one year—or twelve years, according to certain translations—during which he is required to remain celibate. Arjuna is the one who ultimately violates the agreement—unintentionally and for a justifiable cause. He enters his brother’s chamber to retrieve weapons, intending to defend the cattle of a Brahmin under threat. Although Yudhishthira offers to exempt him from the exile, Arjuna declines, choosing instead to honour the commitment. However, this vow of celibacy is broken as Arjuna marries three women during the course of his journey.

==== Encounter with Ulupi ====
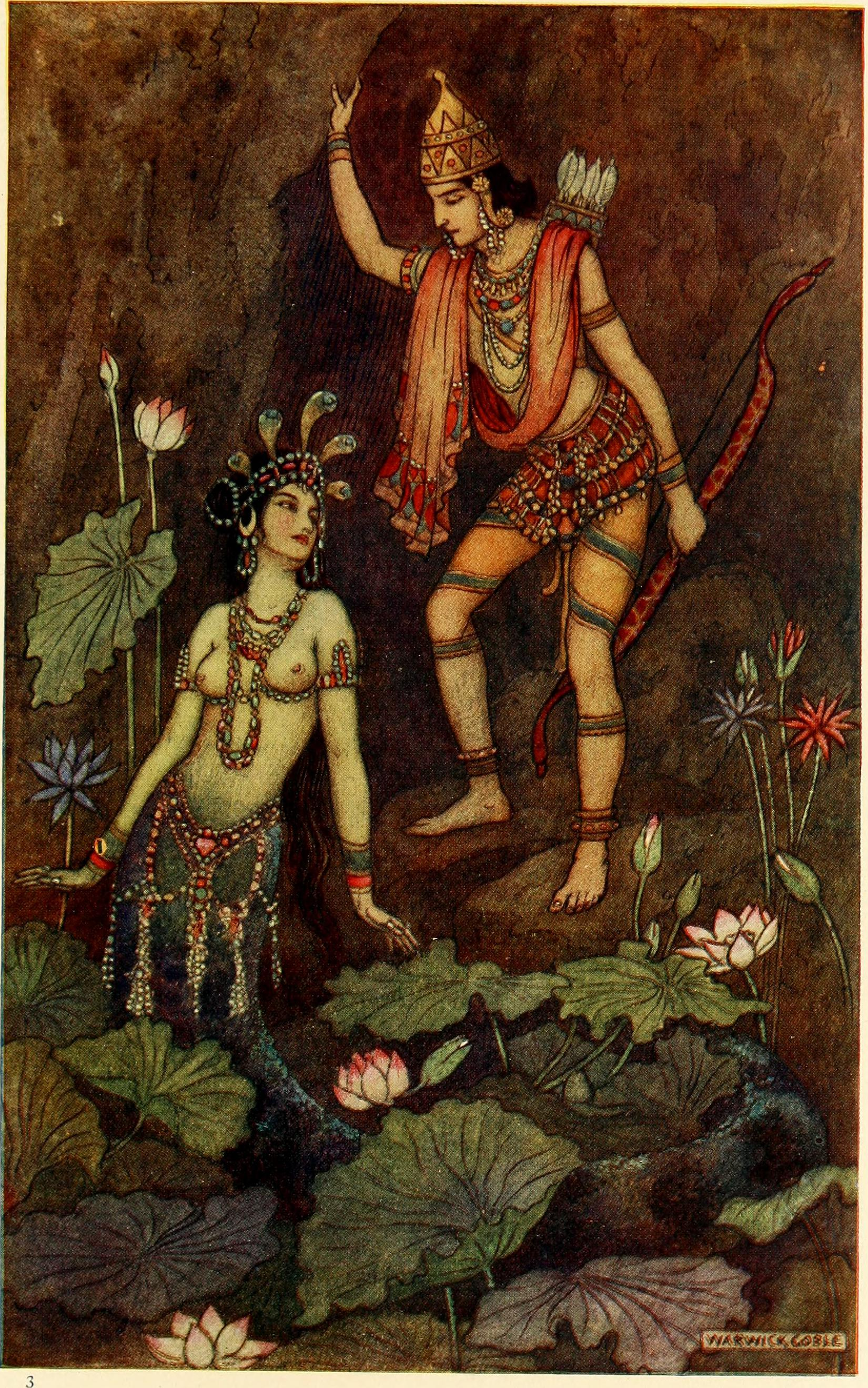
Arjuna encounters Ulupi, watercolour illustration, 1913

Upon leaving, Arjuna goes into pilgrimage, narrated in the Adi Parva. He eventually settles at a sacred site, Ganga-dvara, on the banks of river Ganga, where he makes offerings to his ancestors. While preparing to perform a fire ritual on the riverbank, he is suddenly seized during a bath and drawn beneath the waters by a Nāga (serpentine divine being) woman named Ulupi, who has developed a strong infatuation upon seeing him bathing in the river. In the enchanted underwater realm, Arjuna discovers a palace complete with a consecrated space where sacred fires are maintained, and it is here that he conducts a fire ceremony, or agnikarya. Ulupi, taking her human form, introduces herself as the daughter of the Nāga king Kauravya and expresses her longing for Arjuna, imploring him to have sex with her. Arjuna initially hesitates, determined to honour his vow of celibacy and explains his condition. However, Ulupi contends that his vow pertains solely to Draupadi, and declares that she would rather die than be refused. Invoking his role as protector of those in distress, Arjuna consents. Arjuna remains with Ulupi for a single night, fulfilling her desires, before continuing on his journey. Although no child is mentioned at the time of their encounter, it is later revealed that Ulupi had conceived and given birth to a son, Iravat, after Arjuna's departure. Further, Ulupi is later revealed to be a widow, when she sees first encounters Arjuna.

Ulupi is not called Arjuna's "wife" until the fourteenth book of the epic, Ashvamedhika Parva, due to which few consider it as a paramour affair. However, scholars state that their union is legitimised through what is traditionally identified as a gandharva marriage—a private, mutual agreement without formal rituals.

==== Marriage to Chitrangada and tour to the south ====
Arjuna continues his journey eastward, undertaking a pilgrimage to various sacred sites. In the course of his travels, he arrives at Manipura (also called Manalura), the capital of King Chitravahana. There, he becomes captivated by Chitrangada, the king’s only child. As a putrika—a daughter designated to carry forward the royal lineage through her own offspring—she is raised in the manner of a son. Arjuna formally approaches King Chitravahana to request her hand in marriage. The king consents, but only on the condition that any son born of the union must remain in Manipura to succeed the throne and preserve the matrilineal succession. This stipulation, whereby the offspring is effectively offered as the bride-price, renders the marriage an asura-type. Arjuna accepts the condition without protest. He resides in Manipura for a period described as three months—or, in the versions of the twelve-year exile narrative, three years—before continuing his journey southwards.

During his journey to the south, Arjuna encounters five sacred waters inhabited by cursed crocodiles that frighten away ascetics. Ignoring warnings, he enters one of the waters, and is attacked by a crocodile, which he overpowers and drags to the shore. The creature transforms into Varga, an apsara (celestial nymph), who reveals that she and four other apsaras—Saurabhi, Samichi, Budabuda and Lata—had been cursed to become crocodiles for attempting to seduce a young ascetic. Grateful for her release, Varga asks Arjuna to free her companions. He obliges, defeating the remaining crocodiles and liberating the Apsaras. He then revisits Manipura and is reunited with Chitrangada and their son, Babhruvahana. However, he neither attempts to settle there permanently nor seeks to take Chitrangada with him upon his departure.

==== Marriage to Subhadra ====
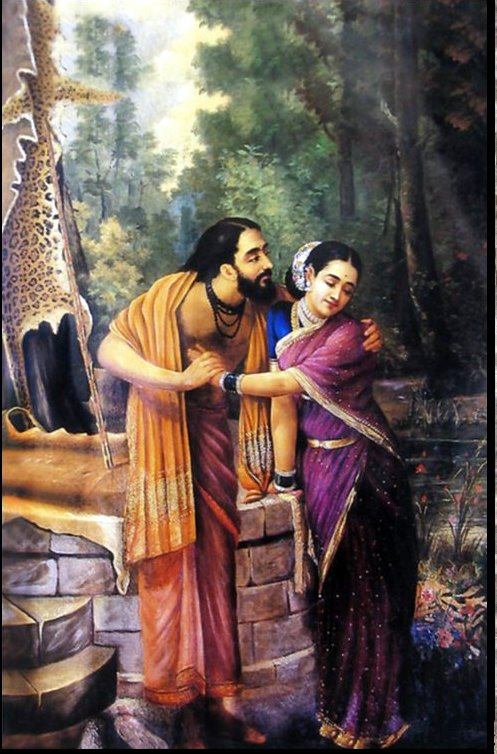
Painting by Raja Ravi Varma based on the Southern version of the story where Arjuna courts Subhadra before their elopement (see note).

Arjuna's pilgrimage goes westwards, eventually reaching the site of Prabhasa. Krishna, upon learning of Arjuna’s arrival, travels to Prabhasa to meet him. The two companions develop a strong bond. Krishna then invites Arjuna to his capital Dvaraka. During a festival at Mount Raivataka, Arjuna sees Subhadra, the princess of the Vrishnis (a clan of Yadava lineage), who is also Krishna’s sister, and is captivated by her beauty. Sensing his feelings, Krishna offers to intercede with their father but ultimately suggests abduction, arguing that a svayamvara would be uncertain in outcome. With Yudhishthira’s consent through messengers, Arjuna feigns a hunting trip on a chariot, seizes Subhadra on the Dwaraka–Raivataka road, and drives towards Indraprastha. (Note: In the southern recension, the narrative adopts a more romantic tone: at Krishna’s suggestion, Arjuna disguises himself as an ascetic and stays as a guest in royal palace after the festival, while Subhadra is tasked with caring for him. In this version, Arjuna discovers that Subhadra has long harboured feelings for him, having heard of his deeds. Their affection grows, and Arjuna eventually reveals his identity before the abduction—or elopement in this case.) The Vrishnis convene in response. Balarama advocates war, but Krishna defends Arjuna’s conduct, emphasising the honour shown to their family and the political advantages of the alliance. He argues that Arjuna, recognising both the Vrishnis’ lack of greed for bride-price and the unpredictability of a bridegroom-choice ceremony, chose the most respectful course available. Krishna’s reasoning prevails, and Arjuna is invited back to Dvaraka for a formal wedding ceremony.

The marriage with Subhadra is categorised as a rakshasa or capture-marriage—a form associated with heroic traditions across Indo-European literature. Arjuna spends the remaining period of his exile at Dvaraka, following which he returns to Indraprastha. While his brothers welcome him with his new bride, Draupadi reacts with jealousy. Arjuna repeatedly asked for forgiveness from Draupadi for his deed. A reconciliation is achieved when Arjuna sends Subhadra as a cowherd woman into Draupadi's chamber, eventually wins over Draupadi with her submission, and, in return, Draupadi considers her a sister. Subhadra continued to serve and support Draupadi throughout her life. Abhimanyu is born to Subhadra at Indraprastha. Although not central to the heroic arc in the way his marriage to Draupadi is, Arjuna’s marriage to Subhadra is of lasting importance, providing a key genealogical link in the epic’s structure, as the Kuru dynasty survives through Abhimanyu's descendants.

=== Burning of Khandava Forest ===
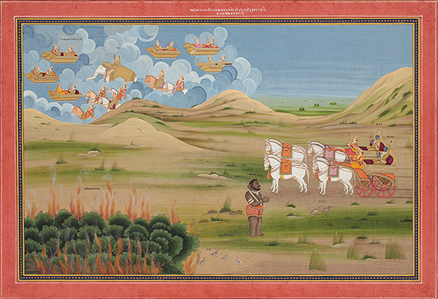
Burning of Khandava forest

One of the most enigmatic and controversial episodes in Arjuna's life is the burning of the Khandava Forest, recounted at the end of the Adi Parva. By this time, Arjuna and Krishna are close companions, often referred to collectively as "the two Krishnas". While resting along the Yamuna in the company of their wives, they are approached by a brahmin who is later revealed to be Agni, the god of fire, in disguise. Agni seeks their aid in consuming the Khandava Forest—a task he has repeatedly failed to complete due to the interference of Indra, who extinguishes the flames with rain, as the forest is inhabited by Takshaka, a Naga chieftain and Indra’s close ally. Bound by the kshatriya code to honour a brahmin's request, Arjuna and Krishna agree to help Agni regardless of the consequences. As a reward, Agni instructs the water-god Varuna to bestow upon Arjuna the celestial bow Gandiva, twin quivers of inexhaustible arrows, a divine chariot, and celestial steeds. Once committed, the two proceed with ruthless efficiency. As Agni sets the forest alight, Arjuna and Krishna slaughter all fleeing creatures, including demons, Asuras, Nagas, birds and other animals, ensuring none escape the inferno. Takshaka is notably absent during the massacre, but his wife is killed and his son, Ashvasena, narrowly escapes—vowing vengeance against Arjuna. When Indra arrives, joined by other Vedic deities, Arjuna repels them all, including his own divine father. The gods retreat—having been commanded by a mysterious celestial voice to stand down and observe, while also revealing that Arjuna and Krishna are incarnations of Nara and Narayana. After six days of relentless destruction, Indra promises Arjuna further divine weaponry in gratitude.

Alf Hiltebeitel describes the episode as "one of the strangest scenes of the epic". Katz notes its deep ethical dissonance with the overarching philosophy of the Mahabharata. The indiscriminate slaughter of innocents, and the blatant disregard for ahimsa (nonviolence) and the rules of war, sharply contrast with the epic’s didactic tone. Krishna and Arjuna, laughing as they destroy every creature in their path, evoke a frenzied, berserker-like ideal more aligned with archaic heroism than with the dharma-centred values often upheld elsewhere in the text. The episode is thought to preserve an older stratum of mythic storytelling—parallel to traditions found in the Iliad or the Epic of Gilgamesh—where absolute, even terrifying violence is valorised when enacted in service of a divine or cosmic imperative.

=== The game of dice ===
As heir to the lordship of Kurukshetra, Yudhishthira had attracted the unwelcome attention of his Kaurava cousin, Duryodhana, who sought the throne. The royal consecration involved an elaborate Vedic ceremony called rajasuya which extended over several years and included the playing of a ritualised game of dice. This particular game, described as "Indian literature's most notorious dice game" by Williams, was rigged by Duryodhana, causing Yudhishthira to gamble and lose everything, including his kingdom and his shared wife Draupadi. He and his brothers only obtained their freedom because Draupadi offered herself to the Kauravas in exchange. She was then humiliated by them so much that revenge for her treatment became a further motivation for the Pandavas in the rivalry with their cousins. During her humiliation, Karna called her an unchaste for marrying five men. This led Arjuna to take a vow of killing Karna. The brothers, including Arjuna, were forced into a 12-year exile, to be followed by a year living incognito if Yudhishthira was to regain his kingdom.

=== Exile of the Pandavas ===
While in this exile, Arjuna visited the Himalayas to get celestial weapons that he would be able to use against the Kauravas. Thereafter, he honed his battle skills with a visit to Swarga, the heaven of Indra, where he emerged victorious in a battle with the Daityas and also fought for Indra, his spiritual father, with the Gandiva.

After the battle at Khandava, Indra had promised Arjuna to give him all his weapons as a boon for matching him in battle with the requirement that Shiva is pleased with him. During the exile, following the advice of Krishna to go on meditation or tapasya to attain this divine weapon, Arjuna left his brothers for a penance on Indrakeeladri Hill (Vijayawada, Andhra Pradesh).

When Arjuna was in deep meditation, a wild boar ran towards him. He realized it and took out an arrow and shot it at the boar. But, another arrow had already pierced the boar. Arjuna was furious and he saw a hunter there. He confronted the hunter and they engaged in a fight. After hours of fighting, Arjuna was not able to defeat him and realized that the hunter was Shiva. Shiva was pleased and took his real form. He gave him Pashupatastra and told that the boar was Indra as he wanted to test Arjuna. After gaining the weapon, Indra took him to heaven and gave him many weapons.

During his exile, Arjuna was invited to the palace of Indra, his father. An apsara named Urvashi was impressed and attracted to Arjuna's look and talent so she expresses her love in front of him. But Arjuna did not have any intentions of having sex with Urvashi. Instead, he called her "mother". Because once Urvashi was the wife of King Pururavas the ancestor of Kuru dynasty. Urvashi felt insulted and cursed Arjuna that he will be a eunuch for the rest of his life. Later on Indra's request, Urvashi curtailed the curse to a period of one year.

=== At Matsya Kingdom ===
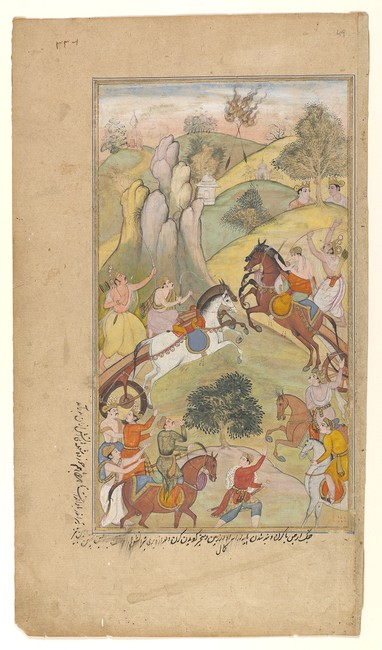
Arjuna Sets Kama's Arrow Alight, folio from the Razmnama (Book of War)

Arjuna spent the last year of exile as a eunuch named Brihannala at King Virata’s Matsya Kingdom. He taught singing and dancing to the princess Uttarā. After Kichaka humiliated and tried to molest Draupadi, Arjuna consoled her and Bhima killed Kichaka. When Duryodhana and his army attacked Matsya, Uttara, Uttarā's brother, with Brihannala as his charioteer went to the army. Later that day, the year of Agyatavasa was over. Arjuna took Uttara away from the army to the forest where he had kept his divine bow, Gandiva, and revealed his identity to Uttara. He then fought Kaurava army and single-handedly defeated them including warriors like Bheeshma, Drona, Ashwatthama, Karna, Duryodhana etc. When Arjuna's identity was revealed to the court, Uttarā was married to Arjuna's son Abhimanyu.

=== Kurukshetra War ===
==== Bhagavat Gita ====
The Bhagavad Gita is a book within the Mahabharata that depicts a dialogue between Arjuna and Krishna immediately prior to the commencement of the Kurukshetra War between the Pandavas and Kauravas. According to Richard H. Davis,

The conversation deals with the moral propriety of the war and much else as well. The Gita begins with Arjuna in confusion and despair, dropping his weapons; it ends with Arjuna picking up his bow, all doubts resolved and ready for battle.

==== In the war ====
Arjuna was a key warrior in Pandava's victory in the Kurukshetra. Arjuna's prowess as an archer was demonstrated by his success in slaying numerous warriors, including his own elder brother Karna and grandfather Bhishma.

- Fall of Bheeshma: On the 10th day of battle, Arjuna accompanied Shikhandi on the latter's chariot and they faced Bheeshma who did not fire arrows at Shikhandi but battles Arjuna. He was then felled in battle by Arjuna, pierced by innumerable arrows, piercing his entire body.
- Death of Bhagadatta: On the 12th day of the war, Arjuna killed the powerful king of Pragjyotisha Bhagadatta, along with his mighty elephant Supratika.
- Death of Jayadratha: Arjuna learns that Jayadratha blocked the other four Pandavas, at the entrance of Chakravyuha, due to which Abhimanyu entered alone and was killed unfairly by multiple Kaurava warriors on the 13th day of the war. Arjuna vowed to kill him the very next day before sunset, failing which he would kill himself by jumping into a fire. Arjuna pierced into the Kaurava army on the 14th day, killing seven akshouhinis of their army, and finally beheaded Jayadratha on the 14th day of the war.
- Death of Sudakshina: He killed Sudakshina the king of Kambojas on the 14th day using Indrastra killing him and a large part of his army. He also killed Shrutayu, Ashrutayu, Niyutayu, Dirghayu, Vinda, and Anuvinda during his quest to kill Jayadratha.
- Death of Susharma: Arjuna on the 18th day killed King Susharma of Trigarta Kingdom, the main Kaurava ally.
- Death of Karna: The much anticipated battle between Arjuna and Karna took place on the 17th day of war. The battle continued fiercely and Arjuna killed Karna by using Anjalikastra.

=== Later life and death ===
After the Kurukshetra War, Yudhishthira appointed Arjuna as the Prime Minister of Hastinapur. Yudhishthira performed Ashvamedha. Arjuna followed the horse to the land of Manipura and encountered Babhruvahana, one of his sons. None of them knew one another. Babhruvahana asked Arjuna to fight and injured his father during the battle. Chitrāngadā came to the battlefield and revealed that Arjuna was her husband and Babhruvahana's father. Ulupi, the second wife of Arjuna, revived Arjuna using a celestial gem called Nagamani.

After Krishna left his mortal body, Arjuna took the remaining citizens of Dwaraka to Indraprastha. On the way, they were attacked by a group of bandits. Arjuna desisted from fighting seeing the law of time.

Upon the onset of the Kali Yuga, and acting on the advice of Vyasa, Arjuna and other Pandavas retired, leaving the throne to Parikshit (Arjuna's grandson and Abhimanyu's son). Giving up all their belongings and ties, the Pandavas and Draupadi, accompanied by a dog, made their final journey of pilgrimage to the Himalayas. The listener of the Mahabharata is Janamejaya, Parikshit's son and Arjuna's great-grandson.

== Outside Indian subcontinent ==
=== Indonesia ===
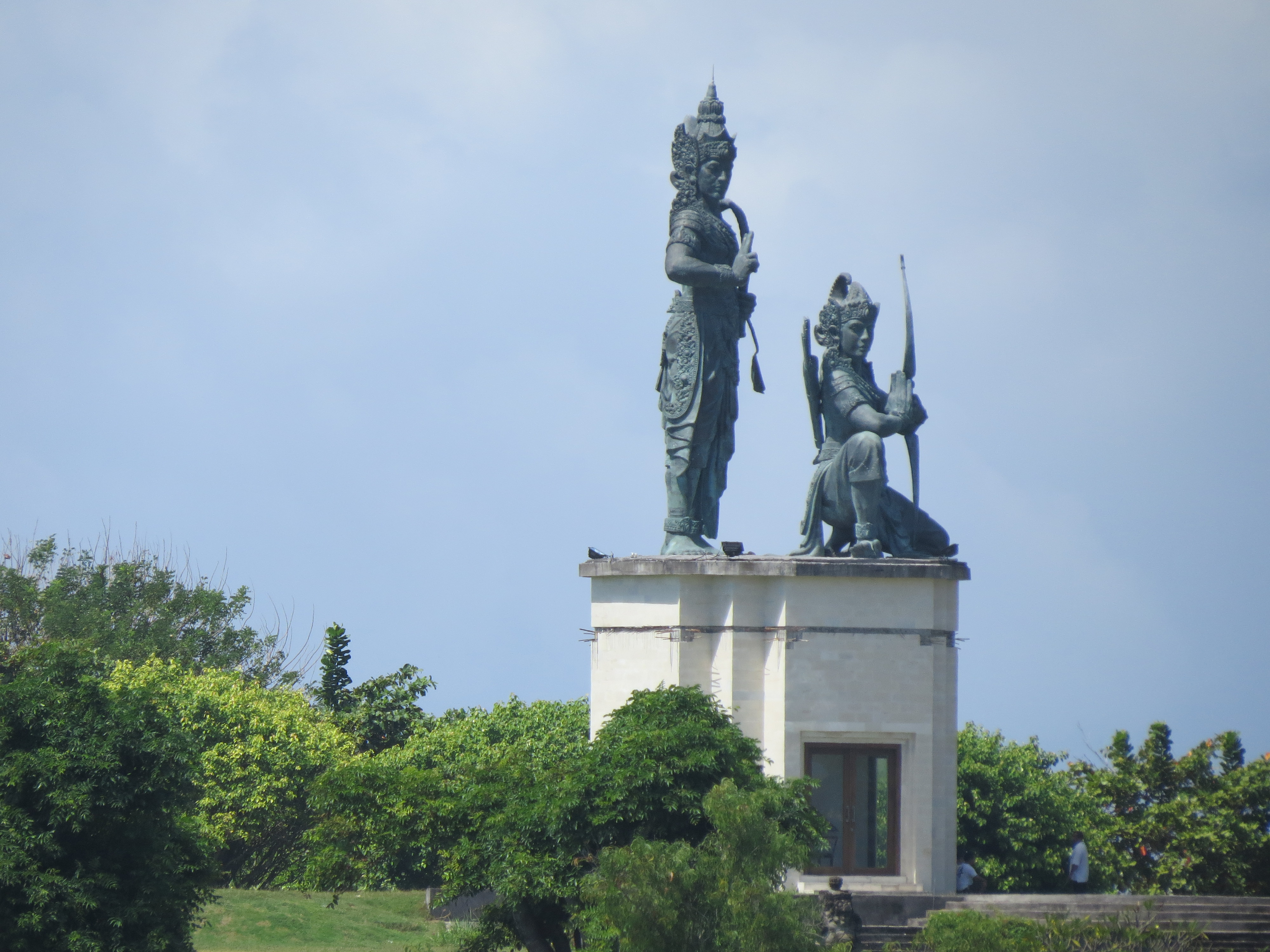
Krishna and Arjuna statue in Bali, Indonesia

In the Indonesian archipelago, the figure of Arjuna is also known and has been famous for a long time. Arjuna especially became popular in the areas of Java, Bali, Madura and Lombok. In Java and later in Bali, Arjuna became the main character in several kakawin, such as Kakawin Arjunawiwāha, Kakawin Pārthayajña, and Kakawin Pārthāyana (also known as Kakawin Subhadrawiwāha. In addition, Arjuna is also found in several temple reliefs on the island of Java, for example the Surawana temple.

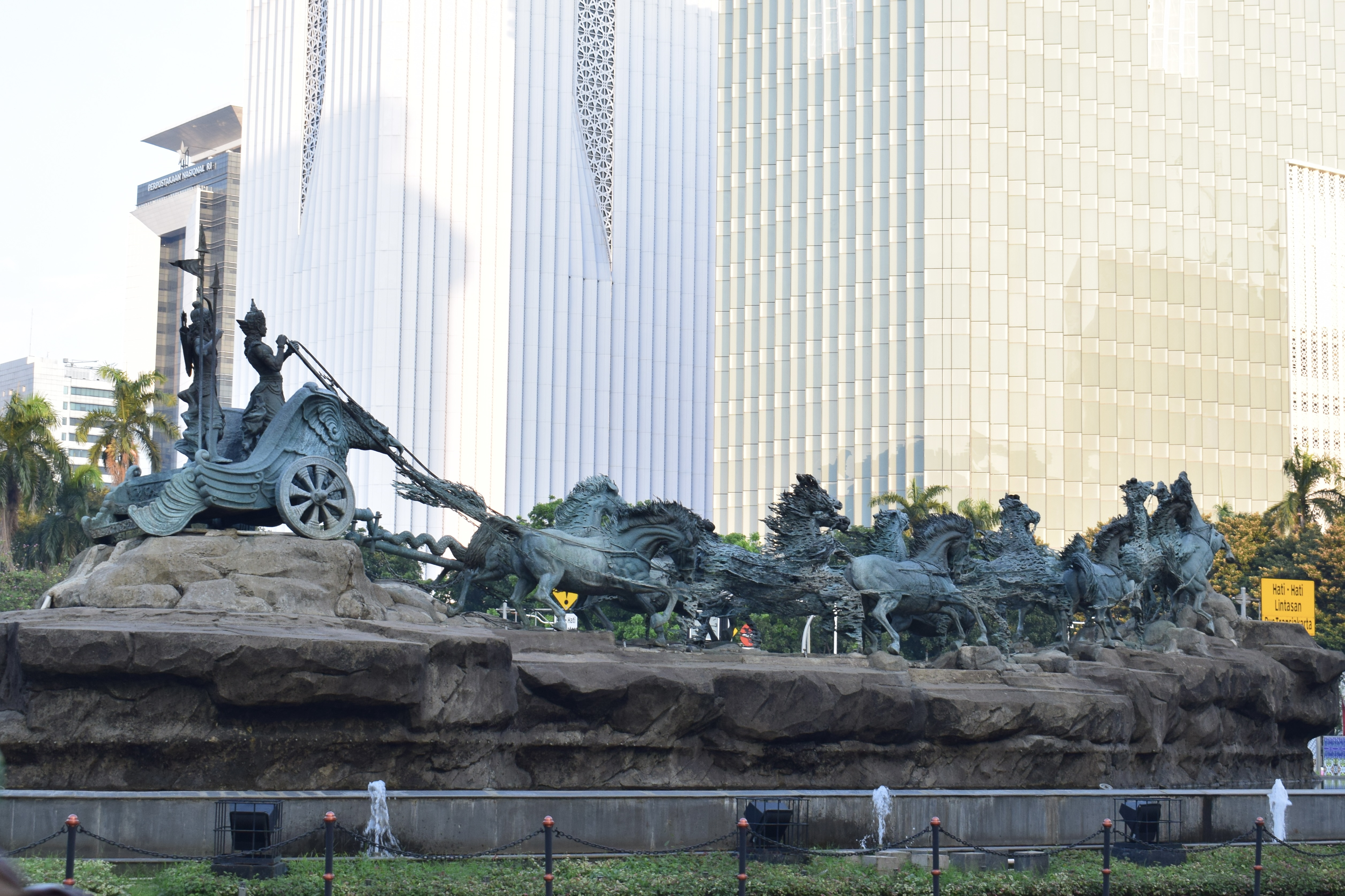
Arjuna Wijaya Chariot Statue in Jakarta

==== Wayang story ====
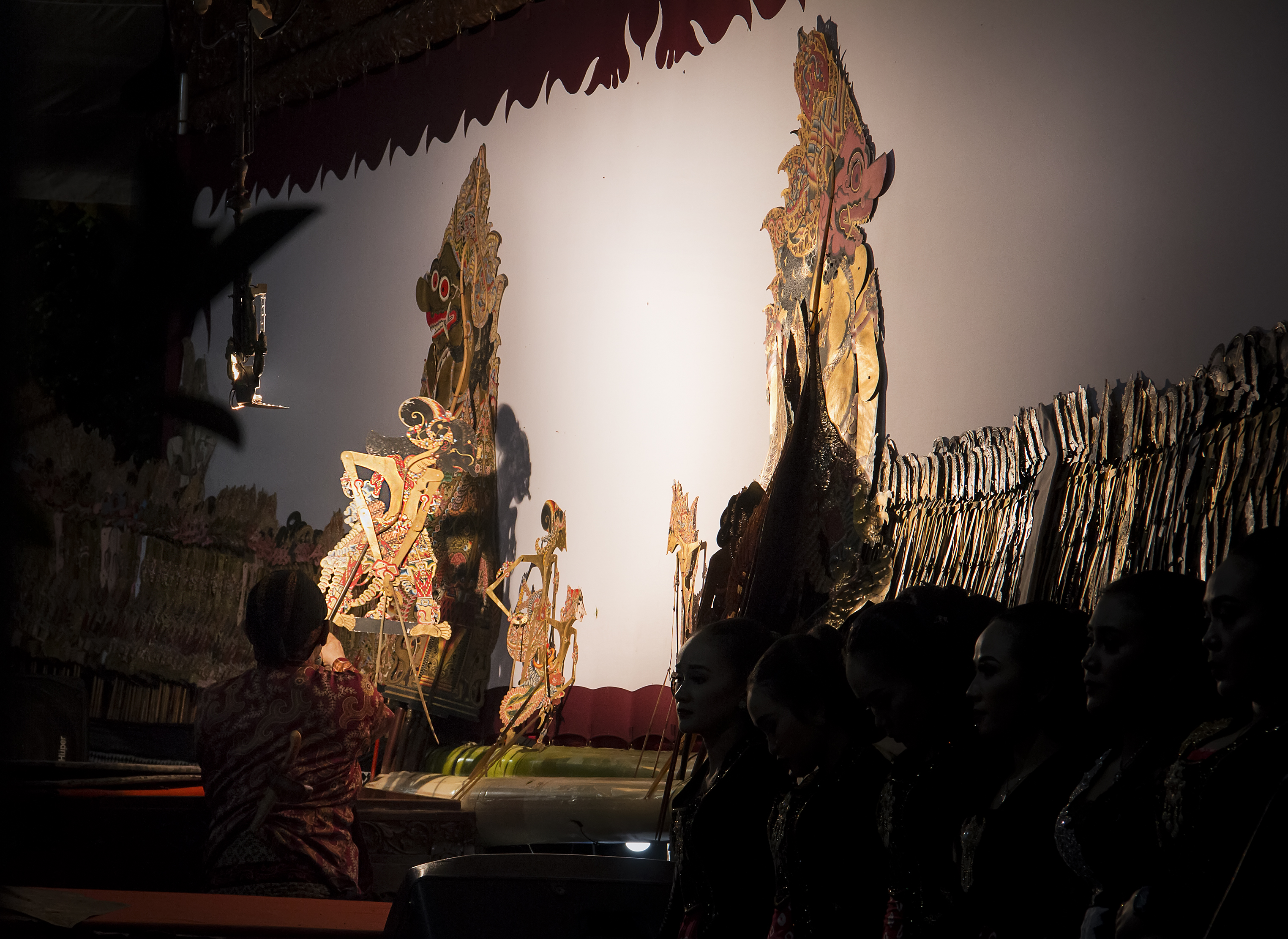
Arjuna wayang (puppetry) in Indonesian culture, especially Java

Arjuna is a well-known figure in the world of wayang (Indonesian puppetry) in Javanese culture. Some of the characteristics of the wayang version of Arjuna may be different from that of Arjuna in the Indian version of the Mahābhārata book in Sanskrit. In the world of puppetry, Arjuna is described as a knight who likes to travel, meditate, and learn. Apart from being a student of Resi Drona at Padepokan Sukalima, he is also a student of Resi Padmanaba from the Untarayana Hermitage. Arjuna was a Brahman in Goa Mintaraga, with the title Bagawan Ciptaning. He was made the superior knight of the gods to destroy Prabu Niwatakawaca, the giant king of the Manimantaka country. For his services, Arjuna was crowned king in Dewa Indra's heaven, with the title King Karitin and get the gift of magical heirlooms from the gods, including: Gendewa (from Bhatara Indra), Ardadadali Arrow (from Bhatara Kuwera), Cundamanik Arrow (from Bhatara Narada). After the Bharatayuddha war, Arjuna became king in Banakeling State, the former Jayadrata kingdom.

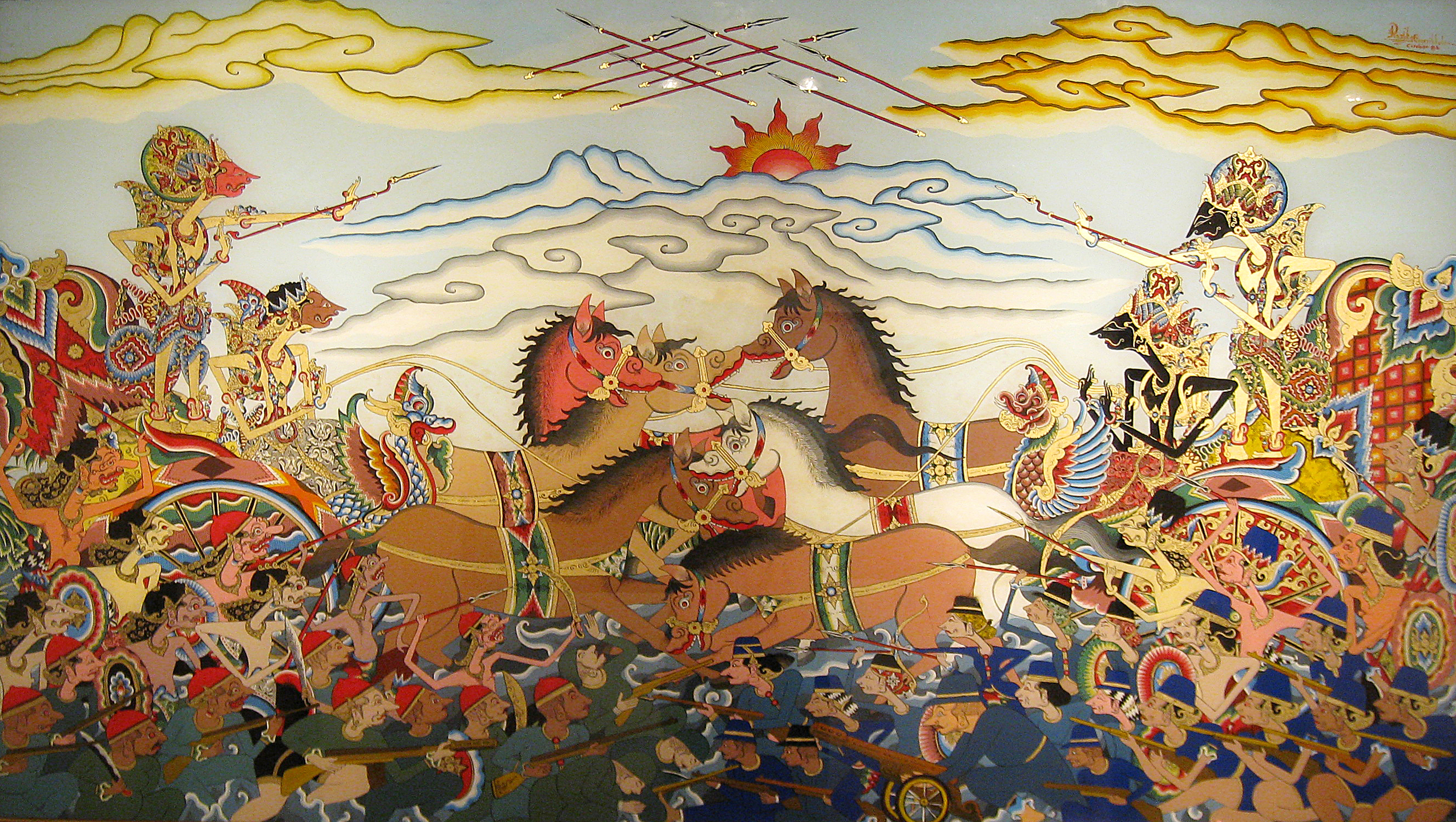
Painting of Bharatayudha war

Arjuna is depict as a smart and clever nature, is quiet, conscientious, polite, brave and protect the weak. He leads the Madukara Duchy, within the territory of the state of Amarta. For older generations of Java, he has been regerded as an embodiment of an ideal man. Very different from Yudhisthira, he characterized as someone who enjoyed worldly life. His romantic adventures is a recurring theme in the Javanese storytelling, though he is distinguished from figures like Don Juan who always pursue women. According to tradition, Arjuna was so refined and handsome that princesses, as well as the ladies-in-waiting, would immediately offer themselves, rather than the other way around. He is a contrast from Wrekudara. Arjuna's displayed a graceful body and a gentleness that was appreciated by the Javanese audiences across generations.

Arjuna also has other powerful heirlooms, among others: The Kiai Kalanadah Keris was given to Gatotkaca when he married Dewi Gowa (Arjuna's son), Sangkali Arrow (from Resi Drona), Candranila Arrow, Sirsha Arrow, Sarotama Kiai Arrow, Pasupati Arrow (from Batara Guru), Panah Naracabala, Arrow Ardhadhedhali, Keris Kiai Baruna, Keris Pulanggeni (given to Abhimanyu), Terompet Dewanata, Cupu filled with Jayengkaton oil (given by Bagawan Wilawuk from Pringcendani hermitage) and Ciptawilaha Horse with Kiai Pamuk's whip. Arjuna also has clothes that symbolize greatness, namely Kampuh or Limarsawo Cloth, Limarkatanggi Belt, Minangkara Gelung, Candrakanta Necklace and Mustika Ampal Ring (formerly belonging to King Ekalaya, the king of the Paranggelung state).

== In popular culture ==
- Arjun: The Warrior Prince
- The American astronomer Tom Gehrels named a class of asteroids with low inclination, low eccentricity and earth-like orbital period as Arjuna asteroids.
- The Arjuna Award is presented every year in India to one talented sportsperson in every national sport.
- Arjun is a third generation main battle tank developed for the Indian Army.
- Mayilpeeli Thookkam is a ritual art of dance performed in the temples of Kerala. It is also known as Arjuna Nrithyam ('Arjuna's dance') as a tribute to his dancing abilities. .
- Arjuna is also an Archer class Servant in the mobile game Fate/Grand Order. He is a minor antagonist in the "E Pluribus Unum" story chapter, where he wishes to fight Karna again. Arjuna also appears as a rogue Archer servant in the game Fate/Samurai Remnant as one of servants recruitable by the protagonist Iori.
- The protagonist in Steven Pressfield's 1995 book The Legend of Bagger Vance and its 2000 film adaptation, Rannulph Junuh, is based in part on Arjuna (R. Junuh).

== See also ==
- Mahabharata
- Kurukshetra War
- Pandavas

== Bibliography ==
- Katz, Ruth Cecily (1 January 1990). Arjuna in the Mahabharata: Where Krishna Is, There Is Victory. Motilal Banarsidass. ISBN 978-81-208-0744-0.
- McGrath, Kevin (2016). Arjuna Pandava: The Double Hero in Epic Mahabharata. Orient Blackswan. ISBN 978-8-12506-309-4.
- Brodbeck, Simon Pearse (2 March 2017). The Mahabharata Patriline: Gender, Culture, and the Royal Hereditary. Routledge. ISBN 978-1-351-88630-7.
- Brodbeck, Simon; Black, Brian (2007). Gender and Narrative in the Mahabharata. Routledge. ISBN 978-1-134-11994-3.
- Hiltebeitel, Alf (28 July 2011). Dharma: Its Early History in Law, Religion, and Narrative. Oxford University Press. ISBN 978-0-19-987524-5.
- Buitenen, Johannes Adrianus Bernardus (1973). The Mahābhārata. University of Chicago Press. ISBN 978-0-226-84663-7.
- Brockington, J. L. (1998). The Sanskrit Epics. Brill Academic. p. 26. ISBN 978-9-00410-260-6.
- Minor, Robert N. (1982). Bhagavad Gita: An Exegetical Commentary. South Asia Books. pp. l–l1. ISBN 978-0-8364-0862-1. Archived from the original on 16 April 2023.
- Doniger, Wendy (March 2014). On Hinduism. Oxford University Press. ISBN 978-0-19-936007-9.
- McGrath, Kevin (2004). The Sanskrit Hero: Karna in Epic Mahabharata. Brill Academic. pp. 19–26. ISBN 978-9-00413-729-5. Archived from the original on 16 April 2023.
- Chakrabarti, Arindam; Bandyopadhyay, Sibaji (2017). Mahabharata Now: Narration, Aesthetics, Ethics. Routledge. ISBN 978-1-317-34213-7.
- Dikshitar, V R Ramachandra (1952). The Purana Index (from T To M) Vol-II.
- Sharma, Arvind (2007). Essays on the Mahābhārata. Motilal Banarsidass Publishers. ISBN 978-81-208-2738-7.
