= Madri =

Queen and mother of the Pandavas in the epic Mahabharata

- Mahabharata character
- A print of Madri by Raja Ravi Varma (1848 – 1906)

Information
- Aliases: Madravati, Bahliki, Madrarajasuta
- Position: Queen of Kuru Kingdom
- Family: Madraraja (father); Shalya (brother)
- Spouse: Pandu
- Children: Nakula and Sahadeva (by Ashvins)
- Relatives: Kunti (co-wife)
- Origin: Madra Kingdom
- Clan: Bahlika

Madri (Sanskrit: माद्री, IAST: Mādrī), also known as Madravati (Sanskrit: माद्रवती, IAST: Mādravatī), is a legendary character in the Mahabharata, an ancient Sanskrit epic poem. She is the princess from the Madra Kingdom and becomes the second wife of Pandu, the king of the Kuru Kingdom. She is the mother of the twins Nakula and Sahadeva, the youngest of the five Pandava brothers.

Madri is the daughter of Madraraja—the king of Madra—and sister of Shalya. Her marriage to Pandu is arranged by Bhishma, the grandsire of the Kuru dynasty, in exchange for a heavy bride price. After Pandu is cursed that he would die if he engaged in sexual relations, Madri accompanies Pandu in his self-imposed exile, along with Pandu's first wife, Kunti. Using Kunti's divine boon, Madri invokes the twin gods Ashvins to conceive her twin sons. Later, the cursed Pandu dies when he is overcome by desire and initiates intimacy with Madri. Overcome with remorse and grief, Madri entrusts her sons to Kunti's care and joins him in death.

Madri is traditionally viewed as a pativrata (devoted wife), whose beauty and charm are emphasised in the epic and its later adaptations. Madri's death by self-immolation is often cited as the earliest textual attestation of the sati practice; however, due to conflicting verses in the Mahabharata, it has been the subject of varied interpretations, with some scholars disputing the sati account.

== Literary background ==
Madri appears in the Mahabharata, one of the Sanskrit epics originating from the Indian subcontinent, which primarily narrates about conflict between two groups of cousins—the Pandavas and the Kauravas. Composed in Classical Sanskrit, the text is a composite work shaped over centuries of revisions, editing, and interpolations. The oldest portions of the extant text likely date to around 400 BCE. Manuscripts of the Mahabharata exist in numerous versions, with substantial variations in the details of key characters and events. An exception is the section containing the Bhagavad Gita, which remains notably consistent across different manuscripts. Significant differences exist between the Northern and Southern recensions, with the Southern versions generally being more elaborate and extended. Scholars have undertaken the creation of a critical edition, primarily drawing from the "Bombay", "Poona", "Calcutta", and "South Indian" editions of the text. The most widely accepted version is that compiled by a team led by Vishnu Sukthankar at the Bhandarkar Oriental Research Institute (BORI), with copies preserved at Kyoto University, Cambridge University, and various institutions across India.

Madri's role in the Mahabharata is brief, but significant in advancing the narrative. Her entire life—from her introduction to her death—is recounted in the Adi Parva, the first of eighteen parvas or 'Books' of the Mahabharata. Scholar Alf Hiltebeitel points out that Madri is introduced in verses 105.1–6 of the Adi Parva, as part of a triad of new brides for Kuru dynasty alongside Kunti and Gandhari. In the section spanning from 103.9 to 119.12, Kunti is allotted 195 verses, Gandhari 36 and Madri 85, not counting descriptions of their sons at birth. This allocation not only emphasizes Kunti's rising narrative prominence but also marks the first appearance of conjugal rivalry among co-wives in the epic's generational structure—where Madri soon emerges as Kunti's main rival. Despite her early death in the first book, Madri continues to be mentioned in subsequent parvas. (Note: The most prominent mention occurs in the third book, Vana Parva, when all the Pandavas except Yudhishthira fall dead, and he is granted an opportunity to revive only one. Yudhishthira chooses Nakula, citing that it would be fair as this would ensure that at least one son of each mother—Kunti and Madri—would survive. Pleased with his reasoning, all four are revived.)

== Name and epithets ==
Mādrī derives etymologically from Madra, designating the northwestern Indian subcontinental kingdom from which she originates. Thus, Mādrī connotes 'pertaining to Madra' or, within this specific context, 'woman of Madra'. While the epithet is most commonly associated with Pandu's second wife, it has also been applied to other princesses of Madra.

Additionally, a cognate epithet, Mādravatī, frequently appears in reference to Madri, though it also denotes the wife of Parikshit in epic literature. Another epithet, Madrarājasutā, meaning 'daughter of the king of Madra', is also used to refer to her. Madri belonged to the Bahlika clan, originating from Balkh in Bactria; as such, she is also called Bāhlikī in few instances in the epic Mahabharata. When Madri is introduced in the epic, she is described as rūpeṇāsadṛśī, literally 'unparalleled in beauty'.

== Biography ==
Madri is mentioned as an incarnation of the goddess Dhriti ('Endurance') in the Adi Parva. Madri is mentioned as exceedingly attractive, and sometimes even described being dark complexioned.

=== Marriage ===
Madri is the daughter of the king of the Madra Kingdom, belonging to the Bahlika clan, and the sister of Shalya. Bhishma, a prominent statesman of the Kuru kingdom and the grandsire of the royal family, travels to Madra to secure Madri's hand in marriage for Pandu, the king of the Kuru Kingdom. The Madra king consents to the marriage, but only in exchange for a bride price as per Madra custom. Bhishma offers him gold, elephants and horses as payment, and subsequently brings Madri to Hastinapura, the capital of Kuru, where she is married to Pandu.

Pandu has a first wife, Kunti, with whom Madri shares an amicable relationship, despite an underlying rivalry between the two.

=== Exile ===
Shortly after his marriage, Pandu embarks on military conquests. Following these successful campaigns, he goes to tapovana (forest of austerities) south of Himalayas, accompanied by both his wives, Kunti and Madri. During the expedition in a forest, he observes a deer and a doe in the act of coitus and desiring to hunt them, shoots arrows at them. Upon approaching, he realizes that the deer is, in fact, the sage Kindama, who had assumed the cervine form to enjoy privacy with his wife, who is the doe. As he lies dying, the sage pronounces a curse upon Pandu, decreeing that he dies instantly should he ever attempt to have sexual intercourse. Pandu, Kunti and Madri lament the incident. Disturbed by the gravity of his actions and seeking repentance, Pandu chooses to relinquish his royal duties and wants to live an ascetic life in the forest. However, both Kunti and Madri oppose this, insisting instead on accompanying him as devoted wives and persuading him to adopt the life of an ashrama-dweller—which allows participation of wives—rather than that of a strict ascetic. Pandu agrees and with Kunti and Madri, he departs to the forests. After travelling to various pilgrim sites, they settle in the Shatashringa forests under the care of sages who live there.

=== Birth of Nakula and Sahadeva ===
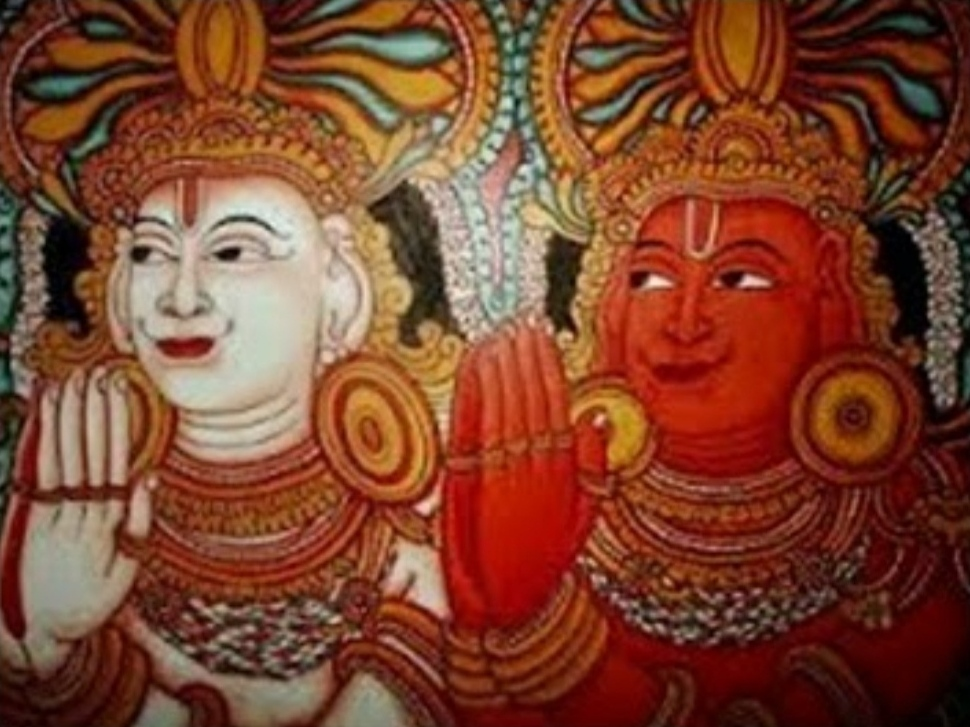
Due to Pandu's curse, each of the five Pandavas is fathered through the practice of niyoga which allows a reputed man to father children on behalf of the husband, with the children being acknowledged as the husband's alone. Madri's twins are fathered by the twin gods, the Ashvins (pictured).

During his exile, Pandu, hindered in fulfilling his religious duties due to his lack of an heir, discusses the matter with Kunti, urging her to "raise offspring in this time of distress." He cites twelve types of sons as recognised by religious doctrines, including those born through the practice of niyoga. Kunti discloses her boon from Durvasa to bear a child from any deity, though she initially resists using it. Only after Pandu's fervent pleas does Kunti invoke her boon, resulting in the birth of her three sons—Yudhishthira, Bhima, and Arjuna. When Pandu requests Kunti to bear more children, Kunti firmly refuses, stating that doing so would diminish her dignity and reduce her to the status of a prostitute.

Madri, in a private moment with Pandu, expresses her sorrow at being childless, despite holding equal status with Kunti. She acknowledges with a sense of consolation that fate had granted her husband an heir through Kunti, but she adds that it would benefit Pandu's lineage, if she could also bear children. Madri concludes that being Kunti's 'rival', she can't approach her directly and requests Pandu to convince her to share the mantra for help in bearing a child. The unabridged recensions of the Mahabharata present a more detailed conversation that further reveals Madri's sense of envy. While expressing her fear of remaining barren, Madri confides in Pandu that, despite considering herself superior to Kunti by birth, she feels overshadowed by Kunti in both Pandu's affections and the dynamics of the household.

Upon Pandu's request, Kunti generously shares the mantra with Madri, who invokes the youthful twin-gods of medicine, collectively known as the Ashvins, to beget Nakula and Sahadeva at once. The Kaunteyas (lit. 'sons of Kunti') and Madreyas (lit. 'sons of Madri') are raised together in the hermitage, and they are collectively referred to as the Pandavas.

After some time, Madri, through Pandu, asks Kunti for the assistance to bear more children. However, Kunti firmly refuses the request, expressing her frustration by noting that Madri had "deceived" her by using a single mantra to gain two sons. She voices her regret, fearing that Madri might end up with more children than herself, and admitted she would have also summoned the Ashvins to obtain twins had she known. Concluding her response, Kunti insists that Pandu not come to her again with requests to share Madri the mantra.

=== Death ===
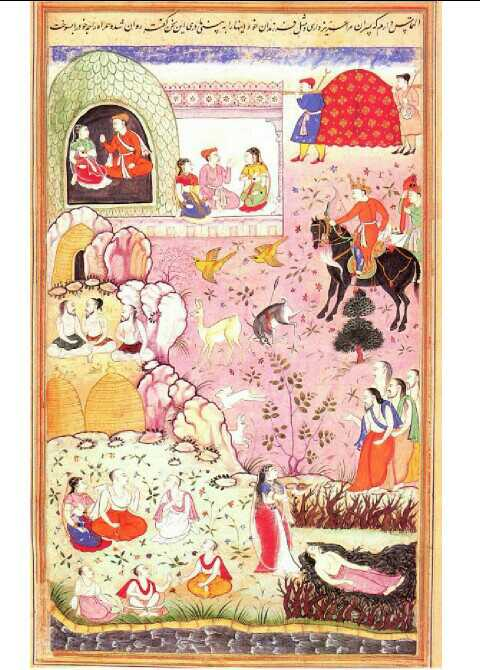
A folio from the Razmnama (16th century Persian translation of the Mahabharata) depicting scenes of Pandu's life. At the bottom right, Madri is depicted jumping into his funeral pyre.

Years later, during one spring—the season linked with erotism in Hindu tradition—in the forest of Shatashringa, Pandu is deeply influenced by the intensity of the atmosphere. While Pandu walks alone in this setting, Madri—dressed in sheer fabric—follows him. Upon seeing her, Pandu succumbs to desire. In the Southern Edition, this incident occurs on the day of Arjuna's birthday celebration, when Kunti was busy serving guests. Despite Madri's repeated protests, Pandu initiates intimacy with her, forgetting the curse, which forbids him from intimate relations on penalty of death. The curse takes immediate effect; Pandu falls dead in Madri's arms. Upon Pandu's death, Madri cries out in sorrow, summoning Kunti but asking her to come alone, leaving the children behind. Kunti, seeing Pandu and Madri together, blames Madri for the incident, accusing her of having seduced Pandu. Madri, however, defends herself, claiming that she was the one who was seduced. Madri also explains that despite her efforts to resist Pandu's advances, he had been resolute in consummating their union, compelled by the force of fate. Kunti sorrowfully notes that Madri is "fortunate" to see Pandu's face radiant in intimacy—a moment Kunti herself never experiences. Following this, Kunti, as the senior wife, claims the religious duty to accompany Pandu in death, believing it her responsibility to follow him to the afterlife. She asks Madri to relinquish his body and take on the task of raising their children.

Madri, however, resists Kunti's request, stating that she feels bound to Pandu by an unfulfilled union, as he approached her in desire at the time of his death. Madri expresses her wish to follow Pandu into the afterlife to fulfill his desire, also fearing she might not be able to raise Kunti's children with equal dedication and affection. She appeals to Kunti to care for her own children, Nakula and Sahadeva, in her absence, trusting in Kunti's ability to provide for them impartially. During Pandu's funeral, Madri jumps into Pandu's burning pyre, thus performing the act of sati. The Critical Edition of the Mahabharata presents a brief exchange between Kunti and Madri, after which it simply states that "the daughter of the king of the Madras, Pandu's revered wife, follows the noble one onto his funeral pyre." In contrast, the Southern Recension offers additional details, describing how the sages and the "foremost Brahmanas" attempt to dissuade both Kunti and Madri from their intent to perform sati. The Southern Edition also adds a dialogue between Madri and Yudhishthira, in which she implores Yudhishthira to take care of his younger brothers like a father.

However, the account of sati is contradicted by the very next stanza, which states that seventeen days after Pandu's death, her dead body and that of her husband are handed over by sages to the Kaurava elders in Hastinapura for the funeral rites. Dhritarashtra, the king of Kuru and Pandu's elder brother, arranges a grand royal funeral for both Pandu and Madri in the capital. As described in detail, corpses of Madri and Pandu are dressed modestly in fine cotton clothes and smeared with sandalwood paste and other sweet scents before being cremated on same funeral pyre.

The Svargarohana Parva (the last book of the Mahabharata) mentions that in the afterlife, Madri's soul resides in the heavenly realm of the god Indra.

== Assessment ==
Madri is traditionally portrayed as a pativrata, or "devoted wife", who follows her husband's death out of love. Assessments emphasize Madri's unparalleled beauty, a quality that is frequently portrayed as surpassing that of her co-wife Kunti. According to Mahabharata scholar Pradeep Bhattacharya, Madri's charms and physical appeal allowed her to win Pandu's favoritism, as seen when he grants her the freedom to choose her divine partner without the restrictions that were earlier imposed on Kunti. Other critics observe that Madri's beauty, while notable, reduces her character in the epic to that of merely a "beloved wife", overshadowing her individuality and eventually being blamed for Pandu's death. Simon Brodbeck suggests that Madri's sexual nature, linked to her choice of the twin Ashvins—"two for of price of one"—and her role in Pandu's death, aligns with stereotypes of Madra women as sexually rampant, a reputation highlighted by the warrior Karna's fierce denouncement of the Bahlika clan during the Kurukshetra War, targeting the relatives of his foe—Shalya. Madri's strategic thinking and cleverness are also highlighted—rather than directly asking Kunti, she convinces Pandu by making it about his legacy and also manages to gain two children in a single opportunity, the latter of which Kunti views as "wicked" and "deceitful".

Although Kunti and Madri mostly shared an amicable relationship, the rivalry and envy between them illustrate a common dynamic in polygamous settings. (Note: While discussing her desire for children with Pandu, Madri affirms that Kunti is her rival and does not shy away from expressing her sensitivity in seeking Kunti's favour. Bhattacharya points out that Kunti similarly expresses resentment over Madri's ability to outmaneuver her, particularly at the moment of Pandu's death when she finds Madri in his arms. This is further evident when Kunti, feeling betrayed by Madri's use of her generosity to outdo her in the number of children, refuses to share her mantra again.) According to Alf Hiltebeitel, while Kunti and Madri initially appear as dharmapatni (lawful wives) united in loyalty toward Pandu, their latent rivalry is activated after Madri's speech to Pandu and continues to intensify thereafter. According to Baisakhi Ghosh, a Sanskrit scholar and author, their rivalry stemmed from Kunti's belief that Madri was favored by the king due to her beauty, while Madri felt that Kunti, as the chief queen, held a status she herself deserved, fueled by her conviction that she equalled or exceeded Kunti. Bhattacharya positions Madri within a broader pattern of dependent female characters in the Mahabharata—like Ambika, Ambalika, and Gandhari—who conform to social or marital expectations, contrasting them with powerful kanyas like Kunti, Draupadi, and Satyavati, who shape the epic's narrative. Mythologist Devdutt Pattanaik further highlights the distinction of prominence between the two co-wives, noting that while Kunti's sons—Yudhishthira, Bhima, and Arjuna—become central figures in the epic, Madri's twins, Nakula and Sahadeva, play relatively minor roles. J. A. B. van Buitenen, translator of the Critical Edition, views Madri as holding a lower status than Kunti, citing her Bahlika origin and the fact that she was purchased by Bhishma as a secondary consort—unlike Kunti, who chose Pandu in her own svayamvara (self-choice ceremony). However, Lakshmi Telidevara highlights that in other recensions of the epic, Madri herself asserts birth into a lineage superior to Kunti's, possibly referencing Kunti's Yadava background. (Note: As Hiltebeitel explains, the Yadavas are a cursed lineage, descending from Yadu. Yadu's father condemned Yadu and his descendants to have no share in royalty (Mahabharata 1.79.7). A Northern recension (1.1129) further elaborates the story, noting that Kuntibhoja arranged Kunti's svayamvara only after no king had formally sought her hand in marriage.) Hiltebeitel notes that the payment of a bride price is revealed by Shalya as a Madra custom, classifying it as a asura marriage.

Sociologist Iravati Karve regards Madri as a tragic figure, but notes that in her short life, Madri enjoys the pleasures of traditional womanhood and achieves liberation from the more burdensome existence borne by Kunti, who faces numerous hardships and intrigues, while assuming the responsibility of nurturing Madri's children—Nakula and Sahadeva—often with greater devotion than she extends to her own. Bhattacharya sees Madri's ultimate recognition of Kunti's nobility and superiority in resilience, leadership and impartiality as an honest tribute to her own limitations, reflecting her lack of the "firmness of will" needed to overcome rivalry and ego. Telidevara considers it Madri's redemption as a character, where she recognizes her earlier narrow-mindedness toward Kunti and is able to shed it before departing as Pandu's loving wife.

=== Sati ===
Madri's sati or sahagamana (the act of immolation of a widow on her husband's funeral pyre) has been studied by scholars as a way to gain insights into the practice of sati during the ancient epic period. However, her case stands out as an exceptionally rare instance in the Mahabharata, where widows—aside from a few in later added chapters—do not perform sati. The verse (1.117.28) mentions Madri committed sati by mounting Pandu's funeral pyre in the forest, yet the subsequent verse (1.117.30–31) suggests that corpses of Madri and Pandu were cremated in Hastinapura, contradicting the claim that Madri perished with Pandu on the pyre. Nilakantha, a prominent 17th-century commentator on the Mahabharata, tried to reconcile these conflicting verses by suggesting that the word sarīra (typically meaning 'body') in the second verse actually refers to asthi (bones or remains). By this interpretation, Madri did indeed immolate herself with Pandu, and the "bodies" brought to Hastinapura were, in fact, their ashes or charred remains, not their intact corpses. This interpretation has been considered the most compelling explanation by many scholars. Madri's sati has been often cited as the earliest clear mention of the practice in Indian literature, although it is also noted that, in this instance, the practice is extremely rare and entirely voluntary—even discouraged by sages—in contrast to the medieval period.

However, due to the contradiction found in the texts, some scholars have also questioned the authenticity of the sati account. While the scene is included in the Critical Edition of the Mahabharata, V. S. Sukthankar, the General Editor of the Critical Edition, expressed his dissatisfaction with Nilakantha's interpretation and acknowledged the internal contradictions and the challenge of reconciling the two accounts—since both conflicting accounts are found in all manuscripts, both were included in the Critical Edition. Drawing on the views of Edward Washburn Hopkins, Sukthankar highlights details such as the anointing and dressing of Pandu's body and a verse that states he appeared as though alive (Mahābhārata 1.118.20), implying that no cremation had yet occurred. He adds that after Pandu had been burned with Madri on the funeral pyre, there could not have been, much of a corpse left—certainly not enough to dress and anoint with sandal paste.

M. A. Mehendale, a scholar affiliated with BORI, rejects Nilakantha's explanation, emphasizing that the dual number in the Sanskrit text denotes two complete bodies. He argues that the conflicting accounts arise from textual conflation caused by an interpolation—where an external narrative was inserted without regard for internal consistency. Based on internal and external evidence, Mehendale suggests that the verses describing Madri's self-immolation are likely later additions to the epic. He also theorizes the existence of now-lost verses that may have described Madri's death, with both bodies preserved during the seventeen-day journey from Shatashringa to Hastinapura. In contrast, Sadashiv A. Dange questions the plausibility of preserving corpses for seventeen days and challenges Mehendale's assumptions by referring to Vedic ritualistic traditions. In these contexts, a symbolic "body" was often a ceremonial object used in secondary cremations, especially for those who died far from home, eliminating any contradiction with the earlier account of Madri's sati. He argues that the term śarīra can also denote ritual substitutes—such as urns (kumbhas) filled with bones or effigies made of twigs and barley paste. Dange interprets the "two bodies" brought to Hastinapura as such symbolic constructs. (Note: Dange defends Nilakantha's gloss of śarīra as asthi, showing that in ritual contexts, even jars of bones were treated as "bodies" and given full funerary treatment, including clothing, ornaments, and anointment.) In response, Mehendale finds this interpretation unconvincing, maintaining that the text repeatedly implies the presence of complete bodies rather than symbolic remains. He proposes that the sages transporting them were rishi-siddhas—supernatural beings capable of preserving the dead. (Note: Mehendale argues that these sages miraculously disappeared after delivering the corpses, further supporting their identification as supernatural rishi-siddhas.) Mehendale ultimately reasserts that the account in which Madri dies naturally—perhaps from shock following Pandu's death—is more likely the original version, supported by the fact that sati is absent among Kuru, Panchala, and Matsya women.

Devdutt Pattanaik supports the theory of interpolation and argues that such inconsistencies reflect later cultural and textual interpolations during the medieval period. (Note: Pattanaik points to further contradictions in Mahabharata episodes, such as the account of Krishna's death, where some of his wives perform sati while others choose asceticism, and other episodes in which widows, like those of the Kauravas or figures from the other epic Ramayana like Tara and Mandodari, do not immolate themselves.) The discrepancies suggest that later writers may have modified the scenes to reflect medieval values that promoted widow immolation as a mark of honor and loyalty. Regarding the alternative account, Pattanaik suggests that if Madri's body was indeed delivered to Hastinapur, it is likely she died immediately alongside Pandu due to the curse placed on him by the sage, since Pandu's arrows had killed both the sage and his wife.

== Beyond the Mahabharata ==
Beyond the epic, Madri finds mentions in the Puranic genre of Hindu literature, such as the Bhagavata Purana, Matsya Purana and Vayu Purana, which attest mythological stories and genealogies.

Madri also appears in the Jain retellings of the Mahabharata, most notably in Devaprabhasuri's Pandavacharita. In folktales and regional adaptations across the subcontinent, Madri appears in prominence in the Pandava-lila—a traditional performance art in the Garhwal division of Uttarakhand—and Sarala Mahabharata—15th century Odia retelling by Sarala Das. However, her portrayal and story deviate significantly from the epic narrative.
