= Pandava =

Group of five brothers in the epic Mahabharata

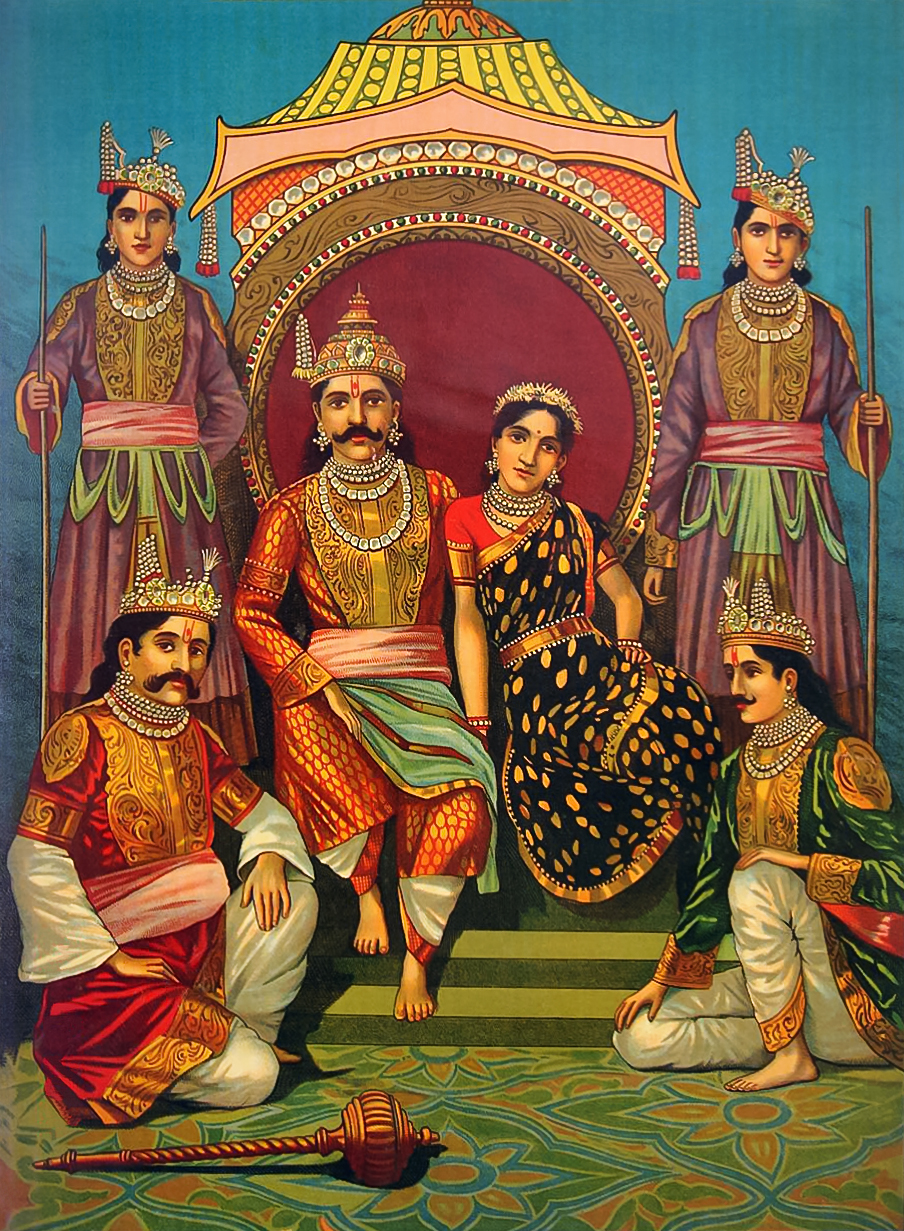
A print by Ravi Varma Press depicting the Pandava brothers—Yudhishthira (centre), Bhima (bottom left), Arjuna (bottom right), Nakula, and Sahadeva (both standing beside the throne)—with their common consort, Draupadi

The Pandavas (Sanskrit: पाण्डव, IAST: Pāṇḍava) is a patronymic referring to the five legendary brothers, Yudhishthira, Bhima, Arjuna, Nakula, and Sahadeva, who are central figures of the ancient Hindu epic Mahabharata. They are acknowledged as the sons of Pandu, the King of Kuru, but were fathered by different Devas (gods) due to Pandu's cursed inability to naturally sire children. In the epic, the Pandavas married Draupadi, the princess of Panchala, and founded the city of Indraprastha after the Kuru Kingdom was split to avoid succession disputes. After the split, the other part of the kingdom was ruled by their cousins, the Kauravas. However, the Pandavas lost their kingdom to Duryodhana (eldest and king of the Kauravas) when Yudhishthira gambled it away during a game of dice. The bet Yudhishthira agreed to was that the Pandavas would hand the kingdom over to the Kauravas and go into exile for 12 years followed by a year in hiding. After this time the Kauravas refused to return the kingdom. As a result, the Pandavas waged a civil war against their extended family, and this conflict is known as the Kurukshetra War. With the help of the god Krishna, the Pandavas eventually won the war with the death of the Kauravas, albeit at great cost.

== Etymology ==
The word Pandava (Sanskrit: पाण्डवा, IAST: Pāṇḍavā) is derived from Pandu (Sanskrit: पाण्डु, IAST: Pāṇḍu) and means "descendants of Pandu". Other epithets given to the Pandavas are:

- Pāṇḍuputra (Sanskrit: पाण्डुपुत्र) – sons of Pandu
- Pāṇḍavakumāra (Sanskrit: पाण्डवकुमार) – young Pandavas
- Kaunteya (Sanskrit: कौन्तेय) – sons of Kunti (Yudhishthira, Bhima, Arjuna).
- Mādreya (Sanskrit: माद्रेय) – sons of Madri (Nakula and Sahadeva)

== Description of the Pandavas ==
The Pandava brothers had a polygamous marriage to Draupadi. In Section 268 of Vana Parva of the epic, Draupadi describes the Pandavas to Jayadratha after he abducted her and the Pandavas are in pursuit.

- Yudhishthira was slender, and had a prominent nose, large eyes and a complexion like that of "pure gold". He is also described as a just man, who had correct knowledge of the morality of his own acts and was merciful to surrendering foes.
- Bhima is described being fair-golden complexioned (Gaura), plump, long-armed and tall as a full-grown Sala tree. He is also extolled to be strong, well-trained, endued with great might and his superhuman feats had earned him great renown. In a display of ferocity, he bit his lips, and contracted his forehead to bring the two eyebrows together. Bhima is also described to be frightful, who never forgot a foe and was not pacified even after he wreaked his vengeance.
- Arjuna is described as being dark complexioned (Syama), extremely handsome and praised as the greatest of archers, intelligent, second to none "with senses under complete control." Neither lust nor fear nor anger could make him forsake virtue. Though capable of withstanding any foe, he would never commit an act of cruelty.
- Nakula was considered by Draupadi as "the most handsome person in the whole world." An accomplished master swordsman, he was also "versed in every question of morality and profit" and "endued with high wisdom." He was unflinchingly devoted to his brothers, who in turn regarded him as more valuable than their own lives.
- Sahadeva was heroic, intelligent, wise and no other man was equal unto him in intelligence or in eloquence amid assemblies of the wise. He was the one dearest to Kunti, and intent on doing what is agreeable to Yudhishthira. He is also praised to be always mindful of the duties of Kshatriyas (warrior -class), and would sacrifice his own life than say anything that is opposed to morals.

== Legend ==
=== Birth and parentage ===
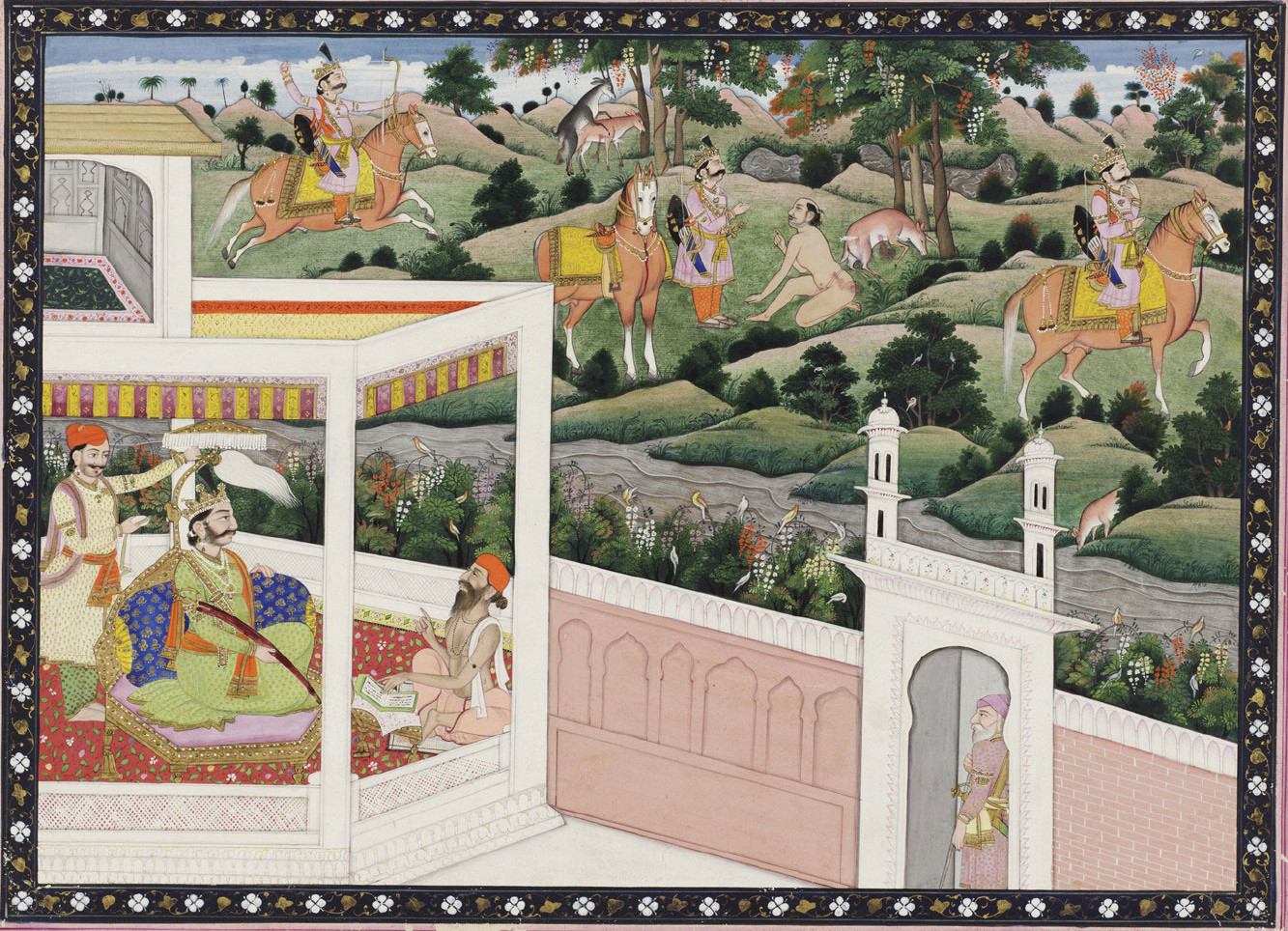
Pandu shoots Kindama, who is disguised as a deer.

According to the Adi Parva of the epic, Pandu was crowned as the king of the Kuru kingdom despite being younger than his elder brother Dhritrashtra, who was denied the throne for being blind. He married Kunti, a princess of the Yadu clan, and Madri, the princess of Madra Kingdom. Once he was hunting in a forest when he shot a copulating pair of deer. However, they turn out to be a sage named Kindama and his wife, who had used their divine powers to take the form of the animals. Enraged, Kindama berated the king for having killed him before he had finished the act of mating and before dying, he cursed Pandu that he would die the moment he touched his wife intending to have sex. After the event Pandu voluntarily renounced royal life as penance, leaving the Kingdom under Dhritarashtra. Kunti and Madri accompanied Pandu and together they lived in a forest.

Before her marriage, Kunti was blessed with a boon by the sage Durvasa, that she could have a son by any god whom she respects without having any marital affair. After Pandu learned of this, he asked her to perform niyoga and bear him sons using the boon. The first three of the Pandavas were the sons of Kunti, while the younger two were born to Madri after Kunti shared her mantra with her at Pandu's request. The divine fathers of the Pandavas were:

- Dharmadeva, the god of dharma, who fathered Yudhishthira
- Vayu, the god of wind, who fathered Bhima
- Indra, the god of rain and the king of gods, who fathered Arjuna
- The Ashvins, the twin gods of health and medicine, who fathered the twins Nakula and Sahadeva.

=== Upbringing and rivalry with the Kauravas ===
A few years later after the birth of the Pandavas, Pandu died after trying to have a union with Madri and the latter immolated herself out of remorse. Kunti brought the Pandavas back to Hastinapura, the capital of Kuru, and they were raised together with their cousins, the Kauravas, who were the hundred sons of Dhritrashtra. The Pandavas were guided and taught by Bhishma, Vidura, and Kripa.

Duryodhana, the eldest of the Kauravas, refused to accept the Pandavas as his cousins. This usually led to much tension between the cousins. Insecure and jealous, Duryodhana harbored an intense hatred for the five brothers throughout his childhood and youth and following the advice of his maternal uncle Shakuni, often plotted to get rid of them to clear his path to the lordship of the Kuru Dynasty.

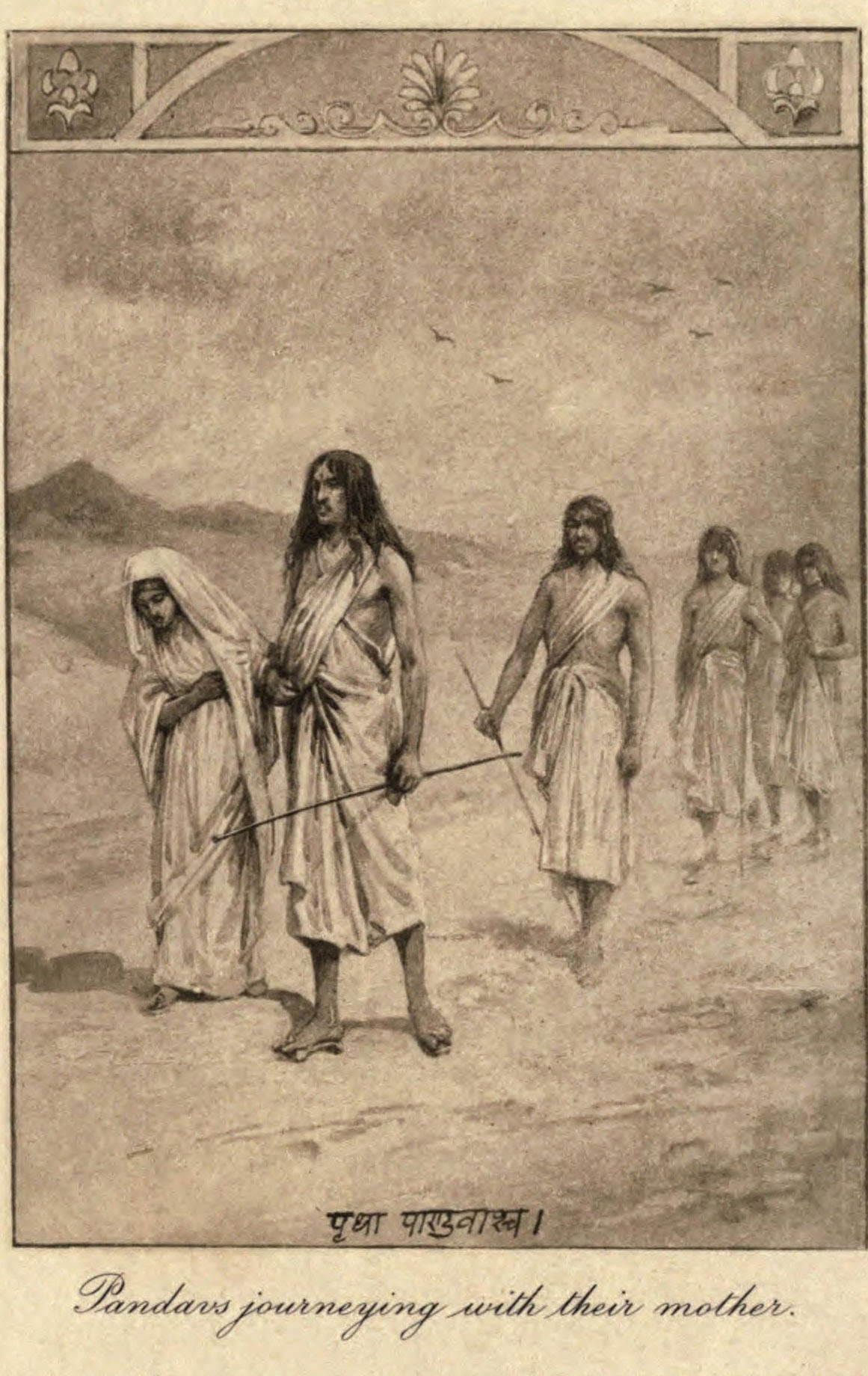
Pandavas journeying with their mother

This plotting took a grave turn when Dhritarashtra had to relent to the will of the masses and rightfully appointed his nephew Yudhishthira as crown prince. This went against the personal ambitions of both father and son (Dhritarashtra and Duryodhana) and drove Duryodhana into such a rage that he enthusiastically agreed to an evil ploy by Shakuni to murder Yudhishthira. Shakuni commissioned the construction of a palace in Varnavarta, secretly built by incorporating flammable materials like oil, ghee etc. into the structure, most notably the lacquer known as lac. This palace was known as Lakshagriha. Duryodhana then successfully lobbied Dhritarashtra to send Yudhishthira to represent the royal household in Varnavarta during the celebrations of Shiva Mahotsava. The plan was to set the palace on fire during the night while Yudhishthira would likely be asleep. Yudhishthira left for Varnavrata, accompanied by his four brothers and their mother Kunti. The plan was discovered by their paternal uncle Vidura, who was very loyal to them and an extraordinarily wise man. In addition, Yudhishthira had been forewarned about this plot by a hermit who came to him and spoke of an imminent disaster. Vidura arranged for a tunnel to be secretly built for the Pandavas to safely escape the palace as it was set afire.

=== Marriages and children ===
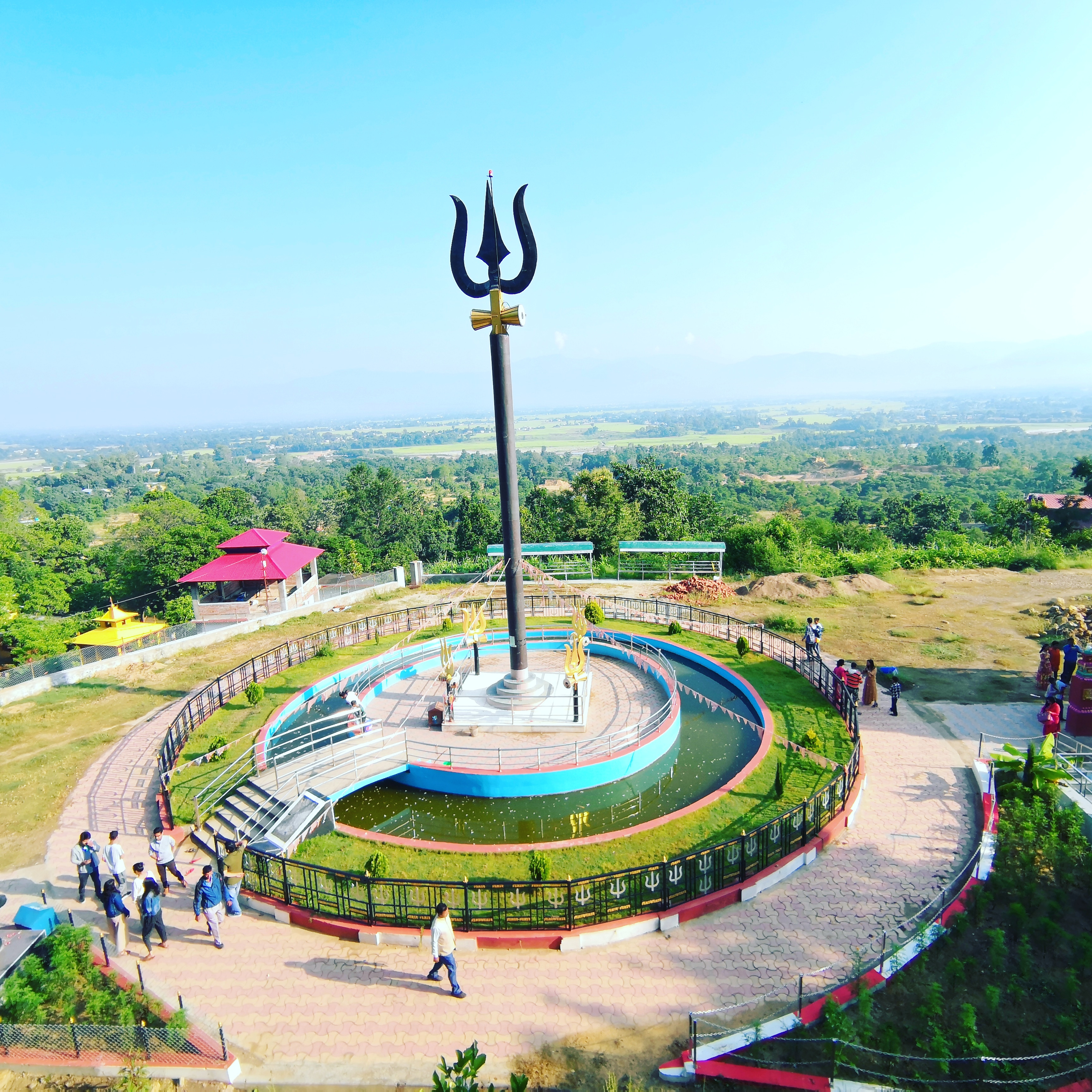
Pandaveswor (lord of the Pandavas) temple in Dang valley, Nepal situated between Sivalik Hills and Mahabharata hills

The Pandavas had polyandrous marriage with Draupadi, the princess of Panchala Kingdom who was prophesied to bring the end of the Kauravas. The Adi Parva narrates that after their flight from the palace, the five brothers lived in the forests for some time disguised as Brahmins. They heard from a group of travelling sages about a contest (svayamvara) being held in the Kingdom of Panchala that offered Draupadi's hand in marriage to the winner. The svayamvara turned out to rely on the skills of archery, and Arjuna, who was a peerless archer, entered the competition and won. When the brothers took Draupadi to introduce her to their mother, they jokingly announced to Kunti that they had arrived with excellent alms. Kunti was busy with some work and replied without turning to look at Draupadi (who the alms referred to) ordering the brothers to share the alms equally amongst the five of them. Even when uttered erroneously, their mother's word was supreme for the Pandavas, and they agreed to share the princess, who was subsequently married to all five brothers. To prevent jealousy among the brothers and identify the paternity of Draupadi's children, the Pandavas followed a condition in which one brother was given a year with her and others were forbidden to enter her chamber. If the condition was violated, the brother, who entered the room, had to go on a pilgrimage for 1 year. Arjuna was the only one to violate this condition.

Each Pandava had a son with Draupadi and they were collectively referred to as Draupadeyas; their names were Prativindhya (fathered by Yudhishthira), Sutasoma (fathered by Bhima), Shrutakarma (fathered by Arjuna), Shatanika (fathered by Nakula), and Shrutasena (fathered by Sahadeva).

Besides Draupadi, each Pandava had their own wife with whom they had a son:

- Yudhishthira was also married to Devika, the daughter of the king of the Sivi Kingdom, and had a son named Yaudheya.
- Bhima had two other wives—the rakshasi (demoness) Hidimbi and Valandhara, a princess of the Kingdom of Kashi. Hidimbi was the mother of Ghatotkacha, while Savarga was the son of Valandhara.
- Arjuna had three other wives—Ulupi, a naga woman with whom he had Iravan; Chitrangada, the princess of Manipura, who became the mother of Babhruvahana; and Subhadra, the sister of Krishna and the mother of Abhimanyu.
- Nakula had a wife named Karenumati, daughter of king of Chedi, and had a son named Niramitra.
- Sahadeva was married to Vijaya, princess of Madra, and had a son named Suhotra.

Later in the Ashramvasika Parva, the character Sanjaya mentions two other wives of the Pandavas—a sister of Chedi king Shishupala who is the wife of Bhima and as the daughter of king Jarasandha of Magadha who is the wife of Sahadeva. Simon Brodbeck theorizes that these marriages might have taken place after the Kurukshetra War, as these unnamed wives not mentioned elsewhere.

=== Indraprastha ===
When Dhritarashtra heard that the five brothers were alive, he invited them back to the kingdom. However, in their absence, Duryodhana had succeeded in being made the crown prince. Upon the return of the Pandavas, the issue of returning Yudhishthira's crown to him was raised. Dhritarashtra led the subsequent discussions into ambiguity and agreed to a partition of the kingdom "to do justice to both crown princes". He retained the developed Hastinapura for himself and Duryodhana and gave the barren, arid and hostile lands of Khandavaprastha to the Pandavas. The Pandavas successfully developed their land and built a great and lavish city, which was considered comparable to the heavens, and thus came to be known as Indraprastha.

=== The game of dice ===
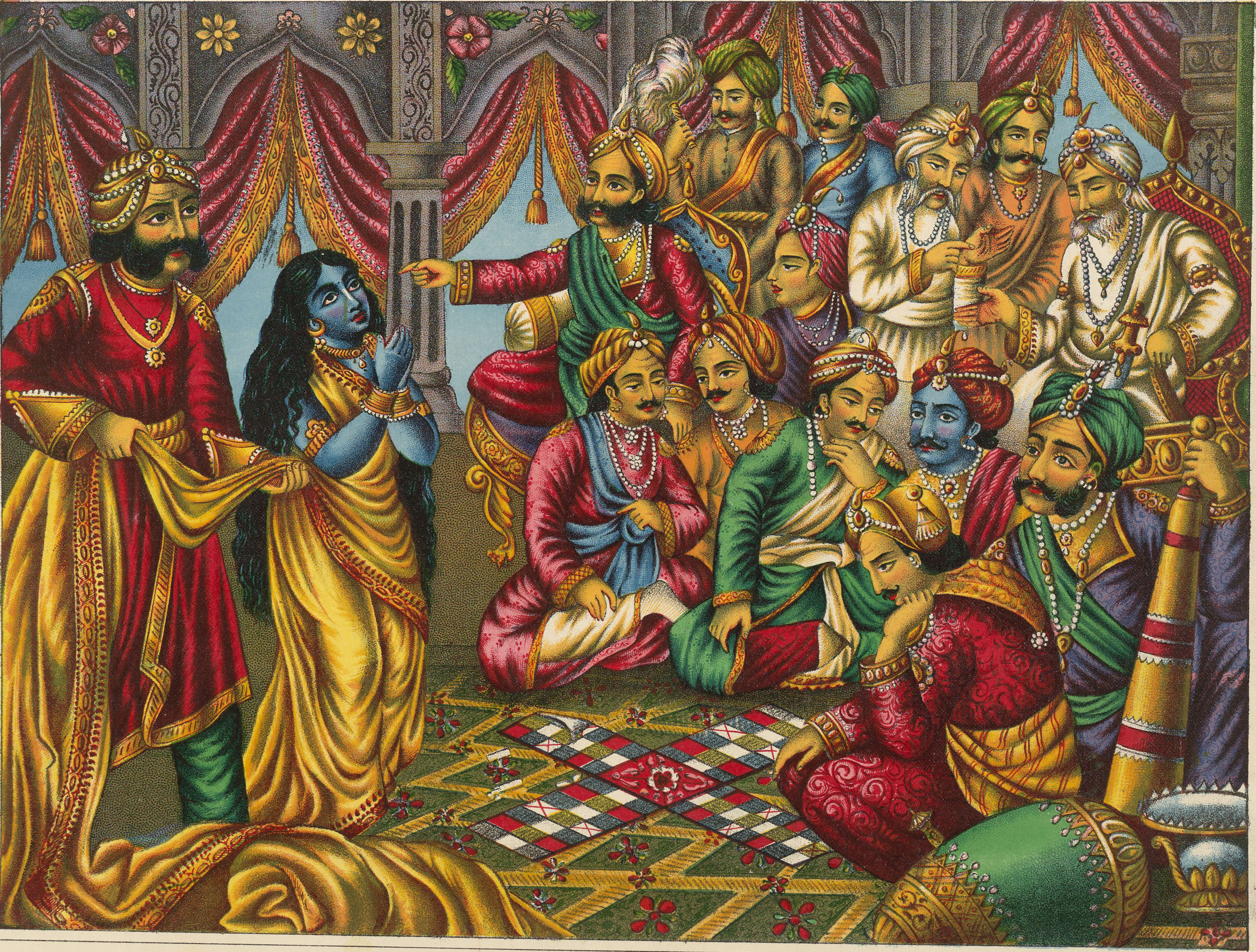
Draupadi is presented in a pachisi game where Yudhishthira has gambled away all his material wealth.

Reeling under the loss of half the lands of his future kingdom, Duryodhana's jealousy and rage were further fuelled by the Pandavas's success and prosperity. Eventually Shakuni sired yet another plot and got Duryodhana to invite the Pandavas over to his court for a game of dice (gambling). Shakuni was a master at gambling and owned a pair of dice which magically did his bidding. Owing to this, bet after bet, Yudhishthira lost all of his wealth, and eventually his kingdom, in the game. He was then enticed by Duryodhana and Shakuni to place his brothers as bets. Yudhishthira fell for it and put his brothers at stake, losing them too. He then placed himself as a bet and lost again. Duryodhana now played another trick and told Yudhishthira that he still had his wife Draupadi to place as a bet and if Yudhishthira won, he would return everything to the Pandavas. Yudhishthira fell for the ruse and bet Draupadi, losing her too. At this point, Duryodhana ordered that Draupadi, who was now a slave to him, be brought to the court. None of the Pandavas fought for their wife's honour. Duryodhana's younger brother Dushasana dragged Draupadi to the royal court, pulling her by her hair, insulting her dignity and asserting that she, like the Pandava brothers, was now their servant. This caused immense anguish to all the great warriors seated in the court, but each of them, namely, Bhishma (grandsire of the clan), Drona (teacher/guru of Kauravas and Pandavas) and Kripa except Vidura remained silent. Duryodhana then ordered Dushasana to disrobe Draupadi before everyone, as a slave girl has no rights. The elders and warriors in the audience were shocked but did not intervene. As Dushasana began to disrobe her, she prayed to Krishna to protect her honour. Krishna, using his divine powers, protected her by providing her garments with an unending length. Dushasana, shocked and tired, gave up on disrobing Draupadi. Finally, as the blind king Dhritarashtra realized that this humiliation could prompt Draupadi to curse his sons, he intervened, apologizing to Draupadi for the behaviour of his sons, and turned the winnings of the dice game back over to the Pandava brothers, releasing them from the bondage of slavery.

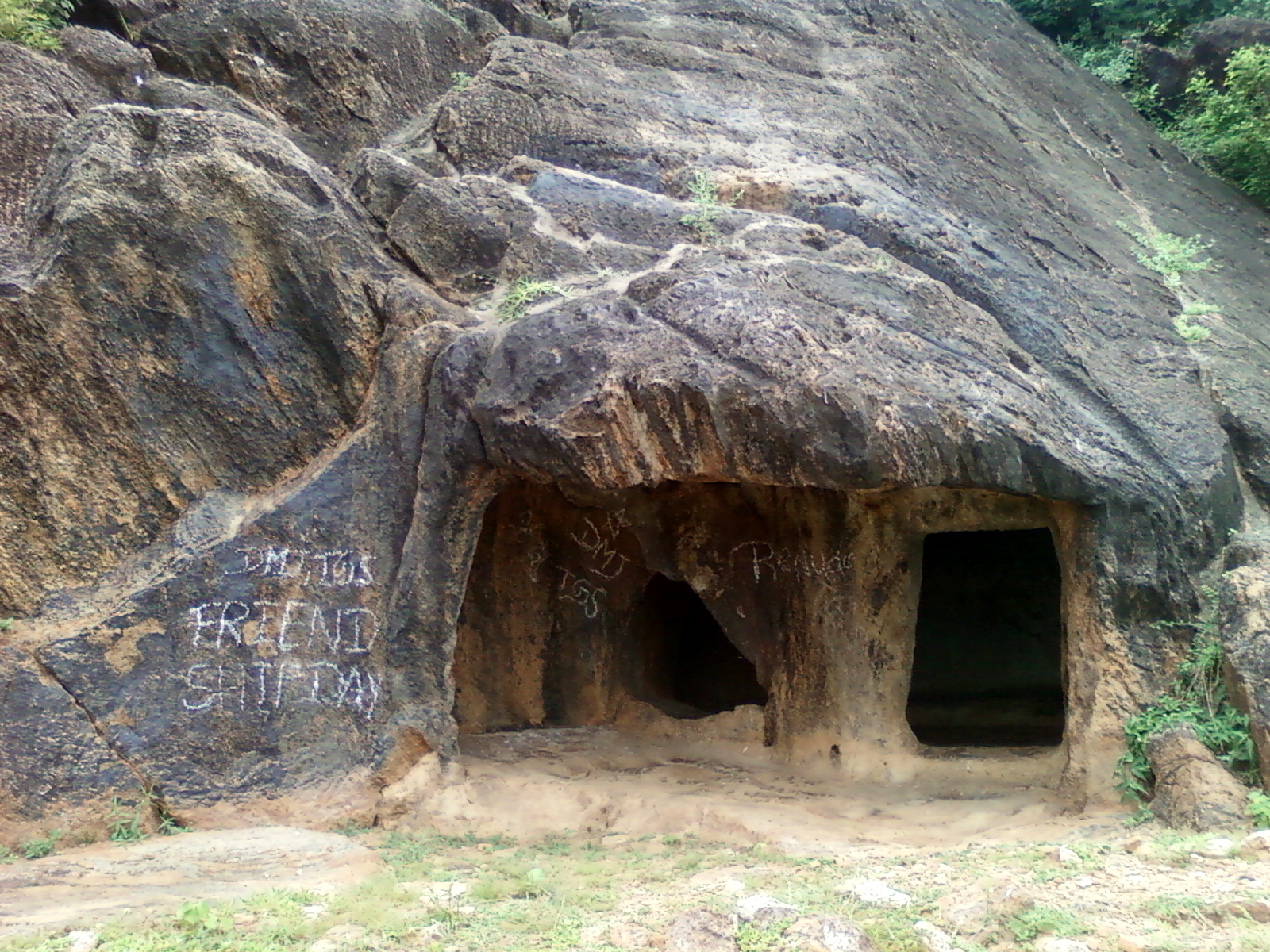
Pandava Caves: According to the historical sources Pandavas stayed here during their exile.

Incensed at the loss of all that he had won, Duryodhana threatened suicide and coerced his father into inviting the Pandavas for one last round of gambling, the terms of which were that the loser would be condemned to 12 years of exile into forests and a 13th year to be spent incognito, and if the cover is blown during the 13th year, another cycle of 13 years would ensue. Obeying their uncle's orders, the Pandavas played the round and again lost to Shakuni's cheating. However, this time, their patience had been nearly pushed to its edge.

=== Exile and incognito period ===
During the 12 years of exile in the forest, they prepared for war. Arjuna performed penance and won the entire gamut of celestial weapons (Divyastras) as boons from the gods. They spent the 13th year in ajnatavasa masquerading as peasants in the service of the royal family of Virata, the king of Matsya. Upon completion of the terms of the last bet, the Pandavas returned and demanded that their kingdom be rightfully returned to them. Duryodhana refused to yield Indraprastha. For the sake of peace and to avert a disastrous war, Krishna proposed that if Hastinapura agrees to give the Pandavas only five villages named Indraprastha (Delhi), Swarnprastha (Sonipat), Panprastha (Panipat), Vyaghrprastha (Baghpat) and Tilprastha (Tilpat) if these five villages given they would be satisfied and would make no more demands. Duryodhana vehemently refused, commenting that he would not part even with land as much as the point of a needle. Thus the stage was set for the great war, for which the epic of Mahabharata is known most of all.

=== Krishna's help to Pandavas ===
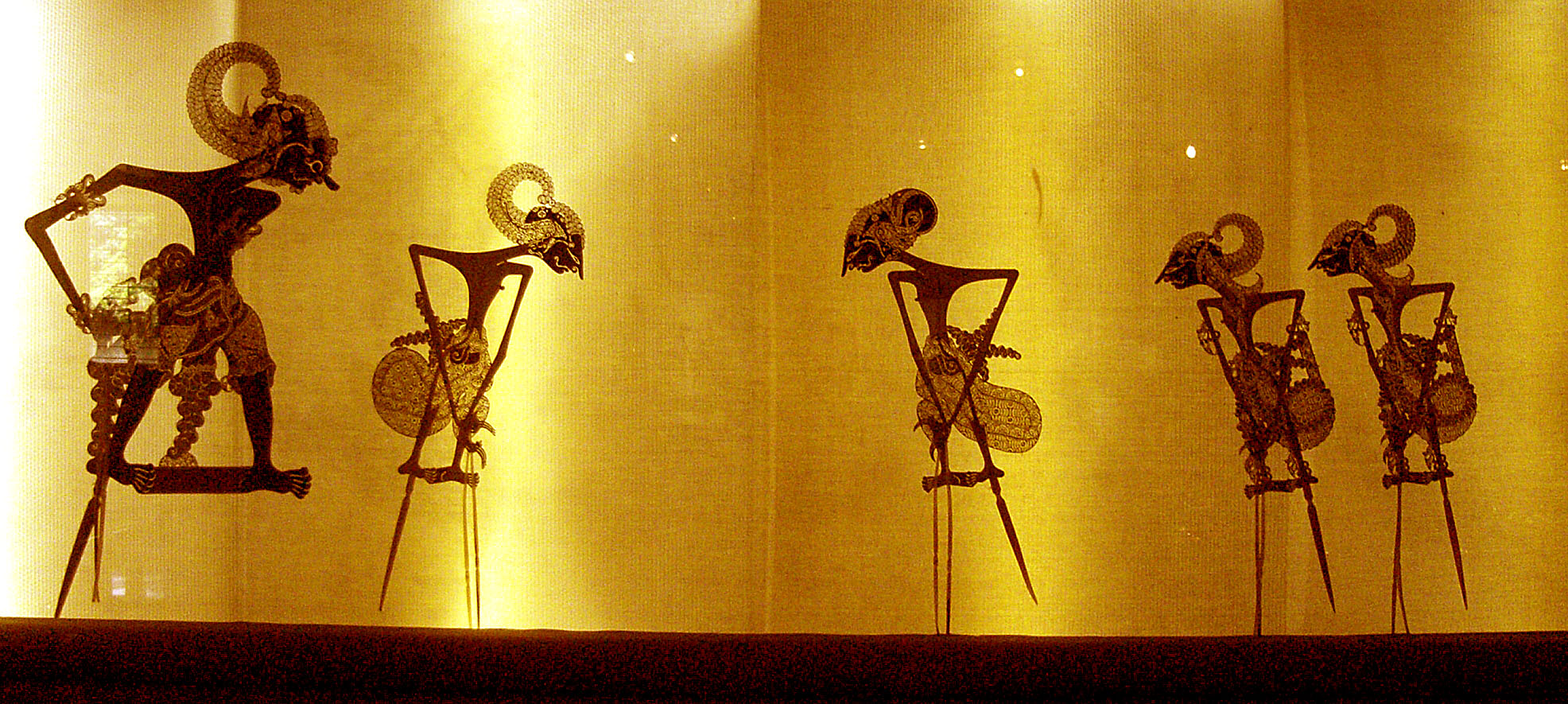
Five Pandavas in Wayang form. From left to right: Bhima, Arjuna, Yudhishthira, Nakula and Sahadeva. Indonesia Museum, Jakarta.

Krishna, being a well-wisher of the Pandavas, helped them in various ways during the time of their ordeals. When the Kurukshetra war was going to be held, both Arjuna on behalf of the Pandavas, and Duryodhana on behalf of the Kauravas, went to Krishna to seek help. Duryodhana reached first and Arjuna was just behind him. They entered Krishna's room and found him sleeping. Duryodhana sat on a raised chair near Krishna's head and Arjuna sat near Krishna's feet closing his hands. When Krishna woke up, he saw Arjuna first and asked him about the purpose of his visit. Then he found Duryodhana sitting next to him, and asked him the same question. Krishna was then told that war was going to be held and Arjuna and Duryodhana had come to him seeking his military help. To this Krishna replied that he had seen Arjuna first and so he would give him priority, and asked what he needed. He gave Arjuna two options – either his army of 100,000 soldiers or Krishna himself who shall not fight in the war. To this Arjuna immediately opted for Krishna for his help and thus Duryodhana was given Krishna's army. Duryodhana was very satisfied to have received a huge army.

=== The Kurukshetra War ===
The war was intense and lasted 18 days, over the course of which both parties worked around, bent and even broke rules of warfare. In the end, all 100 Kaurava brothers and their entire army was slain, with only three surviving on their side. The Pandavas too lost several allies but the five brothers survived. After having won the war, Yudhishthira was crowned the king. At the end of the war, only 10 survived the war on both sides, namely Ashvatthama, Kripa, and Kritavarma on the Kaurava side and the five Pandavas, Krishna and Satyaki on the Pandava side.

=== Later life ===
The Pandavas ruled Hastinapura for 36 years and established a righteous kingdom. Shortly after Krishna left the Earth, they all decided that the time had come for them to renounce the world, as the age of Kali Yuga had started.

The five Pandavas and Draupadi set forth to the path of liberation. For this purpose, they all climbed Mount Kailash, which leads to Svarga. On their way, all except Yudhishthira slipped and died one by one. Yudhishthira was accompanied by a dog who was none other than Yama himself.

The first to die was Draupadi; she was imperfect because she loved Arjuna more than her other husbands. Then it was Sahadeva, imperfect because he was overconfident about his knowledge in science. He was followed by Nakula, imperfect because he was over-enthusiastic about his good looks. Then fell Arjuna, imperfect because he was proud of his skills—he challenged Hanuman and Shiva. Next was Bhima, imperfect because he killed his enemies brutally—thus enjoyed their sufferings. Only the eldest Pandava, Yudhishthira, reached the door of Svarga (heaven), carried on Indra's chariot. On reaching heaven, he did not find either his virtuous brothers or his wife Draupadi. Instead, he finds Karna sitting on a divine throne.

He wanted an explanation from Yama, the lord of death. Yama explained that the Kauravas had been allowed into heaven because they died as warriors on the battlefield. This earned them so much merit and credit that it wiped out all their debts. Yudhishthira demanded to know where his brothers and his wife were. He was then taken to hell. Yama explained that they were experiencing the reactions of their actions but it was temporary. Once the debt had been repaid, they would join them in Svarga. Yudhishthira loyally met his brothers, but the sight and sound of gore and blood horrified him. Though initially he was tempted to flee, he mastered himself and remained after hearing the voices of his beloved brothers and Draupadi calling out to him, asking him to stay with them in their misery. Yudhishthira decided to remain, ordering the divine charioteer to return. He preferred to live in hell with good people than in the heaven of his enemies. Eventually, this turned out to be another illusion to test him. Yama explained to Yudhishthira that it was all illusion created by Yama himself. It was a punishment to Yudhishthira to feel sad and soak tears on seeing his beloved ones being punished. It was because Drona felt sad on hearing fake news that his son was dead. Yudhishthira told the message incompletely due to which Drona felt sad and cried in grief. Because of this, Yudhishthira had to feel sad in a similar manner. Hence Yama created this illusion. In reality, Pandavas and Draupadi reached heaven just after their deaths. Yama explained everything and Yudhishthira reached heaven with his mortal body. Pandavas were the incarnation of previous Indra's. After the Duration, the lifespan of Indra, is completed Krishna assures Pandavas of offering them Moksha for their Devotion and purity.

== In art ==
The Harivamsa Purana (8th century CE) narrates the Jain version of their story. In the Garhwal region of Uttarakhand, there has been a long tradition of villagers performing the Pandav Lila, a ritual re-enactment of episodes from the Mahabharata through singing, dancing and recitation. In the performance, the actors spontaneously break into a dance when, it is believed, they become "possessed" by the spirits of their characters.

== See also ==
- Draupadeyas
- Kurukshetra War
- Mahabharata
- Bhubaneswar
- Krishna
- Kaurava
