= Pandava Caves =

Caves in Mangalore, Karnataka, India

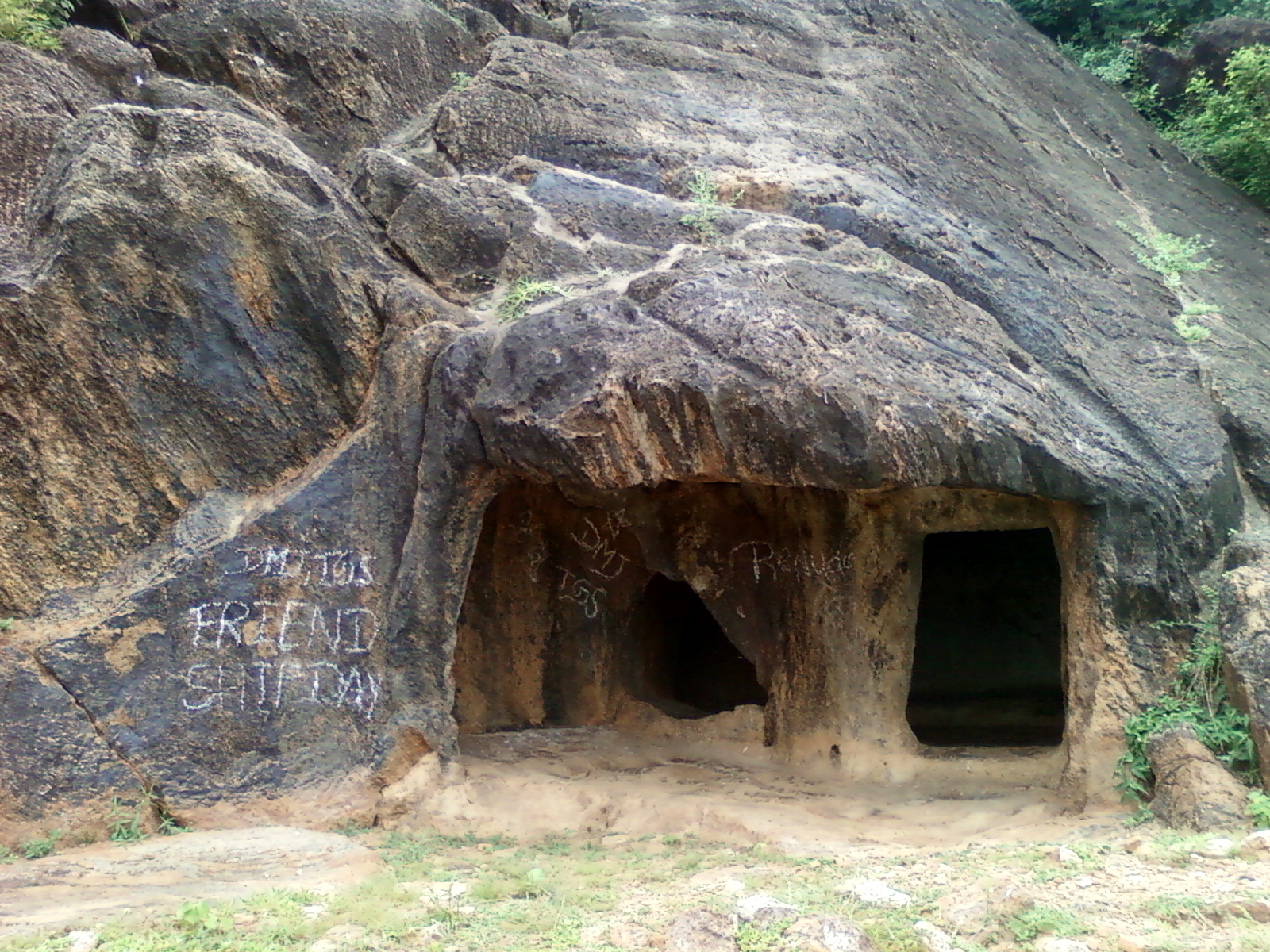
Pandava Caves: According to the mythological sources Pandavas stayed here during their exile.

The Pandava Caves are a group of caves located near Kadri Manjunath temple in Mangaluru, Karnataka, India. Historians found that the current temple was a Buddhist monastery known as Kandarika Vihara. The shrine had a standing Buddha image in it. This image was replaced by the King Kundvarma of the Alupa dynasty, who was a devotee of Shiva. However, it was not the Buddha but a bodhisattva who was historically integrated with Shiva. Historians concluded that the vihara was originally a centre of the cult of the bodhisattva Manjusri. This temple was one of the famous centres of learning and pilgrimage until the 11th century CE. This particular doctrine opened the doors for Tantric religion. Both Shilinga and the bodhisattva were worshipped for many centuries until the Buddhist temple was converted to a purely Saivite temple.

According to the mythological sources, Pandavas stayed here during their exile in the Mahabharata period. It is said by the locals that whoever entered these caves never returned. The locals also say that these caves are so long that through it one can reach Kashi in the north.
