= Madreya =

Sons of Madri in Hinduism

The Madreya (Sanskrit: माद्रेय, romanized: Mādreya) are the sons of Madri featured in the Mahabharata. They are the youngest among the five Pandavas. The Madreya are born to Madri when she chants a mantra to invoke the Ashvin twins, though they are legally regarded to be the sons of Pandu.

The Madreya are:

- Nakula - Nakula is the son of Madri and the Ashvin named Nasatya.
- Sahadeva - Sahadeva is the son of Madri and the Ashvin named Dasra.
