= Agnikaryam =

Hindu ritual of fire-oblation

Agnikaryam (Sanskrit: अग्निकार्यम्, romanized: Agnikāryam) or Agnikarya is the act of offering oblations to the sacrificial fire of a yajna (ritual-fire ceremony) performed by brahmacharis (celibate bachelors).

== Description ==
The agnikaryam is dedicated to and named after the god of fire, Agni. The fire of the agnikaryam is conceptualised as a cosmic element during the performance of the rite. It is featured in the text Sarasvati Suktam.

The agnikaryam is performed with the help of samits or small wooden sticks or twigs usually of arali (Ficus religiosa) tree. This homa is performed daily twice: once in the morning and again in the evening. These two are respectively called the pratah agnikaryam and the sayam agnikaryam. The agnikaryam is also known as samidadhanam. The method and mantras of performing the agnikaryam are different for the Rigveda and the Yajurveda.
