= Asura marriage =

Form of marriage described in Hindu texts

The Asura marriage (Sanskrit: आसुरविवाह, romanized: Āsuravivāha) is a non-righteous form of marriage in Hinduism. It is a form of marriage where a bridegroom receives a maiden, after having given of his own free will as much wealth as he can afford, to the bride, and her kinsmen. As a form of marriage performed by paying a bride price, it is generally stated to be forbidden. It is described to be a grave sin in the Manusmriti.

== Description ==
When a man (groom) carries away a woman (bride or maiden) after giving wealth as may be sought by her father on the plea to recover the money spent on her upbringing, it is called Asura marriage. This form of marriage is not recommended for Hindus. Typically, it depends on will and desire of man and his wealth but irrespective of willingness of bride.

This type of marriage literally amounts to purchasing the bride by a paying a price to her kinsmen. By taking undue advantage of this type a marriage, a rich but incompetent man can have as many wives but a poor and competent man may not be able to afford the money to be paid. Also, the consent of the girl in question might be absent, or she might be coerced into the marriage by her father for his own selfish, monetary motives and gains. For such reasons, this type of marriage is not considered as dignified but viewed as lowly, and is strictly prohibited in not only Hindu but also Buddhist and Jain societies.
