= Kaunteya =

Sanskrit epithet

Kaunteya (Sanskrit: कौन्तेय, romanized: Kaunteya, lit. 'Son of Kunti') refers to the epithets of Karna, Yudhishthira, Bhima, and Arjuna, the children of Kunti in the Hindu epic Mahabharata.
