= List of Kuru kings =

Raja of Kuru
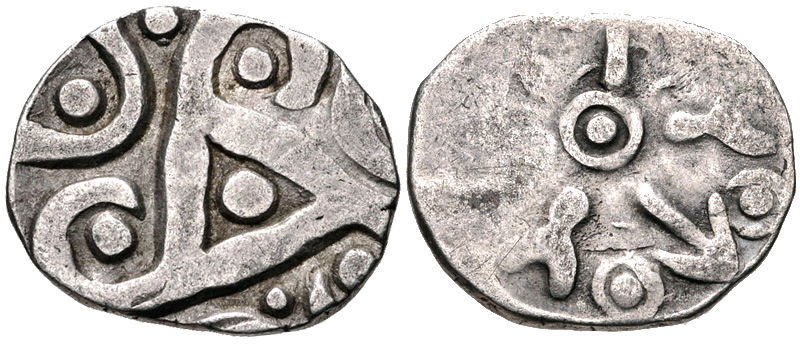
- A Karshapana (½ silver coin) of Kuru ruler
- Last to reign Kṣemaka; 350s BCE

Details
- Style: His Majesty
- First monarch: Vidhuratha I (as the successor to the Puru king)
- Last monarch: Kṣemaka
- Formed: c. 1200 BCE
- Abolished: c. 350 BCE
- Residences: Hastinapura; Indraprastha; Kosambi
- Appointer: Sabhā

Kuru was an ancient Indian kingdom. The kingdom emerged as a branch of the Rigvedic Puru Tribe (one of the Pāñcajanya) and the Rigvedic Bharata Tribe; perhaps it was a fusion of the two. It lasted until the Nandas (Mahapadma Nanda) of Magadha dethroned them in 350s BCE. The Kuru kingdom is famous for its role in the epic Mahabharata and Kurukshetra War. Its capital was Hastinapura, Āsandīvat (notably during the period of Parīkṣit; the son of Abhimanyu), Kausambhi (after Hastinapuri was flooded) and Indraprastha (temporarily during the Mahbharata and later on during the Mahajanapadas period). Kuru was among the sixteen Mahajanapadas.

Kuru is often paired with Panchala and referred to by the compound form Kuru-Pañcāla. This area formed the core of Madhyadeśa and Āryāvarta and would be the site of major religious development of the Historical Vedic Religion into Brahmanism.

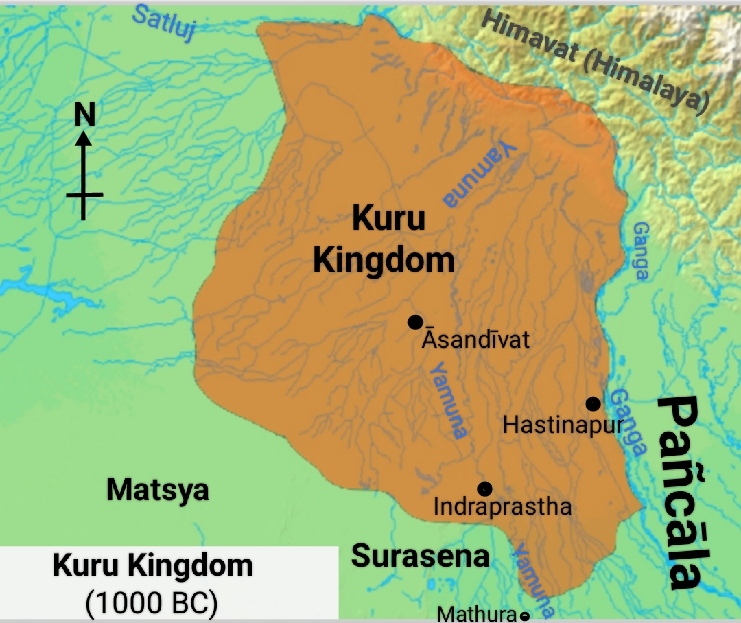
Core region of Kurus

The area of the Kuru kingdom at its peak included:

- Brahmāvarta (Kurukṣetra): Area between Sarasvatī and Dṛṣadvatī (perhaps the holiest land in Hinduism). The foremost amongst lands of rites and sacrifices.
- Āryāvarta: West of Vinasana (where the Sarasvati disappears) and west of the Black Forest (Kalakavana), to the north of the Pariyatra mountains, and to the south of the Himalayas (Baudhayana Dharmasutra 1.1.2.9). Kalakvana's location remains unidentified. Moreover the area of Āryāvarta was broadened in the later times.
- Madhyadeśa: Consisting the areas which later became the three Mahjanapadas of Kuru, Panchala and Vatsa. The tract of land between the Himavat (Himalayas) and the Vindhya mountains, east of Prayaga and west of Vinasana (where the Sarasvati disappears), is called Madhyadesa (Manusmriti 2.21–2.22).

== Origin and lineage of Kuru kings ==
King Kuru II of Puru dynasty after whom the dynasty was named 'Kuruvansha' or 'Kaurava'. After his name, the district in Haryana was called as Kurukshetra. By the glory, zenith and name of this king the dynasty hence renamed from Bharatas to Kuru Kingdom. After these Kings several kings of this dynasty established several kingdoms. He had three sons, namely Vidhuratha I who became the ruler of Pratisthana, Vyushitaswa who died at a very young age, and Sudhanva, whose lineage (through Uparichara Vasu) eventually became the ruler of Magadha. Henceforth, Vidhuratha became the first kuru king of Hastinapura.

== List of kings ==
1. Bharatha
2. Jahnu
3. Suratha
4. Vidhur At II
5. Sarvabhauma II
6. Jayasena
7. Radhika
8. Attaya
9. Akrodhana II
10. Devatha Thi II
11. Riksha III
12. Dilipa
13. Ana Swan II
14. Parikshit II
15. Janamejaya III
16. Bheemasena
17. Pratiksha
18. Pratipa
19. Shantanu
20. Chitrāngada
21. Vichitravirya
22. Pandu
23. Dhritarashtra II
24. The Kauravas, led by Duryodhana (sons of Dhritarashtra and Gandhari, who were slain in the Kurukshetra War).
25. The Pandavas, led by Chakravarti Samrat Yudhishthira (who were the main protagonists of the Mahabharata).
26. Parikshit III was the son of Abhimanyu; and grandson of the Pandava Arjuna
27. Janamejaya
28. Śatānīka
29. Ashwaa
30. Adhisimakrishna
31. Nicakṣu
32. Citra Pratha
33. Sunega
34. Sunita
35. Nanak
36. Sikhana
37. Pari Plava
38. Sunaya
39. Nagaraja
40. Timi
41. Bṛhadratha
42. Sudarshan
43. Śatañika
44. Udayana
45. Mahindra
46. Nimi

== Kuru family tree ==
This shows the line of royal and family succession, not necessarily the parentage. See the notes below for detail.

Kuru family tree

Kuru^{[a]}
Anasawan^{[a]}
Bheemasena(1)^{[a]}
Pratisravas^{[a]}
Pratipa^{[a]}
Gangā	Shāntanu^{[a]}	Satyavati	Pārāshara
Bhishma	Chitrāngada	Ambikā	Vichitravirya	Ambālikā	Vyāsa
Dhritarāshtra^{b}	Gāndhāri	Shakuni	Surya (Deva)	Kunti	Pāndu^{b}	Mādri
Karna^{c}	Yudhishthira^{d}	Bhima^{d}	Arjuna^{d}	Subhadrā	Nakula^{d}	Sahadeva^{d}
Duryodhana^{e}	Dussalā	Dushāsana	(98 sons)
Abhimanyu^{f}	Uttarā
Parikshit	Madravti
Janamejaya

Key to Symbols

- Male: blue border
- Female: red border
- Pandavas: green box
- Kauravas: yellow box

Notes

- a: Shantanu was a king of the Kuru dynasty or kingdom, and was some generations removed from any ancestor called Kuru. His marriage to Ganga preceded his marriage to Satyavati.
- b: Pandu and Dhritarashtra were fathered by Vyasa in the niyoga tradition after Vichitravirya's death. Dhritarashtra, Pandu and Vidura were the sons of Vyasa with Ambika, Ambalika and a maid servant respectively.
- c: Karna was born to Kunti through her invocation of Surya, before her marriage to Pandu.
- d: Yudhishthira, Bhima, Arjuna, Nakula and Sahadeva were acknowledged sons of Pandu but were begotten by the invocation by Kunti and Madri of various deities. They all married Draupadi (not shown in tree).
- e: Duryodhana and his siblings were born at the same time, and they were of the same generation as their Pandava cousins.
- f : Although the succession after the Pandavas was through the descendants of Arjuna and Subhadra, it was Yudhishthira and Draupadi who occupied the throne of Hastinapura after the great battle.

The birth order of siblings is correctly shown in the family tree (from left to right), except for Vyasa and Bhishma whose birth order is not described, and Vichitravirya and Chitrangada who were born after them. The fact that Ambika and Ambalika are sisters is not shown in the family tree. The birth of Duryodhana took place after the birth of Karna and Yudhishthira, but before the birth of the remaining Pandava brothers.

Some siblings of the characters shown here have been left out for clarity; this includes Vidura, half-brother to Dhritarashtra and Pandu.

=== Family of Pandavas ===
Pandavas means sons of King Pandu. Pandavas were five in number as: Yudhishtira, Bhima, Arjuna, Nakula and Sahadeva. The first three of five Pandavas were the sons of Kunti and Pandu while the younger two were born to Madri after Pandu's request.

- Yaudheya was the son of Yudhishthira and Devika.
- Ghatotkacha was the son of Bhima and Hidimbi.
- Abhimanyu was the son of Arjuna and Subhadra.
- Babruvahana was the son of Arjuna and Chitrāngadā.
- Iravan was the son of Arjuna and Ulupi.
- Niramitra was the son of Nakula and Karenumati.
- Suhotra was the son of Sahadeva and Queen Vijaya.
- Upapandavas were the five sons of Pandava and Draupadi (daughter of King Drupada of Panchala). Their names were Prativindhya (from Yudhishthira), Sutasoma (from Bheema), Shrutakarma (from Arjuna), Satanika (from Nakula) and Shrutasena (from Sahadeva).

== See also ==
- Uttara Kurus
- Janapada
- Mahajanapada
- Mahabharata
- Kurukshetra War
- Krishna
- Painted Grey Ware culture

== Sources ==
- Pletcher, Kenneth (2010). The History of India. The Rosen Publishing Group. ISBN 9781615301225.
- Raychaudhuri, Hemchandra (1953). Political History of Ancient India: From the Accession of Parikshit to the Extinction of Gupta Dynasty. University of Calcutta.
