= Bhishma (1962 film) =

1962 film

- Theatrical release poster
- Directed by: B. A. Subba Rao
- Based on: Life of Bhishma
- Produced by: B. A. Subba Rao
- Starring: N. T. Rama Rao; Anjali Devi
- Cinematography: M. A. Rehman
- Edited by: K. A. Marthand
- Music by: S. Rajeswara Rao
- Production company: B. A. S. Productions
- Release date: 19 April 1962
- Running time: 165 minutes
- Country: India
- Language: Telugu

Bhishma is a 1962 Indian Telugu-language Hindu mythological film, based on the life of Bhishma from the epic Mahabharata, produced and directed by B. A. Subba Rao. It stars N. T. Rama Rao and Anjali Devi, with music composed by S. Rajeswara Rao.

== Cast ==
- N. T. Rama Rao as Bhishma
  - Master Nagaraju as young Bhishma
- Anjali Devi as Amba / Shikhandi
- Kanta Rao as Salwa
- Relangi as Narada Maharshi
- Haranath as Lord Krishna
- Shobhan Babu as Arjuna
- Gummadi as Karna
- Nagabhushanam as Parashurama
- Dhulipala as Duryodhana
- Satyanarayana as Lord Shiva
- Prabhakar Reddy as Shantanu
- Vangara as Rajaguru Madhava
- C. S. R as Shalya
- Peketi Sivaram as Vichitravirya
- Malladi as Drupada
- A. V. Subba Rao as Dasaraju
- A. V. Subba Rao Jr as Drona
- Jagga Rao as Dushasana
- Suryakantham as Dasaraju's wife
- G. Varalakshmi as Kunti
- Sujatha as Satyavati
- Anuradha as Ganga
- Meena Kumari as Hemangini
- Susheela as Ambika
- Malleswari as Ambalika
- Nirmalamma as Drupada's wife

== Soundtrack ==
Bhishma

Film score by S. Rajeswara Rao
- Released: 1962
- Genre: Soundtrack
- Producer: S. Rajeswara Rao

Music composed by S. Rajeswara Rao. Lyrics were written by Aarudhra.

S. No	Song title	Singers	length
1	Brahmadevasutha Bhagyavidhaata	Ghantasala, P. Susheela	
2	Teliyagalere Nee Leelalu	Ghantasala	
3	Jo Jo Jola Garala Bala	P. Susheela	
4	Hailo Hailessa	K. Jamuna Rani	
5	Naa Janmambu	Ghantasala	
6	Manasuloni Korika	P. B. Srinivas, P. Susheela	
7	Mahadeva Sambho	P. Susheela	
8	Bhavi Bharatha Katha	Aakula	
9	Durasache Duryodhanadulu	Ghantasala	
10	Madhava Madhava	P. Susheela, S. Janaki	
11	Bava Karunude	P. B. Srinivas	
12	Samaramatanchu	P. B. Srinivas	
13	Emanuvaru	Madhavapeddi Satyam	
14	Poru Nashtambu	P. B. Srinivas	
15	Nannu Nevvaniga	P. B. Srinivas	
16	Chesina Karmaye	P. B. Srinivas	
17	Kuppinchi Yegasina	Ghantasala	
18	Pandavulunu Kunthi	P. B. Srinivas	
19	Deva Deva	Ghantasala	
20	Namo Tyaga Charitha	Pithapuram	
