= Vyasa =

Ancient Indian Sage

Maharishi Vyasa
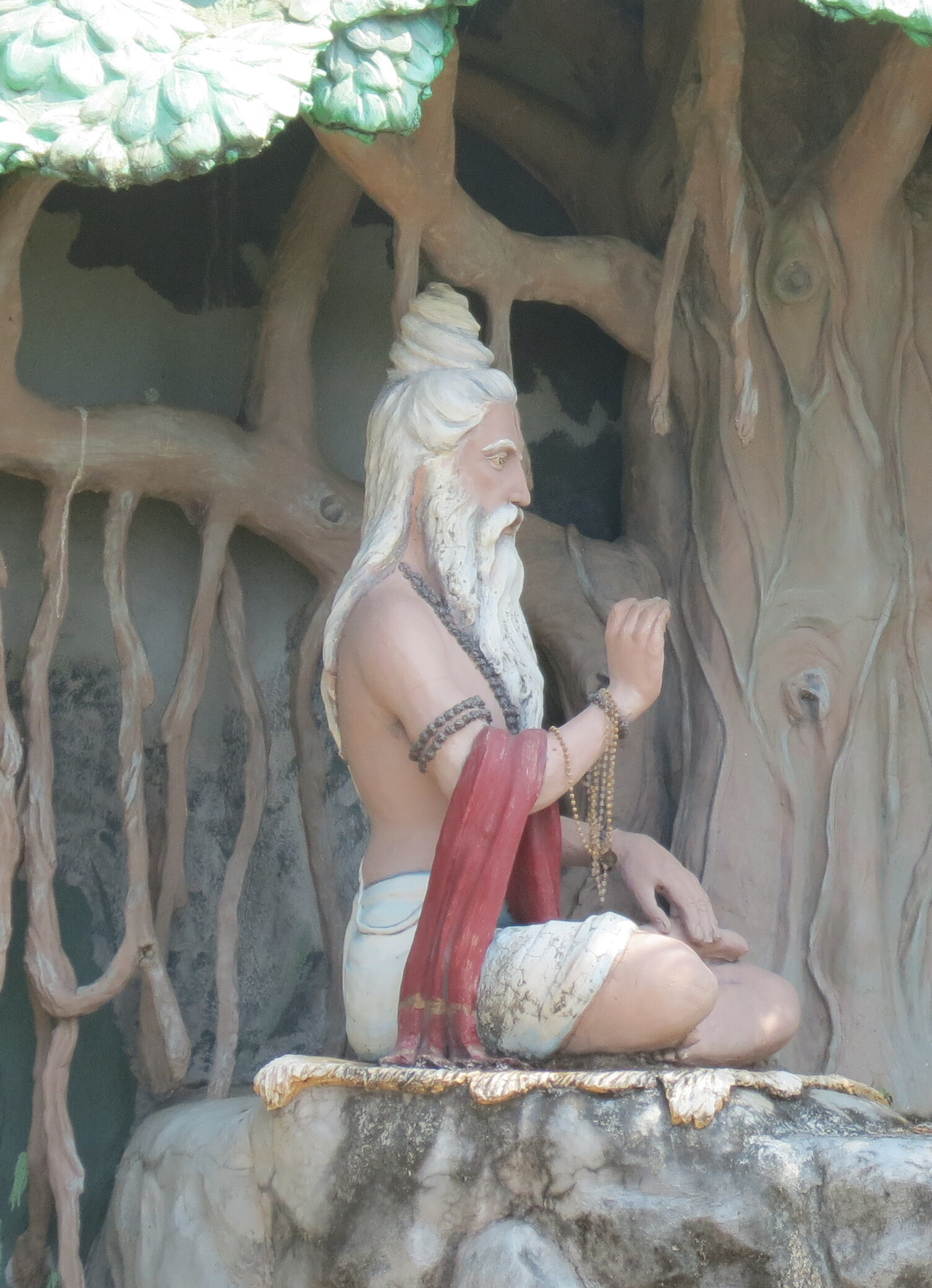
- A sculpture of Vyasa at Murudeshwar
- Title: Maharishi, Vyasadeva, Vedavyasa

Personal life
- Spouse: Vatikā (only in few Puranas)
- Children: Shuka (son) The following were fathered by Vyasa through the Niyoga practice, on behalf of his half-brother Vichitravirya: Dhritarashtra (son; from Ambika); Pandu (son; from Ambalika); Vidura (son; from a Shudra maid)
- Parents: Parashara (father); Satyavati (mother)
- Notable works: Vedas; Mahabharata; Puranas; Brahma Sutras
- Relatives: Chitrāngada; Vichitravirya; (half-brothers)
- Honours: Guru Purnima

Religious life
- Religion: Hinduism
- Institute: Vyasa Peetha

Religious career
- Disciples: Shuka; Jaimini; Vaishampayana; Paila; Sumantu

Vyasa (/ˈvjɑːsə/; Sanskrit: व्यास, lit. 'compiler, arranger', IAST: Vyāsa) is a rishi (sage) with a prominent role in most Hindu traditions. He is also known as Veda Vyasa (Sanskrit: वेदव्यास, lit. 'the one who classified the Vedas', IAST: Vedavyāsa) or Krishna Dvaipayana (Sanskrit: कृष्णद्वैपायन, IAST: Kṛṣṇadvaipāyana). Traditionally regarded as the author of the epic Mahābhārata, Vyasa also plays a prominent role as a character. He is also regarded by the Hindu traditions to be the compiler of the mantras of the Vedas into four texts, as well as the author of the eighteen Purāṇas and the Brahma Sutras.

Vyasa is regarded by many Hindus as a partial incarnation (Sanskrit: अंशावतार, IAST: Aṃśāvatāra) of Vishnu. He is one of the immortals called the Chiranjivis, held by adherents to still be alive in the current age known as the Kali Yuga.

== Name ==
"Vyasa" (Vyāsa) means "compiler" or "arranger and also "separation" or "division." Other meanings include "split," "differentiate," or "describe." It is also a title given to "a holy sage or a pious learned man" and is applied to "persons distinguished for their writings."

Vyasa is commonly known as "Veda Vyasa" (Sanskrit: वेदव्यास, Vedavyāsa) as he divided the single, eternal Veda into four separate books—Rigveda, Samaveda, Yajurveda and Atharvaveda. In the Mahabharata, Vyasa is also called Krishna, which refers to his dark complexion (krishna), and as Dvaipāyana, as his birthplace was on an island (dvaipayana).

== Divider of the Veda ==
Hindus traditionally hold that Vyasa subcategorized the primordial single Veda to produce four parts as a canonical collection. Hence he was called Veda-Vyasa, or "Splitter of the Vedas", the splitting being a feat that allowed people to understand the divine knowledge of the Veda.

The Vishnu Puraṇa elaborates on the role of Vyasa in the Hindu chronology. The Hindu view of the universe is that of a cyclic phenomenon that comes into existence and dissolves repeatedly. Each kalpa cycle is presided over by 14 Manus, one for each manvantara, and each manvantara has 71 yuga cycles, each with four yuga ages of declining virtues. The Dvapara Yuga is the third yuga. The Vishṇu Puraṇa (Book 3, Ch 3) says:

In every third world age (Dvāpara), Vishnu, in the person of Vyāsa, in order to promote the good of mankind, divides the Veda, which is properly but one, into many portions. Observing the limited perseverance, energy and application of mortals, he makes the Veda fourfold, to adapt it to their capacities; and the bodily form which he assumes, in order to effect that classification, is known by the name of Vedavyāsa. Of the different Vyāsas in the present Manvantara and the branches which they have taught, you shall have an account. Twenty-eight times have the Vedas been arranged by the great Rishis in the Vaivasvata Manvantara [...] and consequently, eight and twenty Vyāsa's have passed away; by whom, in the respective periods, the Veda has been divided into four. The first... distribution was made by Svayambhū (Brahmā) himself; in the second, the arranger of the Veda (Vyasa) was Prajāpati [...] (and so on up to twenty-eight).

According to the Vishṇu Purāṇa, Aśwatthāmā, the son of Droṇa, will become the next sage (Vyasa) and will divide the Veda in 29th Mahā Yuga of 7th Manvantara.

== Attributed texts ==
=== The Mahabharata ===
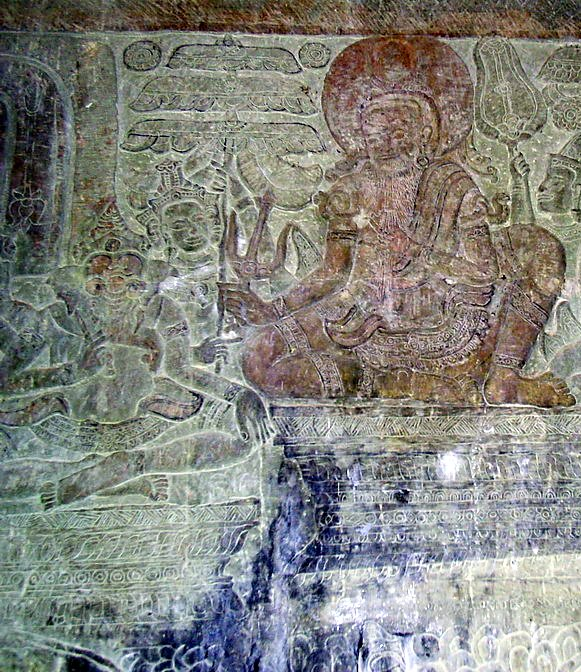
Vyasa narrating the Mahabharata to Ganesha, his scribe – Angkor Wat

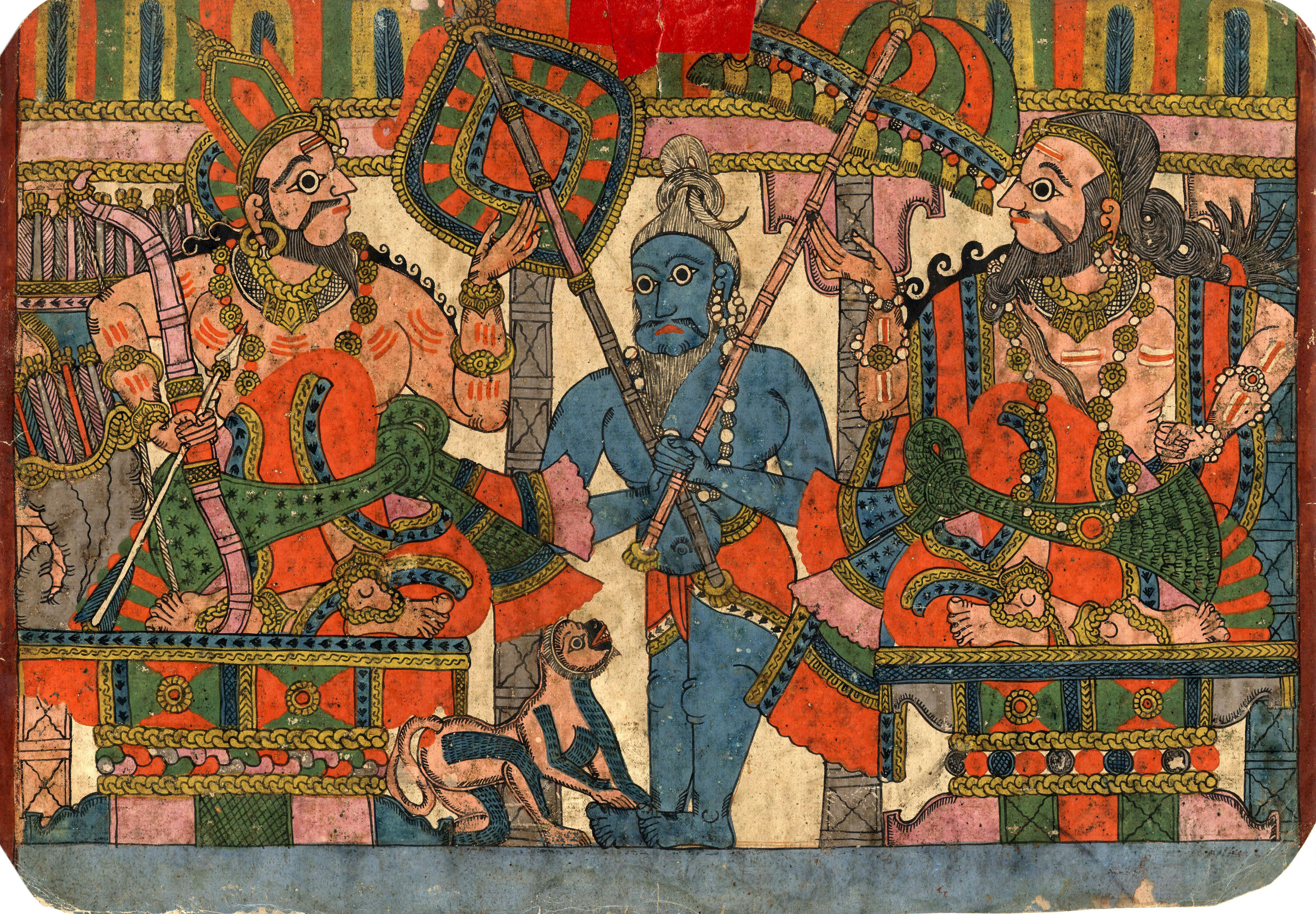
Painting depicting Vyasa and the king Janamejaya.

Vyasa is regarded as the author of the Mahabharata, a major epic of Hindu literature. The first section of the Mahābhārata states that Gaṇesha wrote the text to Vyasa's dictation, (Note: It is believed that Vyasa asks Ganesha to assist him in writing the text. Ganesha imposes a precondition that he would do so only if Vyasa would narrate the story without a pause. Vyasa set a counter-condition that Ganesha understands the verses first before transcribing them. Thus Vyasa narrated the entire Mahābhārata.) but this is regarded by scholars as a later interpolation to the epic and this part of the story is also excluded from the "Critical Edition" of the Mahābhārata.

The Mahābhārata centers on a succession conflict between two branches of the Kuru royal house, the five Pāṇḍava brothers, who are the eventual victors and their cousins, the hundred Kaurava brothers. Vyasa is connected to both sides of this conflict by birth as well as by authorship. At Satyavati's request Vyasa fathered Pāṇḍu and Dhṛtarāṣṭra through the practice of Niyoga, after Vichitravīrya, his younger half brother, died without an heir. Pāṇḍu later became the nominal father of the five Pāṇḍavas, who are described in the epic as having been conceived by various gods. Dhṛtarāṣṭra became the father of the hundred Kauravas. Some scholars have noted that, since Gāndhārī's sons are said to have been born from a boon granted by Vyasa, Vyasa may be regarded as their biological father as well. Because of this the Mahābhārata's central conflict has been described as a struggle between Vyasa's own descendants.

It was after composing the Mahābhārata and compiling the Vedas that Vyasa came to be known by that title (meaning "compiler" or "arranger") that superseded his birth names, Kṛṣṇa and Dvaipāyana. the name of his epic subsequently informed the official Hindi-language name of India Bhārata Gaṇarājya, as used in Indian constitution.

Vyasa's Jaya (literally, "victory"), the core of the Mahābhārata, is a dialogue between Dhṛtarāṣṭra (the Kuru king and the father of the Kauravas, who opposed the Pāṇḍavas in the Kurukshetra War) and Sanjaya, his adviser and charioteer. Sanjaya narrates the particulars of the Kurukshetra War, fought over eighteen days, chronologically. Dhṛtarāṣṭra at times asks questions and expresses doubts, sometimes lamenting, fearing the destruction the war would bring on his family, friends and kin.

The Bhagavad Gita is contained in the Bhishma Parva, which comprises chapters 23–40 of book 6 of the Mahābhārata. The Gita, dated to the second half of the first millennium BCE, is itself one of the most influential philosophico-religious dialogues, producing numerous commentaries and attracting a global audience. Like the "Jaya", it is also a dialogue, in which Pāṇḍavas prince Arjuna's hesitation to attack his cousins is counseled from 'the perspective of the gods' by his charioteer, Krishna, who is revealed to be an avatar of Vishnu. In 1981, Larson stated that "a complete listing of Gita translations and a related secondary bibliography would be nearly endless". The Bhagavad Gita has been highly praised, not only by prominent Indians including Mahatma Gandhi and Sarvepalli Radhakrishnan, but also by Aldous Huxley, Henry David Thoreau, J. Robert Oppenheimer, Ralph Waldo Emerson, Carl Jung, Hermann Hesse, and Bülent Ecevit.

=== Puranas ===
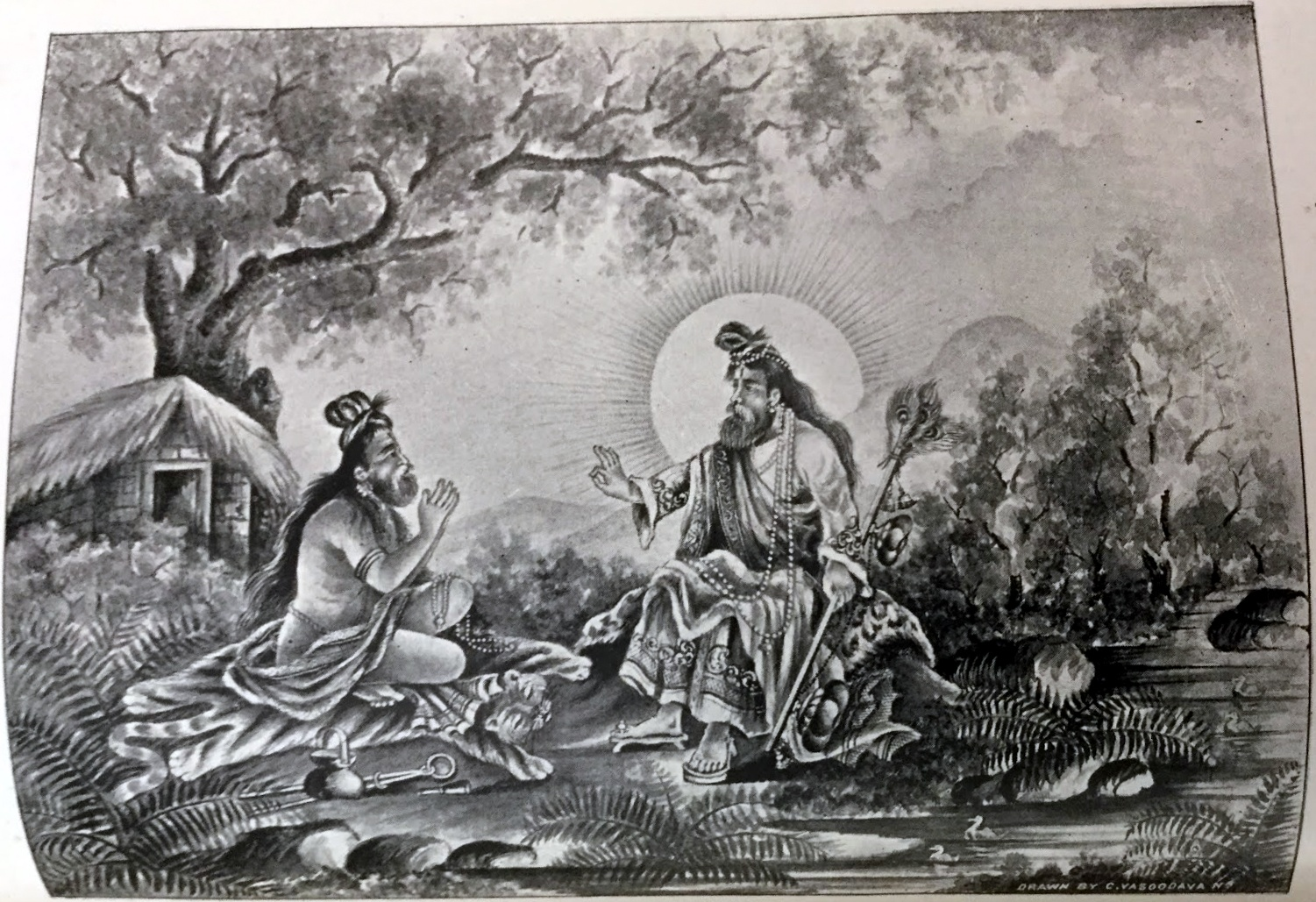
Narada meets Vyasa

Vyasa is also credited with the writing of the eighteen major Purāṇas, which are works of Indian literature that cover an encyclopedic range of topics covering various scriptures.

=== Brahma Sutras ===
The Brahma Sutras, one of the foundational texts of Vedanta, is written by Bādarāyaṇa also called Veda Vyasa, "one who arranges".

== Role in the Mahabharata ==
=== Birth ===
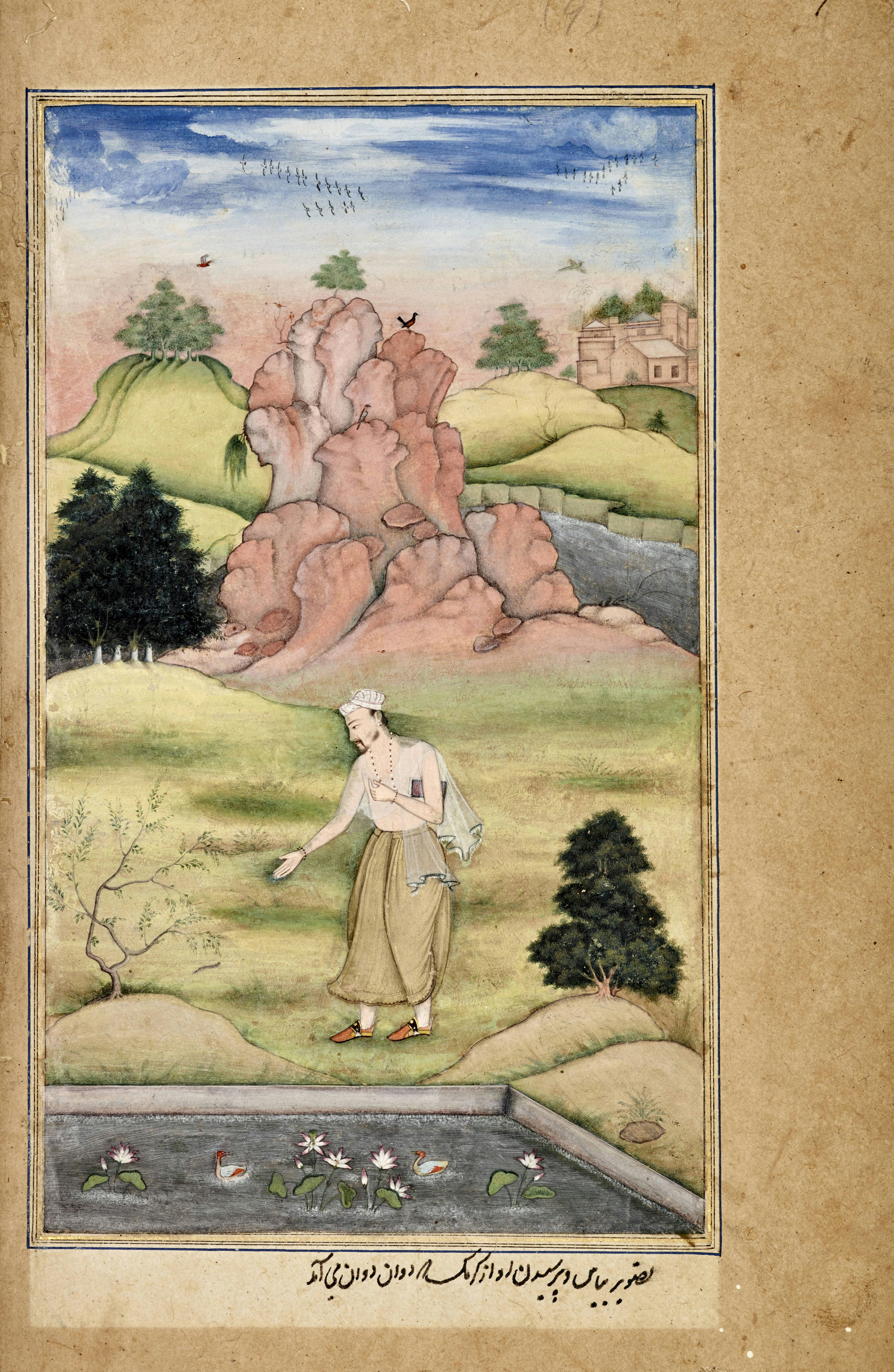
Vyasa depicted in the Razmnama (c.1598)

According to the Mahabharata, Vyasa's mother, Satyavati, was raised as the daughter of a fisherman, belonging to a clan that ferried people across the river Yamuna. She used to help her father in this task. It was during one such ferrying that she encountered the sage Parasara. As he boarded her boat, he was captivated by her beauty. Overcome with desire, he approached her, but she, recognizing his intent, pleaded to preserve her chastity. However, Parasara used his divine powers to create a fog around the boat and transformed her natural scent into the fragrance of musk. He also conjured an island in the middle of the river, where he consummated his union with her. After this, he assured her that she would remain a virgin despite giving birth. He prophesied that the son born to her would be an extraordinary being—a partial incarnation of Vishnu, a man of immense wisdom, and a revered teacher who would divide the Vedas and be honored across the three worlds.

Following this, Parasara performed his ablutions in the Yamuna and departed. Satyavati's pregnancy ended immediately, and she gave birth to a radiant and handsome boy on the island. As soon as he was born, the child matured into an ascetic form, exuding spiritual radiance. He reassured his mother that she need not worry about him and that he was leaving to undertake penance. He further promised that whenever she faced difficulties, she could think of him, and he would appear by her side. Having said this, he departed, embarking on the path of a hermit. He was named Krishna Dvaipayana, in reference to his dark complexion.

Satyavati kept this incident a secret, not telling even King Shantanu whom she later married.

=== Continuing the Kuru Dynasty ===
Shantanu and Satyavati had two sons, named Chitrāngada and Vichitravirya. Both of them died early without leaving an heir, but Vichitravirya had two wives – Ambika and Ambalika. A widowed Satyavati initially asked her stepson, Bhishma, to marry both the queens, but he refused, citing his vow of celibacy. Satyavati revealed her secret past and requested him to bring her firstborn, Vyasa, to impregnate the widows under a tradition called Niyoga.

Sage Vyasa was unkempt because of months of meditation in the forest. Hence upon seeing him, Ambika who was rather scared shut her eyes, resulting in their child, Dhṛtarāṣṭra, being born blind. The other queen, Ambalika, turned pale upon meeting Vyasa, which resulted in their child, Pāṇḍu, being born pale. Alarmed, Satyavati requested that Vyasa meet Ambika again and grant her another son. Ambika instead sent her maid to meet Vyasa. The duty-bound maid was calm and composed; she had a healthy child who was later named Vidura.

When the children of Sage Vyasa and step-sons of Vichitravirya grew up, Bhishma got them married to different women. Dhṛtarāṣṭra was married to Gāndhāri, princess of Gandhara. Pāṇḍu married Kunti and Madri. Pāṇḍu left the kingdom, leaving Dhṛtarāṣṭra as the acting king. Gāndhāri, during her adolescence, received a boon to have a hundred children but her pregnancy lasted a long time. After two years of pregnancy, Gandhari aborted her developing fetus, giving birth to a hard mass that looked like an iron ball. Vyasa came to the kingdom and using his knowledge, instructed that the mass be divided into one hundred and one pieces and placed them into pots for incubation. After a year, 101 babies were born. Meanwhile, Pāṇḍu's wives, Kunti and Mādri, had three and two sons respectively.

After the death of Pāṇḍu, Vyasa consoled Kunti and the young Pāṇḍavas, providing them with counsel in their time of bereavement. Vyāsa, feeling sorrow for his mother's fate, asked her to leave the kingdom and come with him to live a peaceful life. Satyavati, along with her two daughters-in-law, went to the forest.

=== Influence on the political affairs of the Kuru Kingdom ===
Vyasa is a pivotal figure in the Mahabharata, serving as the spiritual and moral guide for both the Kauravas and the Pāṇḍavas. While his primary residence remained his hermitage, his influence extended deeply into the affairs of Hastinapura (the capital of the Kuru kingdom). He was actively engaged in shaping events, offering counsel and intervention at crucial moments.

His influence extended to the broader political and social developments of the time. He played a decisive role in facilitating Draupadi's marriage to the five Pāṇḍavas, thereby shaping an alliance that had significant implications in the unfolding events. His wisdom was frequently sought in matters of governance, and he was a regular presence in Yudhishthira's court. Under his guidance, the Pāṇḍavas undertook regional conquests, expanding their influence. Vyasa also played a central role in the Rajasuya sacrifice performed by Yudhishthira, overseeing its arrangements and predicting the future course of events. Upon the conclusion of the ceremony, he performed the anointment of Yudhishthira.

As hostilities between the Kauravas and the Pāṇḍavas escalated, Vyasa made multiple attempts to prevent conflict. He advised Dhṛtarāṣṭra to restrain Duryodhana from unjust actions, warning of the potential consequences. During the Pāṇḍavas’ exile, he visited them in the forest and imparted teachings to Yudhishthira on various philosophical and strategic matters. Prior to the Kurukshetra war, he granted Sanjaya divine vision, enabling him to narrate the battle's progress to Dhṛtarāṣṭra. During the war, he provided guidance and consolation to Yudhishthira and Arjuna, both of whom were deeply affected by the destruction around them.

Following the war, Vyasa continued to be actively involved in the political and moral reconstruction of the kingdom. He intervened to prevent Gandhari from cursing the Pāṇḍavas in her grief and provided counsel to Yudhishthira on governance and statecraft. When Yudhishthira, overwhelmed by remorse, considered renouncing his throne, Vyasa dissuaded him, urging him to fulfill his responsibilities. He played a crucial role in post-war reconciliation, using his spiritual power to bring forth the spirits of those who had perished, allowing Dhṛtarāṣṭra and others to witness them. He also guided the widows of fallen warriors, instructing them on traditional rites.

== Other accounts ==
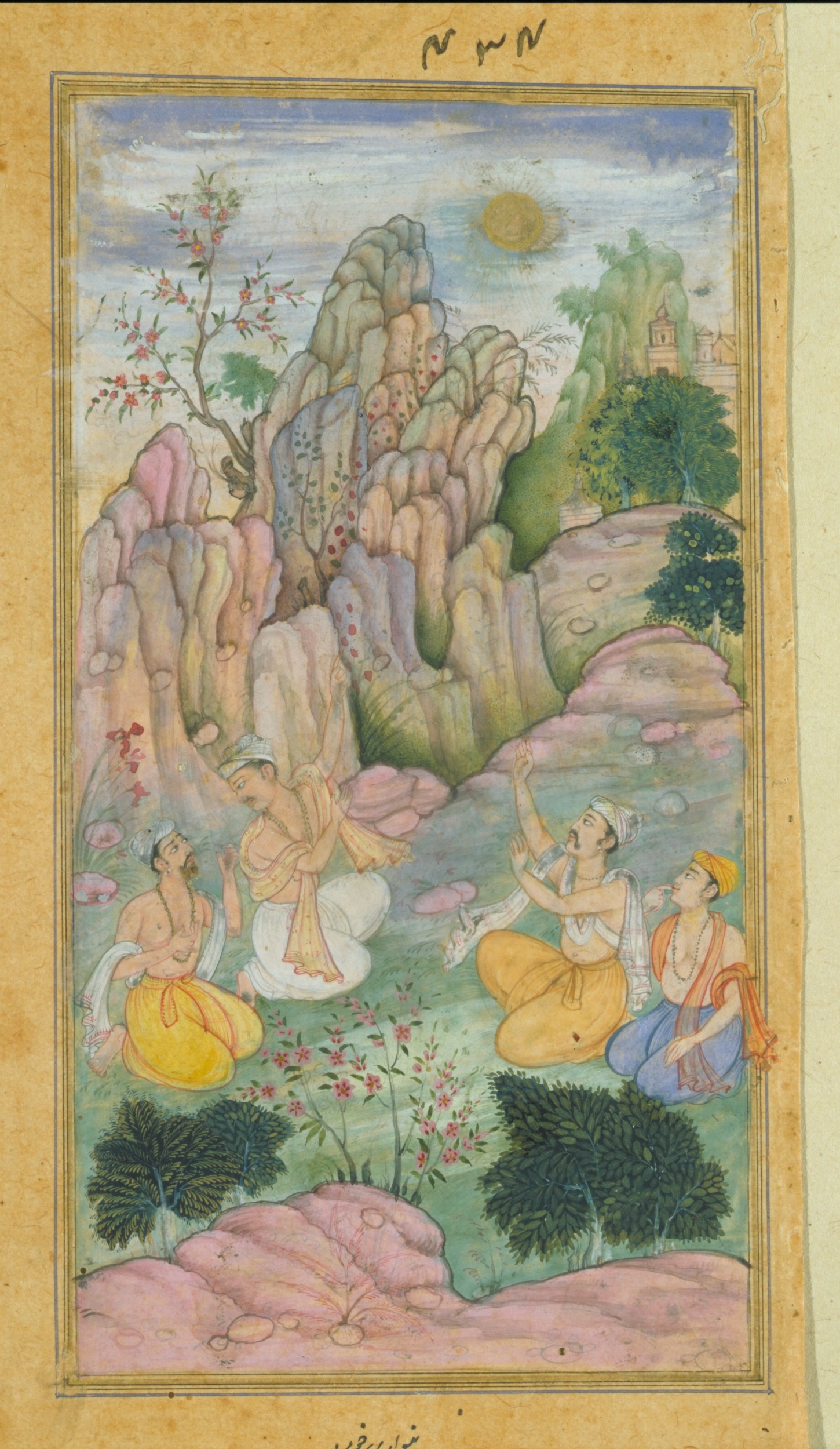
Vyasa with his disciples in the Razmnama (c.1598)

Vyasa had a son named Shuka, who was his spiritual successor and heir. (Note: Later, Vyasa became the surrogate father of Kuru princes — Pandu and Dhritrashtra.) According to the Skanda Purana, Vyasa married Vatikā, also known as Pinjalā, who was the daughter of a sage named Jābāli. Their union produced his heir, who repeated everything that he heard, thus receiving the name Shuka (lit. Parrot). Other texts, including the Devi Bhagavata Purana, also narrate the birth of Shuka but with significant differences. In one account, Vyasa, who desired an heir, was aroused when an apsara (celestial nymph) named Ghritachi flew in front of him in the form of a beautiful parrot. His semen fell on some sticks and a son developed. In this version as well, he was named Shuka due to the role of a parrot. Shuka appears occasionally in the story as a spiritual guide to the young Kuru princes.

Aside from his son, Vyasa had four other disciples—Paila, Jaimini, Vaishampayana and Sumantu. Each one of them was given the responsibility to spread one of the four Vedas. Paila was assigned the Rigveda, Jaimini the Samaveda, Vaishampayana the Yajurveda and Sumantu the Atharvaveda.

Vyasa is believed to have lived on the banks of Gangā in modern-day Uttarākhaṇd. The site was also considered the ritual home of the sage Vashishta, and later of the Pāṇḍavas.

Vyasa is also mentioned in the Śankara Digvijaya. He confronts Ādi Shankara, who has written a commentary on the Brahma Sutras, in the form of an old Brahmana, and asks for an explanation of the first Sutra. This develops into a debate between Shankara and Vyasa, which lasts for eight days. Recognizing the old Brahmana to be Vyasa, Shankara makes obeisance and sings a hymn in his praise. Thereupon, Vyasa inspects and approves Shankara's commentary on the Brahma Sutras. Adi Shankara, who was supposed to die at the end of his sixteenth year, expresses his desire to leave his body in the presence of Vyasa. Vyasa dissuades him and blesses him so that he may live for another sixteen years to complete his work.

== Festival ==
The festival of Guru Purnima is dedicated to Vyasa. It is also known as Vyasa Purnima, the day believed to be both of his birth and when he divided the Vedas.

== In Buddhism ==
In Buddhist literature, Vyasa appears under the Pali name, Kaṇhadīpāyana (Sanskrit: Kṛṣṇa Dvaipāyana), across several stories in the Jātaka collection of the Pali Canon, where he is variously portrayed as a previous birth of Gautama Buddha or as a very wise and powerful ascetic sage possessing psychic powers.

- Kaṇhadīpāyana Jātaka (Jātaka No. 444): In this tale, Kaṇhadīpāyana is identified as a previous incarnation of the Bodhisatta. He is a wealthy Brahmin of Kosambi who renounces his fortune to live as an ascetic alongside his friend Maṇḍabya.

Sage Mandavya is wrongfully impaled

Rather than attributing his name to a dark complexion and island birth as in the Mahabharata, the narrative offers a retroactive folk etymology: originally fair-skinned and named Dīpāyana, he keeps vigil beneath the impaled Māṇḍavya, and drops of blood falling onto his golden skin dry into black spots, earning him the epithet Kaṇha ("Black"). He later saves a snake-bitten child by performing an Act of Truth (saccakiriyā), candidly confessing that he had practiced the ascetic life reluctantly for fifty years.

- Ghaṭa Jātaka (Jātaka No. 454): Parallel to the Mausala Parva of the Mahābhārata, Kaṇhadīpāyana appears as a clairvoyant seer, associated Vāsudeva and the ten Andhakaveṇhu princes of Dvāravatī. When the princes' sons attempt to mock his divine insight by dressing a youth up as a pregnant woman, Kaṇhadīpāyana foresees that the youth will expel a knot of acacia wood in seven days that will destroy their entire clan, and that he himself will die that very day; the youths immediately slay him, though his prophecy comes to pass.
- Bhūridatta Jātaka (Jātaka No. 543): Kaṇhadīpāyana is mentioned alongside other ancient sages (such as Aggattha and Aṅgīrasa) as a renowned seer of antiquity.

== In Sikhism ==
In Brahm Avtar (1698 CE), one of the compositions in Dasam Granth, Guru Gobind Singh mentions Vyasa as an avatar of Brahma. He is considered the fifth incarnation of Brahma. Guru Gobind Singh wrote a brief account of Vyasa's compositions about great kings—Manu, Prithu, Bharath, Jujat, Ben, Mandata, Dilip, Raghu Raj and Aj—and attributed to him the store of Vedic learning.

== Ancestry ==
Ancestors of Vyasa

8. Vasishtha
4. Shakti
9. Arundhati
2. Parashara
5. Adrushyanti
1. Vyasa
6. Uparichara Vasu
3. Satyavati
7. Adrika

== See also ==
- Chiranjivi
- Guru Gita
- Gnana Saraswati Temple, Basar
- Parashara
- Vedic mythology
- Mahabharata

== Sources ==
- Dalal, Roshen (6 January 2019). The 108 Upanishads: An Introduction. Penguin Random House India Private Limited. ISBN 978-93-5305-377-2.
- Maas, Philipp A. (2006), Samādhipāda. Das erste Kapitel des Pātañjalayogaśāstra zum ersten Mal kritisch ediert. (Samādhipāda. The First Chapter of the Pātañjalayogaśās-tra for the First Time Critically Edited)., Aachen: Shaker
- Pattanaik, Devdutt (1 September 2000). The Goddess in India: The Five Faces of the Eternal Feminine. Simon and Schuster. ISBN 978-1-59477-537-6.
- Sullivan, Bruce M. (1999). Seer of the Fifth Veda: Kr̥ṣṇa Dvaipāyana Vyāsa in the Mahābhārata. Motilal Banarsidass Publ. ISBN 978-81-208-1676-3.
