= Pandu =

Kuru King and father of the Pandavas in the epic Mahabharata

- Mahabharata character
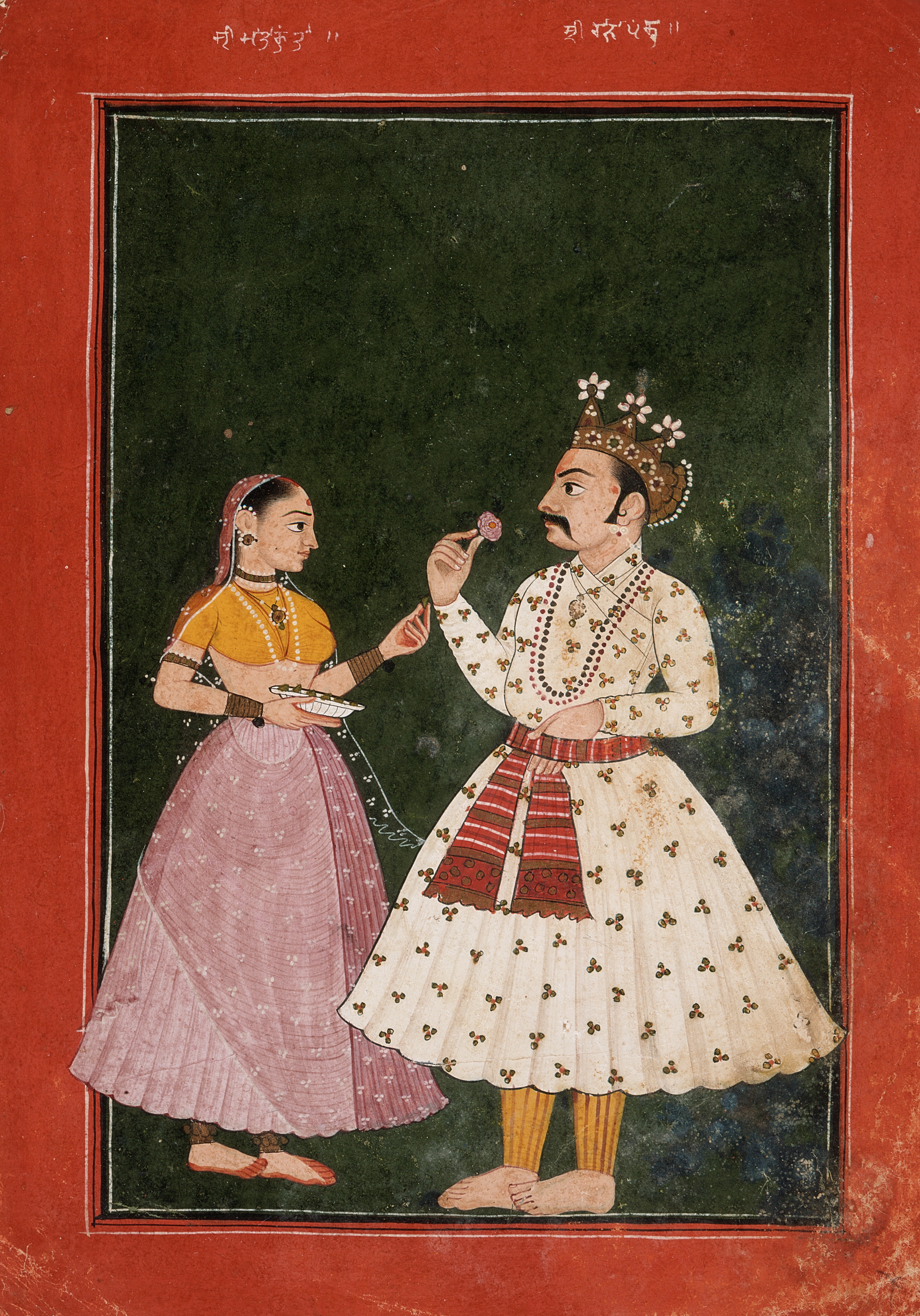
- A late 17th-century painting of Pandu (right) and Kunti from Kashmir

Information
- Title: King of Kuru Kingdom
- Weapon: Bow and arrow
- Family: Vyasa (biological father); Ambalika (mother); Vichitravirya (legal father); Vidura (half-brother); Dhritarashtra (half-brother)
- Spouses: Kunti; Madri
- Children: The following were sired by different deities and were acknowledged as Pandu's sons From Kunti: Yudhishthira by Yama; Bhima by Vayu; Arjuna by Indra; From Madri: Nakula; Sahadeva by Ashvins
- Home: Kuru Kingdom
- Dynasty: Chandravamsha

Pandu (Sanskrit: पाण्डु, romanized: Pāṇḍu, lit. 'pale') is a character in the ancient Hindu epic Mahabharata. He was the king of the Kuru kingdom, with his capital at Hastinapura. He was the legal father of the five Pandavas, who are the central characters of the epic.

Pandu was born pale, to Vichitravirya's second wife, Ambalika. Pandu married Kunti and Madri. Following sage Kindama's curse, his sons were born through the boons bestowed upon his wives Kunti and Madri by a number of deities.

== Birth ==
When Vichitravirya died due to sickness, Bhishma was unable to ascend the throne because of his vow, and Bahlika's line was unwilling to leave the Bahlika kingdom. There ensued a succession crisis in Hastinapura. Satyavati then invited her son Vyasa to impregnate the queens Ambika and Ambalika under the Niyoga practice. When Vyasa approached Ambalika, she was frightened by his scary appearance, and she had become pale in disgust; hence, her son was born pale. Thus, Pandu's name means pale.

== Early life ==
Pandu along with his elder half-brother Dhritarashtra, was trained in the military arts by Bhishma and Kripacharya. Bhishma also taught Pandu in the fields of archery, politics, administration and religion. He was an excellent archer and Maharathi (warrior).

== Reign ==
When it came time to nominate an heir, Vidura suggested that Pandu would be a better fit because he was not blind, unlike Dhritarashtra. Pandu became the successor to his kingdom and was crowned King of the Kuru kingdom, with capital at Hastinapura. Pandu conquered the territories of the Sindhu kingdom, Kashi, Anga, Trigarta kingdom, Kalinga, Magadha, etc., and thus re-established their supremacy over all the kings and increased the span of his empire.

== Marriage ==
Pandu was married to Kunti, the adoptive daughter of Kuntibhoja and the daughter of Shurasena (father of Vasudeva and grandfather of Krishna). His second wife was the princess of the Madra kingdom Madri. The marriage was proposed by Bhishma.

== Kindama's curse ==
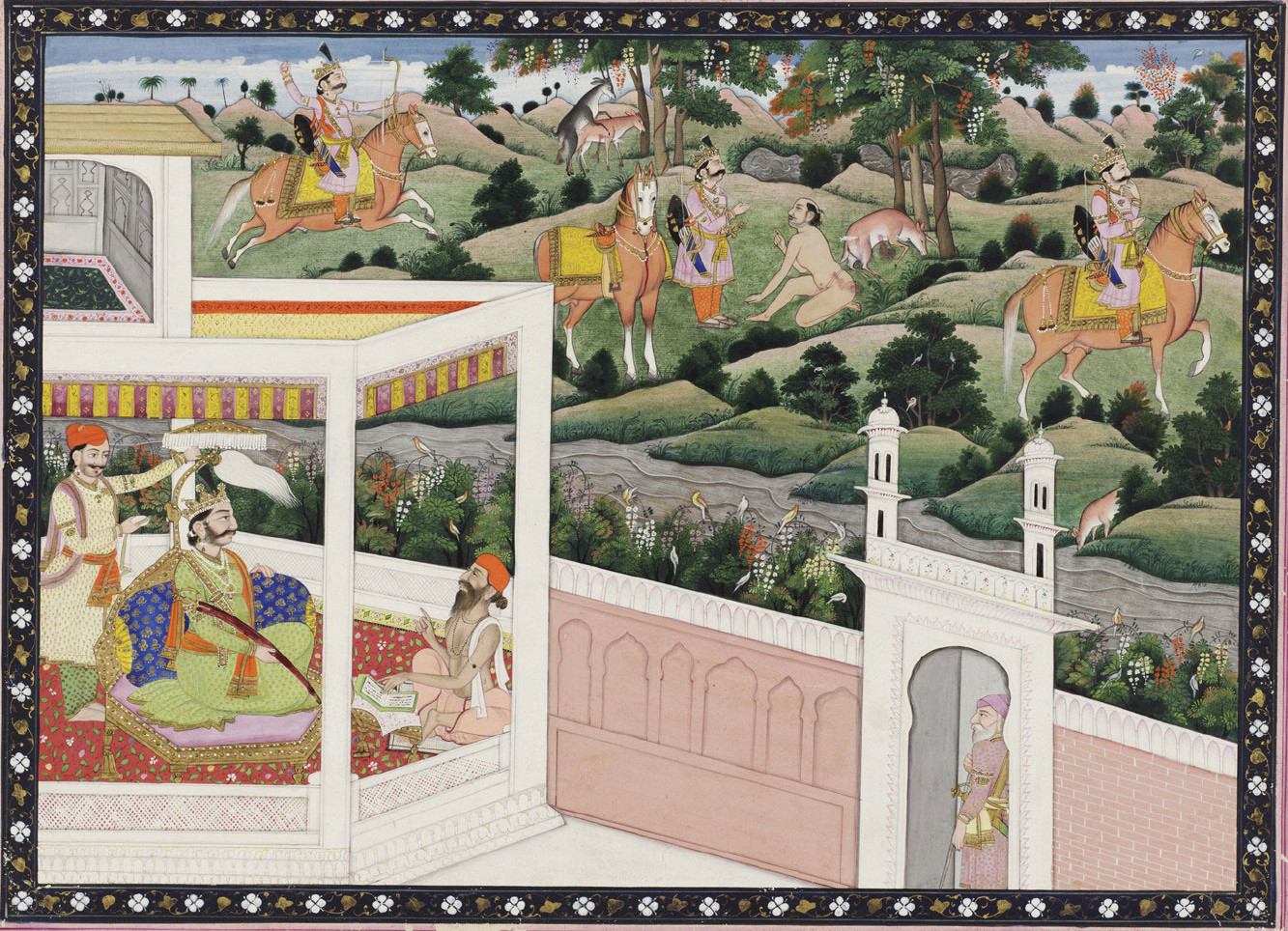
Pandu shoots Kindama, who is disguised as a deer.

While hunting in a forest (looking from a distance, his vision partially obscured by plants and trees), Pandu saw a couple of deer in the process of coitus, and shot arrows at them; he later discovered that it was the sage Kindama and his wife who were having sex in the form of deer. The dying sage placed a curse on Pandu, for not only had he killed them in the midst of lovemaking, but was not remorseful for his actions either. King Pandu argued with sage Kindama by misquoting sage Agastya's ruling on the right of Kshatriyas' on hunting. Sage Kindama then cursed Pandu such that were he to approach his wives with the intent of having sex, he would die.

== Exile and Pandavas birth ==
Upset and seeking to repent his deed, Pandu handed his kingdom to Dhritarashtra and left for exile in the forest. There, he started to lead the life of an ascetic with his wives.

=== Birth of Pandu's foster sons ===
As a consequence of Kindama's curse, Pandu became incapable of fathering any children. One day, Pandu was regaling the story of his birth and his wish of becoming a father to his first wife, Kunti. Kunti told him about the child-bearing mantra taught to her by the sage Durvasa. Pandu was overjoyed and told Kunti to use it to gain sons from suitable deities. He wanted his son to be righteous, and so he suggested Dharmaraja, the deity of death and righteousness. Kunti chanted her mantra and the deity granted her Yudhishthira. Later, Pandu expressed his desire for a powerful son. This time, Kunti invoked Vayu and Bhima was born. Pandu suggested Kunti to invoke Indra and a valiant son, Arjuna, was born. Pandu felt bad for Madri's childlessness, and thus requested Kunti to share her mantra with her. Heeding his request, Kunti revealed her mantra once to Pandu's younger wife. Madri invoked the Ashvin twins, and then gave birth to Nakula and Sahadeva.

== Death ==
One day, Pandu forgot about the curse and was suddenly filled with lust for Madri. Despite her pleas, he proceeded to engage in sexual intercourse with her. After the act, his curse was fulfilled and he died. His body was cremated within the forest. Attributing her husband's death to herself and swept by remorse, Madri took her own life after handing her children over to Kunti.

== See also ==
- Pandava
- The Pandeism of Godfrey Higgins
- Historicity of the Mahabharata
