= Pratipa =

Kuru King

- Texts: Mahabharata, Puranas

Genealogy
- Parents: Bhimasena (according to Mahabharata) or Dilipa (according to puranas) (father); Kaikeyi (mother)
- Spouse: Sunandā
- Children: Shantanu, Devāpi, and Bālhīka
- Dynasty: Chandravamsha

Pratipa (Sanskrit: प्रतीप, romanized: Pratīpa) is a legendary king in Hinduism. He is the king of Hastinapura and a member of the Lunar dynasty. He is the father of Shantanu and the grandfather of Bhishma, Chitrangada, and Vichitravirya. The king is mentioned in the Hindu epic Mahabharata.

== Legend ==
=== Origin ===
According to the Puranas, Pratipa was the great-grandson of Bhimasena and son of Dilipa. However, according to the Mahabharata, he was the son of king Bhimasena and princess Sukumari of the Kaikeyas. He married Sunanda of the Shibis, on whom he begot Devapi, Bahlika, and Shantanu.

=== Meeting with Ganga ===
Once, when King Pratipa was meditating on the banks of the river Ganges and chanting prayers to Surya, the goddess Ganga appeared after receiving a curse from Brahma at Satyaloka. Ganga came and sat on the right lap of Pratipa, due to which his meditation broke. She requested Pratipa to marry her. Pratipa said that since Ganga had sat on his right lap, which was meant for a daughter or daughter-in-law, she would have to be till Pratipa begot a son. Therefore, he proposed to Ganga that she may marry his son and become his daughter-in-law. At this time, Pratipa and his wife were still without children, but after they had performed some acts of austerity, they begat three sons, Devapi, Bahlika & Shantanu. The youngest son Shantanu inherited the Kingdom of Hastinapura. Shantanu later married Ganga and became the father of Devavrata, better known as Bhishma.

== Literature ==
J.A.B. van Buitenen, Mahabharata Book 1, Chicago 1973, pp. 214–220
