= Amba (Mahabharata) =

Princess in the epic Mahabharata

- Mahabharata character
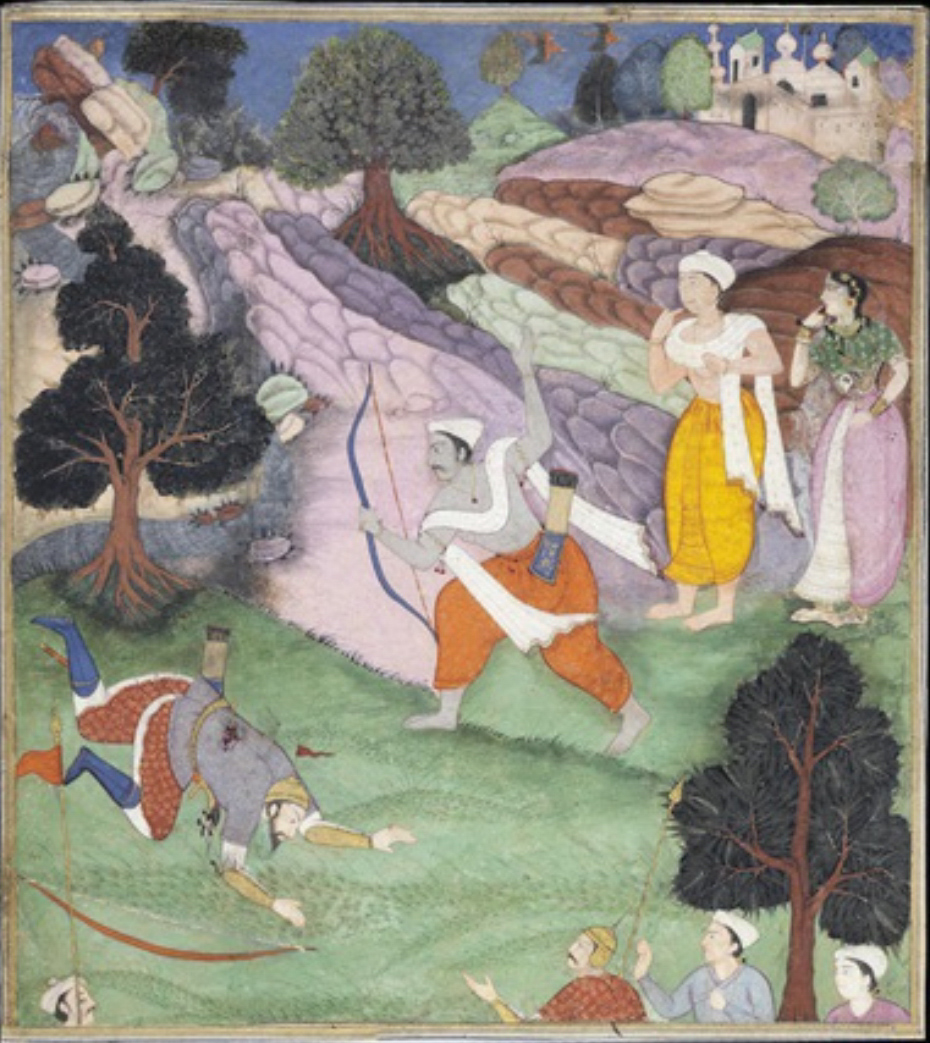
- Amba (right), along with a disciple, watches the battle between Bhishma and Parashurama, folio from Razmnama (Persian translation of the Mahabharata), c. 1616 CE

Information
- Position: Princess of Kashi Kingdom
- Family: Kashya (father); Kausalya (mother); Ambika, and Ambalika (sisters); Senabindu (brother)
- Home: Kashi Kingdom

Amba (Sanskrit: अम्बा, romanized: Ambā) is a character in the Hindu epic Mahabharata. She is the eldest and most beautiful daughter of Kashya, the King of Kashi, and the sister of Ambika and Ambalika.

Amba, along with her sisters, were abducted by Bhishma during their svayamvara ceremony, as brides to marry Vichitravirya, the King of Hastinapura. Before the wedding ceremony, the princess approaches Bhishma, and informs him of her love for King Salva, upon which she is allowed to go to the latter and urge him to accept her as his wife. To her dismay, Salva rejects her, regarding her to have been customarily accepted by Bhishma as his wife. Despite her efforts, as well as those of Parashurama, Bhishma refuses to marry her. Amba holds Bhishma responsible for her misfortune, undertaking a penance, and is granted a boon by Shiva. She is reborn as Shikhandi, the child of King Drupada, and the sibling of the epic's female protagonist, Draupadi.

== Etymology ==
Amba is a commonly used word in Sanskrit meaning mother, also with Vedic linkage as the mother of the Vedas.

== Legend ==
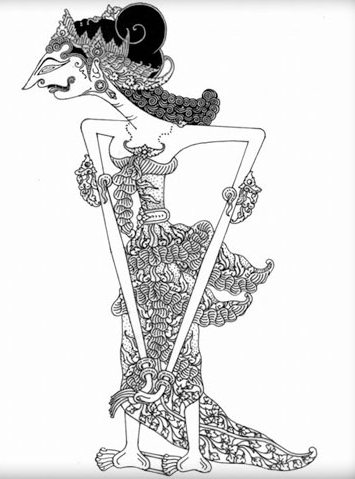
Javanese Wayang Puppet of Amba

=== Svayamvara ===
The Adi Parva of the Mahabharata narrates the events of Amba's svayamvara at the Kingdom of Kashi. Amba and Salva, the King of Salva, were secretly in love and Amba had promised to place the varmala on his neck, thereby choosing him as her bridegroom. Bhishma learned of the ceremony of the three virtuous princesses, and went to the svayamvara to win the princesses for his step-brother Vichitravirya. Upon arrival, Bhishma announced his intention to abduct the brides, challenging the assembled suitors to stop him. Bhishma then forced the princesses into his chariot and rode away. The kings followed and showered Bhishma with arrows; however, Bhishma returned the attack and defeated them. Salva challenged Bhishma for a duel; Bhishma overpowered and wounded Salva, but spared his life. Unaware of Amba's feelings, Bhishma proceeded to Hastinapura and presented them to Satyavati, who made arrangements for their marriage to Vichitravirya. Amba approached Bhishma and the council of Brahmins and revealed that she and Salva were in love with each other and that she had been going to choose him as her husband in the svayamvara. Bhishma conceded that she should make her own decision regarding the matter and sent her to Salva with honours, while Ambika and Ambalika were married to Vichitravirya.

=== Salva's rejection ===
In the Ambopakhyanaparvan chapter of the book Udyoga Parva of the Mahabharata, the rest of Amba's tale is narrated by Bhishma when Duryodhana questions him as to why he did not kill Shikhandi, an ally of the Pandavas, the cousins and foes of the Kauravas.

Bhishma ensured that Amba was escorted safely to Salva's kingdom. Amba informed Salva that she had come for him. Salva retorted that he no longer desired her, as she was to be wed to another man. He declared that she had been rightfully won by Bhishma, who had defeated and insulted him and the other kings. He accused her of leaving with him of her own free will. Amba pleaded with Salva, whom she considered her true love, to accept her. But Salva reiterated his Kshatriya dharma and refused to accept her. Rejected, the heart-broken Amba left the Salva Kingdom and retired to the forest.

In another version, Amba stung by this rejection went to Bhishma and accosted him, stating that he was responsible for all her problems. Bhishma tried to convince Vichitravirya to marry Amba, but he rejected her stating that she was in love with someone else. She then approached Bhishma to marry her. He also refused due to his vow of celibacy. This further infuriated Amba, as she had now been spurned by three bachelors. She appealed to various kings to defeat Bhishma and bring her justice, but all of them refused, knowing Bhishma's capabilities. Finally, the furious Amba went to the forest to please the devas so that she may have her revenge on Bhishma.

=== Parshurama's mediation ===
Amba reflected on her plight and considered all the people responsible for it, including herself (as she did not escape Bhishma's chariot when Bhishma was fighting Salva), Bhishma (who abducted her), Salva (who rejected her) and her father (who arranged her svayamvara). She finally arrived at the conclusion that Bhishma was the main culprit and swore to destroy him by austerities or battle. She sought shelter with a group of ascetics that night and narrated her tale to them. There the learned sage Shaikhavatya consoled Amba and promised to guide her in her austerities.

Other sages discussed amongst themselves Amba's situation and contemplated her alternatives and advised her to return to her father as there are only two true protectors of a woman: a father and a husband. However, Amba declined, deciding to practice austerities. The next day, the sage Hotravahana (of the Srinjaya race), a former king and Amba's maternal grandfather, passed by the place. Upon listening to Amba's woe, the sage advised her not to return to her father and instead approach the sage Parashurama. Akritavrana, one of Parashurama's disciples, also arrived at the place. Hotravahana introduced Amba to Akritavrana and both of them explained Amba's ordeal to him. Akritavrana gave Amba two options: either Parashurama should approach Salva to marry her or Bhishma should be defeated by Parashurama. Amba asked Akritavrana to decide who was her culprit. Akritavrana agreed with Amba that Bhishma was the root cause of her plight and should be the target of her revenge. Akritavrana and Hotravahana explained Amba's predicament to Parashurama, whom Amba herself prayed to for help. Parashurama gave his word to Amba that he would slay Bhishma, who was his disciple in the past, and destroy his pride.

When Parashurama arrived with his retinue at Kurukshetra and sent a message to Bhishma of his arrival, Bhishma came to see his guru, offering him the traditional respects. A pleased Parashurama commanded Bhishma to accept Amba. Bhishma refused, restating that he had taken a vow of celibacy. An infuriated Parashurama threatened Bhishma with death. Bhishma tried to calm the sage, but in vain, and he finally agreed to battle his guru to safeguard his Kshatriya duty. Ganga tried stopping the battle by beseeching her son as well as the great sage, but failed. The great battle lasted for 23 days, without any result. On the 24th day when Bhishma chose to use a deadly weapon, at the behest of the divine sage Narada and the devas, Parashurama ended the conflict and the battle was declared a draw. Parashurama narrated the events to Amba and told her to seek Bhishma's protection. However, Amba refused to listen to Parashurama's advice and left angrily declaring that she would achieve her objective by asceticism.

=== Austerities ===
Amba gave up food and sleep, and practised asceticism standing still for six months in the Yamuna river valley, surviving only on air. She became emaciated and developed matted locks. After that, she stood in the waters of the Yamuna, without food and practised austerities. After that, she spent time standing on her tip toes, having eaten only one fallen leaf of a tree. Her penance for twelve years started burning the heavens and the earth. She then went to Vatsa kingdom, in which many renowned sages lived. She roamed the kingdom, bathing in the sacred waters of the Ganges (Ganga) and the Yamuna. Then, she visited the ashrams of many sages like Narada, Uluka, Chyavana, Vishwamitra, Mandavya, and Garga, as well as sacred sites like Prayaga, Bhogavati, and holy groves. During her journey, she observed difficult vows and performed ablutions in the holy waters.

The goddess Ganga appeared before Amba and listened to Amba's tale that her austerities were aimed to destroy Bhishma, Ganga's son. The angry goddess Ganga replied that since Amba's mind was crooked, she would become a crooked and tortuous river, which will remain dry for eight months and flow in the four months of the rainy season. Ganga declared that the bathing places along the river's course would be in difficult terrain, and it will be infested with crocodiles and other fierce creatures. Amba wandered practising severe vows and forgoing food and water for months. She visited many tirthas in this time and finally returned to Vatsa, where Ganga's curse materialized. Though half of her became the river Amba, the other half remained human, due to her ascetic merit.

=== Shiva's boon and Amba's death ===
The ascetics of Vatsa dissuaded her from the austerities, but Amba maintained her resolve and told them her desire was to be born a man and slay Bhishma to avenge her misery. The god Shiva appeared to her and blessed her that she would become a man in her next birth and destroy Bhishma. Amba would be born to the king Drupada of Panchala and become a great warrior. Amba would remember her previous birth and hatred of Bhishma. Pleased with the boon, Amba created a funeral pyre of wood on the banks of the Yamuna and jumped in the fire saying "for Bhishma's destruction!".

=== Garland of ever-fresh lotuses ===
Another variant narrates that Amba performed austerities and pleased Kartikeya, the god of war and Shiva's son. He granted her a garland of ever-fresh blue lotuses and declared that whoever wore it will destroy Bhishma. With this garland, Amba made one more attempt to seek help of many kings and princes to support her in her just cause. However, there was no response from anyone of them to help her as they did not want to be on the wrong side of Bhishma. In a final effort she approached Drupada but even he declined; in frustration she cast the garland off on a pillar outside Drupada's palace and went for austerities in the forest again. While Amba kills herself, no one dares to touch the garland.

=== Rebirth as Shikhandi ===
Drupada had no children, and so he engaged himself in austerities in the forest, seeking the blessings of Shiva for begetting a son. Shiva granted him the boon that a girl would be born to him, but would transform into a boy later. As prophesied, Amba was reborn as Shikhandi, whose true sex was not disclosed, and she was brought up as a boy. When Drupada got his daughter in the garb of a son married to the daughter of Hiranyavarna, the King of Dasharna, her true identity was revealed, not only to the chagrin of the girl, her father, but also to Shikhandi herself. The agitated Hiranyavarna declared war on Panchala. Distressed by the turn of events, Shikhandi went into the forest to meet a yaksha (a nature spirit), Sthunakarna, who helped her by offering to exchange their sexes for a period of time. Thus, Shikhandi became biologically male. After Hiranyavarna's death, Shikhandi returned to swap sexes with the yaksha, but learnt that the yaksha had been cursed by Kubera to remain female until Shikhandi's death.

In the variant where the garland of ever-fresh blue lotuses is mentioned, one day, Shikhandi finds the garland during her military training in the forest, and Drupada realises that she would slay Bhishma.

Meanwhile, over the course of time, Ambika and Ambalika had grandchildren: the Kauravas and the Pandavas, who became arch-enemies. Draupadi, the daughter of Drupada, was married to the Pandavas. When a great Kurukshetra War between the Pandavas and the Kauravas ensued, Shikhandi sided with his brothers-in-law, while Bhishma stood with the Kauravas. Bhishma had vowed "not to shoot at a woman, anyone who used to be a woman or has a woman's name or appears to be a woman", and so he narrated the tale of Amba to Duryodhana, and refused to fight Shikhandi. When Bhishma led the Kaurava army, Shikhandi rode as the charioteer of Arjuna, the third of the Pandava brothers. On seeing Shikhandi, Bhishma lowered his weapons. Shikhandi and Arjuna pierced Bhishma's body, though all Shikhandi's arrows were not effective in wounding Bhishma. At this stage, it was also the desire of Bhishma to die. Before collapsing, he cried out that it was Arjuna's arrow that had killed him, and not of Shikhandi. Bhishma lay on a bed of arrows for days, and died on the holy day of Uttarayana. Thus, Amba's vengeance was fulfilled, when Shikhandi became the cause of Bhishma's death.

Shikhandi is killed in a sword fight with Ashwatthama when he, Kripacharya, and Kritavarma attacked the Pandava camp on the night of the final day of the war.
