= Kindama =

Sage in the Hindu epic Mahabharata

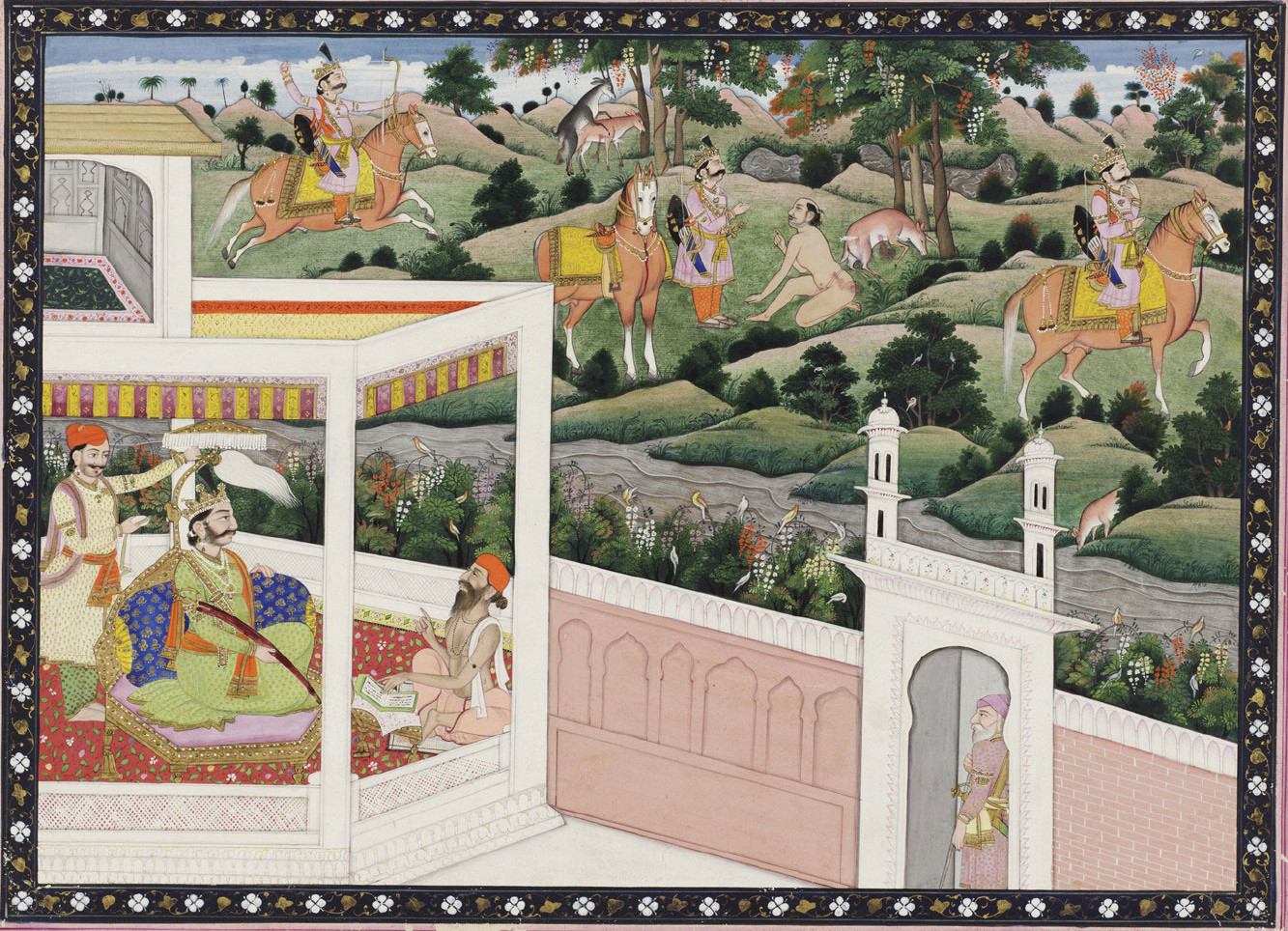
King Pandu shoots Kindama.

Kindama (Sanskrit: किन्दम) is a rishi featured in the Hindu epic Mahabharata.

== Legend ==
Once, the sage Kindama and his wife were mating in the form of a deer and a doe. King Pandu of Hastinapura, who had been hunting there, shot an arrow, mistaking them for deer, mortally injuring them. Enraged, Kindama assumed his true form, and berated the king for having killed him before he had finished the act of mating. Before dying, Kindama cursed Pandu that he would die the moment he would touch his wife with the intention of making love.
