= Bahlika (king) =

King in a Sanskrit epic

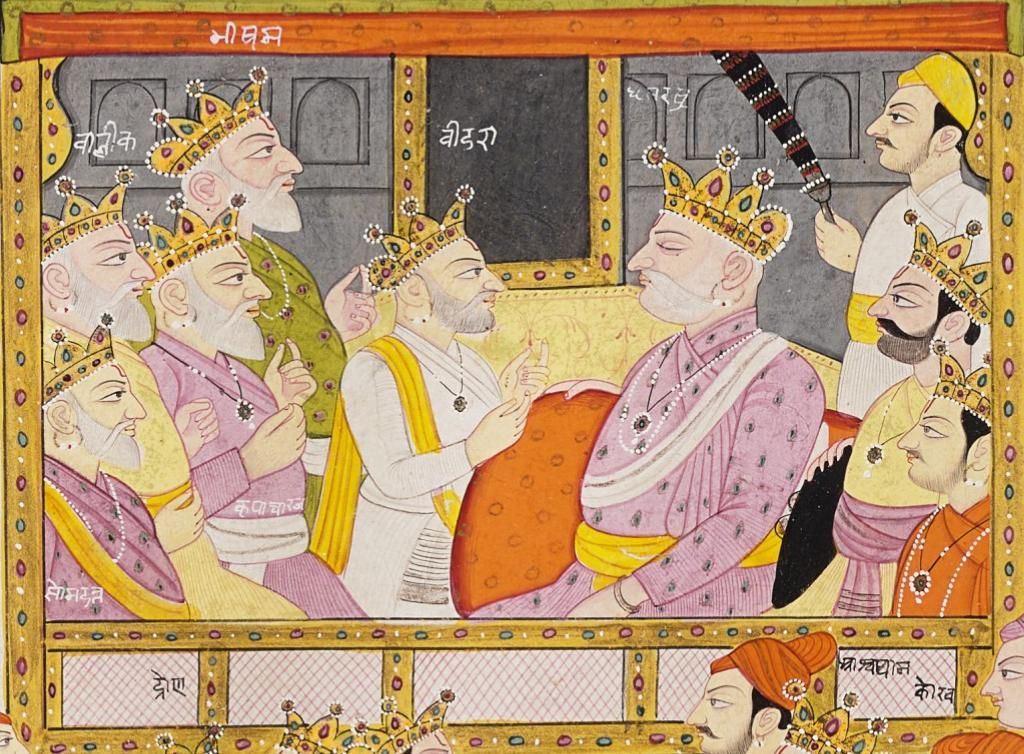
- Pahari miniature depicting Bahlika (leftmost, in ivory garments) in a conference before Kurukshetra War

Information
- Family: Pratipa (father); Sunanda (mother); Devapi, Shantanu (brothers)
- Children: Somadatta (son); Rohini (daughter)
- Relatives: Bhurishravas (grandson); Bhishma (nephew)

Bahlika (Sanskrit: बाह्लिक), also spelled Vahlika or Balhika, was a king of the Bahlika kingdom mentioned in Hindu literature, most notably the Mahabharata. He was the second son of King Pratipa of the Lunar dynasty and the elder brother of Shantanu, who later became the king of Kuru Kingdom and the father of Bhishma. Bahlika was also a prominent elder of the Kaurava lineage and participated in the events leading up to and during the Kurukshetra War.

== Biography ==
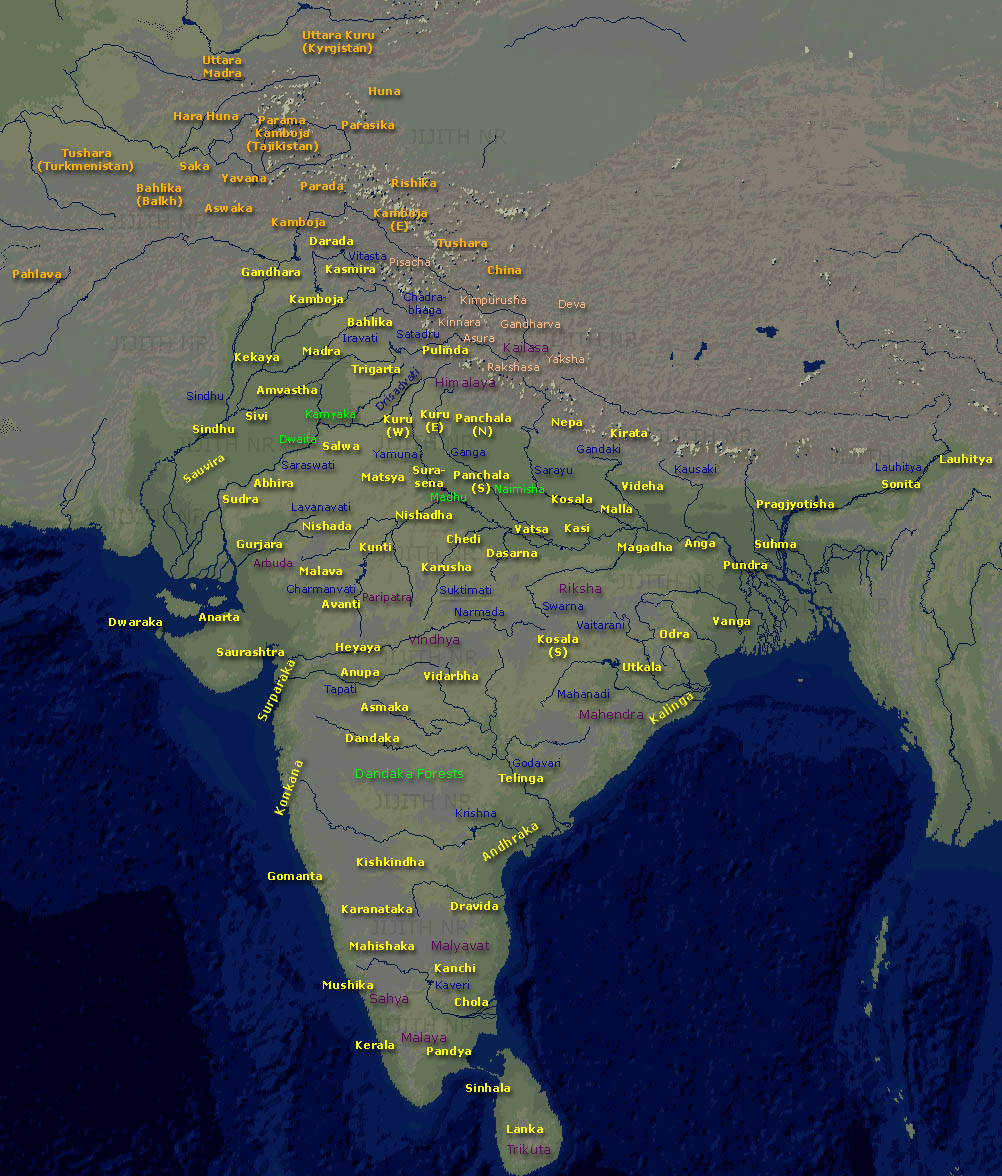
Bahlika Kingdom alongside other locations of kingdoms and republics mentioned in the Indian epics or Bharata Khanda

=== Accession to the throne ===
Bahlika was the second of the three sons of Pratipa and his wife Sunanda, the king and queen of Hastinapura. With his eldest son Devapi set to inherit, Bahlika inherited his maternal kingdom; as Sunanda hailed from the kingdom named Bahlika. However, due to leprosy, Pratipa's eldest son Devapi refused to ascend the throne and retired into the woods to perform penance. Shantanu then became the crown prince and upon Pratipa's death became the king of Hastinapura, with Bahlika's blessing. In some later versions of the story, Bahlika was gifted the land Jarasandha for agreeing not to join Panchala in a war against Magadha)

=== Family ===
Bahlika had a son named Somadatta, who in turn had several sons, including Bhurishravas, Bhuri, and Shala. According to Harivamsha, He also had a daughter—Pauravi (also called Rohini)—who married Vasudeva of the Yadava clan. Rohini is identified as the mother of Balarama and Subhadra. Pauravi's sons included Avagaha and Nandaka. Somadatta's daughter was married to the king of Kashi, Abhibhu, who later fought on the Kaurava side during the Kurukshetra War.

=== Before the Kurukshetra War ===
Bahlika was present at significant events in the Kuru dynasty, including the demonstration of martial skills by the Kuru princes and the coronation of Yudhishthira as crown prince. During the Rajasuya yajna of Yudhishthira, Bahlika acknowledged his authority and presented him with a golden chariot. He also attended the infamous dice game that led to the Pandavas' exile.

Later, Bahlika sought to dissuade both the Kauravas and the Pandavas from engaging in war, advocating for peace among the Bharatas. However, once hostilities commenced, he aligned himself with the Kauravas.

=== During the Kurukshetra War ===
Bahlika and his kingdom fought on the side of Duryodhana during the war. Bhishma considered him to be an Atirathi. On the first day, Bahlika fought against Dhrishtaketu. On the ninth day, Bhima destroyed Bahlika's chariot; however, he was saved by Lakshmana Kumara. On the thirteenth day, he participated in the killing of Abhimanyu (he is not mentioned as an active participant, and is assumed to be a silent bystander). On the fourteenth day, he fought against the Upapandavas and Shikhandi, simultaneously, resisting them.

=== Death ===
On the fourteenth day of the war, Bahlika slew Senavindu. Afterwards, Satyaki battled Bahlika's son Somadatta and knocked him unconscious with his arrows. Furious, Bahlika rushed to his son's aid, only to be counter-checked by Bhima. Bahlika struck Bhima with a dart that made him delirious. Upon recovering his senses, Bhima hurled a mace at Bahlika's head, killing him.

The war would extinguish Bahlika's line. His only child and heir, Somadatta, as well as Somadatta's oldest son, Bhurishravas, were killed by Satyaki. In the Chatahurdi compilation, Bhurishravas's nine interpolated brothers die as well. Bhurishravas's two sons, Pratipa and Prajanya, were killed by Abhimanyu on the thirteenth day of the war.
