= Devapi =

Information
- Family: Pratipa (father) Shantanu (brother)

Devapi (Sanskrit: देवापि, Devāpi, lit. friend of Gods) or Devāpi Arṣṭiṣeṇa, is an immortal sage. According to the Nirukta (ii.10), the Brihaddevata, the Mahabharata, and the Puranas, he was a Kuru prince and the eldest son of King Pratipa of Hastinapura. He was a noble and well-liked prince but he was not allowed to succeed Pratipa, because he was affected with leprosy and the council of Brahmanas and elderly citizens were opposed to this proposal. As a result of this, his younger brother Shantanu succeeded Pratipa as the king of Hastinapura. Later Devapi retired to the forest for penance. According to the Matsya Purana and the Bhagavata Purana, he along with the sage Maru will remain alive till the end of the present Kali Yuga at a place called Kalapagrama and will revive the Paurava dynasty in the next Satya Yuga.

== Drought in Kuru realm ==
According to the Brihaddevata of Shaunaka, when Devapi abdicated the throne in favour of Shantanu and left for the forest, the realm of Kuru suffered from severe drought for twelve years, as Parjanya did not rain. Finally, Shantanu along with his subjects went to the forest and offered him the Kuru throne, which he declined. Instead, he agreed to become Shantanu's purohita (priest) and conduct a yajna (sacrifice) for him to produce rain. A later version of this narrative is found in the Vishnu Purana (IV.20) According to the Vishnu Purana, the reason for drought, as explained to Shantanu by his brahmin ministers, was the displeasure of the gods because of Shantanu's ascending the throne in place of his elder brother, a violation of the law of primogeniture. When a wily minister of Shantanu heard this, he dispatched a number of heretics to the forest, who perverted the simple-minded prince Devapi in anti-Vedic doctrines. When the Brahmins sent by Shantanu came to the forest to offer him the throne, he advanced arguments contrary to the precepts of the Vedas. As a result, Brahmins declared him degraded and unfit to rule, whereupon there was rain.

== In Rigveda ==
In Rigveda, Devapi is always mentioned as Devāpi Arṣṭiṣeṇa.The Rigveda (X.98) mentions that Devapi conducted yajna for rain in Shantanu's kingdom. Modern scholars are not unanimous about the true meaning of Arṣṭiṣeṇa. Modern scholars, which include S.N. Pradhan and V.S. Misra believe, that, Devapi after becoming a brahmana, entered Ṛṣṭiṣeṇa gotra.
