= Ambika (Mahabharata) =

Mother of Dhritarashtra in the epic Mahabharata

- Mahabharata character

Information
- Position: Queen of Kuru Kingdom
- Family: Kashya (father); Kausalya (mother); Amba, and Ambalika (sisters); Senabindu (brother)
- Spouse: Vichitravirya
- Children: Dhritarashtra by Vyasa
- Origin: Kashi Kingdom

Ambika (Sanskrit: अम्बिका, romanized: Ambikā) is a queen of the Kuru kingdom in the Hindu epic Mahabharata. The second daughter of Kashya, the King of Kashi, and Kausalya, she is abducted by Bhishma during her svayamvara, and becomes the wife of Vichitravirya, the King of Hastinapura. Ambika is the mother of Dhritarashtra and the grandmother of the Kauravas.

== Legend ==
Mahabharata Partial Family Tree

Along with her sisters, Amba and Ambalika, Ambika was taken by force by Bhishma from their svayamvara, the latter having challenged and defeated the assembled royalty. He presented them to his step-mother, Satyavati, for marriage to Vichitravirya. While Amba expressed her desire not to marry him as she was in love with a king named Salva, Ambika and Ambalika married Vichitravirya, and spent seven years in their husband's company. Vichitravirya was afflicted with tuberculosis, and subsequently died from the disease.

After Vichitravirya's death, he left behind no heirs. His mother Satyavati sent for her first born, the rishi Vyasa. She asked him to sire children with the widowed queens of Vichitravirya according to the prevalent custom of Niyoga. Vyasa had come from years of intense meditation, and as a result, looked tremendously unkempt. When he approached Ambika, she closed her eyes in fear. As a result, the blind Dhritrashtra was born from their union. When he approached Ambalika, she turned pale in fear. Her son Pandu, the result of their union, was born with a pale appearance.

After the death of Pandu, Ambika accompanied her mother-in-law Satyavati, and sister Ambalika to the forest, and spent the rest of her days in spiritual retreat.

== In popular culture ==
- In B. R. Chopra's 1988 series Mahabharat, Ambika was portrayed by Meena Chakrabarty.
- In the 2013 Star Plus's series Mahabharat (2013), Ambika was portrayed by Aparna Dixit.
