= Kṣemaka =

Raja of Vatsa from 378 to 340 BCE

King of Vatsa
- Reign: c. 378 – c. 340 BCE (48 years)
- Predecessor: Nimi
- Successor: Mahapadma Nanda (Kuru dynasty annexed by Nandas)
- Died: c. 330 BCE
- Dynasty: Kuru
- Religion: Hinduism

Kṣemaka was the last king of Vatsa. He was defeated and dethroned by Magadha's Nanda emperor Mahapadma Nanda. Kṣemaka was the last ruler of main Kuru dynasty branch, after his defeat the rule of Kurus end forever.

== Conquered by Nandas ==
Mahapadma Nanda of Magadha was an imperialistic ruler, he wanted to conquer all Kshatriya kingdoms. In this series he launched invasions on Kshatriya kingdoms and defeated them one by one. He defeated Kṣemaka and annexed Kuru dynasty into Magadha Empire.

According to Puranas Mahapadma Nanda, describe him as ekarat (sole sovereign) and sarva-kshatrantaka (destroyer of all the Kshatriyas). The Kshastriyas (warriors and rulers) said to have been exterminated by Mahapadma include Maithalas, Kasheyas, Ikshvakus, Panchalas, Shurasenas, Kurus, Haihayas, Vitihotras, Kalingas, and Ashmakas.

== See also ==
- Mahapadma Nanda
- Nanda Empire
- Kurukshetra War
- Mahabharat
- Kuru kingdom
- Ripunjaya

List of rulers

- List of Indian monarchs
- Puru and Yadu Dynasties
- List of monarchs of Magadha
