= Ambalika =

Mother of Pandu in the epic Mahabharata

- Mahabharata character

Information
- Position: Queen of Kuru Kingdom
- Family: Kashya (father); Kausalya (mother); Amba, and Ambika (sisters); Senabindu (brother)
- Spouse: Vichitravirya
- Children: Pandu by Vyasa
- Origin: Kashi Kingdom

Ambalika (Sanskrit: अम्बालिका, romanized: Ambālikā) is the queen of Kuru kingdom in the Hindu epic Mahabharata. The youngest daughter of Kashya, the King of Kashi and Kausalya, Ambalika is abducted by Bhishma during her svayamvara ceremony, and becomes the wife of Vichitravirya, the King of Hastinapura. She is the mother of Pandu and the grandmother of Pandavas.

== Legend ==
Mahabharata Partial Family Tree

Along with her sisters, Amba and Ambika, Ambalika was taken by force by Bhishma during their svayamvara, the latter having challenged and defeated the assembled royalty. He presented them to Satyavati for marriage to Vichitravirya. Ambalika and her sister spent seven years in their husband's company. Vichitravirya was afflicted with tuberculosis, and died from the disease.

After Vichitravirya's death, since he left no heirs, his mother Satyavati sent for her first born, the sage Vyasa. She asked him to father children with the widowed queens of Vichitravirya, according to the prevalent custom of niyoga. Vyasa had come from years of intense meditation, and as a result, he looked tremendously unkempt. When he approached Ambika, she closed her eyes in fear. As a result, the blind Dhritrashtra was born. When he approached Ambalika, she turned pale in fear. Her son Pandu, as the result of the niyoga, was born with a pale appearance.

Her son Pandu was married to Kunti and Madri. She is the grandmother of Pandavas – Yudhishthira, Bhima, Arjuna, Nakula and Sahadeva, who were the central characters of the epic.

After the death of Pandu, Ambalika accompanied her mother-in-law Satyavati, and sister Ambika, to the forest, and spent the rest of her days in spiritual retreat.

== In popular culture ==
- In B. R. Chopra's 1988 series Mahabharat, Ambalika was portrayed by Menaka Babbar.
- In the 2013 Star Plus's series Mahabharat (2013), Ambalika was portrayed by Mansi Sharma.
