= Satyavati =

Second wife of King Shantanu in the epic Mahabharata

- Mahabharata character
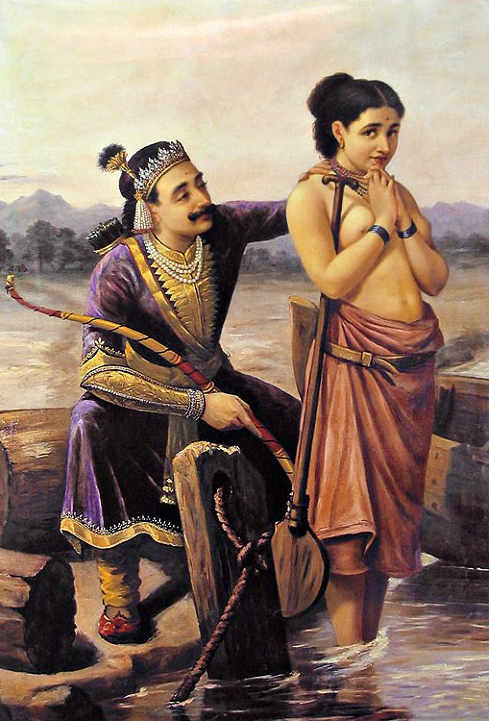
- Shantanu with Satyavati, a painting by Raja Ravi Varma

Information
- Aliases: Matsyagandha, Gandhavati, Yojanagandha
- Position: Queen of Kuru Kingdom
- Family: Dasharaja (foster father); Uparichara Vasu (biological father); Adrika (biological mother); Matsya (twin-brother)
- Spouse: Shantanu
- Children: Vyasa (by Parashara); Chitrangada; Vichitravirya (by Shantanu); Bhishma (step-son)
- Religion: Hinduism
- Home: Kuru Kingdom

Satyavati (Sanskrit: सत्यवती, IAST: Satyavatī; also spelled Satyawati) is a character in the ancient Hindu epic Mahabharata. She was the queen of the Kuru kingdom, married to king Shantanu of Hastinapura, and is a great-grandmother of the Pandava and Kaurava princes. She is also the mother of the seer Vyasa, author of the epic. Her story appears in the Mahabharata, the Harivamsa, and the Devi Bhagavata Purana.

Satyavati was the foster daughter of a fisherman chieftain, Dasharaja and was brought up as a commoner on the banks of the river Yamuna. Satyavati was the biological daughter of the Chedi king Uparichara Vasu (Vasu) and a cursed apsara (celestial being), who was turned into a fish called Adrika. Due to the smell emanating from her body, Satyavati was known as Matsyagandha ("She who smells like fish"), and helped her father, Dasharaja, in his job as ferryman and fisherman.

As a young woman, Satyavati met the wandering rishi (sage) Parashara, who fathered her son Vyasa out of wedlock. The sage gave blessed her with a sweet, musky body fragrance that could spread across the distance of one yojana, which earned her names like Yojanagandha ("She whose fragrance is spread as far as a yojana") and Gandhavati ("fragrant one").

Later, King Shantanu, captivated by her fragrance and beauty, fell in love with Satyavati. She married Santanu on her father's condition that their children inherit the throne, denying the birthright of Shantanu's eldest son (and crown prince) Bhishma. Satyavati bore Shantanu two children, Chitrangada and Vichitravirya. After Shantanu's death, she and her sons ruled the kingdom with the help of Bhishma. Although both her sons died childless, she arranged for her eldest son, Vyasa, to father the children of the two widows of Vichitravirya through niyoga. The children, Dhritarashtra and Pandu, became the fathers of the Kauravas and Pandavas, respectively. After Pandu's death, Satyavati retired to the forest in penance and died there.

While Satyavati's presence of mind, far-sightedness and mastery of realpolitik are praised, her unscrupulous means of achieving her goals and her blind ambition are criticised.

== Literary sources and names ==
Little is said about Satyavati in the Mahabharata; however, later texts – the Harivamsa and the Devi-Bhagavata Purana – elaborate her legend.

Satyavati is known by numerous names in the Mahabharata, among them Daseyi, Gandhakali, Gandhavati, Kali, Matysyagandha, Satya, Vasavi and Yojanagandha. The name "Daseyi" – a term often used by her stepson Bhishma used to address her – means one of the Dasa or Kaivartta clan. Vasavi means "daughter of king Vasu". Her birth name, Kali indicates her dark complexion. Her other name, Satyavati means "truthful"; Satya means "veracity". As noted above, she was also known as Matsyagandha or Matsyagandhi in her earlier life – and Gandhakali (lit. fragrant dark one), Gandhavati, Kastu-gandhi and Yojanagandha in later life.

== Birth and early life ==
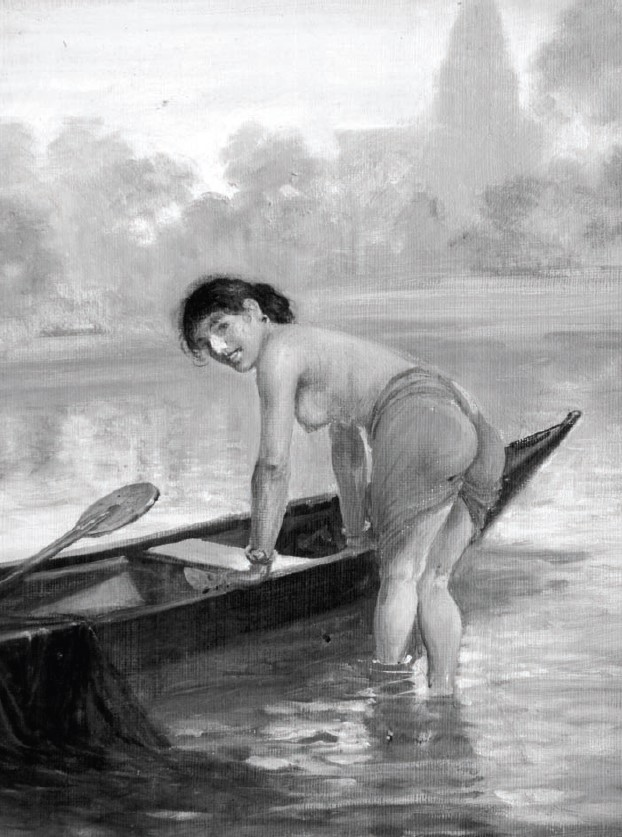
Matsyagandha by Ambika Dhurandhar

According to the Harivamsa, Satyavati in her previous life was Achchoda, daughter of the Pitrs (ancestors) and cursed to be born on earth. The Mahabharata, Harivamsa and Devi Bhagavata Purana assert that Satyavati was the daughter of a cursed apsara (celestial nymph) named Adrika. Adrika was transformed by a curse into a fish and lived in the Yamuna river. According to the legend, Vasu (also known as Uparicara Vasu), a Chedi King, was on a hunting expedition when he had a nocturnal emission while dreaming of his wife. Using an eagle, He sent his semen to his queen but due to fighting mid-air with another eagle, the semen fell into the river and was swallowed by the cursed Adrika-fish. Consequently, the fish became pregnant. Soon, A fisherman caught the pregnant fish and cut it open to find two babies in the womb of the fish, one male and one female. The fisherman presented the children to the king, who kept the male child. The boy grew up to become King Matsya, the founder of the Matsya Kingdom. The king gave the female child back to the fisherman, naming her Matsya-gandha ("She who smells like fish"). The fisherman raised the girl as his daughter and named her Kali ("the dark one") because of her complexion. Over the course of time, Kali earned the name Satyavati ("truthful"). The fisherman was also a ferryman, ferrying people across the river in his boat. Satyavati helped her father in his job and grew up into a beautiful maiden.

Historian Romila Thapar argues that the story portraying Satyavati as a king's daughter may have been added to the narrative later, as an attempt to give her a Kshatriya lineage rather than acknowledge her origins among lower-status fisherfolk. However, this claim lacks supporting evidence.

== Seduction by Parashara and birth of Vyasa ==
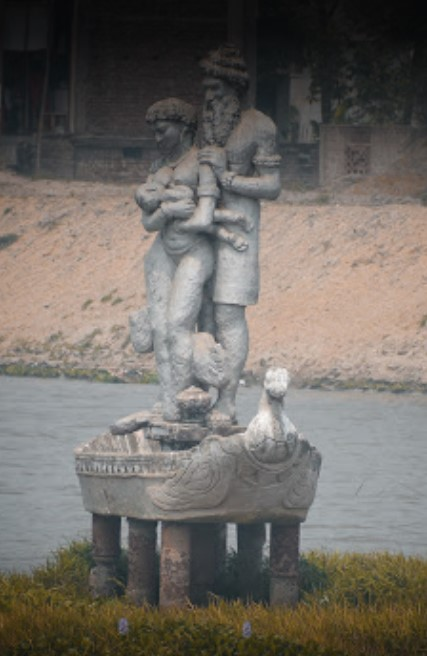
Statue of Parashara and Satyavati at Matsyagandha Lake, Bihar

The Devi Bhagavata Purana narrates that when Satyavati was ferrying the rishi Parashara across the river Yamuna, the sage wanted Satyavati to satisfy his lust and held her right hand. She tried to dissuade Parashara but finally gave in, realizing the desperation and persistence of the sage. Satyavati agreed and told Parashara to be patient until the boat reached the bank. On reaching the other side the sage grabbed her again, but she declared that her body stank and coitus should be pleasurable to them both. At these words, Matsyagandha was transformed (by the powers of the sage into Yojanagandha ("she whose fragrance can be smelled from across a yojana"). She now smelled of musk, and so was called Kasturi-Gandha ("musk-fragrant") and Parashara transformed into fisherman and had intercourse with Satyavati only to return her chastity again with his power of mantras. She asked Parashara to promise her that the coitus would be a secret and her virginity intact; the son born from their union would be as famous as the great sage, and her fragrance and youth would be eternal. Parashara granted her these wishes and was satiated by the beautiful Satyavati. After the act, the sage bathed in the river and left, never to meet her again. The Mahabharata abridges the story, noting only two wishes for Satyavati: her virgo intacta and everlasting sweet fragrance.

Ecstatic with her blessings, Satyavati gave birth the same day to her baby on an island in the Yamuna. The son immediately grew up as a youth and promised his mother that he would come to her aid every time she called on him; he then left to do penance in the forest. The son was called Krishna ("the dark one") due to his colour, or Dvaipayana ("one born on an island") and would later become known as Vyasa – compiler of the Vedas and author of the Puranas and the Mahabharata, fulfilling Parashara's prophecy. After this, Satyavati returned home to help her father.

== Marriage with Shantanu ==
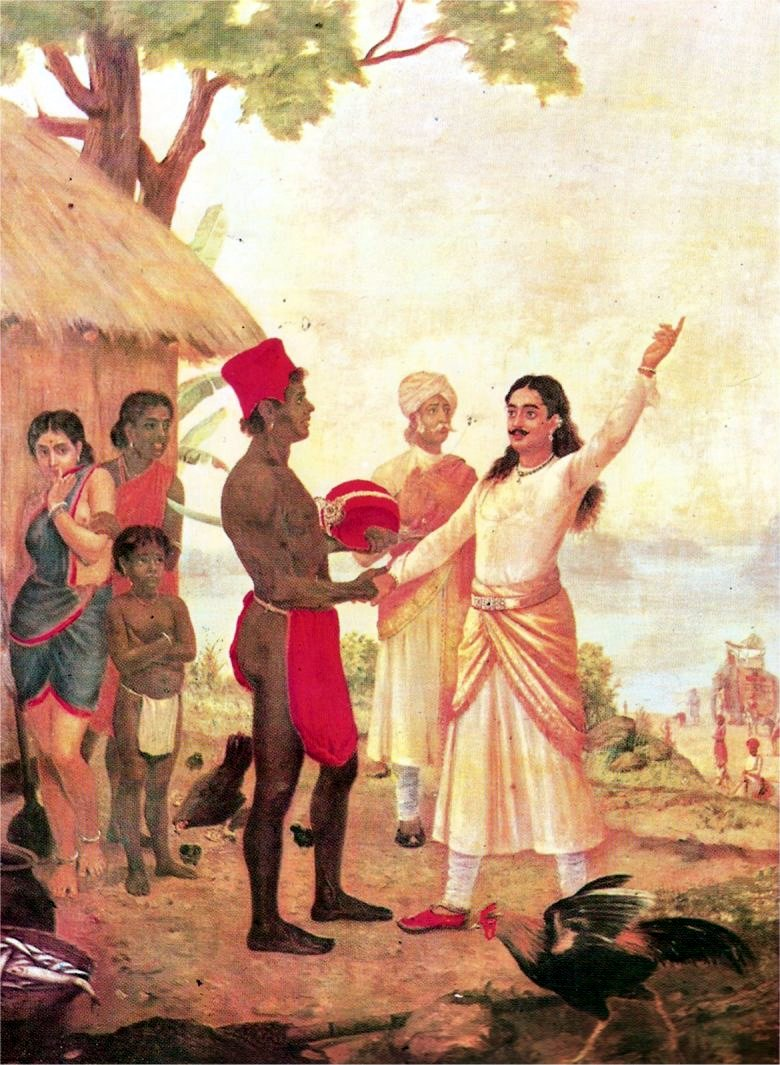
Bhishma's Oath, a painting by Raja Ravi Varma. Bhishma (earlier known as Devavrata) pledges to be celibate before Satyavati and her family.

One day Shantanu, the Kuru king of Hastinapur, came to the forest on a hunting trip and was mesmerized by the musk-fragrance emanating from Satyavati. Allured by her sweet scent, Shantanu reached Satyavati's house and, seeing her, fell in love at first sight. The king asked the fisherman-chief for his daughter's hand; the fisherman Dashraj said his daughter would marry the king if – and only if – her sons would inherit the throne.

The king, shocked and dejected, returned to the palace since he had already appointed his son, Devavrata, who was mothered by Goddess Ganga, as heir apparent. Devavrata was distressed by his father's condition; he learned about the promise asked by the fisherman-chief from a minister. Immediately, Devavrata rushed to the hut of the fisherman-chief and begged for Satyavati's hand on his father's behalf. The fisherman repeated his condition and told Devavrata that only Shantanu was worthy of Satyavati; she had rejected marriage proposals from even Brahmarishis like Asita.

Devavrata renounced his claim to the throne in favour of Satyavati's son, but the fisherman contended that Devavrata's children might dispute his grandson's claim. Intensely, Devavrata pledged the "terrible" vow of Brahmacharya – celibacy. The fisherman immediately gave Satyavati to Devavrata, who was henceforth called Bhishma ("the One who took a terrible vow"). Bhishma presented Satyavati to Shantanu, who married her.

In the Devi Bhagavata Purana, Satyavati's premarital first-born, Vyasa, laments that his mother abandoned him to fate immediately after birth. He returns to his birthplace in search of his mother who, he finds out, is now the queen of Hastinapur.

== Birth of children and grandchildren ==
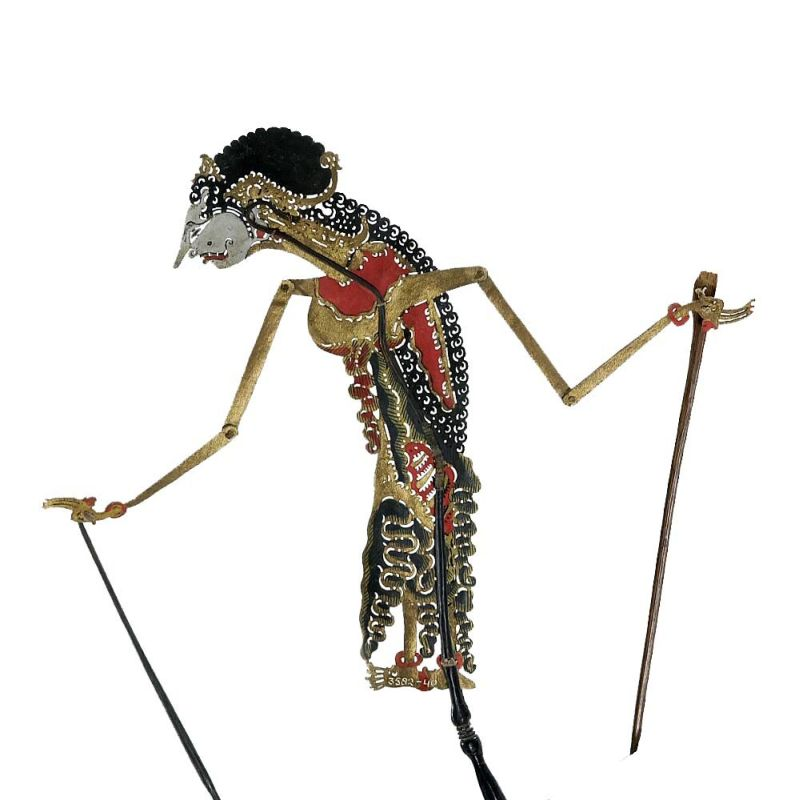
Satyavati in Javanese Wayang kulit shadow puppetry

After their marriage, Satyavati bore Shantanu two sons: Chitrangada and Vichitravirya. The Harivamsa tells of Bhishma recalling events after Shantanu's death. During the period of mourning after Shantanu's death, Ugrayudha Paurava (usurper of the throne of Panchala) demanded that Bhishma hand over Satyavati in return for wealth. Bhishma killed Ugrayudha Paurava, who had lost his powers because he lusted after another's wife. However, the Mahabharata does not include this event; it only describes Bhishma crowning Chitrangada as king under Satyavati's command. Chitrangada was later killed by a namesake gandharva (a celestial musician).

After Chitrangada's death, his young brother Vichitravirya was crowned king, while Bhishma ruled on his behalf (under Satyavati's command) until Vichitravirya grew up. Vichitravirya married the princesses of Kashi-Kosala: Ambika and Ambalika, who were won by Bhishma in a Swayamvara (marriage choice). The childless Vichitravirya met with an untimely death from tuberculosis.

With no heir to the throne, Satyavati asked Bhishma to marry the widows of Vichitravirya (following the practice of niyoga in its narrower sense, as a levirate marriage) and rule as king. Bhishma refused, reminding Satyavati of the promise he made to his father and his vow of bachelorhood. He suggests that a Brahmin could be hired to father children on the widows, thus preserving the dynasty. Revealing to Bhishma the tale of her encounter with Parashara, Satyavati well knew that this was the time to call her son Vyasa to aid her. Satyavati coaxed Vyasa to have niyoga with his brother's widows, saying: "from affection for thy brother Vichitravirya, for the perpetuation of our dynasty, for the sake of this Bhishma's request and my command, for kindness to all creatures, for the protection of the people and from the liberality of thy heart, O sinless one, it behooveth thee to do what I say." After convincing Vyasa, Satyavati managed (with great difficulty) to obtain the consent of her "virtuous" daughters-in-law. In the Mahabharata, Vyasa agreed immediately to the niyoga. In the Devi Bhagavata Purana version, Vyasa initially refused Satyavati's proposal. He argued that Vichitravirya's wives were like his daughters; having niyoga with them was a heinous sin, through which no good could come. As a master of "realpolitik", the hungry-for-grandsons Satyavati asserted that to preserve the dynasty, wrong directives by elders should be followed if they are going to reduce the sorrow of a mother. Vyasa finally agreed to that "disgusting task", but suggested that offspring of perversity cannot be a source of joy.

During the fertile period of the older queen, Ambika, Satyavati sent Vyasa to Ambika's bedchamber. During coitus with Vyasa, Ambika noticed his dark complexion and closed her eyes. Vyasa declared to Satyavati that due to Ambika's cruelty, her son would be blind (but strong) and have a hundred sons – later known as Kauravas (descendants of Kuru). Satyavati considered such an heir to be an unworthy king, so she asked Vyasa to have niyoga with her younger daughter-in-law. During their niyoga, Ambalika fell pale due to Vyasa's grim appearance. As the result the child would be pale and of ill-health, Vyasa told his mother, who begged for another child. In due course, the blind Dhritarashtra and the pale Pandu were born. Satyavati again invited Vyasa to Ambika's bed-chamber; she remembered Vyasa's grim appearance (and repulsive odour), and substituted a Shudra (lowest caste) maid in her place. The maid respected the sage and was not afraid of him, and Vyasa thus blessed her; her son would be the most intelligent man, and she would no longer be a slave. Vyasa told Satyavati of the deception who was not pleased, and then disappeared; Vidura, an incarnation of the god Dharma, was born to the maid.

== Last days ==
Consequently, due to Dhritarashtra's blindness and Vidura's birth from a maid, Pandu was crowned king of Hastinapur. However, he was out hunting when he shot a sage's wife by accident. The sage cursed him that he would never be able to take his wife in his arms, and that if he did he would die. Having received this course, he renounced the kingdom and went to the forest with his wives Kunti and Madri. There, his wives had children – the Pandavas, or "sons of Pandu" – for him through niyoga with the gods (Yama, Vayu, Indra, Ashwini Twins). Pandu died in the forest, when he mistakenly hugged Madri; Madri ended her life out of guilt for being the cause of Pandu's death. Kunti returned to Hastinapur with the Pandavas. Satyavati was grief-stricken because of her grandson's untimely death and did not wish to live any longer. After the funerary rites for Pandu, Vyasa warned Satyavati that happiness would end in the dynasty and devastating events would occur in the future (leading to the destruction of her kin), which she would not be able to bear in her old age. At Vyasa's suggestion, Satyavati left for the forest to do penance with her daughters-in-law Ambika and Ambalika. In the forest, she died and attained heaven. Within some days her daughters-in-law died too.

== Assessment ==
Dhanalakshmi Ayyer, author of Satyavati: Blind Ambition, introduces Satyavati as "the embodiment of the driving force of womanhood, with motherly ambition blinding her vision at every turn" and further says that "[i]n a way, Satyavati exemplifies what Rudyard Kipling succinctly put":

The Woman that God gave him, every fibre of her frame
Proves her launched for one sole issue, armed and engined for the same,
And to serve that single issue, lest the generations fail,
The female of the species must be deadlier than the male.

For Satyavati the end matters, not the means. Satyavati's life goal and ambition was to ensure the succession of Santanu's lineage and inheritance of his fortune by her sons but ironically (Ayyer comments), Bhishma – whose right to the throne Satyavati snatches – outlives her children in life and in fame. Her actions (and decisions) create a generation encompassed by a greed which ultimately leads to its annihilation. Ayyer concludes that "Satyavati's story teaches the new generation women that determination and commitment are different from avarice and calculation. One should know where greed takes over from ambition."

Pradip Bhattacharya, author of Of Kunti and Satyawati: Sexually Assertive Women of the Mahabharata, praises Satyavati's handling of her encounter with the sage Parashara. He notes that although young, she tackles the persistent sage with great maturity and presence of mind. Bhattacharya remarks, "With a maturity and frankness that astonishes us even in the twenty-first century, she points out that coitus ought to be mutually enjoyable." She is not deluded by the belief that the sage will marry her and asks for virginity to ensure her future status in society. Bhattacharya further comments on the sequence of her requests: the bodily fragrance to make the sexual act pleasant for both, the veil of mist to keep the act a secret, virginal status for her future and fame for her child – securing his fame and after practical aspects are sorted out, "eternally feminine" boons of lifelong youth and fragrance. Bhattacharya says: "Modern-day women could well wish that they were half as confident, clear-headed and assertive of their desires and goals as Satyavati." He further praises her "characteristic far-sightedness", when she ensures the future of her children with Santanu by disposing of the crown prince Bhishma. She brings her illegitimate son, Vyasa, onto the scene to father sons with her dead son's widows – turning the renowned "lunar dynasty, into the lineage of a dasa (slave) maiden".
