= Vichitravirya =

Kuru King and minor character in the epic Mahabharata

- Mahabharata character

Information
- Title: King of Kuru Kingdom
- Family: Shantanu (father); Satyavati (mother); Chitrangada (brother); Bhishma (half-brother); Vyasa (half-brother)
- Spouses: Ambika; Ambalika
- Children: The following were fathered by Vyasa through the Niyoga practice, for Vichitravirya: Dhritarashtra (son; from Ambika); Pandu (son; from Ambalika); Vidura (son; from a Shudra maid)
- Home: Kuru Kingdom
- Dynasty: Chandravamsha

Vichitravirya (Sanskrit: विचित्रवीर्य, romanized: Vicitravīrya, lit. 'marvellous heroism') is a figure in the Mahabharata, where he is featured as a Kuru king.

According to the Hindu epic, he is the youngest son of Queen Satyavati and King Shantanu, and the de jure grandfather of the Pandavas and the Kauravas. He is also the half-brother of Krishna Dvaipayana Vyasa and Bhishma.

== Literature ==
=== Mahabharata ===
Vichitravirya has an elder brother named Chitrāngada, whom his half-brother Bhishma placed on the throne of the kingdom of the Kurus after Shantanu's death; he is a mighty warrior, but the king of the Gandharvas defeats and kills him at the end of a long battle. Thereafter, Bhishma consecrates Vichitravirya, who is still a child, as the new king.

When he had reached manhood, Bhishma marries him to Ambika and Ambalika, the beautiful daughters of the king of Kashi. Vichitravirya loves his wives very much, and is adored by them. But even after seven years of sexual indulgence, he remains childless and falls ill of tuberculosis, and could not be healed despite the efforts of his friends and physicians. Like his brother Chitrangada, he dies childless. Subsequently, through niyoga, the practice of allowing a childless widow to conceive children with a man in place of her late husband, Vichitravirya's wives and a maid give birth to three children, Dhritarashtra, Pandu, and Vidura, fathered by his half-brother sage Vyasa.

Different texts share different stories surrounding the death of Vichitravirya. According to the Bhagavata Purana, he dies of a heart attack because of his attachment to his wives, Ambika and Ambalika. Vichitravirya was succeeded by Pandu and later Dhritarashtra.

== Historicity ==
A historical Kuru King named Dhritarashtra, son of Vichitravirya, is mentioned in the Kathaka Samhita of the Yajurveda (c. 1200–900 BCE) as a descendant of the Rigvedic-era King Sudas of the Bharatas.

== See also ==
- Historicity of the Mahabharata
