= Shantanu =

Kuru King and father of Bhishma in the epic Mahabharata

- Mahabharata character
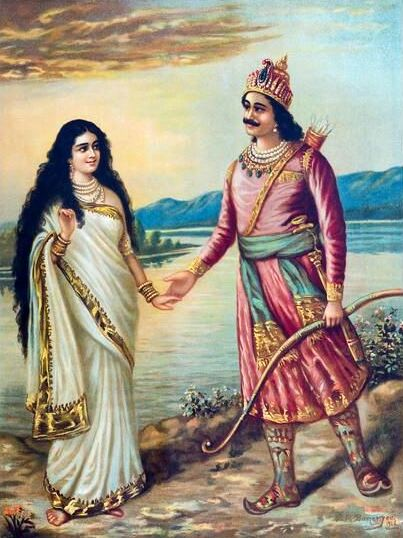
- Shantanu meets Ganga, chromolithograph by Bama Pada Banerjee

Information
- Title: King of Kuru Kingdom
- Family: Pratipa (father); Sunanda (mother); Devapi (brother); Bahlika (brother)
- Spouses: Ganga; Satyavati
- Children: Bhishma (by Ganga); Chitrangada; Vichitravirya (by Satyavati)
- Religion: Hinduism
- Home: Kuru Kingdom
- Dynasty: Chandravamsha

Shantanu (Sanskrit: शंतनु, शन्तनु, IAST: Śaṃtanu, Śantanu) was a king in the ancient India then Bharat mentioned in the epic Mahabharata. He was the King of the Kuru kingdom with his capital at Hastinapura. He was a descendant of the Bharata race, a forebearer of the lineage of the Chandravamsha, the father of Bhishma and the great-grandfather of the Pandavas and the Kauravas.

Shantanu was the youngest son of King Pratipa of Hastinapura and had been born during the king's later years. His eldest brother, Devapi, had leprosy and had given up his rightful claim before becoming a hermit. The middle son, Bahlika (or Vahlika), abandoned his birth kingdom, and had started living with his maternal uncle in Balkh, subsequently inheriting his kingdom. Shantanu, thus, ascended the throne of Hastinapura.

== Etymology ==
The meaning of the name can be explained by nirukti available in Adi Parva, through which Sri Nityananda Mishra elaborates its meaning as "the one who amplifies sukha (happiness) for others". Monier-Williams translates śaṁ-tanu as "wholesome for the body".

The Sambhava Parva of Mahabharata says that the old men of his kingdom who were touched by this monarch not only felt an indescribable sensation of pleasure but also became restored to youth. Therefore, this monarch was called Santanu.

== Brahma's curse and the birth of Shantanu ==
In his previous birth, there was a powerful king of the Ikshvaku dynasty named Mahabhisha. He possessed many virtuous qualities, and after performing a thousand Ashvamedha Yagnas and a hundred Rajasuya Yagnas (to qualify as emperor), he had attained heaven after his death. Once, he got an opportunity to visit the court of Brahma where all the Devas and Ganga were also present. While the celestials were worshipping Brahma, a wind blew and displaced Ganga's clothes revealing her body. Everybody present there lowered their gaze except Mahabhisha who kept gazing at her. Upon seeing this, Brahma lost his temper and cursed him to be born a mortal. Ganga who also relished the impious act was cursed to be born as human and come back only after breaking Mahabhisha's heart. Mahabhisha then requested Brahma that he, Mahabhisha, be born as the son of Kuru king Pratipa and his wish was granted by Brahma.

When the Pratipa was once meditating, Ganga took the form of a beautiful woman, approached the king and sat on his right thigh. When he asked her what she desired, Ganga requested him to become her husband. Pratipa however refused since he had taken a vow not to lust for anybody, and also that she had sat on his right thigh and according to traditions a man's right thigh was for his daughter or daughter-in-law while the left thigh was for his wife. He then proposed that she marry his son, to which she agreed.

A child was born to Pratipa and his wife Sunanda in their old age. He was named Shantanu because when he was born his father had controlled his passions by ascetic penances. Pratipa then installed Shantanu as king of Hastinapura and retired into the woods to perform penances. Bahlika, who was elder than Shantanu, also gave up his throne to Shantanu for becoming the king of Hastinapura.

== Marriage with Ganga ==
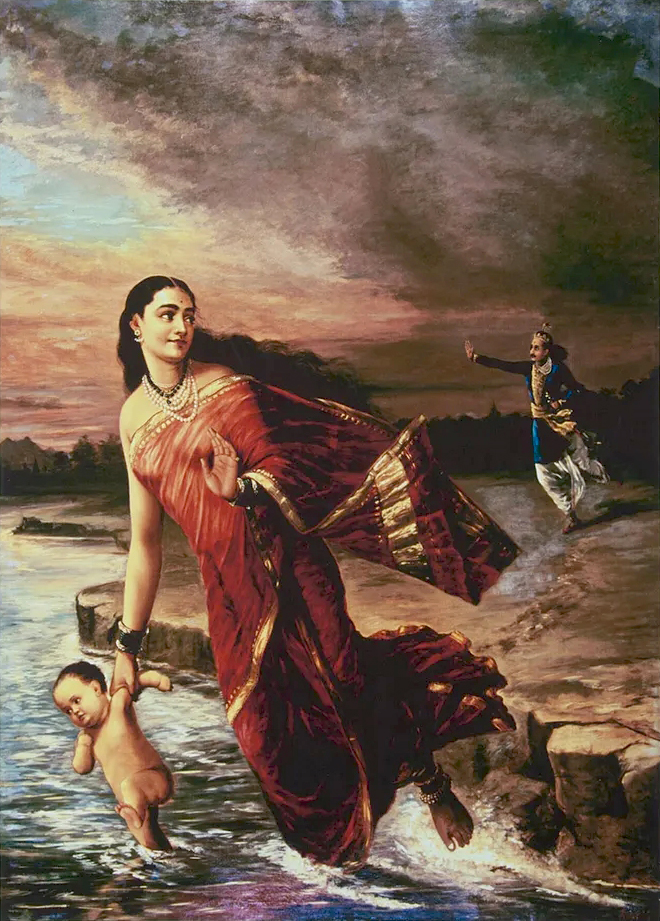
Shantanu stops Ganga from drowning their eighth child, who later was known as Bhishma.

Shantanu saw a beautiful woman on the banks of the river Ganga and asked her to marry him. She agreed but with one condition: that Shantanu would never question any of her actions. They married and later she gave birth to a son. But she drowned the child. Shantanu could not ask her the reason, because of his promise, lest she would leave him. Six sons were born to the couple over the years and drowned by Ganga.

When Ganga was about to drown their eighth son, the devastated Shantanu could not restrain himself and confronted her. Ganga explained to King Shantanu about Brahma's curse given to Mahabhisha and to her. She revealed to him that their eight children were the eight reincarnated Vasus who were cursed by sage Vasishtha to be born on earth as mortal humans. When the Vasus (except for the one called Prabhasa) pleaded for forgiveness, Vashishta limited his curse and told them that they would be freed from this curse upon their birth as humans. So, Ganga liberated the seven of them from human life by drowning them all. However, the Vasu Prabhasa was cursed to live a long life and not to have a wife or children. But he was also given a boon that would make him virtuous, conversant with all the holy scriptures and an obedient son to his father. Ganga said she would take him to train him properly for the king's throne and status. With these words, she disappeared along with the child, while Shantanu was struck with grief, pondering over spending the rest of his life without her.

== Reunion with his son ==
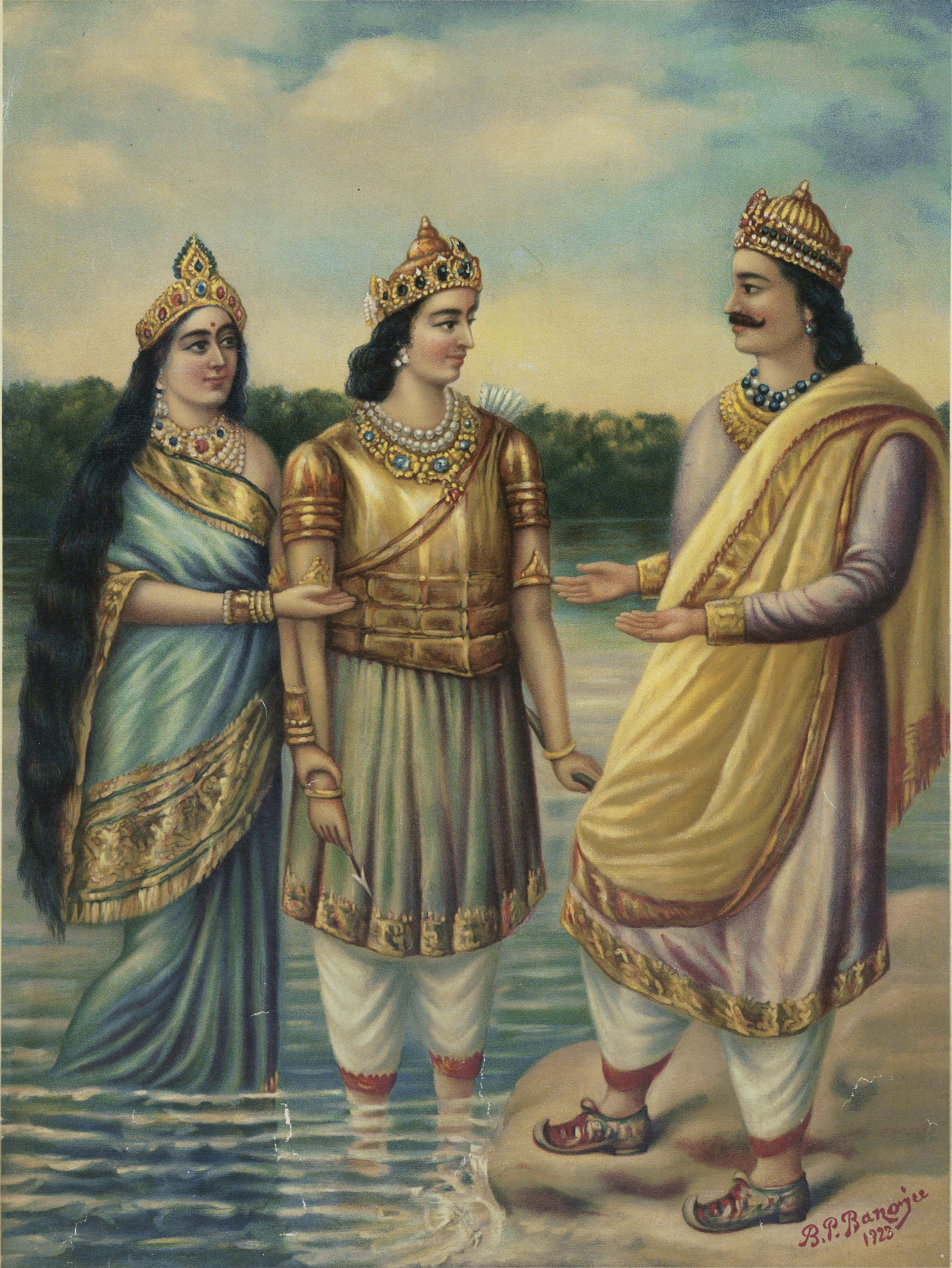
Ganga presents her son Devavrata (the future Bhishma) to his father, Shantanu.

Shantanu, filled with grief from the loss of his wife and son, began to practise Brahmacharya and ruled his kingdom extremely well. By merely adopting virtuous behaviour, Shantanu was easily able to conquer the entire world without lifting weapons. All the kings declared Shantanu as Emperor and his reign was a peaceful one. Shantanu gave up hunting and gained popularity from his subjects.

One day, while walking along the banks of the Ganga, Shantanu saw that the river had become shallow. While searching for the cause of this phenomenon, he came across a handsome young boy who had checked the river's flow with his celestial weapon. The young boy was his son whom he did not recognize him because he could see him only for a few moments after he was born. The boy recognized that he was his father; however, he did not reveal it to him. Instead he disappeared from his sight using his power of illusion. Shantanu upon seeing this wondered whether the boy was actually his son and called upon Ganga to show the boy to him. Ganga appeared and revealed to him that the boy was actually their son Devavrata and that he was taught the knowledge of the holy scriptures by sage Vasishtha and the art of warfare by Parshurama. After revealing the truth about Devavrata she told Shantanu to take him to Hastinapura. Upon reaching the capital Shantanu crowned Devavrata as his heir-apparent.

Although Shantanu was pained from his separation from Ganga, he was overjoyed upon receiving such an accomplished son. He performed seven Ashvamedha Yagnas on the banks of Yamuna with the help of Devavrata.

== Marriage with Satyavati ==
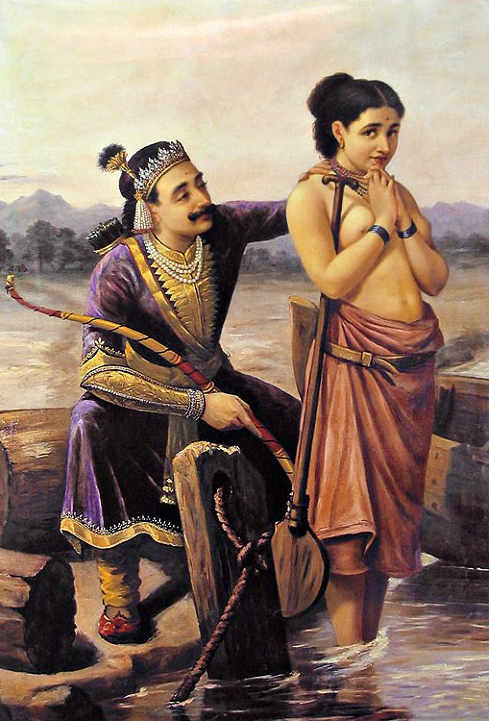
Shantanu and Satyavati, painting by Raja Ravi Varma

Four years later, Shantanu while travelling near the banks of Yamuna smelled a sweet scent coming from an unknown direction. While searching for the source of the fragrance, he came across Satyavati from whom the smell of scent was coming. Satyavati was an adopted daughter of the chief of the fishermen of her village. Upon seeing her, Shantanu fell in love with her and desired to marry her. Upon asking for his consent, her father agreed to the marriage on the condition that Satyavati's son would inherit the throne of Hastinapura.

King Shantanu was unable to meet this condition as his son Devavrata was the heir to the throne and was forlorn. Devavrata, however, realised the cause of his sorrow and for the sake of his father, gave his word to the chief that he would renounce all his claims to the throne, in favour of Satyavati's children. To reassure the skeptical chief further, Devavrata also vowed lifelong celibacy to ensure that future generations descended from Satyavati would also not be challenged by his offspring. Upon hearing this vow he immediately agreed to the marriage of Satyavati and Shantanu. Devavrata was then named as Bhishma (one who has taken a terrible vow) by the celestials. Devavrata returned to Hastinapura with Satyavati. Shantanu, unaware of his son's vow, married Satyavati. Eventually Shantanu learnt of his son's vow and was heartbroken. Later he became highly impressed with his son's love and affection and gave him a boon that he will only die if and when he decides to. Shantanu and Satyavati went on to have two sons, Chitrāngada and Vichitravirya. After Shantanu's death, Chitrangada became king of Hastinapura.

== Literature ==
- van Buitenen, J.A.B. (1973), Mahabharata, vol. 1, Chicago, The University of Chicago Press, pp. 216–230
- Shastri Chitrao, M.M.S. (1964), Bharatavarshiya Prachin Charitrakosha (Dictionary of Ancient Indian Biography, in Hindi), pp. 962–63
