= Chitrangada (king) =

Kuru King and minor character in the epic Mahabharata

- Mahabharata character
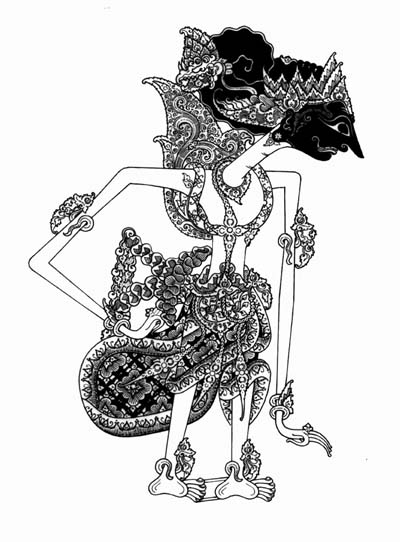
- Wayang puppet of Chitrangada

Information
- Title: King of Kuru Kingdom
- Family: Shantanu (father); Satyavati (mother); Vichitravirya (brother); Bhishma (half-brother)
- Home: Kuru Kingdom
- Dynasty: Chandravamsh

Chitrāngada (Sanskrit: चित्राङ्गद, IAST: citrāṅgada) was the king of the Kuru Kingdom with his capital at Hastinapura. He belonged to the Lunar Dynasty and the Bharata Tribe. He was the elder son of Shantanu and Satyavati, and ascended to the throne of Hastinapura after his father's death.

== Legend ==
Following the wishes of queen Satyavati, Bhishma had placed Chitrangada on the throne of the kingdom of the Kurus after Shantanu's death. Chitrangada was a great warrior and defeated many powerful enemies and Asuras. But soon he developed pride and began disrespecting everyone. Bhishma who tried to correct his young brother's bad behaviour was ignored and rendered powerless on account of his oath to perpetually serve the Kuru King. Finally, the king of the Gandharvas, who was his namesake, came to challenge him saying there could be only one Chitrangada which was himself. A fierce battle took place between the two warriors on the bank of the river Hiranyavati, lasting three years. In the end the king of the Gandharvas defeated the Kuru king and killed him. After having performed the rites of the dead, Bhishma immediately consecrated Chitrangada's younger brother Vichitravirya to the kingdom.
