= Niyoga =

Hindu's tradition of conception by proxy fathers

Niyoga (Sanskrit: नियोग) was a Hindu practice, primarily followed during the ancient period, in the Indian subcontinent. Niyoga permitted widows or wives who had no child by their husband to procreate with another man. The purpose of niyoga was to ensure the continuation of the family lineage and to mitigate the financial and social precariousness that a childless widow would have faced in society. Niyoga was forbidden in Kali Yuga by Rishi Brhaspati and other Manusmriti writers. It has been held that niyoga is not akin to polyandry. Sir Henry Maine argued that niyoga was of a later date than levirate marriage (the Hebrew practice of marrying a brother's widow if she had no son), while J. D. Mayne described levirate union as merely an enlarged form of niyoga that came into effect after a man's death. The practice enabled a woman to bear children upon union with a male possessing "desirable seed".

== Manusmṛti ==
In the Manusmṛti, niyoga is described in verses IX.59–63 and is permitted in IX.64–68. Verse IX.167 describes a child born through niyoga as a kshetraja (child of the wife).

== Clauses of Niyoga ==
There were various clauses associated with this process:

1. The woman would agree to this only for the sake of rightfully having a child but not for sexual pleasure.
2. The child thus born would be considered the child of the husband-wife and not that of the appointed man.
3. The appointed man would not seek any paternal relationship or attachment to this child in the future.
4. To avoid misuse, a man was allowed a maximum of three times in his lifetime to be appointed in such a way.
5. The act will be seen as that of Dharma and while doing so, the man and the wife will have only Dharma in their mind and neither passion nor lust. The man will do it as a help to the woman in the name of God, whereas the woman will accept it only to bear the child for herself and her husband.
6. There was to be no foreplay or contact with the upper body. The bodies of both the male and female were smeared with ghee. A curtain was placed between them to prevent them from seeing each other's faces, avoiding the arousal of passion. Only the legs of the female were kept uncovered during the process.

== Procedure ==
A wife or a widow must not, however, be forced to have recourse to Niyoga for inheritance or similar purposes. Baudhāyana and Vasistha say that a widow desiring Niyoga should avoid meat, honey etc. and sleep on the ground for a short period not exceeding one year. Six months after the death of her husband, she offered a funeral oblation to him. With the approval and assistance of her brother or father, her husband's relatives, and her family gurus, she then chose a man to father her child. A characterless, mad, diseased or very aged widow is not entitled to Niyoga. The proper time for niyoga was considered to be within sixteen years of maturity. Sickly men were to be avoided. She must be economically independent of the person whom she appoints for Niyoga and provide for the necessary expenses for food, unguents, etc. for herself (i.e. from the estate of her husband).

== Limitations ==
The practice of niyoga was outlined by Manu but later prohibited by him due to the progressive deterioration of the four world ages (yugas). According to traditional law, it must not be practiced by mortals in the present Kali Yuga. Brahma Purana (cited in the Vira-Mitrodaya and Aditya Purana) says "The niyoga, and the taking as sons other than the Aurasha and the Dattaka, are prohibited in the Kali age by the wise." Apastamba declared niyoga (or levirate) unfit for practice in a degenerate later age. Similarly, Manu repudiated widow remarriage as unsupported by Vedic hymeneal mantras, a view also echoed in a text attributed to Baudhayana cited in the Smriti-candrika. The Manusmriti outlines the conditions governing niyoga (IX.59–63) while simultaneously condemning it as an "animal practice" (paśu-dharma) (IX.64–69). According to Brihaspati, this juxtaposition of opposed views should not be seen as an inconsistency or interpolation, but rather as an indication of the practice's applicability and inapplicability across different time-cycles (yugas).

== Historical examples ==
The Haihaya (Kalachuri) ruler Raja Raj Singh (c. 1689–1712) begot a son through niyoga on the advice of his Brahmin councilors.

== In popular culture ==
Niyoga is the central issue of Anahat, a Marathi feature film directed by Amol Palekar. It was showcased at the International Film Festival of India 2003.

The film Eklavya: The Royal Guard features the practice as its central plot. The title character, played by Amitabh Bachchan, is torn between his duty and his emotions for children begotten through niyoga.

It is also portrayed in the 1989 film Oonch Neech Beech, where a sanyasi (played by Kulbhushan Kharbanda) is commanded by his teacher to perform niyoga.

== See also ==
- Yibbum
