= Sauptika Parva =

Tenth book of the Mahabharata

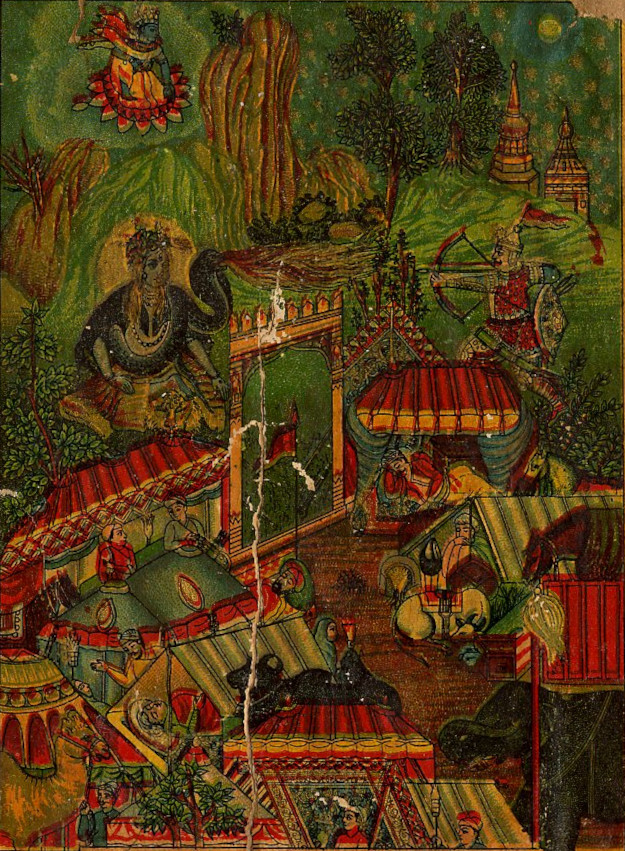
Ashwatthama propitiates Shiva (top) before making a night attack on the sleeping Pandava camp (bottom).

The Sauptika Parva (Sanskrit: सौप्तिक पर्व) ("Book of the Sleepers") is the tenth of the eighteen parvas (books) of the Indian epic Mahabharata. Sauptika Parva traditionally has 2 parts and 18 chapters, as does the critical edition.

Sauptika Parva is mainly the story of the revenge of the 3 survivors of the Kaurava army: Ashwatthama, Kritavarma and Kripacharya. These 3 attacked the Pandava camp at night, when everyone was sleeping, or inactive. Ashwatthama killed several warriors of the Pandava camp, such as the commander Dhrishtadyumna, the Draupadeyas, Shikhandin, Uttamaujas, Yudhamanyu and several others. Eventually, only 8 participants of the war from the Pandava camp—the Pandavas, Krishna, Satyaki and Yuyutsu—survive.

== Structure and chapters ==
The Sauptika Parva has 2 upa-parvas (parts, little books) and 18 adhyayas (chapters).

=== Sauptika Parva (chapters: 1–9) ===
Sauptika Parva describes the actions of Aswatthama, Kritavarman and Kripa—the three Kaurava survivors—after the 18th day of the Kurukshetra War. The three escape and retire in a forest. There Aswatthaman saw a baniyan tree roosted with crows in the night. As, however, those birds were sleeping securely, he beheld an owl suddenly make its appearance and slew a large number of his sleeping enemies. Aswatthama was already angry for his father's death and the deaths caused by the war. He comes up with a plan to massacre the remaining Pandava army while they sleep, on the night after the war is over. Kripa urges delay, questions the morality of killing those who sleep, and whether Aswatthama's plan to take revenge has any productive purpose. Aswatthama argues the whole war was unfair, everyone was unfair, and revenge is the only release. Aswatthama leaves to kill the sleeping, Kritavarman and Kripa follow him.

Those warriors reach the Pandava's camp and stopped at the gate of the encampment by a giant. Aswatthaman attacks him with weapons, but his weapons were either got broken after striking him or got devoured by that extraordinary guardian body. At last for the accomplishment of his purpose, he started worshipping Mahadeva. The divine Mahadeva at last seeing his sincerity appeared in person and giving him a broad Rudra sword, also provided him with a portion of his energy.

With this, Drona's son proceeded towards the camp, while other two waited at the gate. He first entered the chamber of the slayer of his sire, viz., Dhrishtadyumna and awoke him with a kick, then started choking him. The Panchala prince tore Aswatthaman with his nails and at last asked him to kill him with a weapon. Aswatthaman refused, and kills him giving violent kicks. At his cries others awoke, and Drona's son started unleashing weapons that kills all those who came near him. Sons of Draupadi armed with bows, struck him. Drona's son uttering loud roar became desirous of slaying them, and rushed towards his enemies. Blocking their attacks with his massive celestial sword, he cut off their abdomen, arm, heads, face, trunk, thighs, ears, shoulders and hips. Then the slayer of Bhishma, viz., Sikhandin struck him with arrow. Filled with rage at this, Drona's son, now possessed of greater might, approached Sikhandin and cut him into twain with his sword. Drona's son then made a heavy carnage amongst that army. Although struck by them, he felt not the pain at that time, as he was blessed by Kapardin. Those men that sought to fly away from the camp for saving their lives, were slain by Kritavarman and Kripa at the gate. They then set fire to the Pandava camp in three places. When the camp was lighted, Aswatthaman, careering, sword in hand, smote his foes with great skill. The earth being drenched with blood, with dust soon disappeared. After the nocturnal slaughter, when all became once more quiet, Aswatthaman issued from it. Having slain all the Panchalas and the sons of Pandavas, they went to the spot of Duryodhana and reported him about his vow fulfillment. After Duryodhana's fall, Sanjaya loses his spiritual sight, given to him by Rishi Vyasa. On the side of the Pandavas, now only eight are alive, and among the Dhartarashtras, only three. The only survivors are those who were not at the camp: the five Pandava brothers, Krishna, Satyaki and Yuyutsu.

=== Aishika Parva (chapters: 10–18) ===
The news of the massacre of sons of Pandavas and all the people who supported Pandavas, shocks Draupadi and Pandava brothers. Yudhishthira laments saying, while being victorious they are vanquished. Draupadi, weeping, says that even after a victory, they have lost almost all of their sons. Then she demands justice with the life of Drona's son Ashwatthama. The Pandavas pursue Aswatthama for justice. Krishna tell them that Aswatthaman knows very high-tier Brahma weapon, which he learned from his father, Drona, and their life is in danger. All followed tracks and found Aswatthaman with Vyasa & other Rishis near Bhagiratha banks. Bhima threatens Asawatthama and seeing himself outnumbered, Drona's son called to his mind that high weapon. Then taking a blade of grass with his left hand, converted it into that powerful celestial weapon, for the destruction of the Pandavas. Arjuna also shoot in that battle same weapon, called Brahmashira, for neutralising his weapon, as per Krishna's words. That weapon, quickly blazed up with terrible flames within a huge sphere of fire. Beholding those two weapons scorching the worlds, the two great Rishis, Narada and Vyasa appears and said that other warriors fallen in battle were also acquainted with great weapons, but they, however, never shot such a weapon upon human beings. They criticized their act of rashness saying that if two great weapons collides, that region suffers a drought for 12 years, even clouds do not pour a drop of water there for that period. At this, Dhananjaya withdrew his weapon, but Aswatthaman failed to retract it. and fell that weapon into the wombs of Pandava women. The holy Krishna snatches Ashwatthama's gem and criticizes Aswatthama's act and curses him to wander over the earth for 3,000 years with diseases, without a companion and without being able to talk with any one. Vyasa too supports Krishna words. Aswatthaman accepts the curse and leaves. Pandavas come back to their encampment and shows Aswatthaman's gem to Draupadi. Then Yudhishthira asks Krishna that how Aswatthaman was able to slay all, alone. Krishna replies that it was because of Shiva's powers.

== English translations ==
Shalya Parva was composed in Sanskrit. Several translations of the book in English are available. Two translations from 19th century, now in public domain, are those by Kisari Mohan Ganguli and Manmatha Nath Dutt. The translations vary with each translator's interpretations.

Clay Sanskrit Library has published a 15-volume set of the Mahabharata which includes a translation of Souptika Parva by Kate Crosby. This translation is modern and uses an old manuscript of the Epic. The translation does not remove verses and chapters now widely believed to be spurious and smuggled into the Epic in 1st or 2nd millennium AD.

Debroy, in 2011, notes that updated critical edition of Shalya Parva, after removing verses and chapters generally accepted so far as spurious and inserted into the original, has 2 parts, 18 adhyayas (chapters) and 771 shlokas (verses).

The entire parva has been "transcreated" and translated in verse by the poet Dr. Purushottama Lal published by Writers Workshop.

== Quotes and teachings ==
Sauptika Parva, Chapter 2:

All men are subjected to and governed by these two forces: Destiny and Exertion (Free will).
There is nothing higher than these two. Our acts do not become successful in consequence of destiny alone, nor of exertion alone;
Success springs from the union of the two.
It is through these two that men are seen to act as also to abstain.

What result is produced by the clouds pouring upon a mountain?
What results are not produced by them pouring upon a cultivated field?
Exertion, where destiny is not auspicious, and absence of exertion where destiny is auspicious, both these are fruitless!
If the rains properly moisten a well-tilled soil, the seed produces great results. Human success is of this nature.

Sometimes, Destiny, having settled a course of events, acts of itself (without waiting for exertion).
The wise, aided by skill have recourse to exertion.
All the purposes of human acts are accomplished by the aid of those two together.
Influenced by these two, men are seen to strive or abstain.
Those among men, that are idle and without intelligence, disapprove of exertion.

— Kripa after losing the war, Sauptika Parva, Mahabharata Book x.2.2-12

== See also ==
- Previous book of Mahabharata: Shalya Parva
- Next book of Mahabharata: Stri Parva
