= Shalya Parva =

Ninth book of the Mahabharata

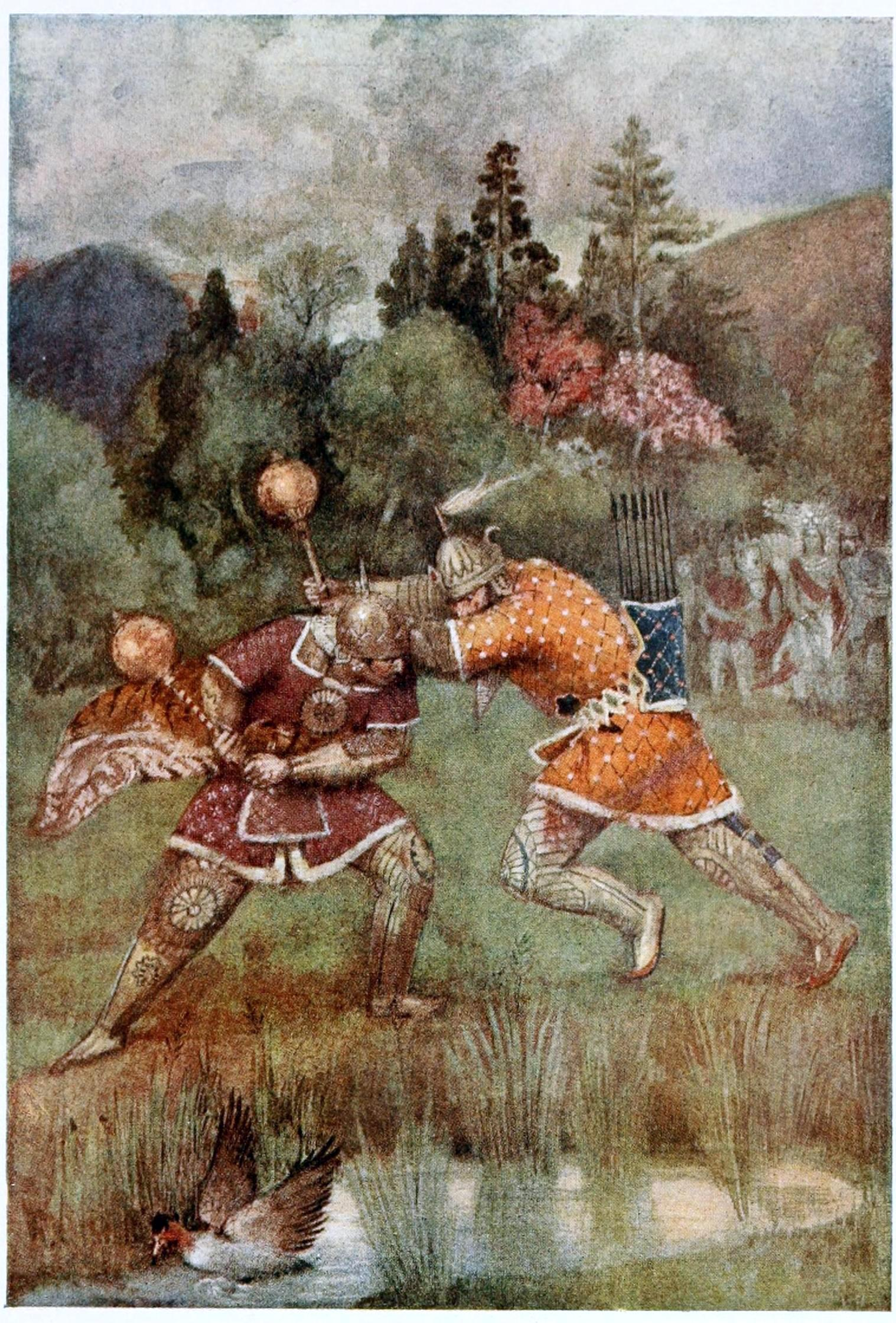
The climax of the Kurukshetra War, featuring the mace duel between Duryodhana and Bhima, is narrated in the Shalya Parva. Illustration by Evelyn Paul

The Shalya Parva (Sanskrit: शल्य पर्व) ("Book of Shalya") is the ninth of the eighteen parvas (books) of the Indian epic Mahabharata. Shalya Parva traditionally has 4 parts and 65 chapters. The critical edition of Shalya Parva has 4 parts and 64 chapters.

Shalya Parva describes the appointment of Shalya as the fourth commander-in-chief of the Kaurava alliance, on the 18th day of the Kurukshetra War. The parva recites Salya's death, how Duryodhana becomes mortally wounded and out of the entire Kaurava army, only 3 survive. Shalya Parva also describes how Pandavas and Krishna are victorious in the war, but lament the enormous toll of the 18-day war on human lives on both sides. The book mentions the anger and hatred among survivors on the Kauravas side, particularly Duryodhana, Aswatthama, Kritavarman and Kripa.

== Structure and chapters ==
The Shalya Parva traditionally has 4 upa-parvas (parts, little books) and 65 adhyayas (chapters). The following are the sub-parvas:

1. Shalya-vadha Parva (chapters: 1–22)
2. Shalya Parva (chapters: 23–27)
3. Hrada-praveca Parva (chapters: 28–29)
4. Gadayuddha Parva (chapters: 30–65)

After three commanders-in-chief of the Kauravas army are slain, Shalya is appointed the leader. He too is killed, as is Shakuni. Millions more soldiers die on the last day of war. Duryodhana, in anguish, leaves the battlefield and goes to a lake. Bhima meets him there and challenges him to a battle. Bhima mortally wounds Duryodhana by crushing his thighs, and later, Duryodhana dies.

Out of 11 Akshauhinis of the Kauravas, the only survivors are mortally injured Duryodhana along with Aswatthama, Kritavarman and Kripa. From Pandavas army, all five brothers, Krishna, 2000 chariots, 700 elephants, 5,000 horsemen and 10,000 foot soldiers survive. Shalya parva describes the war as over with a heavy toll on human lives, Pandavas are victorious, yet a desire for revenge is brewing in Duryodhana, Aswatthama, Kritavarman and Kripa.

== English translations ==
Shalya Parva was composed in Sanskrit. Several translations of the book in English are available. Two translations from 19th century, now in public domain, are those by Kisari Mohan Ganguli and Manmatha Nath Dutt. The translations vary with each translator's interpretations.

Clay Sanskrit Library has published a 15 volume set of the Mahabharata which includes Shalya Parva. This translation is modern, by multiple authors and uses an old manuscript of the epic. The translation does not remove verses and chapters now widely believed to be spurious and smuggled into the epic in 1st or 2nd millennium AD.

Debroy, in 2011, notes that updated critical edition of Shalya Parva, after removing verses and chapters generally accepted so far as spurious and inserted into the original, has 4 parts, 64 adhyayas (chapters) and 3,541 shlokas (verses). Debroy has published a translated version of the critical edition of Shalya Parva in Volume 7 of his series.

The entire parva has been "transcreated" and translated in verse by the poet Dr. Purushottama Lal published by Writers Workshop.

== Quotes and teachings ==
Shalya-vadha Parva, Chapter 1:

Shalya has been killed, as also Shakuni and his son Uluka,
The Samsaptakas, the Kambhojas, the Shakas, the Mlechas, the Mountaineers and the Yavanas have all been killed;
The Easterners, the Southerners, the Northerners and the Westerners, O king, have all been killed,
All the kings and princes have been killed; Duryodhana too have been killed by Pandu's son Bhima,
All the men collected have been destroyed, as also the elephants; all chariot warriors and horsemen have been slain in battle.
Amongst the Pandavas seven are alive, amongst your people just three.

— Sanjaya, Shalya Parva, Mahabharata Book ix.1.22-32

Gadayuddha Parva, Chapter 32:

In difficulty, every one forgets considerations of virtue.

— Yudhishthira, Shalya Parva, Mahabharata Book ix.32.59

Gadayuddha Parva, Chapter 60:

Morality is always followed by the good.
Morality is always followed for two motives:
the desire for Profit, or the desire for Pleasure

Whoever without making distinction between Morality and Profit,
or Morality and Pleasure, or Pleasure and Profit,
follows all three together - Morality, Profit and Pleasure,
always succeeds in obtaining great happiness.

— Balarama, Shalya Parva, Mahabharata Book ix.60.17-19

== See also ==
- Previous book of Mahabharata: Karna Parva
- Next book of Mahabharata: Sauptika Parva
