= Shikhandi =

Character in the Hindu epic Mahabharata

- Mahabharata character
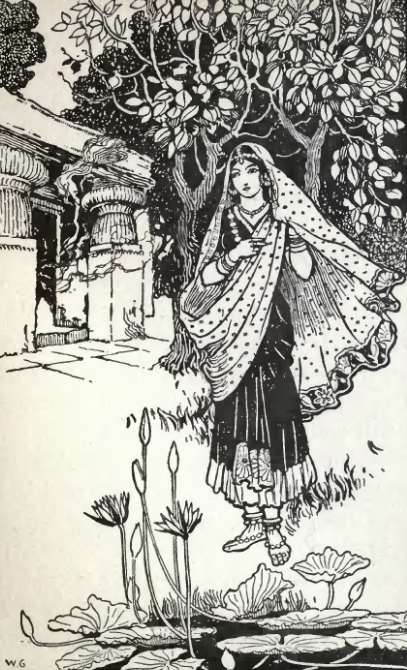
- An illustration of Shikhandi before his sex-change, c. 1916

Information
- Gender: Woman, later Man
- Family: Drupada (father); Prishati (mother); Dhristadyumna (brother); Draupadi (sister)
- Spouse: Unnamed princess of Dasarna
- Children: Kshatradeva
- Home: Panchala Kingdom

Shikhandi (Sanskrit: शिखण्डी, romanized: Śikhaṇḍī), whose natal female identity is rendered Shikhandini, is a character in the Hindu epic Mahabharata. Born as the daughter of Drupada, the King of Panchala, Shikhandini becomes male after agreeing to a sex exchange with a yaksha. He is the brother of Draupadi, who is the common wife of the Pandavas.

Shikhandi is the reincarnation of Amba, a princess who was abducted by Bhishma at a svayamvara and later spurned by him. The prince fights in the Kurukshetra War on the side of his brothers-in-law, the Pandavas, and is instrumental in causing the death of Bhishma. He also engages in combat with great warriors like Ashwatthama, Kripa, and Kritavarma.

== Legend ==
=== Previous birth ===
In the majority of the versions of the Mahabharata, Shikhandi is described as being a princess named Amba in his previous birth. Amba was the eldest daughter of the King of Kashi. Along with her sisters, Ambika and Ambalika, she was won by Bhishma at their svayamvara. After defeating several kings, including King Salva, Bhishma returned to Hastinapura with the princesses, and presented them as brides to his younger half-brother, Vichitravirya, the king.

Before her wedding ceremony could commence, Amba told Bhishma that she had fallen in love with the King of Salva, and was not ready to marry anyone else. Hearing this from her, Bhishma sent Amba with grandeur to her desired husband. However, Salva rejected her, stating that as Bhishma had bested him at the svayamvara, he regarded him to be her rightful husband. Amba returned to Bhishma and demanded that he marry her according to Kshatriya dharma, but Bhishma declined, due to his vow of celibacy. Lamenting her misfortune, the princess decided to retire to the forest and practise austerities for the remainder of her life. As she wandered, she came across an ashrama, and informed the sages within of her plight. One of the sages happened to be maternal grandfather, Hotravahana, who sympathised with her state of mind, and told her that Parashurama, Bhishma's martial guru, would come to her aid. Parashurama visited Hastinapura, and commanded his disciple to marry Amba. Bhishma refused to obey him, once again citing his vow. Furious, Parashurama engaged in a terrible duel against Bhishma on the field of Kurukshetra for twenty-three days, employing astras, but was unable to best him. He regretfully informed Amba of his failure to change his mind. The princess spent twelve years engaged in severe austerities, which scorched the heavens themselves. Shiva appeared to grant her a boon of her choice, and she solicited the death of Bhishma. Shiva told Amba that she would be born as a girl who would later become a man in her next life, and become a maharathi who would slay Bhishma in battle. Overjoyed, the princess lit a funeral pyre, prayed for the death of Bhishma, and self-immolated.

According to an iteration by C. Rajagopalachari, she resorted to a penance and received a garland of blue lotuses from the god Kartikeya, and it was foretold that anyone wearing the garland would become the cause of Bhishma's death. She went to the Panchala, as it were a mighty empire known for its military prowess. However, no one was willing to champion her cause, fearful of antagonising Bhishma. Amba, in anger, hung the garland on the gates of King Drupada and left in agony.

=== Sex exchange ===
Due to his childlessness, King Drupada propitiated Shiva, who told the king that a girl would be born to him, who in due course, would become a man. When Shikhandi was born to Drupada's queen, she was raised and dressed as a boy. When Shikhandi reached the traditional age of maturity, Drupada decided to offer her hand in marriage to the daughter of Hiranyavarman, the King of Dasharna. Shikhandi's wife soon realised that her husband was not a man, and Hiranyavarman soon caught wind of this information. Outraged, he sent a messenger to Drupada to determine the truth, and started preparations for war with the latter. Drupada insisted that Shikhandi was indeed a man. Distressed by her parents' suffering, Shikhandi left the city, deciding to fast to death. She found a forest that humans were terrified to enter, because it was inhabited by a yaksha named Stunakarna. She entered the premises of the yaksha, and started to perform austerities. When Stunakarna enquired regarding her practices, Shikhandi told him her tale. Feeling compassionate, the yaksha offered to exchange his sex with her for a certain period of time, to which Shikhandi agreed. Shikhandi returned to his father as a man, and informed him of this incident. Relieved, Drupada invited Hiranyavarman to send envoys to inspect the manhood of his son. A number of women were dispatched by Hiranyavarman to Drupada, who confirmed Shikhandi's manhood. Thus, the two kings were able to renew their peace.

When Kubera visited Stunakarna's premises, the yaksha did not greet him due to her female form. Angered, Kubera cursed the yaksha, stating that the sex exchange that had been performed would be permanent. When the yaksha begged Kubera to lift the curse, the latter told her that she would regain her birth sex after the death of Shikhandi.

=== Kurukshetra War ===
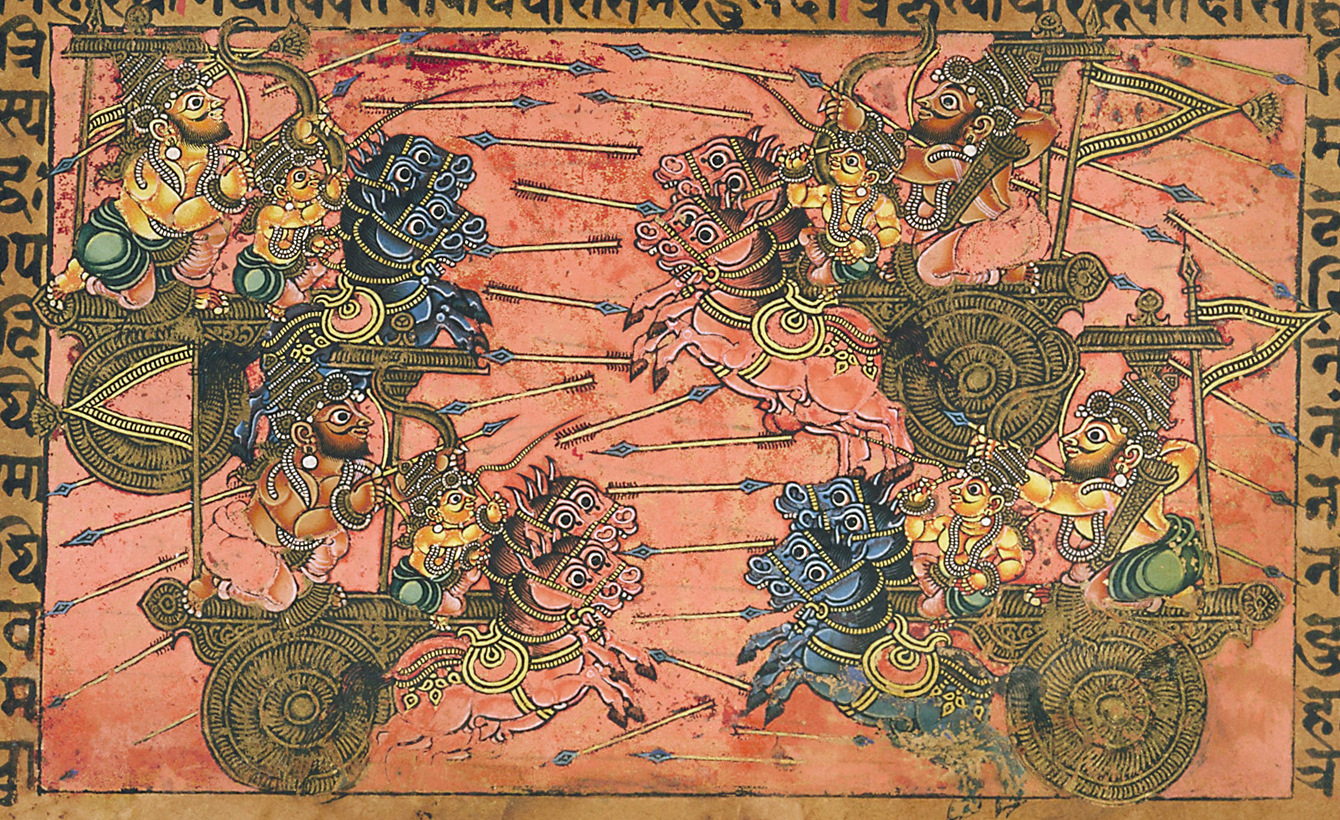
Shikhandi fights Kripa.

Before the Kurukshetra War, Bhima opts for Shikhandi to be the commander-in-chief of the Pandava army, as he was born to kill Bhishma, but Arjuna and Krishna prefer Dhrishtadyumna instead. Shikhandi is made the commander of one of the seven akshauhinis of the Pandava army.

On the first day of the war, Shikhandi confronts Ashwatthama, and both warriors wound each other several times, before withdrawing from the battle. On the seventh day of the war, he confronts Ashwatthama again, and manages to wound him on the forehead. However, an enraged Ashwatthama destroys his chariot, and wounds him badly. Luckily, Satyaki comes to his rescue.

On the night of the ninth day of battle, after a decisive defeat, the Pandavas and Krishna visit Bhishma. Yudhishthira urges the grandsire to tell them how he may be slain, to prevent the devastating loss of Kshatriya lives. Bhishma informs them that it was impossible for him to be vanquished while he wielded arms; However, he would refuse to fight Shikhandi, since he was originally a woman, and Arjuna may vanquish him when he lays down his arms. So, in the next day's fight, Shikhandi rides with Arjuna, placed in the forefront of the Pandava forces. Numerous warriors of the Kaurava army attempt to stop the pair from reaching Bhishma. However, with the assault of the warriors of the Pandava army, Arjuna and Shikhandi push through, and reach Bhishma. Riding behind Shikhandi, Arjuna attacks Bhishma with a devastating volley of hundreds of arrows, the latter is unable to counter, with Shikhandi in the way. Bhishma falls from his chariot and his role in the war ends, giving up his life on the auspicious Uttaryana.

On the twelfth day of the war, Shikhandi's only son, Kshatradeva, is injured by Duryodhana’s son, Lakshmana Kumara. On the night of fourteenth day, Shikhandi is defeated by Kripacharya and is wounded on the sixteenth day, and faints when Kritavarma's arrow pierces his armour. After the death of Shalya, Shikhandi greatly destroys the retreating Kaurava army on the seventeenth day of the war.

Shikhandi, along with the Upapandavas, are killed/injured by Ashwatthama on the 18th day of the war. Dazed, Shikhandi is injured in a sword fight with Ashwatthama when Ashwatthama, Kripacharya, and Kritavarma attacked the Pandava camp at night and later sucumbs to his wounds.

== Other traditions ==
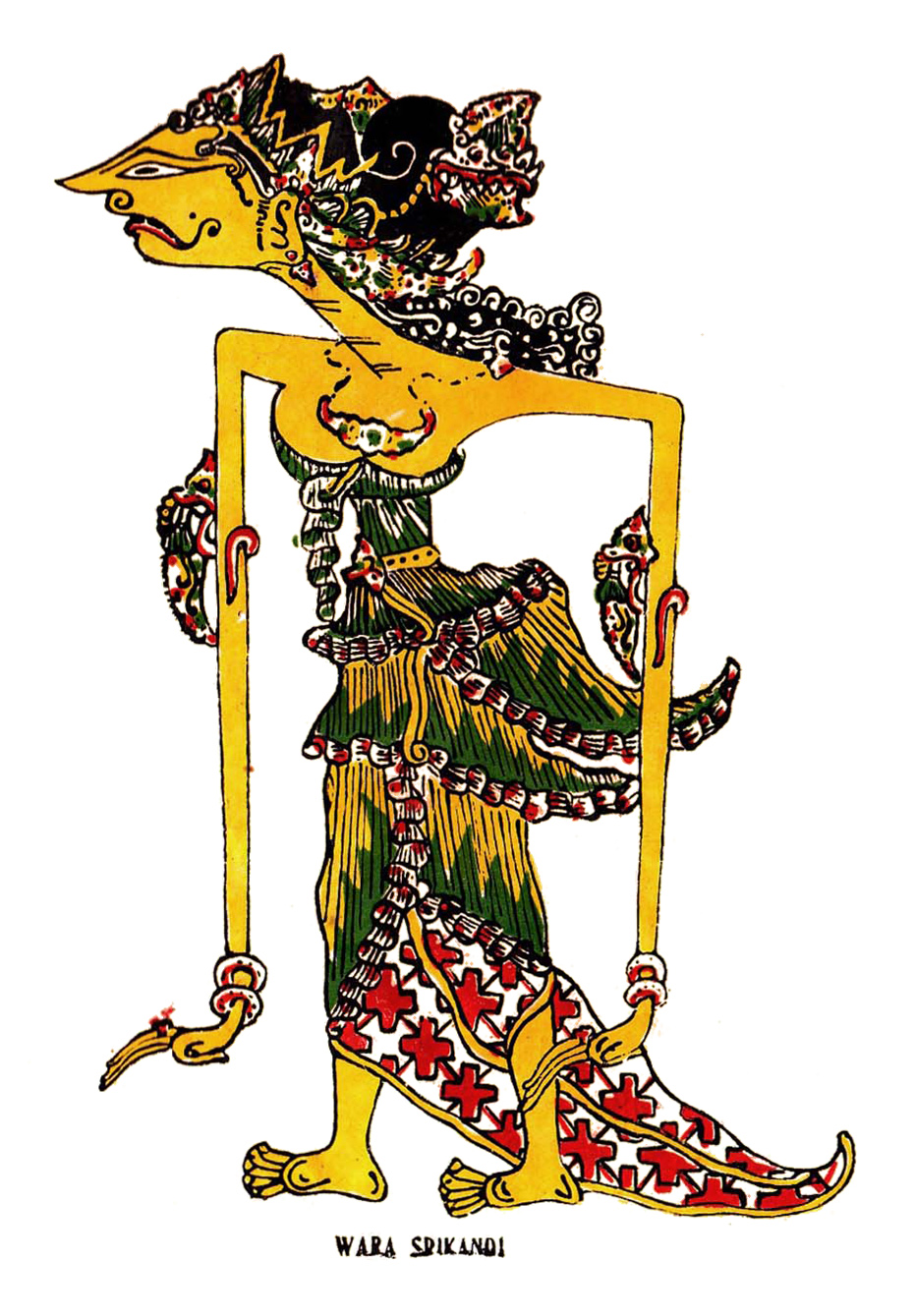
The Javanese Srikandi

In Javanese wayang tradition, Shikhandi is known as Srikandi and remains a woman. She becomes the second wife of the Pandava brother Arjuna, and Sembadra being the first.
