= Kripa =

Guru of the Pandavas and Kauravas in the Hindu epic Mahabharata

- Mahabharata character
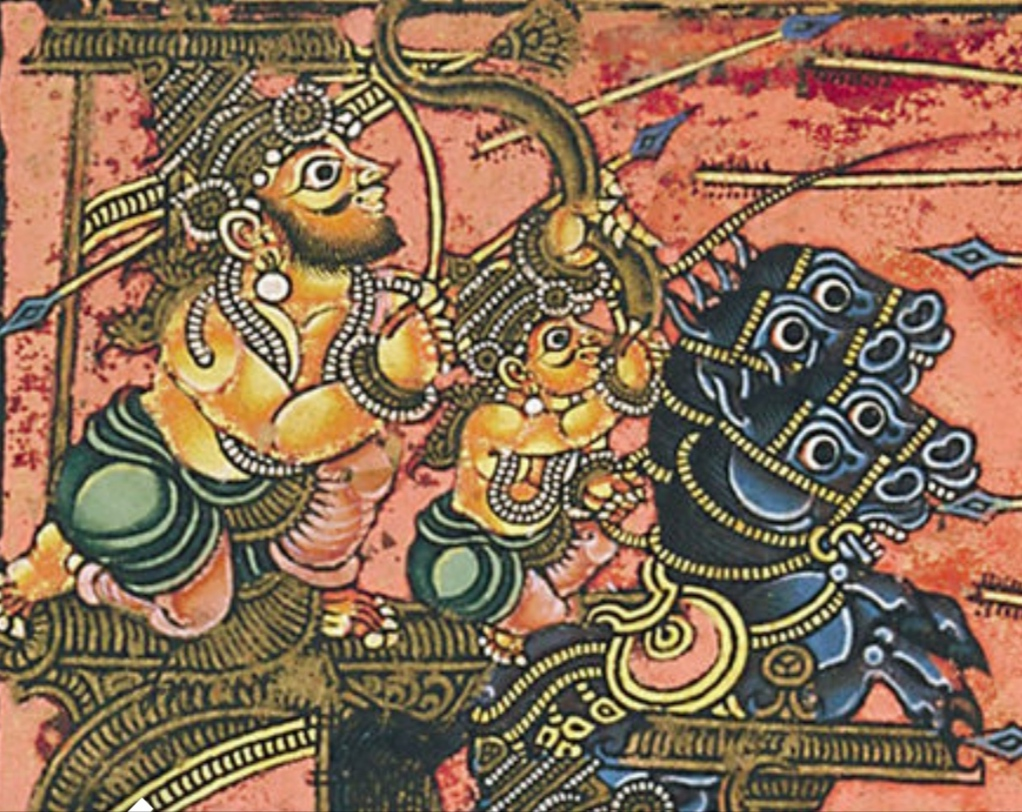
- A manuscript painting of Kripa during Kurukshetra War

Information
- Position: Acharya of Kuru Kingdom
- Affiliation: Kauravas; Chiranjivi
- Weapon: Bow and Arrow
- Family: Sharadvan (father); Janapadi (mother); Shantanu (foster father); Kripi (twin-sister)
- Relatives: Drona (brother-in-law); Ashwatthama (nephew)
- Home: Kuru Kingdom

Kripa (Sanskrit: कृप, lit. 'pity', IAST: Kṛpa), also known as Kripacharya (Sanskrit: कृपाचार्य, IAST: Kṛpācārya), is a figure in Hindu legends. According to the epic Mahabharata, he was a council member of Kuru kingdom and a teacher of the Pandava and Kaurava princes. He is also a teacher of many warriors mentioned in the Mahabharata, including Karna.

Born to warrior-sage Sharadvan and apsara Janapadi in an extraordinary manner, Kripa and his twin-sister Kripi were adopted by King Shantanu of the Kuru Kingdom. Kripa was trained by his birth father and became a great archer like him. Later in the epic, he fought on the Kaurava side against the Pandavas in the Kurukshetra War and was among the three survivors from the Kaurava side, along with Ashwatthama and Kritavarma.

Kripa is a chiranjivi, an immortal destined to live until the end of the Kali Yuga, the last yuga (age). According to some texts, he will also become one of the Saptarishi—the seven revered sages—in the next Manvantara, which is a cyclic period of time in Hindu cosmology.

== Names ==
The Sanskrit word Kripa (Kṛpa) means 'pity' or 'mercy'. According to the Mahabharata (c. 700 BCE – 400 CE), he and his sister were named "Kripa" and "Kripi" as they were adopted by King Shantanu out of pity. Kripa was given the title "acharya" ('master') as he was an expert archer.

In the epic, Kripa is known by many other names including Gautama ('descendant of Gautama'), Sharadvata ('son of Sharadvan'), Sharadvanputra ('son of Sharadvan') and Bharatacharya ('teacher of the descendants of Bharat').

== Birth and upbringing ==
According to the Adi Parva of the Mahabharata, a boy named Sharadvan was born to sage Gautama and his wife Ahalya. Contradictory to this account, some later Puranic scriptures such as Agni Purana mention him as Gautama's great-grandson. Sharadvan showed great passion in archery and as he matured, he became a great archer. He once did penance to become indomitable, but this threatened the devas, especially Indra. He then sent a beautiful apsara (celestial nymph), Janapadi, from heaven to distract the celibate saint. When Sharadvan saw her, he lost his control and ejaculated. Ashamed of his actions, he left his weapons and went deep into a forest. The semen fell on some weeds, dividing the weeds into two parts. A boy and a girl were born from the weeds.

Shantanu, the king of the Kuru kingdom, was hunting, when one of his soldiers spotted the twins and brought them to him. Shantanu became compassionate towards them as he adopted them and returned to his palace. The children were then named Kripa and Kripi. Sharadvan, who was performing tapas in the forest, heard of his children and went to the palace of Kuru. He revealed their identity to the king and taught Kripa the four branches of Dhanurveda (archery). Kripa became a great archer like his father and taught warfare to many warriors and kings.

== Life before the Kurukshetra War ==
The Adi Parva mentions that Kripa taught the Pandavas, Kauravas, Vrishnis and Yadavas about Dhanurveda. Later, the Pandava and Kaurava princes studied under Drona, Kripi's husband who was born to Bharadvaja and apsara Ghritachi in the similar way like her. When the princes' training was over, a test was organised. Karna—the adopted son of a charioteer—challenged Arjuna in an archery match, but Kripa interfered and asked Karna to specify his lineage.

The Sabha Parva of the epic narrates that Kripa participated in the Rajasuya ritual of Yudhishthira, where he distributed dakshina (fees). In the Virata Parva, Kripa helped Duryodhana, the eldest Kaurava, by sending spies to find the Pandavas during their incognito period of exile.

== Kurukshetra War and later life ==
In the Kurukshetra War between the Pandavas and Kauravas, Kripa supported Duryodhana and fought from his side. The Udyoga Parva of the Mahabharata mentions that Bhishma, commander of the Kaurava army, declared Kripa as a mighty warrior. During the war, Kripa fought with many warriors including Brihatkshetra, Chekitana, Satyaki, Sahadeva, Arjuna, Bhima, Dhrishaketu and Vardhakshremi. He also defeated Shikhandi and Yudhamanyu, as well as killed Abhimanyu's guards, Suketu and Kalinda prince. The Shalya Parva mention that Kripa advised Karna to make peace with the Pandavas. On the 18th day of the war, the Kauravas side was defeated and Duryodhana was killed by Bhima. Kripa cried for him and along with Ashwatthama, he massacred the remaining Pandava army during that night and lit the fire at the camp.

The Stri Parva of the epic records Kripa returning to Dhritarashtra and Gandhari, the parents of the Kauravas, and telling them about the war. In the epic's Ashramavasika Parva, when Dhritarashtra decided to retire to the forest, Kripa wanted to accompany him. However, Dhritarashtra stopped him and advised Yudhishthira, the new emperor of Kuru Kingdom, to make Kripa a council member. When the Pandavas also retired to the Himalayas after many years, Kripa became the preceptor of Parikshit, the grandson of Arjuna. It is believed that after fulfilling his duties, Kripa finally went to the forest for penance and lived the rest of his life.

== Legacy ==
In Hinduism, Kripa is described as a Chiranjivi, an "immortal" who will remain alive until the end of the Kali Yuga, the last of the four yugas (age). According to some scriptures, Kripa was blessed with immortality because of his discipline, loyalty and impartial nature.

According to the Vishnu Purana (c. 400 BCE – 900 CE), Kripa will become one of the Saptarishi, the seven most revered sages, in the next Manvantara, which is a cyclic period of time identifying the age of a Manu, the progenitor of mankind, in Hindu cosmology.

== Literature ==
The Sapta Chiranjivi Stotram is a mantra that is featured in Hindu literature:

aśvatthāmā balirvyāsō hanumāṁśca vibhīṣaṇaḥ।
kṛpaḥ paraśurāmaśca saptaitai cirañjīvinaḥ॥
saptaitān saṁsmarēnnityaṁ mārkaṇḍēyamathāṣṭamam।
jīvēdvarṣaśataṁ sopi sarvavyādhivivarjitaḥ॥

— Sapta Chiranjivi Stotram

The mantra states that the remembrance of the eight immortals until end of kalyuga (Ashwatthama, Mahabali, Vyasa, Hanuman, Vibhishana, Kripa, Parashurama, and Markandeya) offers one freedom from ailments and longevity.
