= Bhurishravas =

Historical character

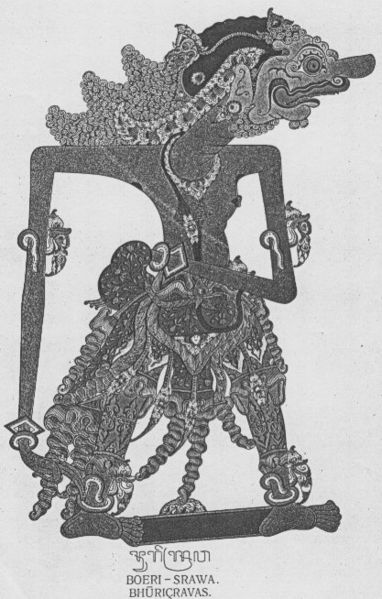

Information
- Family: Somadatta (father) Bhuri, Shala (brothers) another 7 brothers Sudeva (wife of Abhibhu, King of Kashi), Kanakanjali (wife of Vinda, King of Avanti) (sisters) Pratipa and Parjanya (sons) Kumbhaka (daughter)

Bhurishravas (Sanskrit: भूरिश्रवस् / भूरिश्रवा) was a prince of a minor kingdom in the kingdom of Bahlika and played a role in the Mahabharata epic. Bhurishravas has many different spellings, including "Bhoorisravas(a)", "Bhurisravas(a)", "Bhurishravsa", etc.

Bhurishrava was the grandson of King Bahlika, who was the elder brother of Shantanu. He had three children: Pratip, Prayanja and an unnamed daughter.

Bhurishrava's father, Somadatta, once clashed with another prince called Sini. When Devaki, the mother of Lord Krishna, was still unwed, many princes competed for her hand in marriage, including Somadatta and Sini, who fought a great battle over her. Sini, fighting on behalf of Vasudeva won the battle. This incident launched a hatred between the Sini and Somadatta families, leading to a generational rivalry.

The Bhor Saidan village (Hindi: भौर सैदां), named after Bhurishravas is located 22 km from Kurukshetra and 13 km from Thanesar on the Kurukshetra-Pehowa road near Bhureeshwar Temple, is one of the Mahabharata pilgrimage sites in Kurukshetra in the Indian state of Haryana.

== Family lineage ==
Bhurishrava is a Kuru prince, the son of Somadatta and the grandson of Bahlika. Bhurishrava takes part in the Kurukshetra War from the Kaurava side.

Long ago, Sini went to Devaki's Swayamvara and abducted her for the sake of Vasudeva. Somadatta challenged Sini to a duel but lost. Sini seized Somadatta by the hair and kicked him before all the kings, before sparing him alive. Unable to endure the humiliation, Somadatta performed a penance to Lord Shiva and requested that the god give him a mighty son who would avenge his insult. Lord Shiva granted the boon to Somadatta, and consequently, Bhurishravas was born. Due to Somadatta's boon from Lord Shiva, Bhurishravas became a powerful warrior. In battle, he avenged Somadatta's insult by kicking Sini's grandson, Satyaki.

== Role in the war ==
By the time of the Battle of Kurukshetra, Sini's grandson Satyaki, by then a king of the Siwa kingdom, is a commander in the Pandava army while Bhurishravas is one of the eleven commanders of the Kaurava army.

On the 14th day of the battle, Bhurishravas is stationed in Dronacharya's formation, attempting to stop Arjuna from reaching Jayadratha. As Satyaki and Bhima come to support Arjuna, Bhurishravas abandons his position and challenges Satyaki. Already tired from battling Drona and navigating his formation, Satyaki begins to falter after a long and bloody battle. Their weapons destroyed, the fighting turns to hand-to-hand combat. Bhurishravas pummels Satyaki and drags him across the battlefield.

Arjuna is alerted to Satyaki's danger by Krishna. Just as Bhurishravas is preparing to kill Satyaki, Arjuna comes to the rescue, shooting an arrow cutting off Bhurishravas's arm. Bhurishravas wails that by striking him from behind and without a formal challenge, Arjuna has disgraced the honor between warriors.

At this point, laying down his weapons, he begins to meditate yoga. But Satyaki then emerges from his swoon and swiftly decapitates his enemy. Warriors on both sides of the battle condemn Satyaki for this act - one of the incidents in the epic showing the superiority of dharma and honor against the uncontrollable power of hatred.

Symbolically, as Bhurishravas's attempts to kill the unarmed Satyaki immediately result in his own death in the same manner, Bhurishravas can be seen as representing the binding effects of one's material actions (karma).

Years later, Bhurishravas's death would be used by Kritavarma to insult Satyaki. In the resulting fight, Satyaki (as well as the remaining Yadavas) perishes.

== Descendants ==
Bhurishravas's two sons Pratipa and Parjanya are killed by Abhimanyu. His daughter Kumbhaka marries Drupada's son Satyajit and has two sons after the war; the first becomes a sage and married Pragati,(daughter of Draupadi and Arjun) while the second son marries Pratip's daughter and inherits the Bahlika throne.
