= Drupada =

Panchala King in the Indian epic Mahabharata

- Mahabharata character
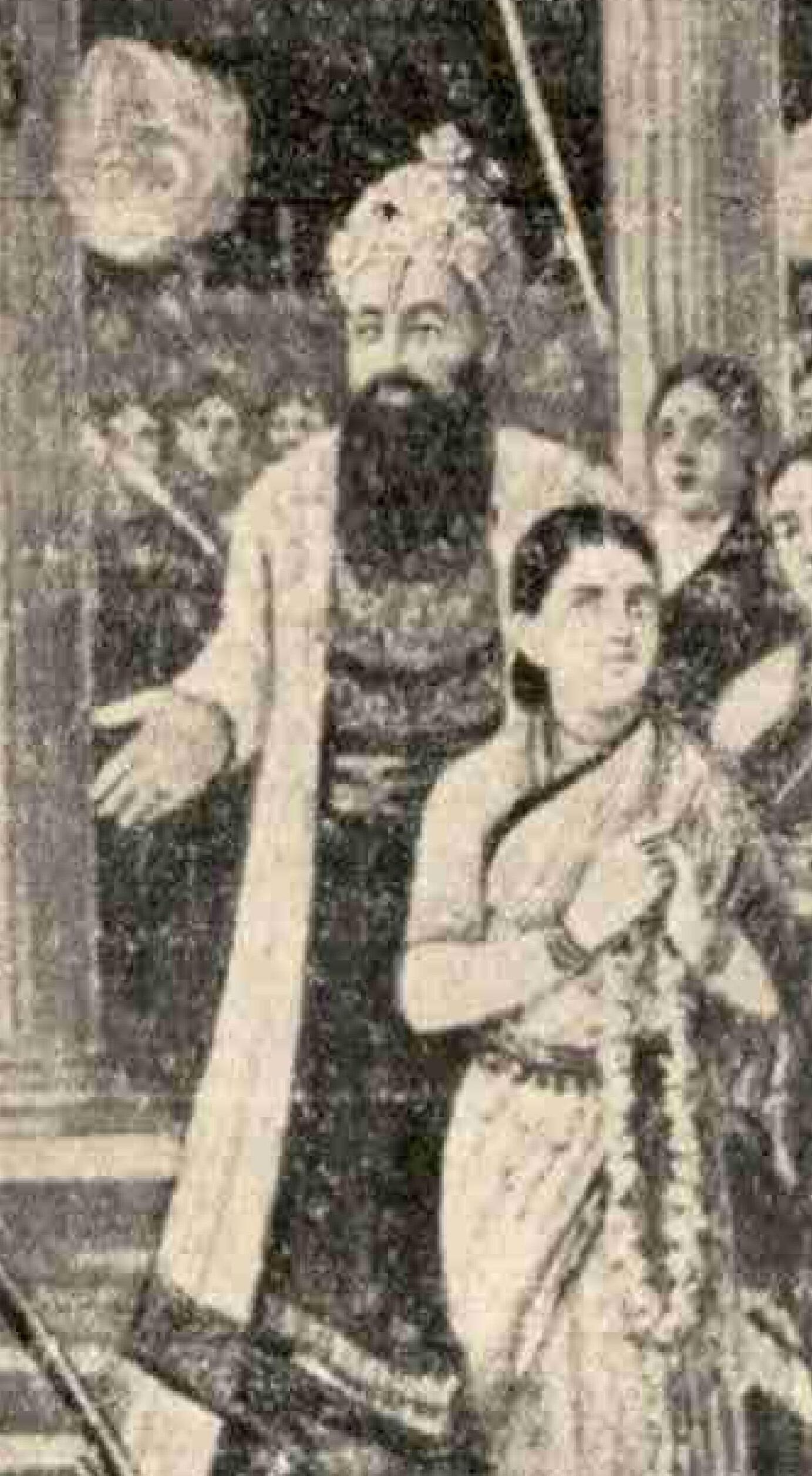
- Drupada at the svayamvara ceremony of Draupadi, 20th-century illustration

Information
- Position: King of Panchala
- Affiliation: Pandavas
- Weapon: Gada; Bow and Arrow
- Family: Prishata (father); Suchitra (brother)
- Spouse: Prishati (chief queen)
- Children: Dhrishtadyumna, Shikhandi, Satyajit, Uttamaujas, Yudhamanyu and 6 other sons; Draupadi (daughter)
- Home: Panchala Kingdom

Drupada (Sanskrit: द्रुपद, lit. 'firm footed or pillar'), also known as Yajnasena (Sanskrit: यज्ञसेन, lit. 'he whose army is sacrificial', IAST: Yajñasena), is the king of Panchala Kingdom, in the Hindu epic Mahabharata. He is the father of Draupadi, the epic's heroine. In the Kurukshetra War as the head of 1 akshauhini army, Drupada fought from the side of his sons-in-law, the Pandavas, and was killed by his childhood friend and rival, Drona.

== Early life and family ==
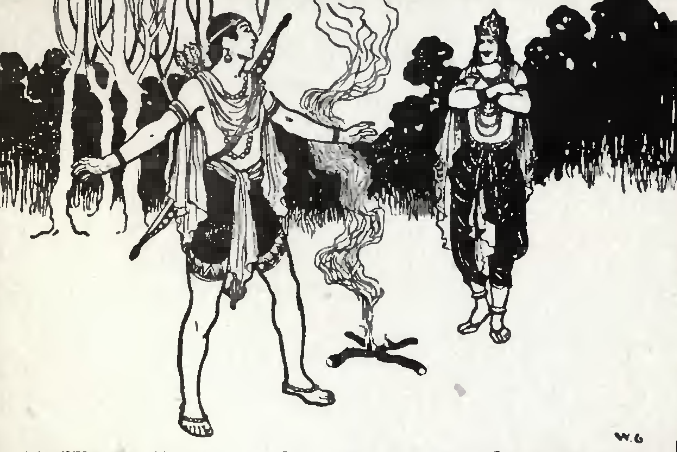
An illustration depicting a young Drupada (right) with Drona

According to the Mahabharata, Drupada is the son of Prishata, the king of Panchala Kingdom and his birth name was Yajnasena. Some Puranic scriptures provide a contradictory genealogy, according to which Drupada is the son of Somaka and Prishata is Somaka’s great grandfather.

Drupada's early life is narrated in the Adi Parva of the epic, according to which he goes to the hermitage of the sage Bharadvaja for education and befriends Drona, his classmate and Bhardwaja's son. Drupada assures Drona that once he becomes the king, he would share half of his kingdom with Drona. After completing his education, Drupada returns to Panchala and becomes its king after Prishata's death.

The wife of Drupada is addressed as Prishati (lit. 'daughter-in-law of Prishata') in the Mahabharata. The Ambaopakhyana episode in the Udyoga Parva (the fifth book of the Mahabharata) reveals that Drupada remains childless for a long time, until he pleases the god Shiva with severe austerities. As a result, he fathers his first child, Shikhandini, who is born female but raised as a male on Shiva’s instructions. Drupada later arranges Shikhandini’s marriage to a princess of Dasarna, but when her identity is discovered, the king of Dasarna declares war on Drupada—until Shikhandini changes sex with the help of a yaksha and becomes the male Shikhandi.

Other than Shikhandi, Drupada is also the father of Uttamaujas and Yudhamanyu, the two princes who protected the hero Arjuna during the Kurukshetra War. The Critical Edition mentions that Drupada has eleven sons, naming in addition to the aforementioned children: Satyajita, Kumara, Vrika, Panchalya, Suratha, Shatrunjaya and Janmejaya.

== Kingship ==
Drupada becomes the king of Panchala after the death of Prishata. According to the Adi Parva of the epic, his capital was known as Kampilya. Meanwhile, Drona lives a life of poverty but after his son, Ashvatthama, is teased for being so poor that he is unable to afford milk, he approaches Drupada for help. Drupada, now conscious of the difference of status between them, refuses to acknowledge their friendship and shuns Drona, and calls him a beggar.

"O Brahmana (Drona), thy intelligence is scarcely of a high order, inasmuch as thou sayest unto me, all on a sudden, that thou art my friend! O thou of dull apprehension, great kings can never be friends with such luckless and indigent wights as thou! It is true there had been friendship between thee and me before, for we were then both equally circumstanced. But Time that impaireth everything in its course, impaireth friendship also. In this world, friendship never endureth for ever in any heart. Time weareth it off and anger destroyeth it too. Do not stick, therefore, to that worn-off friendship. Think not of it any longer. The friendship I had with thee, O first of Brahmanas, was for a particular purpose. Friendship can never subsist between a poor man and a rich man, between a man of letters and an unlettered mind, between a hero and a coward. Why dost thou desire the continuance of our former friendship? There may be friendship or hostility between persons equally situated as to wealth or might. The indigent and the affluent can neither be friends nor quarrel with each other. One of impure birth can never be a friend to one of pure birth; one who is not a car-warrior can never be a friend to one who is so; and one who is not a king never have a king for his friend. Therefore, why dost thou desire the continuance of our former friendship?"

— Drupada (Mahabharata, Adi Parva, Section CXXXII)

Drona becomes infuriated and vows to avenge the insult. After leaving the palace, he wanders about in search of disciples who are capable of confronting Drupada. He is later employed by Bhishma to train the Kuru princes—the Pandava brothers and the Kaurava brothers. After their military education ends, Drona asks them to defeat and capture Drupada as his gurudakshina (fees). The princes attack Drupada, but the latter is able to defeat all the Kauravas. Then the Pandavas, led by Arjuna, capture Drupada, binding him in ropes and bringing him to Drona. Upon Drupada's request, Drona agrees to maintain friendly relations in future. He is set free, but the country of Panchala is divided into two parts, giving its one part to Drupada, and the other part to Drona.

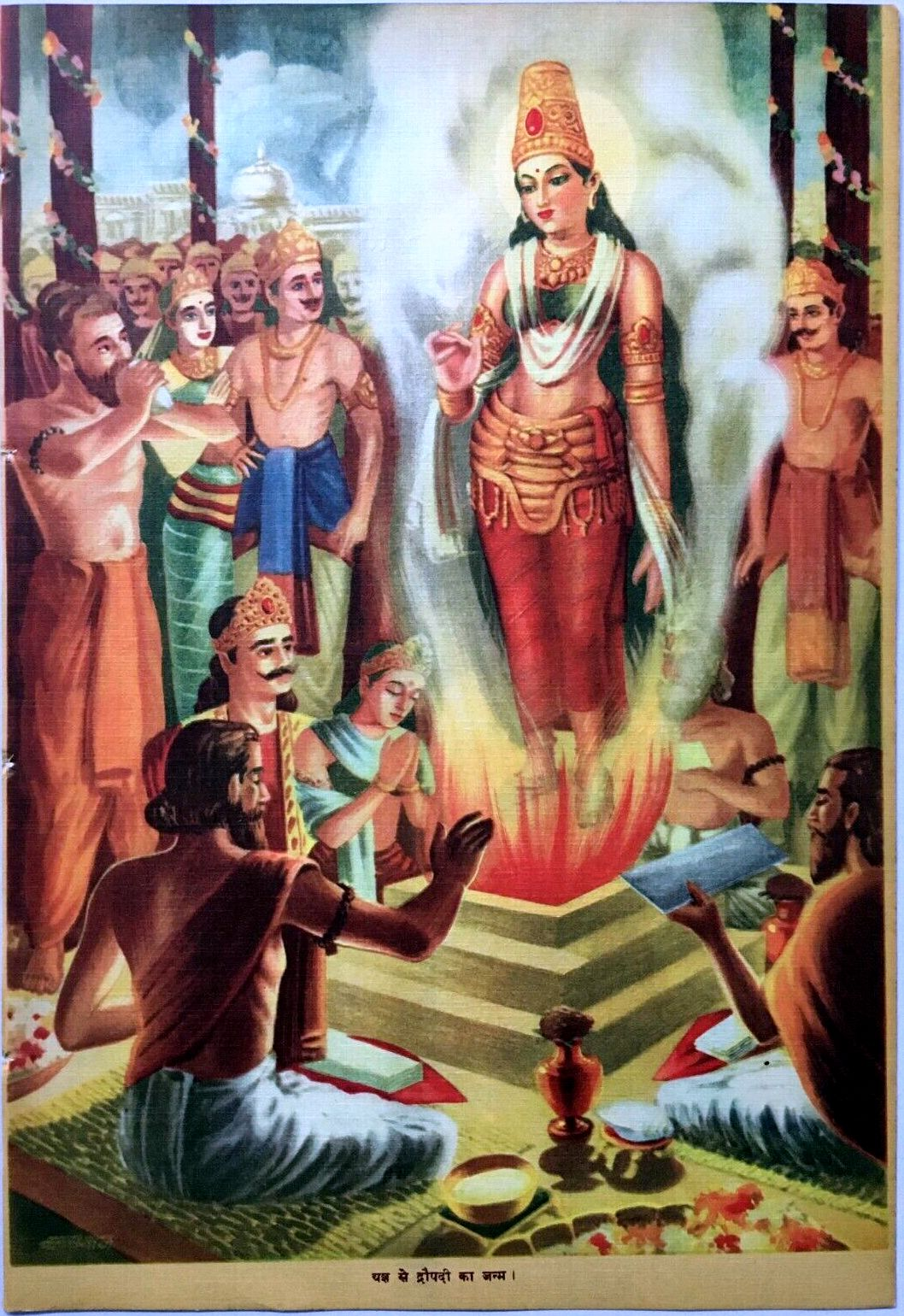
A 1940s print depicting the birth of Draupadi from the yajna; Drupada (seated near the altar with his wife) celebrates her birth.

Though both the kingdoms are on friendly terms, Drupada does not forget his insult at the hands of Drona. Realising that neither he nor his children are capable enough to defeat Drona, Drupada desires to have a son powerful enough to take revenge on Drona. He consults several seers and eventually approaches Yaja and Upayaja, two sage brothers, to help him obtain a powerful son. Initially they refuse, but after Drupada serves them for a year, they agree to perform a yajna (fire-sacrifice). After its completion, they instruct Prishati—the wife of Drupada—to consume the sacrificial offering, but she refuses as she had saffron paste in her mouth and asks them to wait till she washed herself. Criticising her untimely request, Yaja pours the offering into the altar of the sacrifice. A boy and a girl emerge from it, who accept Drupada and Prishati as their parents. They are named Dhrishtadyumna and Krishnā (Draupadi) respectively, and their birth is followed by divine prophecy that Dhrishtadyumna would kill Drona and Draupadi would bring the end of the Kauravas.

== Svayamvara of Draupadi ==
Drupada, being earlier defeated by Arjuna, is greatly impressed by his skills and intends to wed him to Draupadi. However, at this time the Pandavas are thought to be dead after the burning of Lakshagraha, so he arranges a svayamvara (self-choice ceremony) for Draupadi to choose her husband. To win Draupadi's hand, the participants have to string an enormous bow and shoot an arrow through the eye of a revolving fish while looking into its reflection in the water. All the kings including Shalya, Jarasandha, Karna, and Duryodhana fail to even string the bow. However Karna's participation is a subject to debate as in some renditions it is said that Draupadi refused to marry Karna and did not allow him to participate on the account of him being the son of a suta. The Pandavas, disguised as brahmins, are present at the svayamvara and with no other prince left to participate, Arjuna completes the task. With Arjuna's identity unknown to him, Drupada reluctantly gives his permission, but is attacked by other kings for humiliating them by giving Draupadi to a brahmin. Arjuna then saves him and takes Draupadi with him. When the brothers and Draupadi are about to greet their mother Kunti, they decide to play a prank on her by announcing that they had brought some alms. Kunti asks her sons to share whatever had been brought. The imperative of acting on their mother's words and the propriety of marriage to five husbands is discussed at Drupada's palace, with Drupada and Dhristadyumna fiercely opposed to Draupadi marrying anyone other than Arjuna. However, sage Vyasa and Lord Krishna support Kunti's proposal and sanction the marriage, assuaging Drupada's fears.

== Role in Kurukshetra War ==
Drupada fights on the side of the Pandavas in the Kurukshetra War. Bhishma names him a Maharathi. On the first day, he fights Jayadaratha. After a long drawn duel, Drupada is finally defeated and flees. During the night of the 14th day, he is defeated by Vrishasena and is rendered unconscious. After he is taken away, Vrishasena massacres most of his army as well. He along with Virata fought and were killed by Drona on the 15th day of the war. He was badly injured and killed by Drona after a long sword fight. After his death, Drona salutes his body saying with tears in his eyes that he had to kill his friend.

== See also ==
- Characters in the Mahabharata
