= Sathyajith =

Sathyajith may refer to:

- Sathyajith (Kannada actor) (1949–2021)
- Sathyajith (Tamil actor)

== See also ==
- Satyajit, a given name
