= Uttamaujas and Yudhamanyu =

Characters in the Hindu epic Mahabharata

Uttamauja (Sanskrit: उत्तमौजस्) and Yudhamanyu (Sanskrit: युधामन्यु) are two brothers from the Panchala kingdom featured in the Hindu epic Mahabharata. In some versions of the epic, they were the sons of Panchala king Drupada and thus the brothers of Draupadi. During the Kurukshetra War, they became the bodyguards of Arjuna and fought a battle against Duryodhana.

== Legend ==
The names of Uttamaujas and his brother Yudhamanyu are princes of Panchala.

Once, Uttamaujas and his brother Yudhamanyu while Duryodhana was giving a list of twenty great and important charioteers (Maharathis) that were taking part in the war on behalf of the Pandavas According to the Mahabharata, they were brothers and princes from the royal clan of the Panchalas. The name of the king of Southern Panchala, at that time, was Drupada. Their role and duties are mentioned at various places in the Mahabharata. Both were engaged as body guards of Arjuna initially. Yudhamanyu was deployed as the protector of the left wheel of the chariot of Arjuna, while Uttamaujas was posted as the protector of the right wheel. Later they were asked to protect the chariot at the rear.

On their way to meet Arjuna, they were stopped by King Duryodhana and engaged in a fierce battle.

== Battle ==
At the time of the Chakravyuha (formation like a wheel), the two Panchala brothers wanted to meet Arjuna who was away from the battlefield and apprise him of the grave situation. As they could not pierce the Chakravyuha, they tried to bypass the Kuru army. Duryodhana observed them and engaged them in battle. The brothers attacked Duryodhana with twenty arrows, and his horses with four more. Duryodhana demolished Yudhamanyu's standard with a single arrow, his bow with another arrow and finally felled Yudhamanyu's charioteer with a wedge headed arrow, stunning but not killing him. Uttamaujas killed Duryodhana's charioteer with gold embellished arrows. In retaliation, Duryodhana killed the four horses of Uttamaujas' chariot and also killed his two charioteers. Uttamaujas jumped from his now useless chariot and clambered into his brother's chariot. Seeing that Duryodhana was marching towards them with his gada (mace), both the brothers jumped out of their chariot and drove away in two other chariots to meet Arjuna. During the Kurukshetra war, Uttamaujas fought many great warriors of the enemy camp such as Drona, Ashwatthama, Kritavarma, Duryodhana, Karna, and Kripa.

They accompanied the Pandavas when they went in search of Duryodhana who was hiding in a lake. They were brutally murdered by Ashwatthama at midnight after the war ended on the eighteenth day, while they were sleeping in the Pandava camp. Yudhisthira cremated them along with the dead warriors of both the camps.

Fierce encounter with Kritavarman: A great battle took place between Kritavarman and the two Panchala brothers when they tried to follow the Chariot of Arjuna so as to protect his chariot wheels. This battle took place when Arjuna tried to pierce the Cambhoja division, which was standing in his way obstructing his progress towards Jayadratha the king of Sindhu Kingdom. Arjuna who was burning with anger like the mid-day sun stalled Kritavarman and entered the Cambhoja division. Kritavarman was not able to stop the progress of Arjuna. But he stood in the way of his two guards Uttamaujas and Yudhamanyu who tried to follow Arjuna. Though Arjuna out of respect towards Kritavarma did not kill the elderly man, the two brothers had no such compunctions. Kritavarma wanted to teach a lesson to the two brothers. He encountered the two Panchala princes as they advanced to follow Arjuna’s chariot, to protect his chariot wheels on either side. But Kritavarma the ruler of the Bhojas pierced them both with sharp arrows striking both with three and four arrows on each respectively. These two princes in return pierced him with ten arrows each. Again each of them sent three arrows. Uttamaujas shooting three arrows cut off Kritavarma’s standard and bow. Then Kritavarma the son of Hridika taking up another bow and becoming infuriated with rage deprived both these warriors of their bows and covered them with a rain of arrows. Then the two warriors taking up and stringing two new bows began to pierce Kritavarman. But these two princes were successfully resisted by Kritavarman and as such they could obtain no admission into the Cambhoja division to catch up with Arjuna, although those two bulls among men struggled vigorously.
