= Satyajit =

Indian male given name

Satyajit is a common Indian name. The word is a compound of the words for truthful (Satya), and winner (jit).

Some noted personalities with the name Satyajit are:

- Satyajit Bhatkal - Indian television and film director, creator of Satyamev Jayate
- Satyajit Boolell - former Director of Public Prosecutions
- Satyajit Chatterjee - former soccer player and coach
- Satyajit Mayor - Indian biologist who serves as director of the National Centre for Biological Sciences, Bangalore
- Satyajit Ray (1921–1992) - Indian filmmaker
- Satyajit Sharma - Indian film and television actor
- Satyajit Gadnis - Indian pianist and tabla player based in Singapore

== See also ==
- Sathyajith
