= Satyaki =

Vrishni warrior mentioned in Hindu texts

- Krishna as envoy by Raja Ravi Varma; Satyaki (dressed in white, standing near Krishna) is shown taking out his sword in response to the insults made by Duryodhana (left) to Krishna
- Other names: Yuyudhana
- Texts: Mahabharata

Genealogy
- Parents: Satyaka (father)
- Children: Jaya
- Dynasty: Yaduvamsha

Yuyudhana (Sanskrit: युयुधान, IAST: Yuyudhāna), better known as Satyaki (Sanskrit: सात्यकि, IAST: Sātyaki), was a powerful Yadava chieftain of Narayani Sena, belonging to the Vrishni clan to which Krishna also belonged. According to the Puranas, he was the grandson of Shini of the Vrishni clan, and son of Satyaka, after whom he was named. A valiant warrior, Satyaki was devoted to Krishna and was a student of Arjuna.

== Kurukshetra War ==
Satyaki supported the Pandavas against the Kauravas in the Kurukshetra War. He traveled with Krishna to the Kuru capital as part of the peace mission and later joined the Pandavas with troops from the Vrishnis and Sivis. While Satyaki fought for the Pandavas, other Yadavas under Kritavarma supported the Kauravas after Krishna gave his army to Duryodha.Traditions hold that Satyaki brought one akshauhini army and that Bhishma rated him able to face twelve atirathis alone. During the war, Satyaki is the commander of one akshauhini of the Pandava army.

=== 2nd day ===
On the 2nd day of the war, Satyaki fought with Shakuni. Shakuni gave him a fierce battle. But Satyaki defeated him.

=== 14th day ===
The fourteenth day of the battle features Satyaki in a prominent role. With Arjuna attempting to pierce Drona's formation in order to fulfill his oath of killing Jayadratha, Satyaki defends Yudhishthira from Drona, who was attempting to capture the emperor in Arjuna's absence. Rescuing Dhristadyumna from Drona, Satyaki engages in a long fight with Drona, taking up the morning's fight. Drona gets so frustrated by Satyaki, that he even uses divine weapons, which Satyaki counters using his knowledge of divine weapons from his education under Arjuna. Eventually, Satyaki tires, and he is wounded by Drona's arrows. He is rescued by a new attack from the Upapandavas. Ultimately, Satyaki manages to stall Drona long enough that Duryodhana, frustrated with Drona's lack of progress, withdraws Drona to focus on the conflict with Arjuna.

Later in the day, Yudhishthira gets worried for Arjuna's safety. Despite his protests that protecting the king is more important, Satyaki is ordered to find and aid Arjuna. At the entrance to the Padmavyuha, he meets Drona. Knowing that he cannot bypass the sage, he circumvents him, telling Drona that he must duplicate the actions of his guru (as Arjuna had declined to fight Drona at the start of the day).

==== Conflict with Bhurisrava ====
As Arjuna is being attacked from multiple sides, Satyaki appears to give aid. Satyaki fights an intense battle with archrival, Bhurisravas with whom he had a long-standing family feud, following from when Satyaki's grandfather defeated Bhurishrava's father. After a long and bloody battle, Satyaki, already exhausted from fighting Drona, begins to falter, and Bhurisravas pummels him and drags him across the battlefield. Raising his sword, Bhurisravas prepares to kill Satyaki, but he is rescued from death by Arjuna, who shoots an arrow severing Bhurisravas's arm. When criticized by Bhurisravas for interfering in the fight without warning. Bhurisravas lays out his weapons and sits down in meditation. Satyaki then emerges from his swoon and swiftly decapitates his enemy. He is condemned for this rash act, but Satyaki states that the moment Bhurisravas struck his semiconscious body, he had sworn that he would kill Bhurisravas. With the day's battle nearly over and Jayadratha still far away, the debate on the morality of Satyaki's actions is shelved.

==== Night War ====
When the battle on the fourteenth day continued into the night killed Bhurisravas's father Somadatta, later assisting Bhima slay Somadatta's father, Bahlika.

== Yadava Warrior ==
In the Kurukshetra war, Satyaki and Kritavarma were two important Yadava heroes who fought on the opposing sides. Satyaki fought on the side of the Pandavas, whereas Kritavarma joined the Kauravas. Satyaki is also noted as an Ayurvedic physician who was an expert in Shalya (surgery) and Shalakya (Eye/ENT). He is mentioned by Dalhana in Timir and Annantvat (Sushruta Uttartantra) and by Chakrapani in Netraroga (Charak). Some Mahabharat text says that during Mausala Parva, Satyaki killed Kritavarma by beheading him.

== Death ==
After the Kurukshetra war, Gandhari curses Krishna that his clan will be destroyed 36 years later in a fratricidal massacre.

During the 36th year, the Yadavas retire to Prabhāsa where they are allotted temporary residences and start reveling and drinking. Inebriated, Satyaki laughs at and taunts Kritavarma for his actions on the night of the 18th day of battle. As others agree with Satyaki, Kritavarma becomes enraged and lambasts Satyaki for slaying Bhurishravas in cold blood. Countering this, Satyaki narrates the story of Kritavarma plotting to kill Devaki's father. Warriors start taking sides depending on who their clans had fought for during the war; wine flows and tempers flare. Enraged, Satyaki gets up from the ground, and to his shock he discovers that the grass he pulls up from his clenched hands has turned into weapons (thanks to a rishi's curse). Red-faced, Satyaki decapitates Kritavarma and begins assaulting the warriors who are on Kritavarma's side. The Bhojas and the Andhakas, incensed and drunk, surround Satyaki as Krishna comes to his aid. However, knowing the character of the hour, Krishna stands aside. The Bhojas and Andhakas pull their own weapons from the ground and advance towards Satyaki.

Satyaki's allies, like Pradyumna rush to his defense. In the end, Satyaki lies dead, as do all the Vrishini warriors.

== Descendants ==
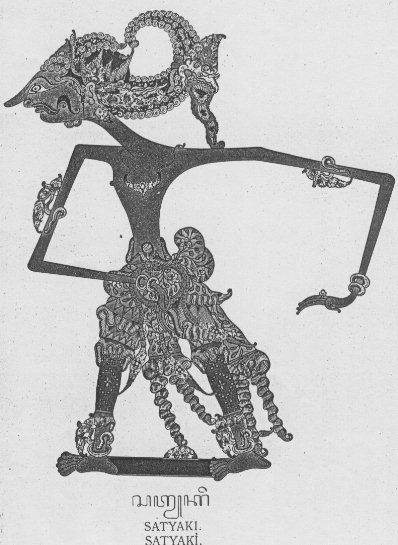
Satyaki in Javanese Wayang (Javanese shadow puppet). The picture above is a puppet form of Satyaki and does not resemble the actual character.

In other versions, Satyaki has a single son Asanga with one mentioned grandson Yugandhara. Yugandhara later became the ruler of the territory near the Sarasvati River. There is also mention of two granddaughters Satyaki's hopes to marry into the Pandava's family.

The latter day Yaudheyas claimed themselves as sons of Dharmaraja and nephews of Arjun and claimed descent either through son of Satyaki or through the son of Yudhishthira, Yaudheya (mentioned in Matsaya Purana).

== See also ==
- Narayani Sena
- Yadava
- Vrishni
- Historicity of the Mahabharata
