= Kritavarma =

Mahabharata character

- Texts: Mahabharata, Puranas

Genealogy
- Parents: Hridika (father)
- Siblings: Devavāha, Gadādhanvan, and Śūra
- Dynasty: Yaduvamsha

Kritavarma (Sanskrit: कृतवर्मा, IAST: Kṛtavarmā) is a warrior from the Yaduvamsha in Hindu mythology. He appears as a minor character in the Mahabharata, fighting in the Kurukshetra war for the Kauravas. He was the son of Hṛidika, born in the Andhaka clan of the Yadu dynasty.

== Legend ==
=== Syamantaka theft ===
Kritavarma was the commander of the Narayani sena or Gopa sena. Kritavarma is said to have encouraged, or in some accounts, participated in the theft of the legendary Syamantaka jewel from King Satrajit. Along with his friend Akrura, he is said to have caused Shatadhanva to murder Satrajit, and steal the jewel for himself. Shatadhanva was subsequently slain by Krishna, though he no longer had the jewel, having given it to Akrura and Kritavarma for safekeeping. When a famine broke out in Dvaraka, or in other accounts, due to the discovery of Akrura's possession of the Syamantaka, both Kritavarma and he were summoned to the city to hand over the jewel. In the end, Krishna decided that Akrura should keep the jewel with him.

=== Kurukshetra war ===
Kritavarma chose the Kaurava side in the Kurukshetra War when his assistance was sought by Duryodhana, promising to lend him one akshauhini.

On the first day of the war, he fought a duel with Satyaki. As a maharathi, was placed at the head of the flying-heron formation that had been set up by Bhishma. He engaged in a number of conflicts throughout the war. He was defeated by Bhima in single combat, and wounded in another bout against Satyaki. He fought a duel against Dhristadyumna, and one against Arjuna, Bhima, and Satyaki. He attacked Abhimanyu, killing his horse. After fainting in a bout against Arjuna, he met Yudhumanyu and Uttamaujas in combat. He defeated Shikhandi, Bhima, and Yudhishthira on various occasions. He fled the battlefield after the death of Drona. He participated in Ashwatthama's vendetta against the Pandavas by setting fire to their camp while their warriors slept. After the war, he informed Dhritarashtra regarding the death of his son, Duryodhana, and returned home. He appeared at Yudhishthira's ashvamedha sacrifice.

=== Yadu massacre ===
The conflict between Kritavarma and Satyaki in the Mausala Parva is the inciting event for the Yadu massacre, that results in the destruction of the majority of the Yadu race at Prabhasa. Inebriated due to the consumption of wine, Satyaki is stated to have mocked the Kshatriya birth of Kritavarma for the immoral murder of the warriors of the Pandava camp while they slept, believing that he would never be forgiven for this act. In retort, Kritavarma accused Satyaki of unheroic conduct when the latter attacked Bhurisharavas when he had laid down his arms. Satyaki countered by reminding him of his unrighteous role in taking the Syamantaka jewel from Satrajit. Observing Satyabhama's grief, Satyaki promised her vengeance, and immediately beheaded Kritavarma. The clans of the Bhojas and the Andhakas started to fight each other, beginning the Yadu massacre.

== See also ==
- Ashwatthama
- Satyaki
- Shikhandi
