= Kurukshetra War =

War described in the Hindu epic Mahabharata

Kurukshetra War The Great War of Mahabharata
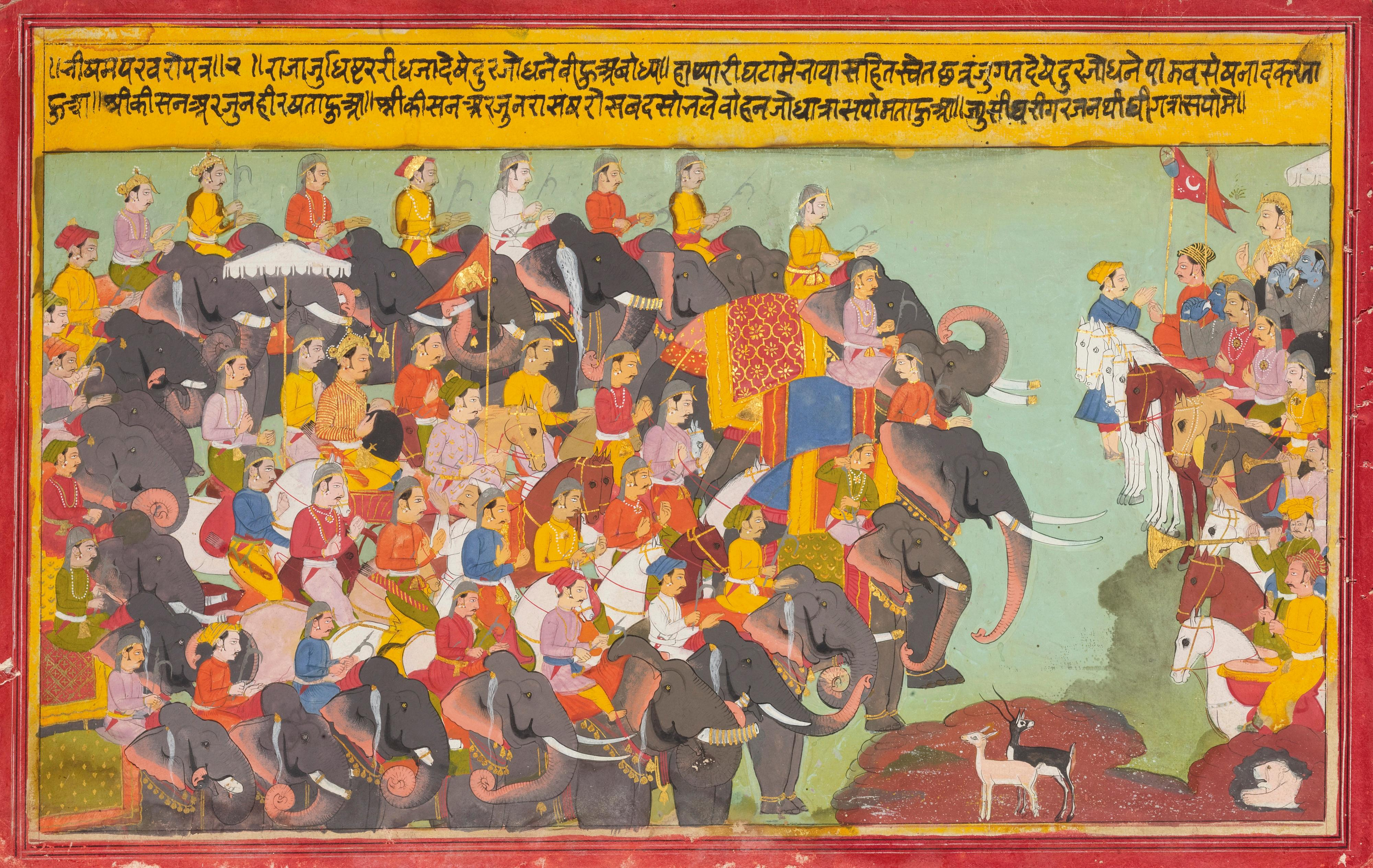
- c. 1700 watercolour from Mewar depicts the Pandava and Kaurava armies arrayed against each other.
Location	Kurukshetra
Result	Pyrrhic victory for Pandavas and allies, overthrow of the Kauravas; Fall of Hastinapura; Abdication of the throne of Hastinapura by Dhritarashtra and ascension of Yudhisthira.; Vassalage of Indraprastha to Hastinapura under Yuyutsu.; Succession crises in Anga, Chedi, Gandhara, Kalinga, Kosala, Madra, Magadha, Matsya, Panchala and Sindhu.; Regional hegemony shift from the Kurus to the Panchalas
Territorial changes	Reunification of the Kuru cities of Hastinapura and Indraprastha under the Pandavas.; Restoration of Panchala lands held by Drona to the Panchala Kingdom.; Truce and status quo ante bellum

Belligerents
Territory-less Pandavas of Kuru; Panchala under Drupada; Matsya under Virata; Vrishni under Satyaki; Chedi under Dhrishtaketu; Pandyas; Magadha under Jayatsena; Kashi; Kunti; Krishna (noncombatant); Other allies	Kauravas of Kuru kingdom; Anga; Gandhara; Sindhu; Madra; Kalinga; Kambojas; Bahlikas; Trigarta; Pragjyotisha; Yadava Army (Narayani Sena of Krishna); Pundras; Other allies

Commanders and leaders
Overlord Yudhishthira Commander-in-chief Dhrishtadyumna (day 1-18) † Other-main warriors Arjuna Bhima Drupada † Virata † Chekitana † Satyaki Shikhandi † :Abhimanyu † Ghatotkacha † 5 Kekaya princes † Uttamaujas and Yudhamanyu †	Overlords Dhritrashtra (surrendered) Duryodhana † Commanders-in-chief Bhishma (day 1-10) † Drona (day 11-15) † Karna (day 16-17) † Shalya (day 18) † Ashwatthama (night raid) (surrendered) Other commanders Dushasana † Jayadratha † Kripa (surrendered) Kritavarma (surrendered) Bhurishravas † Bahlika † Bhagadatta † Sudakshina † Shakuni †

Strength
7 Akshauhinis; 153,090-100,300,000 chariots and chariot riders; 10,000–153,090 elephants and elephant riders; 459,270–1,000,000 horses and horse riders; 765,450–1,000,000,000 infantry; (total 1,530,900 soldiers–1,003,830,900)	11 Akshauhinis; 240,570 chariots and chariot riders; 240,570 elephants and elephant riders; 721,710 horses and horse riders – 100,000,000 horses (mentioned possibly as a hyperbole); 1,202,850 infantry; 6,000,000 protecting elephants and chariots; 140,000,000 Pishachas; 280,000,000 Rakshasa; 420,000,000 Yaksha; 100,000,000 Narayani Sena; (total 8,450,700 – 1,048,405,700 soldiers)

Casualties and losses
Almost total (1,530,892 soldiers); Only 8 known survivors: the Pandavas, Krishna, Satyaki, and Yuyutsu	Almost total (2,405,697 soldiers); Only 3 known survivors - Ashwatthama, Kripa, and Kritavarma
- Yudhishthira gives a different number which is 1,660,020,000 dead and 24,165 missing.

The Kurukshetra War (Sanskrit: कुरुक्षेत्रयुद्ध), also called the Mahabharata War, is a war described in the Hindu epic poem Mahabharata, arising from a dynastic struggle between two groups of cousins, the Kauravas and the Pandavas, for the throne of Hastinapura. The war is used as the context for the dialogues of the Bhagavad Gita.

== Background ==
The Mahābhārata recounts the lives and deeds of several generations of a ruling dynasty known as the Kuru clan. Central to the epic is a dynastic conflict between two branches of this family—the five Pandava brothers and their cousins, the hundred Kauravas—over the throne of Hastinapura. The climactic battle takes place at Kurukshetra, literally the "field of the Kurus", also called Dharmakshetra ("field of dharma"). According to the text, the site was chosen because sins committed there would be absolved due to the land’s sanctity.

The war narrative occupies nearly one-fifth of the Mahābhārata, primarily in its sixth to tenth books (parvas). Krishna plays a pivotal role as mediator and as Arjuna's charioteer. On the eve of battle, when Arjuna hesitates to fight his relatives and teachers, Krishna delivers a discourse on duty and existence, later compiled as the Bhagavad Gītā.

The conflict begins after failed negotiations to divide the kingdom. Both sides gather powerful allies from across the subcontinent: the Pandavas are supported by Drupada and Shikhandi, while the Kauravas are aided by Bhīṣma, Drona, Karna, and Shalya.

== Historicity and dating ==
The historicity of the war remains the subject of scholarly discussion. The Battle of the Ten Kings, mentioned in the Rigveda, may have formed the core of the Kurukshetra war's story. The war was greatly expanded and modified in the Mahabharata's account, which makes it dubious. Attempts have been made to assign a historical date to the Kurukshetra war, with research suggesting c. 1000 BCE. However, popular tradition claims that the war marks the transition to the Kali Yuga, dating it to c. 3102 BCE.

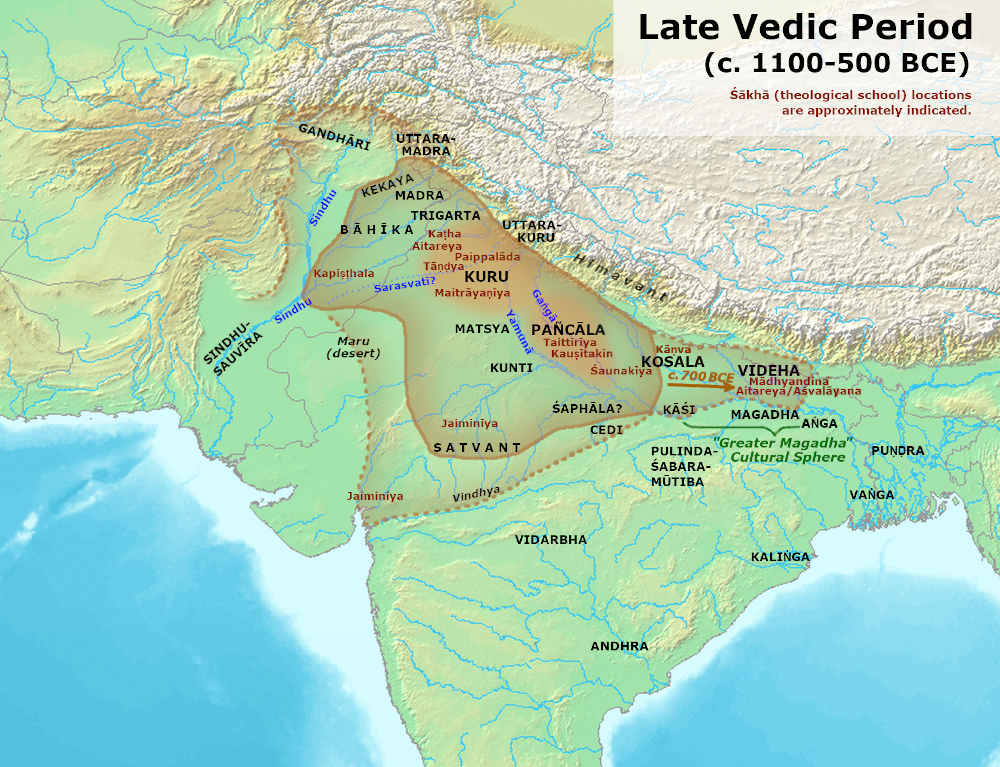
The approximate extent of Āryāvarta during the late Vedic period (c. 1100-500 BCE). Aryavarta was limited to northwest India and the western Ganges plain, while Greater Magadha in the east was habitated by non-Vedic Indo-Aryans, who gave rise to Jainism and Buddhism.

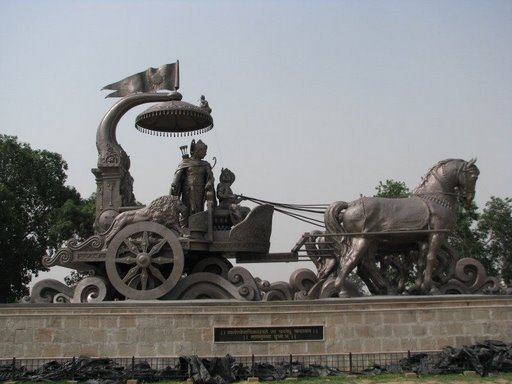
Modern bronze sculpture of Chariot with Krishna and Arjuna during the Kurukshetra War

=== Literary traces ===
Although the Kurukshetra War is not mentioned in Vedic literature, its prominence in later literature led British Indologist A. L. Basham to conclude that there was a great battle at Kurukshetra which, "magnified to titanic proportions, formed the basis of the story of the greatest of India's epics, the Mahābhārata". Acknowledging that later "generations looked upon it as marking an end of an epoch", he suggested that rather than being a civil war it might have been "a muddled recollection of the conquest of the Kurus by a tribe of Mongol type from the hills". He saw it as useless to the historian and dates the war to the ninth century BCE based on archaeological evidence and "some evidence in the Brahmana literature itself to show that it cannot have been much earlier". (Note: In discussing the dating question, historian A. L. Basham says: "According to the most popular later tradition the Mahabharata War took place in 3102 BCE, which in the light of all evidence, is quite impossible. More reasonable is another tradition, placing it in the 15th century BCE, but this is also several centuries too early in the light of our archaeological knowledge. Probably the war took place around the beginning of the 9th century BCE; such a date seems to fit well with the scanty archaeological remains of the period, and there is some evidence in the Brahmana literature itself to show that it cannot have been much earlier." Basham cites H.C. Raychaudhuri, Political History of Ancient India, pp.27ff.)

Puranic literature presents genealogical lists associated with the Mahābhārata narrative. There are two pieces of evidence of the Puranas: there is the direct statement that there were 1,015 (or 1,050) years between the birth of Parikshit (Arjun's grandson) and the accession of Mahapadma Nanda, commonly dated to 382 BCE, which would yield an estimate of about 1400 BCE for the Bharata battle, which would imply improbably long reigns on average for the kings listed in the genealogies.

There are also analyses of parallel genealogies in the Puranas between the times of Adhisimakrishna (Parikshit's great-grandson) and Mahapadma Nanda. Pargiter estimated 26 generations by averaging 10 different dynastic lists and assuming 18 years for the average duration of a reign, arrived at an estimate of 850 BCE for Adhisimakrishna and approximately 950 BCE for the Bharata battle.

=== Scholarly dating ===
Despite the inconclusiveness of the data, attempts have been made to assign a historical date to the Kurukshetra War. The existing text of the Mahābhārata went through many revisions, and mostly belongs to the period between c. 500 BCE and 400 CE. (Note: Indian archeologist Swaraj Prakash Gupta and K. S. Ramachandran: "Divergence of views regarding the Mahabharata war is due to the absence of reliable history of the ancient period. This is also true of the historical period, where also there is no unanimity of opinion on innumerable issues. Dr Mirashi accepts that there has been interpolation in the Mahabharata and observes that, 'Originally it (Mahabharata) was a small poem of 8,800 verses and was known by the name Jaya (victory), then it swelled to 24,000 verses and became known as Bharata, and, finally, it reached the present stupendous size of the one lakh verses, passing under the name Mahabharata.'") Within the frame story of the Mahābhārata, the kings Parikshit and Janamejaya are featured significantly as scions of the Kuru clan, and Michael Witzel concludes that the general setting of the epic has a historical precedent in the Vedic period, where the Kuru kingdom was the center of political power during roughly 1200 to 800 BCE. According to Professor Alf Hiltebeitel, the Mahābhārata is essentially mythological. Indian historian Upinder Singh wrote:

Whether a bitter war between the Pandavas and the Kauravas ever happened cannot be proved or disproved. It is possible that there was a small-scale conflict, transformed into a gigantic epic war by bards and poets. Some historians and archaeologists have argued that this conflict may have occurred in about 1000 BCE.

According to Finnish Sindhologist Asko Parpola, the war may have taken place during the later phase of the Painted Grey Ware, c. 750–350 BCE.

=== Popular tradition and archaeoastronomy ===
Popular tradition holds that the war marks the transition to Kali Yuga and dates it to 3102 BCE. A number of other proposals have been put forward:

- Vedveer Arya gives a date of 3162 BCE, by distinguishing between the Śaka and Śakanta eras and applying correction of 60 years to the date given in popular tradition and based on Aihole inscription.
- B. N. Achar used planetarium software to argue that the Mahabharata War took place in 3067 BCE.
- Dieter Koch dates the war to 1198 BCE using planetarium software on the basis super-conjunctions mentioned in the text.
- Kesheo Lakshman Daftari, one of the members of the Calendar Reform Committee which prepared the Indian national calendar, holds that the war took place in 1197 BCE.
- V. S. Dubey claims that the war happened near 950 BCE.

=== Associations with archaeological cultures ===
Indian archeologist B. B. Lal used the same approach with a more conservative assumption of the average reign to estimate a date of 836 BCE and correlated it with archaeological evidence from Painted Grey Ware (PGW) sites, the association being strong between PGW artifacts and places mentioned in the epic. John Keay confirmed it and also dated the battle to have taken place in 950 BCE.

According to Parpola, the war may have taken place during the later phase of the Painted Grey Ware culture, c. 750–350 BCE. He noted that the Pandava heroes are not being mentioned in the Vedic literature from before the Grhyasutras. Parpola suggests that the Pandavas were Iranic migrants, who came to South Asia around 800 BCE.

Excavations in Sinauli unearthed burials with the remains of carts (Note: These carts, often dubbed as "chariots", does not have any spokes on their wheels like the chariots (Sanskrit: Ratha) mentioned in Vedic or epic literature; the wheels are solid with no spokes.) belonging to the Ochre Coloured Pottery culture (OCP). Several authors proposed to relate the Rig Vedic culture and the war to the OCP, instead of the PGW. While the carts are dated to 1800–1500 BCE (±150), Gupta and Mani state that "in the present state of archaeological evidence OCP seems to be a stronger contender for the Mahābhārata association", dating the war to the 4th millennium BCE. Parpola sees the finds as ox-pulled carts, indicating support for his proposal for a first wave of Indo-Aryan migrations into the Indian subcontinent at the beginning of the 2nd millennium BCE, prior to the migration of the Rig Vedic people. (Note: See also Giacomo Benedetti, "Mahābhārata and archaeology: the chariot of Sanauli and the position of Painted Grey Ware" and "The Chronology of Puranic Kings and Rigvedic Rishis in Comparison with the Phases of the Sindhu–Sarasvati Civilization", dating the Mahabharata War at 1432 BCE.)

== Mahabharata account of the war ==
=== Beginning ===
In the beginning, Sanjaya gives a description of the various continents of the Earth, the other planets, and focuses on the Indian subcontinent, then gives an elaborate list of kingdoms, tribes, provinces, cities, towns, villages, rivers, mountains, and forests of the ancient Indian subcontinent (Bharata Varsha). He also explains the military formations adopted by each side on each day, the death of each hero and the details of each war-racing.

=== Krishna's peace mission ===
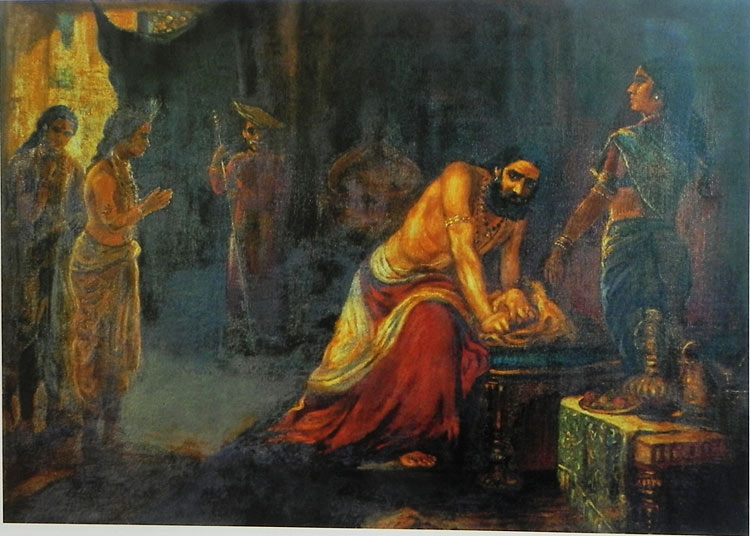
Krishna Pleads with Dhritarashtra to Avoid War

As a last attempt at peace is called for in Rajadharma, Krishna travels to the Kingdom of Hastinapura to persuade the Kauravas to see reason, avoid bloodshed of their kin, and to embark upon a peaceful path with him as the "divine" ambassador of the Pandavas. Duryodhana is insulted that Krishna turns down his invitation to accommodate himself in the royal palace. Duryodhana plots to arrest Krishna and insult, humiliate, and defame him in front of the entire royal court of Hastinapura as a challenge to the prestige of the Pandavas and declaration of an act of open war.

At the formal presentation of the peace proposal by Krishna in the Kuru Mahasabha at the court of Hastinapura, Krishna asks Duryodhana to return Indraprastha to the Pandavas and restore the status quo, or at least give five villages, one for each of the Pandavas; Duryodhana refuses. Krishna's peace proposals are ignored and dismissed, and Duryodhana publicly orders his soldiers to arrest Krishna despite warnings from the elders. Krishna laughs and displays his divine form, radiating intense light. He curses Duryodhana that his downfall was certain at the hands of the one who was sworn to tear off his thigh. His peace mission utterly insulted by Duryodhana, Krishna returns to the Pandava camp at Upaplavya to inform the Pandavas that the only course left to uphold the principles of virtue and righteousness is war. During his return, Krishna meets Karna, Kunti's firstborn (before Yudhishthira), and asks him to help his brothers and fight on the side of dharma. However, as he is being helped by Duryodhana, Karna says to Krishna that he would battle against the Pandavas as he had a debt to pay.

=== War preparations ===
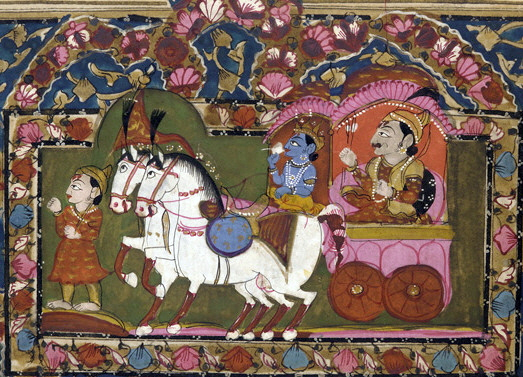
Krishna, and Arjuna on the chariot, 18th-19th century painting

Duryodhana and Arjuna go to Krishna at Dvaraka to ask for his and his army's help. Duryodhana arrives first and finds Krishna asleep. Duryodhana chooses a seat at Krishna's head and waits for him to awaken, while Arjuna sits and waits at Krishna's feet. When Krishna woke up, he saw Arjuna first and gave him the first right to make his request. Krishna tells Arjuna and Duryodhana that he would give the Narayani Sena consisting of gopas to one side and himself as a non-combatant to the other. Since Arjuna is given the first opportunity to choose, Duryodhana worries that Arjuna would choose the mighty army of Krishna. When given the choice of either Krishna's army or Krishna himself on their side, Arjuna chooses Krishna. Arjuna asks Krishna to be his charioteer, who agrees. Both Duryodhana and Arjuna returned satisfied.

The Pandavas gather their armies while camping at Upaplavya in Virata's territory. Contingents arrive from across the country.

==== Pandava Army ====
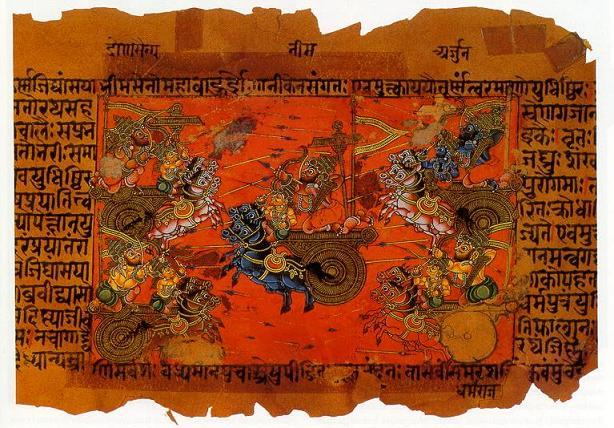
A manuscript illustration of the Battle of Kurukshetra, fought between the Kauravas and the Pandavas, recorded in the Mahābhārata

Yudhishthira asks his brothers to organize their army. The Pandavas have seven akshauhinis with the help of their allies. After consulting his commanders, the Pandavas appoint Dhrishtadyumna as the Major General of the Pandava Army.

==== Kaurava Army ====
The Kaurava Army is made up of 11 akshauhinis. This includes the Narayani Sena of Krishna, which originally included seven maharathis (Krishna, Balarama, Samba, Ahuka, Charudeshna, Chakradeva, and Satyaki) and seven athirathis (Kritavarma, Anadhrishti, Samika, Samitinjaya, Kanka, Sanku, and Kunti). Duryodhana asks Bhishma to command the Kaurava Army. Bhishma accepts on the condition that, while he would fight the battle sincerely, he would not harm the five Pandava brothers. He also says that Karna would rather not fight under him, but serve as Duryodhana's bodyguard as long as he was in the battlefield. Having little choice, Duryodhana agrees to Bhishma's conditions and makes him the Major General of the Kaurava Army, while Karna is debarred from fighting. Karna joins the war later when Bhishma is severely wounded by Arjuna and rendered immobile on the bed of arrows.

==== Neutral parties ====
The Kingdom of Vidarbha, Vidura, and Balarama are the neutral parties in this war. Rukmi, King of Vidarbha, wanted to join the war, but Arjuna refuses because he had lost to Krishna during Rukmini's svayamvara and he boasted about his war strength and army, and Duryodhana does not want Arjuna's reject. Vidura does not want to see bloodshed and is insulted by Duryodhana. The King of Udupi chooses not to fight either side , but cook for them.

=== Course of the war ===
==== Before the battle ====
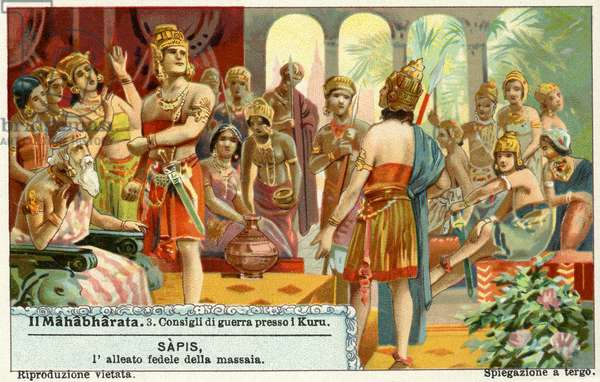
War council at Kuru

The Mahābhārata states that in the year in which the war took place, three solar eclipses took place within a thirty-day period; eclipses are considered ill omens in Hindu astrology.

On the first day of the war, as would be on all the following days, the Kaurava Army stood facing west and the Pandava Army east. The Pandava Army was organised by Yudhishthira and Arjuna in the diamond (vajra) formation.

Ten akshauhinis of the Kaurava Army were arranged in a phalanx. The eleventh was put under the immediate command of Bhishma, partly to protect him. The safety of the supreme commander Bhishma was central to Duryodhana's strategy, as he had placed all his hope on the great warrior's abilities.

==== The Bhagavad Gita ====
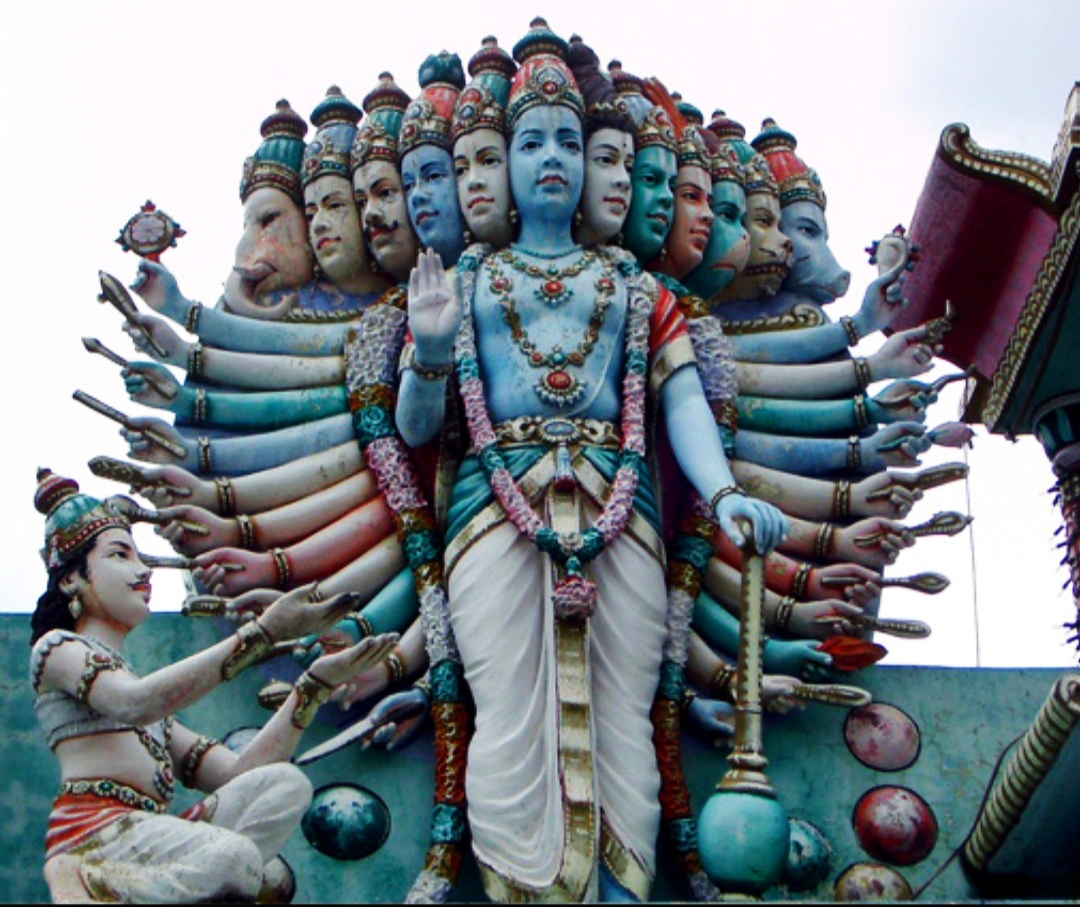
Krishna displays his Vishvarupa (universal form) to Arjuna on the battlefield of Kurukshetra.

When the war is declared and the two armies face each other, Arjuna realises that he would have to kill his dear granduncle Bhishma and his respected teacher Drona. Despondent and confused about what is right and what is wrong, Arjuna turns to Krishna for divine advice and teachings. Krishna, who Arjuna chose as his charioteer, advised him of his duty. Krishna instructs Arjuna not to yield to degrading impotence and to fight his kin. He also reminds him that it is a war between righteousness and unrighteousness (dharma and adharma), and it is Arjuna's duty to slay anyone who supported the cause of unrighteousness, or sin. Krishna reveals his divine form and explains that he is born on earth in each eon when evil raises its head.

Before the battle begins, Yudhishthira drops his weapons, takes off his armor, and walks towards the Kaurava Army with folded hands in prayer. He falls on Bhishma's feet to seek his blessing for success in battle, and he is blessed. Yudhishthira returned to his chariot and the battle was ready to commence.

==== Day 1 ====
The Pandavas suffered heavy losses and are defeated at the end of the first day. Virata's sons, Uttara and Sweta, are slain by Shalya and Bhishma. Krishna consoles Yudhishthira saying that eventually, victory would be his.

==== Day 2 ====
Arjuna, realizing that something needs to be done quickly to reverse the Pandava losses, decides to kill Bhishma. Krishna locates Bhishma's chariot and steers Arjuna toward him. Arjuna tries to engage Bhishma in a duel, but the Kaurava soldiers protect him and attack Arjuna. Arjuna and Bhishma fight a fierce battle over hours. Drona and Dhrishtadyumna similarly engage in a duel, and Drona defeats Dhrishtadyumna, who is saved by Bhima. Duryodhana sends the troops of Kalinga to attack Bhima and most of them, including the King of Kalinga, are killed. Bhishma comes to relieve the battered Kalinga forces. Satyaki, who was assisting Bhima, shoots at Bhishma's charioteer and kills him. Bhishma's horses bolt and carry Bhishma away from the battlefield.

==== Day 3 ====
The Kauravas concentrate their attack on Arjuna, whose chariot becomes covered with arrows and javelins. Arjuna builds a fortification around his chariot with an unending stream of arrows from his bow. Abhimanyu and Satyaki join forces to defeat Shakuni's Gandhara forces. Bhima and Ghatotkacha attack Duryodhana in the rear. Bhima's arrows hit Duryodhana, who collapses in his chariot. His charioteer drives him off the battlefield, and Duryodhana's forces scatter. Bhishma restores order and Duryodhana returns to lead the army. He is angry at Bhishma for what he saw as leniency towards the five Pandava brothers, and spoke harshly of him. Bhishma, stung by this unfair charge, returns to the battlefield.

Arjuna attacks Bhishma to restore order. Arjuna and Bhishma duel again.

==== Day 4 ====
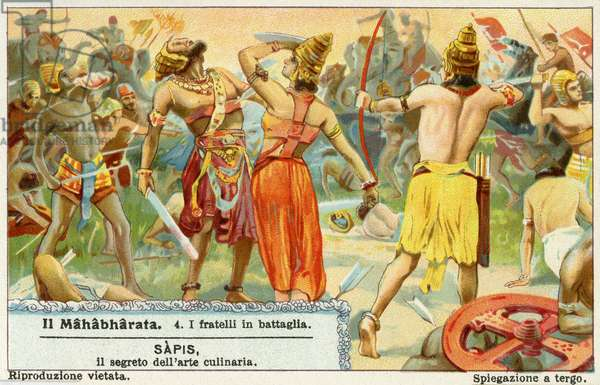
Kurukshetra War

Bhishma commands the Kaurava Army to move on the offensive. When the Kauravas form a chakravyuha, Abhimanyu enters it but is surrounded and attacked by Kaurava princes. Arjuna joins to help him. Bhima appears and attacks the Kauravas. Duryodhana sends a huge force of war elephants at Bhima, who leaves his chariot and attacks them singlehandedly with his iron mace. The elephants scatter and stampede into the Kaurava forces. Duryodhana orders an all-out attack on Bhima, who kills eight of Duryodhana's brothers before being struck by an arrow from Dushasana, the second-eldest Kaurava, in the chest and sits down in his chariot dazed.

At the end of the fourth day, Duryodhana goes to Bhisma and asks him how could the Pandavas, facing a superior force against them, have the upper hand. Bhishma says that the Pandavas have justice on their side and advises Duryodhana to seek peace.

==== Day 5 ====
The Pandava Army suffers from Bhishma's attacks. Satyaki is being beaten by Drona, but Bhima drives by and rescues him. Arjuna kills thousands of soldiers sent by Duryodhana to attack him. Bhima engages Bhishma in a duel with no clear winner. Drupada and his son Shikhandi go to help Bhima, but they are stopped by Vikarna, one of Duryodhana's brothers, who attacks and injures them badly.

==== Day 6 ====
Drona kills many Pandava soldiers and both armies' formations are broken. Bhima penetrates the Kaurava formation and attacks Duryodhana, who is defeated but rescued. The Upapandavas (sons of Draupadi) fight against Ashwatthama and destroy his chariot.

==== Day 7 ====
Drona kills Shanka, one of Virata's sons. Yuyutsu is injured by Kripa in a sword fight. Nakula and Sahadeva fight Duryodhana's brothers but are overwhelmed by the number of them.

==== Day 8 ====
Bhima kills 17 of Dhritarashtra's sons. Iravan, the son of Arjuna, kills five of Shakuni's brothers. Duryodhana deploys the Rakshasa warrior Alambusha, who kills Iravan.

==== Day 9 ====
Bhishma destroys Pandava armies. Arjuna heads to Bhishma but fights him half-heartedly. Krishna, overwhelmed by anger at the apparent inability of Arjuna to kill Bhishma, rushes towards the Kaurava commander. Ghatotkacha kills the rakshasa Alambusha.

Realising that the war could not be won as long as Bhishma was standing, Krishna suggests placing a transgender in the field to face him.

==== Day 10 ====
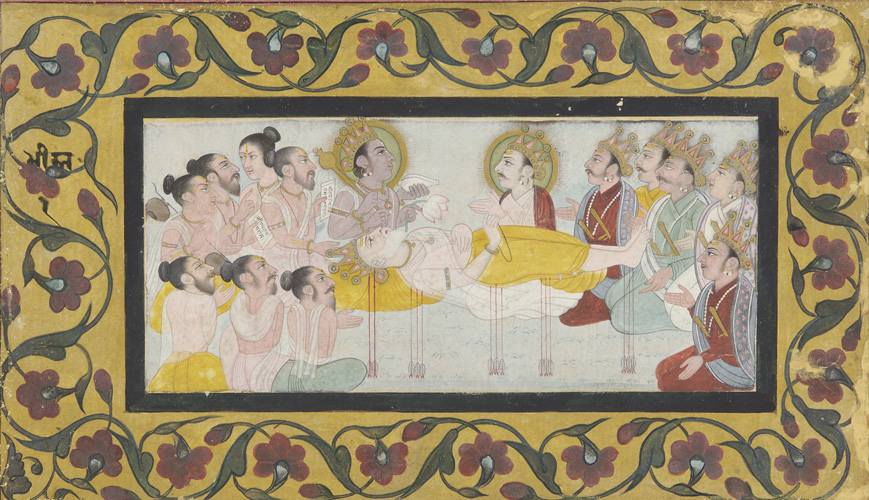
Bhishma on a deathbed of arrows, from a collection of the Smithsonian Institution

The Pandavas put Shikhandi, who had been a woman in a prior life, in front of Bhishma, as Shikhandi in her previous life as Amba had taken promise from Bhishma that he would put down all his weapons when he sees her. Shikhandi's arrows fell on Bhishma without hindrance. Arjuna positions himself behind Shikhandi, protecting himself from Bhishma's attack and aimed his arrows at the weak points in Bhishma's armor and defeats him.

The Kauravas and Pandavas gathered around Bhishma and at his request, Arjuna places three arrows under Bhishma's head to support it. Bhishma had promised his father, King Shantanu, that he would live until Hastinapura was secured from all directions. To keep this promise, Bhishma used the boon of Ichcha Mrityu (self-wished death) given to him by his father. After the war ended, when Hastinapura had become safe from all sides and after giving lessons on politics and Vishnu Sahasranama to the Pandavas, Bhishma dies on the first day of Uttarayana.

==== Day 11 ====
With Bhishma unable to continue, Karna joins the battlefield. Duryodhana makes Drona the Major General of the Kaurava forces according to Karna's advice. Duryodhana wants to capture Yudhishthira alive; killing Yudhishthira in battle would only enrage the Pandavas more, while holding him as a hostage would be strategically useful. Drona cuts down Yudhishthira's bow, and Arjuna stops Drona from capturing Yudhishthira.

==== Day 12 ====
Drona tells Duryodhana that it would be difficult to capture Yudhishthira as long as Arjuna is present. He orders the Samsaptakas (the Trigarta warriors headed by Susharma, who had vowed to either conquer or die) to keep Arjuna busy in a remote part of the battlefield, an order which they readily obey on account of their old hostilities with the Pandava scion. Arjuna defeats them before the afternoon, then faces Bhagadatta, who had been creating havoc among the Pandava troops, and defeated Bhima, Abhimanyu and Satyaki. Arjuna and Bhagadatta fight and the latter is killed. Drona continues his attempts to capture Yudhishthira, however his attacks were repelled by Prativindhya that day. The Pandavas, however, fought hard and delivered severe blows to the Kaurava Army, frustrating Drona's plans.

==== Day 13 ====
Drona's goal remains to capture Yudhishthira. Among the Pandavas, only Arjuna and Krishna knew how to penetrate and destroy the formation of chakravyuha, and to prevent them from doing so, the Samsaptakas led by Susharma challenge Arjuna and keep him busy at a remote part of the battlefield the whole day.

On the other side of the battlefield, the remaining four Pandavas and their allies find it impossible to break Drona's chakra formation. Yudhishthira instructed Abhimanyu to break the chakra/padma formation. Abhimanyu knows how to enter the chakra formation, but not know how to exit, so the Pandava follow to protect him from any potential danger. As soon as Abhimanyu enters the formation, Jayadratha stops them with help from a boon obtained from Shiva, and defeats Bhima and Satyaki.

Inside the chakra/kamala formation, Abhimanyu kills many warriors, including Vrihadvala (the king of Kosala); the king of Asmaka, Martikavata (the son of Kritavarma); Rukmaratha (the son of Shalya); and Shalya's younger brother, Lakshmana (the son of Duryodhana) and Dushasana's second son, Dushmanara.

The Kaurava commanders devise a strategy to prevent Abhimanyu from causing further damage to their force. Following Drona's instructions, six warriors attacks Abhimanyu and deprived him of his chariot, bow, sword, and shield. Abhimanyu picks up a mace; smashes Ashwatthma's chariot (upon which the latter fled); and slays one of Shakuni's brothers and numerous troops and elephants before being killed by the son of Dushasana in a mace-fight.

Upon learning of the death of his son, Arjuna vows to kill Jayadratha.

==== Day 14 ====
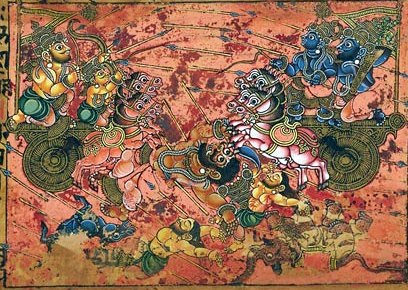
Karna kills Ghatotkacha

While searching for Jayadratha on the battlefield, Arjuna kills seven akshauhinis of Kaurava soldiers. By Shakuni's plot, Duryodhana hides Jayadratha in their camp. Arjuna uses divyastra to carry Jayadratha's head to his father leading to his own father's death. Many maharathis including Drona and Karna try to protect Jayadratha but fail to do so. Arjuna warns that everyone who supported adharma would be killed.

While Arjuna destroys the rest of the Shakatavyuha, Vikarna, the third eldest Kaurava, challenges Arjuna to an archery fight. Arjuna asks Bhima to kill Vikarna, but Bhima refuses because Vikarna had defended the Pandavas during the Draupadi Vastrapaharanam. Bhima and Vikarna shoot arrows at each other, before Bhima kills Vikarna with his mace. Drona kills Vrihatkshatra, the King of Kekeya, and Dhrishtakethu, the King of Chedi.

Dushasana's first son, Drumsena, is slain by Prativindya, the eldest son of Draupadi and Yudhishthira, in a duel. When the bright moon rose, Ghatotkacha killed warriors like Alambusha and Alayudha while flying in the air. Karna fights him and releases Vasava Shakti, a divine weapon given to him by Indra. Ghatotkacha grows in size and falls on the Kaurava Army as he dies, killing an akshauhini of them.

==== Day 15 ====
After Drupada and Virata are killed by Drona, Bhima and Dhrishtadyumna fight him. Because Drona has the Brahmanda astra, Krishna tells Yudhishthira that Drona would give up his arms if his son Ashwatthama were dead.Bhima kills an elephant named Ashwatthama and Yudhishthira delivers the news to Drona which disheartens Dronacharya, and he lays his weapons down before being killed by Dhrishtadyumna to avenge his father's death and satisfy his vow. Kunti secretly meets Karna and asks him to spare the Pandavas, as they were his younger brothers. Karna promises Kunti that he would spare them except for Arjuna, but also added that he would not fire the same weapon against Arjuna twice.

==== Day 16 ====
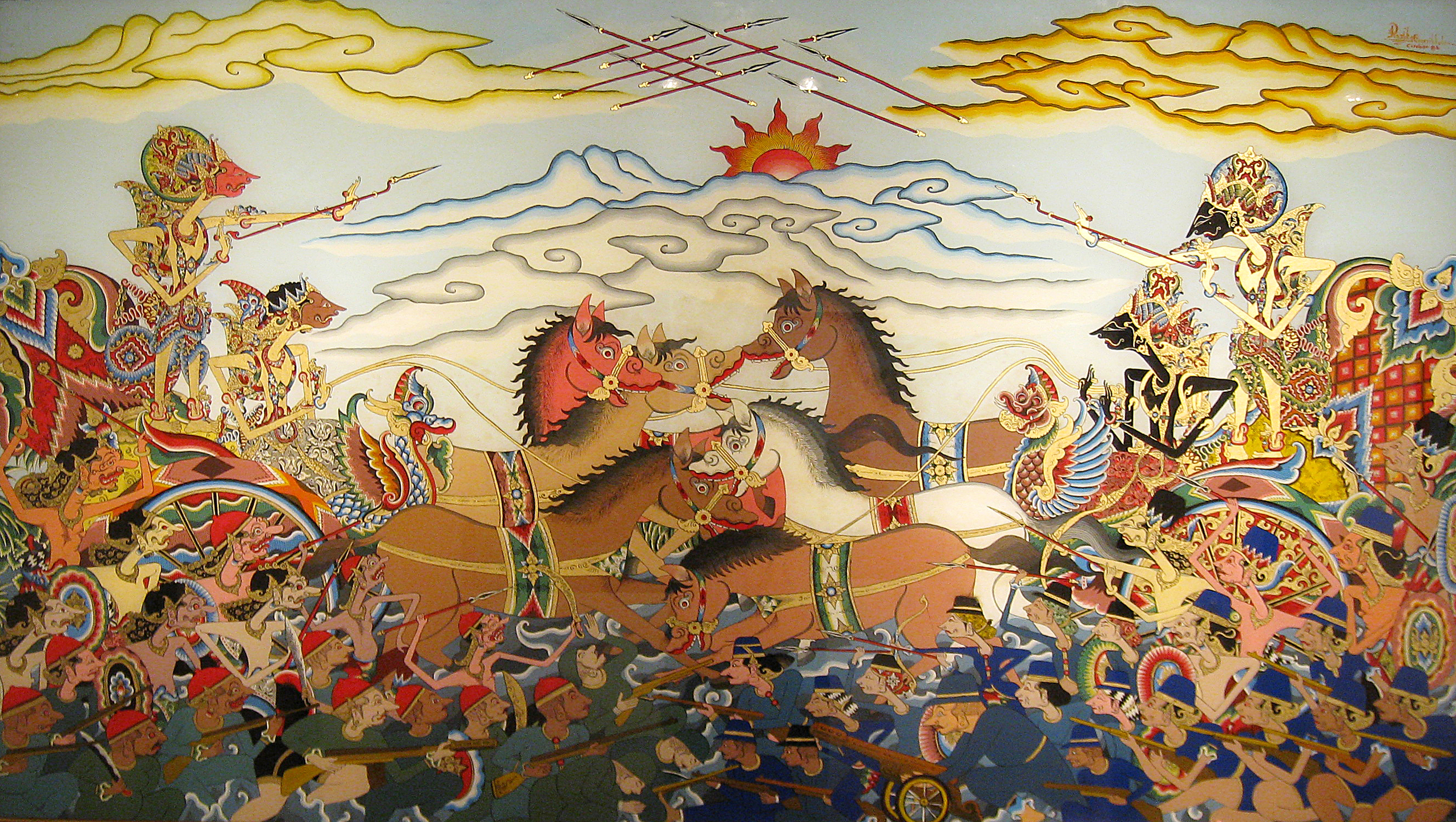
On the left Karna with Salya as chariot driver versus Arjuna with Krishna on the right, Cirebon wayang glass painting, Java, Indonesia.

Karna is made the Major General of the Kaurav Army. He is surrounded and attacked by Pandava generals, who are unable to defeat him. Karna inflicts heavy damage on the Pandava Army.

==== Day 17 ====
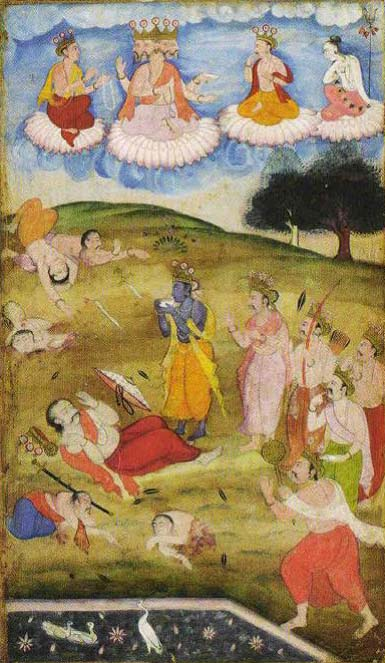
Krishna declaring the end of Mahabharata War by blowing Panchajanya, the Conch Shell.

Bhima shatters Dushasana's chariot. Bhima seizes Dushasana, rips his right arm from his shoulder, and kills him, tearing open his chest, drinking his blood, and carrying some to smear on Draupadi's untied hair, fulfilling his vow made when Draupadi was humiliated. Arjuna kills Susharma, Trigartas, and Samsaptakas. Karna later defeats Satyaki, Shikhandi, the Pandava brothers Nakula, Sahadeva, Yudhishthira and Bhima in battle but spares their lives. Karna kills multiple akshauhinis of the Pandava Army and kills the Panchalas. Karna resumes dueling with Arjuna. During their duel, Karna's chariot wheel gets stuck in the mud and Karna asks for a pause. Krishna reminds Arjuna about Karna's ruthlessness on Abhimanyu while he was similarly left without chariot and weapons. Hearing his son's fate, Arjuna shoots an arrow, but due to curse of Parushurama Karna forgets all of his knowledge of weapons, and eventually Arjuna's arrow decapitates Karna.

==== Day 18 ====
Shalya takes over as the Major General of the remaining Kaurava forces. Yudhishthira kills him in spear combat and Sahadeva kills Shakuni. Nakula kills Shakuni's son Uluka. Realizing that he had been defeated, Duryodhana flees the battlefield and takes refuge in the lake, where the Pandavas catch up with him. Under the supervision of the now-returned Balarama, a battle between Bhima and Duryodhana begins. Bhima breaks the rules under instructions from Krishna and strikes Duryodhana below the waist, leaving him mortally wounded.

Ashwatthama, Kripa, and Kritavarma gather at Duryodhana's deathbed and promise to avenge him. With Ashwatthama as general, they attack the Pandavas' camp later that night and kill all the Pandavas' remaining army including their children.

==== Aftermath ====
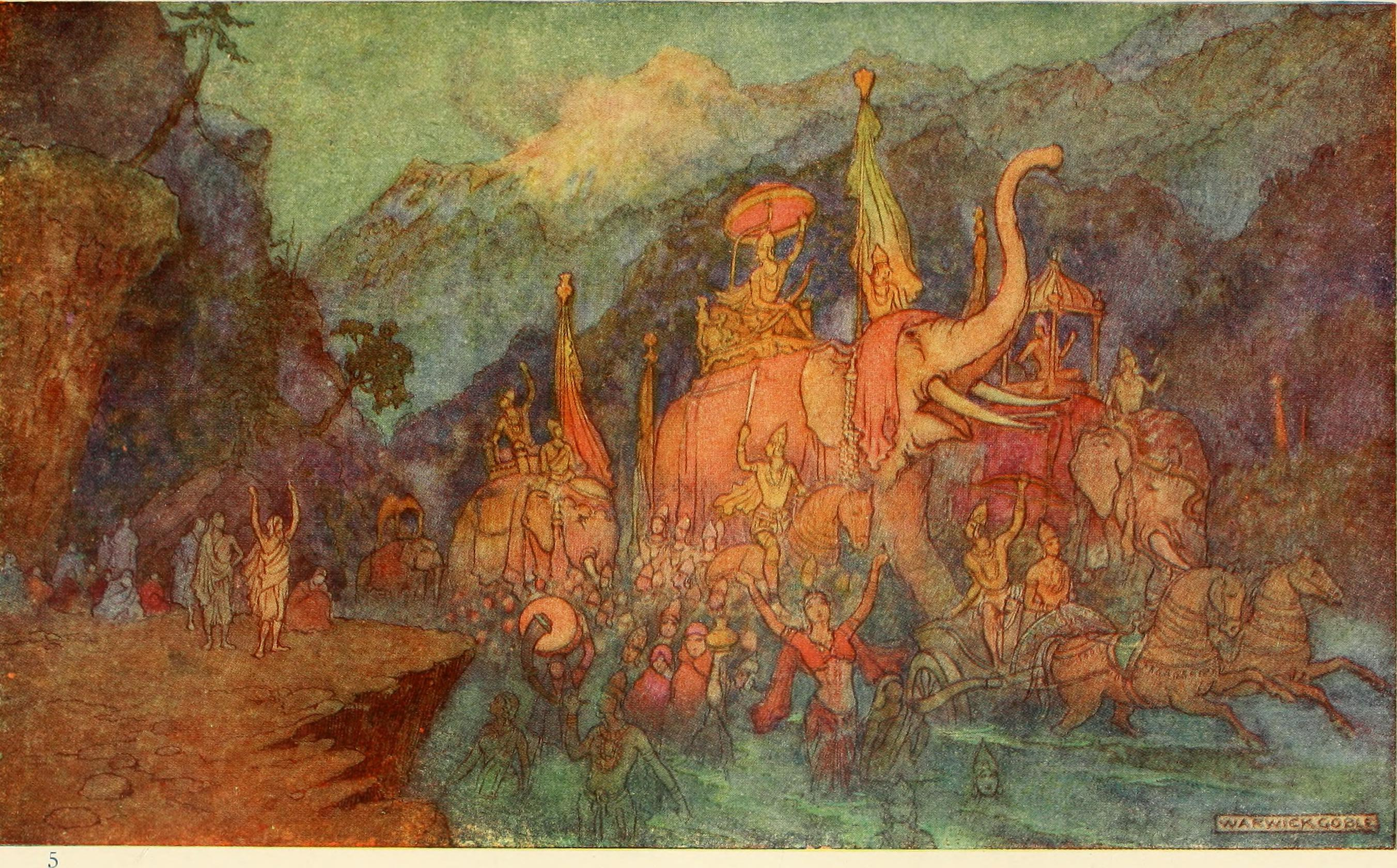
Return of heroes slain in war following chanting by Vyasa.

Only eleven major warriors survive the war: the five Pandavas, Krishna, Satyaki, Ashwatthama, Kripa, Yuyutsu and Kritavarma. Yudhishthira is crowned King of Hastinapura. After the war being a pyrrhic victory for the Pandavas, but Arjuna during the post-war period led military campaigns against Chedis, Dasharma, Nishadas, Gandharas, Manipurs and Pundras After ruling for 36 years, he renounces the throne and passes the title on to Arjuna's grandson Parikshit. Draupadi and four Pandavas—Bhima, Arjuna, Nakula and Sahadeva - die during the journey. Yudhishthira, the lone survivor and being of pious heart, is invited by Yama to enter the heavens as a mortal.

== See also ==
- Hastinapura
- Indraprastha
- Kauravas
- Historicity of the Mahabharata

== Sources ==
- Basham, A. L. (1954), The Wonder that was India: A Survey of the Culture of the Indian Sub-Continent Before the Coming of the Muslims, ACLS Humanities E-Book, ISBN 978-1597405997
- Bronkhorst, Johannes (2017), "Brahmanism: Its place in ancient Indian society", Contributions to Indian Sociology, 51 (3): 361–369, doi:10.1177/0069966717717587, S2CID 220050987
- Gupta, Vinay; Mani, B.R. (2017). "Painted Grey Ware Culture: Changing Perspectives". Journal of Multidisciplinary Studies in Archaeology: 377–378.
- Hiltebeitel, Alf (2005), "Mahabaratha", in Jones, Lindsay (ed.), MacMillan Encyclopedia of Religion, MacMillan
- Parpola, Asko (2015), The Roots of Hinduism. The Early Aryans and the Indus Civilization, Oxford University Press
- Parpola, Asko (2020). "Royal "Chariot" Burials of Sanauli near Delhi and Archaeological Correlates of Prehistoric Indo-Iranian Languages". Studia Orientalia Electronica. 8 (1): 176. doi:10.23993/store.98032. S2CID 226331373.
- Samuel, Geoffrey (2010). The Origins of Yoga and Tantra. Indic Religions to the Thirteenth Century. Cambridge University Press.
- Singh, Upinder (2009), History of Ancient and Early Medieval India: From the Stone Age to the 12th Century, Longman, ISBN 978-8131716779
- Singh, Bal Ram (2010), Origin of Indian civilization (First ed.), Dartmouth: Center for Indic Studies, University of Massachusetts and D.K. Printworld, New Delhi, ISBN 978-8124605608, archived from the original on 4 March 2016
- Witzel, Michael (1995), "Early Sanskritization: Origin and Development of the Kuru state" (PDF), Electronic Journal of Vedic Studies, 1 (4): 1–26, archived from the original (PDF) on 11 June 2007
