= Akshauhini =

Army division featured in Hinduism

An akshauhini (Sanskrit: अक्षौहिणी akṣauhiṇī) is described in the Mahabharata (Adi Parva 2.15-23) as a battle formation consisting of 21,870 chariots (Sanskrit ratha); 21,870 elephants (Sanskrit gaja); 65,610 horses (Sanskrit turaga) and 109,350 infantry (Sanskrit pada sainyam). Thus one akshauhini consisted of 218,700 warriors (not including the charioteers, who didn't fight). The ratio is 1 chariot: 1 elephant: 3 cavalry: 5 infantry soldiers. In each of these large number groups (65,610, etc.), the digits add up to 18.

It is mentioned in the Mahabharata that in the Kurukshetra War the Pandava army consisted of seven akshauhinis (1,530,900 warriors), and the Kaurava army had eleven akshauhinis (2,405,700 warriors).

== Composition ==
Patti (squad): 1 elephant (gaja) + 1 chariot (ratha) + 3 horse (ashwa) + 5 foot soldiers (padati) = 10 warriors
Senamukha = (platoon): 3 elephant + 3 chariot + 9 horse + 15 foot soldiers = 30 warriors
Gulma = (company): 9 elephant + 9 chariot + 27 horse + 45 foot soldiers = 90 warriors
Gana = (battalion): 27 elephant + 27 chariot + 81 horse + 135 foot soldiers = 270 warriors
Wahini = (regiment): 81 elephant + 81 chariot + 243 horse + 405 foot soldiers = 810 warriors
Pritana/prutana = (brigade): 243 elephant + 243 chariot + 729 horse + 1215 foot soldiers = 2,430 warriors
Chamu = (division): 729 elephant + 729 chariot + 2187 horse + 3645 foot soldiers = 7,290 warriors
Anikini = (corps): 2187 elephant + 2187 chariot + 6561 horse + 10935 foot soldiers = 21,870 warriors
Akshauhini = (army): 21870 elephant + 21870 chariot + 65610 horse + 109350 foot soldiers = 218,700 warriors

== Kaurava army and their allies ==
The Kuru army is a coalition of 11 akshauhinis formed by the kingdom of Hastinapura in alliance with races like the Samsaptakas, Trigartas, the Narayana army, the Sindhu army and Shalya of Madra.

- Bhagadatta, king of Pragjyotisha – 1 akshauhini
- Shalya, king of Madra – 1 akshauhini
- Bhurishravas, Prince of the Bahlika kingdom and the grandson of the king Bahlika – 1 akshauhini
- Kritavarma (who leads Krishna's Narayani Sena consisting of Yadava clans of Andhakas, Vrishnis, Kukuras, Bhojas and the Shainyas offered prior to the war) – 1 akshauhini
- Jayadratha (king of the Sindhu kingdom) – 1 akshauhini
- Sudakshina, king of Kambhoja – 1 akshauhini (has Yavanas & Sakas in his troops)
- Karna, king of Anga – 1 akshauhini
- Srutayudha, king of Kalinga – 1 akshauhini
- Shakuni, king of Gandhara – 1 akshauhini
- Susharma, king of Trigarta – 1 akshauhini
- Kurus and other allies – 1 akshauhini

== Pandava army and their allies ==
The Pandava army is a coalition of 7 akshauhinis, primarily the Panchala and Matsya forces, the Rakshasa forces of Bhima's son, Ghatotkacha and Vrishni–Yadava heroes.

- Kuntibhoja, king of Kunti kingdom – 1 akshauhini
- Malayadhvaja, king of Early Pandyas having a Conjugated armed force of Pandyas, Cholas and Cheras – 1 akshauhini
- Dhrishtaketu, king of Chedis – 1 akshauhini
- Sahadeva (Son of Jarasandha), king of Magadha – 1 akshauhini
- Drupada, king of Panchala, with his sons – 1 akshauhini
- Virata, king of Matsya kingdom – 1 akshauhini
- Ghatotkacha and other allies – 1 akshauhini

The 4 types of units that make up an akshauhini can also be seen in Chaturanga, the predecessor of chess.

== See also ==
- Chakravyuha
- Chaturanga
- Maharathi (warrior)
