= Dhrishtadyumna =

Character from the Indian epic Mahabharata

- Mahabharata character
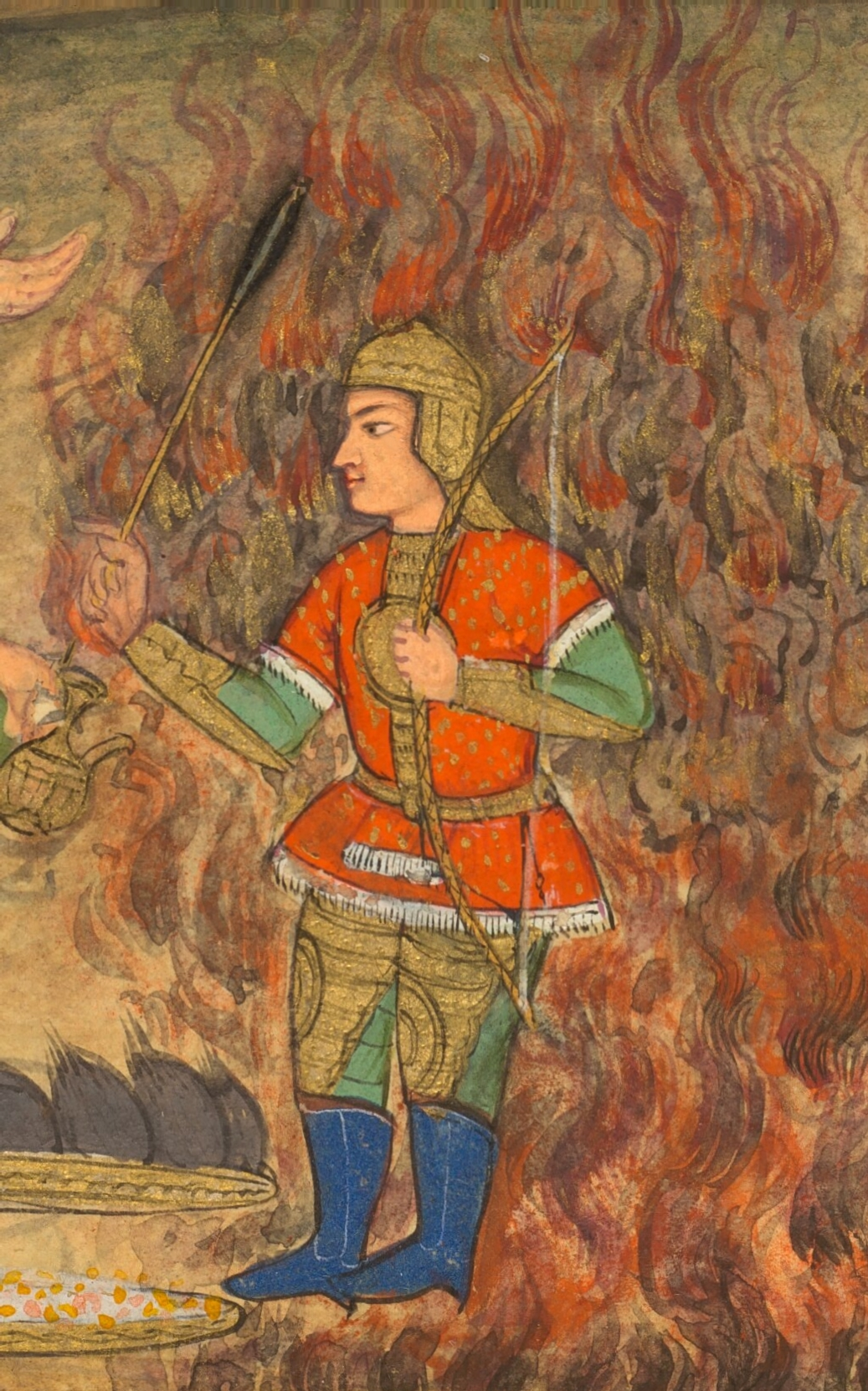
- A folio from the Razmnama (Persian translation of the Mahabharata) depicting a youthful Dhrishtadyumna emerging from fire

Information
- Titles: Prince of Panchala; Supreme Commander of the Pandavas
- Affiliation: Pandavas
- Weapon: Bow and arrows; Sword
- Family: Drupada (father); Prishati (mother); Draupadi (sister); Shikhandi and other sons of Drupada (brothers)
- Children: Kshatradharman; Kshatravarman; Kshatranjaya; Dhrishtaketu; (sons)
- Home: Panchala Kingdom

Dhrishtadyumna (Sanskrit: धृष्टद्युम्न, romanized: Dhṛṣṭadyumna, lit. 'the courageous and splendid one') is a major character in the ancient Hindu epic Mahabharata. He is described as the son of Drupada—the king of the Panchala kingdom—and the brother of Draupadi—the shared wife of the five Pandavas brothers. Dhrishtadyumna is said to have been born from a sacrificial fire ritual (yajna) performed by Drupada, accompanied by a prophecy that he would one day slay Drona, his father’s adversary. During the Kurukshetra War, Dhrishtadyumna aligns himself with the Pandavas and is appointed the supreme commander-in-chief of their forces. On the fifteenth day of the conflict, he beheads Drona, thereby fulfilling the ordained purpose of his birth.

== Birth ==
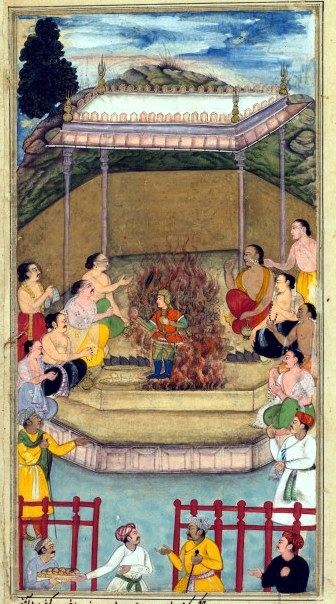
A Mughal painting by Bilal Habsi depicting the birth of Dhrishtadyumna. A folio of Razmnama, the Persian translation of the epic

Dhrishtadyumna, along with Draupadi, is described as an "ayonija", one not born from a woman's womb. His birth is narrated in the Adi Parva of the epic. According to the legend, Drupada once humiliated his childhood friend Drona because of his poor financial condition, and this led to hatred between them. Drona then became the teacher of the Pandava brothers and they defeated and captured Drupada. Though Drona spared Drupada's life because of their past friendship, he forcefully took half of Panchala. Humiliated by his defeat, Drupada wanted vengeance, but since none of his children or allies were powerful enough to defeat Drona, he decided to perform a yajna (fire-sacrifice) to obtain a powerful son.

Drupada appointed the sages Upyaja and Yaja as the head-priests and the yajna was conducted. After it was completed, the sages instructed the queen of Drupada to consume the offering to have a son. However, the queen had scented saffron in her mouth and asked them to wait till she had a bath and washed her mouth. Unable to wait, the sages poured the offering into the sacrificial altar, causing a youth to emerge. He had a fiery complexion, wore a crown on his head and armour on his body, and carried a sword, a bow, and some arrows in his hands. He then went to a chariot and the people of Panchala rejoiced after seeing him. Soon after his birth, a divine voice prophesied:

This prince hath been born for the destruction of Drona. He shall dispel all the fears of the Panchalas and spread their fame. He shall also remove the sorrow of the king.

This was followed by the emergence of a beautiful maiden from the fire. The sages named the youth Dhrishtadyumna, and the maiden was named Krishnaa, better known by her patronymic name, Draupadi.

After some time, Drona heard about Dhrishtadyumna and invited him to his kingdom. Even though Drona knew about Dhrishtadyumna's prophecy, he happily accepted him as a student and taught him advanced military arts. This made him a very powerful warrior, highly knowledgeable about celestial weapons. Dhrishtadyumna became a maharathi under the tutelage of Drona.

== Draupadi's Svayamvara ==
Dhrishtadyumna hosted his sister Draupadi's svayamvara and told its rules to the kings and princes. When a young Brahmin won Draupadi in front of all the princes and nobility, Dhrishtadyumna secretly followed the Brahmin and his sister, only to discover that the Brahmin was in fact Arjuna, one of the five Pandava brothers.

== Marriage and children ==
Dhrishtadyumna had multiple wives. He had four sons—Kshatradharman, Kshatravarman, Kshatranjaya, and Dhrishtaketu. The first three were killed in the Kurukshetra War by Drona, whereas Dhrishtaketu was killed by Karna.

== Kurukshetra War ==
Dhristadyumna was appointed as the Senapati (commander-in-chief) of the Pandava Army in the Kurukshetra War against the Kauravas. He maintained his position till the end of the war.

=== Bhishma Parva ===
Throughout the Bhishma Parva, Dhrishtadyumna is consistently portrayed as an active and formidable warrior. Early in the narrative, he is seen engaging fiercely in battle and launching direct assaults on Drona. Dhrishtadyumna also directs attacks against Bhishma, the grandsire of the Kauravas. In one encounter, he is pierced by Bhishma, nevertheless, he continues to participate in multiple assaults against Bhishma

Dhrishtadyumna is credited with organizing different military formations on different days, including the crane-shaped (krauncharuna), the half-moon (ardhachandra), the hawk-shaped (shyena) and the crocodile-shaped (makara) battle arrays. He continues to lead troops and participate in complex battlefield formations. At several points, he returns to challenge Drona, and during one intense confrontation, he must be rescued by Bhimasena. Dhrishtadyumna later repays his debt by rescuing Bhimasena in battle. He renews his attacks on Bhishma on multiple occasions and even confronts Ashvatthaman, Drona’s son

He is depicted slaying Samyamani’s son and engaging in combat with the formidable Shalya. He also faces simultaneous attacks from Kripa and Kritavarman. As the war progresses, he continues his battles with Drona, leads the Pandava warriors from the front, and is repeatedly shown at the vanguard of the action. He demonstrates his mastery of celestial weapons by deploying the Pramohana missile against Drona and others. Dhrishtadyumna persists in attacking Duryodhana and remains active through successive days of battle. He again confronts Bhishma. At one point, he leads the Panchalas at the front. In further encounters, he launches multiple attacks on Bhishma, duels with Kritavarman, and continues to strike against key Kaurava figures.

=== Drona Parva ===
In the Droṇa Parva, Dhṛṣṭadyumna once again fought Droṇa, engaged Suśarmā, and confronted Durmukha. In a later encounter, he made Droṇa swoon by firing a volley of arrows and even mounted the preceptor’s chariot. However, Droṇa recovered and defeated Dhṛṣṭadyumna in the same battle. He also fights with Drona, Jayadratha, Duryodhana, Avanti princes, Kritavarma, Aśvatthāmā and Karṇa several times. During this period, Dhrishtadyumna kills Chandravarmā and Bṛhatkṣatra, the King of Niṣadha. After Drona kills Drupada and Dhrishtadyumna's son, Dhrishtadyumna vows to kill Droṇa. He also slays Drumasena.

==== Killing of Drona ====
On the 15th day of the war, the Pandavas conceived a plot to capitalise on Drona's only weakness, his son Ashwatthama. The Pandava Bhima killed an elephant named Ashwatthama. The Pandavas spread the rumour of Ashwatthama's death. Hearing the terrible news, Drona approached the eldest Pandava Yudhishthira in disbelief, who confirmed that Ashwatthama had been killed, but murmured that it had been the elephant named Ashwatthama; the latter part of his reply was overshadowed by conches of Pandava warriors. Thinking his son had died, Drona was shocked and heartbroken. He surrendered his weapons and sat down. Drona started to meditate, and his soul left his body in quest of Ashwatthama's soul. Dhristadyumna, taking advantage of the situation, took his sword and decapitated Drona, killing him.

== Death ==
On the 18th night of the war, Ashwatthama attacked the Pandava camp during the night, and wounded Dhristadyumna. As Dhristadyumna begs for an honourable death, asking to die with a sword in his hand, Ashwatthama ignores him, proceeding to beat and smother him to death rather than beheading him, but his body disappeared.

== Analysis ==
In one of the many side-stories of the Mahabharata, there is a drama centred around the fact that Dhrishtadyumna, despite being Drupada's youngest son, is his heir. While Drupada and others give many reasons for this, it is implied that the real reason is that Dhristadyumna has a godly parent, and thus more coveted as a ruler since his rule would seem more blessed. Dhristadyumna somewhat internalizes this, looking down upon Satyajit's pacifism, and Shikhandi's single-minded hatred of Bhishma.
