= Madra kingdom =

Ancient Indian kingdom

South Asia circa 500 BCE, with location of the Madra kingdom

Madra kingdom (IAST: Mādra; [maːd̪ɽɐ]) was a kingdom grouped among the western kingdoms in the ancient Indian epic Mahabharata. Its capital was Sagala in the Madra region. The Kuru king Pandu's (Pāṇḍu) second wife was from Madra kingdom and was called Madri (Sanskrit: माद्री; IAST: Mādrī; IPA/Sanskrit: [maːd̪ɽiː]). The Pandava twins, Nakula and Sahadeva, were her sons. Madri's brother Shalya was the king of Madra. Though affectionate to the Pandavas, he was tricked by Duryodhana to side with the Kauravas during the Kurukshetra War. He was killed by Yudhishthira, the eldest Pandava. Other than the Madra kingdom (Eastern Madra or Purva Madra) with Sagala as its capital, it is believed that there was a Western Madra (Apara Madra) and a Northern Madra (Uttara Madra).

== Origin ==
According to the Vayu Purana, the Madra kingdom was founded by King Ushinara Shibi of the Anu race. Anu was the son of Yayati.

According to Bhagavata Purana, The kingdom of Madra was founded by Madra who was the son of Anu King Shibi in Treta Yuga.

== Madra Culture ==
Bahlika people were considered as "outsiders" of the Vedic culture, as being a foreign tribe of Bharatvarsha. The name Bahlika is also used to denote a kingdom different from Madra, Sindhu, Kekeya, Gandhāra & Kamboja. The Kuru king Shantanu, a forefather of Kauravas and Pandavas, had a brother who ruled the Bahlika kingdom.

== Madra as a Bahlika country ==
Bahlika or western countries were cold countries and people used blankets. They also reared sheep and drank sheep milk. They had good knowledge of camels. They had horses of excellent quality. Their horses and even horsemen were used in the wars between kings of Aryavarta (North Indian kingdoms where Vedic culture of the norm, prevailed).

Their soldiers used to aid both the parties engaged in a battle on a payment basis. Probably this was the reason why Shalya, the Madra king, has to side with Duryodhana in the Kurukshetra War, since he was tricked to accept the payment for siding with Duryodhana.

Another collective name denoting the western kingdoms is Arashtra or Aratta, meaning a kingless country. This raises the doubt, whether these countries were a republic ruled by elected chiefs, if we take the positive sense of the word. In a negative sense the word Arashtra can mean a kingdom with no control or with utter disorder.

== Origin of Madra tribe (Pandu's second wife Madri's kingdom) ==
The Yavanas, the Kiratas, the Chinas, the Savaras, the Barbaras, the Sakas, the Tusharas, the Kankas, the Pathavas, the Andhras, the Madrakas, the Paundras, the Pulindas, the Ramathas, the Kamvojas were mentioned together as tribes beyond the kingdoms of Aryavarta. The Aryavarta-kings had doubts on dealing with them. (12,64)

The Andrakas, Guhas, Pulindas, Savaras, Chuchukas, Madrakas, the Yamas, Kamvojas, Kiratas and Barbaras were mentioned as unknown tribes. In the Krita age, they were nowhere on earth (meaning Ancient India). It is from the Treta age that they have had their origin and began to multiply. When the terrible period came, joining Treta Yuga and the Dvapara Yuga, the Kshatriyas, approaching one another, engaged themselves in battle (12,206).

The Madra tribe and Salwa tribe had a common origin as hinted by a myth at (1,121). Here the origin of these two tribes were attributed to a king in the race of Puru, known by the name of Vyushitaswa. His wife was Bhadra, the daughter of Kakshivat (Kakshivat was the son of Gautama-Dirghatamas, begotten upon the servant-maid of the queen of a king named Vali who ruled in the outskirts of Magadha. (See also Anga and Magadha). Seven sons were born to Bhadra, after the death of Vyushitaswa. Later they all became kings. Three of them became the three kings of Salwa and four of them became the four kings of Madra.

The myth describes that these seven kings were born of the dead-body of her husband!

=== Alliances of Madra brides with the Kurus ===
Madra Custom of Marriage

Bhishma, the fatherlike guardian of Kuru king Pandu went to the capital of Madra, to ask for Shalya's sister as a bride to Pandu. Upon which Shalya replies:- "There is a custom in our family observed by our ancestors, which, be it good or bad, I am incapable of transgressing it. It is well-known, and therefore is known to thee as well, I doubt not." The custom was that the groom had to give dowry to the kinsmen of the bride. Bhishma gave much wealth to Shalya and took Madri as the bride for Pandu (1,113).

Pandava Sahadeva married Vijaya, the daughter of Dyutimat, the king of Madra, obtaining her in a self-choice ceremony and begat upon her a son named Suhotra. (1,95)

=== Kings of Madra ===
==== King Aswapati ====
Aswapati was the son of Madra (the founder of Madra kingdom) and grandson of King Shibi. He was the father of Savitri the famous princess of Madra, who became the lover (and later, wife) of the famous Salwa prince Satyavan. Aswapati's wife was from a minor tribe known as Malava. She was known as Malavi (3,291). The sons of Aswapati and Malavi, later became the powerful Malava kings. They spread their kingdom as far as Avanti (Ujjain, Madhya Pradesh). Thus the royal line of Malavas originated from the Madra (Punjab province of Pakistan) king Aswapati (3,297).

==== King Shalya / Mukappan ====
Shalya was the most famous king from Madra. He became the generalissimo of the Kaurava army on the last day of the Kurukshetra War. He was the oldest spear-fighter battled in Kurukshetra War.Bhima had defeated Shalya in mace-fight without knowing each other during the self-choice ceremony of Draupadi (1,192). He was slain by Pandava king Yudhishthira during the last day (18th day) of Kurukshetra War. Shalya was rated by Bhishma as an Athiratha( a great chariot-warrior) (5,166). Shalya was also skilled in knowledge of steeds and in driving the chariot on the battlefield (8,31). For this reason, Shalya was forced to be the charioteer of Karna for one day during the war. Shalya had two sons named Rukmangada and Rukmaratha (1,188). Rukmaratha was mentioned as participating in the war. Similarly, many brothers of Shalya also participated in the war. His younger brother was slain by Abhimanyu (8,5). He is also called as Mukappan.

There were other Madra kings like Dyutimat mentioned at (1,95) as the father-in-law of Pandava Sahadeva.

=== Nakula's arrival at Madra kingdom ===
Nakula, during his military campaign to the west, to collect tribute for Yudhishthira's Rajasuya sacrifice came to the Madra kingdom also

Nakula the son of Pandu, by sheer force, reduced to subjection the Ramathas, the Harahunas, and various kings of the west. And while staying there Nakula sent, messengers unto Vasudeva Krishna. And Vasudeva with all the Yadavas accepted his sway. And the mighty hero, proceeding thence to Sakala, the city of the Madras, made his uncle Shalya accept from affection the sway of the Pandavas. The illustrious prince deserving the hospitality and entertainment at his uncle's hands, was well entertained by his uncle. Nakula obtained from Shalya a large quantity of jewels and gems and left his kingdom.

=== Madra in Kurukshetra War ===
Madra king Shalya, came with an Akshouhini of troops to join the army of Pandavas, since his nephews viz the twins Nakula and Sahadeva were none other than the youngest Pandavas. His troops marched slowly on every day from Madra (Punjab province of Pakistan) to Upaplavya (somewhere on the border of Rajasthan and Haryana), the Matsya city, where the Pandavas were camped. When his army reached Kurujangala (the kingdom of the Pandavas, the modern-day Haryana), Duryodhana's men intercepted the army. They, without revealing their identity, received Shalya and his men, made tents for them and refreshed them with all comforts. The Madra soldiers also received payment from Duryodhana's officers for taking part in the Kurukshetra War. Shalya became indebted to battle for the sake of Duryodhana, by the time he learned the truth. (5,8).

The main antagonist of Shalya in bow-fight was, king Yudhishthira (5,57). Both of them engaged many times in battle. (6-45 etc.). He also made many battles with Nakula and Sahadeva. He defeated many like Virata and Drupada. Shalya became the driver of Karna's chariot on the 17th day (8,36). On the last day Yudhishthira slew his uncle Shalya, who was then the generalissimo of the Kaurava army (9,17).

Madra army battled along with other western armies like the Trigartas, the Kekeyas, the Gandharas, the Yavanas, the Sindhus, the Sauviras, the Amvasthas etc. (6-51 etc.).

On the day when Shalya was forced to become the driver of Karna's chariot, a dispute arose between them (8-40,44). The passages that describe this dispute give light to the cultural differences that existed between these warriors. (See Bahlika Culture for more details).

=== Gupta period ===
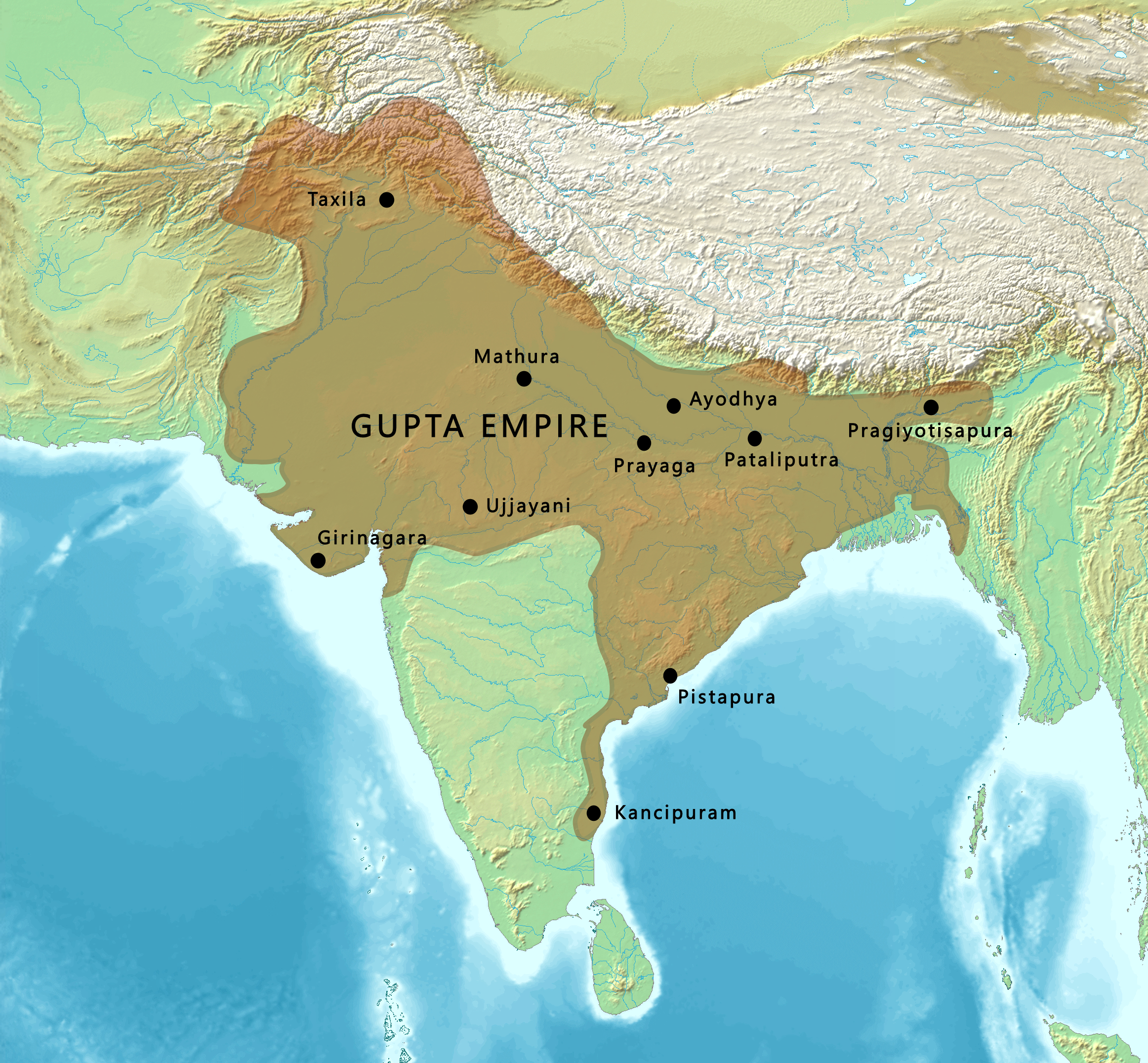
Map of the Gupta Empire c. 420 CE, according to Joseph E. Schwartzberg, with contemporary polities

During the time of the Gupta Empire, the Indian emperor Samudragupta (ruled 350-375 CE) recorded Madraka as a "frontier kingdom" which paid an annual tribute. This was recorded by Samudragupta's Allahabad Pillar inscription, which states the following in lines 22–23.

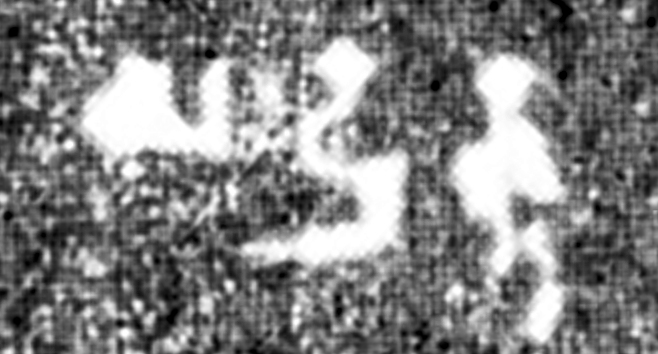
"Madraka" in the Allahabad Pillar inscription of Samudragupta (350-375 CE)

"Samudragupta, whose formidable rule was propitiated with the payment of all tributes, execution of orders and visits (to his court) for obeisance by such frontier rulers as those of Samataṭa, Ḍavāka, Kāmarūpa, Nēpāla, and Kartṛipura, and, by the Mālavas, Ārjunāyanas, Yaudhēyas, Mādrakas, Ābhīras, Prārjunas, Sanakānīkas, Kākas, Kharaparikas, Karna and other nations"

— Lines 22–23 of the Allahabad pillar inscription of Samudragupta (r.c.350-375 CE).

== Other mentions ==
- Madrabhujingas were mentioned as a kingdom of ancient India (Bharata Varsha) (6,9)
- Karna is mentioned as subjugating the Madras, along with the Gandharas, the Matsyas, the Trigartas, the Tanganas, the Khasas, the Pancalas, the Videhas, the Kulindas, the Kasi-kosalas, the Suhmas, the Angas, the Nishadhas, the Pundras, the Kichakas, the Vatsas, the Kalingas, the Taralas, the Asmakas, and the Rishikas (8,8)
- Trained elephants were mentioned as brought from the country of Madra by Vasudeva Krishna. These were given as present to the Pandavas on the occasion of their marriage with Draupadi (1,201). It is not clear how elephant could naturally exist in Madra (Punjab province of Pakistan). However, a training center to make them war-elephants could exist there.
- From the Nishadas sprang up the Madranabha caste whose members are seen to ride on cars drawn by asses. (13,48).
- Madra kings were equated to a clan of Asuras called Krodhaveshas. (1,67)
- In Vichitra Natak, a part of Dasam Granth authored by Guru Gobind Singh, there are numerous references to Madra.
- The Bhagavata Purana, gives Lord Krishna's 7th wife, Lakshmana, the titles Madri ad Madrā, and cites her as a princess of Madra. In a different text, Padma Purana, her father is named Brihatsena.
