= Karnata kingdom =

Ancient kingdoms in India

Karnata was an ancient kingdom. It is mentioned in the great epic Mahabharata, and gave its name to the South Indian state of Karnataka.

== References in Mahabharata ==
=== Sahadeva's Military Campaign to the South of India ===
- Mahabharata, Book 2, Chapter 30

Sahadeva conquered the town of Sanjayanti and the country of the Pashandas and the Karanatakas by means of his messengers alone, and made all of them pay tributes to him. The hero brought under his subjection and exacted tributes from the Paundrayas and the Dravidas, along with the Udrakeralas, the Andhras, the Talavanas, the Kalingas and the Ushtrakarnikas, and also the delightful city of Atavi and that of the Yavanas.

=== Nakula's Military Campaign to the West of India ===
- Mahabharata, Book 2, Chapter 32

Nakula subjugated the whole of the desert country and the region known as Sairishaka full of plenty, as also that other one called Mahetta. And the hero had a fierce encounter with the royal sage Akrosa. And the son of Pandu left that part of the country having subjugated the Dasarnas, the Sivis, the Trigartas, the Amvashtas, the Malavas, the five tribes of the Karnata, and those twice born classes that were called the Madhyamakeyas and Vattadhanas.

=== Karanataka, a Southern Kingdom in Bharata Varsha (Ancient India) ===
- Mahabharata, Book 6, Chapter 9

There are other kingdoms in the south. They are the Dravidas, the Keralas, the Prachyas, the Mushikas, and the Vanavashikas; the Karanataka, the Mahishakas, the Vikalpas, and also the Mushakas; the Jhillikas, the Kuntalas, the Saunridas, and the Nalakananas; the Kankutakas, the Cholas, and the Malavayakas; the Samangas, the Kanakas, the Kukkuras, and the Angara-marishas; the Samangas, the Karakas, the Kukuras, the Angaras, the Marishas: the Dhwajinis, the Utsavas, the Sanketas, the Trigartas, and the Salwasena; the Vakas, the Kokarakas, the Pashtris, and the Lamavegavasas; the Vindhyachulakas, the Pulindas, and the Valkalas; the Malavas, the Vallavas, the further-Vallavas, the Kulindas, the Kalavas, the Kuntaukas, and the Karatas; the Mrishakas, the Tanavalas, the Saniyas; the Alidas, the Pasivatas, the Tanayas, and the Sulanyas; the Rishikas, the Vidarbhas, the Kakas, the Tanganas, and the further-Tanganas.

== See also ==
- Kingdoms of Ancient India
