= Sindhu Kingdom =

Kingdom mentioned in ancient Indian epics

Sindhu Kingdom is mentioned in Indian epics like the Mahabharata and Harivamsa Purana, often alongside the Sauvira kingdom, to be located on the banks of river Sindhu (Indus). It is believed that Sindhu kingdom was founded by Vrishadarbha, one of sons of Sivi. Its inhabitants of the kingdoms were called Sindhus or Saindhavas. According to the epic Mahabharata, Jayadratha (the husband of Duryodhana's sister) was the king of Sindhus, Sauviras and Sivis. Probably Sauvira and Sivi were two kingdoms close to the Sindhu kingdom and Jayadratha conquered them, holding them for some period of time. Sindhu and Sauvira seem to have been two warring states fighting each other.

== Origin of the name ==
"Sindhu" means "river" and "sea" in classical Sanskrit. The term originated from Proto-Indo-Aryan *síndʰuṣ, from Proto-Indo-Iranian *síndʰuš (possibly derived from the BMAC substrate), or possibly from sédhati (“to go, move”), from Proto-Indo-European *ḱiesdʰ- (“to drive away; to go away”). The term Sindhu was used often to describe the Indus region as a whole, the early Vedic name for the Punjab, for example, was Sapta Sindhu.

== Mahabharata ==
Sindhu (the Bhojas, the Sindhus, the Pulindakas) is mentioned as a separate kingdom of Bharata Varsha at (6:9). The Kasmiras, the Sindhu Sauviras, the Gandharas (or Gandharvas) were mentioned as kingdoms of Bharata Varsha at (6:9). Sindhu and Sauvira are mentioned as a united country at many places, including (5:19), (6:51), (6:56), (7:107), (8:40), and (11:22).

=== Cultural affinity ===
Culturally, Sindhus were mentioned as similar to the Madras as per Karna: "The Prasthalas, the Madras, the Gandharas, the Arattas, those called Khasas, the Vasatis, the Sindhus and the Sauviras are almost as blamable in their practices." (8:44) "One should always avoid the Vahikas, those impure people that are out of the pale of virtue, and that live away from the Himavat and the Ganges and Saraswati and Yamuna and Kurukshetra and the Sindhu and its five tributary rivers." (8:44)

=== Military habits ===
"The Gandharas (or Gandharvas), the Sindhus, and the Sauviras fight best with their nails and lances. They are brave and endued with great strength. Their armies are capable of vanquishing all forces, The Usinaras are possessed of great strength and skilled in all kinds of weapons. The Easterners are skilled in fighting from the backs of war elephants and are conversant with all the ways of unfair fight. The Yavanas, the Kamvojas, and those that dwell around Mathura are well skilled in fighting with bare arms. The Southerners are skilled in fighting sword in hand." (12:100)

=== Battles between Sindhu and Sauvira ===
At (5:133) we find Kunti telling the story of Vidula who persuaded her son, who was the king of Sauvira but banished by the Sindhu king, to fight against the Sindhus and take back his kingdom from them: "The princess Vidula, one day, rebuked her own son, who, after his defeat by the king of the Sindhus, lay prostrate with heart depressed by despair." (5:133) "It is true, the king of the Sindhus hath many followers. They are, however, all discounted. Rejoice, O son, and make thyself happy in the possession of wealth in the company of the daughters of the Sauviras and do not, in weakness of heart, be ruled over by the daughters of the Saindhavas." (5:134) "Pierced by the wordy arrows of his mother, the son roused himself like a steed of proud mettle and achieved (defeating the Sindhus) all that his mother had pointed out." (5:136)

=== Jayadratha and Sindhu kingdom ===
At (3:262) Jayadratha is mentioned as the son of Vriddhakshatra. Jayadratha is mentioned as the son of Sindhu at (1:188). Jayadratha is mentioned as of Sindhu's race at (5:142). Jayadratha is mentioned as the king of Sindhu, Sauvira and other countries at (3:265). The warriors of the Sivi, Sauvira and Sindhu tribes were under the command of Jayadratha (3:269). At (11:22) Jayadradha is mentioned as the king of Sindhu and Saivira. Apart from Dussala (1:117) (the sister of Duryodhana), Jayadradha had two other wives, one from Gandhara and the other from Kamboja (11:22).

Jayadratha is mentioned as the sole ruler, governing "the rich countries of Saivya, Sivi, Sindhu and others" at (3:265). Jayadratha "had under his sway ten kingdoms," of which Sindhu was the main kingdom (8:5). Jayadratha had also played a vital role in the battle of Kurukshetra, and was killed by Arjuna. On a particular day in the battle of Kurukshetra, due to the absence of Arjuna who was fighting elsewhere, Jayadratha was able to stop the Pandavas (except Arjuna) and helped kill Abhimanyu treacherously for Kauravas.

=== Sindhu in Kurukshetra War ===
In the Kurukshetra War, Sindhu sided with the Kauravas under their ruler Jayadratha. (6:71), (7:10,136)

"Jayadratha of the country of the Sindhu, and the kings of the southern and the western countries and of the hilly regions, and Shakuni, the ruler of the Gandharas, and all the chiefs of the eastern and the northern regions, and the Sakas, the Kiratas, and Yavanas, the Sivis and the Vasatis with their Maharathas at the heads of their respective divisions joined the Kaurava army." (5:198) "A silver boar adorned the standard-top of the ruler of the Sindhus. Decked with golden chains, it was of the splendour of a white crystal." (7:102)

"In Bhishma's division were all the sons of Dhritarashtra, and also Sala who was a countryman of the Valhikas, and also all those Kshatriyas called Amvastas, and those called Sindhus, and those also that are called Sauviras, and the heroic dwellers of the country of the five rivers." (6:20)

"Those warriors that are opposed to Arjuna, viz., the Sauvirakas, the Sindhava-Pauravas, headed by Karna, are regarded as foremost of car-warriors." (7:108) "Many combatants belonging to the Nishadas, the Sauviras, the Valhikas, the Daradas, the Westerners, the Northerners, the Malavas, the Abhighatas, the Surasenas, the Sivis, the Vasatis, the Salwas, the Sakas, the Trigartas, the Amvashthas, and the Kekayas, similarly fell upon Arjuna." (6:118) "Bhishma protected by the warriors headed by Saindhava and by the combatants of the East and the Sauviras and the Kekayas, fought with great impetuosity." (6:52)

Arjuna's words, when Jayadratha and others together attacked and killed his son Abhimanyu, during the Kurukshetra War:

"Thou shalt in tomorrow's battle, O Kesava, behold the earth strewn by me with the heads of kings cut off by the force, of my shafts! (Tomorrow) I shall gratify all cannibals, rout the foe, gladden my friends, and crush the ruler of the Sindhus, viz. Jayadratha! A great offender, one who hath not acted like a relative, born in a sinful country, the ruler of the Sindhu, slain by me, will sadden his own. Thou shalt behold that ruler of the Sindhus, of sinful behavior, and brought up in every luxury, pierced by me with my shafts!" (7:73)

=== Sindhu breed of horse ===
Horses belonging to Sindhu breed were used extensively in the Kurukshetra War. (7:24) "[S]teeds consisting of the best of the Kamvoja breed as also of those born in the country of the Rivers, and of those belonging to Aratta and Mahi and Sindhu, and of those of Vanayu also that were white in hue, and lastly those of hilly countries" were the different types of horse employed in this war. (6:91)

Steeds from Sindhu "were lean-fleshed, yet strong and capable of a long journey and endued with energy and strength of high breed and docility, free from inauspicious marks, with wide nostrils and swelling cheeks, free from faults as regards the ten hairy curls, [...] and fleet as the winds." (3:71)

=== Sindhu River ===
"The river Sindhu (Indus) too is flowing with a current of fresh blood." (3:223) "The seven large rivers including the Sindhu (Indus) though flowing eastwards then flowed in opposite directions. The very directions seemed to be reversed and nothing could be distinguished. Fires blazed up everywhere and the earth trembled repeatedly." (5:84) "The spot where the Sindhu mingleth with the sea, is that tirtha of Varuna." (3:82)

- "There is a celebrated tirtha of the name of Sindhuttama" (3:82)

=== Other references ===
- Samvarana, a king in the like of Puru, "with his wife and ministers, sons and relatives, fled in fear, and took shelter in the forest on the banks of the Sindhu extending to the foot of the mountains." (1:94)
- A sage named Sindhudwipa is mentioned at (9:39–40) and (13:4) as attaining Brahminhood.

== Sindhu Kingdom in Harivamsa Purana ==
In the Harivamsa Purana, the Sindhu kingdom is mentioned at (2.56.26). The Yadavas, led by Krishna, arrived there in search for a place to build the city of Dvārakā. The place was so charming, that some of the Yadavas "started enjoying the heavenly comforts in some of the places there".
