= Nakula =

4th Pandava in the epic Mahabharata

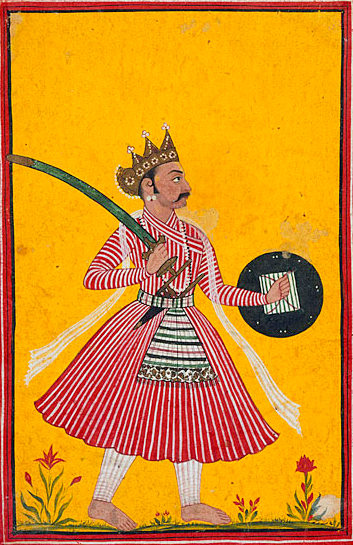
- An 18th century painting depicting Nakula

Personal Information
- Affiliation: Pandava
- Weapon: Asi (sword)
- Family: Ashvins (father); Madri (mother); Pandu (legal father); Kunti (step-mother); Sahadeva (twin-brother); Karna; Yudhishthira; Bhima; Arjuna (step-brothers)
- Spouses: Draupadi; Karenumati
- Children: Sons: Shatanika by Draupadi; Niramitra by Karenumati
- Relatives: Shalya (maternal uncle); Dhritarashtra and Vidura (paternal uncles); Kauravas (paternal cousins)

Nakula (Sanskrit: नकुल) is a major character in the ancient Indian epic, the Mahabharata. He is the elder twin brother of Sahadeva and the fourth of the five Pandava brothers. He is the son of twin physician gods, Ashvins, and Madri, the second wife of King Pandu of Kuru dynasty. In the epic, Nakula is described as the most handsome man of his lineage, and was renowned for his skill in swordsmanship and horse keeping.

He was married to Draupadi, as were his four brothers. He was also married to Karenumati of Chedi Kingdom. He had two sons Shatanika and Niramitra from his two wives respectively. During the Rajasuya of his eldest brother Yudhishthira, he conquered the kings of the Sivis, the Rohitakas and other dynasties. After Yudhishthira lost all his possessions to his cousin Duryodhana in a dice game, the Pandavas and Draupadi were exiled for thirteen years. During the Pandavas' year of incognito exile, he disguised as a horse trainer named Granthika, and worked in the kingdom of Virata. Nakula was a skilled warrior who fought in the Kurukshetra War between the Pandavas and their cousins Kauravas. At the end of the epic, during the Pandavas' journey to the Himalayas to enter heaven, Nakula was the third to fall, following Draupadi and Sahadeva, due to his excessive pride in his beauty.

== Etymology and other names ==
In Sanskrit, the word nakula means "mongoose" or "mongoose-colored."

Nakula and his brother Sahadeva are both also referred to in the epic as Āśvineya, Aśvinīsuta and Aśvisuta because they are the sons of the Ashvins and as Mādravatīputra, Mādravatīsuta, Mādreya, Mādrinandana, Mādrinandanaka, Mādrīputra, Mādrīsuta, Mādrītanūja because they are the sons of Mādrī.

== Birth and early years ==
Due to Pandu's inability to bear children (because of the curse of Rishi Kindama), Kunti had to use the boon given by Sage Durvasa to give birth to her three children. She shared the boon with Pandu's second wife, Madri, who invoked the Ashvini Kumaras to beget Nakula and Sahadeva, as twins. Madri committed self immolation, called Sati when her husband died and entrusted her children's care to Kunti. Despite different divine paternal parentage these five children, first three of Kunti – Yudhisthira, Bhima and Arjuna- and latter two of Madri – Nakula and Sahadeva, were called Pandavas, or sons of Pandu. Nakula was known to be the most handsome person in the Kuru lineage.

In his childhood, Nakula mastered his skills in fencing and knife throwing under his father Pandu and a hermit named Suka at the Satasringa ashram. Later, Pandu lost his life when he attempted to have sex with his wife, Madri. She committed suicide. Thus, Nakula along with his brothers moved to Hastinapura where he was brought up by Kunti. Kunti loved him as much as her own sons.

Nakula greatly improved his archery and swordplay skills under the tutelage of Drona. Nakula turned out to be an accomplished wielder of the sword. Along with the other Pandava brothers, Nakula was trained in religion, science, administration, and military arts by the Kuru preceptors Kripacharya and Dronacharya. He was particularly skilled at horse-riding.

== Skills ==
- Horse-keeping: Nakula's deep understanding of horse breeding and training is documented in the Mahabharata after the death of Narakasura by Krishna. In a conversation with Virata, Nakula claimed to know the art of treating all illnesses of horses. He was also a highly skilled charioteer.
- Ayurveda: Being a son of the physicians, Ashvini Kumaras, Nakula was also believed to be an expert in Ayurveda.
- Swordsman: Nakula was a brilliant swordsman and he showed his skills of a sword while killing the sons of Karna on the 12th day of Kurukshetra War.

== Marriage and Children ==
When the Pandavas and their mother, Kunti were in hiding after the event of Lakshagriha, Arjuna won Draupadi's hand in marriage. Nakula married her along with his brothers and had a son, Shatanika who was killed by Ashwatthama in the Kurukshetra War.

He also married Karenumati, the daughter of Shishupala, who bore him one son, Niramitra.

== Rajasuya conquests ==
Nakula's military expedition to the western kingdoms, as per epic Mahabharata. He seemed to have followed the Uttarapatha route.

Nakula was sent west by Yudhisthira to subjugate kingdoms for the Rajasuya sacrifice, after crowning as the Emperor of Indraprastha. Nakula set forth to the kingdom once dominated by Vasudeva with a huge army. He first attacked the prosperous mountainous country of Rohitaka. He defeated the Mattamyurakas of the land in a fierce encounter. In another battle with the sage Akrosha, Nakula subjugated the regions of Sairishaka and Mahetta. He also defeated many tribes and small dynasties, including the Dasarnas, the Sivis, the Trigartas, the Amvashtas, the Malavas, the five tribes of the Karnatas, the Madhyamakeyas, the Vattadhanas and the Utsava-sanketas.

== Exile ==
Yudhishthira's loss in the game of dice meant that all Pandavas had to live in exile for 13 years. Once in exile, Jatasura, disguised as a Brahmin, kidnapped Nakula along with Draupadi, Sahadeva and Yudhishthira. Bhima rescued them eventually and in the fight that ensued, Nakula killed Kshemankara, Mahamaha, and Suratha. In the 13th year, Nakula disguised himself as an ostler and assumed the name of Granthika (between themselves, the Pandavas called him Jayasena) at the Kingdom of Virata. He worked as a horse-trainer who looked after horses in the royal stable.

== Role in the Kurukshetra War ==
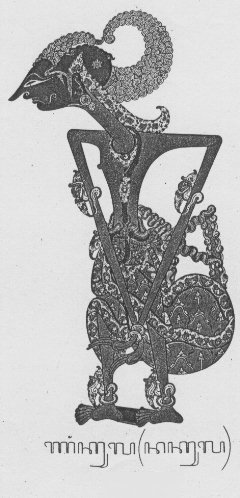
Nakula in Javanese Wayang

Nakula desired Drupada to be the general of the Pandava army, but Yudhishthira and Arjuna opted for Dhristadyumna.

As a warrior, Nakula slew prominent war-heroes on the enemy side. The flag of Nakula's chariot bore the image of a red deer with a golden back. His conch, which was blown among others at the start of the war, was named Sughosha.

On the 1st day of the war, Nakula defeated Dussasana, sparing his life so that Bhima could fulfill his oath.

On the 11th day, Nakula defeated Shalya, destroying his chariot.

On the 13th day, his advance into Dronacharya's formation was repulsed by Jayadratha.

On the night of the 14th day, he vanquished Shakuni.

On the 15th day, he defeated Duryodhana in a one-on-one duel. Duryodhana ran away in his chariot after being defeated. Nakula taunted him to stay on and fight

On the 16th day, he was defeated and spared by Karna In some devotional and folk traditions, particularly within Tamil Vaishnavite interpretations, Nakula is associated with a narrative involving Nappinnai, a consort of Krishna. According to the story, during the Pandavas’ visit to Dwaraka, Nakula received widespread admiration for his physical beauty, which gradually gave rise to a sense of pride. During a journey through a village, Nakula encountered an elderly woman who was physically frail and struggling to carry a pot of water. Rather than assisting her, he remarked dismissively on her appearance, suggesting that while some are carefully shaped by the gods, others are not. Nappinnai, who witnessed the incident, immediately intervened and instructed Nakula to seek forgiveness, stating that his words reflected arrogance rather than truth. When Nakula refused, asserting that his beauty was a divine blessing, Nappinnai warned that such pride would inevitably be corrected through experience. This warning is interpreted in later tradition as being fulfilled during the Kurukshetra War, when Nakula encountered Karna in battle and was decisively defeated and humiliated. The experience is said to have deeply affected him, leading to introspection. In the narrative, Krishna later counsels Nakula, explaining that differences in physical form, strength, or ability do not determine a person’s inner worth. He teaches that diversity is inherent in creation and that comparing individuals based on external attributes leads to ignorance. Referring indirectly to his earlier conduct, Krishna emphasizes that when one encounters weakness or disability in others, the appropriate response is not judgment but compassion expressed through action. Those who possess strength or privilege, he explains, have a responsibility to assist and uplift those facing hardship. When Nakula questions why some individuals are born with physical limitations, Krishna responds that such conditions should not be understood merely as punishment or inferiority, but as part of a larger and often incomprehensible cosmic order. Rather than dwelling on the cause of suffering, he advises focusing on one’s duty toward others. In this interpretation, helping those who are physically challenged is presented as an essential aspect of dharma and devotion. Krishna further explains that the true measure of a person lies not in the body but in character, compassion, and humility. He illustrates this idea through reference to his incarnation as Vamana, who appeared in a small and humble form yet embodied supreme divinity, demonstrating that external appearance does not reflect inner reality. He adds that visible hardship in some individuals often serves to awaken empathy in others, and that failure to respond with kindness reflects a deeper weakness of the heart. Following this teaching, Nakula is said to have returned to the village and sought out the elderly woman. This time, he perceived not her physical limitation but her endurance, resilience, and dignity. He offered a sincere apology, acknowledging that his earlier words were born of pride and ignorance. The woman forgave him, and in some devotional interpretations, she is seen as embodying a divine presence, symbolizing the idea that the sacred exists in all beings. The themes of this narrative reflect teachings found in the hymns of the Alvars, particularly in the Naalayira Divya Prabandham, where humility, compassion, and recognition of the divine in all beings are central. References to Nappinnai are especially prominent in the works of Andal, while similar philosophical ideas emphasizing the insignificance of external attributes are found in the hymns of Nammalvar. Although the narrative does not appear in the critical text of the Mahabharata, it represents a later devotional interpretation integrating epic characters into the ethical and spiritual framework of Tamil Bhakti traditions.]. On the 18th day, he defeated Karna's sons Chitrasena, Satyasena and Sushena.

== Later life and death ==
After the war, Yudhishthira appointed Nakula as the King of Northern Madra and Sahadeva as King of southern Madra.

Upon the onset of Kali Yuga and the departure of Krishna, the Pandavas retired. Giving up all their belongings and ties, the Pandavas and Draupadi, along with a dog, made their final journey of pilgrimage to the Himalayas.

Except Yudhishthira, all of the Pandavas grew weak and died before reaching heaven. Nakula was the third one to fall after Draupadi and Sahadeva. When Bhima asked Yudhishthira why Nakula fell, Yudhishthira replied that Nakula took pride in his beauty and believed that there was nobody equal to him in looks. Nakula is seen among the Ashvins, alongside Sahadeva, when Yudhisthira ascended to Svarga.

== Sources ==
- Vyāsa (November 2006). Mahabharata: The great hall. Book two. NYU Press. ISBN 978-0-8147-9406-7.
- Chakravarti, Bishnupada (13 November 2007). Penguin Companion to the Mahabharata. Penguin UK. ISBN 978-93-5214-170-8.
- Mani, Vettam (1975). Puranic encyclopaedia : a comprehensive dictionary with special reference to the epic and Puranic literature. Robarts – University of Toronto. Delhi : Motilal Banarsidass. ISBN 9780842608220.
