= Sauvira kingdom =

Legendary kingdom mentioned in ancient Indian literature

South Asia circa 500 BCE, with location of the Sauvira kingdom in the Indus Valley.

Sauvīra is an ancient kingdom mentioned in the Late Vedic and early Buddhist literature and the Hindu epic Mahabharata. It is often mentioned alongside the Sindhu kingdom in the lower Indus Valley. Its capital city Roruka is identified with present-day Aror/Rohri in Sindh and is mentioned in the Buddhist literature as a major trading center. According to the Mahabharata, Jayadratha was the king of the Sindhus, Sauviras and Sivis, having conquered Sauvira and Sivi, two kingdoms close to the Sindhu kingdom. Jayadratha was an ally of Duryodhana and the husband of Duryodhana's sister Dussala. The kingdom of Sauvira is also stated to be close to the Dwaraka and Anarta kingdoms. According to Bhagwat Puran Sauviras were once connected with Abhira.

== Mahabharata ==
=== Cultural affinity ===
Culturally, the Sauviras were mentioned by the character Karna as being similar to the Madras: "The Prasthalas, the Madras, the Gandharas, the Arattas, those called Khasas, the Vasatis, the Sindhus and the Sauviras are almost as blamable in their practices." (8:44)

=== Military habits ===
The Gandharvas [or Gandharas], the Sindhus, and the Sauviras fight best with their nails and lances. They are brave and endowed with great strength. Their armies are capable of vanquishing all forces. The Usinaras possess great strength and are skilled in all kinds of weapons. The Easterners are skilled in fighting from the backs of war elephants and are proficient with alternate fighting methods. The Yavanas, the Kamvojas, and those that dwell around Mathura are well skilled in fighting with bare arms. The Southerners are skilled in fighting sword in hand. (12:100)

=== Battles between Sindhu and Sauvira ===
In book 5, section 133 of the Mahabharata, the character Kunti tells the story of Vidula. Vidula persuaded her son, who was the king of Sauvira but banished by the Sindhu king, to fight against the Sindhus and take back his kingdom from them: "And the princess Vidula, one day, rebuked her own son, who, after his defeat by the king of the Sindhus, lay prostrate with heart depressed by despair." (5:133) "Rejoice, O son, and make thyself happy in the possession of wealth in the company of the daughters of the Sauviras and do not, in weakness of heart, be ruled over by the daughters of the Saindhavas." (5:134) "Pierced by the wordy arrows of his mother, the son roused himself like a steed of proud mettle and achieved [defeating the Sindhus] all that his mother had pointed out." (5:136)

=== Kings of Sauvira ===
==== Rahugan ====
There is a mention of King Rahugan meeting with Bharat followed by an extensive dialogue between them about life and its meaning.

==== Suvira ====
The kingdom of Sauvira was founded by Prince Suvira, one of the sons of Sivi. The neighboring kingdoms of Madra, Kekaya, and Sindhu belonged to Madraka, Kekaya, and Vrsadarbh, the other three sons of Sivi.

==== Jayadratha ====
Jayadratha was the king not only of Sauvira but of Sindhu and other countries as well. (3:265) The warriors of the Sivi, Sauvira and Sindhu tribes were under the command of Jayadratha. (3:269)

In section 22 of book 11, Jayadradtha is again mentioned as the king of Sindhu and Saivira, and being married to — besides Dussala (the sister of Duryodhana) — two other wives, one from Gandhara and the other from Kamboja.

Jayadratha is mentioned as the king of Sauvira at many places in the Mahabharata, such as in this conversation between Jayadratha's ally Kotika and Draupadi, the wife of the Pandavas:

I am king Suratha's son whom people know by the name of Kotika, and that man with eyes large as the petals of the lotus, sitting on a chariot of gold, is the warrior known by the name of Kshemankara, king of Trigarta. And behind him is the famous son of the king of Pulinda, who is even now gazing on thee. Armed with a mighty bow and endued with large eyes, and decorated with floral wreaths, he always liveth on the breasts of mountains. The dark and handsome young man, the scourge of his enemies, standing at the edge of that tank, is the son of Suvala of the race of Ikshwaku. And if, O excellent lady, thou hast ever heard the name of Jayadratha, the king of Sauviras, even he is there at the head of six thousand chariots, with horses and elephants and infantry, and followed by twelve Sauvira princes as his standard-bearers, named Angaraka, Kunjara, Guptaka, Satrunjaya, Srinjaya, Suprabiddha, Prabhankara, Bhramara, Ravi, Sura, Pratapa and Kuhana, all mounted on chariots drawn by chestnut horses. The brothers also of the king, viz., the powerful Valahaka, Anika, Vidarana and others, are among his followers. These strong-limbed and noble youths are the flowers of the Sauvira chivalry. The king is journeying in the company of these his friends. (3:263)

==== Other Sauvira kings ====
A king named Satrunjaya among the Sauviras is mentioned at (12:139). The whole chapter consists of a conversation between this king and a sage in the Bharadwaja clan.

Arjuna and the other Pandava princes became so powerful that they slew in battle the great Sauvira who had performed a sacrifice extending over three years, undaunted by the raids of the Gandharvas [alternatively Gandharas]. And the king of the Yavanas himself, whom the powerful Pandu even had failed to bring under subjection, was brought by Arjuna under control. Then again Vipula, the king of the Sauviras, endued with great prowess, who had always shown a disregard for the Kurus, was made by the intelligent Arjuna to feel the edge of his power. And Arjuna also repressed by means of his arrows (the pride of) king Sumitra of Sauvira, also known by the name of Dattamitra[,] who had resolutely sought an encounter with him. (1:141)

A prajapati (patriarch) named Manu, and his descendants who ruled Sauvira, are described by Bhishma:

Manu had a son [...] of the name of the Ikshwaku. [...] His tenth son [...] was named Dasaswa, and this virtuous prince of infallible prowess became the king of Mahismati. Dasaswa's son [...] was known by the name of Madiraswa and ruled over the Earth as her lord. He was constantly devoted to the study of the Vedas as also of the science of arms. Madiraswa's son was the king named Dyutimat who possessed great good fortune and power and strength and energy. Dyutimat's son was the highly devout and pious king who was famous in all the worlds under the name of Suvira. [...] Suvira too had a son who was invincible in battle, and who was the best of all warriors and known by the name of Sudurjaya.(13:2)

King Suvira is also mentioned in Book 1, Section 67 as one of "many heroic kings on earth."

King "Ajavindu among the Suviras" is mentioned as an annihilator of his own race. (5:74)

=== Sauvira in the Kurukshetra War ===
In the Kurukshetra War, Sauvira sided with the Kauravas under their ruler Jayadratha. (6:71), (7:10,136)

"In Bhishma's division were all the sons of Dhritarashtra, and also Sala, who was a countryman of the Valhikas, and also all those Kshatriyas called Amvastas, and those called Sindhus, and those also that are called Sauviras, and the heroic dwellers of the country of the five rivers." (6:20)

"The Abhishahas, the Surasenas, the Sivis, and the Vasatis, the Swalyas, the Matsyas, the Amvashtas, the Trigartas, and the Kekayas, the Sauviras, the Kitavas, and the dwellers of the eastern, western, and northern countries were all resolved to fight reckless of the lives." (6:18)

Those warriors that are opposed to Arjuna, viz., the Sauvirakas, the Sindhava-Pauravas, headed by Karna, are regarded as the foremost of car-warriors (7:108). "[M]any combatants also, belonging to the Nishadas, the Sauviras, the Valhikas, the Daradas, the Westerners, the Northerners, the Malavas, the Abhighatas, the Surasenas, the Sivis, the Vasatis, the Salwas, the Sakas, the Trigartas, the Amvashthas, and the Kekayas, similarly fell upon him" (Arjuna). (6:118) Bhishma the son of Santanu, protected by the warriors headed by Saindhava and by the combatants of the East and the Sauviras and the Kekayas, [fought] with great impetuosity. (6:52)

"[T]he diverse tribes of the Sauviras, the Vasatis, and the Kshudrakas, and the Malavas, all these, at the command of the royal son of Santanu [Bhishma], quickly approached Kiritin [Arjuna] for battle." (6:59)

=== Other references in the Mahabharata ===
- "Prompted by sinful motives, this one [meaning Shishupala of Chedi] ravished the reluctant wife of the innocent Vabhru (Akrura) on her way from Dwaraka to the country of the Sauviras."(2:44) This is an indication of the ancient route that existed connecting Dwaraka and Sauvira.
- "Manasyu [a king in the line of Puru] had for his wife Sauviri. And he begat upon her three sons called Sakta, Sahana, and Vagmi." (1:94) (This may be coincidental.)
- Shalya is mentioned as belonging to the Sauvira clan at (8:9). (This could be a translation error.)

== Classical texts ==
According to the Bhagavata Purana, another Hindu text, the Sauviras were once connected with the Abhira tribe.

The Compendium of Charaka (Sanskrit चरकसंहिता Charaka saṃhitā) is an early text on Ayurveda (Indian traditional medicine) probably completed in its present form in the first few centuries AD. In chapter 1 of the Vimānasthāna section of the Compendium, at verse 18, the author notes that the people of Sauvīra are over-fond of salt in their diet, and even consume salt in milk. As a consequence they [are said to] suffer from ailments such as lethargy, slackness and weakness of body.

== See also ==
- Kingdoms of Ancient India
