= Shalya =

Madra King in the Indian epic Mahabharata

- Mahabharata character
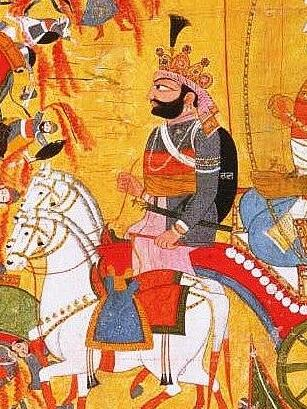
- Shalya driving the chariot of Karna (cropped), Pahari painting, c. 1820

Information
- Position: King of Madra
- Affiliation: Kauravas
- Weapon: Spear; Gada
- Family: Madraraja (father); Madri (sister)
- Children: Rukmangada and Rukmaratha
- Relatives: Nakula and Sahadeva (nephews); Pandu (brother-in-law)
- Home: Madra Kingdom

Shalya (Sanskrit: शल्य, lit. Pike) is a major character in the Mahabharata, one of two Sanskrit epics of Ancient India. He was a powerful king from the Bahlika clan, ruling over the Madra kingdom in the Northwest region of the Indian subcontinent. Although he was the brother of Madri, the wife of Pandu, Shalya sided with the Kauravas in the Kurukshetra War. Despite his allegiance, he supported the Pandavas and wished for their victory. While he initially fought as a key warrior for the Kauravas, he was made Karna’s charioteer and, following Karna’s death, was appointed as the commander-in-chief of the Kaurava forces. Shalya was killed by the eldest Pandava, Yudhishthira.

== Epithets ==
Shalya is referred to by various epithets, including:

- Artayani
- Balhika Pungava
- Madradhipa
- Madraja
- Madrajanadhipa
- Madraka
- Madraraj
- Sauvira

== Early life and relations ==
Shalya was the ruler of the Madra kingdom and was renowned for his formidable skills as a warrior and his wisdom. His sister, Madri, was married to Pandu, King of Kuru kingdom at the request of Bhishma, in exchange of heavy bride price consisting of gold and jewels from Hastinapura. (Adi Parva, Chapter 112).

Shalya was present at the svayamvara of Draupadi alongside his sons, Rukmangada and Rukmaratha (Adi Parva, Chapter 185, Verse 18). However, he withdrew from the contest after failing to string the bow (Adi Parva, Chapter 186, Verse 28). Bhima later defeated him at the wedding (Adi Parva, Chapter 189, Verse 23).

During Nakula's western conquests, Shalya befriended his nephew and was entertained by him (Sabha Parva, Chapter 32, Verse 14). He also attended Yudhishthira's Rajasuya yajna (Sabha Parva, Chapter 34, Verse 7) and presented Yudhishthira with a sword and a golden jar at his coronation (Sabha Parva, Chapter 53, Verse 9).

== Allegiance to Duryodhana ==
The Udyoga Parva describes about the preparation of the Kurukshetra War and the formation of alliances. Though Shalya was related to the Pandavas and initially intended to fight for them, he was deceived by Duryodhana’s cunning. As he traveled to join the Pandavas, Duryodhana arranged an extravagant reception for him, ensuring that Shalya and his army received unparalleled hospitality. Assuming that the Pandavas were behind these arrangements, Shalya praised his hosts. However, when he discovered that it was actually Duryodhana who had extended this courtesy, he felt obligated by royal etiquette to grant him a boon. Seizing the opportunity, Duryodhana requested Shalya to fight for the Kauravas, and bound by his word, Shalya reluctantly agreed.

Despite aligning with the Kauravas, Shalya secretly wished for the Pandavas' victory (Bhishma Parva). Prior to the start of the war, Yudhishthira met with his elders on the Kaurava side, seeking their blessings. Shalya readily offered his blessings to Yudhishthira, wishing him victory. Shalya was requested by Yudhishthira to heap praises of his brothers in order to infuriate Karna. He subtly worked against Karna during his battle with Arjuna, using his position as Karna’s charioteer to demoralize him (Karna Parva).

== Role in the Kurukshetra War ==
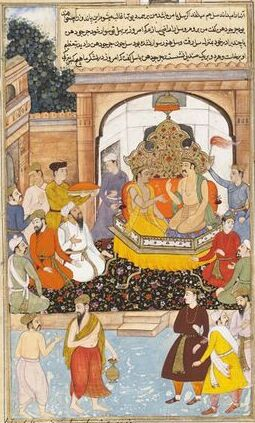
Duryodhana requests Shalya to become Karna's charioteer, an illustration from Razmnama, the Persian translation of the Mahabharata

=== Participation in the battle ===
Shalya engaged in multiple battles, displaying both valor and strategic acumen:

- On the first day of the war, he dueled with Yudhishthira (Bhishma Parva, Chapter 45, Verse 28).
- He killed Uttara, the prince of Virata (Bhishma Parva, Chapter 47, Verse 35).
- He defeated another prince of Virata, Shankha (Bhishma Parva, Chapter 49, Verse 35).
- He fought against Dhrishtadyumna (Bhishma Parva, Chapter 62) and was later defeated by Bhima (Bhishma Parva, Chapter 64, Verse 27).
- Clashed with multiple warriors including Yudhishthira, Nakula, Sahadeva, Shikhandi, and Arjuna throughout the war.
- Protected Jayadratha from Arjuna’s assault (Drona Parva, Chapter 145, Verse 9).

=== Charioteer of Karna ===
Shalya was reluctantly made Karna’s charioteer at Duryodhana’s insistence (Karna Parva, Chapter 32). Despite this, he constantly undermined Karna’s confidence by praising Arjuna (Karna Parva, Chapter 37, Verse 33). Their tense relationship escalated when Karna threatened to kill him (Karna Parva, Chapter 40), but Shalya countered by narrating the tale of the swan and the crow, mocking Karna’s arrogance (Karna Parva, Chapter 41).

Shalya prevented Karna from killing Nakula, Sahadeva, and Yudhishthira (Karna Parva, Chapter 63, Verse 21) and later consoled him when he was intimidated by Bhima (Karna Parva, Chapter 84, Verse 8).

=== Commander-in-chief and death ===
After Karna’s death, Shalya was appointed as the commander-in-chief of the Kaurava army on the eighteenth and final day of the war (Shalya Parva, Chapter 6, Verse 28). He led the army with great might but was ultimately defeated and killed by Yudhishthira in battle (Shalya Parva, Chapter 17, Verse 52). When Gandhari surveys the corpses on the Kurukshetra battlefield after the end of the war, she finds Shalya's tongue being eaten by birds.

His soul was among those summoned during the Shraddha rites at the Ganga (Ashramavasika Parva, Chapter 32, Verse 10).

== Previous birth ==
According to the Mahabharata, Shalya was a reincarnation of Samhlada, the son of Hiranyakashipu and brother of Prahlada (Adi Parva, Chapter 67, Verse 6).
