= Sahadeva =

Character from Indian epic Mahabharata; 5th Pandava

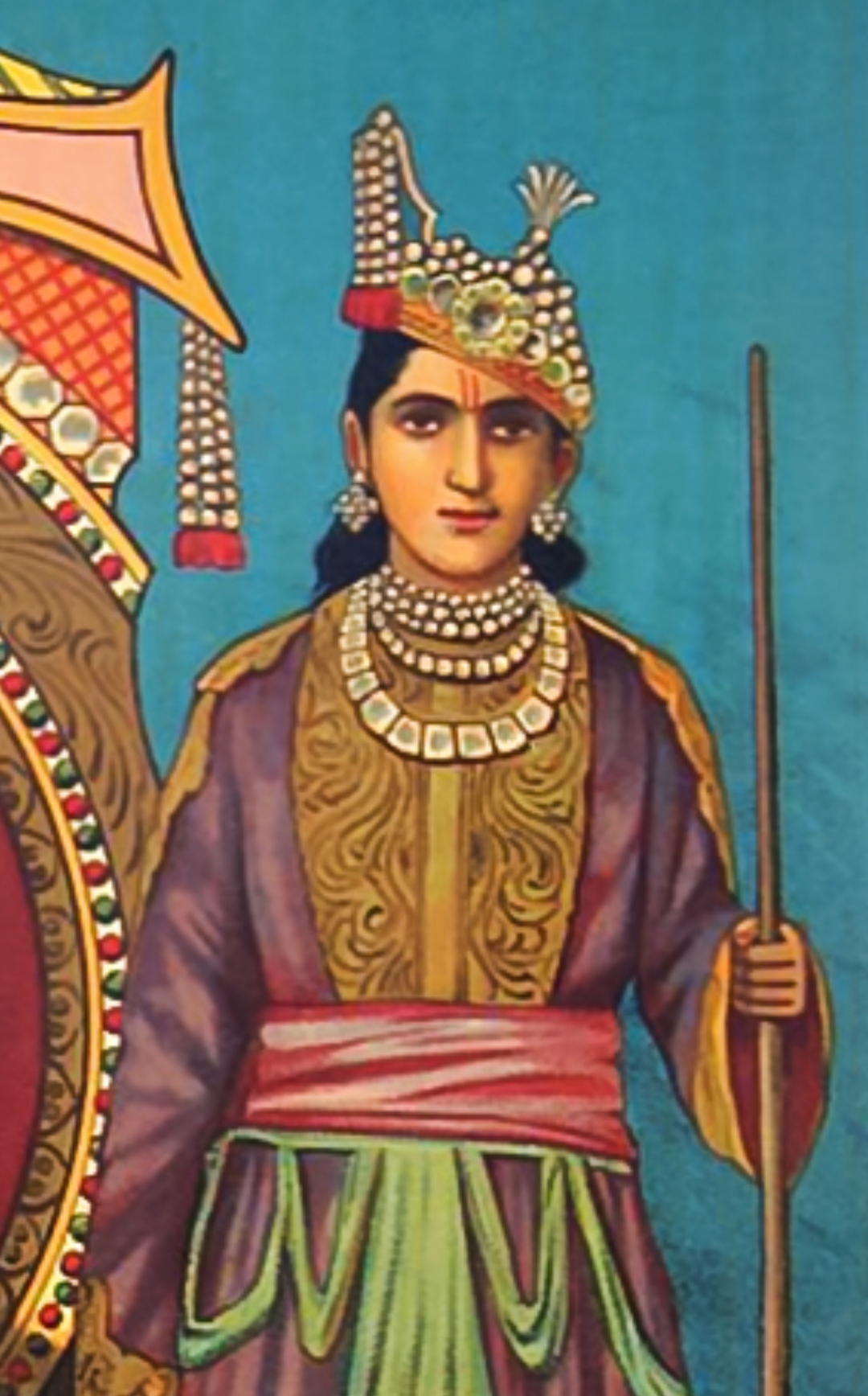
- A print on Sahadeva by Raja Ravi Varma Press

Personal Information
- Affiliation: Pandavas
- Weapon: Sword
- Family: Ashvins (father); Madri (mother); Kunti (mother); Pandu (legal father); Nakula (twin brother); Karna; Yudhishthira; Bhima; Arjuna (half brothers)
- Spouses: Draupadi; Vijaya; Unnamed daughter of Jarasandha (Note: Though not attested in the Mahabharata, the text Harivamsa adds Bhanumati—a princess from the Yadava clan—as one of the wives of Sahadeva)
- Children: Shrutasena by Draupadi; Suhotra by Vijaya
- Relatives: Dhritarashtra and Vidura (paternal uncles); Kauravas (paternal cousins); Shalya (maternal uncle)

Sahadeva (Sanskrit: सहदेव, romanized: Sahadeva, lit. 'one with the gods') was the youngest of the five Pandava brothers in the ancient Indian epic, the Mahabharata. He and his twin brother Nakula were the sons of Madri, one of the wives of the Pandava patriarch Pandu, and Ashvins, the divine twin physicians of the gods, whom she invoked to beget her sons due to Pandu's inability to progenate. Sahadeva is renowned for his wisdom and skill in swordsmanship.

Sahadeva was married to Draupadi, as were his four brothers. He was also married to Vijaya of Madra kingdom. He had two sons, Shrutasena and Suhotra, from his two wives respectively. Sahadeva played a crucial role during the Rajasuya of Yudhishthira, where he conquered the kings of the South. After Yudhishthira lost all of his possessions to Duryodhana in the game of dice, Sahadeva vowed to slay Shakuni, Duryodhana's maternal uncle, who had used loaded dice to unfairly win the game. Afterwards, the Pandavas and Draupadi were exiled for thirteen years, with the last year being a period of hiding called as Agyaata Vaasa. During the hiding, Sahadeva disguised himself as a Vaishya named Tantripala and worked as a cowherd in the kingdom of Virata. Sahadeva was a skilled warrior who fought in the Kurukshetra War between the Pandavas and their cousins, the Kauravas. On the 18th day of the war, he slew Shakuni. At the end of the epic, during the Pandavas' journey in the Himalayas to enter Svarga, Sahadeva was the second to fall, following Draupadi, due to his excessive pride in his wisdom.

== Etymology ==
The word sahadeva is derived from two Sanskrit words saha (सह) and deva (देव). Saha means ‘with’ and deva is a Hindu term used for ‘deity’. So literally, Sahadeva means ‘with the gods’ or ‘protected by the gods’. In southern India, he is regarded as a very accomplished astrologer, a face reader, and a master of all other forms of intuitive perception. He was known for his secretive nature; although he accurately understood a situation, he never revealed anything about it. Hence, presently, people who have a similar nature are called a Sahadeva.

In the epic, various epithets for Sahadeva has been used. Prominent ones are the patronymics—Āśvineya, Aśvinīsuta—and matronymics—Mādrīputra, Mādreya. Other important other names are Bharataśārdūla, Bharatasattama, Kauravya, Kurunandana, Nakulānuja, Pāṇḍava and Pāṇḍunandana.

== Literary background ==
The story of Sahadeva is told in the Mahabharata, one of the Sanskrit epics from the Indian subcontinent. Sahadeva also appears in later Hindu scriptures like the Harivamsa—which is regarded as khila (supplement or appendix) of the Mahabharata—and Puranas like the Bhagavata Purana.

== Biography ==
=== Birth and early years ===
Sahadeva was one of the five brothers born to Pandu, a member of the illustrious Lunar dynasty lineage and the heir of the throne of Kuru. The collective name “Pandavas” originates from their father. However, Pandu was afflicted by a curse that would lead to his demise if he engaged in sexual relations with a woman. Consequently, Sahadeva and his brothers were born through a sacred mantra bestowed upon Pandu's first wife Kunti by the revered sage Durvasa during her maidenhood. Both of Pandu's wives—Madri and Kunti—invoked different deities and were blessed with children.

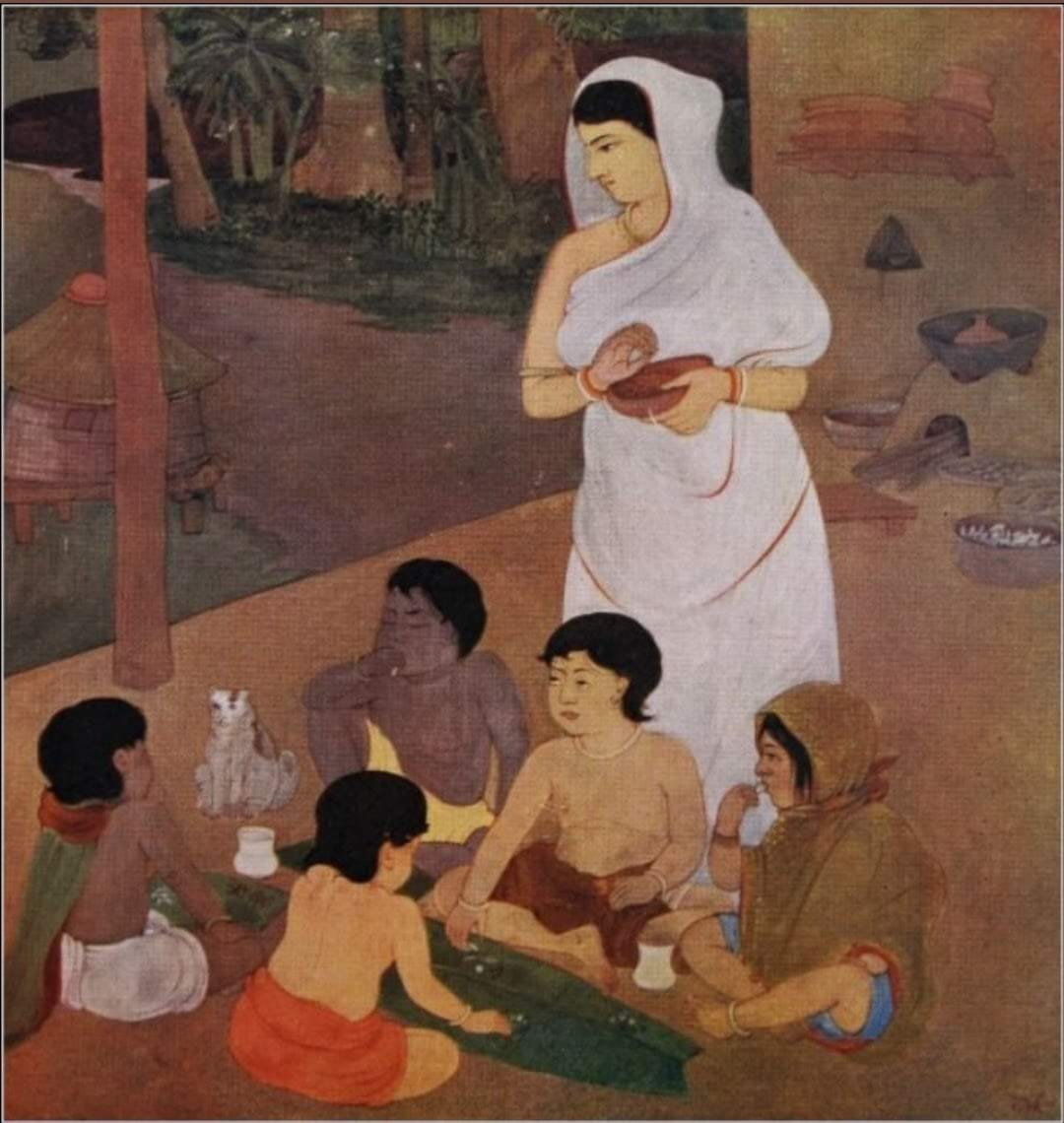
'The Festival of Cakes' by Nandalal Bose, possibly depicting the widowed Kunti feeding her five children—the Pandavas

According to the Adi Parva ('First Book') of the Mahabharata, upon Pandu's behest, Kunti had used her boon three times to invoke celestial gods and gave birth to her three children—Yudhishthira, Bhima and Arjuna. Upon hearing about Madri's desire to give birth to a son, Pandu requested Kunti to share her boon with her. Madri, upon seeking divine assistance, invoked the twin celestial deities of health, the Ashvini Kumaras, and bore two sons—Nakula and Sahadeva—who were extolled to be unparalleled in earthly beauty. An ethereal voice proclaimed that these twins would surpass even the Ashvins themselves in energy and allure. Despite invoking the gods only once, Madri obtained two remarkable sons. However, her co-wife, Kunti, fearing that Madri might surpass her in offspring, beseeched the king not to command her further, accepting this as her granted boon. Sahadeva, along with his brothers, spent his childhood in the company of sages at Shatashriga mountain. However he was orphaned after Pandu, who had a curse inflicted upon him by Kindama, attempted to engage in love making with Madri, resulting in his demise. Following this, Madri entrusted her children to Kunti, and followed him to his death by performing the ancient practice of sati, immolating herself on her husband's funeral pyre. Kunti raised the twins alongside her own sons in Hastinapura, the capital of Kuru which was being ruled under Pandu's elder brother Dhritarashtra. (Note: Despite being the younger brother of Dhritarashtra, it was Pandu who succeeded their father as king of Bharata. This was because Dhritarashtra was blind, a disability that caused him to forfeit his right to the royal succession. Dhritarashtra fathered 100 sons, known as the Kaurava brothers, and ascended the throne on the death of Pandu.) Despite Sahadeva not being her biological offspring, Kunti held a special affection for him, making him her favorite among the Pandavas. The Pandava brothers were brought up with their paternal cousins, the Kauravas, and the education of all these boys was supervised by Bhishma.

Sahadeva and Nakula, along with the other princes, were instructed in the gurukula by Kripa and Drona in warfare and use of weapons such as bow and arrows and martial art. He also mastered his skills in fencing and axe fighting. After completing their training, the Pandavas defeated Drupada, King of Panchala, as a gurudakshina for Drona. Notably, Sahadeva along with Nakula protected the wheels of Arjuna's chariot during this endeavor. Later, Duryodhana—the eldest son of Dhritarashtra and leader of hundred Kaurava brothers—plotted to burn the Pandavas alive by constructing Lakshagriha, a lac palace, in Varanavata. Fortunately, with the aid of their wise uncle Vidura, the Pandavas escaped through a secret tunnel.

=== Marriages and children ===
In the Adi Parva, two wives of Sahadeva are mentioned—Draupadi, the princess of Panchala who was also married to his four brothers as well, and Vijaya, the princess of Madra. It also narrates how he married them:

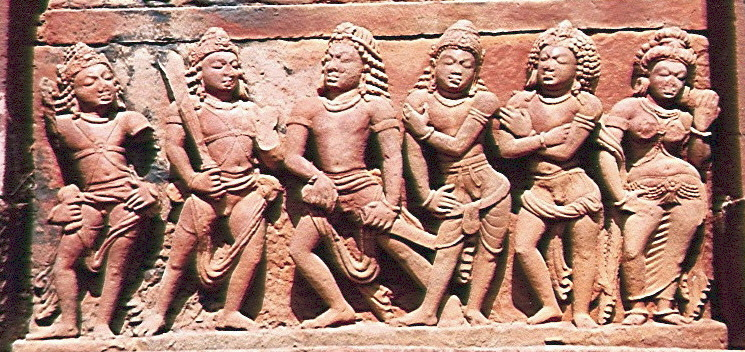
Stone relief from Deogarh depicting the Pandavas with Draupadi

Following the events at Lakshagriha, Sahadeva, accompanied by his mother and brothers, made the decision to conceal themselves from Hastinapura. During this period, Arjuna received information that Drupada, the ruler of Panchala, was organizing an archery tournament to determine the suitor for his daughter's hand in marriage and disguised as a Brahmin, emerged victorious in the tournament. Returning home, Arjuna jokingly referred to Draupadi as their "alms," prompting Kunti to inadvertently instruct her sons to share her. Yudhishthira, recalling sage Vyasa's prophecy that Draupadi was destined to marry five men, observed his brothers' mutual affection for her and agreed. Drupada, though initially hesitant, accepted the marriage as dharmic, and Draupadi wed all five Pandavas. To prevent discord, the brothers agreed that anyone intruding upon Draupadi in private would face a year of exile. Sahadeva was the fourth in line as Arjuna had broken the treaty, resulting in latter's exile. Shrutasena was born to Sahadeva and Draupadi. Sahadeva later also married Vijaya, the daughter of his maternal uncle Dyutimata of Madra, in a self-choice ceremony organised in Madra. She who bore him one son, Suhotra.

Later in the Ashramvasika Parva, the character Sanjaya mentions another wife of Sahadeva, described as the daughter of king Jarasandha of Magadha. Simon Brodbeck theorizes that this marriage might have taken place after the Kurukshetra War, as this unnamed wife is not mentioned elsewhere.

The Harivamsa, the appendix of the Mahabharata, adds Bhanumati as another wife of Sahadeva. According to the story narrated in the Vishnu Parva of the text, she was the daughter of the Yadava leader Bhanu. The Yadavas held a festival when Krishna travelled to the sacred palace known as Pindaraka with his entourage of Yadavas. Bhanumati was taken away by a demon known as Nikumbha at the event. This resulted from a curse placed on Bhanumati by Durvasa, whom Bhanumati had formerly disregarded during their meeting in Raivata's garden. After the curse, Durvasa had comforted her by telling her that she will be rescued. It is true that Bhanumati was rescued by the combined effort of Krishna, Arjuna and Pradyumna and wed Sahadeva on the suggestion of the divine-sage Narada.

=== Conquest and Rajasuya Yajna ===
Sahadeva's military expedition to the southern kingdoms, as per epic Mahabharata

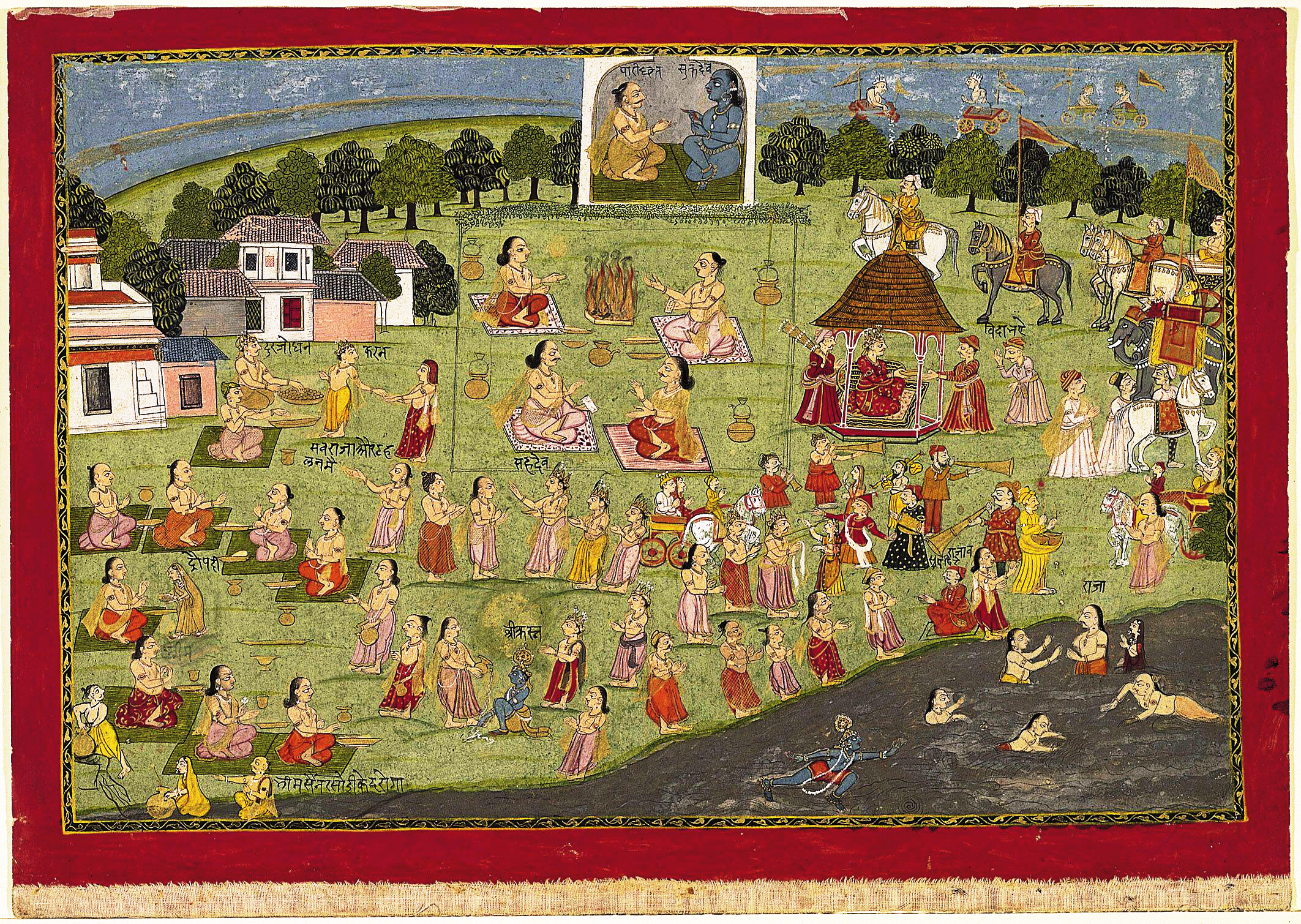
King Yudhishthira performs the rajasuya sacrifice in which Sahadeva performs unique services before and during the yajna.

Sahadeva played an active role in the establishment of his eldest brother—Yudhishthira—as a sovereign emperor. The Adi Parva narrates that after the Svayamvara ceremony of Draupadi, news of the Pandavas' survival and alliance with Drupada of Panchala reached Hastinapura. It led to mixed reactions among the Kuru elders and princes. King Dhritarashtra, influenced by the wise counsel of Vidura, Bhishma, and Drona, acknowledged the Pandavas’ right to the throne and decided to share the kingdom to avoid conflict. The Pandavas, Kunti and Draupadi were invited back to Hastinapura and were warmly received by the citizens. However, to prevent further discord, Dhritarashtra suggested that the Pandavas establish their domain in Khandavaprastha, a barren land. The Pandavas accepted the proposal and transformed Khandavaprastha into the magnificent city of Indraprastha, which became a thriving center of culture and commerce.

Sabha Parva ('Book of the Assembly Hall), the second book of the Mahabharata, describes the Pandavas' life at the Indraprastha court and Yudhishthira's Rajasuya Yajna, which leads to the expansion of the Pandava brothers’ empire. Rajasuya was a grand Vedic ritual performed by ancient Indian kings to assert their sovereignty and demonstrate their supremacy. The epic states that Yudhishthira desired to perform the Rajasuya sacrifice not for personal power but to establish dharma (morals, virtues and righteousness) and defend it across the world. The brothers including Sahadeva went for out in four directions for subjugating other kingdoms and rulers and collected huge bounties which enriched the treasury of Indraprastha kingdom immensely. Sahadeva was sent to south direction, specifically chosen for the southern campaign because of his expertise with the sword, and because Bhishma opined that Southerners are skilled with sword-fighting in general.

The Mahabharata mentions several kingdoms to the south of Indraprastha which were conquered by Sahadeva. Some of them are as under:

- Surasenas
- Pandyan dynasty
- Matsya, the king Dantavakra, kings Sukumara, Sumitra, other Matsyas and Patacharas.
- Kings of Lanka who claimed to be descendants of Vibhishana, the king of Lanka and brother of Ravana. He offered him diverse kinds of jewels and gems, sandalwood, celestial ornaments, costly apparel and valuable pearls. Sahadeva deputed his nephew, Ghatotkacha (son of Bhima) to collect these taxes considering the latter's Rakshasa lineage.
- At Kishkindha, the monkey-kings Mainda and Dvivida were defeated in a 7-day war.
- City of Mahishmati, which was ruled by King Nila. Since the kingdom had the blessings of Agni, a huge fire obstructed the army when Sahadeva tried to invade; later prayer to Agni enabled Sahadeva to complete the conquest.
- King Rukmi of Vidarbha and territories of Bhojakata
- Nishadas, the hill of Gosringa and King Sreenimath.
- Navarashtra, under King Kunti-Bhoja
- King Jamvaka, on the banks of the river Charmanvati.
- Territories lying on the banks of the Venwa.
- Kingdoms that lay on the banks of the Narmada.
- Avanti, kings called Vinda and Anuvinda, a town of Bhojakata
- King of Kosala
- King of Tripura
- King of Saurashtra
- Surparaka kingdom, Talakatas and Dandakas
- Mlechchha tribe living on the sea coast, Nishadas, the cannibals, Karnapravarnas, and the Kalamukhas (a cross between human beings and Rakshasas) and the whole area of the Cole mountains.
- Surabhipatna and the island called the Copper island, and a mountain called Ramaka.
- The town of Timingila and a wild tribe is known by the name of the Kerakas who were men with one leg.
- The town of Sanjayanti, countries of the Pashandas, Karahatakas, Paundrayas, Dravidas, Udrakeralas, Andhras, Talavanas, Kalingas and Ushtrakarnikas, Sekas and Yavanas
- Paurava kingdom
- A verse in the scriptures also mention that Sahadeva before his invasion south of Indraprastha, had forced tribute from Antioch, Rome and the City of the Greeks. His twin brother Nakula is said to have conquered the Huns along with Chinese to give tribute at the Rajasuya Yajna.

The Sabha Parva further narrates that after the brothers successfully returned from their campaign, the venue and other aspects related to the conduct of the Rajasuya was elaborately done under the stewardship of Bhishma. Sahadeva served as Yudhishthira's minister in the ceremony, and helped in conducting various rituals. When Bhishma ordained that Krishna deserved the honour of the first sacred arghya of the Yajna due to his divine attributes and contributions in establishing dharma, King Shishupala of Chedi opposed this. Sahadeva boldly declared his support for Krishna's worship and challenged anyone who disagrees to respond. His action was met with silence from the other kings, signifying their acceptance or reluctance to oppose him. Later, after the completion of the Yajna, Sahadeva escorted Drona and his son Ashwatthama back to their palaces.

=== Exile ===
Following Yudhishthira's loss in the game of dice meant that all Pandavas including Draupadi had to live in exile for 13 years with last year in Agnatavas (incognito).

As the Pandavas departed Hastinapura, the entire populace of the city had lined along the streets in grief. Sahadeva had then smeared his face with mud thinking "none should recognise me in this hour of calamity". Nakula covered himself with ashes. Arjuna scattered sands to symbolize the countless arrows he would let loose in battle, Bhima walked with his hands outstretched to indicate to people that no one could equal him, and Yudhishthira had covered his face. Kunti had appealed to Draupadi to take care of her son Sahadeva as he holds a special place in her heart; Draupadi had left Hastinapura along with the Pandavas wearing a single safron cloth with her hair disheveled.

During their exile, travelling on pilgrimage from place to place, Sahadeva and his brothers were living at Badrinath. A rakshasa named Jatasura was also living amidst them in disguise of a learned Brahmin, and enjoying their hospitality. Suddenly, when Bhima was away from the camp on a hunting trip, Jatasura assumed the form of a demonic rakshasa and forcibly abducted Yudhishthira, Nakula, Sahadeva, and Draupadi, with the objective of seizing their weapons. Sahadeva somehow extricated himself from the clutches of Jatasura and attacked him with his sword, and at the same time calling out to Bhima for help. Jatasura also counterattacked Sahadeva. A long fight ensued between them, and Sahadeva initially felled Jatasura to the ground. Sahadeva had then thrown his axe at him but Jatasura rose up and struck Sahadeva and threw him to the ground; Yudhisthira, Nakula and Draupadi were distressed and told Jatasura that his death was near. Sahadeva and Jatasura continued the fight by uprooting trees and throwing them at each other, and at one stage, Sahadeva by throwing his axe had cut off the Jata or hair tuft by which the rakshasa was known as Jatasura, which infuriated him further. The rakshasa then, with magical powers, as a mayavi, had assumed immense proportions and relentlessley attacked and injured Sahadeva. But then Bhima appeared on the scene eventually, and challenged Jatasura, asking his brothers to keep away. In a very fierce fight, Bhima hit Jatasura's head with his mace and slew him. Sahadeva and his brother Nakula with their brothers Bhima and Yudhishthira then trekked to a nearby lake, which was surrounded by a herbal forest, where they nursed their wounds.

In the 13th year, Pandavas collectively decided that the Virata kingdom of king Virata would be an ideal place for them to hide in disguise. The day after Draupadi's entrance into Virata's palace as Sairandhri, 'an expert maid', in the name of Malini, employed by Queen Sudeshna, Sahadeva made his way into the city dressed as a cowherd. He arrived at one cow posture in the region of Virata's palace. The king happened to be visiting his herd and was present when he saw a handsome well built man clad in a cowherd's dress, and speaking the dialects of the cowherds. Beholding him the king was struck with amazement. He asked Sahadeva, "To whom dost though belong" and whence though come; What work dost though seek: I have never seen thee before." Sahadeva replied saying that he was a Vaisya, Arishtinemi by name, and was earlier in the employment of Kuru King Yudhishthira, the eldest of the five sons of Pandu and had tended to eight hundred thousand cattle and that people used to call him 'Tatripala' (Pandavas however called him Jayadbala), and that he knew the present, the past and the future of all kine (cows) living within ten yojanas (12–15 kilometres (7.5–9.3 mi)). He also told the king the means by which kine population could be multiplied in a short time, and that he liked the work of taming, milking and breeding cattle. Impressed with the resume narrated by Sahadeva, King Virata employed him in his palace as the chief cowherd who supervised the maintenance and upkeep of all cows in his kingdom, while his elder brothers assumed different roles in disguise to work in Virata's court. Yudhishthira assumed the identity of game entertainer to the king and called himself Kanka, Bhima was the cook Ballava, Arjuna taught dance and music as eunuch Brihannala and dressed as a woman, and Nakula tended horses as Granthika. In Virata's kingdom, the Pandavas in disguise had an entertaining time but a war erupted when Duryodhana was trying to locate them so that he could send them back to exile again, which ultimately revealed their identity at the end of the Agnyatavasa period of one year.

When the brother-in-law of King Virata, Kichaka perished at the hands of Bhima due to his lascivious behaviour towards Draupadi, Virata was weakened. Sensing that the Pandavas were hiding in the Virata's court, Susharma, King of Trigatas and the Kauravas invaded Matsya kingdom successively. They not only captured Virata but also robbed him of his immense cattle wealth. Virata, with the help of the four Pandavas in his employment, Yudhisthira, Bhima, Nakula and Sahadeva defeated Susharma and freed King Virata. Meanwhile, the Kurus working with Susharma, robbed Virata's kingdom of sixty thousand cattle. However, they were defeated by Arjuna, with Prince Uttara, son of Virata as a charioteer. The Kurus were humiliated and returned the cattle to Virata and went back to Hastinapura. It was also the last day of the one year agnyatavasa of the Pandavas, and when they revealed their true identity to King Virata and Kauravas.

=== Kurukshetra War ===
In the great Kurukshetra War, Sahadeva played an important role from the Pandava alliance against their cousins Kauravas. The chariot flag of Sahadeva displayed a silver swan. He sounded his conch, named Manipushpaka, to signal the war's commencement, and wielded a bow called Ashwina throughout the battle. During the preparation of the war, Sahadeva suggested King Virata to be appointed as the commander-in-chief of the Pandava army, though Yudhishthira and Arjuna later opted Dhrishtadyumna for the post.

In the narrative of the battle, Sahadeva's actions recorded in the Bhishma Parva, Drona Parva, Karna Parva and Shalya Parva are as follows: (Note: The following is based on the Southern Recension of the Mahabharata)

- He initiated a duel with Durmukha (Bhishma Parva, Chapter 45, Verse 25).
- He emerged victorious over Vikarna, Shalya, and other warriors (Bhishma Parva, Chapter 71, Verse 83).
- He led to the destruction of the Kauravas' cavalry (Bhishma Parva, Chapter 89, Verse 32).
- He made a strategic withdrawal from the battlefield (Bhishma Parva, Chapter 105, Verse 16).
- He engaged in a duel with Kripacharya (Bhishma Parva, Chapter 110, Verse 12).
- He fought against Shakuni (Drona Parva, Chapter 14, Verse 22).
- He clashed once more with Durmukha (Drona Parva, Chapter 106, Verse 13).
- He was responsible for the death of Nirmitra, the Trigarta prince (Drona Parva, Chapter 107, Verse 25).
- He was defeated in combat by Karna (Drona Parva, Chapter 167, Verse 15).
- He achieved victory over Dushasana (Drona Parva, Chapter 188, Verse 2).
- He intervened in the altercation between Satyaki and Dhrishtadyumna (Drona Parva, Chapter 198, Verse 53).
- He killed Paundraja (Karna Parva, Chapter 22, Verse 14).
- He once again defeated Dushasana (Karna Parva, Chapter 23).
- He sustained injuries during a skirmish with Duryodhana (Karṇa Parva, Chapter 56, Verse 7).
- He was victorious over Uluka (Karna Parva, Chapter 61, Verse 43).
- He killed Shalya's son (Shalya Parva, Chapter 11, Verse 43).
- He slew Uluka, son of Shakuni (Shalya Parva, Chapter 28, Verse 32).
- He ultimately killed Shakuni, fulfilling his vow made after the dice game.(Shalya Parva, Chapter 28, Verse 46).

=== Later life and death ===
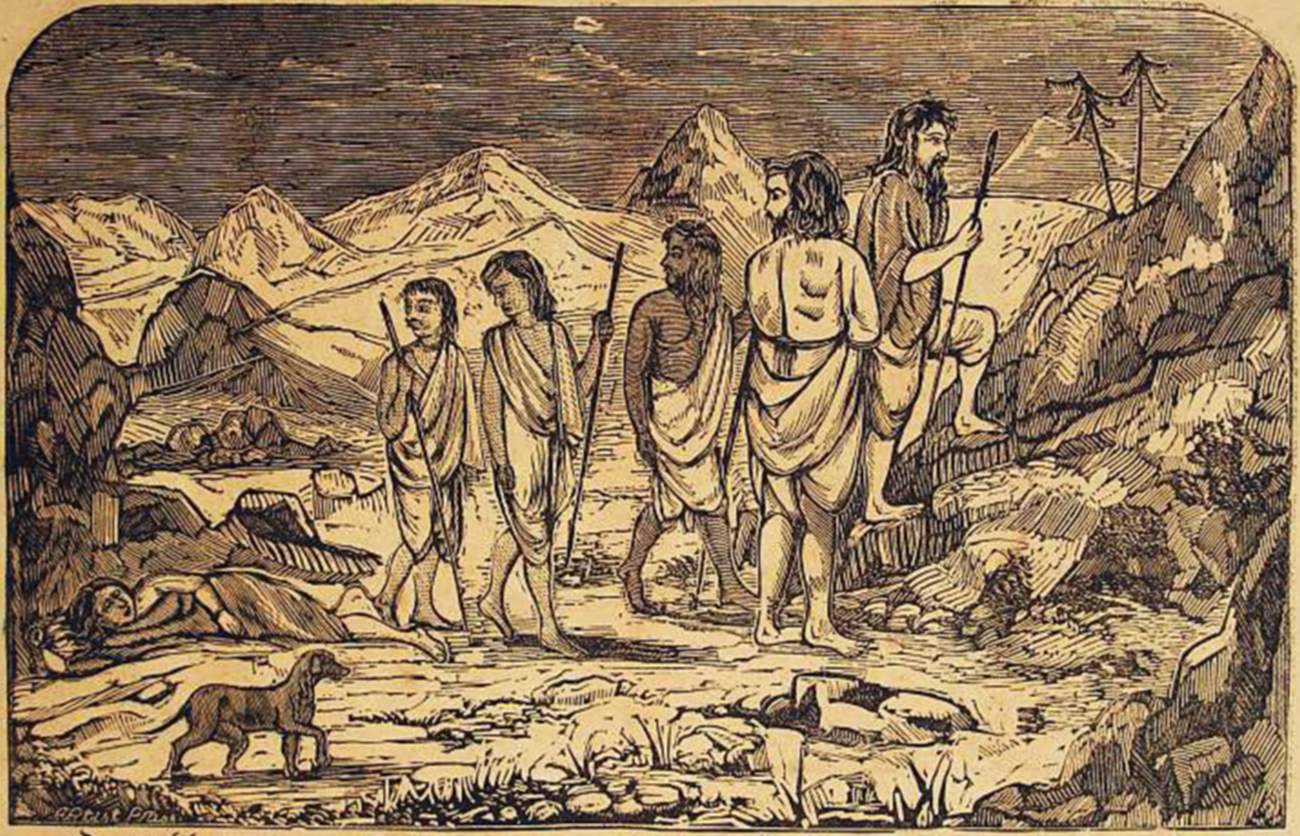
The Pandavas, accompanied by a dog, made their final journey of to the Himalayas to go to heaven and Sahadeva looks back.

Upon the onset of the Kali Yuga and the departure of Krishna, the Pandavas retired. Giving up all their belongings and ties, the Pandavas, accompanied by a dog, made their final journey of pilgrimage to the Himalayas seeking heaven. Except for Yudhishthira, all of the Pandavas grew weak and died before reaching heaven. Sahadeva was the second one to fall after Draupadi. When Bhima asked Yudhishthira why Sahadeva fell, Yudhishthira replied that Sahadeva took much pride in his wisdom.

== Associated temples ==
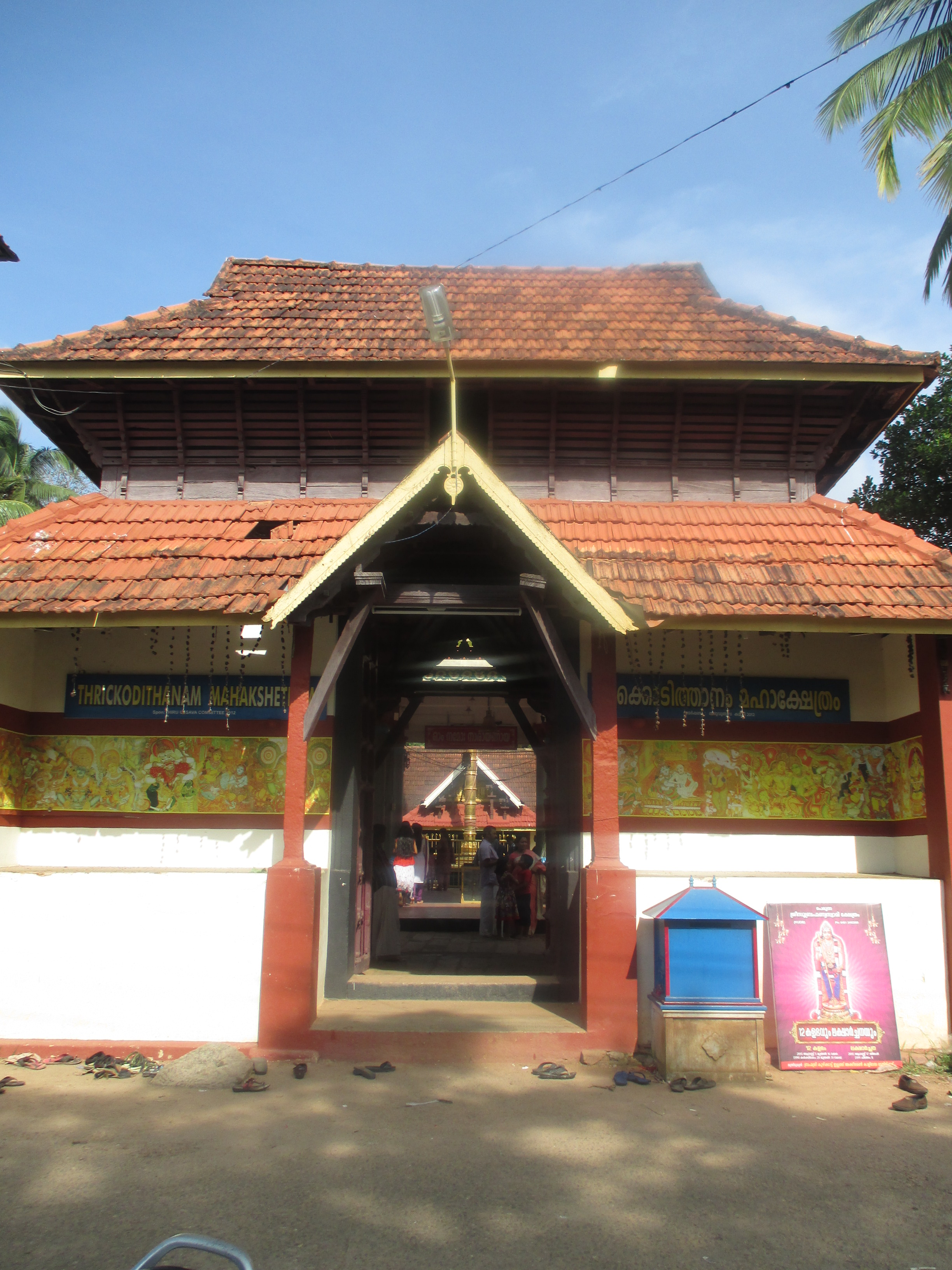
Thrikodithanam Mahavishnu Temple reported to have been built by Sahadeva

Thrikodithanam Mahavishnu Temple is one of the five ancient shrines in the Kottayam-Alappuzha-Pathanamthitta area of Kerala, connected with the legend of Mahabharata, where the five Pandavas are believed to have built one temple each. This temple has in it the Vishnu image consecrated by Sahadeva. It is one of the 108 Divya Desam temples dedicated to Krishna, an avatar of Vishnu, who is worshipped as Mahavishnu.

== In the media ==
- In Mahabharat (1988 TV series), Sanjeev Chitre acted as Sahadeva
- In 2013 version of the Mahabharata, Sahadeva was portrayed by Lavanya Bhardwaj
- In the TV show Suryaputra Karn, Suchit Vikram Singh acted as Sahadeva
- In Radhakrishn (2018–) TV show, Sahadeva was portrayed by Vikas Singh
