= Draupadeyas =

Sons of Pandavas and Draupadi in the Hindu epic Mahabharata

Draupadeyas (Sanskrit: द्रौपदेयाः, romanized: draupadeyāḥ, lit. 'sons of Draupadi') is a matronymic term referring to the five sons of Draupadi—Prativindhya, Sutasoma, Shrutakarma, Shatanika, and Shrutasena—who are characters in the ancient Hindu epic, the Mahabharata. Each of these sons was born to Draupadi through one of the five Pandava brothers, making them half-brothers to one another. The Draupadeyas are portrayed as valorous warriors, described as Maharathis, or great chariot-warriors. They align themselves with the Pandavas during the Kurukshetra War, where they are said to have slain numerous enemy combatants. While the text attributes to them the strength and ferocity of their fathers, the epic offers relatively limited individual characterisation for each of the brothers. Nonetheless, they are depicted as formidable figures on the battlefield, with only a select few warriors from the Kaurava side shown as capable of overcoming them.

== Prativindhya ==
Prativindhya (IAST: Prativindhya, Sanskrit: प्रतिविन्ध्य, lit. shining like the sun towards the Vindhyas) or Shrutavindhya (IAST: Śrutavindhya, Sanskrit: श्रुतविन्ध्य, lit. related to the Buddhi) was son of Yudhishthira and Draupadi and was the eldest of the Draupadeyas. He was described to be a skilled fighter, known to face troops like "the thunder-wielding Shakra (Indra)". In the Kurukshetra War, Prativindhya fought Shakuni. On the 9th day, Prativindhya struck Alambusha unconscious. He also rescued his father Yudhishtira from Drona showing his courage.

On 12th day, he repelled Drona who was trying to capture Yudhishthira alive.

On 14th day, he killed Dushasana's son Durmasena, who had killed Abhimanyu and took revenge. On the 14th night, he fought some of the Kauravas along with Sutasoma. On the 15th day, he stopped Ashwatthama's advance by holding him off long enough but ultimately had to retreat from the battle after being overpowered by Ashwatthama. He killed Chitra, the king of Abhisara, on the 16th day.

According to the Matsya Purana, Prativindhya had a son named Yaudheya from his first wife Subala, however he does not succeed Yudhishthira to the throne of Hastinapura as he inherits his maternal kingdom of Yaudheya.

== Sutasoma ==
Sutasoma (Sanskrit: सुतसोम, lit. one who has extracted soma or the one who has the beauty of the moon) was son of Bhima and Draupadi, second of the Draupadeyas. He also handled the troops in the war. He excelled in Mace fighting and archery. He battled the Kaurava prince Vikarna on the first day of the war. He played a major role in the battle by nearly killing Shakuni. Sutasoma, on the 12th day, stopped the advance of the mighty Kaurava Vivismati, towards Drona. He also battled some of the Kauravas on the 14th night, accompanied by his half-brother Prativindhya. He played a major role along with Yudhishthira and other Draupadeyas in holding off Dushasana and the other Kauravas on the 15th day.

== Shatanika ==
Shatanika (IAST: Śatānīka, Sanskrit: शतानीक, lit. he who has hundred troops) was the son of Nakula and Draupadi. He was the third of the Draupadeyas. He was named after a famous Rajarshi in the Kuru lineage who was considered to be an avatar of Visvedevas. He was nominated as a deputy commander-in-chief under his maternal uncle and teacher Dhrishtadyumna, in was charge of Vyuha planning. He was the strongest among the Draupadeyas. He massacred the army of Kaurava ally Bhutakarma, as well as Bhutakarma. Shatanika also defeated Kaurava prince Dushkarna on the 6th day. On the 11th day he defeated by Karna’s son Vrihasena. He defeated the Kauravas Jayatsena, Chitrasena and Shrutakarman and killed a prince of Kalinga. Shatanika caused huge destruction of the Kaurava army on the 17th day too.

== Shrutasena ==
Shrutsena (IAST: Śrutasena, Sanskrit: श्रुतसेन, lit. the commander of the army of celestials) was son of Sahadeva and Draupadi and the fourth of the Draupadeyas; like his father he was smart and intelligent. In the Chatahurdi analysis of the Mahabharata, he was defeated by Shakuni during the battle; he killed Shala, the younger brother of Bhurishravas on the 14th day of the war. He fought with other warriors like Dushmanara and Durmukha and defeated them. He also killed the son of Kaurava warrior Devavraddha.

== Shrutakarma ==
Shrutakarma (IAST: Śrutakarma, Sanskrit: श्रुतकर्म, lit. he who is known for his good deeds) was the son of Arjuna and Draupadi, and the youngest of the Draupadeyas. His horses were supposed to bear the colour of kingfishers. He was a capable archer like his father and defeated Kamboja ruler Sudakshina on the first day. He also defeated the Kaurava Jayatsena on the 6th day. He fought against Dushasana and Ashvathama in an archery duel in the battle and gave them a good fight. He killed King Chitrasena, another king of Abhisara, on the 16th day.

== Death ==
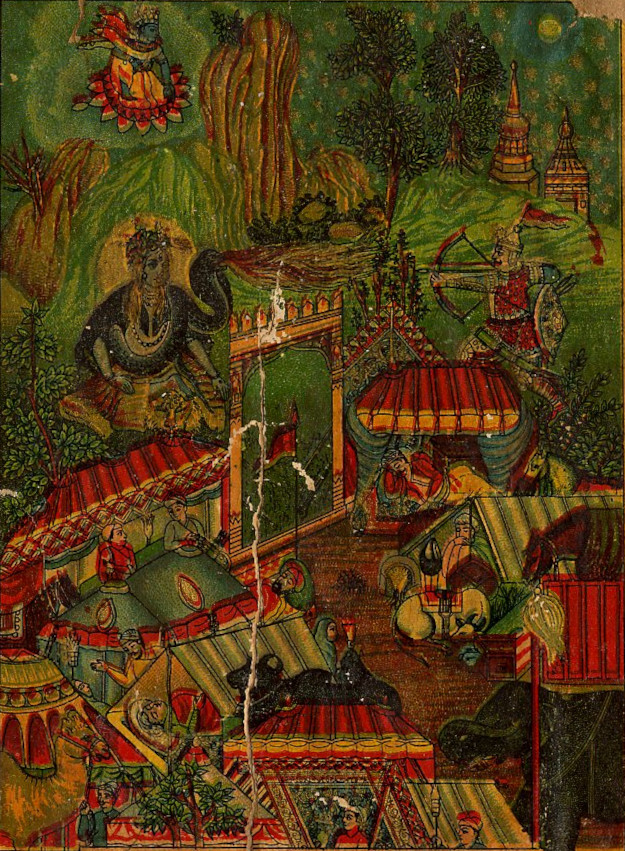
Ashwatthama prays Shiva before making a night attack on the Pandava camp

On the last night of the war after Duryodhana's death and the Kauravas' defeat, Ashvatthama gathered the only other surviving Kaurava warriors - Kritavarma and Kripa, and attacked the Pandava camp. He killed Dhrishtadyumna and many other prominent warriors of the Pandava army while they were sleeping or tried to fight him back.

Ashvatthama killed all the Draupadeyas who were awake by then along with Shikhandi when they came out of their chambers after hearing the screams of other soldiers to fight Ashvatthama. In some versions of the story, he believes them to be the five Pandava brothers due to darkness; in others, he purposefully attacks the Pandavas' heirs in order to hurt the Pandavas emotionally by destroying their lineage.

Ashwatthama was eventually cursed by Krishna for his heinous act of attempting to kill the baby Parikshit in the womb of Uttara, to roam the world for 3000 years with loneliness, incurable bruises and ulcers.

In the Jataka tales version of the Mahabharata, Parikshit's mentors included Sutasoma. Prativindhya, Shrutakarma, and Shatanika at least (who even in Sauptika Parva is shown as wounded not dead) have definite longer lives in Jatakas.
