= Kekeya kingdom =

Ancient Indian kingdom

South Asia circa 500 BCE, with location of the Kekeya kingdom, next to Gandhara.

The Kekeya kingdom (also known as Kekaya, Kaikaya, Kaikeya etc.) was a kingdom mentioned in the ancient Indian epic Mahabharata among the western kingdoms of then India. The epic Ramayana mentions one of the wives of Dasharatha, the king of Kosala and father of Rama, was from Kekeya kingdom and was known as Kaikeyi. Her son Bharata conquered the neighbouring kingdom of Gandhara and built the city of Takshasila.

In Mahabharata, a Kekaya prince was mentioned, who joined the Pandavas in the Kurukshetra War. He was the eldest among the six brothers and was described as a king known as Vrihatkshatra who is banished from his kingdom by his own kinsmen, like the Pandavas who were banished from their Kuru kingdom, by their cousin brothers viz the Kauravas headed by Duryodhana. Thus this Kekaya brother was circumstantially inclined to ally with the Pandavas. Besides this, the 6 Kekaya brothers were sons of the sister of Kunti, the mother of the Pandavas, making them cousins. In the Kurukshetra War, the Kekaya brother fought against his own kinsmen, viz the other 5 Kekaya brothers who sided with Duryodhana.

== References in Valmiki Ramayana ==
There are several references to Kaikeyi in the epic Ramayana. Kaikeyi was one of the three queens of Dasharatha, the king of Ayodhya. She was a Kekaya princess, and the daughter of Ashwapati. Ramayana testifies that the capital of Kekayas lay beyond river Sudama. River Sudama has been identified with river Saranges of Arrian which flowed also flowed through Kekians. The Vedic texts do not mention name of the capital of Kekaya but Ramayana does inform us that the Kekaya metropolis was Rajagriha or Girivraja. which A. Cunningham has identified with Girjak or Jalalpur on river Jhelum in the Jhelum district but this view has not been accepted by scholars. Ramayana further attests that Kekaya lay beyond Vipasa or Beas and abutted with the country of Gandharava or Gandhara vishaya (country). Ravana, the son of Vishrava and Kaikesi (Princess of Kaikeya may be an early predecessor of Bhagawan Rama’s Step mother) was born in Devagana.

== References in Vishnu-Dharmottara Mahapurana ==
According to Vishnu-Dharmottara Mahapurana also, the capital of the Kekayas lay beyond river Sudama which flowed some distance westwards from the Vitasta or Jhelum river. Prince Bharata, son of princess Kekayi, while going to Kekaya country from Ayodhya had to cross river Vitasta and then after crossing river Sudama, he reached the land of the Kekayas.

== References in Mahabharata ==
Kekaya is mentioned as an ancient Indian kingdom at (6,9).

=== Alliances of Kekaya brides with Puru kings ===
- Puru king Sarvabhauma married Sunanda, the daughter of the Kekaya prince, having obtained her by force. (1,95)
- Puru king Parikshit's son Bhimasena married Kumari, the princess of Kekaya and begot upon her Pratisravas whose son was Pratipa, the father of Santanu. (1,95)

=== Kekaya kings ===
==== King Sahasrachitya ====
There was a ruler of the Kekayas, named Sahasrachitya and he was the grandfather of king Satayupa, who was the contemporary of Kuru king Dhritarashtra. Abdicating his kingdom to his eldest son, king Sahasrachitya retired into the woods. (15,20)

==== King Satyayupa ====
Satayupa was the great king of the Kekayas. Having made over the sovereignty of his kingdom to his son he had come into the woods. Kuru king Dhritarashtra, after the Kurukshetra War was over, installed the victorious Pandava king Yudhishthira, on the throne of the Kuru capital, Hastinapura. He then retired to woods. Then Satayupa, received king Dhritarashtra with due rites. Accompanied by him, the latter proceeded to the retreat of Vyasa. Arrived at Vyasa’s retreat, Dhritarashtra received his initiation into the forest mode of life. Returning he took up his abode in the retreat of Satayupa. The high-souled Satayupa, instructed Dhritarashtra in all the rites of the forest mode, at the command of Vyasa. (15,19)

==== King Vrihatkhsatra ====
The Kekaya brothers (six each) who fought the Kurukshetra War, on the side of Pandavas as well as on the side of Kauravas, belonged to the next generation of Kekaya's royal family. The foremost of them was Vrihatkshatra, the eldest of the brothers who sided with the Pandavas. He was described as a king of Kekaya. He had a son named Visoka, who also fought in Kurukshetra War.

==== Kekaya bowmen Dyumatsena ====
Not much is known about this warrior from Kekaya except the following passages.

After Bhima completed his learning with Balarama, he became in strength like unto Dyumatsena himself (1,141). Dyumatsena, the chief of bowmen among the Kekayas was present in Yudhishthira's court, newly inaugurated at Indraprastha (2,3).

=== Kekaya's friendship with the Pandavas ===
The five Kekaya princes, allied with the Kauravas and Eldest sixth one allied with Pandavas and visited the Pandavas when they were banished into woods along with other Pandava allies viz Vasudeva Krishna, Dhristadyumna and Dhrishtaketu (3–12,22,51,120), (5,55).

=== The five Kekaya brothers, on the Kauravas side ===
The five Kekaya brothers who battled on the Kauravas side in Kurukshetra War is mentioned at many places (5–61,83,144).

At (5,22) is mentioned:- deposed from the throne of the Kekaya land, and desirous of being reinstated thereon, the five mighty brothers from that land, wielding mighty bows, are now following the Pandavas ready to fight. The Panchalas and the Matsyas, along with the very herdsmen that attend on their kins and sheep, are rejoicing and gladdening Yudhishthira (5–50,53). Only one Kekaya brother is on Pandavas side.

The five royal brothers of Kekaya, accepted the Kekaya warriors (on Dhritarashtra’s side) as antagonists. And in their share are included the Malavas also, and the Salwakas, as also, the two famous warriors of the Trigarta host who have sworn to conquer or die. (5,57).

The princes of Kekaya, and Dhrishtaketu, and the son of the king of the Kasis, and Srenimat, and Vasudana, and the invincible Sikhandin, all hale and hearty, cased in armour and armed with weapons and decked with ornaments, marched behind Yudhishthira (5,152).

=== The hundred Kekaya brothers on Kaurava side ===
Kekayas on Kaurava side is mentioned at many places (5–19,30,198), (6,16)

The five Kekaya brothers, (probably those who sided with Duryodhana) were equated with the five Asuras viz Ayahsira, Aswasira, Aysanku, Gaganamurdhan, and Vegavat. (1,67)

Jayadratha (the brother-in-law of Duryodhana), assisted by the Kekayas, endeavoured to ravish Draupadi (the wife of Pandavas) (11,22)

The five royal brothers, the princes of Kekaya, hastened to Duryodhana with an Akshauhini of troops, and gladdened his heart. (5,19). Kekayas were mentioned along with the Vasatis, the Salwakas, the Amvashthas, and the Trigartas as allies of Duryodhana at (5,30). The Kekayas on the Kaurava side marched under Drona along with Vinda and Anuvinda, both of Avanti and the Vahlikas. (5,198). 100 Kekaya brothers were generals in the Kaurava army along with others like Vinda and Anuvinda, of Avanti (6,16).

The camp of the Kekayas used to have loud sound of song and slapping of palms which their soldiers, engaged in dance and revelry, used to make. (7,84)

=== The appearance of Kekaya brothers on Pandava side ===
The Kekaya brothers, were all of the hue of Indragopaka insects (mix of red and black colors) (5,141). All of them had purple flags (5,57). The five Kekaya brothers, resembling (in hue) the insects called Indragopakas, had red coats of mail, red weapons and red banners. (7,10). The five Kekaya brothers were borne by steeds of deep red hue. They were of the splendour of gold and had standards of the red hue, and were decked with chains of gold (7,23).

The Kekaya brother is lying on the ground, slain by Drona. Their coats of mail, of the splendour of heated gold, and their tall standards and cars and garlands, all made of the same metal, are shedding a bright light on the earth like so many blazing fires. (11,25)

=== Kekayas in Kurukshetra War ===
The Kekayas are said to have fought on both sides in the Kurukshetra War. The five Kekaya princes, led by their elder brother Vrihatkshatra, had joined the Pandava army while other Kekaya brothers opposed Vrihatkshatra had sided with the Kauravas. The other numerous kingdoms of ancient India viz. Dwaraka, Kasi, Magadha, Matsya, Mahishmati, Chedi, Pandya and the Yadus of Mathura were allies of Pandavas while the allies of the Kauravas were nations of Pragjyotisha, Anga, Kekaya, Sindhudesa, Avanti in Madhyadesa, Madras, Gandhara, Bahlika, Kamboja (with Yavanas, Sakas, Tusharas) and many others had sided with Kauravas.

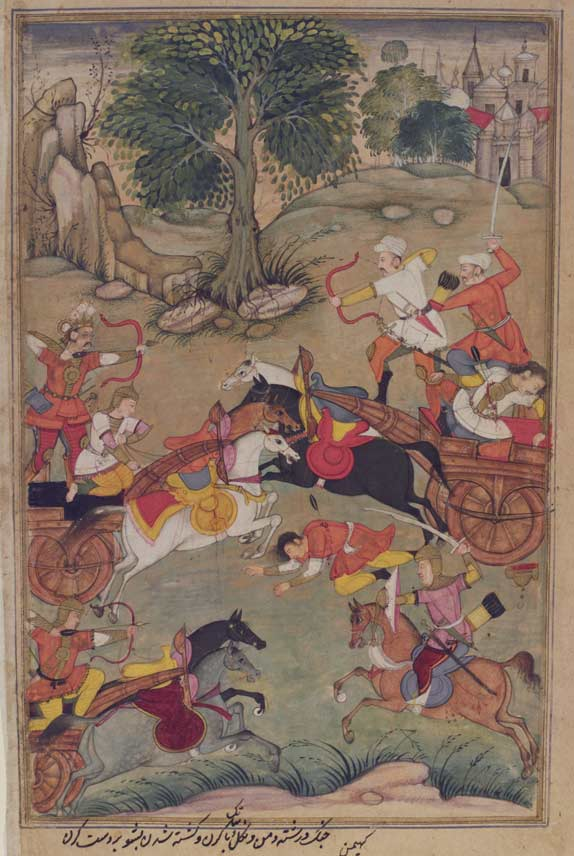
Karna Slays the Kaikeya Prince Vishoka-Razmnama

Mahabharata associates the Kekaya peoples with the Madras (Madraschasca saha Kekayaiha). Madra-Kekayah

==== On Pandava side ====
(7–21,83,107), (8–3) Yudhamanyu and Uttamaujas, became protectors of Arjuna’s car-wheels, along with the Kekaya brothers, and Dhrishtaketu, and Chekitana of great valour. (6,19). The Kekaya brothers at the head of their troops, encountered in battle the five Gandhara princes with their troops. (6,45).

- Kekaya king is mentioned as fighting for the Pandavas at (6,52).
- The king of the Kekayas, owning an akshauhini, formed the right wing of a Pandava battle-array (6,69). The five Kekaya brothers consisted the left wing of another array at another day of the war (6,75)
- Dushasana fought with the five Kekaya brothers. (6,79)
- The chief of the Kekayas, who was equal to Bhima himself in battle and surrounded by Kekaya warriors, has been slain by Kekaya, the brother by the brother. (8,6)
- 1700 Kekaya troops, skilled in smiting, united with a body of the Panchala troops checked the Kauravas trying to capture Yudhishthira. (8,62)
- Drona, with his swift-going shafts, slew all the Kaikeyas (7,152)
- The five Kekaya brothers are lying on the ground, slain by Drona. (11,25)

===== Battles of Vrihadkshatra =====
Kripa rushed against Vrihadkshatra, the ruler of the Kaikeyas. (6,45). Excellent steeds of the Sindhu breed, of beautiful limbs, and of the hue of the smoke of straw, quickly bore the Kaikeya prince, Vrihatkshatra. (7,23). Vrihatkshatra and others rushed against Drona (7,33). The mighty car-warrior among the Kaikeyas, viz., Vrihatkshatra, incessantly scattering keen shafts that resembled the thunder in force, proceeded towards Drona; then Kshemadhurti of great fame quickly rushed against Vrihatkshatra (7,103). Having slain his foe, Kshemadhurti, the mighty car-warrior Vrihatkshatra became filled with joy (7,104). Vrihadkshatra and others rushed against Ashwatthama (7,198).

===== Death of Vrihatkshatra =====
The mighty car-warrior of the Kaikeyas, Vrihatkshatra the eldest of five brothers, rushed against Drona, the generalissimo of the Kauravas. He baffled Drona's Brahma weapon with his Brahmna weapon. Drona, with a third shaft well-shot from his bow, pierced Vrihatkshatra himself in the chest. Thereupon, the latter, thus struck in the chest, fell down from his car, slain. (7,122).(8,5)

===== Death of Kekaya Prince Visoka and Kekaya commander Ugrakarman =====
Karna slew Visoka, the son of the ruler of the Kaikayas. Upon the slaughter of the Kaikaya prince, the commander of the Kaikaya division, Ugrakarman, rushed with speed and striking Prasena, Karna's son. Then Karna, with three crescent-shaped arrows, cut off the arms and the head of his son’s assailant. (8,82)

==== On Kaurava side ====
The Abhishahas, the Surasenas, the Sivis, and the Vasatis, the Salwas, the Matsyas, the Amvashtas, the Trigartas, and the Kekayas, the Sauviras, the Kitavas, and the dwellers of the Eastern, Western, and the Northern countries,--these twelve brave races protected the Kaurava generalissimo, Bhishma. (6,18)

- Kekayas along with the Trigartas, the Matsyas (Matsays in the western region) and the Vatadhanas were mentioned as part of the Kaurava army at (6,56)
- The Trigartas and the Madras, with the Kekayas, numbering 25000 urged by Duryodhana, surrounded Arjuna (6,61)
- The mighty car-warrior, the son of the ruler of the Kaikeyas stayeth on the field for battling for Duryodhana's sake. (8,6)

=== Kekaya and Avanti ===
At some places in Mahabharata, people of Avanti is mentioned as Kekayas. This could be an oral-transmission error crept into Mahabharata, or a translation error, or could mean some tribal-link between Avanti and Kekaya. Similar to other western rulers, like the Kambojas, the Kekayas also had migrated to east, hence in principle, could reach Avanti. In fact, in Ramayana, there is some indication of a Kekaya kingdom in the eastern sea-shore !

- Vinda and Anuvinda of Avanti, with their troops encountered Virata, the ruler of Matsyas at the head of his forces. That awful encounter between the Matsyas and the Kekayas was terrible. (7,23).
- Satyaki (a Pandava general, belonging to the Yadava clan, who was a disciple in arms, of Arjuna) checked the Kaikaya princes Vinda and Anuvinda. The two Kaikaya princes, in that battle, shrouded Satyaki. Satyaki shrouded the Kaikaya brothers. Satyaki cut the head of Anuvinda with a razor arrow, sorrowing the Kaikeyas. Satyaki next slew Vinda in a sword fight. Amazingly these Vinda and Anuvinda resemble in name to the two other princes named Vinda and Anuvinda who were from Avanti. They however were slain by Arjuna (7,96)

=== Other references ===
- A lady named Sumana of Kekaya’s race is mentioned at (13,123)
- Conversation of Kaikeya King and a Rakshasa is mentioned at (12,76)

== References in Bhagavata Purana ==
There are several references to the Kekayas in the Bhagavatam Purana.

The five Kekaya brothers were the sons of Kunti's sister Srutakirti, wedded to Kekaya king Dhristaketu. Srutakirti, who was also a sister of Vasudeva, and Dhristaketu were also the parents of Bhadra, who married her cousin, Krishna. Kunti's sister Srutadevi was wedded to the Karusha king Vriddhasarma, whose son was Dantavakra. Kunti's sister Srutasravas was married to the Chedi king Damaghosha whose son was Shishupala. Kunti's sister Rajadhidevi was married to the Avanti king. (Bhagavata Purana, Canto 9, Chapter 24 (The history of Yadavas), Verses 37–40)

=== Kekayas visit Samantapancaka ===
Bhagavata Purana attests that the prince of Kekaya along with princes from Matsya, Kosala, Vidharbha, Kuru, Srnjaya, Kamboja, Uśīnara, Madra, Kunti, Anarta, Kerala was present at Samanta-pancaka in Kurukshetra at the occasion of the solar eclipse. .

=== Kekayas join Rajasuya of Yudhishthira ===
Bhagavata Purana also testifies that the Kekayas and other nation like those of the Yadus, Srnjayas, Kurus and Kambojas had participated in the Rajasuya sacrifice of Yudhishthira. "The massed armies of the Yadus, Srnjayas, Kambojas, Kurus, Kekayas and Kosalas made the earth tremble as they followed Yudhishthira Maharaja, the performer of the Rajasuya sacrifice, in procession" .

=== Kekayas fight Yadavas ===
The Kekayas, Madras and Kambojas from north are stated to have sided with king Jarasandha of Magadha and had participated in a war against Krishna and his Yadava army .

=== Other references in Bhagavata Purana ===
Kekays had participated in the marriage ceremony of Rukmini, queen consort of Krishna, the daughter of Bhishmaka, the king of Vidarbha. One of the wives of Krishna was a Kekaya princess. When Krishna was going to Mithila, the Kekays had met him with presents.

== Traditional origin of Kekayas ==
Bhagavata Purana further states that the Usinaras, the Sibi, the Madras, and the Kekayas were the direct descendants of Yayati's son Anu. Sibi or Sivi is stated to be son of Usinara

The same tradition is also furnished by other Puranic texts like Vayu Purana and Matsya Purana as well. The Anavas, derived from Anu, were a tribe of the Rigvedic period.

== Kekays in Pāṇini's Ashtadhyayi ==
Pāṇini refers to the Kaikeyas or Kekayas in his Ashtadhyayi and mentions their land as a part of the Vahika country. The other three countries which formed parts of the Vahika land were the Madra, the Usinara and the Savasa lands.

== Jain accounts ==
The Jain texts say that one half of the Kekaya was Aryan and refer to the Kekaya city called Seyaviya.

== See also ==
- Mahajanapadas
