= Jatasura =

Supernatural character in the Mahabharata

Jatasura (Sanskrit: जटासुर, romanized: Jaṭāsura) is a rakshasa in the Hindu epic Mahabharata. He disguises himself as a Brahmin and attempts to abduct three of the Pandava brothers, Yudhishthira, Sahadeva, and Nakula, and their common wife, Draupadi. He is slain by Bhima.

== Legend ==
According to the Mahabharata, Jatasura appeared in the guise of a Brahmin to the Pandavas. His goal was to gain their confidence in order to seize their weapons, and ravish their common wife, Draupadi. One day, when Bhima was away, Jatasura assumed a monstrous form. He seized the weapons and also abducted Yudhishthira, Sahadeva, Nakula, and Draupadi. Sahadeva managed to escape from his grasp, and rushed to seek the aid of Bhima. Yudhishthira confused their captor by showering him with moral accusations, observing Jatasura's lack of intelligence. Bhima arrived on the scene and prepared to wrestle the rakshasa on his own, discouraging assistance from Nakula and Sahadeva. The Pandava and the rakshasa fought with gigantic trees, large rocks, along with their arms. In the end, Bhima was able to inflict a death blow on his opponent's neck. When Jatasura grew faint, Bhima lifted him up and dashed him with force to the ground, shattering his limbs. Striking him with his elbow, Bhima decapitated the rakshasa. Having slain Jatasura, Bhima presented himself before Yudhishthira, gaining his praise.

== See also ==
- Hidimba
- Kirmira
- Bakasura
