= Prasthala =

Capital of king Susharman of Trigarta Kingdom

Prasthala was the capital city of king Susharman of the Trigarta Kingdom. As per the epic Mahabharata, this city was under the constant attack of Matsya kings like the king Virata. Susharman tried to avenge the Matsyas with the help of Duryodhana of Hastinapura, but the attempt was foiled by the Pandavas staying in the domains of the Matsyas. Prasthala is either identified to be the modern city Patiala in Punjab, India or Jalandhar in Punjab, India.
