= Sivi kingdom =

Ancient Indian kingdom

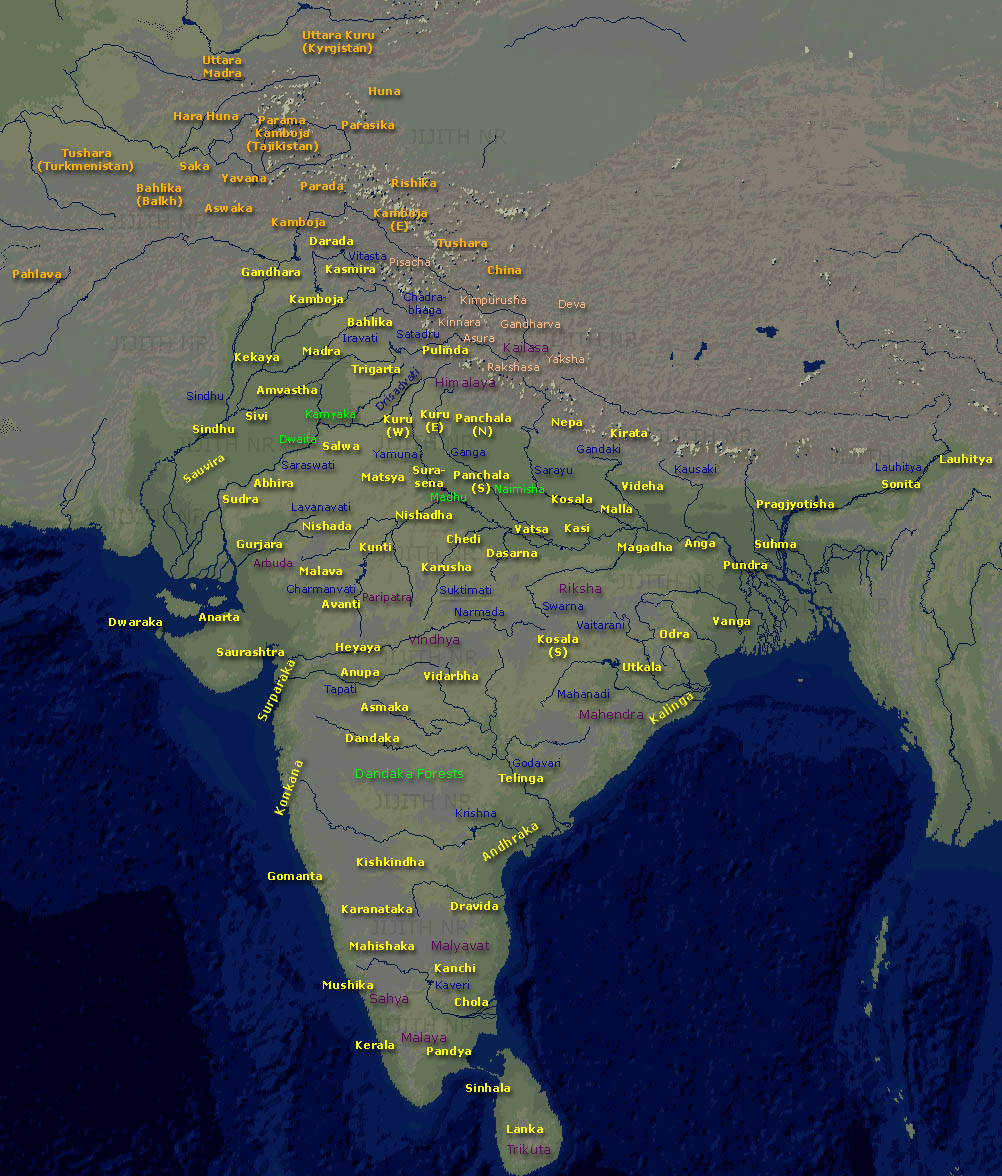
Shows the Kingdoms mentioned in Indian epics.

Shivi (alias Sibi, Shibi, Sivi) is mentioned as a kingdom and as the name of a king in the ancient Indian epic Mahabharata. There was a king named Shivi who became famous as Shivi or the kingdom itself may be named after him. Shivi (alias Sibi, Saivya) king was famous for his truthfulness. The legend about his truthfulness and compassion goes as follows: King Shivi protected a dove who was chased by a hawk (which wanted to eat the dove as its midday meal), and gave flesh from his thigh, as a substitute meal to the hawk.

== Geographical locations ==
According to Sivi Játaka, king Sivi (as Bodhisatta) had ruled Sivirattha with his capital at Aritthapura (Aristapura of Sanskrit) and is said to have donated his eyes to a blind Brahmana In the Mahabharata, the name Sivi is connected with Asura and like Kamboja, it is also linked to the goddess Diti. The Brahmanical texts also mentions that king Sivi was son of king Usinara and was from Anava (Anu) lineage.

Mahabharata refers to the Kambojas as Munda ("shaved-headed soldiery"). In the same Mahabharata text, Rudra Siva is also given the epithet of Munda. The Kambojas are also attested to have been ardent worshipers of Siva-cult (Munda-cult).

In fact, the Mahabharata evidence shows that the promulgator of worship of Siva was one sage Upamanyu, son of Vyaghrapada. Upamanyu was a disciple of Ayodha Dhaumya who taught at Taxila University in Gandhara. The northern Kamboja affinities of this Upamanyu (the epic promulgator of Synthetic Siva cult) are indicated and have been accepted since his son/or descendant Aupamanyava is specifically referred to as Kamboja in the Vamsa Brahmana of the Samaveda. Since "Munda" is an epithet of god Rudra-Siva, it has also been suggested that the Sivis derive their name from god Siva whom they ardently worshiped.

Taking clue from Yaska's Nirukta, S. Levi states that "the Kambhojas were a branch of the Bhojas and were not a part of the Aryas. The name "Kambhojas" is etymologised as Kamblala + Bhojas ("the Bhojas with Kambalas or blankets") as well as Kamniya + Bhojas (meaning "The handsome Bhojas or the desirable Bhojas"). Thus, Levi and others have connected the ancient Bhojas with the Kambhojas. Both Kambojas and the Bhojas are also referred to as north-western people in the 13th Rock Edict of king Asoka. Thus, the Kambojas appear to have either been anciently and inadvertently confused with the Bhojas who were a Yadava tribe, or, else, there was indeed some kind of link between the Bhojas and the ancient Kambhojas as S. Levi suggests. Writers like James F. K. Hewitt and others also connect the Sivis, Bhojas and the Drhuyus with the Kambhojas. The Chinese evidence on king Sivi as well as king Vessantara (Sudana, Saniraja or Pi-lo of the Chinese records), the rulers of Oddiyana (in pre-Buddhist times) also seems to lend a fair credence in this direction.

== Mention in Mahabharata ==
South Asia circa 500 BCE, with location of the Sivi kingdom in the Indus Valley.

It is also mentioned in the epic that Jayadratha was the king of Sindhu, Sauvira and Shivi kingdoms. Probably Sauvira and Shivi were two kingdom close to the Sindhu kingdom and Jayadratha conquered them, which would place Shivi somewhere in western Rajasthan though alternatively it could also be Sibi, Balochistan which is to the west of Sauvira and Sindhu and adjacent to both. Jayadratha was an ally of Duryodhana and husband of Duryodhana's sister Dussala.

It is also mentioned that Yudhishthira, king of Hastinapur after the great Kurukshetra War, married a beautiful girl Devika of the Sivi tribe, and she later begot a son to him, Yaudheya, from whom the Yaudheyas claim their descent.

== See also ==
- Kingdoms of Ancient India
