= Susharma =

Mahabharata character

Sushama

Information
- Weapon: Bow and Arrow
- Family: Chirangada (uncle)

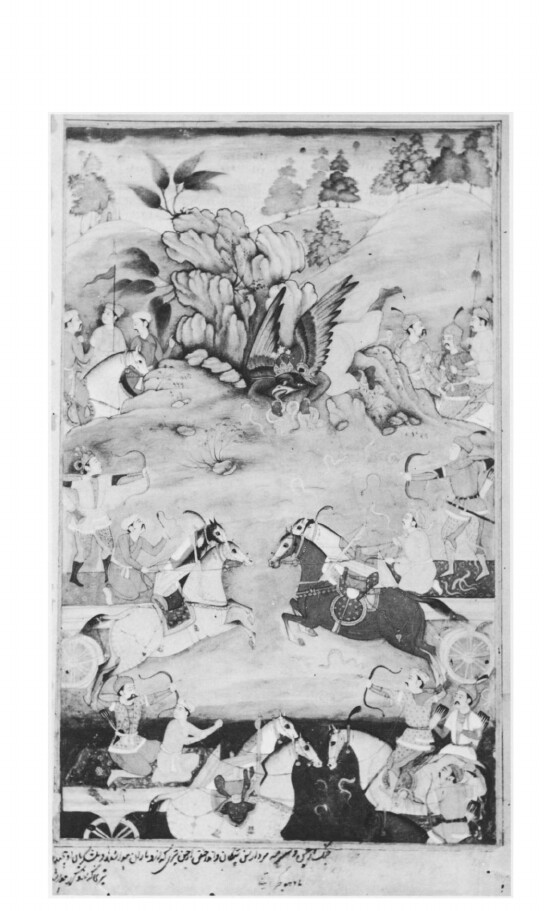
Susharma releases the weapon suparna, Madhu Gujrati, Folio of Razmnama at Baroda.

Susharma (Sanskrit: सुशर्मा, romanized: Suśarmā) is the king of Trigarta in the Hindu epic Mahabharata. He was the brave Archer and a Competitor of Arjuna who vowed to either die or kill Arjuna as a part of a larger plan by Duryodhana to capture Yudhishthira alive in Kurukshetra war. For this, he used the Samsaptak Shakti against Arjuna's Nagastra on the 8th day of the battle of Kurukshetra and also formed a suicide squad on 11th night of the war. On the 13th day of the battle, he kept Arjuna distracted from the Chakravyuh, even though he knew that he could not defeat Arjuna. He was assigned this task because the Kaurava commander Dronacharya had created the Chakravyuh to capture Yudhishthira and no one in the Pandava army knew how to break the Chakravyuh except Arjuna. Fearless Susharma was killed along with his brothers by Arjuna in the battle of the same day.

== Legend ==
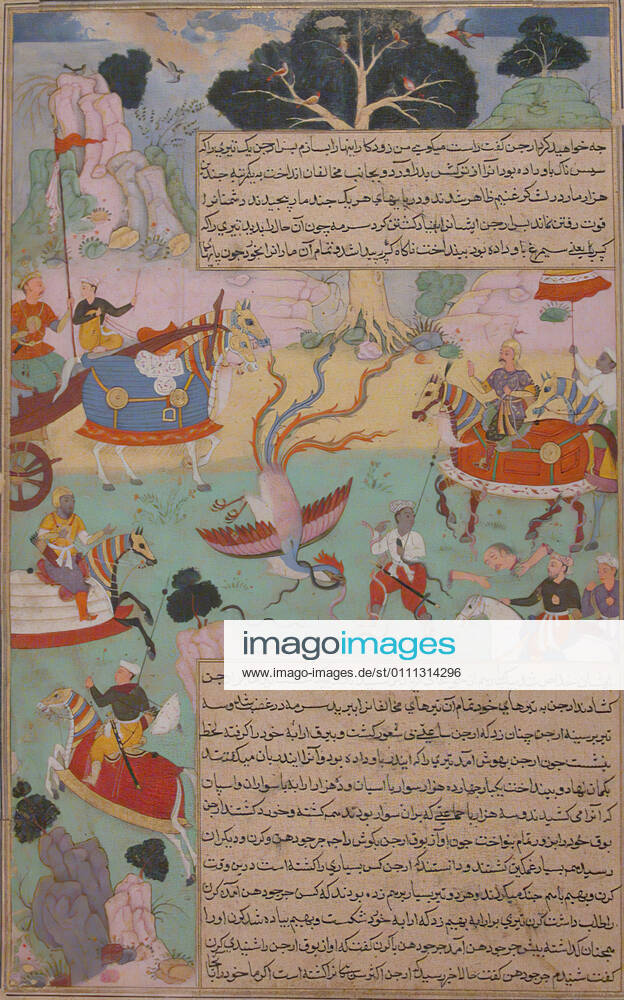
Fighting Arjuna, Susarma Unleashes the Suparna Weapon which Invokes Garuda, Folio from a Razmnama

During the Kurukshetra War, Susharma attacked Virata, the king of the Matsya Kingdom, but was eventually defeated by Bhima. Just as Arjun possessed the Gandhiv bow, he also had a bow called Raktabeej, enabling him to cause significant destruction during the Mahabharata and Virata wars. Susharma was responsible for distracting Arjuna on the thirteenth day of the war. On the thirteenth day, Drona instructed the Kaurava forces to organise in a chakravyuha formation to kill Yudhishthira. Aware that Arjuna and Krishna knew how to break the formation, Susharma distracted them, ensuring that they would be on the other side of the chakravyuha. He was killed by Arjuna on the final day of the war while the rest of his army was retreating.
