= Jayadratha =

Character in the Mahabharata

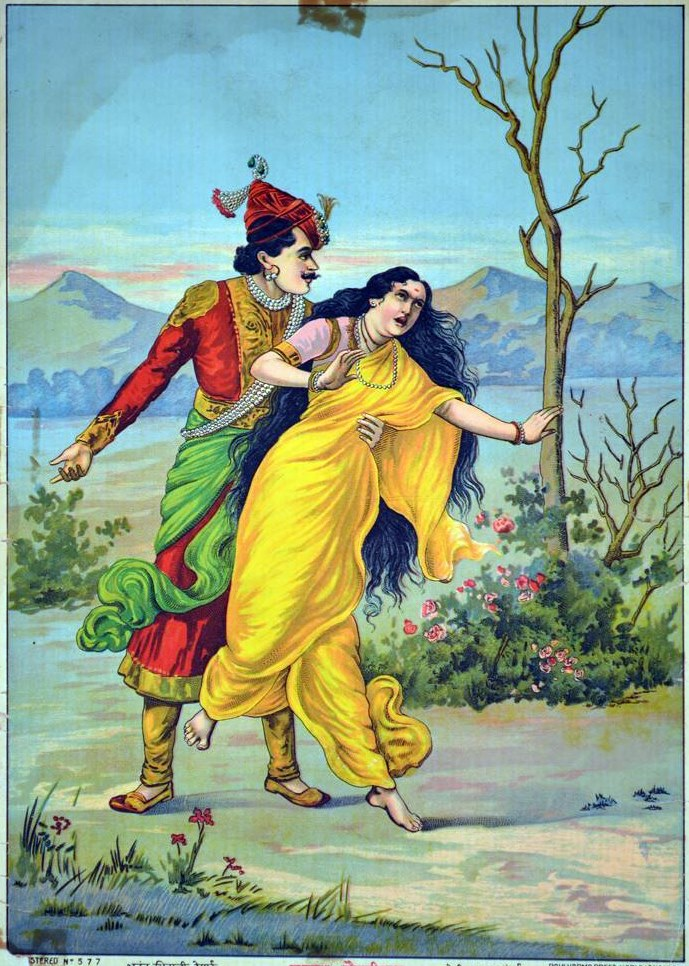
- Jayadratha tries to kidnap Draupadi, painting by Raja Ravi Varma

Information
- Family: Vriddhakshatra (father)
- Spouses: Duhshala (chief-consort); Princesses of Kamboja and Yavana
- Children: Suratha
- Home: Sindhu

Jayadratha (Sanskrit: जयद्रथ, romanized: Jayadratha) is the king of the Sindhu kingdom featured in the Mahabharata The son of the king Vriddhakshatra. He was married to Dushala, the only sister of the hundred Kaurava brothers. He is killed by Arjuna. He has a son named Suratha.

== Etymology ==
The word Jayadratha is derived from two Sanskrit words, jayat meaning 'victorious' and ratha meaning 'chariot'. Thus the word Jayadratha means, 'victorious chariot warrior’. His other names are

- Sindhuraja (सिन्धुराज) - King of Sindhu Rivers
- Saindhava (सैन्धव) - Chief of Sindhus / (king) of Sindhu Kingdom

== Legend ==
=== Previous birth ===
Indeed, their joy was as great as that of Indra and Vishnu when those two gods, desirous of slaying Jambha, obtained the permission of Bhava that slayer of great Asuras.

— Mahabharata, Drona Parva, Section LXXXI

Jayadratha is indirectly mentioned as rebirth of Jambha in Drona Parva of the epic.

=== Abduction of Draupadi ===
One day, during the time the Pandavas were in exile, the Pandavas went hunting to gather food. They left Draupadi alone at the ashram and requested Sage Trunabindu and Dhaumya to watch over her. On that day, Jayadratha saw Draupadi and sent his minister Kotikasya to inquire as to who she was. Kotikasya went over to her and after learning about her identity, informed Jayadratha that she was Draupadi, the wife of the Pandavas. Jayadratha in spite of learning her identity went to Draupadi and proposed to marry her. Initially welcoming him as the Pandavas' brother-in-law, Draupadi vehemently refused his proposal. Infuriated, Jayadratha abducted Draupadi and started moving towards his kingdom.

The Pandavas returned to their ashrama and found Draupadi missing and learned about the event that had unfolded by the account of Draupadi's friend Dhatreyika, who had witnessed Jayadratha forcefully carrying Draupadi away. Yudhishthira then ordered his younger brothers to rescue Draupadi. They rushed in their chariots towards Jayadratha and his host with great fury and started to slay all of his soldiers. When Jayadratha, the King of Sindhu, saw that his warriors were slain, he became anxious, and in confusion, leaving Draupadi there, fled for his life.

Yudhishthira returned with Draupadi while commanding his brothers to pursue Jayadratha but not kill him. On learning that the enemy was a full two miles ahead of them, Arjuna uses a divine weapon to kill Jayadratha's horses. Bhima seized Jayadratha by his hair, slammed him on the ground with violence, and started to kick him on his head until Arjuna reminds him of Yudhishthira's words. Suppressing his wrath, Bhima shaves the hair of the prince's head, leaving five tufts in as many places. Thrusting him in a chariot in chains, they returned to their other brothers and asked Draupadi for Jayadratha's fate. Draupadi, thinking of her sister-in-law, suggests that he was already treated like a slave and so should be released as an act of mercy. So bowing down to the merciful Yudhishthira, Jayadratha returned to his capital.

=== Kurukshetra war ===
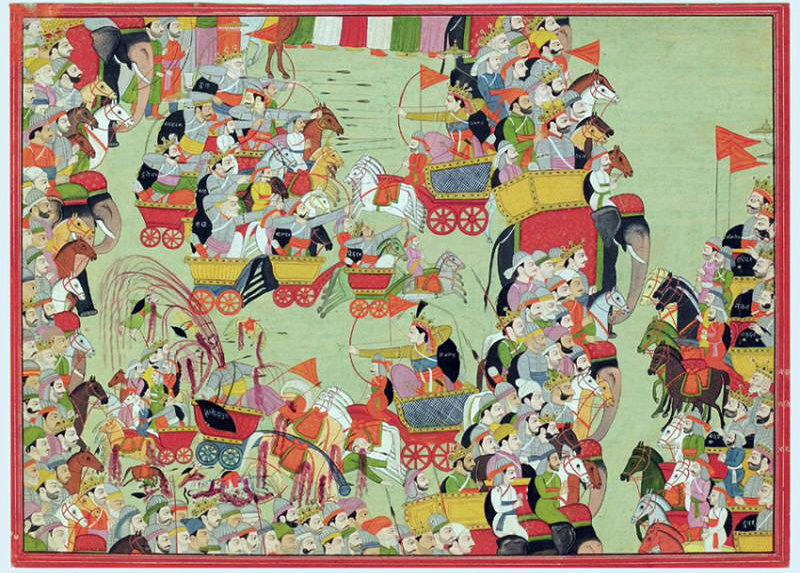
Abhimanyu fights the Kauravas in the chakrayudha (left), while Jayadratha on the elephant on the right prevents the Pandavas from aiding Abhimanyu.

After his humiliation at the hands of Pandavas, Jayadratha gave control of his kingdom to his wife and did severe penance towards Lord Shiva. Pleased with his austerities, Shiva appears before him and grants him a boon. Jayadratha asks for the ability to defeat all five Pandavas. However, Shiva told him that this was impossible. Still, Jayadratha implores him for any help in avenging himself. Reluctantly, Shiva grants him the boon that while he will not be able to defeat the Pandavas, for one day, he will be able to check their advance. Saying these words, Shiva warns Jayadratha that even this boon could not hold Arjuna as he has Krishna as his charioteer. Satisfied, Jayadratha returns to his kingdom and went to the battlefield on Day 11. Jayadratha fights on the side of the Kauravas in the Kurukshetra War.

On the 11th day, Jayadratha defeated Drupada and his Panchala forces. Then he is defeated by Abhimanyu in a sword fight who came in aid of Drupada and Jayadratha is forced to flee. On the 13th day, when the chakravyuha is launched by Dronacharya, Abhimanyu manages to enter the formation; he intends for the Pandava forces to follow after him and smash the formation from the inside. However, Jayadratha moves to close the gap, and Shiva's boon triggers as he is able to hold all of the Pandava brothers and their allies at bay. As part of the Kaurava strategy, Arjuna and Krishna are busy battling Susharma and the Trigata Army. With no aid, Abhimanyu is trapped and brutally killed by the Kauravas.

Abhimanyu's death is a gigantic blow to the Pandavas. In particular, Draupadi, Yudhishthira, and Bhima feel very guilty for not killing Jayadratha when they did have the chance. Arjuna blames Jayadratha to be the cause for Abhimanyu's death and vows to kill him the very next day before sunset, vowing that if he fails he would immolate himself.

=== Death ===
Dronacharya arranged a combination of three vyuhas in order to protect Jayadratha from Arjuna: The Shakata vyuha (the cart formation), the Suchimukha Vyuha (the needle formation), and finally the Padma Vyuha (the lotus formation). Bhima, Satyaki, and Arjuna tear through the Kaurava army. But as the war rages, it becomes clear that Arjuna could not reach him before sunset. At a climactic moment, with the sun nearly set and thousands of warriors still between Arjuna and Jayadratha, Krishna sends his Sudarshana Chakra in order to obscure the sun and create an illusion of sunset. The Kaurava warriors rejoice over Arjuna's defeat and look forward to his imminent burning. Jayadratha is relieved that he was saved and comes out of the formation to mock Arjuna. With Jayadratha now in Arjuna's reach, Krishna frees the sun from his illusion and points out Jayadratha, telling Arjuna to decapitate him with a divine arrow that would carry the severed head far and drop it into the lap of Jayadratha's father. Arjuna quickly decapitates him. Jayadratha's head is taken with the arrow far from the battlefield, finally landing on the lap of his father, Vridhakshatra.

His father had been granted a boon that whosoever would be responsible for his son's severed head falling onto the ground would have his own head burst into a hundred pieces. Therefore, when Vridhakshatra, horrified at having his son's head fall in his lap hurriedly got up, it fell to the ground, killing Vridhakshatra himself at that very moment.

=== Succession ===
However, a few years later, after Yudhishthira becomes the king, he performs the ashvamedha yagna. He sends an army to guard the horse, with Arjuna as the commander-in-chief. Arjuna soon marches towards Sindhu Kingdom, and when this news reaches the Suratha (Jayadratha's son), he dies of a heart attack, fearing that it will be impossible for him to face Arjuna. When Arjuna reaches Sindhu, he hears of what happened, and feeling bad for Dushshala, he installs Suratha's infant son as the next heir of Sindhu and returns without a battle.
