= Trigarta =

Ancient Indo-Aryan kingdom

Trigarta was an ancient Indo-Aryan kingdom based in the region between Jalandhar and Kangra. According to the ancient Indian epic Mahabharata, its king Susarman, who ruled the kingdom from Prasthala, participated in the Kurukshetra War.

== Geography ==
Prior to the Muslim period in the Indian subcontinent, Trigarta encompassed the territory situated between the Sutlej and Ravi rivers in the outer hills, extending to the Jalandhar Doab in the south, as outlined by J. Ph. Vogel. Their territory held two principal capitals, Kangra and Jalandhar.

The etymology of Trigarta has been understood to mean 'The Land of the Three Rivers', referring to the Sutlej, Ravi and Beas in modern-day Punjab. However, it has also been thought to represent the three tributaries of the Beas in the Kangra district.

== History ==
=== Ancient ===
The earliest documented reference to Trigarta is found in the works of Pāṇini, in which he characterizes it as a martial republic consisting of a confederation of six states. As per the Mahabharata, Trigarta encompassed seven states, indicating the possibility that one state had either seceded from the union or amalgamated with another state.

The Audumbaras, a neighbouring tribal group, are mentioned in the Vishnu Purana as being linked with the Trigarta. J. Ph. Vogel notes that during the Early Ghaznavid period, remnants of the Audumbaras persisted, referred to in its corrupt form by Al-Biruni as "Dahamala", suggesting a fusion of the Audumbaras with the Trigarta.

==== Mahabharata ====
Trigarta is mentioned in the epic Mahabharata. It mentions two different Trigarta kingdoms: one in the west, close to the Sivi kingdom, and the other north of the Kuru kingdom. Modern Kangra is one of the ancient towns in North Trigarta, extending westward to the Punjab area. Multan was the capital of Trigarta, with its original name being Mulasthan. The territory of Trigarta kingdom is around the three rivers of Sutlej, Beas, and Ravi. Trigarta kings were allies of Duryodhana and enemies of the Pandavas and Viratas. Their capital was named Prasthala. They attacked the Virata kingdom aided by the Kurus to steal cattle from there. The Pandavas living there in anonymity helped the Viratas to resist the combined forces of Trigartas and Kurus. Trigarta kings fought the Kurukshetra War and were killed by Arjuna, after a ruthless and bloody conflict. Arjuna also annihilated an akshauhini (a large military unit) of Trigarta warriors called the Samsaptakas. These warriors had vowed to either die or kill Arjuna as part of a larger plan by Duryodhana to capture Yudhishthira alive.

Trigarta next finds mention in the Mahabharata's Sabha Parva, where it is included along with a number of other states of the time. According to the historical consensus, the Mahabharata was first penned down around the 4th century B.C. and continued to be written until the 4th century A.D. having existed in oral form prior to this. The founder of Trigarta is mentioned as Susarma/Susharman in the Mahabharata. He is credited with building the Kangra Fort (Nagarkot) and Kangra was originally called Susarmapura by a variety of Sanskrit, Buddhist, Jain sources prior to the Muslim period.

==== Other texts ====
Along with the Greeks, the following groups were described as Vratya-Kshatriyas (fallen Kshatriyas): Dravida, Abhira, Sabara, Kirata, Malava, Sibi, Trigarta, and Yaudheya. Historians note several references to Trigarta in the period between its mention by Pāṇini in the 5th century B.C. and the 5th century A.D., when Samudragupta invaded Trigarta along with various other kingdoms.

=== Medieval ===
==== Xuanzang ====
After Samudragupta, the next reference to Trigarta comes from Xuanzang, who records that Jalandhar was ruled by Udito. Xuanzang visited Jalandhara in 635 A.D. and noted that the country measured about 1,000 li (approximately 267 km) from north to south.

==== Chamba inscription and invasion by Ghazni ====
In the 8th century A.D., the Trigarta rulers acknowledged the supremacy of the Karkota dynasty of Kashmir, a fact also recorded in the Rajatarangini. From the 9th to the 11th century, several references to Trigarta appear, one of the most important being a 10th-century Chamba inscription that records the Trigarta raja being subdued by Sahilavarman and subsequently becoming his ally. During this period, in 1009 A.D., Mahmud of Ghazni entered the Kangra fort while the Kangra forces were away at war. The ruler at the time was Jagdish Chandra.

The Trigarta capital was moved from Jalandhara to Nagarkot (Kangra) in 1070 A.D., largely because Jalandhar was in frequent contact with various ambitious invading forces passing through the region on their way to central India.

Moreover, Firishta recounts that in the 1st century A.D., Raja Ram Deo of Kanauj overran the hill regions but spared both the Kumaon and Nagarkot rajas after each offered their daughters in marriage.

==== Katoch dynasty ====
The Katoch dynasty of Kangra State claimed to be an offshoot of the Trigartas.

== See also ==
- Kingdoms of Ancient India
- Kangra State

== Sources ==
- Mahabharata of Krishna Dwaipayana Vyasa, translated to English by Kisari Mohan Ganguli
