= Parvata kingdom =

Kingdom mentioned in the Mahabharata

Parvata kingdom refers to the territory of a tribe known as Parvatas (mountaineers), mentioned in the epic Mahabharata. Most of the descriptions of Parvata kingdom in the epic refer to a mountainous country in the Himalayas. Tribes belonging to other mountainous regions in the north west, west and the east of the Indo-Gangetic Plain were also known as Parvatas, when used as a collective name. Parvatas took part in the Kurukshetra War. The epic also mentions a sage named Parvata who was a companion of sage Narada.

== References in Mahabharata ==
=== Conquests of Vasudeva Krishna ===
Parvatas were mentioned in the list of tribes conquered by Krishna:-

The Avantis, the Southerners, the Parvatas, the Daserakas, the Kasmirakas, the Aurasikas, the Pisachas, the Samudgalas, the Kamvojas, the Vatadhanas, the Cholas, the Pandyas, the Trigartas, the Malavas, the Daradas, in danger of being vanquished, the Khasas arriving from diverse realms, as also the Sakas, and the Yavanas with their followers. They were all vanquished by Vasudeva Krishna (7:11)

=== In Kurukshtra War ===
Parvatas took part in the Kurukshetra War siding with Kauravas.

In the back of the Garuda military formation made by Drona were the Kalingas, the Amvashthas, the Magadhas, the Paundras, the Madrakas, the Gandharas, the Sakunas, the Easterners, the Parvatas, and the Vasatis. (7:20)

Arjuna dispatched the Yaudheyas, the Parvatas, the Madrakas, and the Malavas to the regions of the dead (7:158). The Tusharas, the Yavanas, the Khasas, the Darvabhisaras, the Daradas, the Sakas, the Kamathas, the Ramathas, the Tanganas the Andhrakas, the Pulindas, the Kiratas of fierce prowess, the Mlecchas, the Parvatas, and the races hailing from the sea-side, were all united with the Kurus and fighting wrathfully for Duryodhana’s sake (8:73). All the Samsaptakas, the Kambojas together with the Sakas, the Mlecchas, the Parvatas, and the Yavanas, have been slain. (9:1)

=== Tribes mentioned by Karna ===
Parvatas were mentioned in the conversation of Karna and Shalya. This conversation mentions various cultures of ancient India, with a bias towards the Vedic culture which prevailed in Kuru-Panchalas

The Magadhas were comprehenders of signs; the Koshalas comprehended from what they saw; the Kurus and the Pancalas comprehended from a half-uttered speech; the Salwas couldn't comprehend till the whole speech was uttered. The Parvatas, like the Sivis, were very stupid. The Yavanas were omniscient; the Suras were particularly so. The mlecchas were wedded to the creations of their own fancy that other peoples could not understand. The Vahikas resented beneficial counsels. The Madrakas were regarded on Earth as the dirt of every nation. (8:45)

=== Sage named Parvata ===
There was a sage named Parvata who was the companion of sage Narada, mentioned in Mahabharata and the Puranas. Both Parvata and Narada were travellers, during pre-historic ages. They visited Kingdoms of Ancient India as well as other kingdoms beyond the Himalayas in Central Asia, China and West Asia. The name Parvata (meaning mountain in Sanskrit), was given to the traveller, probably because the Vedic people saw them coming to them, after crossing the Himalaya mountains. The wife of Lord Siva, was named Parvati. The name suggests that she belonged to the tribe of Parvatas.

== See also ==
- Kingdoms of Ancient India
- Himalaya Kingdom
- Kirata Kingdom
