= Kirata kingdom =

Mythological kingdom of Sanskrit literature

Kirata kingdom in Sanskrit literature and Hindu mythology refers to any kingdom of the Kiratas, who were dwellers mostly in the Himalayas (mostly eastern Himalaya). They took part in the Kurukshetra War along with Parvatas (mountaineers) and other Himalayan tribes.

== References in Mahabharata ==
The Kambojas, Gandharas, Kiratas and Barbaras were mentioned together as northern tribes at (12,206).

The Yavanas, the Kiratas, the Gandharvas, the Chinas, the Savaras, the Barbaras, the Sakas, the Tusharas, the Kankas, the Pathavas, the Andhras, the Madrakas, the Paundras, the Pulindas, the Ramathas, the Kamvojas were mentioned together as tribes beyond the kingdoms of Aryavarta. The Aryavarta-kings had doubts on dealing with them. (12,64)

=== Kiratas as a Mlechha tribe ===
Kiratas were mentioned along with Pulindas and Chinas, Hunas, Pahlavas, Sakas, Yavanas, Savaras, Paundras, Kanchis, Dravidas, Sinhalas and Keralas. All these tribes were described as Mlechha tribes. Here they were described as the protectors of sage Vasistha and his cow against the attack of the king Viswamitra. (1,177).

=== Territories of Kiratas ===
Kiratas territories extended along the eastern Himalayan belt of the mountain ranges.

==== Kiratas of diverse regions in ancient India ====
Numerous chiefs of the Kiratas, armed with hunting weapons and ever engaged in hunting activities, eating of fruits and roots and attired in skins (animal-skins or tree-barks), were mentioned to dwell on the northern slopes of the Himavat and on the mountain from behind which the sun rises (Arunachal Pradesh) and in the region of Karusha on the sea-coast (could be the mouths of Ganges in Bangladesh or the mouths of Sindhu in Pakistan) and on both sides of the Lohitya mountains (in eastern Assam and western Arunachal Pradesh). They were mentioned as bringing tribute to Yudhishthiraduring his Rajasuya sacrifice. They brought with them, loads upon loads of sandal and aloe as also black aloe, and heaps upon heaps of valuable skins and gold and perfumes, and ten thousand serving-girls of their own race, and many beautiful animals and birds of remote countries, and much gold of great splendour procured from mountains (2,51). The Kairatas (Kiratas), the Daradas, the Darvas, the Suras, the Vaiamakas, the Audumvaras, the Durvibhagas, the Kumaras, the Paradas along with the Vahlikas, the Kashmiras, the Ghorakasalso were mentioned, here as bringin tributes

The various tribes of Kiratas were mentioned. along with the Pahlavas and the Daradas and Yavanas and Sakas and the Harahunas and Chinas and Tukharas and the Sindhavas and the Jagudas and the Ramathas and the Mundas and the inhabitants of the kingdom of women and the Tanganas and the Kekayas and the Malavas and the inhabitants of Kasmira. They were described as accepting the sway of Yudhishthira, performing various offices in his palace..(3,51)

The Kiratas who were fierce in battles mostly dwelled in the vastness of the Himavat. It is believed. by some scholars that they were vanquished by Karna.

==== Kiratas under the Himalayan kingdom called Pulinda ====
Pulinda king is described. as the king of Kiratas also at (2,4). He is said to attend the inauguration of the new court of Pandava king Yudhishthira at Indraprastha along with many other kings of Ancient India (Bharata Varsha). His kingdom lay close to the Kailas range in Tibet.

Domains of king Suvahu, the lord of the Pulinda, is mentioned as situated on the Himalayas abounding in horses and elephants, densely inhabited by the Kiratas and the Tanganas, crowded by hundreds of Pulindas, frequented by the exotic tribes, and rife with wonders. Pandavas stayed here for some time on their onward-journey to the Himalayan regions (3,140).

Then all those warriors, viz the Pandavas having in due course happily lived at Badari (Badrinath, Uttarakhand), for one month, proceeded towards the realm of Suvahu, king of the Kiratas, by following the same track by which they had come. And crossing the difficult Himalayan regions, and the countries of China, Tukhara, Darada and all the climes of Kulinda, rich in heaps of jewels, those warlike men reached the capital of Suvahu (3,176).

Their final destination was the source of Yamuna. Thus they could have made a circular path, from Badari (Badrinath) to Tibet and Kashmir and finally to Himachal Pradesh.

==== Kiratas under Paundraka Vasudeva ====
There was a king named Paundraka Vasudeva, who was an enemy of Vasudeva Krishna. This king used to dress like Vasudeva Krishan and mock him. He mentioned to rule over the kingdoms of Vanga (West Bengal), Pundra(north-Bangladesh) and Kiratas (2,14). The Kiratas mentioned here were those living in the vicinity of Darjeeling Himalayan region.

==== Kiratas under Bhagadatta ====
Kiratas and Chinas were mentioned as forming the army of Pragjyotisha (Assam) king Bhagadatta (5,19). This army took part in the Kurukshetra War for the sake of Kauravas and its size was one Akshouhini (a huge army unit).

==== Kiratas conquered by Bhima ====
Bhima, during his military campaign in the eastern countries to collect tribute for Pandavaking Yudhishthira's Rajasuya sacrifice, conquered Kirata kings, close to the Videha kingdom

Bhima, the son of Pandu, sending forth expeditions from Videha kingdom, conquered the seven kings of the Kiratas living about the Indra mountain (2,29). These were considered to be the Kiratas.

==== Kiratas conquered by Nakula ====
Nakula during his military campaign in the western countries to collect tribute for Pandavaking Yudhishthira's Rajasuya sacrifice, conquered Kiratas in the western hills

Nakula, the son of Pandu, then reduced to subjection the fierce Mlechchas residing on the sea coast (in Karachi area), as also the wild tribes of the Palhavas (an Iranian tribe), the Kiratas, the Yavanas and the Sakas (2,31).

=== Kiratas in Kurukhsetra War ===
Kiratas and Chinas were part of the one Akshouhini of troops of Pragjyotisha (Assam) king Bhagadatta who joined the side of the Kauravas(5,19).

Western Kiratas were mentioned along with the Sakas, and Yavanas, the Sivis and the Vasatis as marching in the huge army of Kauravas (5,198). The Sakas, the Kiratas, the Yavanas, and the Pahlavas were mentioned in a battle-array formed by the Kauravas (6,20). Similarly, they are mentioned in another battle-array formed on another day at (6,50).

Words of Satyaki a Yadava chief on the side of Pandavas, during Kurukshetra War:- Those other elephants 700 in number, all cased in armour and ridden by Kiratas, and decked with ornaments, the king of the Kiratas, desirous of his life, had formerly presented to Arjuna. These were formerly employed in doing good to Yudhishthira. Behold the vicissitudes that time brings about, for these are now battling against Yudhishthira. Those elephants are ridden by Kiratas difficult of defeat in battle. They are accomplished in fighting from elephants and are all sprung from the race of Agni. Formerly, they were all vanquished in battle by Arjuna. They are now waiting for me carefully, under the orders of Duryodhana. Slaying with my shafts these Kiratas difficult of defeat in battle, I shall follow in the track of Arjuna (7,109).

The Tusharas, the Yavanas, the Khasas, the Darvabhisaras, the Daradas, the Sakas, the Kamathas, the Ramathas, the Tanganas the Andhrakas (obviously not the southern Andhras), the Pulindas, the Kiratas of fierce prowess, the Mlecchas, the Mountaineers, and the races hailing from the sea-side, were all united in battle for the purpose of the Kauravaking Duryodhana. (8,73) The ruler of the Kiratas died in battle (8,5).

=== Arjuna's conquests after Kurukhsetra War ===
Countless was the fete of Kshatriyas, of kings in myriads, who fought with Arjuna on the occasion of his military campaign to collect tribute for Yudhishthira's Ashwamedhasacrifice, for having lost their kinsmen on the field of Kurukshetra. Innumerable Kiratas also and Yavanas, all excellent bowmen, and diverse tribes of Mlechechas too, who had been discomfited before (by the Pandavas on the field of Kurukshetra), and many Arya kings, possessed of soldiers and animals, encountered Arjuna in battle (14,73). He battled with the Kasis, the Angas, the Kosalas, the Kiratas, and the Tanganas (14,83)

==== Absence of Brahmins among Kiratas ====
The Mekalas, the Dravidas, the Lathas, the Paundras, the Konwasiras, the Saundikas, the Daradas, the Darvas, the Chauras, the Savaras, the Varvaras, the Kiratas, the Yavanas, Kambojas, Hunas, Sakas and numerous other tribes of Kshatriyas, have gained the status of Sudras through the absence of Brahmanas.

== See also ==
- Kirātārjunīya, poem about Arjuna and Shiva (disguised as a Kirata) in southern India
- Kingdoms of Ancient India
- Kimpurusha kingdom
- Yalambar, legendary king of the modern Kirati people

== Etymology ==
The origin of the word ‘Kirat’ remains debatable and has been the subject of many linguistic interpretations without any single universal definition. The word appears in ancient Hindu literature, including the Mahabharat, where it generally used for identifying mountain peoples inhabiting the Himalayas rather than any specific ethnic group.

According to the Kirat Mundhum, the ancestors of the Kiratas descended from three ancestral groups like the Khambongba who are described as having migrated into the Himalayas at different times.

Kirati Historian Iman Singh Chemjong proposed a different theory that the word Kirata was coined from the names ‘Keretite’ after migrations from western Asia into the Himalayas. Many other scholars have suggested Sanskrit derivations identifying the Kiratas as forest hunters, inhabitants of the mountains, though no single linguistic interpretation has gained acceptance from the Kiratas themselves.
