= Khasas (Mahabharata) =

The Khasas were a northwestern tribe mentioned in the epic Mahabharata.

== References in Mahabharata ==
=== Arrival from diverse realms ===
Khasas were mentioned along with Chivukas and Pulindas and Chinas, Hunas, Pahlavas, Sakas, Yavanas, Savaras, Paundras, Kiratas, Kanchis, Dravidas, Sinhalas and Keralas. All these tribes were described as Mlechha tribes. Here they were described as the protectors of sage Vashistha and his cow against the attack of king Vishwamitra. Khasas were described as a barbarous tribe along with the Chivukas (MBh 1,177)

At (7,11) the Khasas were mentioned as arrived from diverse realms. Khasas were mentioned along with the Malavas, Daradas, Sakas and Yavanas. Here they were mentioned to be vanquished by Vasudeva Krishna.

At (8,8) the Gandharas, the Madrakas, the Matsyas, the Trigartas, the Tanganas, the Khasas, the Pancalas, the Videhas, the Kulindas, the Kasi-kosalas, the Suhmas, the Angas, the Nishadhas, the Pundras, the Kichakas, the Vatsas, the Kalingas, the Taralas, the Asmakas, and the Rishikas were mentioned to be vanquished by Karna.

Pullindas and Khasas were mentioned together at (12,150)

=== Yudhishthira 's Rajasuya yajna ===
The Mahabharata details the various gifts given to Yudhishthira by Indian Kings and neighboring states at the Coronation Ceremonial (Rajasuya yajna). The Khasas, Tanganas, and others brought heaps of gold in dronas (jars) collected by gold-digging ants (which most likely refers to Himalayan marmot ), chamaras (yak's tail), and sweet honey extracted from the flowers growing on the Himavat as tribute. These powerful people were known for their strength and generosity. They were described as people "endued with great strength".

=== Khasas in Kurukshetra War ===
Khasas were mentioned as part of the Kaurava army in the Kurukshetra War, along with other tribes like the Kamvojas and the Sakas. (5-161,162)

Daradas and Tanganas and Khasas and Lampakas and Pulindas were mentioned to be battling in the Kurukshetra War armed with swords and lances. (7,118)

The Pulindas, the Bahlikas, the Nishadas, the Andhakas, the Tanganas, the Southerners, and the Bhojas were mentioned as battling with the Pandya king who was on the side of the Pandavas. (8,20)

The Tusharas, the Yavanas, the Khasas, the Darvabhisaras, the Daradas, the Sakas, the Kamathas, the Ramathas, the Tanganas the Andhrakas, the Pulindas, the Kiratas of fierce prowess, the Mlecchas, the Mountaineers were mentioned as fighting for Duryodhana. (8,73)

== See also ==
- Kingdoms of Ancient India
