= Tushara =

Ancient kingdom located beyond north-west India

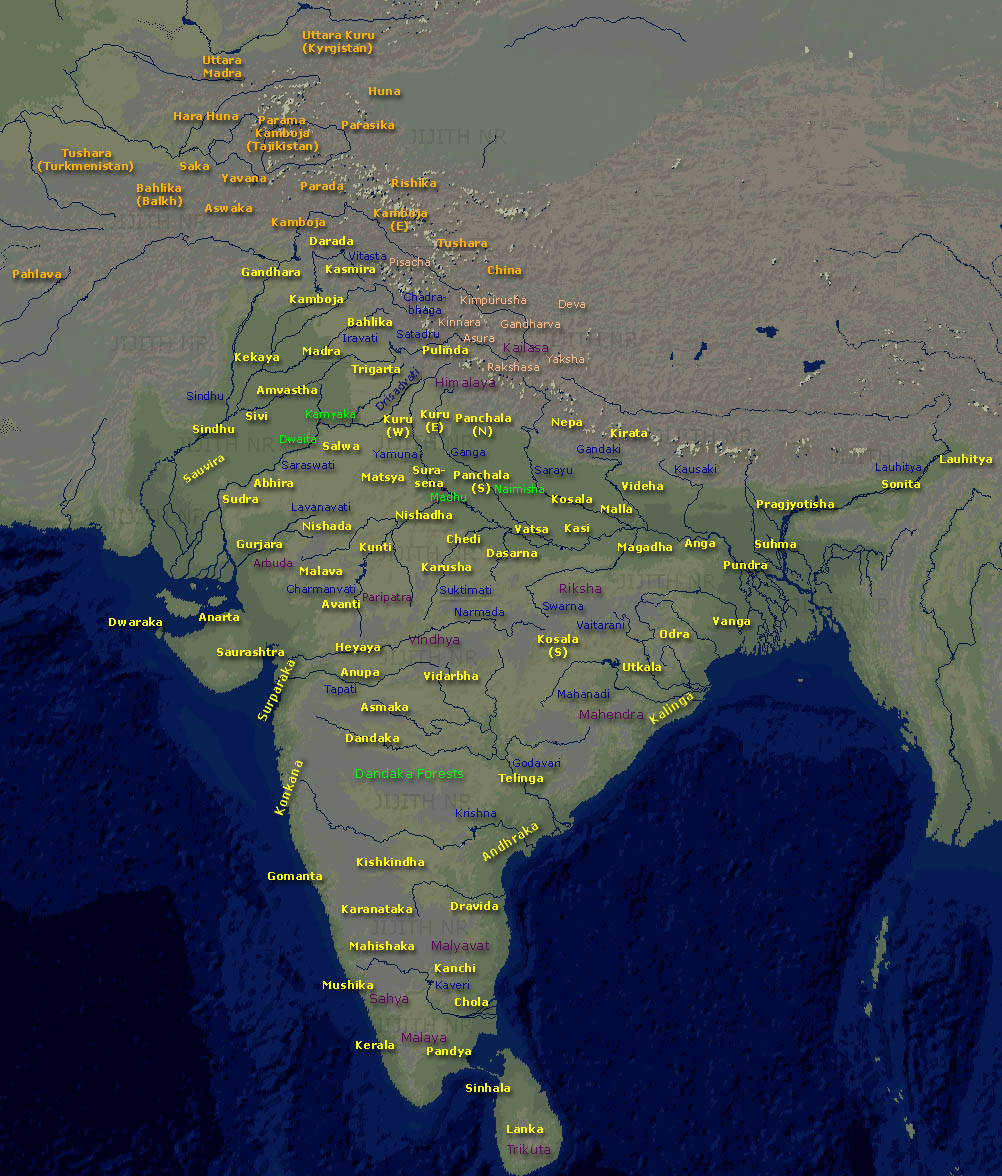
Tushara kingdom (upper left, in orange) alongside other locations of kingdoms and republics mentioned in the Indian epics or Bharata Khanda.

The kingdom of Tushara, according to ancient Indian literature, such as the epic Mahabharata, was a land located beyond north-west India. In the Mahabharata, its inhabitants, known as the Tusharas, are depicted as mlechchas ("barbarians") and fierce warriors.

Modern scholars generally see Tushara as synonymous with the historical "Tukhara", also known as Tokhara or Tokharistan – another name for Bactria. This area was the stronghold of the Kushan Empire, which ruled North India between the 1st and 3rd centuries CE.

== Tukhara ==
The historical Tukhara appears to be synonymous with the land known by Ancient Chinese scholars as Daxia, from the 3rd century BCE onwards.

Its inhabitants were known later to Ancient Greek scholars as the Tokharoi and to the Ancient Romans as Tochari. Modern scholars appear to have conflated the Tukhara with the so-called Tocharians – an Indo-European people who lived in the Tarim Basin, in present-day Xinjiang, China, until the 1st millennium. When the Tocharian languages of the Tarim were rediscovered in the early 20th century, most scholars accepted a hypothesis that they were linked to the Tukhara (who were known to have migrated to Central Asia from China, with the other founding Kushan peoples). However, the subjects of the Tarim kingdoms appear to have referred to themselves by names such as Agni, Kuči and Krorän. These peoples are also known to have spoken centum languages, whereas the Tukhara of Bactria spoke a satem language.

The Tukhara were among Indo-European tribes that conquered Central Asia during the 2nd century BCE, according to both Chinese and Greek sources. Ancient Chinese sources refer to these tribes collectively as the Da Yuezhi ("Greater Yuezhi"). In subsequent centuries the Tukhara and other tribes founded the Kushan Empire, which dominated Central and South Asia.

The account in Mahabharata (Mbh) 1:85 depicts the Tusharas as mlechchas ("barbarians") and descendants of Anu, one of the cursed sons of King Yayati. Yayati's eldest son Yadu, gave rise to the Yadavas and his youngest son Puru to the Pauravas that includes the Kurus and Panchalas. Only the fifth son of Puru's line was considered to be the successors of Yayati's throne, as he cursed the other four sons and denied them kingship. The Pauravas inherited the Yayati's original empire and stayed in the Gangetic plain who later created the Kuru and Panchala kingdoms. They were followers of the Vedic culture. The Yadavas made central and western India their stronghold. The descendants of Anu, known as the Anavas, are said to have migrated to Iran.

Various regional terms and proper names may have originated with, or been derived from, the Tusharas including: Takhar Province in Afghanistan; the Pakistani village of Thakra; the surname Thakkar, found across India; the Marathi surname Thakere, sometimes anglicised as Thackeray; the Takhar Jat clan in Rajasthan, and the Thakar tribe of Maharashtra. It is also possible that the Thakor (or Thakore) caste of Gujarat, the Thakar caste of Maharashtra and the title Thakur originated with names such as Tushara/Tukhara. The Sanskrit word thakkura "lord" may be related to such terms or may itself be derived from one of them.

== Indian literature ==
=== References in Mahabharata ===
The Shanti Parva of the Mahabharata associates the Tusharas with the Yavanas, Kiratas, Chinas, Kambojas, Pahlavas, Kankas, Sabaras, Barbaras, Ramathas etc., and brands them all as barbaric tribes of Uttarapatha, leading lives of Dasyus.

The Tusharas along with numerous other tribes from the north-west, including the Bahlikas, Kiratas, Pahlavas, Paradas, Daradas, Kambojas, Shakas, Kankas, Romakas, Yavanas, Trigartas, Kshudrakas, Malavas, Angas, and Vangas had joined Yudhishtra at his Rajasuya ceremony and brought him numerous gifts such as camels, horses, cows, elephants and gold

Later the Tusharas, Sakas and Yavanas had joined the military division of the Kambojas and participated in the Mahabharata war on the side of the Kauravas. Karna Parva of Mahabharata describes the Tusharas as very ferocious and wrathful warriors.

At one place in the Mahabharata, the Tusharas are mentioned along with the Shakas and the Kankas. At another place they are in a list with the Shakas, Kankas and Pahlavas. And at other places are mentioned along with the Shakas, Yavanas and the Kambojas etc.

The Tushara kingdom is mentioned in the travels of the Pandavas in the northern regions beyond the Himalayas:- Crossing the difficult Himalayan regions, and the countries of China, Tukhara, Darada and all the climes of Kulinda, rich in heaps of jewels, those warlike men reached the capital of Suvahu (3:176).

The Mahabharata makes clear that Vedic Hindus did not know the origins of the Mlechcha tribes, who were highly skilled in weapons, warfare and material sciences, but never followed the Vedic rites properly. That the Vedic people were dealing with foreign tribes is evident in a passage from Mahabharata (12:35). It asks which duties that should be performed by the Yavanas, the Kiratas, the Gandharvas, the Chinas, the Savaras, the Barbaras, the Sakas, the Tusharas, the Kankas, the Pathavas, the Andhras, the Madrakas, the Paundras, the Pulindas, the Ramathas, the Kambojas, and several new castes of Brahmanas, Kshatriyas, Vaishyas, and the Shudras, that had sprung up in the dominions of the Arya kings.

The kings of the Pahlavas and the Daradas and the various tribes of the Kiratas and Yavanas and Sakras and the Harahunas and Chinas and Tukharas and the Sindhavas and the Jagudas and the Ramathas and the Mundas and the inhabitants of the kingdom of women and the Tanganas and the Kekayas and the Malavas and the inhabitants of Kasmira, were present in the Rajasuya sacrifice of Yudhishthira the king of the Pandavas (3:51). The Sakas and Tukhatas and Tukharas and Kankas and Romakas and men with horns bringing with them as tribute numerous large elephants and ten thousand horses, and hundreds and hundreds of millions of golds (2:50).

The Tusharas were very ferocious warriors. The Yavanas and the Sakas, along with the Chulikas, stood in the right wing of the Kaurava battle-array (6:75). The Tusharas, the Yavanas, the Khasas, the Darvabhisaras, the Daradas, the Sakas, the Kamathas, the Ramathas, the Tanganas the Andhrakas, the Pulindas, the Kiratas of fierce prowess, the Mlecchas, the Mountaineers, and the races hailing from the sea-side, all endued with great wrath and great might, delighting in battle and armed with maces, these all—united with the Kurus and fought wrathfully for Duryodhana’s sake (8:73). A number of Saka and Tukhara and Yavana horsemen, accompanied by some of the foremost combatants among the Kambojas, quickly rushed against Arjuna (8:88). F. E Pargiter writes that the Tusharas, along with the Yavanas, Shakas, Khasas and Daradas had collectively joined the Kamboja army of Sudakshina Kamboj and had fought in Kurukshetra war under latter's supreme command.

=== In the Puranas and other Indian texts ===
Puranic texts like Vayu Purana, Brahmanda Purana and Vamana Purana, etc., associate the Tusharas with the Shakas, Barbaras, Kambojas, Daradas, Viprendras, Anglaukas, Yavanas, Pahlavas etc and refer to them all as the tribes of Udichya i.e. north or north-west. The Kambojas, Daradas, Barbaras, Harsavardhanas, Cinas and the Tusharas are described as the populous races of men outside.

Puranic literature further states that the Tusharas and other tribes like the Gandharas, Shakas, Pahlavas, Kambojas, Paradas, Yavanas, Barbaras, Khasa, and Lampakas, etc., would be invaded and annihilated by Lord Kalki at the end of Kali Yuga. And they were annihilated by king Pramiti at the end of Kali Yuga.

According to Vayu Purana and Matsya Purana, river Chakshu (Oxus or Amu Darya) flowed through the countries of Tusharas, Lampakas, Pahlavas, Paradas and the Shakas, etc.

The Brihat-Katha-Manjari of Pt Kshemendra relates that around 400 CE, Gupta king Vikramaditya (Chandragupta II) (r. 375-413/15 CE), had "unburdened the sacred earth by destroying the barbarians" like the Tusharas, Shakas, Mlecchas, Kambojas, Yavanas, Parasikas, Hunas etc.

The Rajatarangini of Kalhana records that king Laliditya Muktapida, the 8th-century ruler of Kashmir had invaded the tribes of the north and after defeating the Kambojas, he immediately faced the Tusharas. The Tusharas did not give a fight but fled to the mountain ranges leaving their horses in the battlefield. This shows that during the 8th century CE, a section of the Tusharas was living as neighbours of the Kambojas near the Oxus valley.

By the 6th century CE, the Brihat Samhita of Varahamihira also locates the Tusharas with Barukachcha (Bhroach) and Barbaricum (on the Indus Delta) near the sea in western India. The Romakas formed a colony of the Romans near the port of Barbaricum in Sindhu Delta. This shows that a section of the Tusharas had also moved to western India and was living there around Vrahamihira's time.

There is also a mention of Tushara-Giri (Tushara mountain) in the Mahabharata, Harshacharita of Bana Bhata and Kavyamimansa of Rajshekhar. ÷

Kingdom

Tushara
- Common languages: Sanskrit, Vedic Languages
- Religion: Hinduism and Vedic folk Religion
- Rajas

== Historical references ==
=== Early Chinese & Greek sources ===
Little is known of the Tukhara before they conquered the Greco-Bactrian Kingdom in the 2nd century BCE. They are known, in subsequent centuries, to have spoken Bactrian, an Eastern Iranian language. The Yuezhi are generally believed to have had their ethnogenesis in Gansu, China. However, Ancient Chinese sources use the term Daxia (Tukhara) for a state in Central Asia, two centuries before the Yuezhi entered the area. Hence the Tukhara may have been recruited by the Yuezhi, from a people neighbouring or subject to the Greco-Bactrians.

Likewise the Atharvaveda also associates the Tusharas with the Bahlikas (Bactrians), Yavanas/Yonas (Greeks) and Sakas (Indo-Scythians), as following: "Saka.Yavana.Tushara.Bahlikashcha". It also places the Bahlikas as neighbors of the Kambojas. This may suggest that the Tusharas were neighbours to these peoples, possibly in Transoxiana.

=== Later Chinese sources ===
In the 7th century CE, the Chinese pilgrim Xuanzang, by way of the "Iron Pass" entered Tukhara (覩貨羅 Pinyin Duhuoluo; W-G Tu-huo-luo). Xuanzang stated that it lay south of the Iron Pass, north of the "great snow mountains" (Hindukush), and east of Persia, with the Oxus "flowing westward through the middle of it."

During the time of Xuanzang, Tukhāra was divided into 27 administrative units, each having its separate chieftain.

=== Tibetan chronicles ===
The Tukharas (Tho-gar) are mentioned in the Tibetan chronicle Dpag-bsam-ljon-bzah (The Excellent Kalpa-Vrksa), along with people like the Yavanas, Kambojas, Daradas, Hunas, Khasas etc.

=== References in association with the Kambojas ===
The Komedai of Ptolemy, the Kiumito or Kumituo of Xuanzang's accounts, Kiumizhi of Wu'kong, Kumi of the Tang Annals, Kumed or Kumadh of some Muslim writers, Cambothi, Kambuson and Komedon of the Greek writers (or the Kumijis of Al-Maqidisi, Al-Baihaki, Nasir Khusau etc.) who lived in Buttamen Mountains (now in Tajikistan) in the upper Oxus are believed by many scholars to be the Kambojas who were living neighbors to the Tukhara/Tusharas north of the Hindukush in the Oxus valley. The region was also known as Kumudadvipa of the Puranic texts, which the scholars identify with Sanskrit Kamboja.

Before its occupation by the Tukhara, Badakshan formed a part of ancient Kamboja (Parama Kamboja) but, after its occupation by the Tukhara in the 2nd century BCE, Badakshan and some other territories of the Kamboja became part of Tukhara.

Around the 4th to 5th century CE, when the fortunes of the Tukhara finally waned, the original population of Kambojas re-asserted itself, and the region again started to be called by its ancient name, i.e., "Kamboja", though northwestern parts still retained the name of Duhuoluo or Tukharistan in Chinese at least until the time of the Tang dynasty.

There are several later references to Kamboja of the Pamirs/Badakshan. Raghuvamsha - a 5th-century Sanskrit play by Kalidasa, attests their presence on river Vamkshu (Oxus) as neighbors to the Hunas (Raghu: 4.68-70). As seen above, the 7th-century Chinese pilgrim Xuanzang mentions the Kiumito/Kumito living to the north of the Oxus, which may refer to Komedai of Ptolemy. which, as noted above, has been equated to Kamboja mentioned in Sanskrit texts.

The 8th-century king of Kashmir, King Lalitadiya, invaded the Kambojas of the "far-spreading northern region" (uttarāpatha) as mentioned in the Rajatarangini of Kalhana. After encountering the Kambojas, Lalitadiya's army approached the Tuhkhāras who "fled to the mountain ranges leaving behind their horses." According to D. C. Sircar, the Kambojas here are bracketed with the Tukharas and are shown as living in the eastern parts of the Oxus valley as neighbors of the Tukharas who were living in the western parts of that Valley.

The 10th century CE Kavyamimamsa of Rajshekhar lists the Tusharas with several other tribes of the Uttarapatha viz: the Shakas, Kekeyas, Vokkanas, Hunas, Kambojas, Bahlikas, Pahlavas, Limpakas, Kulutas, Tanganas, Turusakas, Barbaras, Ramathas etc. This mediaeval era evidence shows that the Tusharas were different from the Turushakas with whom they are often confused by some writers.

=== Possible connection to the Rishikas ===
Pompeius Trogus remarks that the Asii were lords of the Tochari. It is generally believed that they are same as the Rishikas of the Mahabharata which people are equivalent to Asii (in Prakrit). V. S. Aggarwala also equates the Rishikas with the Asii or Asioi. In 1870, George Rawlinson commented that "The Asii or Asiani were closely connected with the Tochari and the Sakarauli (Saracucse?) who are found connected with both the Tochari and the Asiani".

If the Rishikas of the Mahabharata were same as the Tukharas, then the observation from George Rawlinson is in line with the Mahabharata statement which also closely allies the Rishikas with the Parama Kambojas and places them both in the Sakadvipa. The Kambojas (i.e. the southern branch of the Parama Kambojas), are the same as the classical Assaceni/Assacani (Aspasio/Assakenoi of Arrian) and the Aśvayana and Aśvakayana of Panini. They are also mentioned by Megasthenes who refers to them as Osii (= Asii), Asoi, Aseni etc., all living on upper Indus in eastern Afghanistan. The names indicate their connection with horses and horse culture. These Osii, Asoi/Aseni clans represent earlier migration from the Parama Kamboja (furthest Kamboja) land, lying between Oxus and Jaxartes, which happened prior to Achaemenid rule. Per epic evidence, Parama Kamboja was the land of the Loha-Kamboja-Rishikas.

The Rishikas are said by some scholars to be the same people as the Yuezhi. The Kushanas are also said by some to be the same people. Kalhana (c. 1148-1149 CE) claims that the three kings he calls Huṣka, Juṣka and Kaniṣka (commonly interpreted to refer to Huvishka, Vāsishka and Kanishka I) were "descended from the Turuṣka race". Aurel Stein says that the Tukharas (Tokharoi/Tokarai) were a branch of the Yuezhi. P. C. Bagchi holds that the Yuezhi, Tocharioi and Tushara were identical. If he is correct, the Rishikas, Tusharas/Tukharas (Tokharoi/Tokaroi), the Kushanas and the Yuezhi, were probably either a single people, or members of a confederacy.

Sabha Parva of Mahabharata states that the Parama Kambojas, Lohas and the Rishikas were allied tribes. Like the "Parama Kambojas", the Rishikas of the Transoxian region are similarly styled as "Parama Rishikas". Based on the syntactical construction of the Mahabharata verse 5.5.15 and verse 2.27.25, Ishwa Mishra believe that the Rishikas were a section of the Kambojas i.e. Parama Kambojas. V. S. Aggarwala too, relates the Parama Kambojas of the Trans-Pamirs to the Rishikas of the Mahabharata and also places them in the Sakadvipa (or Scythia). According to Dr B. N. Puri and some other scholars, the Kambojas were a branch of the Tukharas. Based on the above Rishika-Kamboja connections, some scholars also claim that the Kambojas were a branch of the Yuezhi themselves. Dr Moti Chander also sees a close ethnic relationship between the Kambojas and the Yuezhi .

Modern scholars are still debating the details of these connections without coming to any firm consensus.

=== Japan Visit ===
According to the Nihon Shoki, the second-oldest book of classical Japanese history, in 1654 two men and two women of the Tushara Kingdom, along with one woman from Shravasti, were drive by a storm to take refuge at the former Hyūga Province in southern Kyushu. They remained for several years before setting off for home. That is the first recorded visit of people from India to Japan.

== See also ==
- Tokharistan
- Bactria
- Tocharians
- Kambojas
- Bahlikas
- Janapadas
- Kingdoms of Ancient India
- Mahabharata of Krishna Dwaipayana Vyasa, translated to English by Kisari Mohan Ganguli
- Takhar Province
