= Chinas =

People mentioned in ancient Indian religious texts

The Chinas (Sanskrit चीनः Cīna) are a people mentioned in the Indian religious texts, such as the Mahabharata, Manusmriti, and the Puran.

== Etymology ==
The origin of the Sanskrit name Cīna is commonly believed to have been the Qin (Tsin or Chin in older transliterations) dynasty which ruled in China from 221 BC, or the preceding state of Qin which is traditionally dated to the 9th century BC.

There are a number of other suggestions for the origin of the word. Some Chinese and Indian scholars argued for the state of Jing (荆) as the likely origin of the name, while other theories suggest it is derived from Zina, the endonym of the inhabitants of Yelang.

== Hindu religious texts ==
=== Mahabharata ===
The Sanskrit epic work Mahabharata contains certain references to China, referring to its people as the China tribe.

In the Mahabharata, the Chinas appear together with the Kiratas among the armies of King Bhagadatta of Pragjyotisa (Assam). In the Sabhaparvan, the same king is said to be surrounded by the Kiratas, and the Cinas. Also in the Bhismaparvan, the army of Bhagadatta is said to consist of the Kirtas and the "yellow-coloured" Cinas. Bhishamaparva of Mahabharata also lists the Chinas with the mlechha tribes of the north like the Yavanas, Kambojas, Kuntalas, Hunas, Parasikas, Darunas, Ramanas, Dasamalikas. Shantiparvan of Mahabharata groups the Chinas with the tribes of the Uttarapatha, viz. the Yavanas, Kiratas, Gandharas, Shabras, Barbaras, Shakas, Tusharas, Kanakas, Pahlavas, Sindhus, Madrakas, Ramathas, and the Kambojas and states them to be living the lives of Dasyus. These verses of the epic expect these tribes to perform certain duties which are different from those performed by the Brahmanas, Kshatriyas, Vaishyas, and Shudras. Vanaparvan of the Mahabharata states that the territory of the Chinas can be reached by a land-route across the country of the Kiratas in the mountain regions of the north.

China is mentioned as one among the northern kingdoms in Mahabharata, Book 6, chapter 9: –Among the tribes of the north are the Mlecchas, and the Kruras, the Yavanas, the Chinas, the Kambojas, the Darunas, and many Mleccha tribes; the Sukritvahas, the Kulatthas, the Hunas, the Parasikas, the Ramanas, and the Dasamalikas.

Chinas were mentioned along with Chivukas and Pulindas and Khasas, Hunas, Pahlavas, Sakas, Yanavas, Savaras, Paundras, Kiratas, Kanchis, Dravidas, Sinhalas and Keralas. Here they were described as the protectors of sage Vasistha and his cow against the attack of king Viswamitra. (1,177)

Pahlavas and the Daradas, the various tribes of the Kiratas, Yanavas, Sakas, Harahunas, Chinas, Tusharas, Sindhavas, Jagudas, Ramathas and the Mundas, as well as the inhabitants of the kingdom of women, Tanganas, Kekayas, Malavas and the inhabitants of Kasmira were mentioned at (3,51) as bringing tribute to the Pandava king Yudhishthira.

The Yanavas, the Kiratas, the Gandharvas, the Chinas, the Savaras, the Barbaras, the Sakas, the Tusharas, the Kankas, the Pathavas, the Andhras, the Madrakas, the Paundras, the Pulindas, the Ramathas, the Kambojas were mentioned together as tribes beyond the kingdoms of Aryavarta. The Aryavarta kings had doubts about dealing with them. (12,64)

China is mentioned in the travel-descriptions of the Pandavas. The passage below, describes these Chinas, to be located somewhere in the high Himalayas: Mahabharata book 3, chapter 176 (MBh 3.176): "Leaving the place called Badari (Badrinath in Uttarakhand) and crossing the difficult Himalayan regions, and leaving behind them, the countries of China, Tukhara, Darada and all the climes of Kulinda, rich in heaps of jewels, those warlike men, viz. the Pandavas, reached the capital of Suvahu, the king of Pulindas (Kiratas)."

Bhima mentions a "China king" Dhautamulaka, who caused the destruction of his own race (5,74). The name "Dhautamulaka" translates to "clean root", and might be a reference to the last Xia emperor Jie (1728–1675 BC).

"Deer skins from China" are mentioned at (5,86). King Dhritarashtra wanted to give a thousand deer-skins from China as a present to Vasudeva Krishna:I will give him a thousand deer-skins brought from China and other things of the kind that may be worthy of his praise. During the Han dynasty (between the 2nd century BC and 2nd century AD), deer skins were used to make token money notes representing 400,000 coins.

=== Ramayana ===
Kiskindhakanda of Valmiki's Ramayana makes reference to Cinas as well as Parama-Cinas and associates them with the trans-Himalayan tribes of the Daradas, Kambojas, the Yavanas, the Sakas, the Kiratas, the Bahlikas, the Rishikas, and the Tañkanas of the Uttarapatha. They sent tributaries to Ayodhya and were protector of Dharma in northern Asia from Siberia to modern China.

The epic literature asserts that the Cinas, Khasas, Hunas, Shakas, Kambojas, Yavanas, Pahlavas, Kiratas, Sinhalas, Mlechchas etc. were created by sage Vashistha through the divine powers of cow Sabala or Nandini (Kamdhenu).

=== Puranas ===
In the Kalika Purana, the Cinas are again grouped with the Kambojas, Shakas, Khasas and the Barabaras etc. and are said to have sided with Buddhist king Kali in the war against Vedic king Kalika.

Bhuvanakosha section of numerous Puranas locates the Cinas along with the Tusharas, Pahlavas, Kambojas, and Barbaras in the Udichya or northern division of ancient India. There is yet another reference to China as Cina-maru as referred to in the Vayu Purana and Brahmanda Purana. However, at the same place, Matsya Purana mentions Vira-maru. China-maru or Vira-maru has been identified with the lands of Turkestan situated above And-khui in the north of Afghanistan (Dr K. P. Jayswal, Dr M. R. Singh).

== Buddhist religious texts ==
The Cinas also find reference in the Buddhist play, Mudrarakshasa, where they are listed with other contemporary tribes, such as the Shakas, Yavanas, Kiratas, Cambojas, Bhalikas, Parasikas, Khasas, Gandharas, Kalutas, etc.

Buddhist text Milindapanho (see: Sacred Books of the East, xxxvi, 204), associates the Chinas with the Sakas, Yavanas, Kambojas and Vilatas(?) etc., and locates them in and beyond the western Tibet/Ladakh, according to Dr Michael Witzel.

== Other texts ==
The Arthashastra, believed to date between the 2nd century BCE and 3rd century CE, refers to Chinese silk as "cinamsuka" (Chinese silk dress) and "cinapatta" (Chinese silk bundle).

The Sanmoha Tantra speaks of the Tantric culture of the foreign countries like the Bahlika (Bactria), Kirata, Bhota (Tibet), Cina, Maha-Cina, Parasika, Airaka, Kambojas, Huna, Yavana, Gandhara and Nepala.

The Laws of Manu, dated between 200 BC and 300 AD, describes the downfall of the Chinas, as well as many foreign groups in India:

"43. But in consequence of the omission of the sacred rites, and of their not consulting Brahmanas, the following tribes of Kshatriyas have gradually sunk in this world to the condition of Shudras;
44. (Viz.) the Paundrakas, the Chodas, the Dravidas, the Kambojas, the Yavanas, the Shakas, the Paradas, the Pahlavas, the Chinas, the Kiratas, the Daradas and the Khashas."

Besides China and Parama-China, there is also a reference to Mahachina in the Manasollasa which text mentions the fabrics from Mahachina. It is thus possible that China probably referred to western Tibet or Ladakh, Mahachina to Tibet proper, and Parama-China to mainland China.

== China ==
This word was transcribed into various forms including {支那 (Zhīnà), 芝那 (Zhīnà), 脂那 (Zhīnà) and 至那 (Zhìnà).

== See also ==
- Chin people
- Sino-Indian relations
- Chinese in India
- Indians in China
- Hinduism in China
- Ahom people
