= Pahlava kingdom =

Historic Iranian kingdom

The Pahlava kingdom (Sanskrit: पल्लव राजवंश) is identified to be a kingdom of an Iranian tribe. The kingdom was well known, even during the campaign of Alexander. It was also mentioned in the epic Mahabharata.

== References in Mahabharata ==
=== Yudhishthira's Rajasuya ===
Pahlava king is listed as present in the conclave of kings present in Pandava king Yudhishthira's Rajasuya sacrifice.

The Vangas and Angas and Paundras and Odras and Cholas and Dravidas and Andhakas, and the chiefs of many islands and countries on the seaboard as also of frontier states, including the rulers of the Sinhalas, the barbarous mlecchas, the natives of Lanka, and all the kings of the West by hundreds, and all the chiefs of the sea-coast, and the kings of the Pahlavas and the Daradas and the various tribes of the Kiratas and Yavanas and Sakras and the Harahunas and Chinas and Tukharas and the Sindhavas and the Jagudas and the Ramathas and the Mundas and the inhabitants of the kingdom of women and the Tanganas and the Kekayas and the Malavas and the inhabitants of Kasmira performed various offices at the palace of Yudhishthira during the Rajasuya sacrifice. (3:51).

=== Drupada's list ===
Drupada (the father-in-law of the Pandavas) lists the powerful kings of the time, who could be summoned to the cause of the Pandavas, in their battle (Kurukshetra War) against the Kauravas:-

Quickly send word to Shalya (of Madra), and to the kings under him, and to king Bhagadatta of immeasurable valour residing on the eastern sea-coast (Pragjyotisha), and to fierce Hardikya, and Ahuka, and the king of the Mallas of powerful understanding, and Rochamana. Let Vrihanta be summoned and king Senavindu, and Vahlika and Mudjakesa and the ruler of the Chedis, and Suparsva, Suvahu; and that great hero, Paurava; and also the kings of the Sakas, the Pahlavas, and the Daradas, and Surari, and Nadija, and king Karnavest, and Nila, and the valiant king Viradharman; and Durjaya, and Dantavakra, and Rukmi, and Janamejaya; and Ashada and Vayuvega, and king Purvapali; and Bhuritejas, and Devaka, and Ekalaya with his sons; and also the kings of the Karusha race, and the valiant Kshemamurti, and the kings of the Kamboja and the Richika tribes, and of the western sea-coast; and Jayatsena and the king of Kashi, and the rulers of the land of the five rivers, and the proud son of Kratha, and the rulers of the mountain regions, and Janaki, and Susarman and Maniman, and Potimatsyaka, and the valiant Dhrishtaketu, and the ruler of the kingdom of Pansu; and Paundra, and Dandadhara, and the brave Vrihatsena; and Aparajita, and Nishada and Srenimat and Vasumat; and Vrihadvala of great strength, and Vahu the conqueror of hostile cities; and the warlike king Samudrasena with his son; and Uddhava, and Kshemaka and king Vatadhana; and Srutayus, and Dridhayus, and the gallant son of Salwa; and the king of the Kalingas, and Kumara, unconquerable in battle. Speedily send word to these (5:4).

=== In Kurukshetra War ===
Pahlavas sided with the Kauravas in the Kurukshetra War

Saradwat’s son Kripa, that fighter in the van, that high-souled and mighty bowman, called also Gautama, conversant with all modes of warfare, accompanied by the Sakas, the Kiratas, the Yavanas, and the Pahlavas, took up his position at the northern point of the army (6:20).

== See also ==
- Kingdoms of Ancient India
