= Kasmira kingdom =

Kingdom referenced in the Mahabharata

Kasmira or Kashmira was a kingdom mentioned in the Hindu epic Mahabharata, identified as the Kashmir Valley along the Jhelum River of present-day Jammu and Kashmir, India. During the epic ages this was one among the territories of the Naga race. The Kasmiras were allies of the Kuru king Duryodhana.

== References in Mahabharata ==
=== Kasmira along with neighbouring kingdoms ===
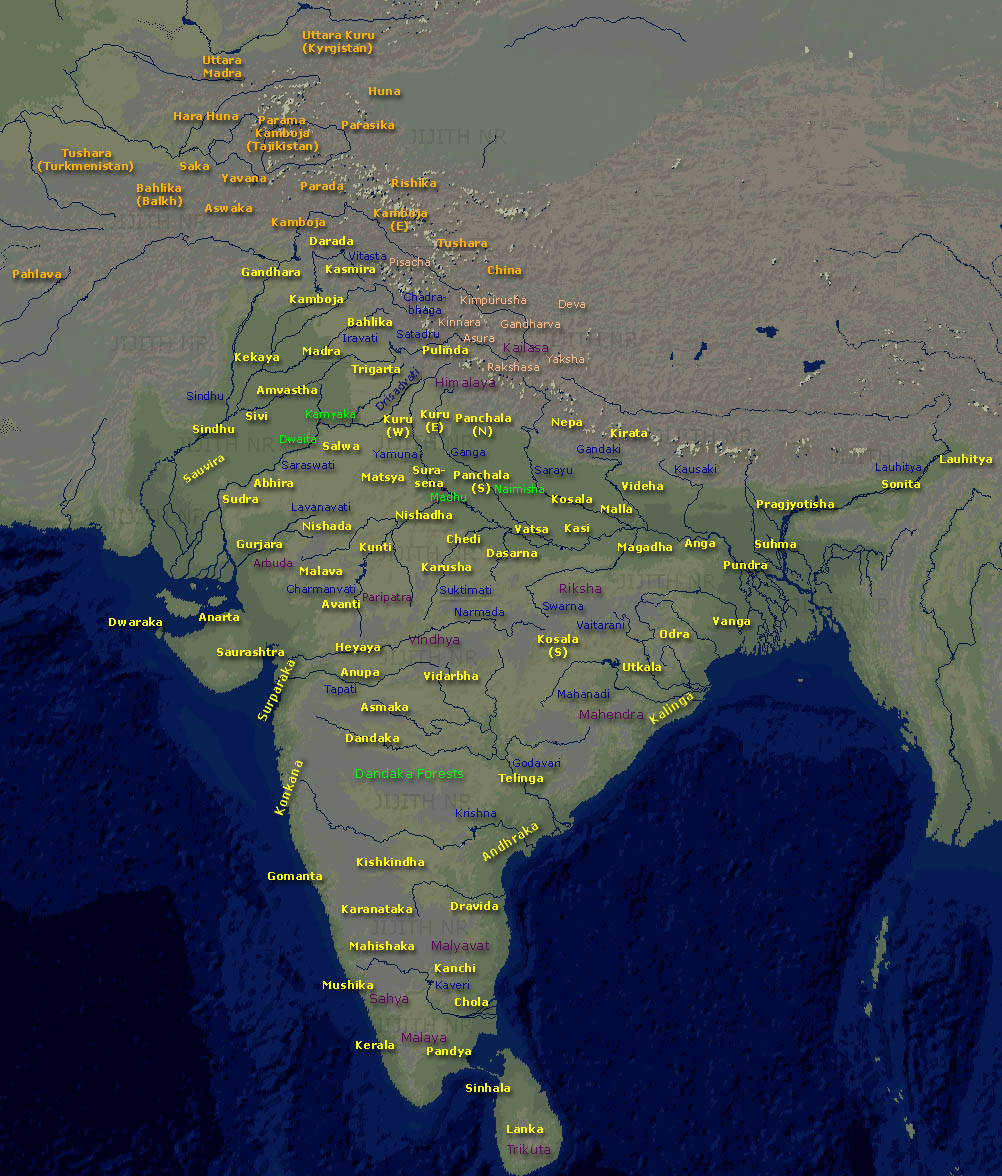
Location of Kasmira in the Epic Map of India

Kasmira is mentioned as a kingdom of ancient India (Bharata Varsha) along with the Sindhu, the Sauviras, the Gandharvas, the Darsakas, the Abhisaras, the Utulas, the Saivalas, the Valhikas, and the Darvis. Then again there are the Sudras, the Abhiras, the Dardas, the Kasmiras, and the Pattis.

Kasmiras were mentioned along with the Pahlavas, the Daradas, and the various tribes of the Kiratas, Yavanas, Sakas, Harahunas, Chinas, Tukharas, Sindhavas, Jagudas, Ramathas, Mundas, the inhabitants of the kingdom of women, Tanganas, Kekayas, and the Malavas as bringing tribute to Yudhishthira's Rajasuya sacrifice.

The Daserakas, the Kasmirakas, the Aurasikas, the Pisachas, the Samudgalas, the Kamvojas, and the Vatadhanas were mentioned together and said to be vanquished by Vasudeva Krishna.

The Kashmiras and the Daradas, along with other tribes, were vanquished by Bhargava Rama.

=== The rivers of Kasmira ===
The river Vitasta, is situated in the country of the Kasmiras and is the abode of the Naga Takshaka. The rivers Chandrabhaga and the Vitasta have pure waters. The very many rivers flowing through Kasmira fall into the great river called Sindhu.

=== Arjuna at Kasmira ===
Arjuna during his military campaign to collect tribute to Yudhishthira's Rajasuya sacrifice, arrived at Kashmira. Arjuna brought under his sway the seven tribes called Utsava-sanketa. Then he defeated the Kshatriyas of Kashmira and also King Lohita along with ten minor chiefs. Then the Trigartas, the Daravas, the Kokonadas, and various other Kshatriyas advanced against the son of Pandu.

=== Yudhishthira's Rajasuya sacrifice ===
Kasmira king attended Yudhishthira's Rajasuya sacrifice.

The Kairatas, the Daradas, the Darvas, the Suras, the Vaiamakas, the Audumvaras, the Durvibhagas, the Kumaras, the Paradas along with the Vahlikas, the Kashmiras, the Ghorakas, the Hansakayanas, the Sivis, the Trigartas, the Yauddheyas, the ruler of Madras and the Kaikeyas, the Amvashtas, the Kaukuras, the Tarkshyas, the Vastrapas along with the Palhavas, the Vashatayas, the Mauleyas along with the Kshudrakas, and the Malavas, the Paundrayas, the Kukkuras, the Sakas and many others brought tribute to Pandava King Yudhishthira's Rajasuya sacrifice.

=== Pilgrimages ===
The region around Haramukuta, with the lakes Kalodaka (also called Nandikunda) and Uttaramanasa, and an image of Nandishwara, are listed as sites of pilgrimage or tirtha.

=== Other references ===
- Kasmira king was mentioned as one among the great kings along with Alarka, Aila, Karandhama, Daksha, etc.
- Kashmerean mare is mentioned in book 4, chapter 9.

=== Kurukshetra war ===
Kasmira did not participate in the Kurukshetra war. This absence is expounded upon in Nilamata Purana, a later puranic Hindu text from Kashmir. According to it, Krishna slew Damodara I, the king of Kasmira, and installed his infant son on the throne with queen Yashovati as regent. Thus, with an infant king, the Kasmira kingdom could not participate in the war.

== See also ==
- Kingdoms of Ancient India
- Paisachi
