= Parama China kingdom =

Former kingdom north east of the Himalayas

Parama Chinas (Sanskrit: परम चीन) were a kingdom to the north east of the Himalayas. The Parama Chinas were mentioned in Mahabharata along with another kingdom named China.

== See also ==
- Kingdoms of Ancient India
