= Dravida kingdom =

Place in Sanskrit epic

Dravida is mentioned as one of the kingdoms in the southern part of present-day mainland India during the time of the Mahabharata.

== Dravida in the Mahabharata ==
Dravida is listed among the ancient Indian (Bharata Varsha) kingdoms:

"In the south, are the Dravidas, the Keralas, the Mushikas, and the Vanavashikas; the Karanatakas, the Mahishakas, the Vikalpas, and also the Mushakas; the Jhillikas, the Kuntalas. (6,9)"

=== Origin ===
The Mahabharata links the origin of Dravidas with sage Vasishtha. Vishvamitra, a king in the Chandravamshi Amavasu clan, attacked the cow of Vasishtha. Then many armies emerged for the protection of that cow and they attacked the armies of Vishvamitra.

Other kingdoms that were mentioned along with the Dravidas in this incident were Sakas, Yavanas, Savaras, Kanchis, Paundras and Kiratas, Nishada, and Sinhalas, and the barbarous kingdoms of Khasas, Chivukas, Pulindas, Chinas Hunas with Keralas, and Mleecchas.

=== Sahadeva's conquests ===
Pandava Sahadeva reached the Dravida country during his southern military campaign.

Sahadeva brought under his subjection and exacted tributes from the Paundrayas, the Dravidas along with the Udrakeralas and the Andhras and the Talavanas. He also vanquished the Karnatas, Pashandas, the town of Sanjayanti, the Kalinga, the Ustrakarnikas, the city of Atavi and the city of Yavanas. (2,30)

=== Yudhishthira's Rajasuya ===
Dravidas are mentioned along with other kings who attended Pandava king Yudhishthira's Rajasuya sacrifice.

The kings of the Dravidas and the Sinhalas were present in the sacrifice (2,33). On another occasion, the Cheras, Cholas and Dravidas (3,51).

=== Pandavas visited Dravida land during their pilgrimage ===
Pandavas reached the sea in the Dravida land, and visited the holy spot passing under Agastya’s name, which was exceedingly sacred and exceptionally pure. And the valiant king visited the feminine sacred spots. They visited one by one those holy places on the coast of the sea and many other sacred spots and came to the holiest of all known by the name of Surparaka. (3,118)

=== Arjuna's conquests ===
Arjuna in his military campaign after the Kurukshetra War, visited the Dravida country

Arjuna proceeded towards the southern ocean. In those regions battle took place between him and the Dravidas and Andhras and the fierce Mahishakas and the hillmen of Kolwa. (14,83)

=== Dravidas in Kurukshetra war ===
==== On the side of Pandavas ====
- Arjuna converted the people of the Dravida land to be a portion of his own army (5,22)
- The Kuntalas, the Andhras, and the Talacharas, and the Shuchupas, and the Venupas were described as allies of Pandavas (5,140)
- The Pandyas, the Cholas, the Keralas and the Andhras supported Dhristadyumna, Sikhandi and Satyaki. (8,12)
- The Andhaka, and the Nishada foot-soldiers, urged on by Satyaki, once more rushed towards Karna in that battle (8,49)

==== On the side of Kauravas ====
- The Kamvojas, the Sakas, the Khasas, the Salwas, the Mlechchhas, the Pulindas, the Dravidas, the Andhras, and the Kanchis were described as allied to the Kauravas (5-161,162)
- The Kaikeyas, the Malavas, the Madrakas the Dravidas of fierce prowess, the Yaudheyas, the Lalittyas, the chander, the Usinaras, the Tundikeras, the Savitriputras who supported Karna were slain by Arjuna (8,5)

== Dravida kingdom in the Pallava era ==
Dravida was conquered twice during the Pallava dynasty, first by Dhruvaniti around 400 CE, and again by Kongani-varma III in the late 6th and early 7th Century.

== Jana Gana Mana ==
In Jana Gana Mana, the national anthem of India, the line about Dravid is found as follows:

Dravida Utkala Banga (द्राविड़ उत्कल बंग)

== See also ==
- Kingdoms of Ancient India
