= Bahlikas =

Ancient people and region in Sanskrit literature

In the classical Sanskrit literature, the Bahlikas or Balhikas (also named Vahlikas or Valhikas) were an ancient people inhabiting a northwestern region of South Asia, which had same name. They are mentioned in the Atharvaveda, Mahabharata, Ramayana, Puranas, Bṛhat Saṃhitā, Amarakosha, and several other works.

South Asia c. 500 BCE

== Geography ==
=== Vedic literature ===
In Atharvaveda 5.22 (dated first millennium BCE), mentions of Balhikas along with other northwestern peoples occur in form of charm against fever;

gaccha takman mūjavantaṃ vā balhikān vā parastaram
"Go, O fever, to the Mūjavants, or farther away to the Balhikas."

— AV 5.22.7

=== In Sanskrit epics ===
The Karṇa Parvan, 8.30.35–47 section of Mahabharata (dated no later than 4th century CE) names country of the Balhikas as Aratta, and places it where six rivers of Sutlej, Chenab, Ravi, Beas, Jhelum and Indus flowed, as;

pañca nadyo vahanty etā yatra pīlūvanānyapi

śatadruśca vipāśā ca tṛtīyerāvatī tathā

candrabhāgā vitastā ca sindhuṣaṣṭhā bahirgatāḥ

āraṭṭa nāma te deśā...

pañca nadyo vahantyeta yatra niḥsṛtya parvatāt

āraṭṭa nāma balhikā na teṣvaryo dvyaham vaset

"Where these five rivers, viz. Śatadru, Vipāśā, the third Irāvatī, Candrabhāgā and Vitastā flow and where there are pīlū-forests and (where) Sindhu is the sixth to flow out, this country is called Āraṭṭa... That (region) where these five rivers, emerging from the mountains flow, this Āraṭṭa (country) is called Bālhika where the Arya should not stay even for two days."

— 8.30.35–36, 47

Salya, the king of Madra mentioned in the Mahabharata, has been called a Bahlika Pungava (i.e., foremost among the Bahlikas). Princess Madri from the Madra is also referred to as Bahliki (i.e. a princess of the Bahlika clan). In the digvijay expedition of Pandava Arjuna, there is a reference to a group called the Bahlikas, whom Arjuna had to fight. They are stated to have been located on the southern side of Kashmir as neighbors to the Ursa and Sinhapura kingdoms.

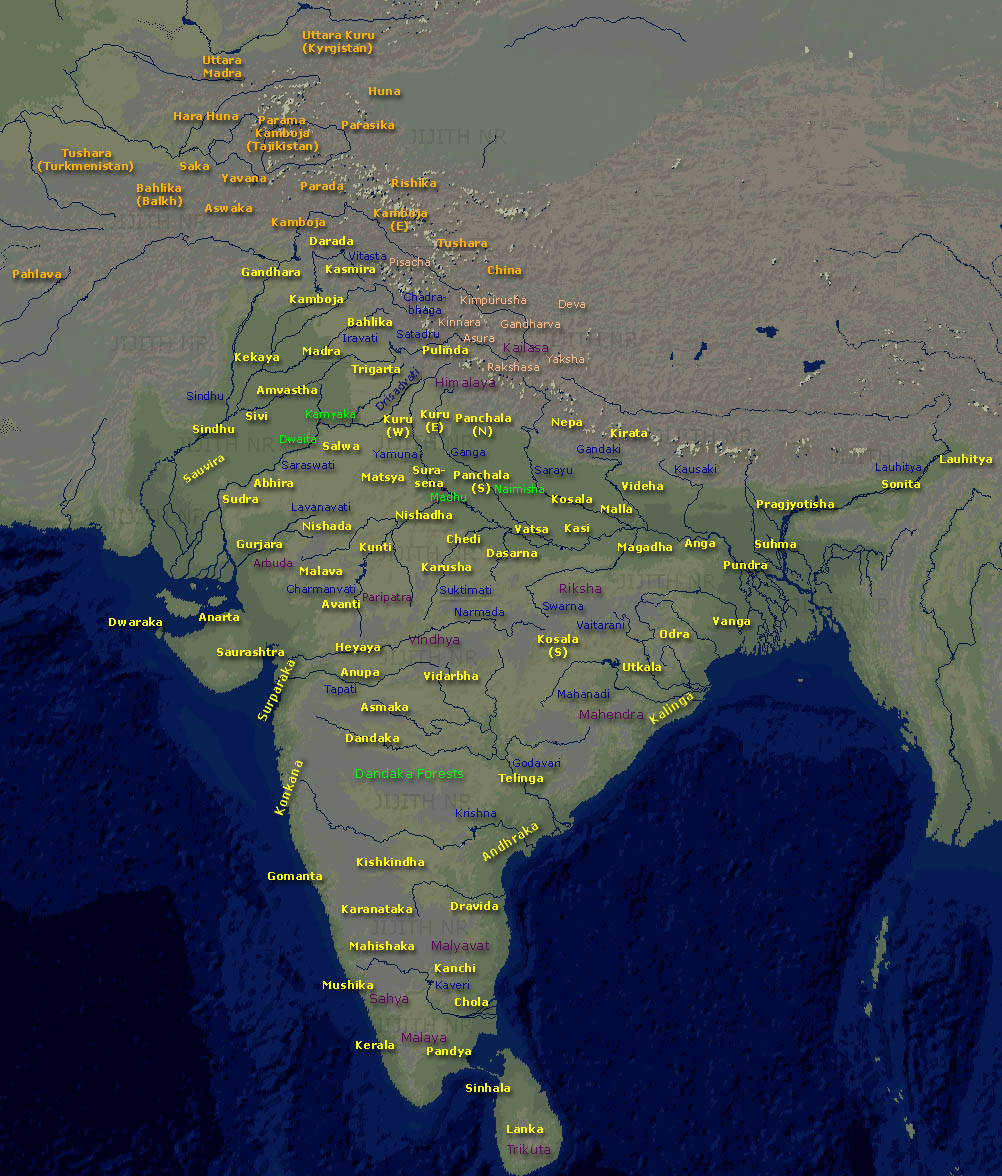
Bahlikas alongside other locations of kingdoms and republics mentioned in the Indian epics.

A passage in the Ramayana attests that on the way from Ayodhya to Kekaya, one had to pass through the country of Bahlikas, located somewhere in Punjab. This suggests that ancient Bahlikas had a settlement in Punjab.

Atharvaveda-Parisista juxtaposes the Vedic Bahlikas with the Kambojas (i.e., Kamboja-Bahlika). Besides Kambojas, the Atharvaveda-Parisista also associates the Vedic Bahlikas with the Sakas, Yavanas, and Tusharas (Saka-Yavana-Tukhara-Vahlikaishcha).

=== In Puranic literature ===
According to the Bhuvanakosha section of the Puranas, Bahlika was a Janapada located in the Udichya (Uttarapatha) division. The Brahmanda Purana attests that the river Chaksu flowed through the land of Bahlavas (Bahlikas). A similar expression is found in the Padma Purana: (Surashtransa.bahlika.ssudrabhirastathaivacha). According to the Puranas, a branch of these people ruled in the Vindhyas. The Puranas attest that a branch of the Bahlikas ruled near the Vindhyas.

=== Other references ===
The Iron pillar of Delhi inscription by King Chandragupta II also mentions the Bahlikas as living on the west side of the Indus River (Sindhu). After crossing the seven mouths of the Indus, King Chandragupta is stated to have defeated the Bahlikas.

Dr. P. E. Pargiter points out that there was another Bahlika settlement in the plains of Punjab, alongside or south of Madradesa.

The Baraca of the Periplus is identified with the Bahlika of Sanskrit texts.

== In legendary accounts ==
According to the Puranic traditions, Dhrshta was one of the nine sons of Manu. From him came a number of clans called Dharshtakas, who were considered Kshatriyas. According to the Shiva Purana, the Dharshtaka princes became rulers of Bahlika.

The Satapatha Brahmana mentions a king named Bahlika Pratipeya, whom it calls Kauravya (Kaurava). It has been pointed out that this Kaurava king is identical with Bahlika Pratipeya of the Mahabharata.

According to the Mahabharata, the king of Bahlika was present at Syamantapanchaka in Kurukshetra on the occasion of a solar eclipse. The name 'Bahlika Desa' originates from the middle son of King Pratipa of Hastinapura, Vahlika, who abandoned his paternal kingdom to live with his maternal uncle in Bahlika, eventually inheriting the kingdom. Thus, being older than King Shantanu, Bahlika was the paternal uncle of Bhishma and predated him.

The people of Balhika presented to Yudhishthira as a tribute ten thousand asses (donkeys), numerous blankets of woolen texture, numerous skins of the Ranku deer, clothes made from jute and woven with threads spun by insects, and thousands of other clothes possessing the color of the lotus, soft sheep-skins, sharp and long swords and scimitars, hatchets, fine-edged battle-axes, perfumes, and gems of various kinds (2.50).

Darada, the king of Bahlika, was the incarnation of Asura Surya. At the time of his birth, the earth was cleaved because of his weight (1.67), (2.43).

The King of Bahlika presented to Yudhishtra a golden chariot yoked with four white Kamboja studs at the time of the Rajsuya ceremony (2.53.5).

Karna fought with and vanquished the Bahlikas, along with the Kambojas of Rajpura, the Amvashthas, the Videhas, the Gandharvas, the fierce Kiratas of the fastness of Himavat, the Utpalas, the Mekalas, the Paundras, the Kalingas, the Andhras, the Nishadas, and the Trigartas (7.4.5-6).

King Bahlika participated in the Kurukshetra War. The Mahabharata calls him a mighty (mahabali) king. Along with his son Somadatta and grandson Bhurisravas, King Bahlika participated in the Mahabharata war with one Akshauhini (division) army of Bahlika soldiers and sided with the Kauravas against the Pandavas. Bahlika and his grandson Bhurisravas were among the eleven distinguished generals or Senapatis of the Kaurava army appointed by Duryodhana.

The Ramayana seems to localize the Uttarakurus in Bahlika country. According to the text, Ila, son of Prajapati Karddama, king of Bahli (Bahlika) country, gave up Bahli in favor of his son Sasabindu and founded the city of Pratisthana in Madhyadesa. The princes of the Aila dynasty (which is also the dynasty of the Kurus) were called Karddameya. The Karddameyas obtained their names from the river Kardama in Persia.

Vatsyayana in his Kamasutra records a peculiar custom prevalent among the Bahlikas, where several young men marry a single woman in Bahlika country and in Strirajya. It is said in the Mahabharata that the Pandava brothers (i.e., Kurus) were married to one woman, Draupadi.

Besides the Kurus, the Madra (IAST: Mādra; IPA/Sanskrit: [maːdɽɐ]) were also originally from around Bahlika, as suggested by the Vamsa Brahmana of the Sama Veda. This text refers to one Madragara Shaungayani as a teacher of Aupamanyava Kamboja.

In the Aitareya Brahmana, the Uttarakurus and Uttaramadras are stated to live beyond the Himalayas (paren himvantam).

The Bahlikas have been equated to Mlechchas in later Sanskrit literature. There is a distinct prophetic statement in the Mahabharata that the mlechcha kings of the Sakas, Yavanas, Kambojas, and Bahlikas, among others, will lead an adharmic rule in Kali Yuga. (3.188.34-36).

== Other references ==
Amarakosha makes references to the Saffron of Bahlika and Kashmira countries. Similar references to Bahlika saffron are also found in the 4th-century AD Raghuvamsa play by poet Kalidasa. Raghuvamsa states that saffron adhered to Raghu's horses.

Brihat Samhita also references the Bahlikas and mentions them alongside Cinas, Gandharas, Sulikas, Paratas, Vaisyas, etc.

Kavyamimamsa by Rajshekhar (10th century AD) lists the Bahlikas with the Sakas, Tusharas, Vokanas, Hunas, Kambojas, Pahlavas, Tangana, Turukshas, etc., and states that they were tribes located in the Uttarapatha division.

The Buddhist play Mudrarakshas by Visakhadutta, as well as the Jain works Parishishtaparvan, refers to Chandragupta's alliance with a Himalayan king named Parvatka. This alliance provided Chandragupta with a composite army made up of the Yavanas, Kambojas, Sakas, Kiratas, Parasikas, and Bahlikas, as stated in Mudrarakshas.

== Bahlika horses ==
=== Bahlika horses in Mahabharata ===
Like Kamboja, the Bahlika region was famous for its horses, which were used by kings in wars.

- Vasudeva Krishna gave Arjuna hundreds of thousands of draft horses from the country of the Balhikas as part of his sister, Subhadra's dowry (1,223).
- Shikhandin's son Kshatradeva used steeds from Balhika in the Kurukshetra War (7,23).
- Bahlika breed horses were among those employed in the Kurukshetra War. Many steeds of the Vanayu, the hilly, the Kamboja, and the Balhika breeds, with tails, ears, and eyes motionless and fixed, possessed great speed, were well-trained, and ridden by accomplished warriors armed with swords and lances (7,34).
- Bhagiratha gave away a hundred thousand horses of the Balhika breed, all white of complexion, adorned with garlands of gold (13,103).
- Dhritarashtra wished to give sixteen cars made of gold, each drawn by four excellent and well-adorned steeds of uniform color and of the Bahlika breed, to Vasudeva Krishna, who came to talk to him on behalf of the Pandavas (5,86).

=== Bahlika horses in other references ===
The Brahmanda Purana refers to the horses from Bahlika. Similarly, the Valmiki Ramayana refers to the horses of Bahlika, Kamboja, and Vanayu countries as being of excellent breed. Upamitibhavaprapanchakatha singles out horses from Bahlika, Kamboja, and Turuksha as the best. The Abhidhanaratnamala also mentions examples of excellent horses from Bahlika, Persia, Kamboja, Vanayu, Sindhu, and the land bordering on Sindhu.
