= Kirata =

Historical and mythological group of people from the Indian subcontinent

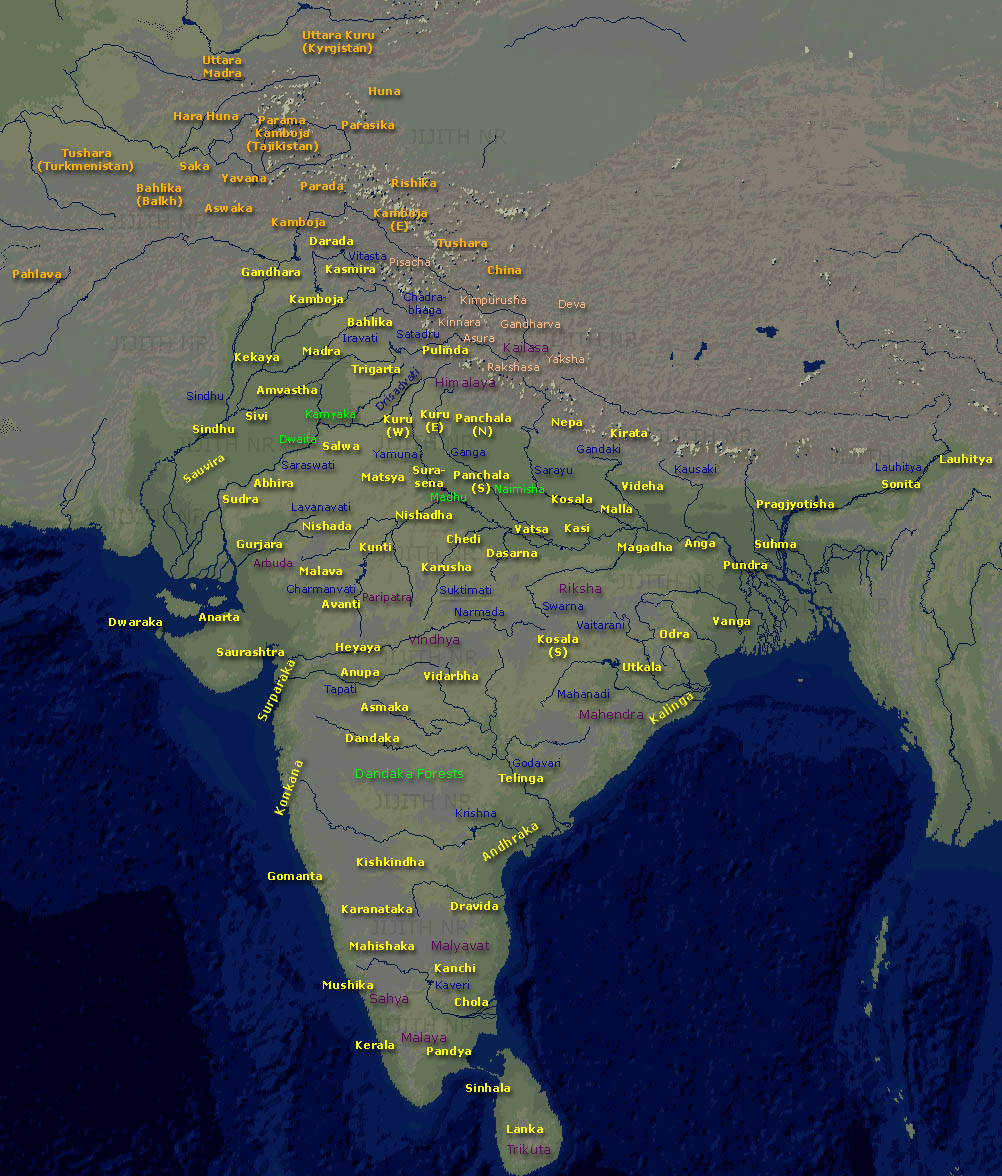
Tribes and nations in the ancient Epic Map of India; Kiratas are described to have lived between Nepa and Videha kingdoms

The Kirāta (Sanskrit: किरात) is a generic term in Sanskrit literature for people who had territory in the mountains, particularly in the Himalayas and Northeast India and who are believed to have been Sino-Tibetan in origin.

== Historical mention and mythology ==
The Kiratas often mentioned along with Cinas (Chinese), and slightly different from the Nishadas, are first mentioned in the Yajurveda (Shukla XXX.16; Krisha III.4,12,1), and in the Atharvaveda (X.4,14). According to Suniti Kumar Chatterji, the name Kirata seems to be used for any non-Aryan hill-folk, however Manu's Dharmashastra (X.44) calls them "degraded Kshatriyas", which Chatterji infers to be a term for people who were advanced in military or civilization to some degree and not complete barbarians. It is speculated that the term is a Sanskritization of a Tibeto-Burman tribal name, like that of Kirant or Kiranti of eastern Nepal.

In the Periplus, the Kirata are called Kirradai, who are the same people as the Pliny's Scyrites and Aelian's Skiratai; though Ptolemy does not name them, he does mention their land which is called Kirradia. They are characterized as barbaric in their ways, Mongoloid in appearance speaking a Tibeto-Burmese language.

The Sesatai (known to Ptolemy and Pliny the Elder as Saesadai or Sosaeadae), who traded the aromatic plant malabathrum, were described – in terms similar to descriptions of the Kirradai – as short and flat-faced, but also shaggy and white.

Ancient Indian texts gives an indication of their geographical position. In the Mahabharata, Bhima meets the Kiratas to the east of Videha, where his son Ghatotkacha is born; and in general, the dwellers of the Himalayas, especially the eastern Himalayas, were called Kiratas. In general they are mentioned as "gold-like", or yellow, unlike the Nishadas or the Dasas, who were dark Austric people.

In Yoga Vasistha 1.15.5 Rama speaks of kirateneva vagura, "a trap [laid] by Kiratas", so about 10th century BCE, they were thought of as jungle trappers, the ones who dug pits to capture roving deer. The same text also speaks of King Suraghu, the head of the Kiratas who is a friend of the Persian King, Parigha.

The meaning of 'Kirat' as is sometime referred as 'degraded, mountainous tribe' while other scholars attribute more respectable meanings to this term and say that it denotes people with the lion's character, or mountain dwellers.

== Modern scholarship ==
Sylvain Lévi (1985) concluded that Kirata was a general term used by the Hindus of the plains to designate the Tibeto-Burman speaking groups of the Himalayas and Northeast.

== See also ==
- Kirata kingdom
- Kirātārjunīya, poem about Arjuna and Shiva (disguised as a Kirata) set in southern India
- Kingdoms of Ancient India
- Kirati people, a modern ethnic group
