= Himalaya kingdom =

Mountainous country mentioned in the Puranas

The Himalaya kingdom was a mountainous country in the Himalayas, mentioned in the Puranas. In the puranas, Himavat was its ruler and his daughter Parvati was a princess from this kingdom. The Indian epic Mahabharata does not mention a kingdom named Himalaya, but mentions many kingdoms in the Himalaya mountains like the Kuninda, Parvata, Nepa, Kirata, Kimpurusha, and Kinnara.

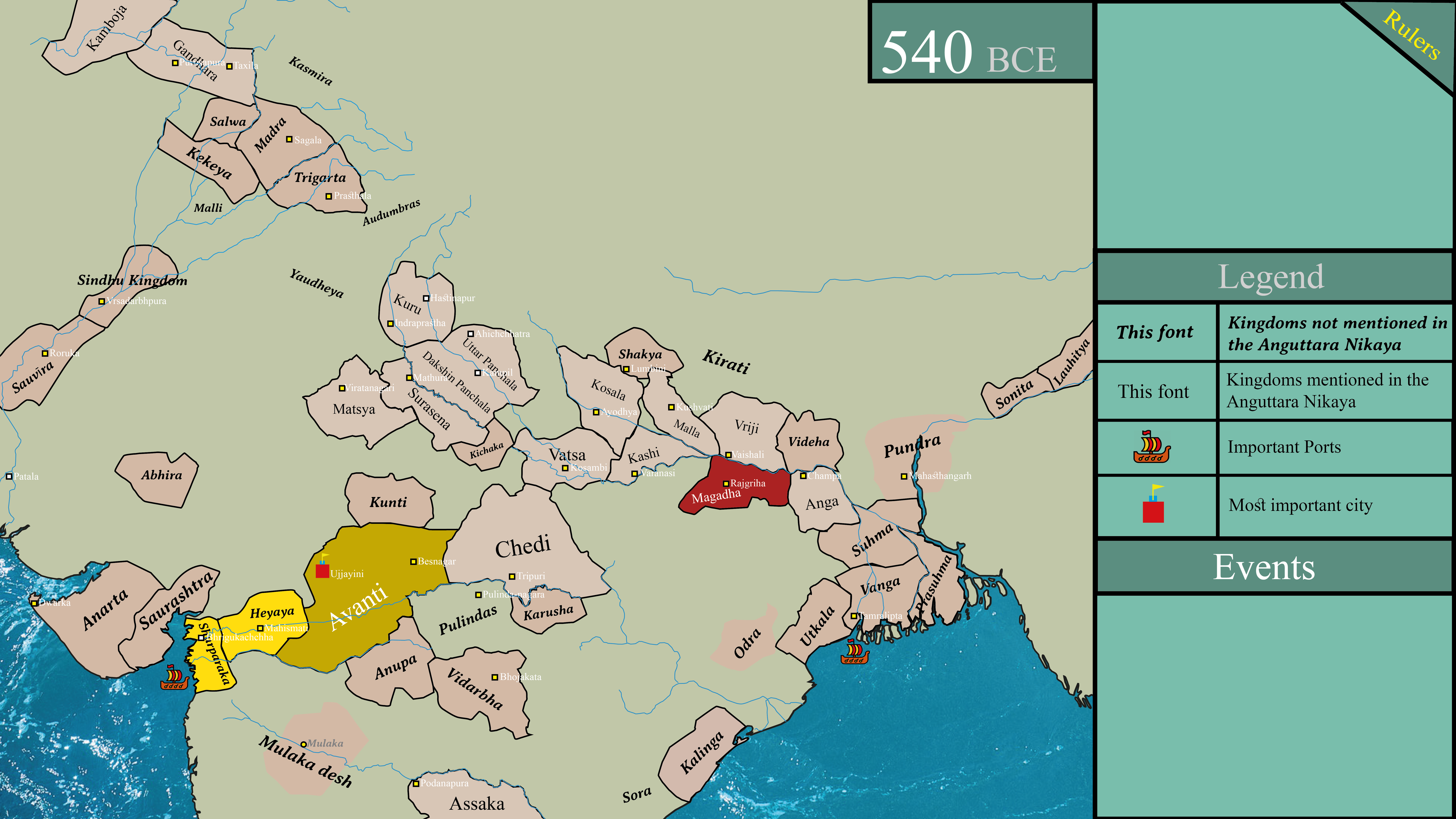
Map depicting 16 mahajanapadas kingdoms and other kingdoms of vedic era India in 540 BCE.

== References in Mahabharata ==
It was told that Arjuna made an expedition to the kingdoms in the mountainous Himalayan regions (2:27). Having conquered all the Himalayas and the Nishkuta mountains and arriving at the White mountains, he encamped on its breast (2:26). Pandavas saw with delight the extensive domains of Suvahu, situated on the Himalayas, abounding in horses and elephants, densely inhabited by the Kiratas and the Tanganas, and crowded by hundreds of Pulindas (3:140). Pandavas were mentioned as mining gold from the gold mines of Himalayas at (14:63,64).

== See also ==
- Kingdoms of Ancient India
- Nepa kingdom
- Parvata kingdom
- Kirata kingdom
