= Daradas =

Ancient ethnic group of India and Pakistan

Daradas were an ancient people who lived north and north-west to the Kashmir Valley. This kingdom is identified to be the Gilgit region, in the Gilgit-Baltistan region (part of ancient Baloristan) along the river Sindhu or Indus. They are often spoken along with the Kambojas. The Pandava hero Arjuna had visited this country of Daradas during his northern military campaign to collect tribute for Yudhishthira's Rajasuya sacrifice. The country of Darada has also been mentioned in the Rasa Ratna Samucchaya, a book dealing about Rasasastra

== Location of Daradas ==
- The Vayu Purana, Brahmanda Purana and Vamana Purana mention the Daradas with the Kambojas, Chinas, Tusharas and the Bahlikas etc. The Bhuvankosha of the Puranas locates the Daradas, Kambojas, Barbaras, Bahlikas, Lampakas etc. in the Uttarapatha division of ancient India. e.g.:

ete desha udichyastu
Kambojah Daradashchaiva Barbarashcha Angalaukikah ||
Chinashchaiva Tusharashcha Pahlavadhayata narah |

- Puranas also refer to river Sindhu as watering the lands of Daradas, Gandharas and the Aurasas (Ursas).
- Brhatsamhita groups the Daradas with the Abhisaras and the Tanganas.
- Mahabharata also mentions the Daradas as neighbors to the Kambojas and Bahlikas.
- Mahabharata locates the country of Daradas in the Himavata-Pradesa.
- Ptolemy refers to the Daradas as living below the sources of the Indus River.
- Herodotus refers to the Daradas as Dadicae and groups them with the Gandharas and the Aparytae. Herodotus and Strabo also connect the Daradas with the gold producing area located in the west of Tibet. There is an evidence that the Daradas, in ancient times, had their colonies located in Baltistan and Leh also.

All the above references locate the Daradas in Uttarapatha as neighbors to Kambojas of Kashmir-Nuristan.

== Struggles in Mahabharata ==
Sabha Parva of Mahabharata attests that Arjuna had led a digvijaya expedition against the Kashmiras, Ursas, Abhisaras, Sinhapuras, Suhmas, Daradas, Kambojas, Bahlikas, Lohas, Rishikas and Parama Kambojas etc.

Drona Parva of Mahabharata attests that Krishna had vanquished the Daradas along with Anga, Vanga, Magadha, Kasi, Kosala, Vatsa, Garga, Karusha, Pundra, Avanti, Daserka, Kashmira, Ursa, Madugalas, Kambojas, Pisachas, Malavas, Sakas, Yavanas etc.

== Daradas in Yudhishtra's Rajasuya ceremony ==
The Daradas, along with numerous other tribes from the northwest (including the Bahlikas, Kiratas, Pahlavas, Paradas, Kambojas, Shakas, Yavanas, Trigartas, Kshudrakas, Malavas, Angas, Vangas, etc.), joined Yudhishtra at his Rajasuya ceremony and brought him numerous gifts.

== Daradas in Kurukshetra war ==
Daradas also participated in the Kurukshetra War fought between the Kauravas and Pandavas. They are variously listed with Sauviras, Bahlikas, Shakas, Yavanas, Pahlavas, Paradas, Kekayas, Kambojas, Madras, Mlecchas, northern and westerner tribes, etc.

== Horses of Daradas ==
Brahmanda Purana refers to the horses from Darada country.

== Daradas in Brahatsamhita of Varahamihira ==
The Daradas are mentioned with the Shakas, Yavanas, Paradas and the Kambojas in the 6th-century AD Brhatsamhita of Varahamihira. They are also mentioned with the Abhisaras in the same text as living on the borders of Kashmir.

== Daradas in Tibetan chronicles ==
The Daradas are mentioned in the Tibetan chronicle Dpag-bsam-ljon-bzah (The Excellent Kalpa-Vrksa), along people like the Yavanas, Kambojas, Tukharas, Hunas, Khasas etc.

== Rajatarangini references to Daradas ==
According to ancient text Rajatarangini of Kalhana, a Sanskrit text from the north, king Lalitaditya Muktapida of Kashmir undertakes to reduce his neighbouring countries. He launches war expedition onto the region of north from Kashmir and first he fights with the Kambojas and deprives them of their horses. Immediately after the Kambojas, he meets the Tukharas. Tukharas do not give him fight, but run away even abandoning their horses in the field. Then Lalitaditiya meets the Bhauttas in Baltistan in western Tibet north of Kashmir, then the Dardas in Karakorum/Himalaya, the Valukambudhi and then he encounters Strirajya, the Uttarakurus and the Pragjyotisha respectively.

Kalhana names several Darada rulers: Acalamangala, during the reign of Ananta of Kashmir, AD 1028 to AD 1063, Vidhyadhara Shahi during the reign of Harsa, 1089–1101 AD, Jagaddala during the reign of Uccala, AD 1101 to AD 1111, Manidhara during the reign of Sussala, AD 1112 to AD 1120), and Yasodhara during the reign of Jayasimha, AD 1128 to AD 1149.

== Epigraphic references to Daradas ==
Three inscriptions on rocks along the Indus and Gilgit Rivers in the southern reaches of the Karakoram provide the earliest epigraphic references to Darada kings. The first inscription is found on rocks where the present-day road between Gilgit and Skardu crosses the Gilgit River, over a bridge known as the Alam bridge, now called the Farhad bridge. The inscription is in poor Kharoshthi, and Fussman has read "daradaraya", meaning "King of the Daradas". The second inscription is found at Chilas Terrace, near to Chilas village along the Indus River, south of the junction of the Gilgit River and the Indus River. It is in Brahmi script. Hinuber has published a transliteration srir daranmaharajavaisrava, which he interprets as daran-maharaja "great king of Daran" or "great king of the Daradas" (1989:57-8). A third inscription is immediately below the Thalpan bridge over the Indus River on the Thalpan side of the bridge. It is also in Brahmi script. Hinuber publishes a transliteration of daratsu maharaja sri vaisravanasena ssatrudamanah, which he translates as "The glorious Vaisravanasena, the subduer of enemies, great King in the land of the Daradas" (1989:59). Hinuber has interpreted these Brahmi inscriptions as referring to the same king Vaiaravanasena, and dates them to the 4th or 5th centuries AD. He remarks that this king "is the second oldest king of the Daradas known by name, preceded only by the daradaraya mentioned at Alam bridge in a Kharoshthi inscription" (1989:59). These inscriptions appear to be the only known self-reference to a Darada people.

== See also ==
- Darada Kingdom
- Kambojas
- Parama Kambojas
- Baloristan
