= Krishna in the Mahabharata =

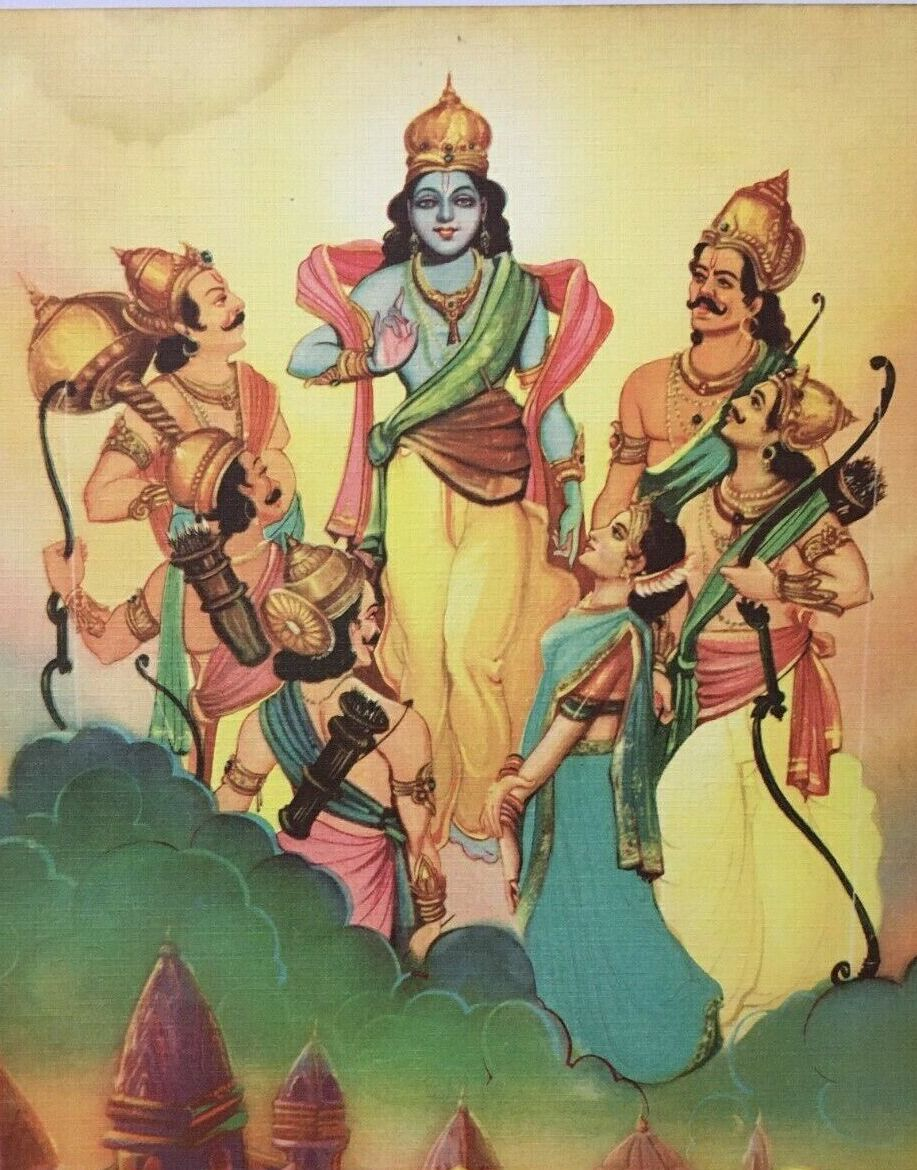
Krishna advising the five Pandavas and their wife Draupadi—the central characters of the Mahabharata, 1940s print

The Hindu god Krishna is a central figure in the Mahabharata, an ancient Indian epic, where he serves as a key participant in its narrative of war, duty, and societal transition. Identified as the human avatar of the god Vishnu, Krishna appears in multiple roles, including counselor, warrior, diplomat, and teacher, influencing the outcomes for the Pandavas and Kauravas, the epic’s rival factions. His involvement highlights themes of righteousness (dharma) and the shift from the Dvapara Yuga to the Kali Yuga, a period associated with moral decline in Hindu cosmology.

Krishna, born to Vrishni clan, enters the epic with a background of notable deeds, such as the killing of Kamsa and the founding of Dvaraka. As a cousin to the Pandavas through his aunt Kunti, and a close associate of Arjuna, Krishna engages with the epic’s characters on both personal and strategic levels, often using diplomacy or divine intervention to support dharma. His absence during events like the dice game and his active participation in moments like Bhishma’s defeat illustrate a complex involvement in the narrative.

The Mahabharata portrays Krishna as a figure whose actions span familial ties and cosmic responsibilities. His relationship with the Pandavas begins early and intensifies through the war, while his divine identity as Vishnu, recognized by figures like Vyasa and revealed to Arjuna, shapes his broader significance.

== Epithets ==
According to scholar Vettam Mani, the following names and epithets are used for Kṛṣṇa in the Mahābhārata:

- Acyuta
- Adhideva
- Adhokṣaja
- Ādideva
- Aja
- Amadhya
- Anādi
- Anādimadhyaparyanta
- Anādinidhana
- Anādya
- Ananta
- Andhakavṛṣṇinātha
- Asica
- Ātman
- Avyakta
- Avyaya
- Bhojarājanyavardhana
- Bhūteśvara
- Bhūtapati
- Bhūtātman
- Bhūteśa
- Cakradhara
- Cakradhārī
- Cakragadābhṛt
- Cakragadādhara
- Cakragadāpāṇi
- Cakrapāṇi
- Cakrāyudha
- Dāśārha
- Dāśārhabhartā
- Dāśārhādhipati
- Dāśārhakulavardhana
- Dāśārhanandana
- Dāśārhanātha
- Dāśārhasiṃha
- Dāśārhavīra
- Dāmodara
- Devadeva
- Devadeveśa
- Devadeveśvara
- Devakīnandana
- Gadāgraja
- Garuḍadhvaja
- Gopāla
- Gopendra
- Gopījanapriya
- Govinda
- Haladharānuja
- Hari
- Hṛṣīkeśa
- Janārdana
- Kaṃsakeśiniṣūdana
- Kaṃsaniṣūdana
- Kaustubhabhūṣaṇa
- Keśava
- Keśihā
- Keśihantā
- Keśiniṣūdana
- Keśisūdana
- Mahābāhu
- Pītavāsas
- Ramānātha
- Rāmānuja
- Śaivyasugrīvavāhana
- Śambhu
- Śaṅkhacakragadādhara
- Śaṅkhacakragadāhasta
- Śaṅkhacakragadāpāṇi
- Śaṅkhacakrāsipāṇi
- Śārṅgadhanurdhara
- Śārṅgadhanvā
- Śārṅgagadāpāṇi
- Śārṅgagadāsipāṇi
- Śārṅgī
- Śauri
- Śūlabhṛt
- Sūlī
- Saṅkarṣaṇānuja
- Sarvadāśārhahartā
- Sarvanāgaripudhvaja
- Sarvayādavanandana
- Satya
- Suparṇaketu
- Tārkṣyadhvaja
- Tārkṣyarakṣaṇa
- Trailokyanātha
- Triyuga
- Vāsudeva
- Vasudevaputra
- Vrajanātha
- Vṛṣṇiśārdūla
- Vṛṣṇiśreṣṭha
- Vṛṣṇikulodvaha
- Vṛṣṇinandana
- Vṛṣṇipati
- Vṛṣṇipravara
- Vṛṣṇipuṅgava
- Vṛṣṇisattama
- Vṛṣṇisiṃha
- Vṛṣṇijīva
- Vṛṣṇyandhakapati
- Vṛṣṇyandhakottama
- Yādava
- Yādavaśārdūla
- Yādavaśreṣṭha
- Yādavāgrya
- Yādavanandana
- Yādaveśvara
- Yaduśārdūla
- Yadūśreṣṭha
- Yadūdvaha
- Yadupuṅgava
- Yadusukhāvaha
- Yadūttama
- Yaduvaṃśavivardhana
- Yogeśvara
- Yogīśa
- Yogī

== Background ==
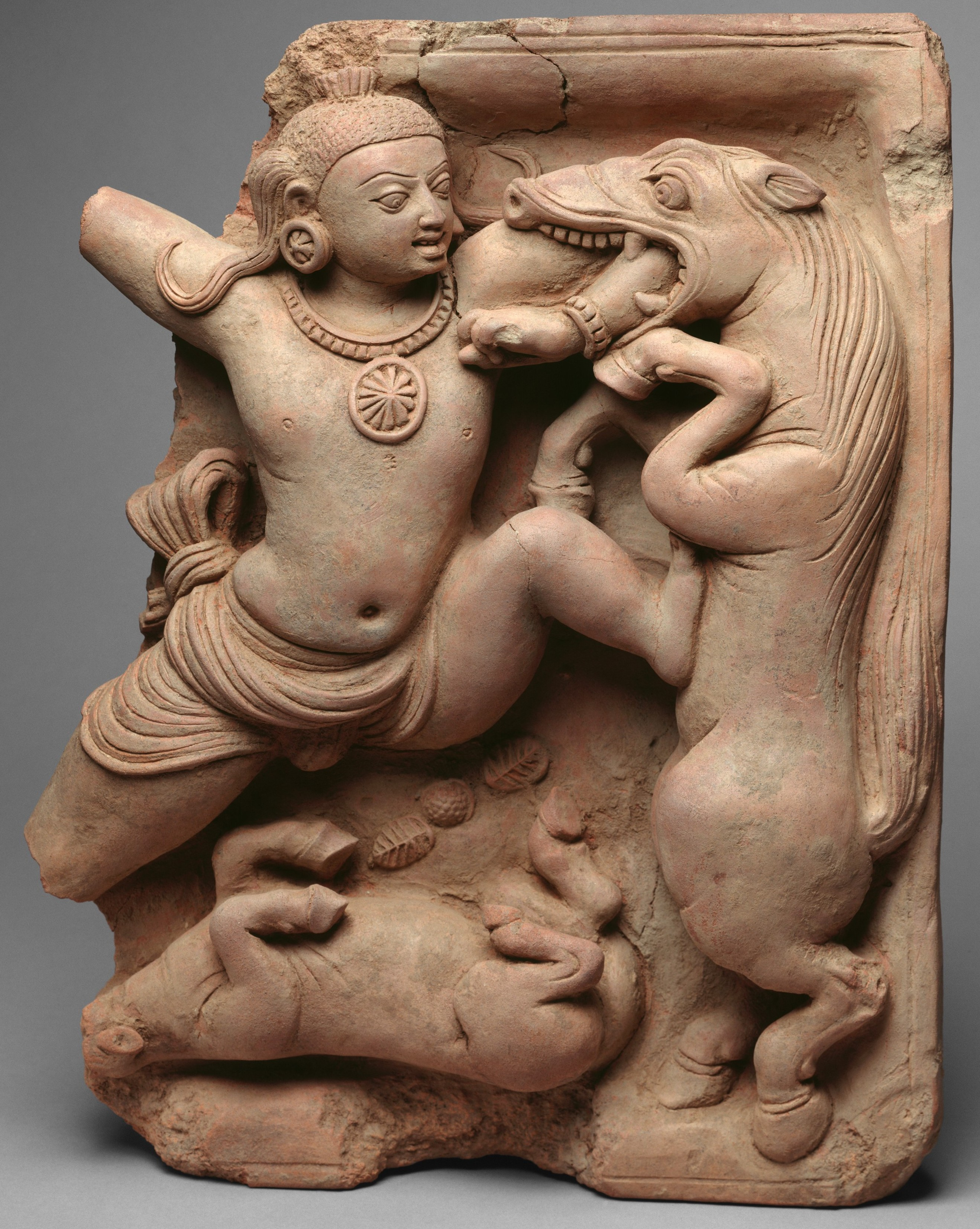
Krishna's childhood deeds, such as killing of the horse demon Keshi (pictured), are referenced throughout the epic, even though these stories are not narrated in the Mahabharata itself but rather in its later appendix, the Harivamsha; sculpture from Gupta period (ca. 321–500), Metropolitan Museum of Art.

Krishna’s background prior to the Mahabharata’s main events is referenced in the epic and detailed in related texts, particularly the appendix Harivamsha, establishing his identity and capabilities before his involvement with the Pandavas and Kauravas. He is born in Mathura to Devaki and Vasudeva, as their eighth child. A prophecy predicts that Devaki’s eighth son will kill Kamsa, her brother and the usurping king of Mathura, leading Kamsa to imprison the couple and kill their first seven children at birth. Krishna’s birth occurs under divine circumstances: Vishnu takes form as Krishna, and Vasudeva, aided by supernatural means, carries the newborn across the Yamuna River to Gokul on the night of his birth, exchanging him with the daughter of Nanda and Yashoda, cowherds who raise Krishna. Krishna grows up in Vrindavan among the Gopas and Gopis, a pastoral community, where he performs a series of acts documented in the Mahabharata and elaborated in texts like the Harivamsa. He defeats several demons and performs miracles like the lifting of Mount Govardhana. Later, Krishna returns to Mathura, confronts Kamsa in a public arena, and kills him, restoring Ugrasena, Kamsa’s father to the throne. Following this, Krishna relocates the Yadavas to Dvaraka, a fortified coastal city he establishes, where he rules alongside his wife Rukmini and other consorts.

This pre-epic history provides context for Krishna’s role in the Mahabharata. His Yadava lineage connects him to the Pandavas, as Kunti, their mother, is his father Vasudeva’s sister, making him their cousin. His reputation as the slayer of Kamsa and ruler of Dvaraka precedes his interactions with the epic’s characters, lending weight to his later counsel and actions. Additionally, his divine status as Vishnu, acknowledged by the sage Vyasa within the narrative and confirmed through revelations to Arjuna, informs his contributions to the Mahabharata’s events. Beyond family ties, Arjuna and Krishna are also rebirth of divine pair Nara and Narayana respectively. These origins establish Krishna as a figure with both human ties and a divine mission, setting the stage for his extensive involvement in the epic’s conflicts and resolutions.

== Introduction ==
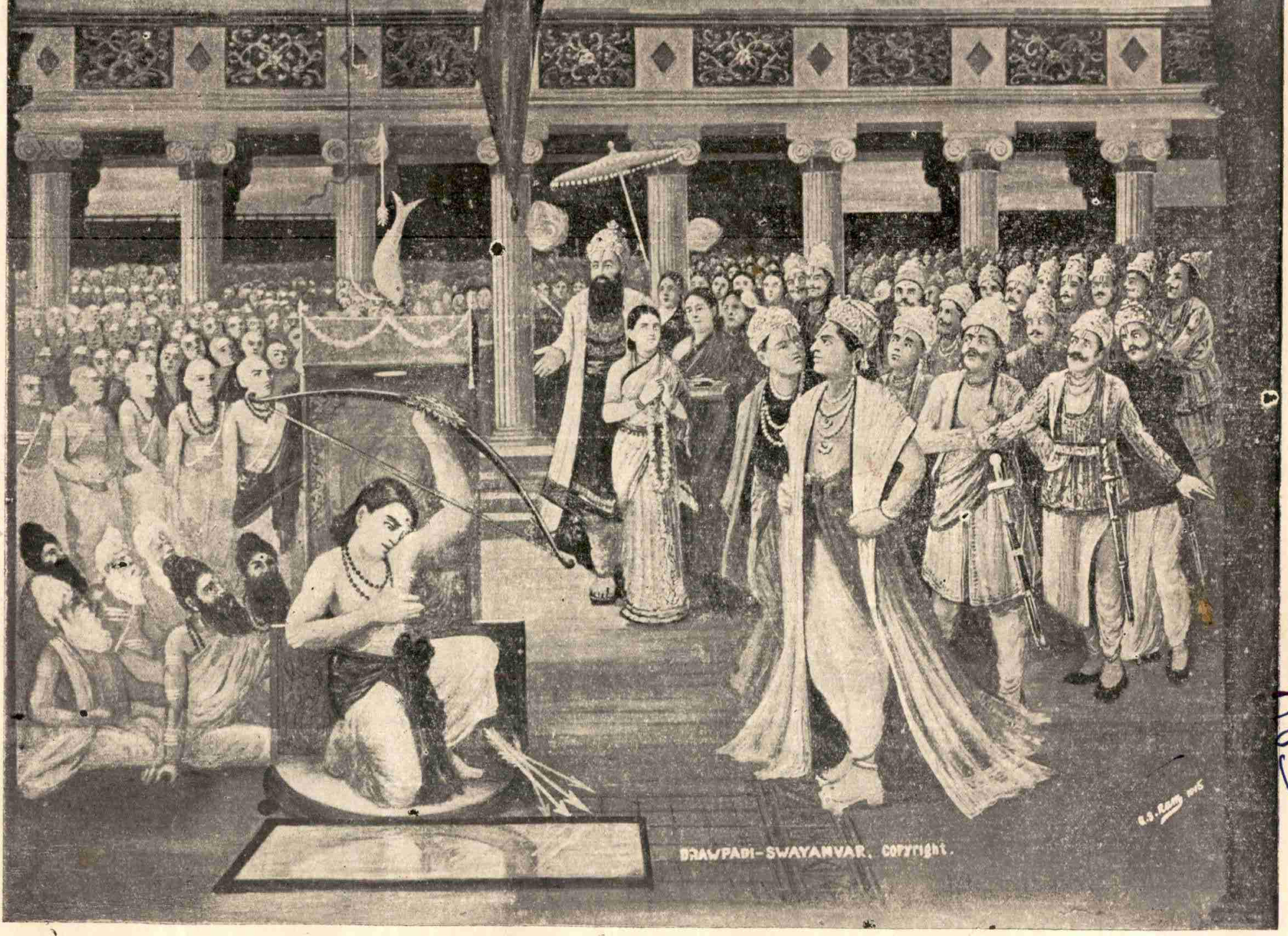
Krishna's introductory scene in the Mahabharata—svayamvara of Draupadi—Krishna in front beside Arjuna

Krishna’s involvement with the Pandavas, the five brothers central to the Mahabharata, as well as his formal entry into the epic's narrative begins formally during the svayamvara (marriage selection ceremony) of Draupadi, a key event narrated in the Adiparvan. Krishna, accompanied by his brother Balarama, attends as a guest among various kings and princes gathered in the kingdom of Panchala. Unlike the other guests, the brothers don't participate in the tournament and instead witness the event as spectators. During the ceremony, Arjuna, disguised as a Brahmin, successfully completes the archery challenge to win Draupadi’s hand by striking a target, an act Krishna observes and acknowledges. Krishna identifies Arjuna as one of the Pandavas and supports his claim to Draupadi, marking the start of a significant alliance between Krishna and the brothers. This connection is reinforced by Krishna’s familial tie to the Pandavas, as their mother Kunti is the sister of Krishna’s father, Vasudeva, making him their cousin.

== Early alliance with the Pandavas ==
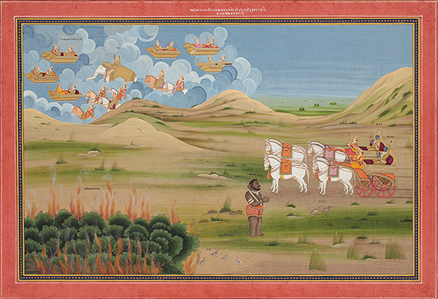
Arjuna and Krishna witness the burning of the Khandava forest, 19th century Rajasthani miniature

=== Indraprastha and Rajasuya ===
Krishna is actively involved in several key events following Draupadi's Svayamvara. He stays with the Pandavas for a time after their marriage and plays a role in their acceptance of half the Kuru kingdom, leading them to Khandavaprastha and assisting, along with Vyasa, in transforming it into Indraprastha. Later, during Arjuna's visit to Dvaraka, Krishna secures the marriage between his sister, Subhadra, and Arjuna and participates in the birth ceremonies of their son, Abhimanyu. During his stay, Krishna witnesses the burning of the Khandava forest and requests the Asura Maya to construct a magnificent hall for the Pandavas, a structure that later humiliates Duryodhana, the eldest Kaurava, and fuels his envy.

Krishna is also consulted by Yudhisthira regarding the Rajasuya sacrifice, which he supports. Before the ritual, he aids in eliminating King Jarasandha, Yudhisthira’s main rival, and later prevents disruptions by killing Shishupala. (Note: One notable instance is his role in the defeat of Jarasandha, the king of Magadha, who is an adversary of both the Yadavas and the Pandavas. Jarasandha had imprisoned numerous kings with the intent of sacrificing them, posing a threat to regional stability. Krishna proposes a plan whereby he, Arjuna, and Bhima travel to Magadha in disguise; Krishna then arranges for Bhima to challenge Jarasandha to a wrestling match. Bhima defeats Jarasandha by tearing him apart, freeing the captive kings and enhancing the Pandavas’ alliances across neighboring realms.) During the Rajasuya, Krishna was offered the first honors, leading to a confrontation. Figures like Bhishma defend Krishna, citing various gunas (qualities) he possesses. Shishupala insults Krishna repeatedly, and after enduring a set number of offenses—specified in the narrative as one hundred, based on a prior promise to Shishupala’s mother—Krishna uses his Sudarshana Chakra, a discus-like weapon, to behead Shishupala. This act resolves the conflict, allowing the Rajasuya to proceed and Yudhishthira to be recognized as emperor.

=== Game of Dice ===
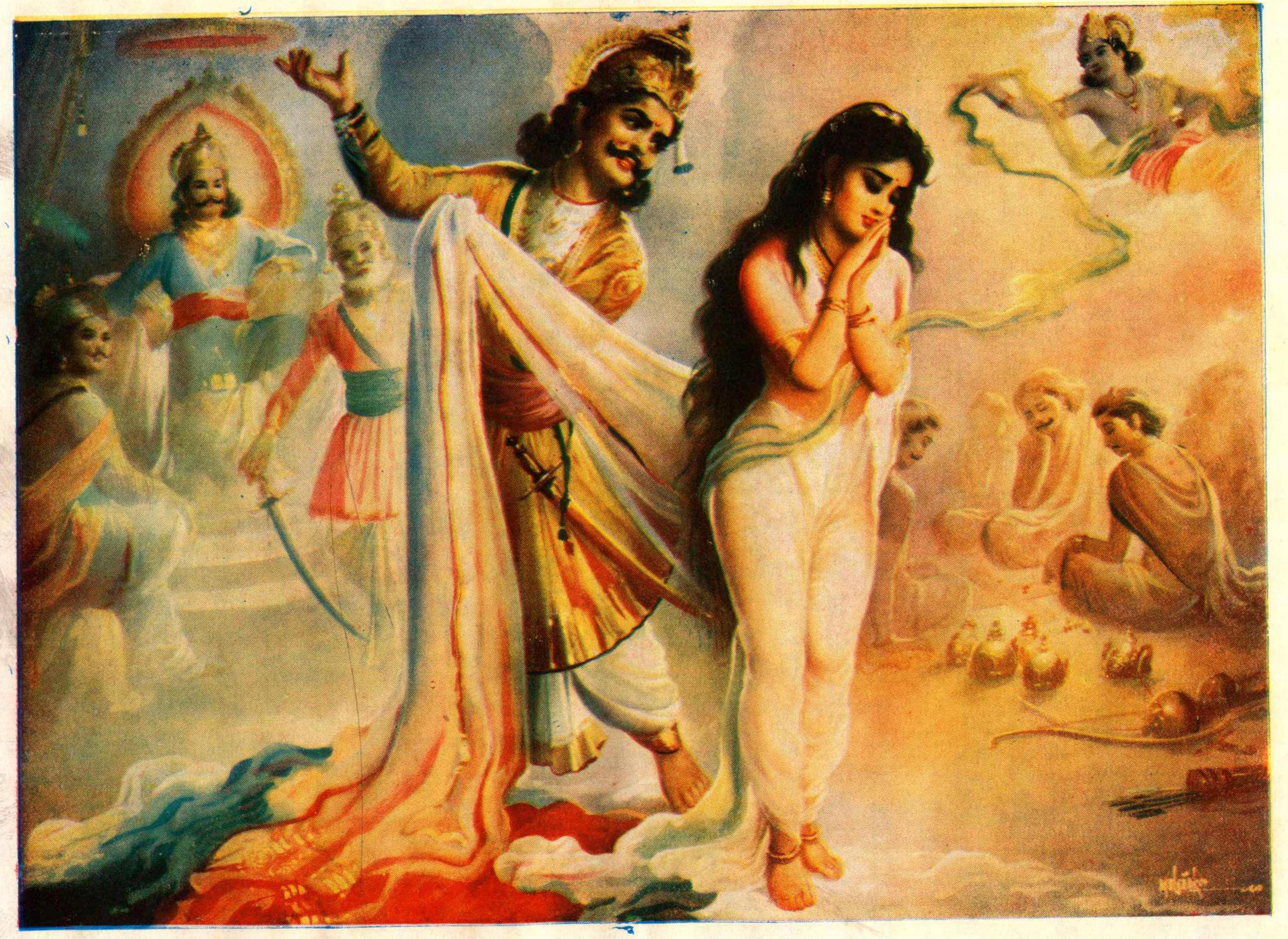
Krishna miraculously saves Draupadi, early 20th century illustration depicting the popular narrative

However, after the successful Rajasuya, Krishna returns home and is absent during the critical dice games that lead to the Pandavas’ downfall. Some scholars, such as Walter Ruben, interpret his absence as evidence that the original narrative may not have included Krishna. Duryodhana invites Yudhishthira to a gambling match orchestrated by Shakuni, Duryodhana’s uncle, who uses loaded dice to ensure victory. The Pandavas lose their wealth, kingdom, and eventually Draupadi, who is staked and summoned to the assembly. At the time, Krishna is engaged in a battle against the king Salva and thus not physically present, but a well-known tradition depicts Krishna appearing during the dice game when Draupadi, in distress over Dushasana’s attempt to disrobe her, calls on him for help. Though physically absent, Krishna miraculously provides an endless stream of cloth to protect her honor, a divine intervention that underscores his role as her protector. This episode appears in multiple versions of the text (see Critical Edition notes). However, Franklin Edgerton’s research on the Sabhaparvan Critical Edition confirms that this account is an interpolation.

=== Forest visits ===
Krishna’s absence during the dice game is later addressed during his first visit to the Pandavas at the start of their exile in the forest, as described in the Vanaparvan. By this point, the Pandavas have already received visits from Vidura and Maitreya, whose discourses provide moral lessons rather than advancing the epic’s main events. Krishna visits twice more, with the third visit being an interpolation. Unlike previous visitors, Krishna does not deliver moral tales; instead, his visit directly relates to the events of the Sabhaparvan and their aftermath. The primary purpose of this visit is to reaffirm his bond with the Pandavas after his absence during their humiliation. Through conversations with Yudhisthira, Arjuna, and Draupadi, Krishna reinforces his allegiance. He reassures Yudhisthira, promising future consecration and vengeance against their enemies. Arjuna, in turn, calms Krishna’s anger by recalling their divine identities as Nara and Narayana.

The most significant exchange occurs between Krishna and Draupadi, with their relation established that of friendship (sakha-sakhi). Krishna and Draupadi’s exchange highlights their mythological identities. Draupadi acknowledges her husbands as Indra’s equals and Krishna as Vishnu, the sacrificer and the sacrifice itself. She questions how, despite her divine associations, she could suffer such humiliation. Krishna responds by assuring her that the wives of her enemies will also grieve as their husbands fall in battle. He vows to restore her status, declaring that she will be the queen of kings and that his word is unbreakable. Symbolically, Draupadi, as Śrī (Prosperity), embodies royal fortune and is also considered the consort of Vishnu. A later interpolation reinterprets Draupadi as the incarnation of Indra's wife, Shachi, allowing Śrī to be associated instead with Krishna’s wife, Rukmini.

In his second visit, Krishna is accompanied by his third wife, Satyabhama, while in the third interpolated one, he saves the Pandavas from the fury of the sage Durvasa.

== Diplomacy and peace mission ==
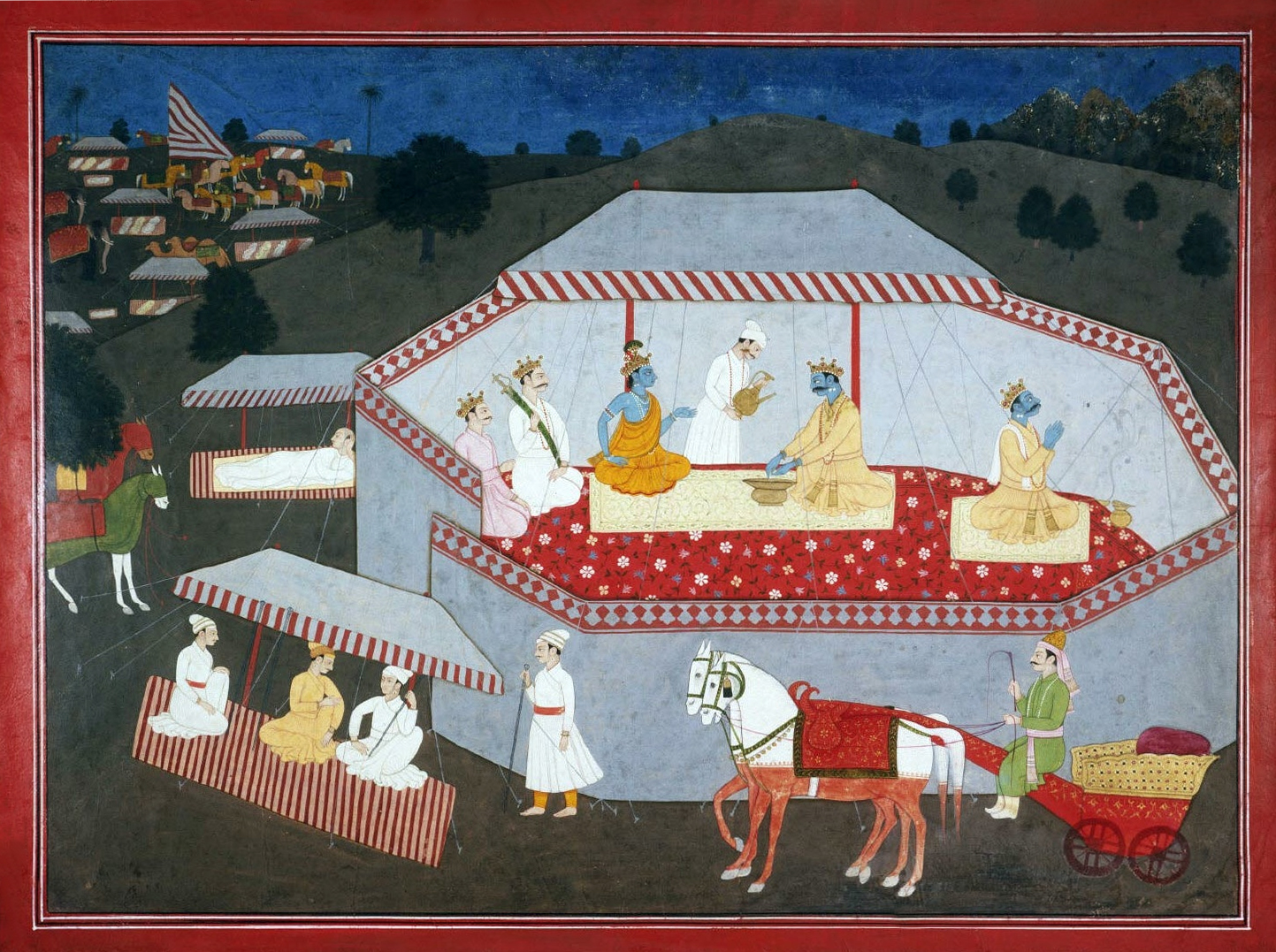
Arjuna chooses Krishna, Pahari miniature

As the Pandavas complete their thirteen-year exile and demand their kingdom, Krishna emerges as a diplomat to avert the looming war. After the Pandavas successfully complete their year of concealment at King Virata’s court, Krishna brings Subhadra and Abhimanyu to join them and attends Abhimanyu’s wedding to Uttara. This visit extends into the Udyogaparvan, the book of war preparations.

At Upaplavya, Krishna advises the Pandavas to demand that Duryodhana honor the dice game’s terms and return Yudhisthira’s half of the kingdom. Before departing for Dvaraka, Krishna emphasizes his supposed neutrality, stating that he wishes well for both sides while they remain occupied with each other. However, he also warns that if Duryodhana refuses, the Pandavas should summon him and other allies. Aware that Duryodhana will also seek support, the Pandavas move quickly. Both sides send envoys to Krishna—Duryodhana for the Kauravas and Arjuna for the Pandavas. They arrive while Krishna is asleep: Duryodhana sits near his head, while Arjuna stands humbly at his feet. Upon waking, Krishna sees Arjuna first. Duryodhana claims priority for arriving first, citing a principle that favors early requests. Krishna acknowledges this but counters that Arjuna, being younger, has the first choice. Krishna then offers a decision: either a massive force of his Narayana troops or Krishna himself, unarmed and not fighting. Arjuna immediately chooses Krishna, while Duryodhana, delighted, takes the army. After Duryodhana departs, Krishna agrees to be Arjuna’s charioteer, marking a pivotal moment in the war’s buildup.

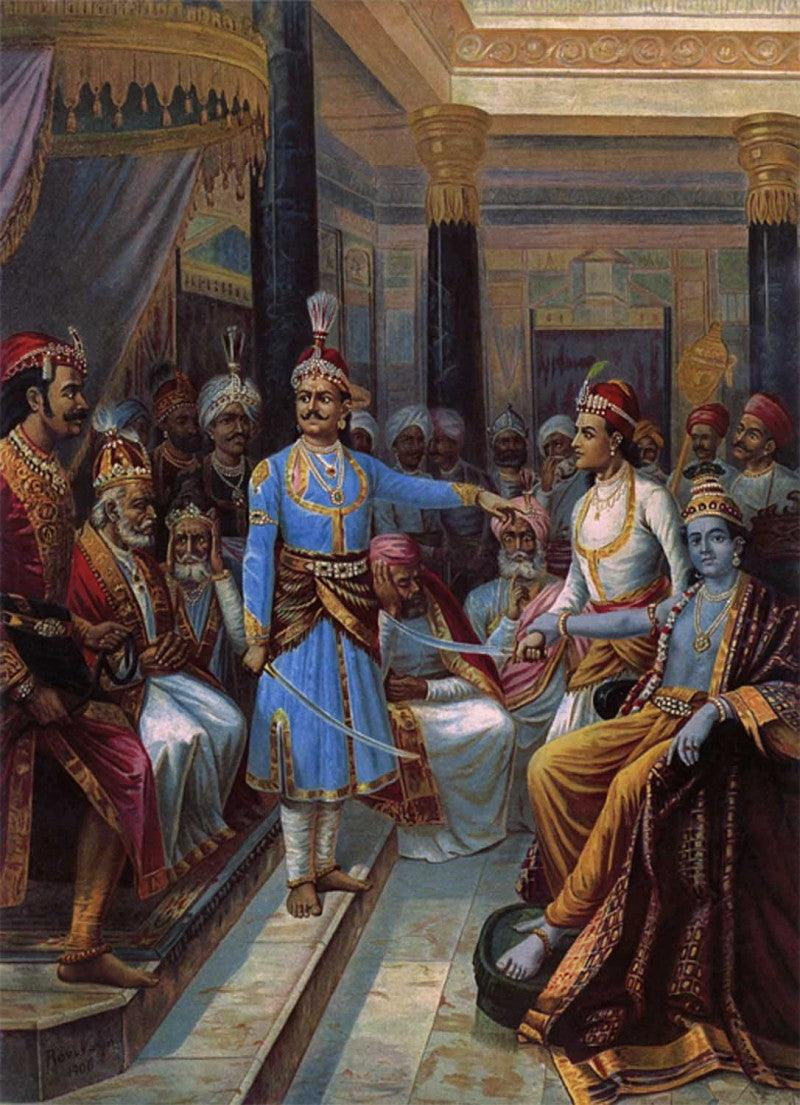
Duryodhana insults Krishna in the court of Hastinapura, while the latter stops Satyaki from striking. A scene from the Udyoga Parva painted by Raja Ravi Varma

Krishna is the last of three envoys seeking peace between the Kauravas and Pandavas, though he expects war. As he tells Yudhisthira (Udyogaparvan), his mission is to demonstrate Yudhisthira’s virtue and expose Duryodhana’s transgressions, persuading both the assembled kings and the broader public. While advocating for peace, he intends to observe the enemy’s stance, all the while anticipating conflict.

Setting out after a morning ritual, Krishna travels with Satyaki and a contingent of warriors. His journey is marked by auspicious signs wherever he goes, while calamities occur elsewhere. Hospitality plays a key role in this episode. Krishna first stops at Vrikasthala, one of the five towns Yudhisthira demands from Duryodhana to resolve conflict. Duryodhana prepares elaborate pavilions to receive him, but Krishna, avoiding entrapment, does not even glance at them. Upon reaching Hastinapura, Dhritarashtra arranges a grand reception and offers him Duhsasana’s mansion, the finest in the city. Krishna instead stays with Vidura. Later, he visits Duryodhana’s palace but refuses his lavish hospitality, declining gifts and feasts, reaffirming his independence. Krishna’s repeated rejections of wealth and luxury parallel other mythological figures resisting temptation.

In the Kaurava court, Krishna addresses an assembly that includes key figures and the Mahabharata records Krishna’s speech as an attempt to balance diplomacy with a clear delineation of the stakes involved. (Note: Krishna presents a case for reconciliation, urging Duryodhana to share the kingdom with the Pandavas and warning of the catastrophic consequences of war, including widespread loss of life and destruction. He emphasizes the Pandavas’ rightful claim to their inheritance and the Kauravas’ obligation to honor the exile’s terms, framing his appeal in terms of justice and familial duty.) Duryodhana rejects Krishna’s proposal and, with his allies, devises a plan to capture Krishna during the negotiations. Satyaki, a Yadava warrior loyal to Krishna, alerts him to the scheme. In response, Krishna reveals his vishvarupa, a cosmic form described as encompassing all aspects of creation and destruction, visible to the assembly. Figures like Bhishma and other sages present recognize Krishna’s divine nature and offer reverence, while Duryodhana remains defiant, refusing to alter his stance. The peace mission’s failure marks a turning point, shifting Krishna’s role from mediator to active supporter of the Pandavas in the ensuing war. Following this event, Krishna attempts to persuade the warrior Karna to abandon Duryodhana and join the Pandavas, revealing his true Kshatriya lineage as Kunti’s son and offering him kingship, but Karna refuses, choosing loyalty to Duryodhana over personal gain. Krishna returns to the Pandavas, preparing them for the Kurukshetra war, which becomes inevitable due to the Kauravas’ intransigence.

== Kurukshetra War ==
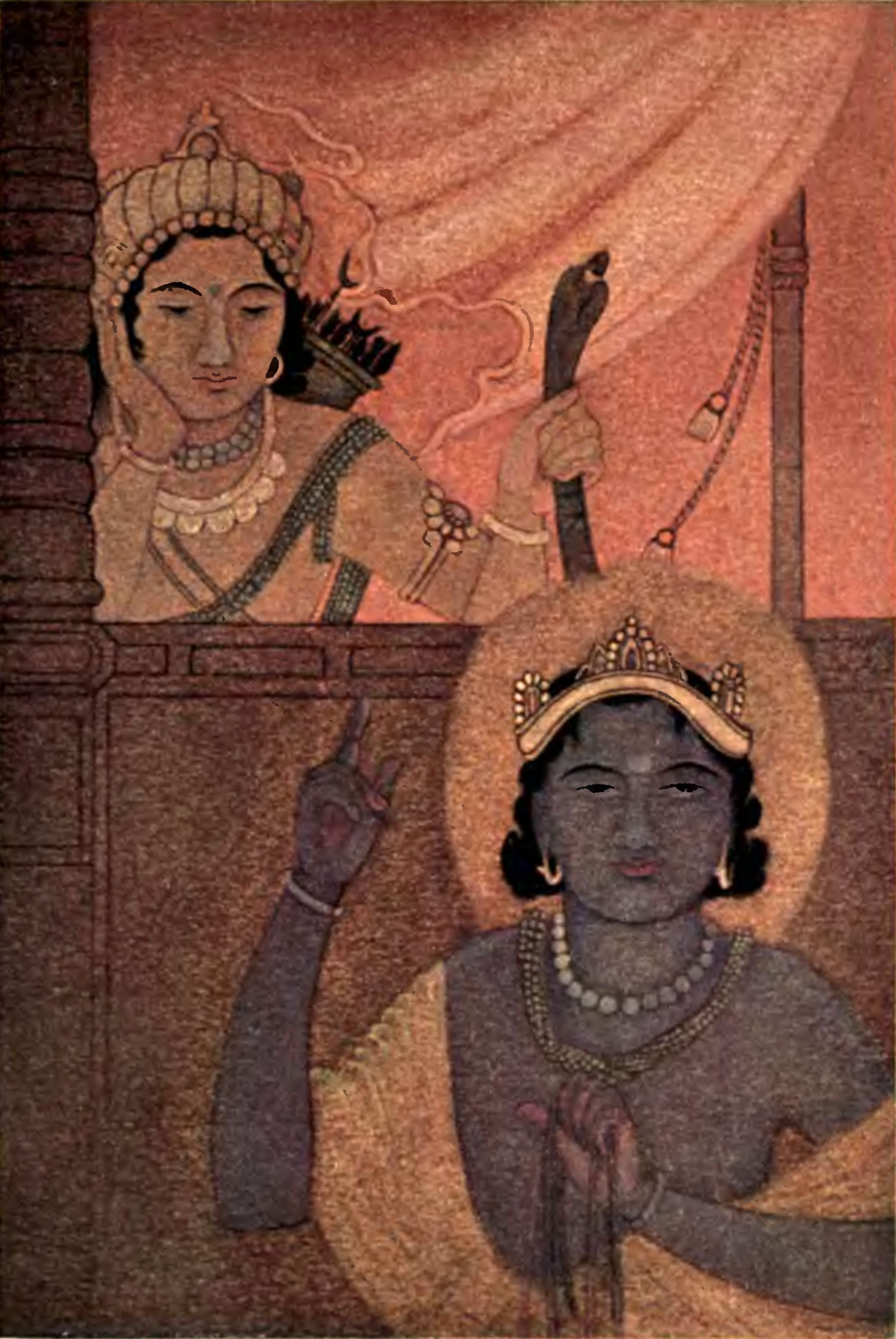
Krishna teaches Bhagavad Gita to Arjuna, painting by Nandalal Bose

The eighteen-day Kurukshetra war marks Krishna’s most active role in the Mahabharata, where he becomes Arjuna's charioteer as a non-combatant. During the Kurukshetra War, Krishna played multiple roles as a strategist, protector, guide, and diplomat, ensuring the Pandavas' victory. His most significant contribution was delivering the Bhagavad Gita when Arjuna hesitated to fight, explaining the principles of dharma, selfless action, and devotion. At the war’s commencement, he blew his conch, Panchajanya, signaling the start of battle.

=== Bhagavad Gita ===
Before the battle, Krishna delivers the Bhagavad Gita to Arjuna, who falters at the sight of his kin—Bhishma, Drona, and others—on the opposing side. In this 700-verse discourse, Krishna expounds on dharma, urging Arjuna to fight as a duty without attachment, revealing himself as Vishnu and displaying the vishvarupa—a vision of infinite forms affirming his cosmic role. This teaching resolves Arjuna’s crisis.

=== Krishna as strategist ===
During the war, Krishna’s strategies are integral in ensuring the Pandavas' victory, but these raise complex ethical questions, particularly regarding the balance between dharma (righteousness) and political necessity. While Krishna is often depicted as the upholder of moral order, his actions in the epic frequently involve strategic deception, manipulation, and direct involvement in actions that could be considered violations of conventional dharma.

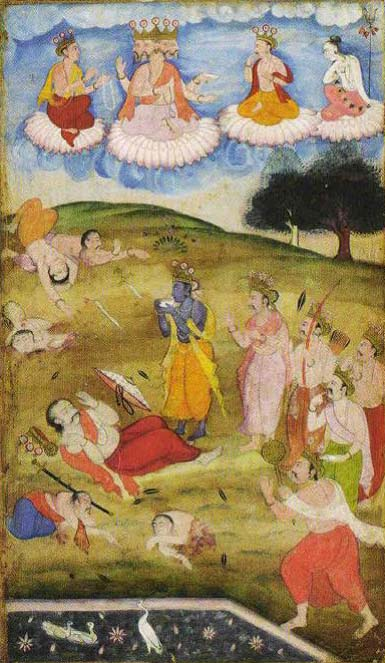
Krishna declaring the end of Mahabharata War by blowing the Conch Shell, a folio from Razmnama, 16th century Persian translation of the Mahabharata

Throughout the war, Krishna facilitates the deaths of key Kaurava warriors, often through means that contradict traditional warrior ethics (Kshatriya dharma), that the epic calls as "sins". At one point, after lack-lustre performance from Arjuna, Krishna attempts to kill Bhishma with his Chakra, breaking his vow to remain a non combatant, but Bhishma surrenders while Arjuna prevents (Bhishma Parva, Ch. 65). However, Krishna later ensures that Arjuna's victory against Bhishma. On the tenth day, he positions Shikhandi—born female and thus immune to Bhishma’s vow—before Bhishma, enabling Arjuna to fell him with arrows (Bhishma Parva, Ch. 106). On the thirteenth day, his absence from the field indirectly leads to Abhimanyu’s death in the chakravyuha, a loss that fuels Arjuna’s resolve. Krishna also orchestrates Jayadratha’s death by creating an illusion of sunset, deceiving both friend and foe. (Drona Parva, Ch. 146). Additionally, he ensures that Ghatotkacha engages Karna in battle at midnight, preventing a duel between Arjuna and Karna, that would have led to former's defeat (Drona Parva, Ch. 173). Krishna’s controversial tactics include deceiving Drona with the ambiguous "Ashvatthama is dead" announcement, leading to Drona’s beheading by Dhristadyumna, and urging Arjuna to strike Karna while his chariot is stuck, justifying it as necessary for justice. (Karna Parva, Ch. 60, 90). Krishna also prompts Yudhishthira to kill Shalya after Karna’s death (Shalya Parva, Ch. 7). In the final confrontation, Krishna instructs Bhima to strike Duryodhana’s thighs, violating the conventional rules of combat but ensuring victory (Shalya Parva, Ch. 58). In each case, his actions prioritize the ultimate victory of dharma over rigid adherence to ethical codes.

Krishna’s role aligns with the broader theme of sovereignty in the Mahabharata, wherein rulers and their advisors must navigate moral ambiguities to secure order and justice. His actions parallel those of Indra, the archetypal sovereign in Vedic mythology, who also engages in morally complex deeds to preserve cosmic balance. The epic presents Krishna’s strategic choices as necessary for the establishment of righteous rule.

=== Krishna as protector ===
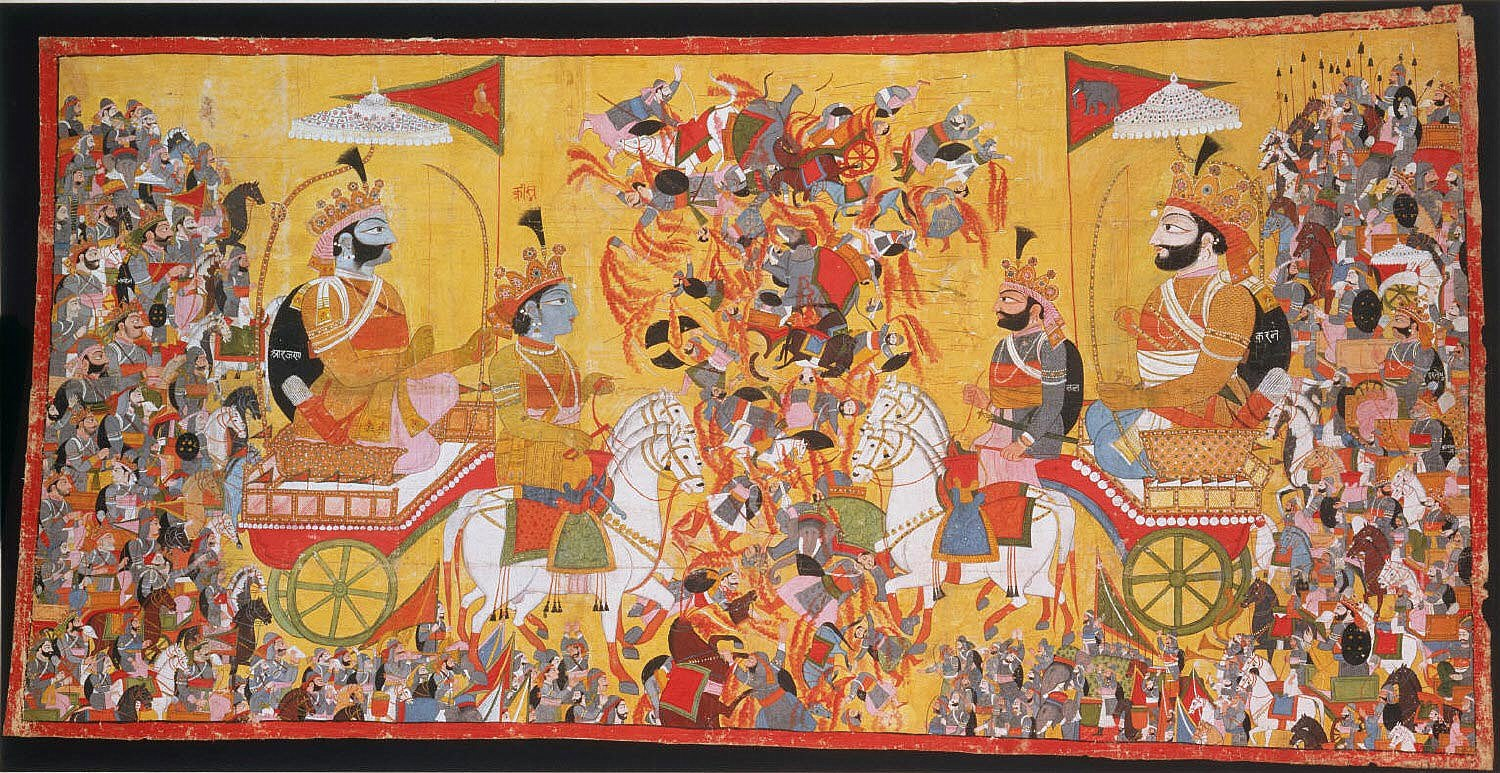
Pahari miniature depicting confrontation between Arjuna and Karna. Krishna is Arjuna's charioteer

Krishna repeatedly shields Arjuna and the Pandavas from danger. When Bhagadatta fires the powerful Vaishnavastra at Arjuna, Krishna absorbs it himself (Drona Parva, Ch. 29, V. 13). During Arjuna’s battle with Karna, he presses down the chariot to deflect Karna’s Nagastra, which would have killed Arjuna (Karna Parva, Ch. 90). He withdraws Arjuna from a direct confrontation with Karna under the pretext of aiding the injured Yudhishthira (Karna Parva, Ch. 64). He also tends to the horses on the battlefield (Drona Parva, Ch. 100).

Beyond physical protection, Krishna provides emotional support. He consoles Arjuna after Abhimanyu’s death and comforts Subhadra, Draupadi, and Uttara in their grief (Drona Parva, Ch. 72-78). When Ghatotkacha is killed, he reassures Yudhishthira (Drona Parva, Ch. 153). He prevents a major conflict between Yudhishthira and Arjuna when Arjuna, in a moment of rage, nearly attacks his elder brother; Krishna calms them by narrating the story of Vyādha and Kauśika (Karna Parva, Ch. 70).

== Aftermath ==
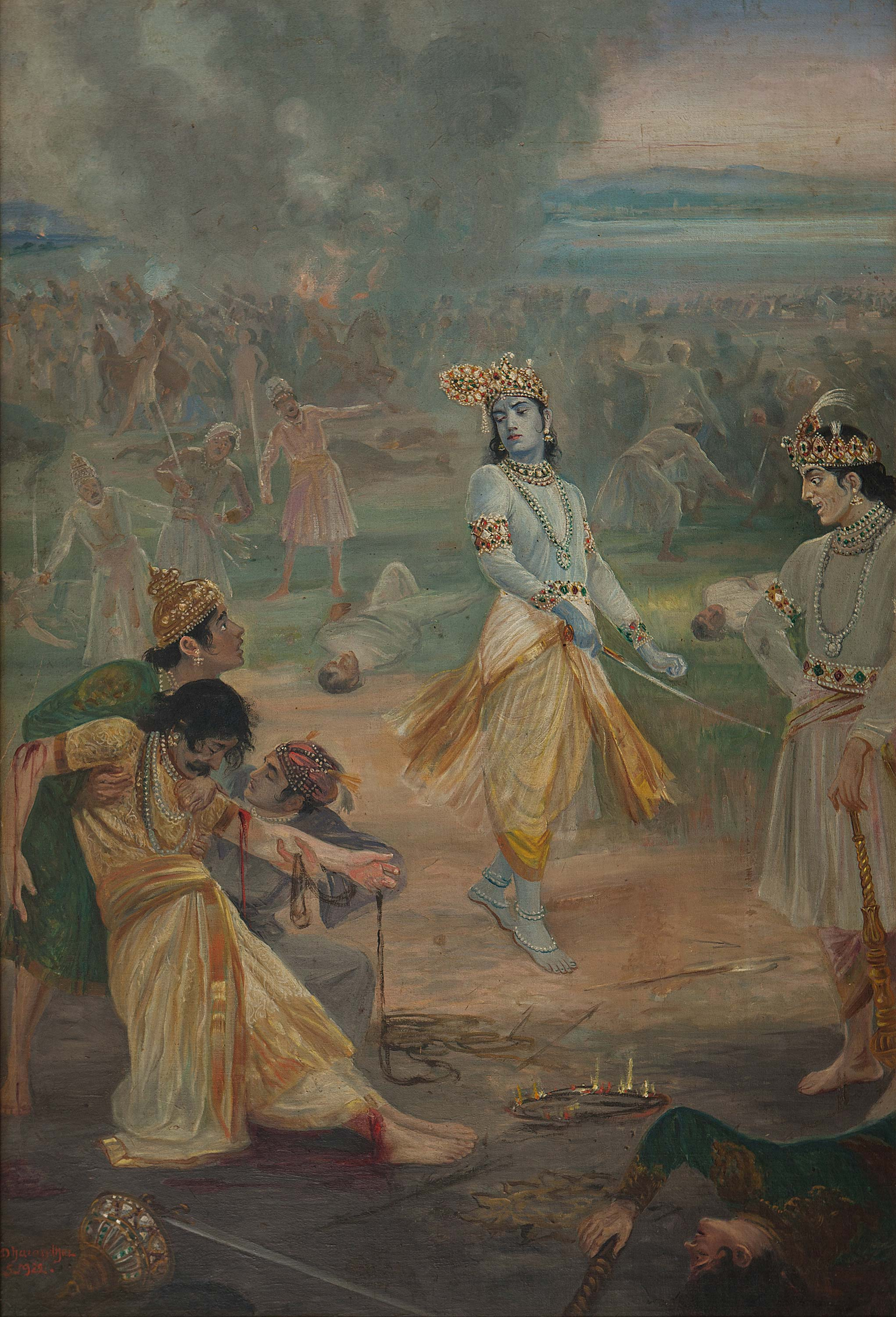
Yadavas killing themselves, with Krishna and his brother Balarama depicted at right. Painting by M. V. Dhurandhar

Following the conclusion of the Kurukshetra war, Krishna remains actively involved in the Mahabharata’s narrative, assisting the Pandavas in reestablishing their authority and addressing the war’s consequences. A significant postwar event involves Ashvatthama, Drona’s son, who seeks revenge for his father’s death, and kills remaining Pandava forces except for the Pandavas, Krishna, Satyaki and Yuyutsu. Ashvattama shoots Uttara's womb with Brahmashira to end Pandavas' lineage; for this act Krishna punishes and curses him. After the win, Krishna accompanies the Pandavas to Hastinapura, the Kuru capital, where they encounter Dhritarashtra and Gandhari, the grieving parents of the fallen Kauravas. Gandhari, mourning the loss of her hundred sons, holds Krishna responsible for not preventing the war despite his capabilities and issues a curse, predicting that the Yadava clan will perish in a fratricidal conflict thirty-six years later, mirroring the Kuru family’s fate. Krishna accepts the curse without resistance, stating it aligns with a predetermined cosmic order. This interaction is recorded in the Mahabharata’s Stri Parva.

Additionally, Krishna ensured the proper transfer of knowledge by instructing Bhishma to teach Yudhishthira about dharma (Shanti Parva) and consoled goddess Ganga over Bhishma’s death. Krishna then supports Yudhishthira’s ascension as king of Kuru, overseeing the performance of the Ashvamedha sacrifice, a Vedic ritual involving a horse’s territorial journey to affirm sovereignty. He provides counsel on the sacrifice’s execution, ensuring Arjuna protects the horse as it traverses various kingdoms, subduing any opposition. He also reiterated the teachings of the Gita in a discussion with sages and Kashyapa (Ashramavasika Parva).

The climax of Krishna’s involvement in the Pandava-Kuru conflict is his revival of Parikshit, Abhimanyu’s son. While Uttara is giving birth, the royal women of Kuru dynasty approaches Krishna. If the child remains stillborn, the Kuru lineage ends. However, Krishna, having vowed to restore him, is reminded of this promise by his sister, Subhadra, the child’s grandmother. She invokes Krishna’s virtues—dharma (righteousness), satya (truthfulness), and satyavikrama (true valor)—and urges him to uphold his word in accordance with cosmic order (ṛta). Krishna fulfills this promise through a miraculous act. First, he withdraws the weapon afflicting the child, then proclaims to the universe that he does not speak falsely. His words revive the baby. This episode emphasizes Krishna’s dual nature—his warrior prowess (kṣatriya qualities) and his commitment to truth. He recalls his undefeated record in battle, his unwavering friendship with Arjuna, and his righteous conquests of Kamsa and Keshin. Simultaneously, he affirms his dedication to dharma, satya, and his respect for Brahmins. His act of truth operates on this dual level: his battlefield valor is validated through his truthfulness.

=== The Destruction of the Yadavas ===
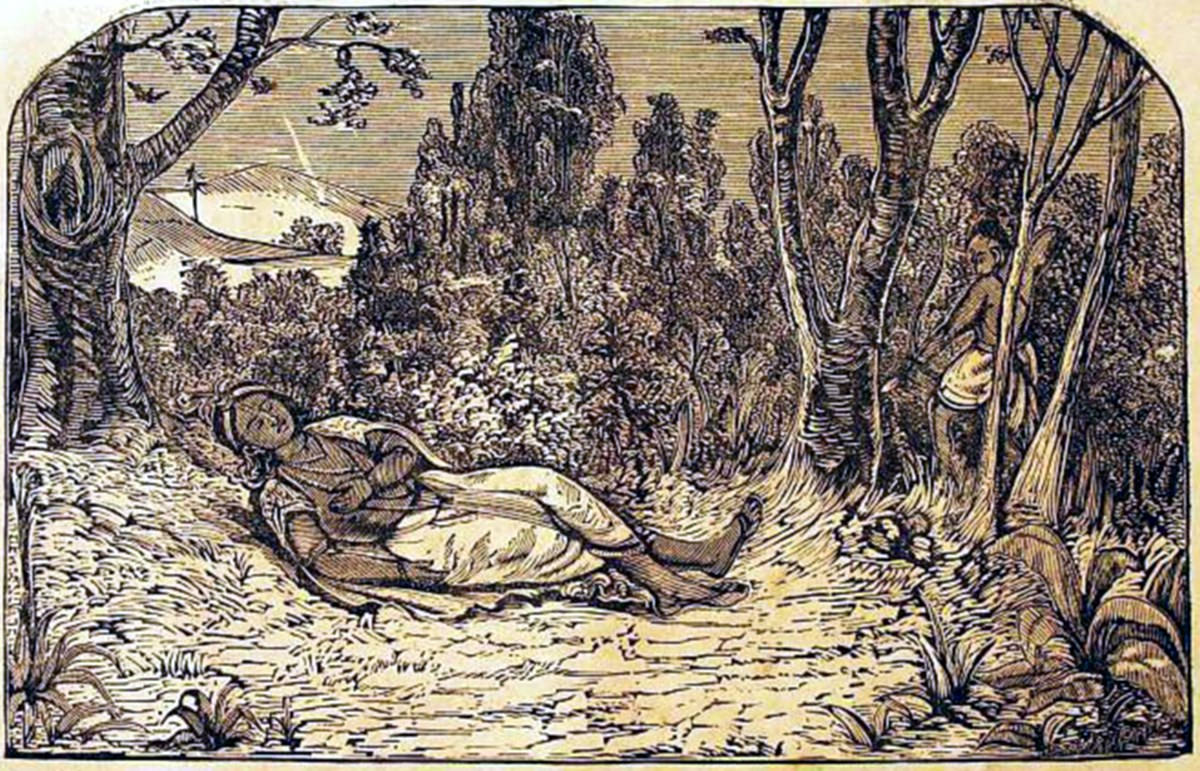
Death of Krishna - illustration from the Barddhaman edition of Mahabharata

Krishna’s role in the Mahabharata extends to the destruction of the Yadava clan, occurring thirty-six years after the Kurukshetra war. The Mausala Parva describes how the Yadavas, including Krishna’s kin, gather at Prabhasa, a coastal pilgrimage site, where ominous signs—such as a meteor shower and the disappearance of Krishna’s Sudarshana Chakra—signal impending doom. During the gathering, a dispute arises among the Yadavas, fueled by intoxication and a mocking reference to the war, escalating into violence.

Krishna attempts to quell the fighting but is unable to prevent the Yadavas—including warriors like Satyaki and Kritavarma—from killing each other with the clubs. As the violence spreads, Krishna joins the fray to defend his immediate family, striking down aggressors, but the majority of the Yadavas perish in the melee. After the massacre, Krishna and his brother Balarama are among the few survivors; Balarama then withdraws to a nearby spot, enters a meditative state, and departs life, his spirit manifesting as the serpent Shesha. Krishna, left alone, observes the Yadavas’ annihilation, which the Mahabharata attributes to both the sages’ curse to his son Samba and Gandhari’s prophecy, marking the decline of the Dvapara Yuga. Krishna retires to a forest near Prabhasa and sits beneath a pipal tree in a meditative posture, with his foot resting on his knee. A hunter named Jara, mistaking Krishna’s foot for the ear of a deer, shoots an arrow tipped with iron from the eraka grass that had earlier killed the Yadavas. The arrow strikes Krishna’s heel, identified in the narrative as his sole vulnerable point, and he succumbs to the wound. Krishna blesses Jara, absolving him of guilt, and his spirit ascends to Vaikuntha, Vishnu’s celestial abode, marking the completion of his avataric role.

Arjuna, upon learning of Krishna’s death and the Yadavas’ fate, travels to Prabhasa to perform the funeral rites for Krishna and Balarama, cremating their bodies. He escorts the surviving Yadava women to Hastinapura, but the sea soon engulfs Dvaraka, submerging Krishna’s city as foretold by earlier omens. Krishna’s death prompts the Pandavas to renounce their kingdom; they undertake a final journey, during which Yudhishthira ascends to heaven and sees Krishna in his divine form among the gods.
