= Kingdom of Malwa =

Kingdom of Malwa may refer to:

- Kingdom of Malwa (350–625), a kingdom in ancient India ruled by the Aulikaras and Kalachuris of Mahishmati
- Kingdom of Malwa (947–1304), a kingdom in early medieval India ruled by the Paramaras
- Malwa Sultanate (1401–1562), a kingdom in late medieval northern India ruled by the Ghurids and Khaljis

== See also ==
- Malwa (disambiguation)
- Avanti Kingdom (disambiguation)
