= Kampil =

Kampil Kampilya
- Town
- Location in Uttar Pradesh, India
- Coordinates: 27.62°N 79.28°E
- Country: India
- State: Uttar Pradesh
- District: Farrukhabad
- Elevation: 145 m (476 ft)

Population (2001)
  - Total: 8,475

Languages
  - Official: Hindi
- Time zone: UTC+5:30 (IST)

Kampil, historically known as Kampilya, is a town and a Nagar panchayat in Farrukhabad district in the Indian state of Uttar Pradesh. It is located about 45 km from Farrukhabad, and 55 km from Budaun. It is a very important place from a historical point of view.

== History ==
Shraman Era

It is believed to be the birthplace of the 13th Tirthankara Bhagwan Shree Vimalnath. This is a Holy Land where the four Kalyanakas—chayavan, birth, diksa and omniscience—of Tirthankara 1008 Bhagawan Shree Vimalnatha, the thirteenth Tirthnakara took place. This place was also graced by the visit of Lord Mahavira. Apart from these, there are many old temples, which signify the historical and religious importance of Kampil. During the epic period, it was the capital of King Drupada, the father of Draupadi. The sacrificial altar (Yajna Kunda) from which Draupadi is believed to have been born from the fire of knowledge, is situated in Kampil. Near the sacrificial altar, there is a structure, which is the hermitage of a sage Kampila, where he used to perform penance.

=== Southern Panchala ===
Southern Panchala kingdom or Panchala-proper, one of the historical mahajanapadas of ancient India (c. 6th to 4th centuries BC), had Kampilya city as its capital. This kingdom extended from the Ganga River to the river Charmanwati. It was annexed into the Nanda Empire during the reign of Mahapadma Nanda. Ahichchhatra was the capital of northern Panchala and Kampilya was the capital of southern Panchala.

By tradition, the temple of Rameshwarnatha Mahadeva is attributed to Shatrughana, brother of Rama. It is said that he had brought the idol (Lingam) of Shiva, which was worshiped by Sita, the wife of Rama in Ashoka Vatika while she was held in captivity in Lanka and installed it in this temple.

=== Mughal era ===
Kampil is listed in the Ain-i-Akbari as a pargana under the sarkar of Kannauj, producing a revenue of 1,651,586 dams for the imperial treasury and supplying a force of 200 infantry and 100 cavalry.

== References of Panchala in Mahabharata ==
=== People from Panchala ===
In Mahabharata, many figures were mentioned as the natives of Panchala:

- Panchali: wife of the Pandavas
- Dhrishtadyumna: commander-in-chief of the Pandavas in Kurukshetra War and brother of Panchali
- Drupada: father of Panchali and Dhristadyumna
- Shikhandi: another son of Drupada (he married from Dasarna – see Dasarna kingdom)
- Prishata: father of Drupada (1,131)
- Satyajit: commander-in-chief of Panchala army under king Drupada
- Sage Dhaumya: priest of the Pandavas (1,185).
- Aruni: a Brahmin boy from Panchala and a disciple of sage Dhaumya (1,3).

Many other sons of Drupada (a total of 10) and other Panchala princes (like Yudhamanyu, Uttamaujas, Janamejaya (8,82) etc.) were mentioned as battling in Kurukshetra War, allied with the Pandavas.

=== Origin of Panchala tribe ===
- Mahabharata, Book 1, Chapter 94: The lineage extending from Puru to Santanu.

The following passage from Mahabharata, that describes the Puru lineage of kings, shows the kinship of the Kurus and the Panchalas, both branched out from the same line.

When Janamejaya wished to hear the history of kings who were descended from Puru, Vaisampayana narrated the lineage of kings in Puru's line.

==== Lineage of Puru kings up to the branching of Panchala tribe ====
Puru had by his wife Paushti three sons, Pravira, Iswara, and Raudraswa. Amongst them, Pravira was the perpetuator of the dynasty. Pravira had by his wife Suraseni a son named Manasyu. Manasyu had for his wife Sauviri. And he begat upon her three sons called Sakta, Sahana, and Vagmi. Raudraswa begat upon the Apsara Misrakesi ten sons. They all had sons. They are Richeyu, Kaksreyu Vrikeyu, Sthandileyu, Vaneyu, Jaleyu, Tejeyu, Satyeyu, Dharmeyu and Sannateyu the tenth.

Amongst them all, Richeyu became the sole monarch and was known by the name of Anadhrishti. Anadhristi had a son of the name of Matinara who became a famous and virtuous king and performed the Rajasuya and the Ashwamedha. Matinara had four sons viz., Tansu, Mahan, Atiratha, and Druhyu. (Amongst them, Tansu of great prowess became the perpetrator of Puru's line). Tansu begat a son named Ilina. Ilina begat upon his wife Rathantara five sons with Dushmanta (Dushyanta) at their head. They were Dushmanta, Sura, Bhima, Pravasu, and Vasu. The eldest of them, Dushmanta, became king. Dushmanta had by his wife Sakuntala an intelligent son named Bharata who became king. Bharata gave his name to the race of which he was the founder. It is from him that the fame of that dynasty hath spread so wide. Bharata begat upon his three wives nine sons in all. But none of them were like their father and so Bharata was not at all pleased with them. Their mothers, therefore, became angry and slew them all. The procreation of children by Bharata, therefore, became vain.

The monarch then performed a great sacrifice and through the grace of Bharadwaja obtained a son named Bhumanyu. Then Bharata, the descendant of Puru, regarding himself as really possessing a son, installed that son as his heir-apparent. Bhumanyu begat upon his wife, Pushkarini six sons named Suhotra, Suhotri, Suhavih, Sujeya, Diviratha and Kichika. During the reign of Suhotra the surface of the whole earth was dotted all over with hundreds and thousands, of sacrificial stakes. Suhotra, begat, upon his wife Aikshaki three sons, viz., Ajamidha, Sumidha, and Purumidha. The eldest of them, Ajamidha, was the perpetuator of the royal line. And he begat six sons,--Riksha was born of the womb of his wife Dhumini; Dushmanta and Parameshthin, of his wife Nili; Jahnu, Jala and Rupina were born of his wife Kesini. Kushikas are the sons of Jahnu.

All the tribes of the Panchalas are descended from Dushmanta and Parameshthin, two sons of the second wife of Puru king Ajamidha.

=== War between Panchalas and the forefathers of Kurus ===
Continuous war between the Kurus and Panchalas led the defeated Kurus to be exiled from their kingdom. They lived in the forests on the banks of Sindhu. Later the Kurus retook their capital.

Riksha who was older than both Jala and Rupina became king. Riksha begat Samvarana, the perpetuator of the royal line. While Samvarana, the son of Riksha, was ruling, there happened a great loss of people from famine, pestilence, drought, and disease. The Bharata princes were beaten by the troops of enemies.

And the Panchalas setting out to invade the whole land with their four kinds of troops soon brought the whole land under their sway. And with their ten Akshauhinis the king of the Panchalas defeated the Bharata prince. Samvarana then with his wife and ministers, sons and relatives, fled in fear, and took shelter in the forest on the banks of the Sindhu extending to the foot of the (western) mountains. There the Bharatas lived for a full thousand years (for a long period), within their fort. After they had lived there a long period, one day the sage Vasishtha approached the exiled Bharatas.

It hath been heard that Vasishtha (becoming the priest) then installed the Bharata prince in the sovereignty of all the Kshatriyas. The king retook the capital that had been taken away from him and once more made all monarchs pay tribute to him. The powerful Samvarana, was thus installed once more in the actual sovereignty of the whole land.

Samvarana begat upon his wife, Tapati (whose abode was on the banks of river Tapati (Tapti, Maharashtra)), the daughter of Surya (a king of the Solar Dynasty), a son named Kuru. This Kuru was exceedingly virtuous, and therefore, he was installed on the throne by his people. It is after his name that the field called Kurujangala (eastern Haryana) has become so famous in the world. Devoted to asceticism, he made that field Kurukshetra sacred by practising asceticism there. He was the founder of the Kuru dynasty and the Kuru kingdom.

It seems that the Samvarana who retook the capital was another king in the line of the exiled king Samvarana. Another interesting fact is that sages in the line of Vasistha, were the priests of Solar Dynasty of kings (especially the Ikshwakus) for many generations. This could be the reason why Samvarana, who took Vasistha as his priest, married from the Solar Dynasty. The history of Samvarana falling in love with Tapati, while he roamed in the vicinity of Tapati river (Tapti river Maharashtra) and Vasistha's help in getting the consent of king Surya, her father, to give her in marriage to Samvaran—all these are mentioned at (1-173,174,175,176).

=== Drupada becomes the king of Panchala ===
- Mahabharata, Book 1: Adi Parva, Chapter 131: The History of Drona

There was a king named Prishata who was a great friend of Bharadwaja. About this time Prishata had a son born unto him, named Drupada. Drupada, the son of Prishata, used every day to come to the hermitage of Bharadwaja to play with Drona and study in his company. When Prishata was dead, this Drupada became the king of the Northern Panchalas. Once Drupada became the king, he forgot his friendship with Drona. Drupada insulted Drona by telling him that he deserved not to be his friend, because Drona was not a king, but a poor Brahmana.

=== The partition of the Panchala kingdom ===
- Mahabharata, Book 1: Adi Parva, Chapter 140: Arjuna takes Drupada captive

Drona defeated Drupada, by means of his disciple Arjuna, to settle his old scores. Drona spoke as follows to the captive Drupada:-

Thou toldest me before that none who was not a king could be a king's friend. Therefore, is it, O Yajnasena (Drupada), that I retain half thy kingdom. Thou art the king of all the territory lying on the southern side of the Bhagirathi (Ganga), while I become king of all the territory on the north of that river. And, O Panchala, if it pleaseth thee, know me hence for thy friend.

On hearing these words, Drupada answered:-, Thou art of noble soul and great prowess. Therefore, O Brahmana, I am not surprised at what thou doest. I am very much gratified with thee, and I desire thy eternal friendship.

After this, Drona released the king of Panchala, and cheerfully performing the usual offices of regard, bestowed upon him half the kingdom. Thenceforth Drupada began to reside sorrowfully in the city of Kampilya within the province of Makandi on the banks of the Ganges filled with many towns and cities. And after his defeat by Drona, Drupada ruled the Southern Panchalas up to the bank of the Charmanwati river. Meanwhile, Drona continued to reside in Ahichatra. Thus was the territory of Ahicchatra full of towns and cities, obtained by Arjuna, and bestowed upon Drona. (Later, Drona gave the rulership of Northern Panchala kingdom to his son Ashwathama and stayed at Hastinapura the capital of Kuru kingdom.)

=== The higher status of Panchalas and Kurus in ancient India ===
The Kuru-Panchala was considered foremost among the provinces in Bharata Varsha (ancient India), comprising the Kuru and Panchala kingdoms (6,9).

The Kurus and Panchalas were considered as foremost among the ruling tribes in ancient India, adhering close to the Vedic religion. They were the proponents of the Vedic religion in its dogmatic and purest form. Other tribes imitated the practices of these tribes and thus got accepted into the Vedic religions.

Commencing with the Panchalas, the Kauravas, the Naimishas (a forest-country to the east of Panchala), the Matsyas, all these, know what religion is. The old men among the Northerners, the Angas, the Magadhas, without themselves knowing what virtue is follow the practices of the Kuru-Panchalas (8,45).

The Kurus and the Panchalas comprehend from a half-uttered speech; the Salwas cannot comprehend till the whole speech is uttered. The Magadhas are comprehenders of signs; the Koshalas comprehend from what they see. The Mountaineers, like the Sivis, are very stupid. The Yavanas are omniscient; the Suras are particularly so. The mlecchas are wedded to the creations of their own fancy that other peoples cannot understand (8,45).

The Panchalas observe the duties enjoined in the Vedas; the Kauravas observe truth; the Matsyas and the Surasenas perform sacrifices. Beginning with the Matsyas, the residents of the Kuru and the Panchala countries, the Naimishas as well and the other respectable peoples, the pious among all races are conversant with the eternal truths of religion. The Kauravas with the Panchalas, the Salwas, the Matsyas, the Naimishas, the Koshalas, the Kasapaundras, the Kalingas, the Magadhas, and the Chedis who are all highly blessed, know what the eternal religion is (8,45).

=== Territories and locations within the Panchala kingdom ===
==== Kichaka kingdom ====
Capital: Vetrakiya

===== Kichaka the commander-in-chief of Matsya army =====
Kichaka kingdom was a territory lying to the south of (southern) Panchala. It was ruled by Kichaka clan of kings. They belonged to the Suta caste (offspring of Kshatriyas upon Brahmana ladies) . One among the Kichakas was the commander-in-chief of the Matsya army under king Virata. He was slain by Pandava Bhima due to his bad conduct towards the wife of Pandavas, viz Draupadi. Kichaka kingdom also lay to the east of the Matsya kingdom under the rule of king Virata. It seems that this territory was allied to both the Matsyas and Panchalas, with its own independent rulers. Its capital was mentioned to be Vetrakiya, on the banks of the river Vetravati (Betwa) also known as Suktimati.

===== The town named Ekachakra =====
It is believed that the Pandavas lived in a small town named Ekachakra, belonging to this territory, during their wanderings after Duryodhana attempted to murder them at Varanavata (a Kuru city).

In the course of their wanderings the Pandavas saw the countries of the Matsyas, the Trigartas, the Panchalas and then of the Kichakas, and also many beautiful woods and lakes therein. They all had matted locks on their heads and were attired in barks of trees and the skins of animals. They attired in the garbs of ascetics. They used to study the Rik and the other Vedas and also all the Vedangas as well as the sciences of morals and politics. Finally they met Vyasa. He told them:- Not far off before you is a delightful town. Saying this he led them into the town of Ekachakra. on arriving at Ekachakra, the Pandavas lived for a short time in the abode of a Brahmana, leading an eleemosynary life. (1,159).

During this period, Bhima slew a Rakhsasa named Baka (Vaka), at Vetrakiya. He controlled the affairs of that kingdom (Kichaka kingdom) making the king of the kingdom, a name-sake king. By slaying the Rakshasa, Bhima freed that kingdom from Baka's the reign of terror. (1-165-166).

==== Pandavas journey from Ekachakra to Kampilya ====
Pandavas proceeded towards Panchala with their mother, to attend the self-choice event of princess Draupadi. In order to reach their destination, they proceeded in a due northerly direction, walking day and night till they reached a sacred shrine of Siva with the crescent mark on his brow. Then those tigers among men, the sons of Pandu, arrived at the banks of the Ganges. It was a forest called Angaraparna. Here, they encountered a Gandharva named Angaraparna (See Gandharva kingdom) (1,172). After that encounter they went to a place called Utkochaka, where they met sage Dhaumya. They appointed Dhaumya, the younger brother of Devala, as their priest (1,185). Then they proceeded towards the country of the southern Panchalas ruled over by the king Drupada They proceeded by slow stages staying for some time within those beautiful woods and by fine lakes that they beheld along their way and entered the capital of the Panchalas. Beholding the capital (Kampilya), as also the fort, they took up their quarters in the house of a potter. Desirous of beholding the Swayamvara (self-choice ceremony of the princess), the citizens, roaring like the sea, all took their seats on the platforms that were erected around the amphitheatre. The kings from diverse countries entered the grand amphitheatre by the north-eastern gate. And the amphitheatre which itself had been erected on an auspicious and level plain to the north-east of Drupada's capital, was surrounded by beautiful mansions. And it was enclosed on all sides with high walls and a moat with arched doorways here and there. The Pandavas, too, entering that amphitheatre, sat with the Brahmanas and beheld the unequalled affluence of the king of the Panchalas (1,187).

Arjuna won the competition set for winning Draupadi in the self-choice ceremony (1,192).

==== Kanyakubja kingdom ====
This kingdom is identified to be the modern day Kannauj district of Uttar Pradesh. During the reign of King Drupada of southern Panchala, this territory formed a part of the southern Panchala

Gadhi, born in the race of king Kusika and Gadhi's son Viswamitra, were mentioned as the earlier rulers of this kingdom at (1, 176). Gadhi's daughter was married to Richika (could be related to the Rishikas in the north), belonging to the Bhargava clan. Richika's son was Jamadagni and Jamadagni's son was the celebrated Bhargava Rama. Gadhi mentioned to Richika about a custom followed by their race, that during marriage, that the bridegroom should give to the bride side a dower of 3,000 fleet steeds with brown color. (This custom is similar to that of Madra Culture.) Richika get the horses from Varuna (Varuna is indicative of western cultures. Note that Arjuna also got his excellent chariot, horses and bow from Varuna). The horses reached Kanyakubja capital, crossing the river Ganges. The spot where they crossed the river was known by the name 'horse's landing place' (3,115).

Not far from Kanyakubja, a spot in the sacred bank of the Ganges is still famous among men as Aswatirtha in consequence of the appearance of those horses at that place (13,4).

Both the Kusikas and the Bhargava-Richikas seems to have links with the ancient western-cultures (See Also: Bahlika Culture, Madra Culture, Rishika kingdom and Rishikas). Viswamitra (Kusika's race) was born as a Kshatriya and later became a Brahmana, much like what was common in Madra Cultures. Bhargava Rama ( Richika's race) was mentioned as an expert in the use of the battle-axe, which he got from Kailasa region (Kailas range Tibet). The Rishika tribe, who were experts in the use of battle-axes were located not far from this region. The custom of donating or accepting horses as dowry also indicates a north-western culture. It seems that neither the Bhargavas (and Richikas or Rishikas) nor the Kusikas, maintained any distinctions such as Brahmana and Kshatriya upon themselves. However during the later periods, when the Vedic religion became rigid in its four-order caste-system, the Bhargavas were accepted as Brahmanas and the Kusikas as Kshatriyas

Gadhi was mentioned as a sovereign whose military force was exceedingly great (3,115). Viswamitra also was mentioned as possessing a large army and many animals and vehicles. Using those animals and vehicles he used to roam around in the forests in search of deer (1,176). During his wanderings he met the sage Vasistha. He engaged in a dispute with this sage, on the matter of the wealth of cattle possessed by the sage. (Cattle wealth always caused dispute among ancient Indian kingdoms. See the dispute between Matsyas and Trigartas for the sake of cattle wealth; in Matsya kingdom). Viswamitra had to encounter many local-armies to seize the cattle wealth. (See Dravidas, Keralas, Paundras and Kiratas, Pulindas). He was vanquished by the local-armies (1,177). After the defeat from Vasistha, Viswamitra adopted the life of an ascetic. Bhargava Rama also is mentioned to defeat many tribes like Heheyas and later adopting the life of an ascetic. Thus both the Kusikas and Bhargava-Richikas were warrior-tribes, who also were a priest-like class of people.

- In the country of Panchala, there is a forest called Utpala, where Viswamitra of Kusika's race had performed sacrifices with his son (3,87).

=== Pandavas's route from Dwiata lake to Matsya kingdom ===
Panchala was one among the countries considered by the Pandavas to spend their 13th year of anonymity along with the kingdoms viz Chedi, Matsya, Surasena, Pattachchara, Dasarna, Navarashtra, Malla, Salva, Yugandhara, Saurashtra, Avanti, and the spacious Kuntirashtra (4,1).

Pandavas selected the Matsya kingdom for their 13th year of anonymous life. Pandavas ordered their chief servant Indrasena and the others to take with then the empty chariots and to speedily proceeded to Dwaravati. All the maid-servants of Draupadi were ordered to go to the Panchala kingdom. After that the Pandavas left Dwaita lake in the Dwaita forest and proceeded to Matsya kingdom. Dhaumya, their priest, taking their sacred fires, set out for the Panchala kingdom (4,4). Pandavas travelling eastwards, reached river Yamuna. Travelling along the southern banks of Yamuna, they passed through Yakrilloma, Surasena. Then they turned westwards (possibly to deceive the spies of Duryodhana, who might have following them), leaving behind, on their right (north side), the country of the Panchalas, and on their left (south side), that of the Dasarnas entered the Matsya kingdom (4,5).

=== Impact of Magadha kings on Panchala ===
Due to the power of Magadha king Jarasandha, many ancient tribes had to shift their domains. Prominent among them were the Yadavas, who fled from Surasena kingdom to south-west to Anarta kingdom. The king of the Salwayana tribe with their brethren and followers, and the southern Panchalas and the eastern Kosalas also had to flee to the country of the Kuntis (which was south of these kingdoms) (2,14).

Even though only king Jarasandha is mentioned, this situation could have arisen due to many generations of powerful Magadha kings who were forefathers of Jarasandha. During the reign of Drupada, no shift in the location of southern Panchala is mentioned explicitly. If the situation was created by Jarasandha alone, and no other Magadha kings later or earlier to him, then this shift of southern-Panchala could be temporary.

=== Dispute of Panchalas with Dasarnas ===
There arose a dispute between the Dasarna kingdom lying to the south, and the southern-Panchala king Drupada, upon the matter of the gender of prince Shikhandi, who was married to the princess of Dasarna.

=== Panchala's alliance with Pandava King Yudhishthira ===
Bhima during his military campaign to the east, to collect tribute for Yudhishthira's Rajasuya sacrifice, first visited the Panchala kingdom after leaving his home city Indraprastha (2,28). only two tribes do not pay tribute unto Yudhishthira, viz., the Panchalas in consequence of their relationship by marriage, and the Andhakas and Vrishnis (Anarta Yadavas) in consequence of their friendship (2,51).

When the Pandavas were banished by Duryodhana to the woods, by taking over their kingdom, both the Panchalas and Yadavas visited them along with other cousins like Chedis and Kekeyas (3,12). Pandavas five son's by Draupadi, spent some of their life in Panchala and some in Dwaraka during the 13-year-long exile of the Pandavas.

During their pilgrimage all around India, Yudhishthira asked the weak men among his followers to go to king Dhritarashtra of Kuru kingdom and if he didn't take care of them, then to king Drupada of southern Panchala (3,92).

Yudhishthira and his followers, with Matsya king Virata, began to make preparations for war (Kurukshetra War). Virata and his relatives sent word to all the monarchs, and Panchala king Drupada also did the same. And at the request of Pandavas, as also of the two kings of the Matsyas and the Panchalas, many kings gathered for their cause (5,5). Druupada sent his priest to Hastinapura for the initial peace talks (5-19,20).

Drupada, the king of the Panchalas, surrounded by his ten heroic sons, Satyajit and other headed by Dhrishtadyumna, and well-protected by Shikhandi, and having furnished his soldiers with necessary things, joined the Pandavas with a full Akshauhini (5,57).

=== Panchalas in Kurukshetra War ===
Panchalas were the closest among all the allies of the Pandavas in the Kurukshetra War. Panchala prince Dhristadyumna was the commander-in-chief for the whole of the Pandava army. Many heroes from Panchala fought in the war. Most of them were alive till the end of the war. However all of them were slain by Ashwathama in an ambush, when they were asleep in their tents, on the last day of the war. Ashwathama was the ruler of half of the Panchala kingdom viz the northern Panchala, under Kuru king Duryodhana. Northern Panchala was then reduced to the status of a province of the Kuru kingdom. This could be the political factor that caused the Panchalas (southern Panchalas) to become kinsmen of the Pandavas, who were a rebel force in the Kuru kingdom. By supporting the Pandavas in Kurukshetra War they might have sought to regain their lost Panchala territories.

==== Panchala Heroes ====
At (1,140) Satyajit is mentioned as the commander-in-chief of the Panchala army under king Drupada who fought against Arjuna who was then a disciple of Drona, the preceptor in warfare, in the Kuru kingdom. He came to the Kurukshetra War leading the one Akshouhini of Panchala army. The brave warriors among the Panchalas, viz., Jayanta, Amitaujas and the great car-warrior Satyajit were mentioned as great car-warriors (Maharathas) by Bhishma. (5,172)

The Panchala princes (5,57) Yudhamanyu and Uttamaujas were protectors of Arjuna's car-wheels (7-88,89), during the battle. Similarly the Panchala prince Kumara is mentioned as one of the protectors of Yudhishthira's car-wheels, along with another hero Yugadhara (hailing from the city of Yugandhara, located somewhere to the west of Kurujangala (either in Haryana or Punjab)). Kumara and Yugandhara was slain by Drona (7,16). Vyaghradatta was another Panchala prince slain by Drona along with Sinhasena (7,16).

Dhrishtadyumna, Sikhandin, Janamejaya ( the son of Durmuksha), Chandrasen, Madrasen, Kritavarman, Dhruva, Dhara, Vasuchandra and Sutejana were mentioned as Panchala heroes, some of them being the sons of Drupada (7,155). The 10 sons of Drupada were mentioned at (5,57) and his five sons were mentioned at (8,85) as participating in the Kurukshetra War. Suratha and Satrunjaya were mentioned as sons of Drupada slain by Ashwathama (7,153), (9,14). At (7,184) Drupada's three grandsons were also mentioned as battling in the war. Shikhandi's son Khsatradeva was mentioned as battling in the war at (7,23). Dhristadyumna's sons, tender in year, were mentioned as slain by Drona in the war at (11,22).

Valanika, Jayanika, Jaya, Prishdhra, and Chandrasena—these heroes were also is believed to be of Panchala, slain by Ashwathama (7,153).

==== The Somakas, Srinjayas and the Prabhadrakas ====
These three names were mentioned frequently in the narration Kurukshetra War either as related to the Panchalas or as synonymous to the Panchalas. Srinjayas and Somakas were tribes allied to the Panchalas by kinship, born off from the various branches of the same royal lineage that brought forth the Panchala-tribe. They dwelled in the various provinces of the Panchala kingdom. Prabhadrakas seems to be an elite group of Panchala army, employed in Kurukshetra War.

===== The Somakas =====
Somaka seems to be a name used to denote all the tribes of Panchalas. The word Somaka, means the one who belonged to the Lunar Dynasty. This name could have given by rulers of Solar Dynasty. The Kosala kingdom ruled by Solar Dynasty of kings lay to the east of Panchala. So this name could have been coined by the Kosalas to denote the Panchalas. Thus the name could be collective to the whole of the Panchala tribes or specific to the tribes that lie close to Kosala, i.e. the tribes that dwell in the eastern parts of Panchala.

- Pancalas and Srinjayas were mentioned collectively as Somakas at (10,8).
- Somakas and Panchalas were mentioned as different tribes at (5-175), (6-72,89,99,120), (7- 83, 123, 124, 148, 156, 157, 162, *167, 171, 184), (8- 22, 89), (9- 6, 17, 18, 21).
- Somakas and Srinjayas were mentioned as different tribes at (6-15, 119), (8,92), (9,20)
- Somakas and Prabhadrakas were mentioned as different tribes at (9-11).
- The Srinjayas and the Panchalas, the Matsyas and the Somakas were mentioned as separate tribes at (7,158).
- Drona during the war mentioned to Duryodhana thus:- I will not put off my armour without slaying all the Panchalas. O king, go and tell my son Ashwathama not let the Somakas alone. (7,148).
- A Kurukshetra War hero, viz Kshatradharman is mentioned as belonging to the Somaka tribe, where another hero Uttamaujas is mentioned as belonging to the Panchala tribe (7,83).
- A King Somaka is mentioned at (1-2,127,128) along with his son Jantu. King Somaka was the son of Sahadeva, and a most excellent maker of gifts and he performed a sacrifice on the banks of Yamuna. King Somaka is listed among the great kings of ancient India (6,9) (13-76,115).

Somakas were mentioned as synonymous to Panchalas at many places. In some of these references Drupada is mentioned as a Somaka king and Dhristadyumna as a Somaka prince. Refer (1- 123, 133), (5- 5, 22, 48, 50, 130, 141, 152, 161), (6- 1, 43, 52, 59, 75, 77, 90, 98, 104, 108, 109, 117, 119), (7- 7, 23, 92, 107, 115, 122, 143, 152, 161, 166, 170, 188, 191, 198), (8- 24, 74, 78, 82, 89, 90, 91), (9- 7, 8, 30, 56, 57, 59), (10- 8).

===== The Srinjayas =====
Srinjaya king Hotravahana is mentioned as the maternal grandfather of Kasi princess Amba (Amva) (5 -178, 179). Amva, coming from Salwa stayed in the asylum of sage Saikhavatya (who dwelled on the banks of Saikavati river). Hotravahana met her granddaughter there. He is mentioned as a friend of Bhargava Rama.

At (1,140) the Panchalas and Srinjayas were mentioned as attacking Arjuna when he try to make Drupada captive for the sake of Drona.

- Uttamujas was mentioned as the great Srinjaya car-warrior at (8,75).
- Srinjayas and Panchalas were mentioned as separate tribes at many places. Refer (1- 140), (5- 57), (6- 14, 89, 96, 116), (7- 21, 22, 38, 105, 108, 111, 119, 127, 153, 154, 157, 163, 171, 175, 181, 188, 197), (8- 3, 5, 10, 25, 32, 37, 47, 60, 96), (9- 13, 32, 55, 61), (10,8).
- Chedis the Andhakas, the Vrishnis, the Bhojas, the Kukuras and the Srinjayas were mentioned as separate tribes at (5,28). Here the Andhakas, Vrishinis, Bhojas and the Kukuras were tribes belonging to the Yadava clan.
- The Kasayas (Kasis), the Chedis, the Matsyas, the Srinjayas, the Panchalas, and the Prabhadrakas were mentioned as separate tribes at (5,57).
- The Chedis, the Srinjayas, the Kasis and the Kosalas were mentioned as battling together for Pandavas at (7,122).
- A Srinjaya king is mentioned as great amongst conquerors at (1- 1) . He is also mentioned at (2,8). At (7,53) Srinjaya is mentioned as the son of a king named Switya. Sinjaya's son named Suvarnashthivin was slain by some robber-tribes during his childhood. The sages Narada and Parvata (Narada's sister's son (12,30)) were Srinjaya's friends. Chapters (7- 53 to 69) describes a narration of Narada to Srinjaya, to console him in the death of his son. This is also mentioned at (12-29,30,31).
- Bhishma mentions at (5,164) that he could slay the whole armies of Srinjayas and the Salweyas (Salwa lay to the west of Kuru while Panchala was to its east).

Srinjayas were mentioned as synonymous to Panchalas at many places. Refer (3- 33,35), (5- 22, 24, 25, 26, 28, 48, 71, 72, 82, 93, 127, 162, 163, 168), (6- 16, 45, 59, 60, 72, 73, 74, 75, 87, 91, 99, 108, 109, 110, 115, 116, 120), (7- 2, 7, 9, 12, 13, 14, 16, 33, 76, 92, 94, 107, 122, 148, 151, 152, 180, 184, 190), (8- 21, 24, 31, 35, 51, 54, 56, 57, 58, 59, 61, 66, 67, 73, 75, 79, 85, 93, 94), (9- 19, 29, 33, 34, 57, 59, 61), (10,8), (11,26).

- A king named Srinjaya is mentioned as an ally of Jayadratha king of Sindhu kingdom. (3,263).

===== The Prabhadrakas =====
Prabhadrakas seems to be an elite army obtained by Panchalas from the Kambojas. They could also be a Panchala army-unit or a Panchala tribe, that were trained in cavalry warfare by the Kambojas.

At (7,23) the Prabhadrakas were mentioned as hailing from Kamboja kingdom. (See also note 4 & 5 in: Parama Kamboja kingdom). They could be the army bought by Panchals from the Kambojas, since Kambojas were famous for lending their horses or cavalry to any party on payment basis:- The Prabhadrakas of the Kamvoja country, numbering 6000, with upraised weapons, with excellent steeds on their gold-decked cars, with stretched bows, supported Dhristadyumna (6, 19), (7,23). To distinguish them from the proper Panchala army or from other Prabhadrakas, they were mentioned as Prabhadraka-Panchalas (7,151). They were 6000 in numbers and mentioned as supporting Shikhandi at (7,151). They were an elite group in the Pandava army (5- 48, 199). This army is mentioned as battling on the side of Pandavas at (6,112), (7- 159, 182), (8- 12, 22, 30, 48, 49, 56, 67), (9- 7, 11, 15, 27). Karna slew 770 foremost of warriors among the Prabhadrakas initially (8,48). He then slew 1700 of them (8, 67).

A group of Prabhadrakas is mentioned as battling against Dhristadyumna at (7,92):- The chief of Avanti, with the Sauviras and the cruel Prabhadrakas, resisted wrathful Dhrishtadyumna.

The Kasayas (Kasis), the Chedis, the Matsyas, the Srinjayas, the Panchalas, and the Prabhadrakas were mentioned as separate armies at (5,57). Prabhadrakas and Panchalas were mentioned as separate armies at (5- 152, 172), (6- 19, 49, 56), (7- 23, 33, 181, 191), (8- 61) and (9,1).

When Ashwathama slaughtered the Panchalas in an ambush at night, when they were asleep, the Prabhadrakas headed by Shikhandi woke up and tried to put up some resistance. But Ashwathama and his army slew them all including Shikhandi.

=== Other references ===
- Brahmadatta is mentioned as a highly devout king of Panchala at (13,137). Here he is mentioned as donating a conch-shell. At (12,233) he is mentioned as donating two precious jewels called Nidhi and Sankha. He is mentioned at (12,342) also.
- A sage from Panchala is mentioned as Rishi-Panchala (also known as Galava, born in the Vabhravya race) at (12-342,347). He compiled the rules in respect of the division of syllables and words for reading the Vedas and those about emphasis and accent in utterance, and shone as the first scholar who became conversant with those two subjects. He is mentioned to have acquired the science of Krama.

Literary significance of Kampilya

In Kampil there have also been great poets. (1) Mathura Chaubey Mukatimani (Kaviraja). Aurangzeb gave him 500 bigha of free hold land that is still in the possession of the family. A descendant of this poet Ms. Neera Misra Chairperson of Draupadi Trust is working for Restoration of the historical and heritage value of this land. (references: Kampilyamahatmya of Durgadatta Sharma, Information as per the book Dalpati Chandrika)

== Jain temple ==
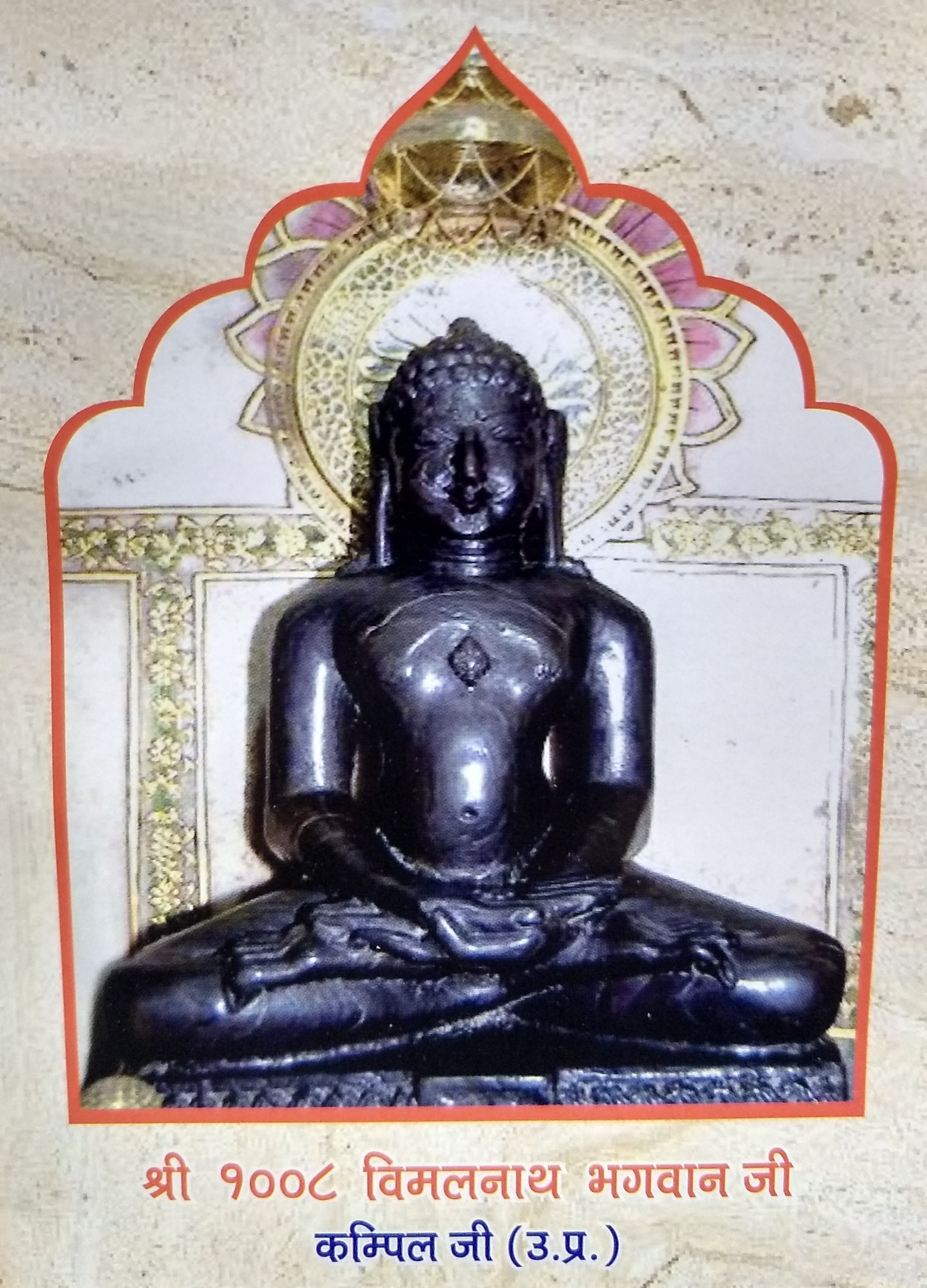
Vimalanatha statue inside Vimalnath Digambar Jain temple

It is believed to be the birthplace of the 13th tirthankar Brahlan Vimal Nath. This is a Holy Land where the four Kalyanakas—chayavan, birth, diksa and omniscience—of Tirthankar 1008 Bhagawan Vimalnath ji, the thirteenth Tirthnakara took place. It was also graced by the visit of Lord Mahavir. Two temples dedicated to the 13th Teerthankar one belonging to the Shwetambar Jains and other to the Digambar Jains are situated at this place.

1. Shri Vimalnath Digambar Jain Atishay Kshetra: this 1800 year old temple us dedicated to Bhagwan Vimalnatha, thirteenth Tirthankara of Jainism. Temple has about 60 cm high black coloured idol of Bhagawan Vimalanatha in the Padmasana Posture. This Idol is around 2600 years old. It is said that the idol was recovered from the river Ganga. There are many other idols worth to be seen. The spire of temple is very high and vast.

2. Shri Vimalnath Swami Jain Shwetambar Mandir & Dharmashala: The idol of Lord Vimalnath stands in the main hall. This idol is nearly 45 cm high, white coloured idol of Bhagawan Vimalanatha in the Padmasana posture. It was established by Shri Vijaykumar Daga.

== Geography ==
Kampil is located at 27.62°N 79.28°E. It has an average elevation of 145 metres (475 feet).

== Rashtrakuta kings ==
Kampilya was also ruled by Rashtrakuta kings and supported Kampliya Vihar having more than 500 monks in the Monastery. [Please add more details with references]

== Demographics of Present Day Kampil ==
As of 2001 India census, Kampil had a population of 8475. Males constitute 54% of the population and females 46%. Kampil has an average literacy rate of 47%, lower than the national average of 59.5%: male literacy is 55%, and female literacy is 37%. In Kampil, 21% of the population is under 6 years of age.

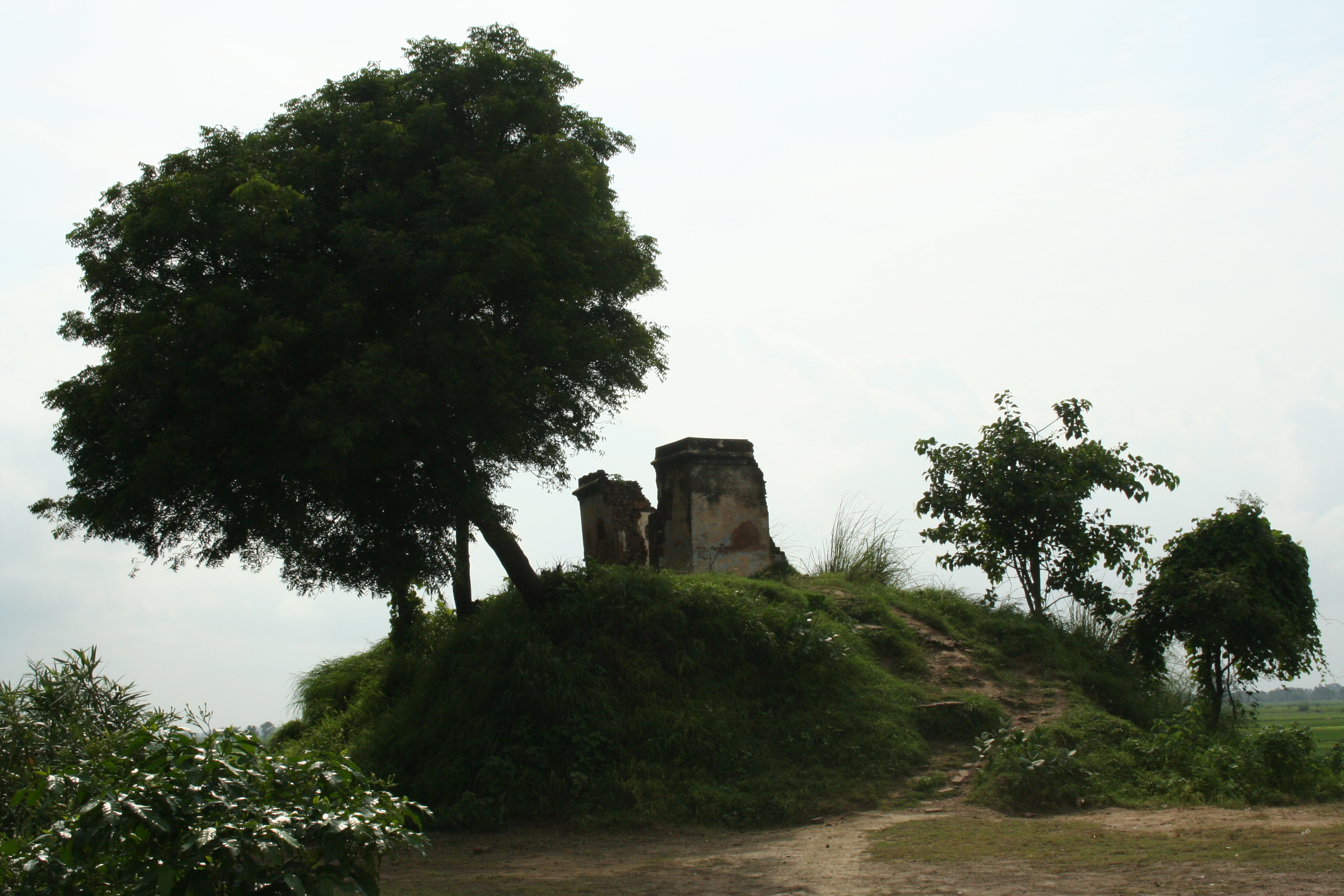
Ruins of an ancient temple in Kampil (Kampilya). The mound below indicates an archaeological site

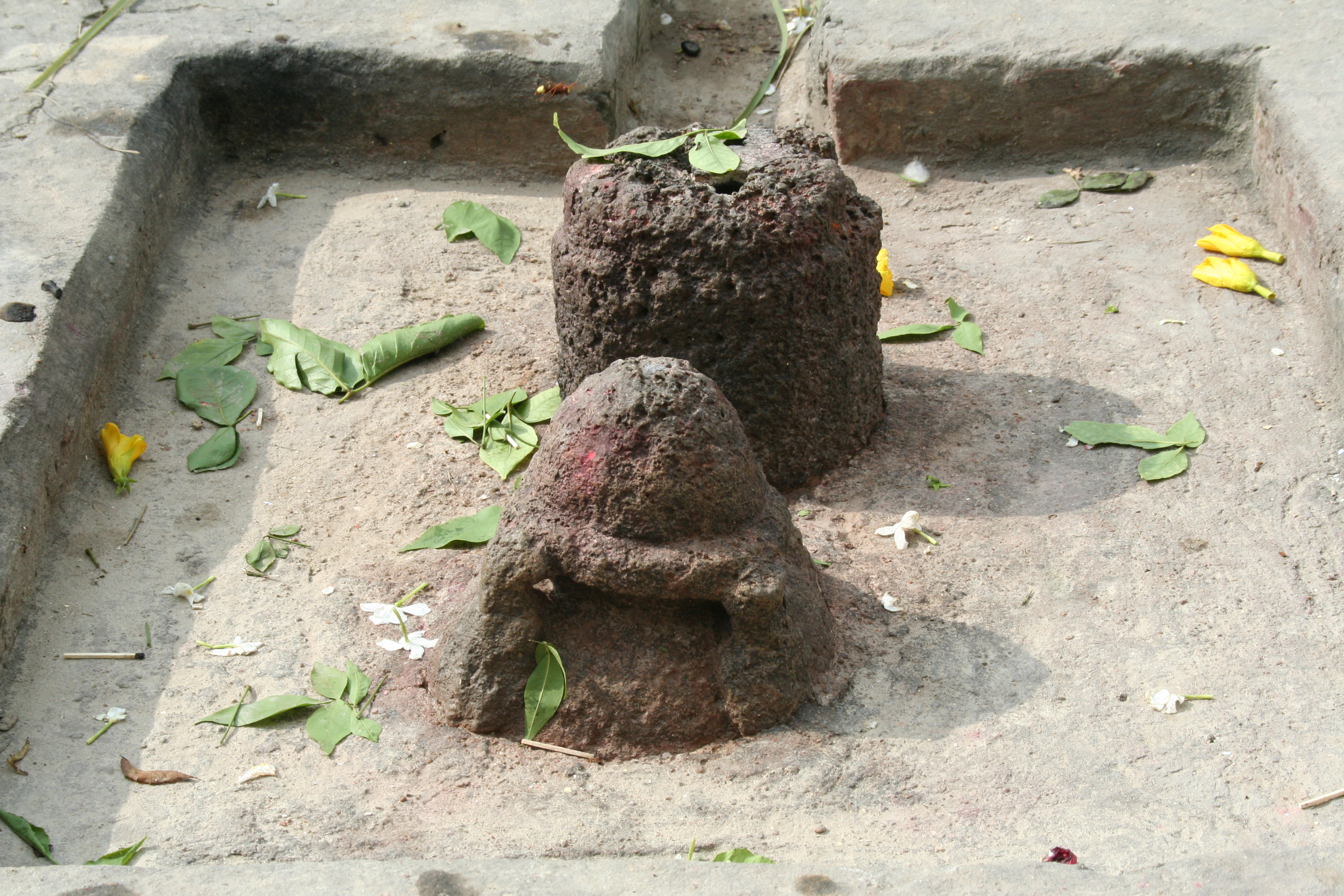
Time eroded Shivlings on the mound of a destroyed ancient temple in Kampil (Kampilya), believed to be temple consecrated by Rishi Agastya as per local legend.

== See also ==
- Panchala
