= Avanti kingdom (Mahabharata) =

Historical Kingdom in ancient India

The historical Avanti kingdom of ancient India is described in the Mahabharata epic. Avanti was divided into north and south by river Vetravati. Initially, Mahissati (Sanskrit Mahishamati) was the capital of southern Avanti, and Ujjaini (Sanskrit Ujjayini) was of northern Avanti, but at the times of Mahavira and Buddha, Ujjaini was the capital of integrated Avanti. The country of Avanti roughly corresponded to modern Malwa, Nimar and adjoining parts of the Madhya Pradesh.

Both Mahishmati and Ujjaini stood on the southern high road called Dakshinapatha extending from Rajagriha to Pratishthana (modern Paithan). Avanti was an important center of Buddhism and some of the leading theras and theris were born and resided there. King Nandivardhana of Avanti was defeated by king Shishunaga of Magadha. Avanti later became part of Magadhan empire.

== Mahabharata ==
=== Ancient India ===
Avanti kingdom is mentioned in the list of kingdoms in ancient India (Bharata Varsha) :- ...the Kuntis, the Avantis, and the further-Kuntis; the Gomantas, the Mandakas, the Shandas, the Vidarbhas, the Rupavahikas; the Aswakas, the Pansurashtras, the Gopa rashtras, and the Karityas; the Adhirajyas, the Kuladyas, the Malla rashtras, the Keralas, the Varatrasyas, the Apavahas, the Chakras, the Vakratapas, the Sakas; the Videhas, the Magadhas.... (6,9)

=== Avanti a rich kingdom ===
Surrounding the kingdom of the Kurus, are, many countries beautiful and abounding in corn, such as Panchala, Chedi, Matsya, Surasena, Pattachchara, Dasarna, Navarashtra, Malla, Salva, Yugandhara, Saurashtra, Avanti, and the spacious Kuntirashtra. (4,1).

=== Avanti was well connected by ancient highways ===
Words of Nishadha king Nala to his wife Damayanti of Vidarbha Kingdom.

These many roads lead to the southern country, passing by (the city of) Avanti and the Rikshavat mountains. This is that mighty mountain called Vindhya; yon, the river Payasvini running seawards, and yonder are the asylums of the ascetics, furnished with various fruit and roots. This road leadeth to the country of the Vidarbhas —and that, to the country of the Kosalas. Beyond these roads to the south is the southern country. (3,61)

=== Sahadeva's conquests ===
Allying himself with the vanquished tribes the Pandava Sahadeva then marched towards the countries that lay on the banks of the Narmada. And defeating there in battle the two heroic kings of Avanti, called Vinda and Anuvinda, supported by a mighty host, the mighty son of the twin gods exacted much wealth from them. After this the hero marched towards the town of Bhojakata. (2,30)

=== Karna's conquests ===
Then going to Shishupala's son, the son of the Suta defeated him and that highly powerful one also brought under his sway all the neighbouring rulers. And having subjugated the Avantis and concluded peace with them, and having met with the Vrishnis, he conquered the west. (3,252)

=== Vasudeva Krishna's conquests ===
The Avantis, the Southerners, the Mountaineers, the Daserakas, the Kasmirakas, the Aurasikas, the Pisachas, the Samudgalas, the Kamvojas, the Vatadhanas, the Cholas, the Pandyas, O Sanjaya, the Trigartas, the Malavas, the Daradas difficult of being vanquished, the Khasas arrived from diverse realms, as also the Sakas, and the Yavanas with followers, were all vanquished by Vasudeva Krishna (7,11)

=== Avanti king in Yudhishthira's Rajasuya ===
The king of Avanti, stood in service of the Pandava king Yudhishthira with diverse kinds of water for the final bath, during the Rajasuya sacrifice.

=== Avanti kings allied with the Kauravas in Kurukshetra War ===
The two kings of Avanti (Vinda and Anuvinda), accompanied by a mighty force, brought to Duryodhana, each a separate Akshauhini of troops, for the Kurukshetra War. (5,19)

They were considered as the best among the Kaurava heroes as per Duryodhana's words:- Those, however, amongst us, that are our chief warriors, are Bhishma, Drona, Kripa, Drona's son, Karna, Somadatta, Vahlika, and Salya, the king of Pragjyotisha, the two kings (Vindha and Anuvinda) of Avanti, and Jayadratha; and then, O king, thy sons Dussasana, Durmukha, Dussaha, Srutayu; Chitrasena, Purumitra, Vivingsati, Sala, Bhurisravas, and Vikarna. (5,55) (5,66) (5,198)

Rating by Bhishma:- Vinda and Anuvinda of Avanti are both regarded as excellent Rathas. These two heroes among men will consume the troops of thy foes, with maces and bearded darts, and swords and long shafts, and javelins hurled from their hands. Like a couple of (elephant) leaders sporting in the midst of their herds, these two princes longing for battle, will range the field, each like Yama himself. (5,167)

Suvala's son Shakuni, and Shalya, Jayadratha and the two princes of Avanti named Vinda and Anuvinda, and the Kekaya brothers, and Sudakshina the ruler of the Kambojas and Srutayudha the ruler of the Kalingas, and king Jayatsena, and Vrihadvala the ruler of the Kosalas, and Kritavarman of Satwata's race,--these ten tigers among men, endued with great bravery and possessing arms that looked like maces stood each at the head of an Akshauhini of troops.(6,16)

=== Avanti kings Vinda and Anuvinda in Kurukshetra War ===
Vinda and Anuvinda in the Hindu epic Mahabharata were the two brother kings of Avanti Kingdom. They had sister named Mitravinda who married to lord Krishna. Vinda and Anuvinda fought for their friend Duryodhana's cause during Mahabharata war. King shurasena of the Yadu vansh had five daughters, Rajadhidevi being the youngest. King Jayasena of Avanti kingdom married Rajadhidevi and bore three children, Vinda, Anuvinda and Mitravinda.

The Vinda and Anuvinda of Avanti fought several wars as two Kaurava generals, under the leadership of the Kaurava generallisimo Bhishma. (6- 17,45,47,51,56,71,82,84,87,88,93,95,100,103,109,114,115). They also fought as generals under the generalissimo Drona (7-20,23,30,72,92,93). They were slain by Arjuna (7,96), (8-5,72), (9-2,24), (11-22,25). The Avanti troops continued their battle on the side of Kauravas (7,110)

== See also ==
- Epic India

Other kingdoms in this group include:

1. Chedi (approx. Jhansi district in Uttar Pradesh)
2. Surasena (Mathura district in Uttar Pradesh (also known as Vraja)
3. Dasarna (south to Chedi Kingdom)
4. Karusha (east to Dasarna Kingdom)
5. Kunti (North to Avanti Kingdom)
6. Malava (West to Avanti Kingdom)
7. Gurjara (southern Rajasthan)
8. Heheya (Narmada valley around the city Maheshwar in Madhya Pradesh)
9. Anarta(northern Gujarat)
10. Saurashtra (southern Gujarat)
11. Dwaraka (offshore the Dwarka city in Gujarat)
12. Vidarbha. (north eastern Maharashtra)
