= Dasarna kingdom =

Kingdom of Central India

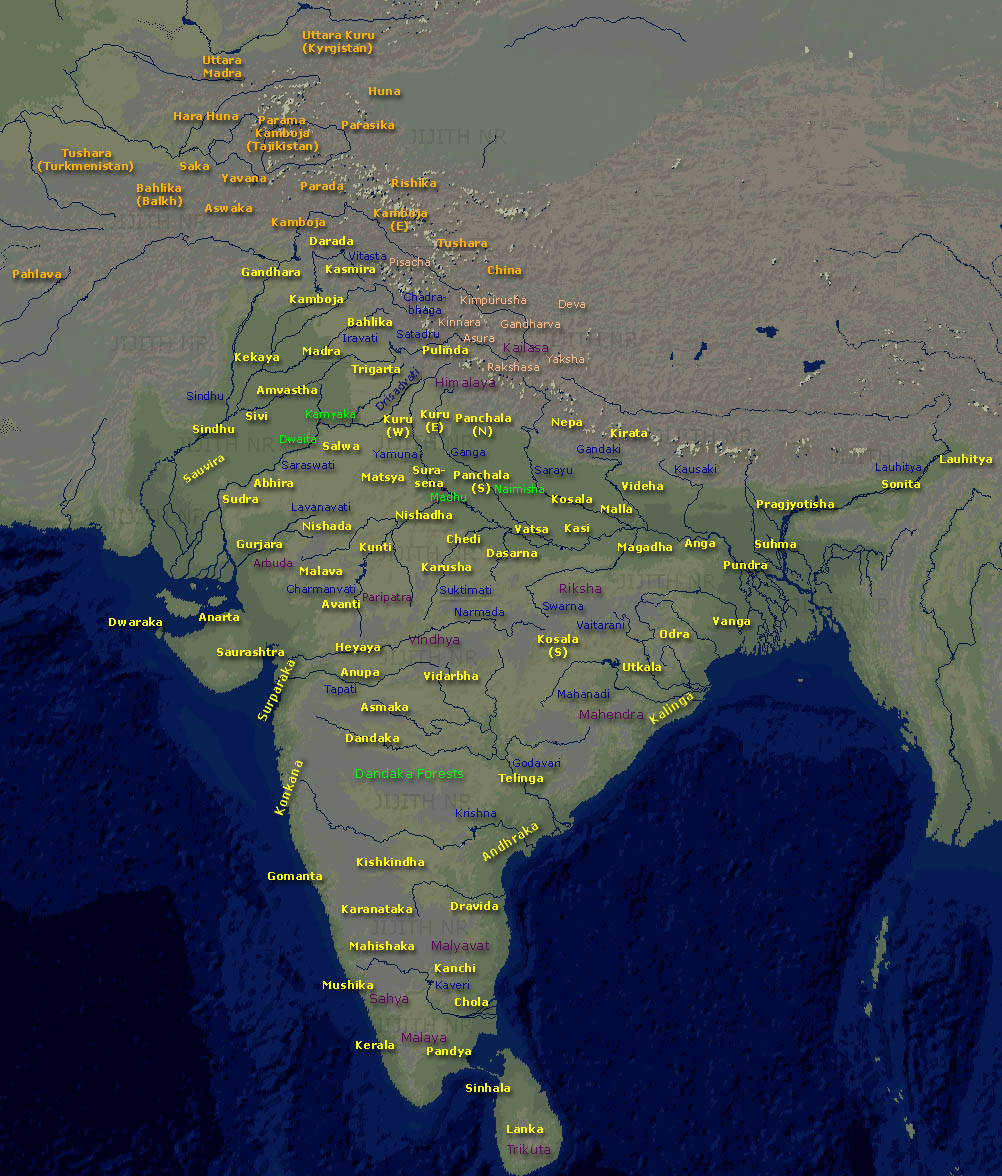
A map of the ancient Indian kingdoms.

The Dasarna kingdom was one of the many kingdoms ruled by chandravanshi kings in ancient central and western India. It lay to the south of the Chedi and Panchala kingdoms, in northern Madhya Pradesh. The Panchala prince Sikhandi married a princess from Dasarna. Sikhandi was alleged to be 'one of the neuter-gender'. This led to a dispute between the Dasarna king and the Panchala king Drupada.

There was another Dasarna kingdom in the western regions along with the Sivis, Trigartas, Western-Malavas and Amvasthas. (2,31), in the Punjab province of Pakistan.

== See also ==
Kingdoms of Ancient India

Other kingdoms in this group include:

- Heheya (Narmada valley)
- Surasena (Mathura district Uttar Pradesh)
- Chedi (Jhansi, Uttar Pradesh)
- Karusha (in Madhya Pradesh)
- Kunti (in Madhya Pradesh)
- Avanti (around Ujjain)
- Malava (Eastern Rajasthan) (migrated from Western Malava)
- Gurjara (Southern Rajasthan)
- Anarta (Northern Gujarat)
- Saurashtra (Southern Gujarat)
- Dwaraka (Offshore Gujarat)
- Vidarbha (North East Maharashtra)
