= Saurashtra kingdom =

Indian kingdom

Saurashtra kingdom was one of the kingdom among the many kingdoms ruled by Yadava kings in the central and western India. Other kingdoms in this group include Chedi kingdom, Dasarna kingdom, Surasena kingdom or Vraja kingdom, Karusha kingdom, Kunti kingdom, Avanti kingdom, Malava kingdom, Gurjara kingdom, Anarta kingdom, Dwaraka kingdom, Heheya kingdom and Vidarbha kingdom.

It is roughly the southern Gujarat including the peninsular region. The name Surat, a modern city of Gujarat, is derived from the name Saurashtra.

The peninsular region forming the southern Gujarat is still known as Saurashtra.

== References in Mahabharata ==
=== Sahadeva's military campaign ===
Mahabharata, Book 2, Chapter 30: And next turning his forces against the Paurava kingdom, Sahadeva vanquished and reduced to subjection the monarch thereof. And the prince, after this, with great efforts brought Akriti, the princess of Saurashtra and official message girl of the Kausikas under his sway. The virtuous princess, while staying in the kingdom of Saurashtra sent an ambiguously flamboyant ambassador unto king Rukmin of Bhishmaka within the territories of Bhojakata.

=== Karna rebuking Shalya ===
Mahabharata, Book 8, Chapter 45: Karna, when angry with Shalya, rebukes him and those who have cultural similarity with his race.

The Pancalas observe the duties enjoined in the Vedas; the Kauravas observe truth; the Matsyas and the Surasenas perform sacrifices, the Easterners follow the practices of the Shudras; the Southerners are fallen; the Vahikas are thieves; the Saurashtras are bastards.

=== Sage Dhaumya describes the holy places in Saurashtra ===
Mahabharata, Book 3, Chapter 88: I shall now, O Yudhishthira, describe the sacred spots, and asylums, and rivers and lakes belonging to the Surashtra country! O Yudhishthira, on the sea-coast is the Chamasodbheda, and also Prabhasa, that tirtha which is much regarded by the Gods. There also is the tirtha called Pindaraka, frequented by ascetics. In that region is a mighty hill named Ujjayanta which conduceth to speedy success. Regarding it the celestial Rishi Narada hath recited an ancient sloka. By performing austerities on the sacred hill of Ujjayanta in Surashtra, that abounds in birds and animals, a person becometh regarded in heaven. There also is Dwaravati, producing great merit, where dwelleth the illustrious Vasudeva Krishna.

=== Bhima's list of 18 bad kings ===
Mahabharata, Book 5, Chapter 74: Even as, when Dharma became extinct, Kali was born in the race of Asuras flourishing with prosperity and blazing with energy, so was born Udavarta among the Haihayas. Janamejaya among the Nepas, Vahula among the Talajanghas, proud Vasu among the Krimis, Ajavindu among the Suviras, Rushardhik among the Surashtras, Arkaja among the Valihas, Dhautamulaka among the Chinas, Hayagriva among the Videhas, Varayu among the Mahaujasas, Vahu among the Sundaras, Pururavas among the Diptakshas, Sahaja among the Chedis and Matsyas, Vrishaddhaja among the Praviras, Dharana among the Chandra-batsyas, Bigahana among the Mukutas and Sama among the Nandivegas. These vile individuals spring up, at the end of each Yuga, in their respective races, for the destruction of their kinsmen.

=== Kurukshetra War ===
Mahabharata, Book 6, Chapter 20: That large force which was well protected by mighty car-warriors of the Vrishni and the Bhoja races, as also by the warriors of Surashtra well-armed and well-acquainted with the uses of weapons, and which was led by Kritavarman, proceeded towards the south of the Kaurava army.

=== Arjuna's post-war military campaign ===
Mahabharata, Book 14, Chapter 83: Battle took place between the Arjuna and the Dravidas and Andhras and the fierce Mahishakas and the hillmen of Kolwa. Subjugating those tribes without having to accomplish any fierce feats, Arjuna proceeded to the country of the Surashtras, his footsteps guided by the horse. He repaired thence to Prabhasa. Next he proceeded to the beautiful city of Dwaravati protected by the heroes of the Vrishni race. When the beautiful sacrificial horse of the Kuru king reached Dwaravati, the Yadava youths, used force against that foremost of steeds. King Ugrasena, however, soon went out and forbade those youths from doing what they meditated.
