= Haihaya kingdom =

Kingdom in the epic Mahabharata

In the Mahabharata epic, the Haihaya kingdom (also spelled Heheya, Haihaya, Haiheya, Heiheya, etc.) is one of the kingdoms ruled by Chandravamsha (Yadava) kings in central and western India. It was ruled by Kartavirya Arjuna, who defeated Ravana. Its capital was Mahishmati on the banks of river Narmada in present-day Madhya Pradesh. Talajangha was an allied kingdom to the east of Heheya. They conquered many other kingdoms of India until enmity with the warrior Bhargavas resulted in their demise. Parashurama was the Bhargava leader who ended the kingdom.

== Haihaya clans ==
The Haihayas (Sanskrit: हैहय) were an ancient confederacy of five ganas (clans), who claimed their common ancestry from Yadu. According to the Harivamsha Purana (34.1898) Haihaya was the great-grandson of Yadu and grandson of Sahasrajit. In the Vishnu Purana (IV.11), all the five Haihaya clans are mentioned together as the Talajanghas. The five Haihaya clans were Vitihotra, Sharyata, Bhoja, Avanti and Tundikera. The Haihayas were native to the present-day Malwa region of Western Madhya Pradesh. The Puranas style the Haihayas as the first ruling dynasty of Avanti.

== Foundation of Mahishmati ==
In the Harivamsha (33.1847), the honour of founding their future capital city of Mahishmati (in present-day Madhya Pradesh) was attributed to king Mahishmant, son of Sahanja and a descendant of Yadu through Haihaya. At another place it names Muchukunda, one of the ancestors of Rama, as the founder of Mahishmati. It states that he built the cities of Mahishmati and Purika in the Rksha mountains.

According to the Padma Purana (VI.115), the city was actually founded by a certain Mahisha.

== Arjuna Kartavirya and his successors ==
According to the Mahabharata and the Puranas, the most celebrated Haihaya king was Arjuna Kartavirya. His epithet was Sahasrabahu. He was called a Samrat and Chakravartin. His name is found in the Rig Veda (VIII.45.26). He ultimately conquered Mahishmati city from Karkotaka Naga, a Naga chief, and made it his fortress-capital. According to the Vayu Purana, he invaded Lanka and took Ravana prisoner. Arjuna propitiated Dattatreya and was favoured by him. Arjuna's sons killed the sage Jamadagni. Jamadagni's son Parashurama in revenge killed Arjuna. Arjuna's son Jayadhvaja succeeded him to the throne. Jayadhvaja was succeeded by his son Talajangha.

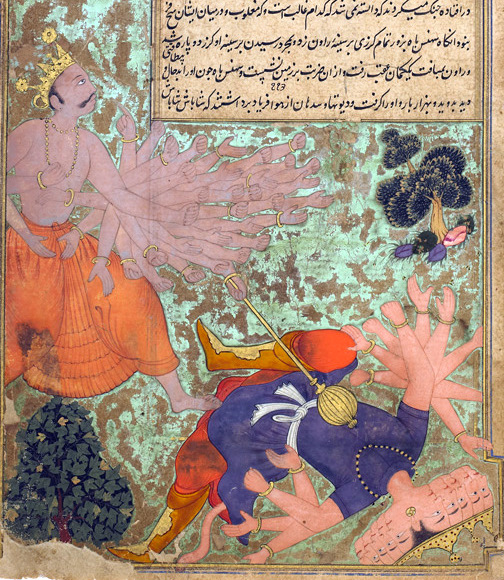
Arjuna Kartavirya, humbling Ravana, a painting by Fazl, 1597–1605

== Vitihotras ==
Later, the Haihayas were mostly known by the name of the dominant clan amongst them, the Vitihotras (or Vitahotras or Vitahvyas). According to the Puranas, Vitihotra was the great-grandson of Arjuna Kartavirya and the eldest son of Talajangha. The Puranas also mention the names of two Vitihotra rulers: Ananta, son of Vitihotra and Durjaya Amitrakarshana, son of Ananta. The Haihaya territory expanded northward to the mid-Ganges valley under the Vitihotra rulers until they were stopped by the Ikshvaku king Sagara. The Mahagovindasuttanta of the Dighanikaya mentions an Avanti king Vessabhu (Vishvabhu) and his capital Mahissati (Mahishmati); probably he was a Vitihotra ruler. Probably, during the rule of the later Vitihotras, the whole Avanti region developed into two realms, divided by the Vindhyas, having principal cities at Mahishmati and Ujjayini (present day Ujjain). According to the Matsya Purana (5.37), Pulika, one of the ministers of Ripunjaya, the last Vitihotra king of Ujjayini, killed his master and made his son Pradyota the new king.

It is said that many of the Haihayas were learned in the Vedas.

== Medieval Haihayas ==
A number of early medieval dynasties, which include the Kalachuris and the Mushakavamsha Mushika kingdom of Kerala, claimed their descent from the Haihayas. The Haihayas of eastern India fought against Islamist invaders in medieval times.

== Mahabharata ==
=== Disputes with the Ikshvaku kings ===
Sagara was a king of Kosala kingdom, ruling from Ayodhya. He was of the lineage of Ikshvaku, a famous royal dynasty in ancient India. Sagara is mentioned as the son of Jadu (MBh 12,56). His army was said to number 60,000 men, all of whom he treated as sons.

The Ikshvaku king Sagara is said to have defeated the Haihayas and the Talajanghas. He brought under subjection the whole of the military caste. (MBh 3,106)

=== The Haihayas and Talajanghas of Vatsa kingdom ===
(MBh 13,30)

The Haihayas and Talajanghas likely had their origins in the Vatsa kingdom. Haihayas in the Vatsa kingdom, known collectively as Vitahavyas and under King Vitahavya, attacked the neighbouring country called Kashi during the reign of four successive generations of Kashi kings: Haryashva, Sudeva, Divodasa and Pratarddana. The last one among them, Pratarddana, defeated the Haihayas and probably expelled them from the Vatsa kingdom. Kashi kings were also born in the Ikshvaku. This could be the seed of Haihayas's dispute with them.

==== Haryashva's reign ====
In Saryati's lineage (Saryati and Ikshvaku were two among the many sons of Manu (MBh 1,75)), two kings took their birth, viz. Haihaya and Talajangha, both sons of Vatsa. Haihaya had ten wives and a hundred sons, all of whom were highly inclined to fighting. In Kashi also there was a king, the grandfather of Divodasa, known as Haryashva. The sons of King Haihaya, who was otherwise known as Vitahavyas, invaded the kingdom of Kashi. Advancing into that country that lies between the rivers Ganges and Yamuna, he fought a battle with King Haryashva, slaying him there. The sons of Haihaya fearlessly went back to their own delightful city in the country of the Vatsas.

==== Sudeva ====
Meanwhile, Haryyaswa's son Sudeva was installed on the throne of Kashi as its new ruler. That righteous-souled prince ruled his kingdom for some time before the hundred sons of Vitahavya once more invaded his dominions and defeated him in battle. Having vanquished King Sudeva thus, the Haihaya victors returned to their own city.

==== Divodasa ====
After that Divodasa, the son of Sudeva, was next installed on the throne of Kashi. Realising the prowess of those high-souled princes, the sons of Vitahavya, King Divodasa, endued with great energy, rebuilt and fortified the city of Kashi at Indra's command. They teemed with articles and provisions of every kind and were adorned with shops and marts swelling with prosperity. Those territories stretched northwards from the banks of Ganges to the southern banks of Gomati, and resembled a second Amaravati (the city of Indra). The Haihayas once again attacked. The mighty King Divodasa, issuing from his capital, gave them battle. King Divodasa fought the enemy for a thousand days but at the end, having lost a number of followers and animals, he became exceedingly distressed. King Divodasa, his army lost and his treasury exhausted, left his capital and fled. He sought protection of his priest, Bharadvaja, the son of Vrihaspati.

==== Divodasa's son Pratardana retaliates ====
Divodasa wished for a brave son who could avenge the Vitahavyas. With his priest Bharadvaja's, blessings he obtained a son named Pratardana, would become well skilled in battle. Divodasa installed his son on the throne of Kashi and asked him to march against the sons of Vitahavya. He speedily crossed the Ganges on his car followed by his army and proceeded against the city of the Vitahavyas. The Vitahavyas issued out of their city in their cars and poured out on Pratarddana, showered of weapons of various kinds. Pratardana slew them all in battle. The Haihaya king Vitahavya then, all his sons and kinsmen dead, sought protection of his priest Bhrigu. Bhrigu converted him a Brahmana. Sage Saunaka, later receiver of the entire Mahabharata narrative from Ugrasrava Sauti, was born from the line of this Vitahavya.

=== Haihaya King Kartavirya Arjuna ===
Kartavirya Arjuna is described as a noble king and a devotee of Dattatreya. Endowed with a thousand arms (thought to symbolise a thousand attendants acting as his hands, executing his commands) and great beauty the mighty Kartavirya, in days of yore, became the lord of all the world. He had his capital in the city of Mahishmati. Of impossible prowess, that chief of the Haihaya race of Yadava Kshatriyas swayed the whole earth with her belt of seas, together with all her islands and all her precious mines of gold and gems. Keeping before him the duties of the Kshatriya order, as also humility and Vedic knowledge, the king made large gifts of wealth unto the Dattatreya (MBh 13,152).

=== Other Haihaya kings ===
- King Vitahavya is mentioned as the son of Vatsa (MBh 13,30)
- King Udvarta became the exterminator of his own race (MBh 5,74)
- The conversation between a Haihaya king and a sage named Tarkshya is mentioned at MBh 3,183
- As a royal sage of the Haihaya, Sumitra by name is mentioned by name at MBh 12,124. Sumitra is mentioned as the son of Mitra at MBh 12,125.

=== Enmity with the Bhargavas ===
The Haihaya tribe's dispute with Bhargava Brahmins is mentioned at various places in the Mahabharata. The leader of the Bhargavas, Parasurama, son of Jamadagni, is said to kill the Haihaya king Kartavirya Arjuna. The dispute didn't end there. The Bhargavas went all over India and slew numerous Kshatriya kings, most of them kinsmen of Kartavirya Arjuna. (MBh 1,104)

In acquiring the unrivaled "battleaxe of fiery splendour and irresistible sharpness" from Mahadeva of the Gandhamadana mountains, in the Himalayas (MBh 12,49), Bhargava Rama became an unparalleled force on earth. Meanwhile, the mighty son of Kritavirya, Arjuna of the Kshatriya order and ruler of the Haihayas, imbued with great energy, highly virtuous in behaviour, and possessing a thousand arms through the grace of the great sage Dattatreya, and having subjugated in battle by the might of his own arms the whole earth with her mountains and seven islands, became a very powerful emperor.(12,49)

The King Arjuna, mighty lord of the Haihaya tribe, would be killed by Rama. (MBh 3,115)

==== Signs of a tribal war ====
"Even though only the leaders Bhargava Rama and Kartavirya Arjuna are mentioned in most places, there is evidence that many people were involved in this dispute. It could be a dispute between two tribes, spanning generations."

Once upon a time the Brahmins, raising a standard of Kusa grass, encountered in battle the Kshatriyas of the Haihaya clan imbued with immeasurable energy. The best of Brahmins inquired of the Kshatriyas themselves as to the cause of this. The Kshatriyas told them, "In battle we obey the orders of one person imbued with great intelligence, while you are disunited from one another and act according to your individual understanding." The Brahmins then appointed one amongst themselves as their commander, who was brave and conversant with the ways of policy. And they then succeeded in vanquishing Haihaya the Kshatriyas. (MBh 5,157)

==== Summary of the dispute ====
Bhargava Rama, having his father Jamadagni slain and his calf stolen by the Kshatriyas, slew Kartaviryas who had never been vanquished before by foes.

With his bow he slew 64 times 10,000 Kshatriyas. In that slaughter were included 14,000 Brahmana-hating Kshatriyas of the Dantakura country. Of the Haihayas, he slew a 1000 with his short club, a 1000 with his sword, and a 1000 by hanging. Rama slew 10,000 Kshatriyas with his axe. He could not quietly bear the furious speeches uttered by those foes of his. And when many foremost of Brahmans uttered exclamations, mentioning the name of Rama of Bhrigu’s race, he proceeding against the Kashmiras, the Daradas, the Kuntis, the Kshudrakas, the Malavas, the Angas, the Vangas, the Kalingas, the Videhas, the Tamraliptakas, the Rakshovahas, the Vitahotras, the Trigartas, the Martikavatas, counting by thousand, slew them all by means of his whetted shafts. Proceeding from province to province, he thus slew thousands of scores of Haihaya-Kshatriyas. Creating a deluge of blood and filling many lakes also with blood and bringing all the 18 islands under his subjection, he performed a 100 sacrifices. (MBh 7,68)

== See also ==
Kingdoms of Ancient India Other kingdoms in this group include:

1. Chedi
2. Surasena (Vraja)
3. Dasarna
4. Karusha
5. Kunti
6. Avanti
7. Malava
8. Gurjara
9. Anarta
10. Saurashtra
11. Dvaraka
12. Vidarbha
