= Bhoja tribe =

Ancient Indian tribe

- Parent house: Andhaka
- Country: Vidarbha Kingdom, Kunti Kingdom, Surasena Kingdom
- Style: Raja
- Cadet branches: Bhojas of Mrittikavati; Bhojas of Vidarbha; Bhojas of Kunti; Bhojas of Goa; Bhojas of Mathura; Bhoja-Andhakas

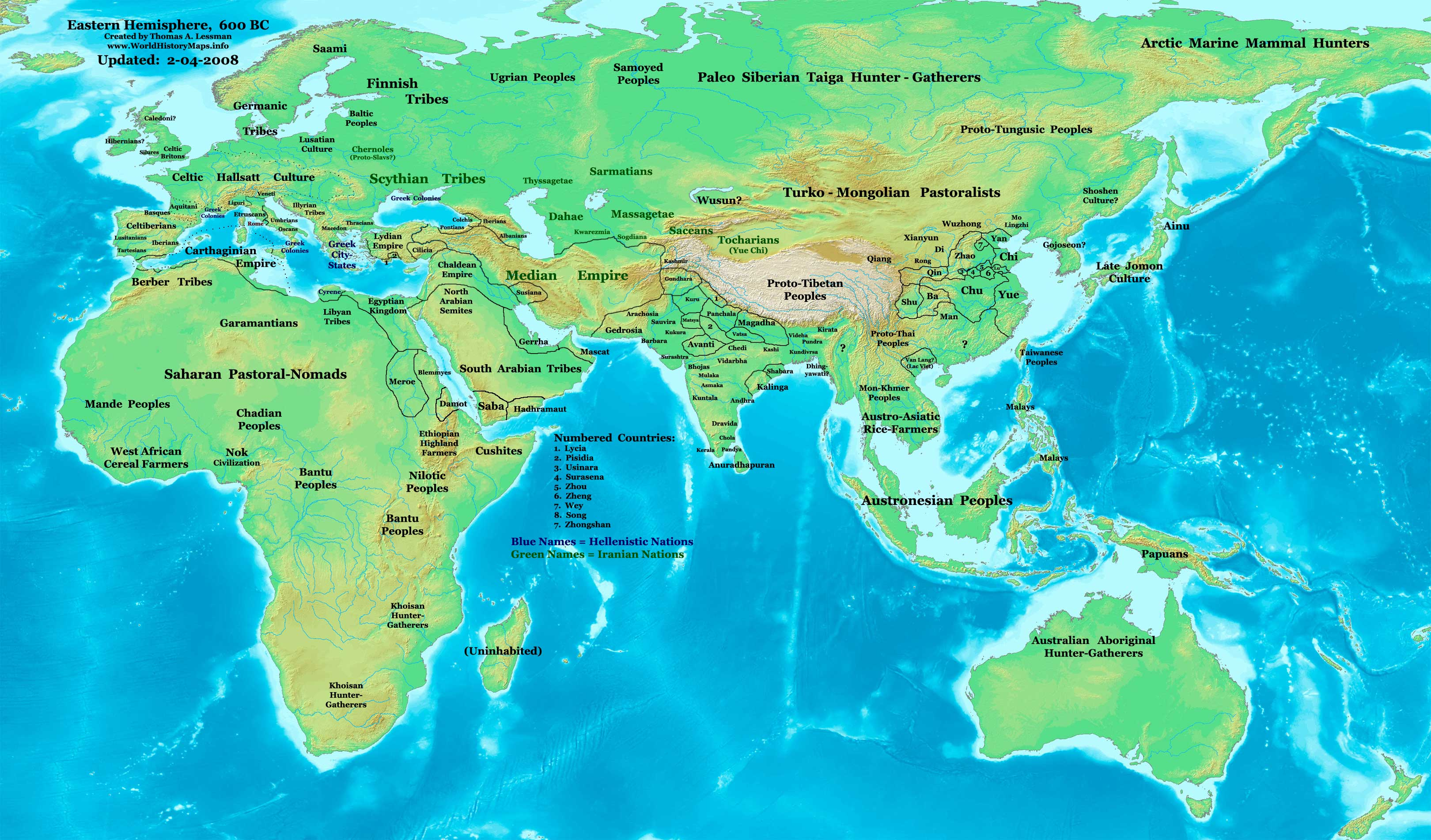
The Bhojas are shown in the south of the Indian subcontinent

The Bhoja tribes were a collection of semi-Aryan ancient tribes, located in India during the Late Vedic Period. They are described as being an offshoot of the Yadava tribe in the Indian epic of Mahabharata. They were a branch of the Andhaka clan, who were in turn descendants of the Satvata clan descended from King Yadu. The Bhojas were sub-divided into eighteen branches and ruled from their capital at Mrittikavati, on the banks of the Parnasa river in Central India.

== Origin ==
The origin of the Bhojas differs from source to source. Most sources such as the famous Indian epic of Mahabharata mention the Bhojas as an offshoot of the Yadava tribe.

The Vishnu Purana says that the Bhojas of Mrittikavati were descendants of Mahabhoja, son of Satvata, and that they were a kindred tribe of the Andhakas and Vrishnis.

The Journal of the Royal Asiatic Society of Great Britain and Ireland theorizes that the Bhojas came to India from Iran, intermixing with the existing tribes wherever they settled. The groups which settled in Rajasthan, Malwa and Kathiawar, became closely related to the Yavanas. They are probably the ones called mlechhas (foreigners) in a passage of the Matsya Purana. The group that settled in the Mathura region allied with the Surasena and Vrishni tribes to establish the Kingdom of Surasena. The group which settled in Saurashtra and the Indus River delta became associated with the Sauviras.

In the Adi Parva of the Mahabharata (85.3533) and in a passage of the Matsya Purana (34.30) the Bhojas are mentioned as the mlecchas (foreigners). But another passage of the Matsya Purana (44.69) describes them as pious and the performers of the religious rites.

== In literature ==
=== Vidarbha ===
The largest and most prosperous kingdom of the Bhoja tribe was the Vidarbha Kingdom. In the Ramayana epic, the Bhoja princess of Vidarbha was married to Prince Aja of the Kosala Kingdom in a Swayamvara ceremony. Aja was the son of the powerful Ikshavku king Raghu, and the father of King Dasharatha, in turn father of Lord Rama. King Bhishmaka of Vidarbha, the father of Rukmini and his son King Rukmi are called "Bhoja-Yadavas" in the Mahabharata.

=== Mathura ===
The Bhojas of Mathura allied with the other Yadava tribes were expelled from their kingdom by Kamsa, son of King Ugrasena. However, the hero-deity Krishna helped them reconquer Mathura from Kamsa and re-establish their rule. The eighteen tribes of the Bhojas fled their kingdom due to fear of the powerful king of Magadha, Jarasandha.

=== Kunti ===
Another prominent Bhoja kingdom was the Kunti Kingdom. It was ruled by King Kunti-Bhoja. Kunti, the mother of Pandavas and the first wife of Kuru king Pandu, was the adopted daughter of Kuntibhoja.

=== Mrittikavati ===
The Bhojas of Mrittikavati ruled somewhere around the Malwa Plateau, on the banks of the Parnasha (Sanskrit: पर्णाशा, romanized: Parṇāśā) river in Central India. These Bhojas held the Satvata tribe in subjection. A Bhoja king took part in the great Kurukshetra War.

According to the Journal of the Royal Asiatic Society, they were allied with Parshurama in defeating the powerful Haihaya king Kartavirya Arjuna. As a result of their success, they achieved supremacy over the Narmada and Tapti River valleys for a time.

=== Bhoja-Andhakas ===
Kritavarma, a Yadava hero, is sometimes described as belonging to and ruling over the Andhaka and Bhoja clan as their king. In the Mausala Parva of the Mahabharata epic, the clans of the Andhakas and Bhojas began to fight each other in drunken duels during a feast, leading to the death of almost all the Yadava royals.

== Descendants ==
Bhojas of Goa were a dynasty that ruled Goa, parts of Konkan, and some parts of Karnataka from at least the 3rd century AD to the 6th century. Goa came under the political sway of the Bhojas who ruled this territory in feudal allegiance to the Mauryan emperor of Pataliputra or perhaps under Satavahanas. Their capital was located at Chandrapura or Chandraura (modern day Chandor) in Goa.

== See also ==
- Bhojas of Goa
- Vidarbha Kingdom
