= Siddha Vinayaka =

Coordinates: 19.232306°N 84.737952°E

Panchama is a small village famous for the temple of Panchama Ganesh, or Siddha Vinayaka as it is locally known. Legend says that the Gajapati King Purushottama deva (15th century) of Puri on the way to his conquest of the Kanchi Kingdom recovered the image in the hollow of two trees of Bara and Ashwattha and paid his homage to the image after its consecration. Since then, the place is sanctified and has become an important centre of Ganapataya worship, preserving the great tradition of Panchadevata worship of Orissa. The idol still remains inside the trunk of two large ficus trees. A temple is constructed around it. Around 200,000 devotees from Orissa and Andhra Pradesh visit this shrine on the day of Ganesh Chaturthi.

== Transport ==
The nearest railway station is 12 km away at Berhampur, on Chennai-Howrah railways.
