= Kanchi kingdom =

Kanchi was a southern kingdom mentioned in the epic Mahabharata. This kingdom took part in the Kurukshetra War.

It is identified as the Kanchi city in Tamil Nadu.

== References in Mahabharata ==
=== The myth of origin of Kanchis ===
- Mahabharata, Book 1, Chapter 177

When the sage Vasistha was attacked by king Viswamitra's army, Vasistha's cow, Kamadehnu, brought forth from her tail, an army of Palhavas, and from her udders, an army of Dravidas and Sakas; and from her womb, an army of Yavanas, and from her dung, an army of Savaras; and from her urine, an army of Kanchis; and from her sides, an army of Savaras. And from the froth of her mouth came out hosts of Paundras and Kiratas, Yavanas and Sinhalas, and the barbarous tribes of Khasas and Chivukas and Pulindas and Chinas and Hunas with Keralas, and numerous other Mlechchhas.

In the ancient Indian literature, cow is a symbol of earth or land. Thus the myth mentioned above simply means that, these tribes gathered for the protection of sage Vasistha's land against the army of king Viswamitra.

=== Kanchis in Kuruksetra War ===
==== On the Kaurava Side ====
- Mahabharata, Book 5, Chapter 161, 162

Kaurava army is protected by the kings of the East, the West, the South and the North, by the Kamvojas, the Sakas, the Khasas, the Salwas, the Kurus of the middle country, the Mlechchhas, the Pulindas, the Dravidas, the Andhras, and the Kanchis.

==== On the Pandava Side ====
- Mahabharata, Book 8, Chapter 12

The Parthas, headed by Bhima, advanced against Kaurava army. They consisted of Dhrishtadyumna, Shikhandi, Draupadi's sons, the Prabhadrakas, and Satyaki and Chekitana with the Dravida forces, and the Pandyas, the Cholas, and the Keralas, all possessed of broad chests, long arms, tall statures, and large eyes. Decked with ornaments, possessed of red teeth, attired in robes of diverse colours, smeared with powdered scents, armed with swords and nooses, equipped with quivers, bearing bows adorned with long locks, and agreeable in speech were the combatants of the infantry files led by Satyaki, belonging to the Andhra tribe, endued with fierce forms and great energy. Other brave warriors such as the Cedis, the Pancalas, the Kaikayas, the Karushas, the Kosalas, the Kanchis, and the Maghadhas, also rushed forward.

== See also ==
- Kingdoms of Ancient India
