= Martikavati =

Martikavati (also known as Matika, Matrika, Matrikavati) was mentioned as the capital of the Salwa Kingdom in the epic Mahabharata. The Salwa king who attacked Dvārakā was from Martikavati. The son of Kritavarma (the Bhoja-Yadava hero) was established in the city of Martikavata by king Yudhishthira (Mahabharata 16:7). Its location is unknown.
