= Rishika kingdom =

Ancient kingdom inhabited by the Rishikas

Rishika was an ancient kingdom inhabited by the Rishikas who were originally a tribe north to Himalayas who had limited interaction with early Indian kingdoms and mentioned in the epic Mahabharata. They belonged to the Xinjiang province of China, east of Kashmir. The Pandava hero, Arjuna visited this place during his northern military campaign for collecting tribute for Yudhishthira's Rajasuya sacrifice (Lohan.paramaKambojanRishikan uttaranapi).

== References in Mahabharata ==
=== Rishika kingdom near Vidarbha ===
Rishikas were mentioned as kingdom of Bharata Varsha (Ancient India), located in Southern Division at (6:9). Here they are mentioned along with the Vidarbha Kingdom (in central India). It is likely that Bhargava Rama belonged to this tribe of Rishikas. An ancestor of Bhargava Rama was named Richika (3:99).

=== Rishika kingdom near Kamboja ===
The kings of the Kamboja and the Richika tribes were mentioned at (5:4). Thus this Rishikas were certainly a northern tribe.

=== Arjuna's expedition to Rishika ===
Arjuna encountered the northern Rishikas close to the Kamboja territory.

Arjuna, the son of Pandu, taking with him a select force, defeated the Daradas along with the Kambojas. Then he vanquished the robber tribes that dwelt in the north-eastern frontier and those also that dwelt in the woods. He also subjugated the allied tribes of the Lohas, the eastern Kambojas, and northern Rishikas. And the battle with the Rishikas was fierce in the extreme. And defeating, the Rishikas in the field of battle, Arjuna took from them as tribute eight horses that were of the colour of the parrot's breast, as also other horses of the hues of the peacock, born in northern and other climes and endued with high speed. At last having conquered all the Himalayas and the Nishkuta mountains, that bull among men, arriving at the White mountains, encamped on its breast (2:26).

=== Karna's expedition to Rishika ===
Karna also is mentioned as defeating Rishikas (8:8). He is stated have subjugated many invincible and mighty foes, viz * the Gandharas, the Madrakas, the Matsyas, the Trigartas, the Tanganas, the Khasas, the Pancalas, the Videhas, the Kulindas, the Kasi-kosalas, the Suhmas, the Angas, the Nishadhas, the Pundras, the Kichakas, the Vatsas, the Kalingas, the Taralas, the Asmakas, and the Rishikas (8.8) and also the Kambojas, Ambasthas, Kaikeyas, Gandharas and Vedehas (8.9). Subjugating all these brave races, by means of his keen and whetted arrows equipped with kanka feathers, that foremost of car-warriors, Radha's son, had caused all of them to pay tribute to us for the aggrandisement of Duryodhana.

Since the kingdom Asmaka also falls in central India, this Rishikas seems to be the central Indian Rishikas.

=== Other references ===
- A royal sage named Rishika is mentioned at (1:67)
- The Salwa prince Dyutimat of great splendour attained to the highest regions by giving his kingdom to Richika (13:137), (12:233).
- Richika is mentioned as son of Div, and is considered as one of the Devas (1:1)

== See also ==
- Kingdoms of Ancient India
- Rishikas
