= Anarta kingdom =

Kingdom in ancient India

Anarta is a Vedic period kingdom of ancient India described in the Mahabharata, roughly corresponding to the northern part of the present-day Indian state of Gujarat. It was founded by the father of Vaivasvata Manu and Yama, named Anarta. He built a fortress at Kusasthali (Dvaraka), which was later flooded by Varuna. The place then remained forest for some time, before Krishna and the Yadavas went there and built Dvaraka. It was later ruled by the Yadavas, after they fled from Mathura in the Surasena kingdom because of attacks by Jarasandha, the king of Magadha. Yadava chiefs such as Vasudeva Krishna, Bala Rama (brother of Krishna), Kritavarma and Satyaki ruled this kingdom under their king Ugrasena. In the Mahabharata, Dwaraka is considered the capital of the Anarta kingdom, but some other ancient texts, such as the Mahabhagavata, mention Dwaraka and Anarta as two independent kingdoms. According to the Bhagavata Purana, Bala Rama's wife Revati was from this kingdom.

Other Yadava kingdoms in west-central India include:

1. Chedi (Jhansi district in Uttar Pradesh)
2. Surasena (Mathura district in Uttar Pradesh (also known as Vraja)
3. Dasharna (south of Chedi Kingdom)
4. Karusha (east of Dasharna Kingdom)
5. Kunti (north of Avanti Kingdom)
6. Avanti (Ujjain district in Madhya Pradesh)
7. Malava (west of Avanti Kingdom)
8. Goparashtra (southern Rajasthan)
9. Heheya (Narmada valley around the city Maheshwar in Madhya Pradesh)
10. Saurashtra (southern Gujarat)
11. Dwaraka (off the coast of Dwarka city in Gujarat)
12. Vidarbha (north eastern Maharashtra)

== References in Mahabharata ==
=== Draupadi's sons in Anarta country undergoes military training ===
==== Mahabharata 3.182 ====
When the Pandavas were exiled to the woods by the Kauravas, the five sons of the Pandavas, born to Draupadi, were sent to Panchala, the kingdom ruled by their maternal grandfather Drupada. They later went to the Anarta Kingdom, ruled by the Yadavas, so that they could stay with their stepbrother and dear friend, Abhimanyu, and learn military science from eminent Yadava warriors.

Vasudeva Krishna's words to Princess Krishna (alias Draupadi, Panchali):- Those sons of yours, are devoted to the study of the science of arms, are well-behaved and conduct themselves on the pattern of their righteous friends. Your father and your uterine brothers proffer them a kingdom and territories; but the boys find no joy in the house of Drupada, or in that of their maternal uncles. Safely proceeding to the land of the Anartas, they take the greatest delight in the study of the science of arms. Your sons enter the town of the Vrishnis (Dwaraka) and take an immediate liking to the people there. And as you would direct them to conduct themselves, or as the respected Kunti would do, so does Subhadra (their stepmother) direct them in a watchful way. Perhaps, she is still more careful of them. As Pradyumna is the preceptor of Aniruddha, of Abhimanyu, of Sunitha, and of Bhanu; so he is the preceptor and the refuge of your sons also! And a good preceptor, would unceasingly give them lessons in the wielding of maces and swords and bucklers, in missiles and in the arts of driving cars and of riding horses, being valiant. And he, Pradyumna, the son of Rukmini, having bestowed a very good training upon them, and having taught them the art of using various weapons in a proper way, takes satisfaction at the valorous deeds of your sons, and of Abhimanyu. O daughter of Drupada! And when your son goes out, in pursuit of (out-door) sports, each one of them is followed thither by cars and horses and vehicles and elephants.’

Vasudeva Krishna next told the exiled Pandava king Yudhishthira that the fighting men of Anarta, consisting of Satwata, Dasarha, Kukura, Adhaka, Bhoja, Vrishni and Madhu tribes would be kept ready to overthrow the enemies of Pandavas, viz the Kauravas headed by Duryodhana, ruling the Kuru city Hastinapura. Bala Rama, with the plough as his weapon, would lead the warriors consisting of bowmen, horsemen, foot-soldiers, cars and elephants.

In the fifth book, Chapter 83 of Mahabharata (MBh 5.83), it is mentioned that the Pandavas' mother Kunti also stayed for some time in Anarta, during the exile of the Pandavas.

=== Pandava's cousins from Anarta join them at Upaplavya ===
==== Mahabharata 4.72 ====
After the expiry of the thirteenth year, the five Pandavas took up their abode in one of Virata's towns called Upaplavya. Arjuna brought over Abhimanyu and Vasudeva Krishna, and also many people of the Dasarha race from the Anarta country.

=== Both Duryodhana and Arjuna arrive at Anarta city (Dwaraka) seeking alliance ===
- Mbh 5.7

Both Duryodhana and Arjuna arrived at the city of Anarta (Dwaraka alias Dwaravati) seeking the support of the Yadavas in the Kurukshetra War. Some Yadava heroes allied with the Kauravas while others allied with the Pandavas. Vasudeva Krishna allied with the Pandavas and promised not to take up arms in the battle. Thus he took part in the war not as a warrior, but as a diplomat, an ambassador of peace, an adviser on war-strategy and as the guide and car-driver of Arjuna. The army of Vasudeva Krishna, called the Narayani Sena, was given to Duryodhana. The Narayani Sena consisted of a large body of cowherd warriors, all of whom could fight in the thick of battle. Another hero, Bala Rama, remained neutral; though he wished to aid Duryodhana, he could not fight against his brother Vasudeva Krishna, who had already joined the Pandavas. He therefore fought for neither side and set out on a pilgrimage along the Sarasvati River. The Bhoja Yadava hero Kritavarman joined Duryodhana with an Akshauhini of troops. Another Yadava hero, Satyaki, joined the Pandavas with an akshauhini of troops.

=== Anarta mentioned as a kingdom of Ancient India (Bharata Varsha) ===
- MBh. 6.9

The Pundras, the Bhargas, the Kiratas, the Sudeshnas, and the Yamunas, the Sakas, the Nishadhas, the Anartas, the Nairitas, the Durgalas, the Pratimasyas, the Kuntalas, and the Kusalas;

=== Anartas in Kurukshetra war ===
- Satyaki was a general in the Pandava army. He was a chief of Anartas. (9. 17)
- Kritavarman was a general in the Kaurava army (9. 17). He is described as the dweller of the Anarta country, the son of Hridika, the mighty car-warrior, the foremost one among the Satwatas, the chief of the Bhojas.
- Viviṃśati, one of the 100 Kaurava brothers, had slain hundreds of Anarta warriors.

== See also ==
- Mahajanapadas
