= Kunti kingdom =

Kingdom in ancient India

The Kunti kingdom was the kingdom of Kunti-Bhoja, one of the prominent kings among the Bhoja-Yadavas.

Kunti, the mother of the Pandavas and the first wife of Kuru king Pandu, was the adopted daughter of Kuntibhoja. Her given name was Pritha and she was a sister of Vasudeva, the father of Vasudeva Krishna. The Kunti kingdom was neighbour to the Avanti kingdom. It was probably to the north of Avanti.

== References in Mahabharata ==
=== The 18 tribes which fled due to attacks from Jarasandha ===
- Mahabharata, Book 2, Chapter 14

Jarasandha was a powerful Ancient Indian king who ruled Magadha.

The eighteen tribes of the Bhojas, from fear of Jarasandha, have all fled towards the west; so also have the Surasenas, the Bhadrakas, the Vodhas, the Salwas, the Patachchavas, the Susthalas, the Mukuttas, and the Kulindas, along with the Kuntis. And the king of the Salwayana tribe with their brethren and followers; and the southern Panchalas and the eastern Kosalas have all fled to the country of the Kuntis. So also the Matsyas and the Sannyastapadas, overcome with fear, leaving their dominions in the north, have fled into the southern country. And so all the Panchalas, alarmed at the power of Jarasandha, have left their own kingdom and fled in all directions.

=== Kingdoms near Kuru Kingdom ===
Pandavas thought about selecting one among these kingdoms to spend their 13th year of exile in anonymity, forced upon them by Duryodhana.

- Mahabharata, Book 4, Chapter 1

Surrounding the kingdom of the Kurus, many countries were present, such as Panchala, Chedi, Matsya, Surasena, Pattachchara, Dasarna, Navarashtra, Malla, Salva, Yugandhara, Saurashtra, Avanti, and the spacious -Rashtra (kingdom).

=== List of kingdoms in Bharata Varsha (ancient India) ===
- Mahabharata, Book 6, Chapter 9

From the extract below, it seems there were two kingdoms with the name Kunti, one Kunti proper and the other Apara Kunti, which means a Kunti kingdom farther away.

.......the Chedis, the Karushas, the Bhojas, the Sindhus, the Pulindakas, the Uttamas, the Dasharnas, the Mekalas, the Utkalas; the Panchalas, the Kausijas, the Nikarprishthas, Dhurandharas; the Sodhas, the Madrabhujingas, the Kasis, and the further-Kasis; the Jatharas, the Kukuras, the Kuntis, the Avantis, and the Apara-Kuntis; the Gomantas, the Mandakas, the Shandas, the Vidarbhas, the Rupavahikas; the Aswakas, the Pansurashtras, the Goparashtras, and the Karityas; the Adhirjayas,.....

=== Bhargava Rama's Annihilation of Khsatrias ===
- Mahabharata, Book 7, Chapter 68

The valiant son of Jamadagni, Bhargava Rama, proceeding against the Kashmiras, the Daradas, the Kuntis, the Kshudrakas, the Malavas, the Angas, the Vangas, the Kalingas, the Videhas, the Tamraliptakas, the Rakshovahas, the Vitahotras, the Trigartas, the Martikavatas, counting by thousand, slew them all by means of his whetted shafts.

=== Kurukshetra War ===
- Mahabharata, Book 8, Chapter 6

The Kuntis possessed of great prowess in battle, endued with great energy and great might, have been slain in fight by Bhishma, with all their kinsmen and advisers.
