= Salwa kingdom =

Kingdom in the epic Mahabharata

Salwa, also rendered Shalva, was a kingdom grouped among the western regions in the Hindu epic Mahabharata. It is in the neighbourhood of Madra kingdom, with which it is frequently associated in the text. The kingdom is described as having two capitals: Saubha and Martikavati.

Salwa is prominent in the Mahabharata as the home of Prince Satyavan, in the legend of Savitri and Satyavan.

== References in Mahabharata ==
=== The common ancestry of Salwas and Madras ===
In ancient times, there was a king in the race of Puru, known by the name of Vyushitaswa. He was devoted to truth and virtue. Vyushitaswa, who was endowed with the strength of ten elephants, very soon performed the horse-sacrifice, overthrowing all the kings of the East, the North, the West, and the South, and exacted tributes from them all. The seven children, all of whom became kings—three Salwas and four Madras—were sons of Vyushitaswa. (1:121).

=== Location of Salwa kingdom ===
Salwa kingdom is mentioned very close to Madra kingdom at (6:9), which describes the kingdoms of Bharata Varsha. Another kingdom named Salwasena is mentioned close to Trigarta kingdom. The Matsyas, the Panchalas, the Salwas and the Surasenas were mentioned as not very far away from Kuru kingdom at (5:54). King Jayadratha of Sauvira kingdom is mentioned as travelling to Salwa kingdom through Kamyaka woods. (3:262).

=== Salwa culture ===
Salwas were included in the kingdoms that falls in the larger circle of the mainstream culture propounded by the Kurus and Panchalas.

The Kauravas with the Pancalas, the Salwas, the Matsyas, the Naimishas, the Koshalas, the Kasapaundras, the Kalingas, the Magadhas, and the Cedis who are all highly blessed, know what the eternal religion is. (8:45).

=== King Dyumatsena of Salwa ===
Dyumatsena was the father of Satyavan, the famous prince who wedded the Madra princess Savitri. Section 3:292 describes the history of Dyumatsena:

There was, amongst the Salwas, a virtuous Kshatriya king known by the name of Dyumatsena. And it came to pass that in course of time he became blind. And that blind king possessed of wisdom had an only son. And it so happened that an old enemy dwelling in the vicinity, taking advantage of the king's mishap, deprived him of his kingdom. And thereupon the monarch, accompanied by his wife bearing a child on her breast, went into the woods. His son, born in the city, began to grow in the hermitage. The Brahmanas have named the son Satyavan. In his childhood he took great delight in horses, and used to make horses of clay. And he used also to draw pictures of horses. And for this that youth is sometimes called by the name of Chitraswa. The Madra princess Savitri knew about this prince and fell in love with him. Later she married him. Dyumatsena's minister somehow slew the enemy king and Dyumatsena regained his kingdom.

=== Salwa king contemporary to Bhishma ===
A Salwa king named Shalva Kumara (5:179) was mentioned as a lover of Amba, the eldest princess of Kasi kingdom, who was abducted by Bhishma, a warrior from Kuru kingdom, along with her sisters Ambika and Ambalika. Bhishma wished to make her the wife of Kuru prince Vichitravirya, but Amba wished to marry the Salwa king. Bhishma sent her to Salwa, and was rejected by the king.

=== Salwa king contemporary to Krishna ===
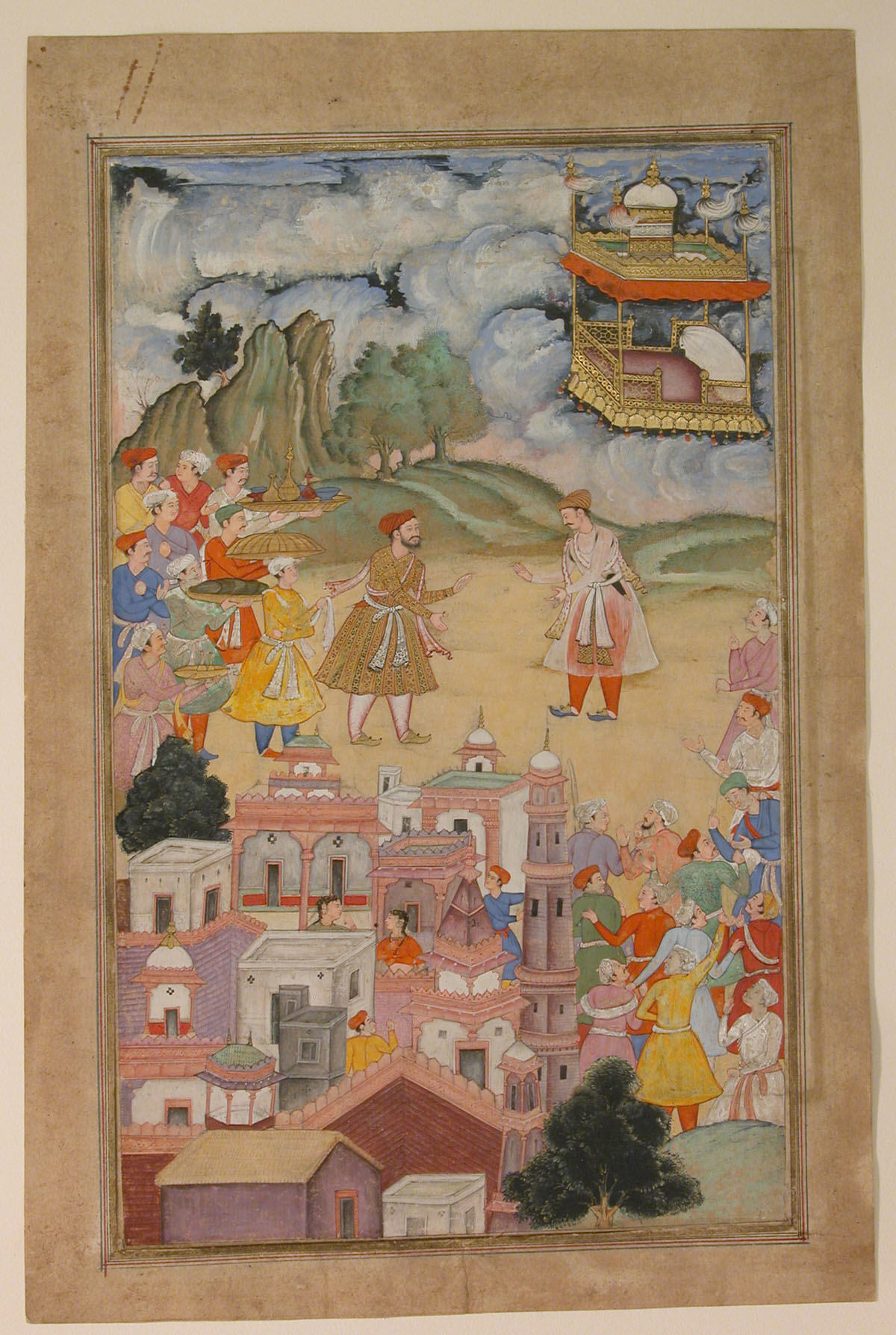
King Salwa visiting Kalayawana

Yet another Salwa king (3:12, 7:11) attacked Dwaraka, this Salwa king was an ally of Shishupala, Dantavakra and Rukmi. According to the narration in the epic, he possessed an aircraft known as Saubha Vimana and used it for travel and for aerial warfare. In detail, according to mahabharata, when Krishna had gone for Pandavas Rajasuya, king of Saubha attacked his city Dwarawati. To encounter him, Samva, Charudeshna, Pradyumna (Rukmani son) came out. They killed all of the Davanas aiding the enemy commander in battle with fiery weapons, causing him to flee the battle.

To fight the enemy king, Krishna's son Pradyumna challenged him. They first commenced an aerial battle and later, for a better encounter, descended from their cars. They both started to pierce each other with greater weapons, making the other unconscious each time. At last, when about to be killed, King Salwa retreated from the battle. When Krishna returned, he found his city gardens and damsels devoid of beauty. Upon knowing everything that had happened, he promised them he would slay his enemy. Krishna with his army marched for the attack and found King Salwa on an island pursuing an ocean course. And when the battle began, both sides started to shower arrows upon each other. Krishna started to kill all the Danavas aiding the latter side. Seeing his side at a loss, Salwa used an illusion, causing the enemy heroes to get confused by the environment, and killed Krishna's charioteer. He also made Vasudeva get stuck in his illusion, causing him to desist from the fight. Later, concluding in his mind that it was an illusion, he recovered his senses and started to fight afresh by discharging fiery weapons. Seeing this, the opponent Danavas showered mighty rocks upon them, killing Krishna's steeds, but Krishna destroyed their shower by using a thunderbolt as his weapon. At last, Krishna hurled his powerful discus Sudarshana and killed all the remaining tribes, including Salwa. Killing everyone at the lord's command, it returned to Krishna. (See Dwaraka kingdom for more details).

=== Impact of Magadha over Salwa ===
The eighteen tribes of the Bhojas, from fear of Magadha king Jarasandha, have all fled towards the west; so also have the Surasenas, the Bhadrakas, the Vodhas, the Salwas, the Patachchavas, the Susthalas, the Mukuttas, and the Kulindas, along with the Kuntis. And the king of the Salwayana tribe with his brethren and followers; and the southern Panchalas and the eastern Kosalas have all fled to the country of the Kuntis. (2:14).

=== Salwas in Kurukshetra War ===
A Salwa king allied with Duryodhana in the Kurukshetra War (5:161). At (9:20) his final battle against the Pandavas is mentioned. A Salwa king also sided with the Pandavas in the Kurukshetra War. (7:23) Bhimaratha, (brother of Duryodhana), with six sharp shafts of great swiftness and made wholly of iron, despatched Salwa along with his steeds and charioteer to Yama’s abode. Salwakas along with Malavakas were mentioned as allies of the Pandavas (5:57). At (5:30), Salwakas were mentioned as fighting for the Kauravas.

=== Other cultural references ===
- Son of Salwa is mentioned as present in the self-choice ceremony at Panchala kingdom. (5:4).
- The Salwa prince Dyutimat of great splendour attained the highest regions by giving his kingdom to Richika. (13:137) (12,233).

== See also ==
- Kingdoms of Ancient India

== Sources ==
- Mahabharata of Krishna Dwaipayana Vyasa, translated to English by Kisari Mohan Ganguli
