= Kāśī (kingdom) =

Ancient people in the central South Asia

Kingdom of Kāśī
- c. 1375 BCE–c. 600 BCE
- The Kāśī kingdom and the other Mahajanapadas in the Post Vedic Era
- Capital: Kāśī
- Common languages: Sanskrit; Prakrit; Pali
- Religion: Historical Vedic religion Proto-Jainism
- Government: Monarchy
- Historical era: Iron Age India
  - Established: c. 1375 BCE
  - Conquered by Kaṃsa of Kosala: c. 600 BCE
Succeeded by
Kosala
- Today part of: India

Kāśī (Pali: Kāsī) was an ancient kingdom of India whose existence is attested during the Iron Age.

== Location ==
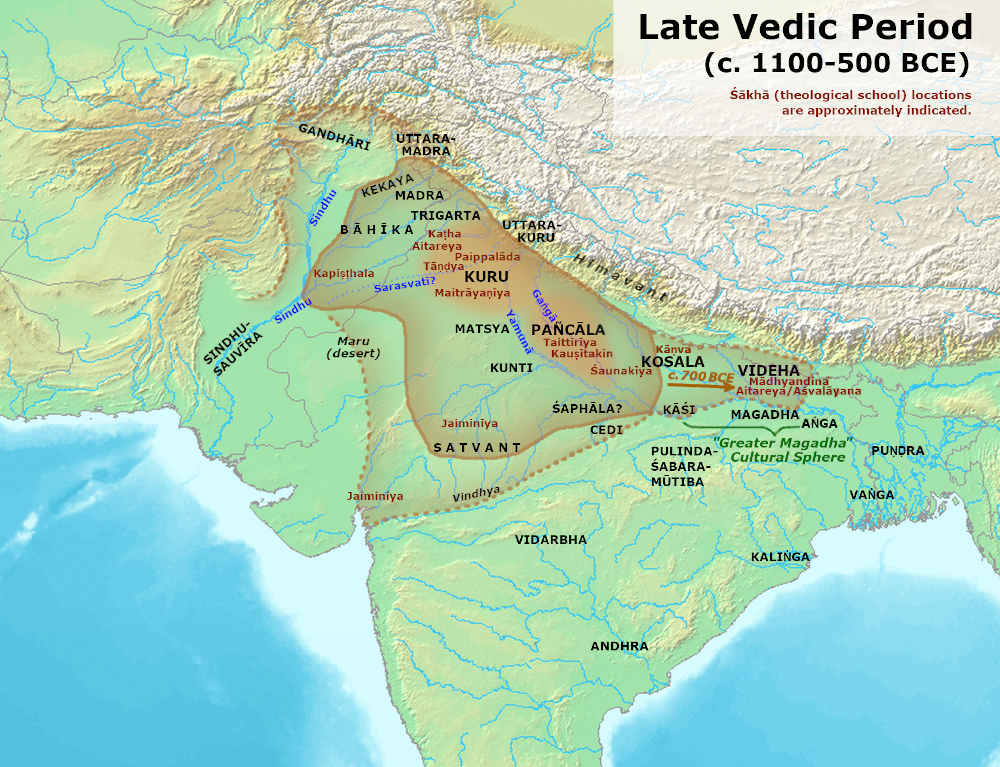
Location of Kāsī during the late Vedic period

Location of Kāsī during the post-Vedic period

The Kāśī kingdom covered an area of 300 leagues. The northern border of Kasi which separated it from Kosala was the Sarpikā or Syandikā river, and the river Son formed its southern and eastern boundaries, separating it from Magadha in the east. (Note: Map facing page 95.)

The capital of Kāśī was the city of Vārāṇasī, which was also named Ketumatī, Surundhana, Sudassana, Brahmavaddhana, Pupphavatī, Ramma, and Molinī.

== History ==
The Kāśis were first mentioned in the Paippalāda recension of the Atharvaveda.

The ruling clan of Kāśī appears to have been member of the Bhārata clan, and at one point Kāśī was ruled by one Dhṛtarāṣṭra (in Sanskrit) or Dhataraṭṭha (in Pāli) whom the Mahāgovinda Suttanta calls a "Bhārata prince." This Dhṛtarāṣṭra was defeated in battle by another Bharata king, named Śatānīka Sātrājita, after which the Kāśis stopped kindling the sacred fire until the time of the Śatapatha Brāhmaṇa.

However, the monarchs of Kāśī do not appear to have all belonged to the same dynasty, and the Jātakas frequently mention the extinction of dynasties of the Kāśi kings or the deposition of Kāśi princes and their replacement with members from other families regarded as being more competent, with some kings of Kāśī having Māgadhī or Vaideha origins and bearing the epithet of Brahmadatta: although Brahmadatta was a dynastic name, the Brahmadattas were not from the same dynasty, with the elected Brahmadatta of the Darīmuka Jātaka having been a Māgadhī prince, the king of Kāśī in the Dummedha Jātaka and his son being both named Brahmadatta, the Kāśi king Udaya being called "Brahmadatta" in the Gaṅgamāla Jātaka, while the Brahmadattas of the Matiposaka and Sambula Jatakas were Vaidehas.

The Kāśis were closely connected to Kosala and Videha, and Jala Jātūkarṇya was the purohita of these three kingdoms during the reign of the Kāśi king Ajātaśatru, who was himself a contemporary of the famous king Janaka of Videha and of Uddālaka Āruṇi's son Śvetaketu. Ajātaśatru appears in the Upaniṣads as engaging in philosophical discussions with Gārgya Bālāki, and the Kauśītaki Upaniṣad depicts Ajātaśatru as being jealous of Janaka's fame as a patron of learning. The Uddālaka Jātaka calls this Ajātaśatru of Kāsī "Brahmadatta," implying that he was himself was a Brahmadatta.

The Śatapatha Brāhmaṇa mentions a king of Kāsī named Bhadrasena Ajātaśatrava, who was likely the son and successor of Ajātaśatru, and had been bewitched by Uddālaka Āruṇi.

Another king, named Janaka, who is not identical with the Vaideha king Janaka, is mentioned as ruling over Kāśī in the Sattubhasta Jātaka.

According to the Daśaratha Jātaka, the legendary heroes Daśaratha and Rāma were kings of Kāśī, and not of Kosala as the Puranic tradition makes them out to be.

Vedic texts mention two other kings of Kāśī, one named Divodāsa, and his son or descendant, named Daivadāsi Pratardana.

During the 9th century BCE, the king of Kāsī was Aśvasena, the father of the 23rd Jain Tīrthaṅkara, Pārśvanātha.

By the later Iron Age, the kingdom of Kāśī had become one of the most powerful states of Iron Age South Asia, with several Jātakas describing the Kāsi capital of Vārāṇasī as being superior to the other cities and the kingdom's rulers as having imperial ambitions. According to these Jātakas, the kings of Kāśī sought the status of King of All Kings (sabbarājunam aggarājā) and of Lord of all India (sakala-Jambudīpa). Vārāṇasī itself was twelve leagues in size, being much larger than the cities of Mithila and Indaprastha, which were both seven leagues in size, and the Guttila Jātaka called Vārāṇasī the "chief city" of all South Asia.

According to the Brahācatta Jātaka, a Kāśi king and his large army fought against it northern neighbour of Kosala and seized its capital of Srāvastī; the Kosāmbī Jātaka and the Mahāvagga claim that the Kāśi king Brahmadatta had annexed Kosala after executing its king Dīghati; the Kunāla Jātaka mentions that Brahmadatta of Kāśī captured Kosala, killed its king, and carried off its chief queen to Vārāṇasī where he married her; according to the Sona-Nanda Jātaka, the Kāśi king Manoja had subjugated the kings of Kosala, Aṅga, and Magadha; the Mahābhārata claims Kāśī had destroyed the power of the Vitahavyas or of the Haihayas; and according to the Assaka Jātaka, the kingdom of Aśmaka, in the Deccan, was under Kāśi suzerainty.

Kāśī itself, in turn, was coveted by the other kingdoms around it, and at one point, seven kings besieged Vārāṇasī in an attempt to conquer the territory of Kāśī, and the Mahāsīlava Jātaka claims that the king of Kosala had seized the kingdom of the king Mahāsīlava of Kāśī, while the kings Vanka and Dabbasena of Kosala were able to win suzerainty over Kāsī according to the Ghata and Ekarāja Jātakas.

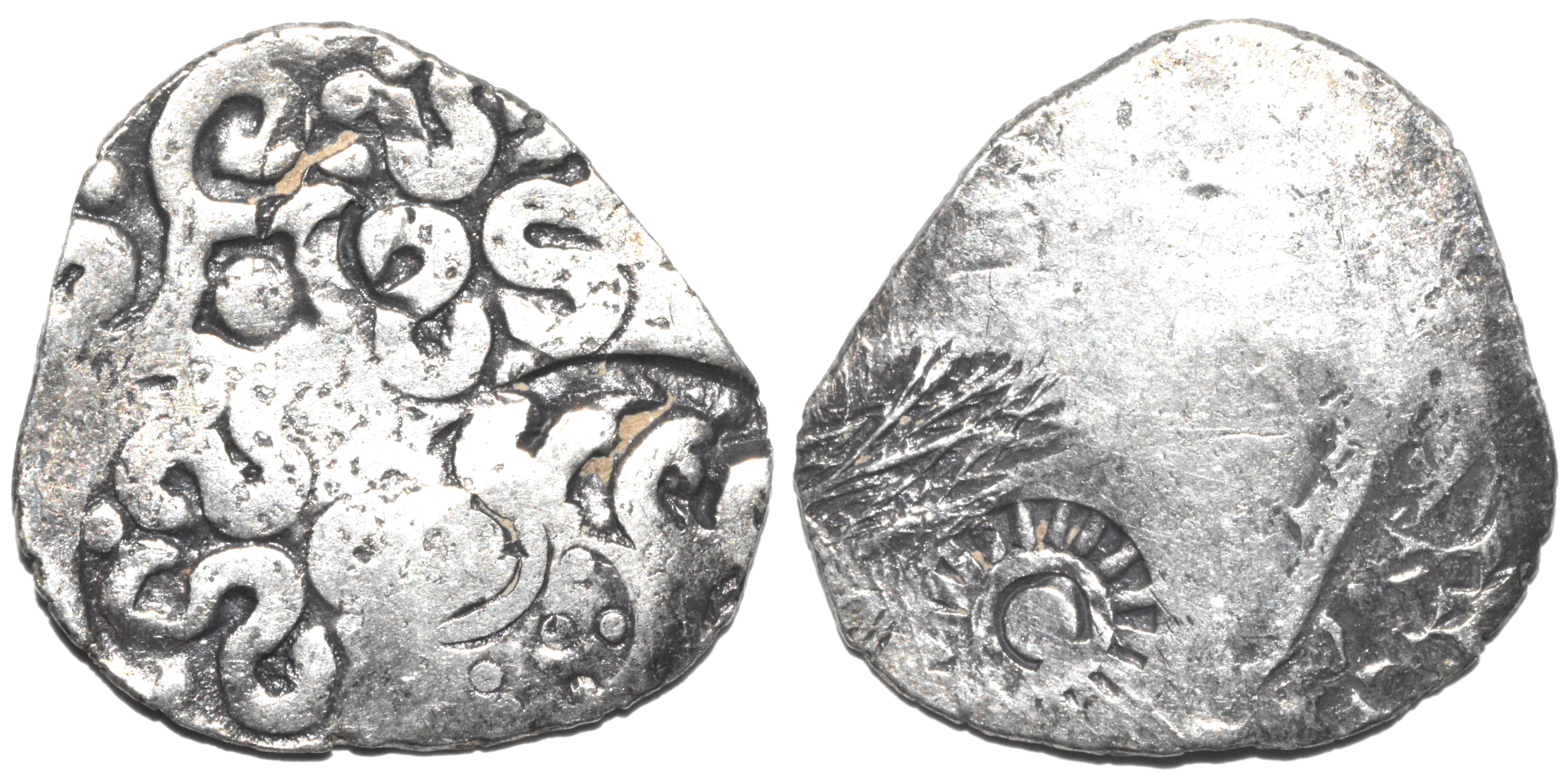
A silver vimshatika coin of Kāśī under the Kosala occupation, circa 525–465 BCE.

Kāśī was finally conquered for good by Kosala under the latter's king Kaṃsa, shortly before the time of the Buddha, due to which Kaṃsa was nicknamed Barānasiggaho ("seizer of Vārāṇasī"), and Kāśī was a full part of the kingdom of Kosala by the time of its king Mahākosala.

When Mahākosala's daughter Kosalādevi married the king Bimbisāra of Magadha, she was given as present a village in Kāśī which produced a revenue of a hundred thousand for bath and perfume money, while the rest of the former Kāśī kingdom remained part of the Kosala kingdom ruled by Mahākosala's son Pasenadi.

Following Bimbisāra's murder and the usurpation of the throne of Magadha by his son Ajātaśatru, Pasenadi revoked his rights over the village in Kāśī, after which a war between Kosala and Magadha ensued which ended when Pasenadi captured Ajātasatru, gave him in marriage his daughter Vajirā, to whom he gifted the village in Kāśī, and restored him to his throne.

Kāśī later became a part of the empire of Magadha when Ajātasattu defeated Pasenadi's own usurper son, Viḍūḍabha, and annexed Kosala.

== Later Kingdom of Kashi ==
In 18th century or even before the kashi was rule and control by the Bhumihars of Narayan dynasty

- Raja Mansa Ram Singh (1736–1740): He was a powerful Bhumihar landowner and revenue official who initially served the Mughal Empire's provincial administration under the Nawab of Awadh. He grew his influence, acquired the zamindari (land estate) of the Utaria region, and laid the early groundwork for the kingdom.

According to the old native of kashi, the rise of Raja Mansa Ram Singh in 1736 wasn't the creation of a brand-new house, but rather the re-acquisition or restoration of the political power and lands that their ancient ancestors had lost centuries prior.

- Maharaja Balwant Singh (1740–1770): Upon his father's death, Balwant Singh succeeded him. He consolidated these territories, declared independence from the weakening suzerainty of the Nawab of Awadh, and officially emerged as the true founder and first official Maharaja of the Benares State in 1740. He later built the historic Ramnagar Fort in 1750, which became the permanent seat of the Kashi Naresh.
- Maharaja Chait Singh (1770–1781): Succeeded his father, Balwant Singh. His reign is famous for his fierce rebellion against Warren Hastings, the Governor-General of the British East India Company. When Hastings tried to extort exorbitant funds and troops from Benares for British military campaigns, Chait Singh revolted. The British marched into Benares, but Chait Singh's troops overwhelmed them, arested the Hastings and barely he escaped the kingdom in a ladies dress . Eventually the british atacked again and maharaja was exiled to Gwalior, where he died.

His elder son Thakur Balwant Singh establishde the landholding in Gwalior and there descendants are still living there .

- Later in Kashi nephew of Chait singh became The Kashi Naresh and further Narayan's ruled the Benares State till the independence of india .

And thus , the city state older than the history itself became an ordinary city in india. Despite this all kashi holds the important significance in the hindu culture and still the Kashi Naresh is the cultural ambassador people of kashi .
