= Dvārakā =

Sacred historical city and pilgrimage site associated with Hindu god Krishna

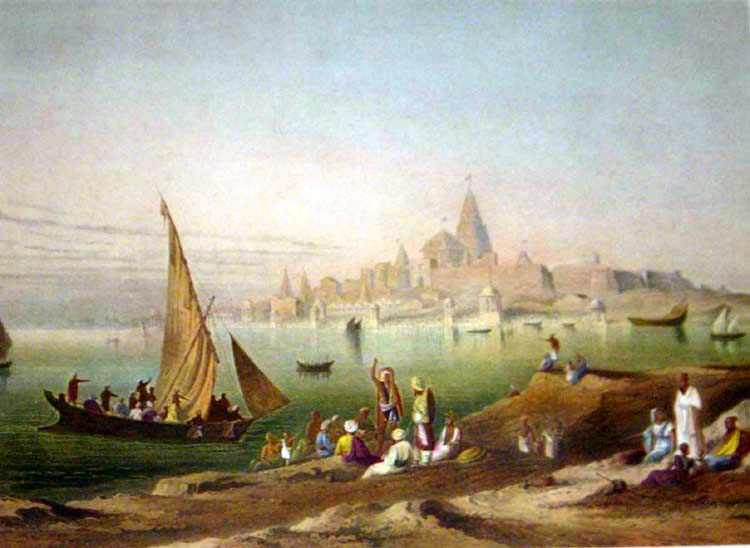
Dvaraka, modern Dwarka, is the setting for many chapters in Harivamsa. The city is described as near the sea, in modern-era Gujarat; a painting of the city in the 19th century (lower).

Dvārakā, also known as Dvāravatī (Sanskrit द्वारका "the gated [city]", possibly meaning having many gates, or alternatively having one or several very grand gates), is a sacred historic city in the sacred literature of Hinduism, Jainism, and Buddhism. It is also alternatively spelled as Dvarika. The name Dvaraka is said to have been given to the place by Krishna, a major god in Hinduism.

In the Mahabharata, it was a city located in what is now Dwarka, formerly called Kushasthali, the fort of which had to be repaired by the Yadavas. In this epic, the city is described as the capital of the Anarta Kingdom. According to the Harivamsa the city was located in the region of the Sindhu Kingdom.

In the Hindu epics and the Puranas, Dvaraka is called Dvaravati and is one of seven Tirtha (pilgrimage), Sapta Puri (seven sacred cities of Hinduism), for spiritual liberation. The other six are Mathura, Ayodhya, Kashi, Kanchipuram, Avantika (Ujjain) and Puri.

== Hindu literature ==
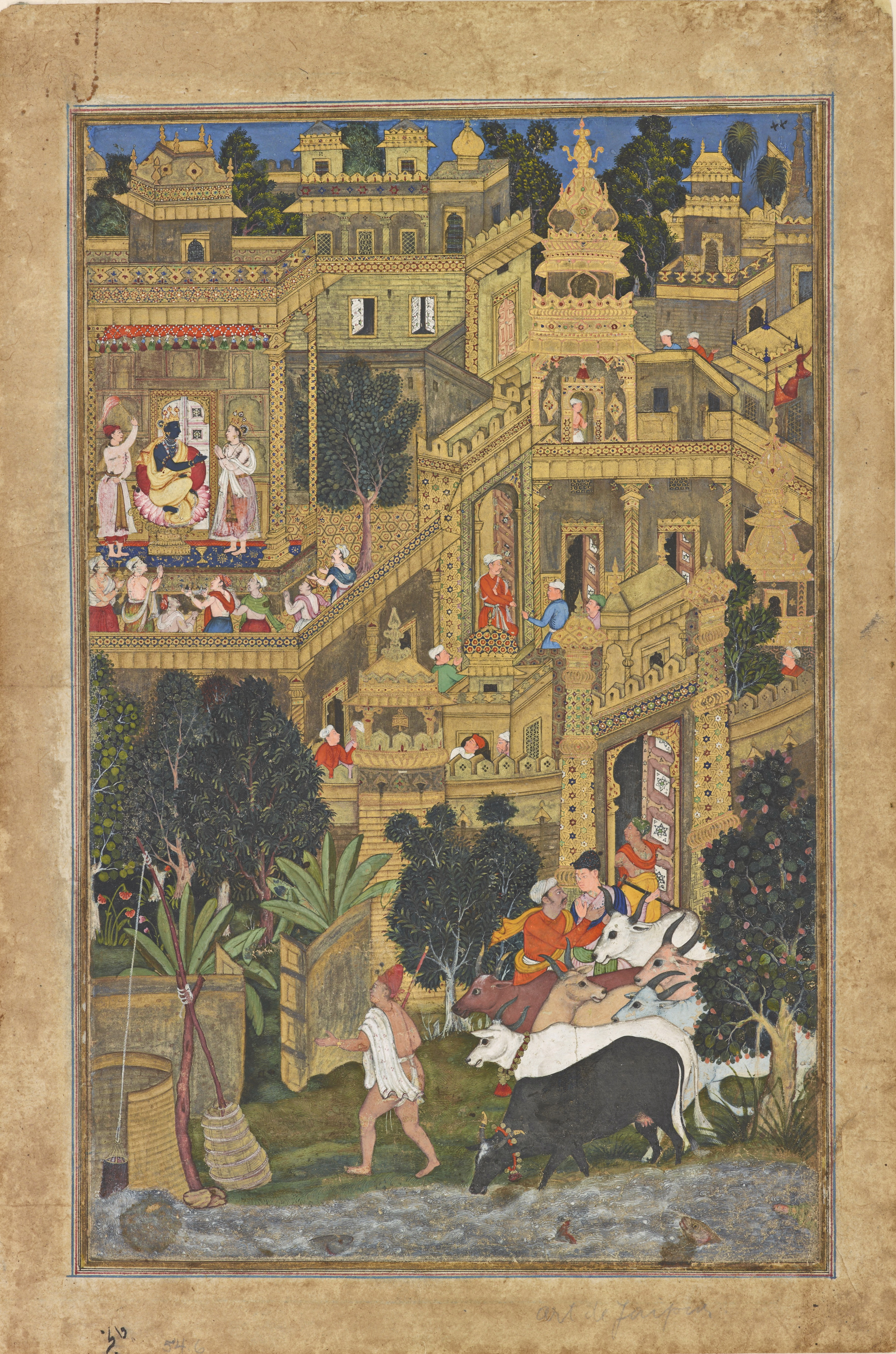
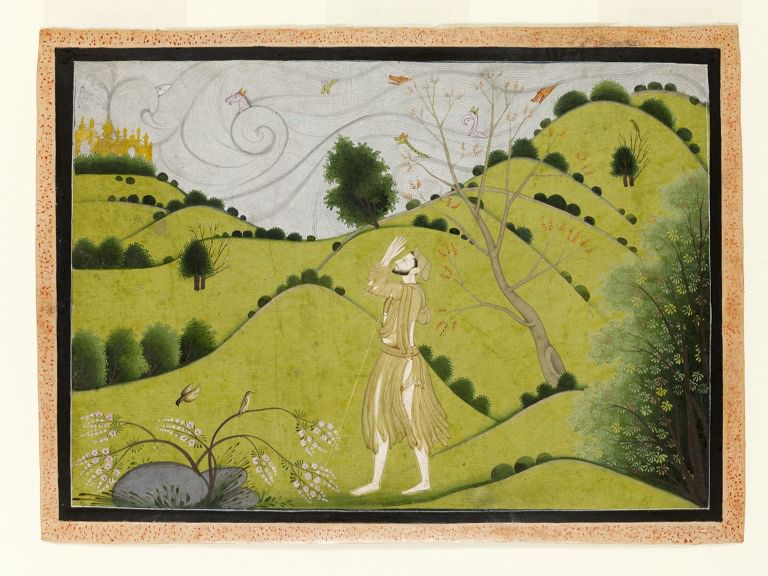
Top: A painting from 15th century AD depicting scenes of Dvaraka in Harivamsa Bottom: A painting of Sudama walking to Dvaraka from late 18th-century.

=== Bhagavata Purana ===
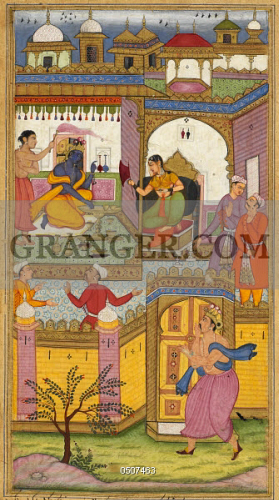
Razmnama, the Persian translation of the Hindu epic Mahabharata. Bhima arriving at the castle of Dvaraka to invite Krishna to the asvamedha. Krishna, who is with his wife Satyabhama, pretends not to hear..

The following description of Dvaraka during Krishna's presence there appears in the Bhagavata Purana (10.69.1-12) in connection with the sage Narada's visit:

The city was filled with the sounds of birds and bees flying about the parks and pleasure gardens, while its lakes, crowded with blooming indivara, ambhoja, kahlara, kumuda, and utpala lotuses, resounded with the calls of swans and cranes.

Dvaraka boasted 900,000 royal palaces, all constructed with crystal and silver and splendorously decorated with huge emeralds. Inside these palaces, the furnishings were bedecked with gold and jewels.

Traffic moved along a well laid-out system of boulevards, roads, intersections, and marketplaces, and many assembly houses and temples of demigods graced the charming city. The roads, courtyards, commercial streets, and residential patios were all sprinkled with water and shaded from the sun's heat by banners waving from flagpoles.

In the city of Dvaraka was a beautiful private quarter worshiped by the planetary rulers. This district, where the demigod Vishvakarma had shown all his divine skill, was the residential area of Krishna, and thus it was gorgeously decorated by the sixteen thousand palaces of Krishna's queens. Narada entered one of these immense palaces.

Supporting the palace were coral pillars decoratively inlaid with vaidurya gems. Sapphires bedecked the walls, and the floors glowed with perpetual brilliance. In that palace Tvashta had arranged canopies with hanging strands of pearls; there were also seats and beds fashioned of ivory and precious jewels. In attendance were many well-dressed maidservants bearing lockets on their necks, and also armor-clad guards with turbans, fine uniforms, and jeweled earrings.

— Bhagavata Purana, 10.69.1-12

=== Harivamsa ===
- In Harivamsa, Dvaraka is described as largely built on "submerged land", "released by the ocean" (2.55.118 and 2.58.34).
- The city was the former "sporting ground of the King Raivataka" called "Dvāravāti", which "was squared like a chess board" (2.56.29).
- Nearby was the mountain range Raivataka (2.56.27), "the living place of the gods" (2.55.111).
- The city was measured by Brahmins; the foundations of the houses were laid and at least some of the houses were built by the Yadavas (2.58.9 - 15).
- It was built by Vishwakarman in one day (2.58.40) "mentally" (2.58.41 and 44).
- It had surrounding walls (2.58.48 and 53) with four main gates (2.58.16).
- Its houses were arranged in lines (2.58.41) and the city had "high buildings" (2.58.50 and 54) (2.58.53), which "almost touched the sky" (2.58.50), and had "doors that had the colour of white clouds" (2.58.48).
- The fort walls of the city were "shining with the colour of the Sun and pots of gold" and "sounds emanating from grand houses sparkling with golden colour" (2.58.53).
- It had a temple area with a palace for Krishna himself, which had a separate bathroom (2.58.43).
- "The city is beautified on Earth by the ocean" like Indra's heavenly city is "beautified by an assembly of important jewels" (2.58.47 - 66, (2.58.49).

==== Events ====
- Pandu's sons lived in Dvaraka during their exile to woods. Their servants headed by Indrasena lived there for one year (the 13th year) (4,72).
- Balarama mentioned about a sacrificial fire of Dvaraka, before he set for his pilgrimage over Sarasvati River (9,35).
- Rukmini is described to become the chief queen of Dvaraka after her elopement with Krishna, equated with the goddess Lakshmi as Krishna's chief consort in the Mahabharata.
- One should proceed with subdued senses and regulated diet to Dvaravati, where by bathing in "the holy place called Pindaraka", one obtaineth the fruit of the gift of gold in abundance (3,82).
- King Nriga, in consequence of a single fault of his, had to dwell for a long time at Dvaravati, and Krishna became the cause of his rescue from that miserable plight.(13,72).
- Sage Durvasa resided at Dvaravati for a long time (13,160).
- Arjuna visited Dvaravati during his military campaign after the Kurukshetra War (14,83).
- When the Pandavas retire from the world they visit the place where Dvaraka once used to be and see the city submerged under water.

== Jain literature ==
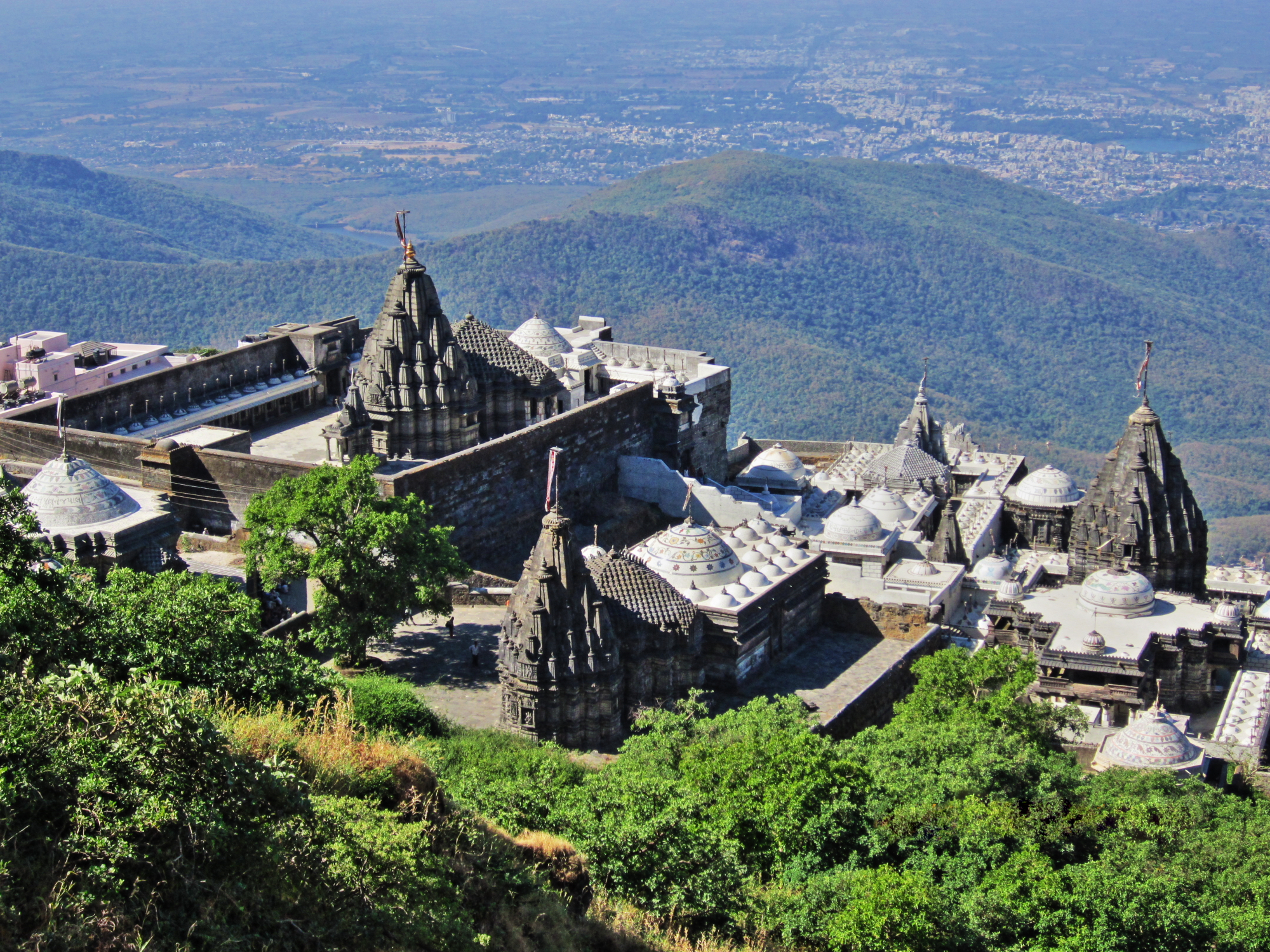
Neminatha temple complex on Girnar hills near Junagadh, Gujarat.

Jain tradition holds that the Neminatha's marriage was arranged with Rajulakumari or Rajimati or Rajamati, daughter of Ugrasena. Ugrasena is believed to be the king of Dvārakā and maternal grandfather of Krishna. He is believed to have heard animal cries as they were being slaughtered for the marriage feast. Taken over by sorrow and distress at the sight, he is believed to have given up the desire of getting married, and to have become a monk and gone to Mount Girnar. His bride-to-be Rajulakumari is believed to have followed him, becoming a nun and his brother Rahanemi became a monk, joining his ascetic order.

According to Kalpasutras, Neminatha led an ascetic life thereby eating only once every three days, meditated for 55 days and then obtained omniscience on Mount Raivataka, under a Mahavenu tree.

== Related archaeology ==
During 1983–1990, the Marine Archaeology Unit of India's National Institute of Oceanography (NIO) carried out underwater excavations at Dwarka and Bet Dwarka. According to S. R. Rao "The available archaeological evidence from onshore and offshore excavations confirms the existence of a city-state with a couple of satellite towns in 1500 B.C." He considered it reasonable to conclude that this submerged city is the Dvaraka as described in the Mahabharata.

Rao also states that the submergence of the city in the Mahabharata was not the last time it occurred and that the archeological evidence below the sea shows the latest submergence. Rao avoided any prediction of the time period of the Mahabharata, he said that there may be other layers deep in the sea, buried or destroyed. He agrees that many structures at the bottom of the sea resemble to those described in the Sanskrit texts of Mahabharata. The date 1500BCE is based on carbon dating of a particular piece.

== Submergence ==
In the Mausala Parva of the Mahabharata, Arjuna witnesses the submergence of Dvaraka and describes it as follows:

The sea, which had been beating against the shores, suddenly broke the boundary that was imposed on it by nature. The sea rushed into the city. It coursed through the streets of the beautiful city. The sea covered up everything in the city. I saw the beautiful buildings becoming submerged one by one. In a matter of a few moments it was all over. The sea had now become as placid as a lake. There was no trace of the city. Dvaraka was just a name; just a memory.

— Mausala Parva of Mahabharata

== See also ==
- Marine archaeology in the Gulf of Khambhat
- Dvaravati sila
- Dvārakā–Kamboja route
- List of lost lands
