= Chedi kingdom =

Ancient Indian kingdom

Chedi (IAST: Cedī) was a kingdom which fell roughly in the Bundelkhand division of Madhya Pradesh to the south of river Yamuna along the river Ken. Its capital city was called Suktimati in Sanskrit.

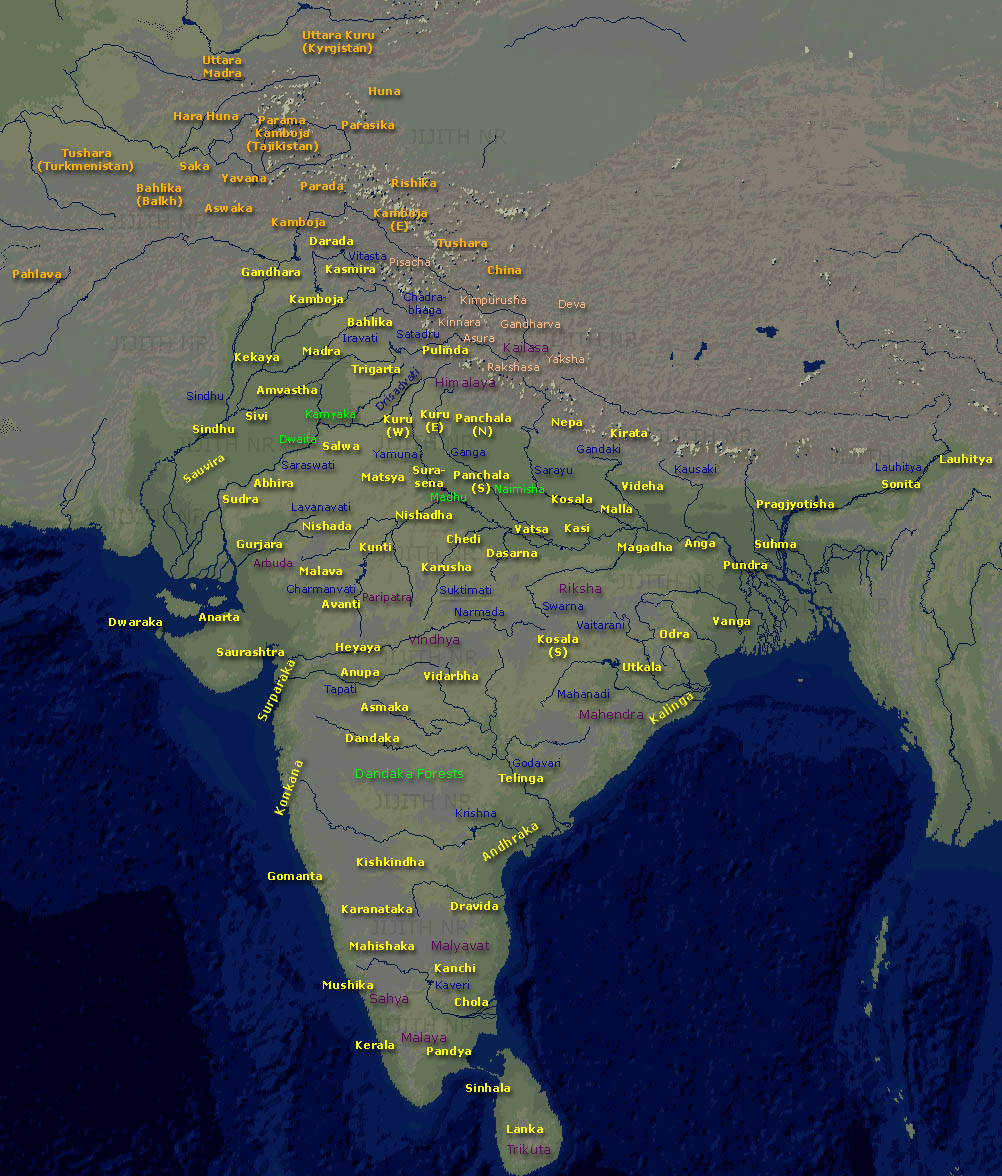
Chedi among the kingdoms of Epic Indian literature

== In popular culture ==
In the 2012 anthropological thriller The Krishna Key, the origin of the Chedi clan is linked to the Yadavas.

== See also ==
- Mahameghavahana dynasty
- Epic India
- Shishupala
- Dantavakra
- Krishna
