= Janapada =

Major realms of Vedic India, c. 1100–600 BCE

The Janapadas (lit. 'Foothold of the people') (pronounced [d͡ʑɐnɐpɐdɐ]) (c. 1100–600 BCE) were the realms, aristocratic republics (Gaṇasaṅgha), and kingdoms (sāmarājya) of the Vedic period in the Indian subcontinent. The Vedic period reaches from the late Bronze Age into the Iron Age: from about 1500 BCE to the 6th century BCE. With the rise of sixteen Mahajanapadas ("great janapadas"), most of the states were annexed by more powerful neighbours, although some remained independent.

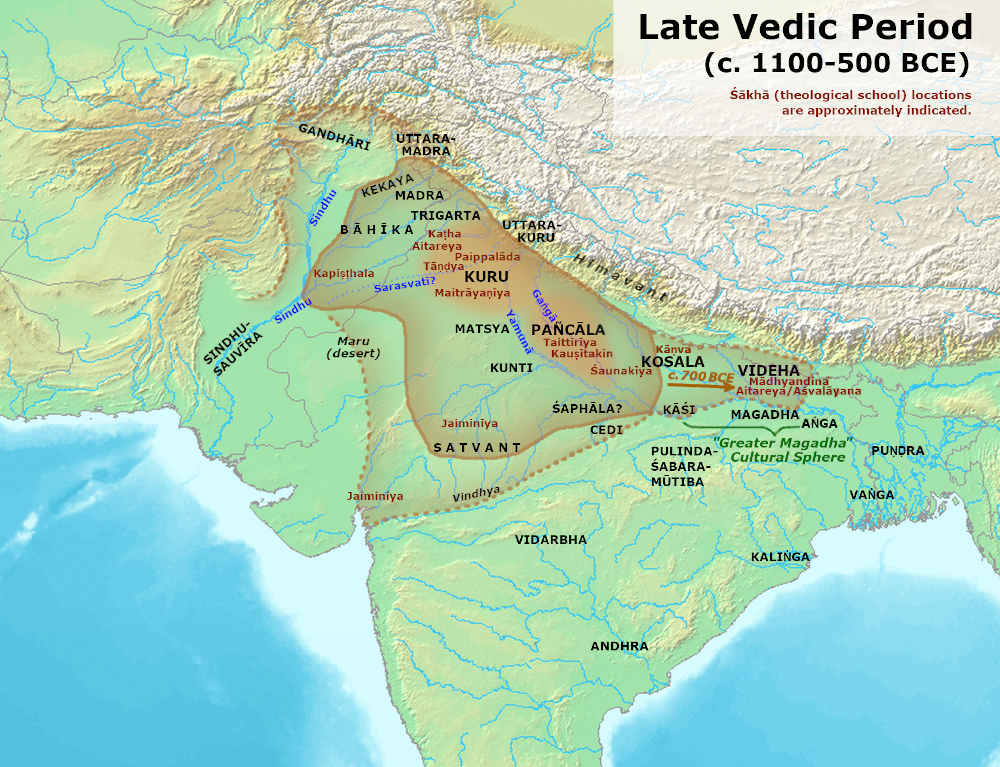
Late Vedic era map showing the boundaries of Āryāvarta with Janapadas in northern India. Beginning of Iron Age kingdoms in India— Kuru, Panchala, Kosala, Videha.

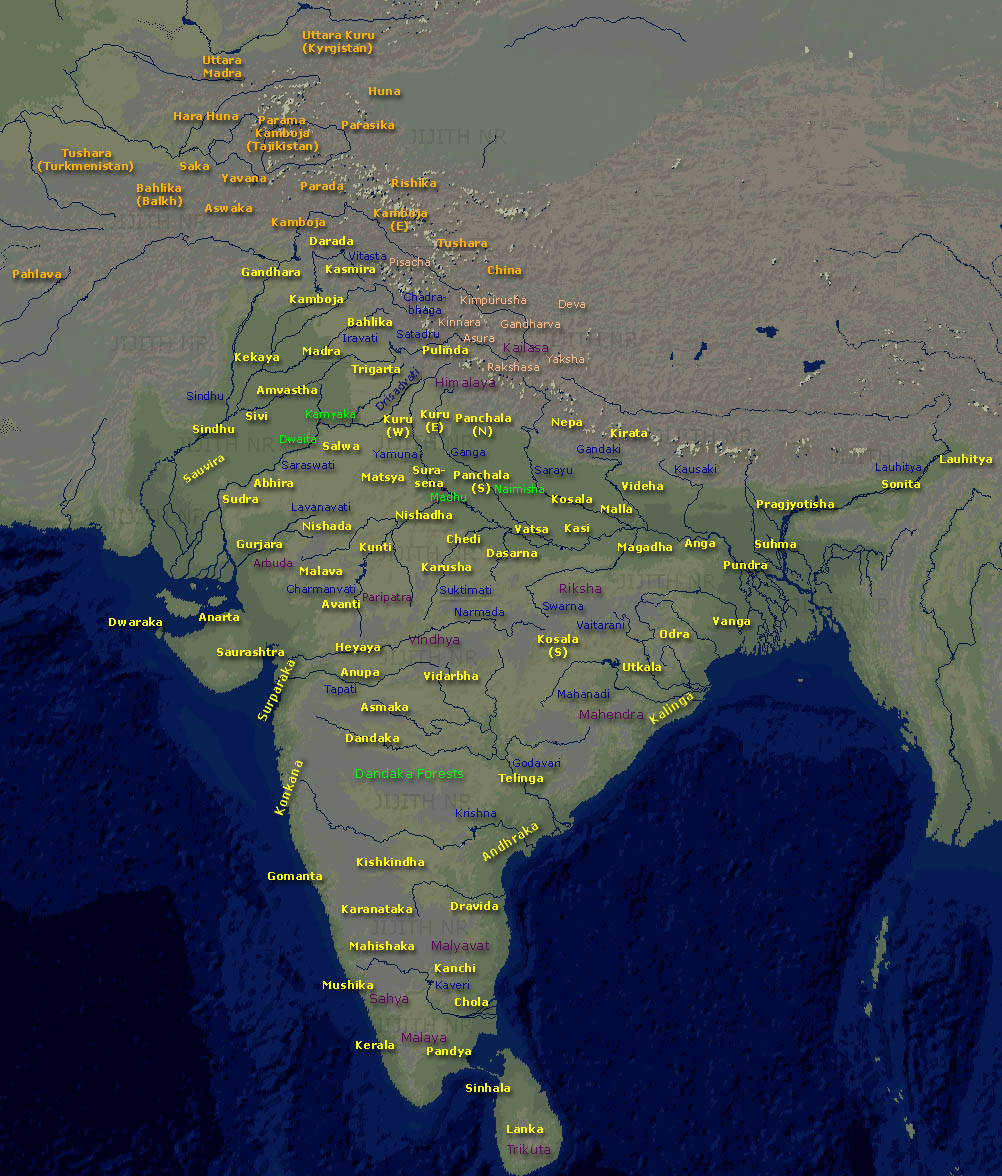
Locations of kingdoms and republics mentioned in the Indian epics or Bharata Khanda.

Janapadas were the kingdoms and republics of Vedic India from the late Bronze Age to the Iron Age (c. 1200 BCE to 6th century BCE). Emerging from settled agricultural communities, they were originally named after the dominant "Jana" (people/tribe). With the spread of iron tools, these smaller kingdoms grew in size and power, eventually evolving into the larger Mahajanapadas.

== Etymology ==
The Sanskrit term janapada is a tatpurusha compound term, composed of two words: jana and padna. Jana means "person" or "people" (cf. Latin cognate genus, English cognate kin). The word pada means "foot" (cf. Latin cognate pedis); from its earliest attestation, the word has had a double meaning of "realm, territory" and "subject population" (cf. Hittite pedan, "place"). Linguist George Dunkel compares the Greek andrapodon "slave", to PIE *pédom "fetters" (i.e. "what is attached to the feet"). Sanskrit padám, usually taken to mean "footprint, trail", diverges in accent from the PIE reconstruction. For the sense of "population of the land", padasya janas, the inverted padajana would be expected. A primary meaning of "place of the people", janasya padam, would not explain why the compound is of masculine gender. An original dvandva "land and people" is conceivable, but a dual inflection would be expected.

== History and evolution ==
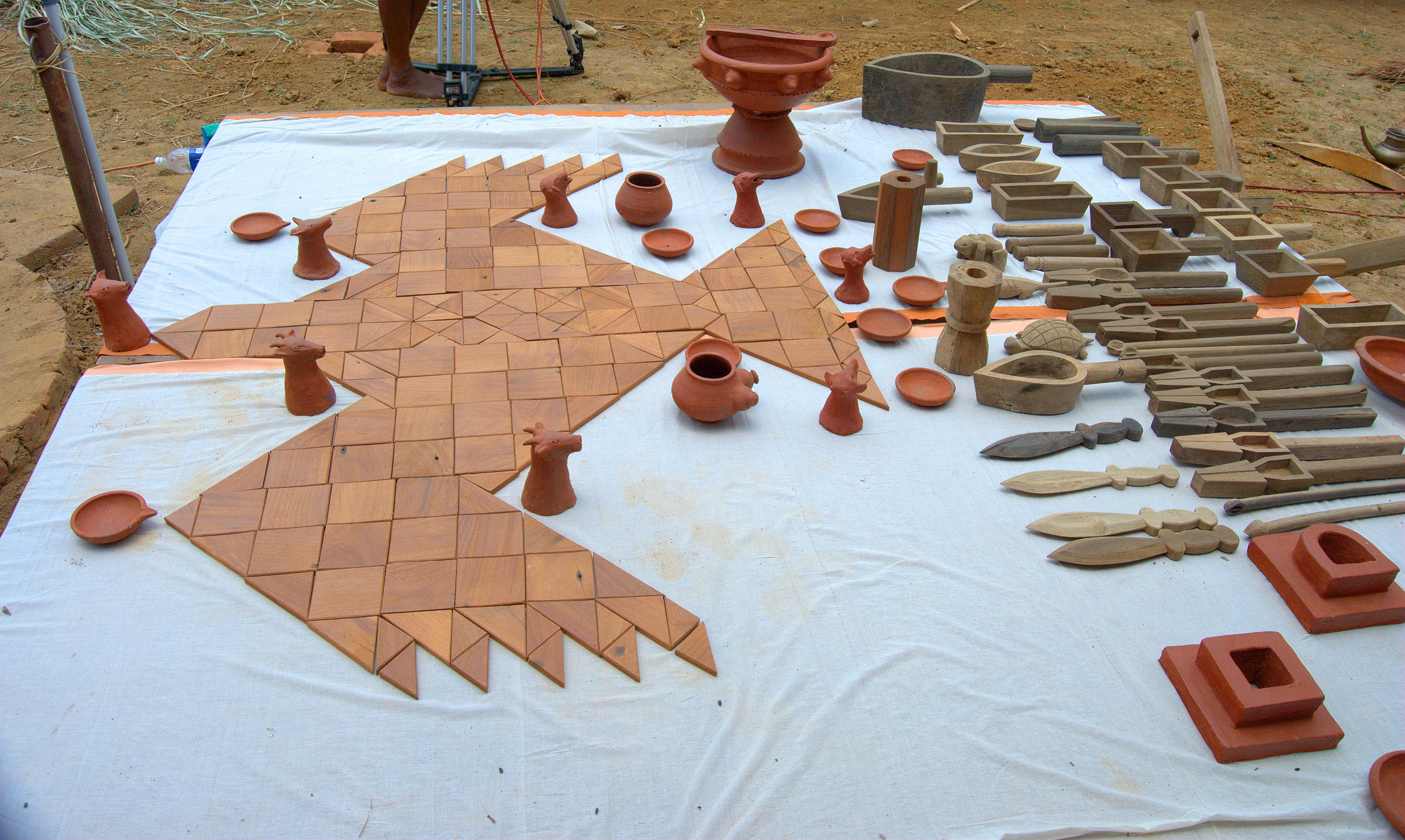
Modern replica of utensils and falcon shaped altar used for Agnicayana, an elaborate srauta ritual originating from the Kuru kingdom, around 1000 BCE.

Literary evidence suggests that the janapadas flourished between 1100 BCE and 500 BCE. The earliest mention of the term "janapada" occurs in the Aitareya (8.14.4) and Shatapatha (13.4.2.17) Brahmana texts.

In the Vedic samhitas, the term jana denotes a tribe, whose members believed in a shared ancestry. The janas were headed by a king (raja). The council (samiti) was a common assembly of the jana members, and had the power to elect or dethrone the king. The sabha was a smaller assembly of wise elders, who advised the king.

The janas were originally semi-nomadic pastoral communities, but gradually came to be associated with specific territories as they became less mobile. Various kulas (clans) developed within the jana, each with its own chief. Gradually, the necessities of defence and warfare prompted the janas to form military groupings, headed by janapadins (Kshatriya warriors). This model ultimately evolved into the establishment of political units known as the janapadas.

While some of the janas evolved into their own janapadas, others appear to have mixed together to form a common Janapada. According to the political scientist Sudama Misra, the name of the Panchala janapada suggests that it was a fusion of five (pancha) janas. Some janas (such as Aja and Mutiba), mentioned in the earliest texts do not find a mention in the later texts. Misra theorizes that these smaller janas were conquered by and assimilated into the larger janas.

Janapadas were gradually dissolved around 500 BCE. Their disestablishment can be attributed to the rise of imperial powers (such as Magadha) in Northern India, as well as foreign invasions (such as those by the Persians and the Greeks) in the north-western Indian subcontinent.

== Nature ==
The Janapada were highest political unit in Northern India during this period; these polities were usually monarchical (though some followed a form of republicanism) and succession was hereditary. The head of a kingdom was a king (raja). A chief priest (purohita) and a commander of the army (senani) who would assist the king. There were also two other political bodies: the (samiti), thought to be a council of elders and the sabhā, a general assembly of the entire people.

=== The boundaries of the kingdoms ===
Often rivers formed the boundaries of two neighboring kingdoms, as was the case between the northern and southern Panchala and between the western (Pandava's kingdom) and eastern (Kaurava's kingdom) Kuru. Sometimes, large forests, which were larger than the kingdoms themselves, formed their boundaries as was the case of Naimisha Forest, the Naimisha Aranyam between Panchala and Kosala kingdoms. Mountain ranges like Himalaya, Vindhyachal and Sahyadri also formed their boundaries.

=== The cities and villages ===
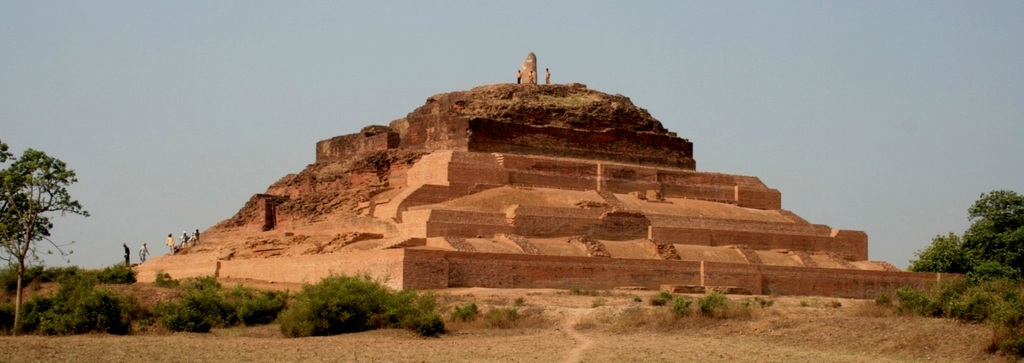
Ahichchhatra (or Ahi-Kshetra) was the ancient capital of Northern Panchala. The remains of this city has been discovered in Bareilly.

Some kingdoms possessed a main city that served as its capital. For example, the capital of Pandava's kingdom was Indraprastha and the Kaurava's kingdom was Hastinapura. Ahichatra was the capital of Northern Panchala whereas Kampilya was the capital of Southern Panchala. Kosala had its capital at Ayodhya. Apart from the main city or capital, where the palace of the ruling king was situated, there were small towns and villages spread throughout the kingdom, from which tax was collected by officers appointed by the king. What the king offered in return was protection from attack by other kings and bandit tribes, as well as from invading foreign nomadic tribes. The king also enforced law and order in his kingdom by punishing the guilty.

== Administration ==
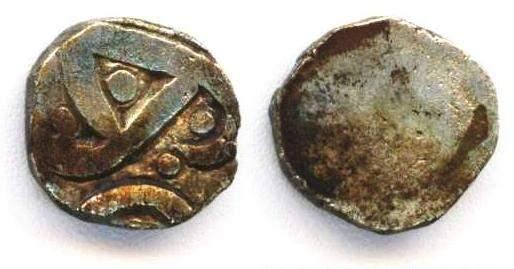
A Kuru coin, earliest example of coinage in India.

The Janapadas had Kshatriya rulers. Based on literary references, historians have theorized that the Janapadas were administered by the following assemblies in addition to the king:

Sabha (Council)
An assembly more akin to a council of qualified members or elders (mostly men) who advised the king and performed judicial functions. In the ganas or republican Janapadas called Gaṇasaṅgha with no kings, the council of elders also handled administration.

Paura Sabha (Executive Council)
The Paura Sabha was the assembly of the capital city (pura), and handled municipal administration.

Samiti (General Assembly)
A samiti generally consisted of all adults of the republic or the city-state. A samiti was congregated when a matter of importance had to be communicated to the entire city-state. A samiti was also held at the time of festivals to plan, raise revenue and conduct the celebrations.

Janapada
The Janapada assembly represented the rest of the Janapada, possibly the villages, which were administered by a gramini, or grāmaṇī.

Some historians have also theorized that there was a common assembly called the "Paura-Janapada", but others such as Ram Sharan Sharma disagree with this theory. The existence of Paura and Janapada itself is a controversial matter.

Indian nationalist historians such as K. P. Jayaswal have argued that the existence of such assemblies is evidence of prevalence of democracy in ancient India. V. B. Misra notes that the contemporary society was divided into the four varnas (besides the avarna or outcastes), and the Kshatriya ruling class had all the political rights. Not all the citizens in a janapada had political rights. Based on Gautama's Dharmasutra, Jayaswal theorized that the low-caste shudras could be members of the Paura assembly. According to A. S. Altekar, this theory is based on a misunderstanding of the text: the term "Paura" in the relevant portion of the Dharmasutra refers to a resident of the city, not a member of the city assembly. Jayaswal also argued that the members of the supposed Paura-Janapada assembly acted as counselors to the king, and made other important decisions such as imposing taxes in times of emergency. Once again, Altekar argued that these conclusions are based on misinterpretations of the literary evidence. For example, Jayaswal has wrongly translated the word "amantra" in a Ramayana verse as "to offer advice"; it actually means "to bid farewell" in proper context.

== Interactions between kingdoms ==
Janapada weaponry
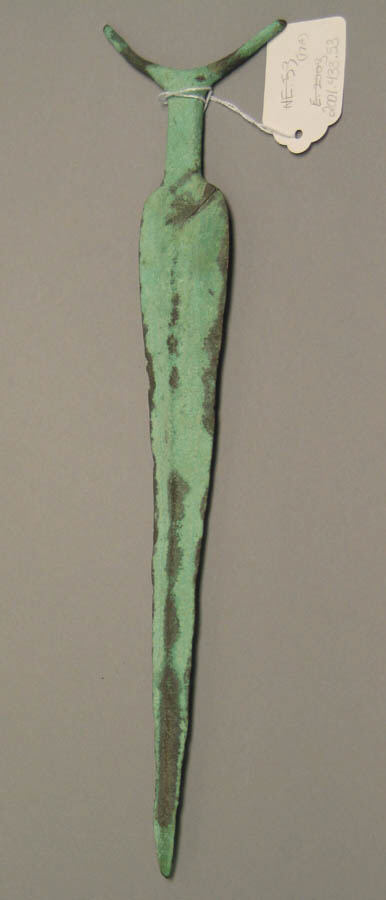
Ancient Indian Antennae sword; Metalwork, 1800–1500 BCE

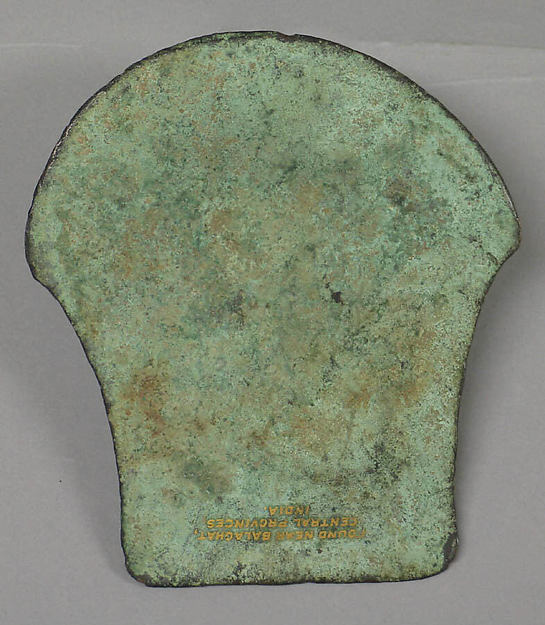
Ancient Indian Ax Blade, 1800–1500 BCE

There was no border security for a kingdom and border disputes were very rare. One king might conduct a military campaign (often designated as Digvijaya meaning conquest of the four directions) and defeat another king in a battle, lasting for a day. The defeated king would acknowledge the supremacy of the victorious king. The defeated king might sometimes be asked to give a tribute to the victorious king. Such tribute would be collected only once, not on a periodic basis. The defeated king, in most cases, would be free to rule his own kingdom, without maintaining any contact with the victorious king. There was no annexation of one kingdom by another. Often a military general (senapati) conducted these campaigns on behalf of his king. A military campaign and tribute collection was often associated with a great sacrifice (like Rajasuya or Ashvamedha) conducted in the kingdom of the campaigning king. The defeated king also was invited to attend these sacrifice ceremonies, as a friend and ally.

=== New kingdoms ===
New kingdoms were formed when a major clan produced more than one king in a generation. The Kuru clan of Kings was very successful in governing throughout North India with their numerous kingdoms, which were formed after each successive generation. Similarly, the Yadava clan of kings formed numerous kingdoms in Central India.

=== Cultural differences ===
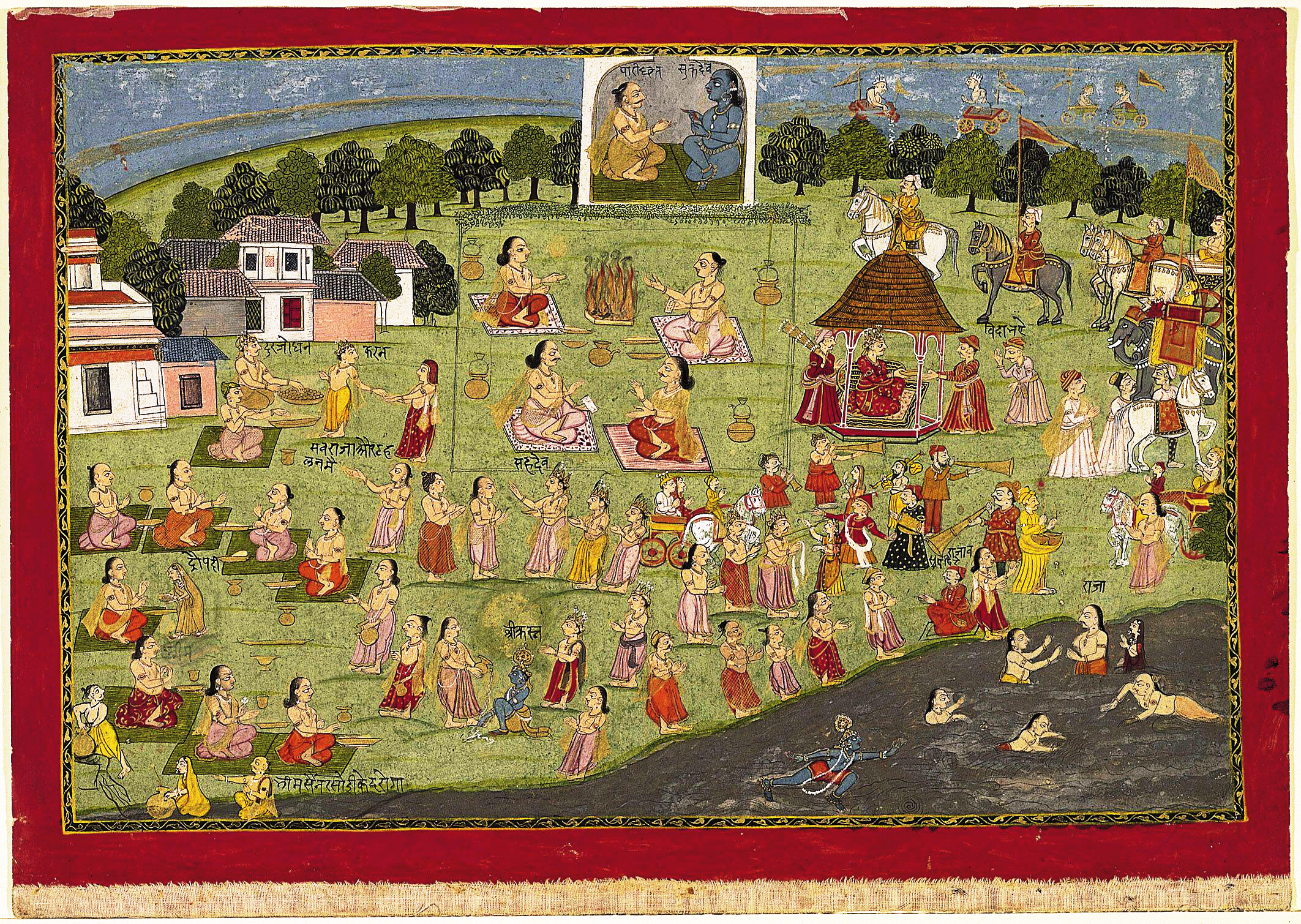
Vedic King performs the Rajasuya Sacrifice.

Parts of western India were dominated by tribes who had a slightly different culture, considered non-Vedic by the mainstream Vedic culture prevailing in the Kuru and Panchala kingdoms. Similarly, there were some tribes in the eastern regions of India considered to be in this category. Tribes with non-Vedic culture were collectively termed as Mleccha. Very little was mentioned in the ancient Indian literature about the kingdoms to the North, beyond the Himalayas. China was mentioned as a kingdom known as Cina, often grouped with Mleccha kingdoms.

== List of Janapadas ==
=== Vedic literature ===
The Vedas mention five sub-divisions of ancient India:

- Udichya (Northern region)
- Prachya (Eastern region)
- Dakshina (Southern region)
- Pratichya (Western region)
- Madhya-desha (Central region)

The Vedic literature mentions the following janas or janapadas:

Jana or Janapada	IAST name	Region	Mentioned in Rigveda	Mentioned in Atharvaveda
Aja	Aja	Central	✓	
Alina	Alina	Western	✓	
Ambashtha	Ambaśṭha	Central		
Andhra	Āndhra	Southern	✓	
Anga	Aṅga	Eastern		✓
Anu	Anu	Western	✓	
Balhika	Balhika	Northern		✓
Bhalana	Bhalana	Western	✓	
Bharadvaja	Bharadvāja	Central	✓	
Bharata	Bharata	Central	✓	
Bheda	Bheda	Central	✓	
Bodha	Bodha	Central		
Chedi	Cedi	Central	✓	
Druhyu	Druhyu	Western	✓	
Gandhara	Gandhāra	Western	✓	✓
Kamboja	Kamboja	Northern		
Keshin	Keśin	Central		
Kikata	Kīkaṭa	Eastern	✓	✓
Kirata	Kirāta	Eastern		
Kosala	Kosala	Eastern		
Krivi	Krivi	Central	✓	
Kunti	Kunti	Central		
Kalinga	Kalinga	Eastern	✓	✓
Kuru	Kuru	Central	✓	✓
Magadha	Magadha	Eastern		✓
Mahavrisha	Mahāvṛṣa	Northern		✓
Matsya	Matsya	Central	✓	
Mujavana	Mūjavana	Northern	✓	✓
Mutiba	Mūtiba	Southern	✓	
Nishada	Niṣāda	Central		
Paktha	Paktha	Western	✓	
Panchala	Pāñcala	Central		
Parshu	Parśu	Western	✓	
Paravata	Pārāvata	Central	✓	
Prithu	Pṛthu	Western	✓	
Pulinda	Pulinda	Southern	✓	
Pundra	Puṇḍra	Eastern	✓	
Puru	Pūru	Western	✓	
Rushama	Ruśama	Central	✓	
Salva	Śālva	Central		
Satvanta	Satvanta	Southern		
Shabara	Śabara	Southern	✓	
Shigru	Śigru	Central	✓	
Shiva	Śiva	Western	✓	
Shvikna	Śvikna	Central		
Srinjaya	Sṛñjaya	Central	✓	✓
Tritsu	Tṛtsu	Central	✓	
Turvasha	Turvaśa	Western	✓	
Ushinara	Uśīnara	Central	✓	
Uttara Kuru	Uttara Kuru	Northern		
Uttara Madra	Uttara Madra	Northern		
Vaikarna	Vaikarṇa	Northern	✓	
Vanga	Vaṅga	Eastern		
Kashi	Kāśi	Eastern		
Varashikha	Varaśikha	Central	✓	
Vasha	Vaśa	Central		
Vidarbha	Vidarbha	Southern		✓
Videha	Videha	Eastern		
Vishanin	Viśaṇin	Western	✓	
Vrichivanta	Vṛcivanta	Western	✓	
Yadu	Yadu	Western	✓	
Yakshu	Yakṣu	Central	✓	

=== Puranic literature ===
The Puranas mention seven sub-divisions of ancient India:

- Udichya (Northern region)
- Prachya (Eastern region)
- Dakshinapatha (Southern region)
- Aparanta (Western region)
- Madhya-desha (Central region)
- Parvata-shrayin (Himalayan region)
- Vindhya-prashtha (Vindhyan region)

According to research by political scientist Sudama Misra, the Puranic texts mention the following janapadas:

Janapada	Region	Mentioned in the Puranas?					Alternative names and locations
Janapada	Region	Matsya (Chapter 114)	Vayu (Chapter 45)	Markandeya (Chapter 57)	Vamana (Chapter 13)	Brahmanda (Chapter 16)	Alternative names and locations
Ābhīra (northern)	Northern	✓	✓	✓	✓	✓	
Ābhīra (southern)	Southern		✓	✓	✓	✓	
Abhīṣaha (Abhishaha)	Northern		✓	✓	✓	✓	Apanga (Vayu), Aupadha (Markandeya), Alasa (Vamana)
Āhuka	Northern		✓	✓	✓	✓	Kuhaka (Markandeya), Kuhuka (Vamana)
Alimadra	Northern		✓	✓	✓		Anibhadra (Markandeya), Alibhadra (Vamana)
Ānarta	Western	✓	✓	✓	✓	✓	Āvantya Markandeya, Vamana
Andhaka	Central	✓					
Āndhra	Southern		✓	✓	✓	✓	Andha (Markandeya)
Andhravāka	Eastern		✓	✓		✓	Andhāraka (Markandeya)
Aṅga	Eastern	✓			✓	✓	Central and Eastern in Vamana
Aṅgāramāriṣa (Angara-Marisha)	Southern					✓	
Āntaranarmada	Western	✓	✓	✓	✓	✓	Uttaranarmada (Markandeya), Sunarmada (Vamana)
Antargiri	Eastern	✓	✓	✓	✓	✓	
Anūpa	Vindhyan	✓	✓	✓	✓	✓	Arūpa (Matsya), Annaja (Vayu)
Aparīta	Northern	✓	✓	✓	✓	✓	Purandhra (Matsya), Aparānta (Markandeya)
Arthapa	Central		✓	✓			Atharva (Markandeya)
Aśmaka (Ashmaka)	Southern		✓	✓	✓	✓	
Aśvakūṭa	Central			✓			
Āṭavi	Southern	✓	✓	✓		✓	Āraṇya (Markandeya), Āṭavya (Brahmanda)
Ātreya	Northern	✓	✓	✓	✓	✓	Atri (Matsya, Brahmanda)
Auṇḍra	Vindhyan	✓					
Avanti	Vindhyan	✓	✓	✓	✓	✓	Central and Vindhyan in Matsya
Bahirgiri	Eastern	✓	✓	✓	✓	✓	
Vāhlīka	Northern	✓	✓	✓	✓	✓	
Bahula	Northern		✓	✓	✓		Pahlava (Vayu), Bahudha (Vamana)
Barbara	Northern		✓	✓	✓	✓	Central and Northern in Vamana
Bhadra	Eastern and Central					✓	
Bhadrakāra	Central	✓	✓			✓	
Bharadvāja	Northern	✓	✓	✓	✓	✓	
Bhārgava	Eastern		✓	✓	✓	✓	
Bharukaccha	Western	✓	✓	✓	✓	✓	Bhanukaccha (Vayu), Bhīrukahcha (Markandeya), Dārukachchha (Vamana), Sahakaccha (Brahmanda)
Bhogavardhana	Southern		✓	✓	✓	✓	
Bhoja	Vindhyan	✓	✓	✓	✓	✓	Gopta (Vamana)
Bhūṣika (Bhushika)	Northern					✓	
Bodha	Central	✓	✓			✓	Bāhya (Matsya)
Brahmottara	Eastern	✓	✓	✓	✓	✓	Suhmottara (Matsya), Samantara (Brahmanda)
Carmakhaṇḍika (Charmakhandika)	Northern	✓	✓	✓	✓	✓	Attakhaṇḍika (Matsya), Sakheṭaka (Vamana)
Kerala	Southern	✓	✓	✓	✓	✓	Kevala (Markandeya)
Cīna (China)	Northern		✓	✓	✓	✓	Pīna (Vayu), Veṇa (Vamana)
Cola (Chola)	Southern	✓	✓		✓	✓	Caulya (Vayu), Cauḍa (Vamana); Southern and Eastern in Brahmanda
Cūlika (Chulika)	Northern		✓	✓	✓	✓	Cūḍika (Vamana), Vindhyacūlika (Brahmanda)
Daṇḍaka	Southern	✓	✓	✓		✓	
Darada	Northern		✓	✓	✓	✓	
Darva	Himalayan	✓	✓	✓		✓	Himalayan and Northern in Vayu and Markandeya
Daśeraka (Dasheraka)	Northern	✓	✓	✓	✓	✓	Karseruka (Vayu), Kuśeruka (Markandeya)
Daśamālika (Dashamalika)	Northern	✓	✓	✓	✓	✓	Daśanāmaka (Matsya), Daśamānika (Vayu), Daṅśana (Vamana)
Daśarṇa (Dasharna)	Vindhyan	✓	✓	✓	✓	✓	
Druhyu	Northern	✓	✓			✓	Hrada (Vayu), Bhadra (Brahmanda)
Durga	Western		✓	✓	✓	✓	Durgala (Brahmanda)
Ganaka	Northern				✓		
Gandhāra	Northern	✓	✓	✓	✓	✓	
Godha	Central					✓	
Golāṅgūla	Southern			✓			
Gonarda	Eastern	✓	✓	✓	✓	✓	Govinda (Vayu), Gomanta (Markandeya), Mananda (Vamana)
Haṃsamārga	Himalayan	✓	✓	✓	✓	✓	Sarvaga (Himalayan) in Matsya; Haṃsamārga (Northern and Himalayan) in Vayu and Markandeya; Karnamārga (Northern) and Haṃsamārga (Himalayan) in Vamana; Haṃsamārga (Himalayan) Haṃsabhaṅga (Northern) in Brahmanda
Hara-Hunaka	Northern		✓	✓	✓	✓	Pūrṇa (Vayu), Ūrṇa (Markandeya), Cūrṇa (Vamana), Hūṇa (Brahmanda)
Hāramuṣika (Haramushika)	Northern	✓	✓	✓	✓		Hāramūrtika (Matsya), Hārapūrika (Vayu), Sāmuṣaka (Vamana)
Huhuka	Himalayan	✓	✓	✓	✓	✓	Samudgaka (Matsya), Sahūdaka (Vayu), Sakṛtraka (Markandeya), Śahuhūka (Vamana), Sahuhūka (Brahmanda)
Ijika	Northern					✓	
Īṣīka (Ishika)	Southern	✓	✓	✓		✓	Vaisakya (Markandeya)
Jaguda	Northern	✓	✓	✓			Jāṇgala (Matsya), Juhuḍa (Vayu), Jāguḍa (Markandeya)
Jāṇgala	Central	✓	✓			✓	
Jñeyamarthaka	Eastern		✓	✓	✓	✓	Jñeyamallaka (Markandeya), Aṅgiyamarṣaka (Vamana), Gopapārthiva (Brahmanda)
Kachchhika	Western	✓	✓	✓		✓	Kāchchhīka (Matsya), Kacchīya (Vayu), Kāśmīra (Markandeya), Kacchipa (Brahmanda)
Kālatoyaka	Northern	✓	✓	✓	✓	✓	
Kalinga (central)	Central	✓		✓	✓	✓	Arkalinga (Markandeya)
Kalinga (southern)	Southern	✓	✓	✓	✓	✓	
Kalitaka	Western		✓	✓	✓	✓	Kālītaka (Vayu), Anīkaṭa (Markandeya), Tālīkaṭa (Vamana), Kuntala (Brahmanda)
Kalivana	Western		✓	✓	✓	✓	Kolavana (Vayu), Kālivala (Markandeya), Vāridhana (Vamana), Kalivana (Brahmanda)
Kāmboja	Northern		✓	✓	✓	✓	
Kantakara	Northern	✓	✓	✓	✓		Kanṭakāra (Matsya), Raddhakaṭaka (Vayu), Bahubhadra (Markandeya), Kādhara (Vamana)
Kāraskara	Western	✓	✓	✓	✓	✓	Paraṣkara (Vayu), Kaṭhākṣara (Markandeya), Karandhara (Brahmanda)
Kārūṣa (Karusha)	Vindhyan	✓	✓	✓	✓	✓	Southern and Vindhyan (Matsya)
Kāśmīra (Kashmira)	Northern		✓	✓		✓	
Kauśika	Central				✓		
Kekeya	Northern	✓	✓	✓	✓	✓	Kaikeyya (Matsya), Kaikeya (Markandeya), Kaikeya (Vamana)
Khasa	Himalayan		✓	✓	✓	✓	Khaśa (Vamana), Śaka (Brahmanda)
Kirāta	Himalayan	✓	✓	✓	✓	✓	Kirāta (Matsya, Central and Himalayan)
Kisaṇṇa	Central		✓				
Kiṣkindhaka (Kishkindhaka)	Vindhyan	✓	✓	✓	✓	✓	Kikarava (Vamana)
Koṅkaṇa	Southern					✓	
Kośala (Central)	Central	✓	✓	✓		✓	
Kośala (Vindhyan)	Vindhyan	✓	✓	✓	✓	✓	
Kukkuṭa	Northern				✓		
Kulūta	Northern				✓	✓	Ulūta (Brahmanda)
Kulya	Southern and Central	✓	✓	✓	✓	✓	Only Central in Markandeya; only Southern in Vamana and Brahmanda
Kumara	Southern	✓	✓	✓	✓	✓	Kupatha (Matsya), Kumana (Vayu), Kusuma (Markandeya), Kumārāda (Vamana), Kṣapaṇa (Brahmanda)
Kuninda	Northern	✓	✓	✓		✓	Pulinda (Matsya), Kaliṅga (Markandeya), Kalinda (Brahmanda)
Kuntala	Southern and Central	✓	✓	✓	✓	✓	Kuntala ( (Matsya, only Central), Kuṇḍala (Vamana)
Kupatha	Himalayan	✓	✓	✓	✓	✓	Kṣupaṇa (Vayu), Kurava (Markandeya)
Kuru	Central	✓	✓		✓	✓	Kaurava (Vamana)
Kuśalya (Kushalya)	Central					✓	
Kuśūdra (Kushudra)	Central				✓		
Kuthaprāvaraṇa	Himalayan	✓	✓	✓	✓	✓	Kuśaprāvaraṇa (Vayu), Kuntaprāvaraṇa (Markandeya), Apaprāvaraṇa (Brahmanda)
Lalhitta	Northern				✓		
Lampāka	Northern	✓	✓	✓	✓	✓	Lamaka (Brahmanda)
Madraka	Northern	✓	✓	✓	✓	✓	Bhadraka (Vayu and Vamana), Maṇḍala (Brahmanda)
Madguraka	Eastern	✓		✓	✓	✓	Mudgara (Markandeya), Mudagaraka (Brahmanda)
Mādreya	Central					✓	
Magadha	Eastern	✓	✓	✓	✓	✓	Central and Eastern in Vayu and Brahmanda
Maharāṣṭra (Maharashtra)	Southern	✓	✓	✓	✓	✓	Navarāṣṭra (Matsya)
Māheya	Western	✓	✓	✓	✓	✓	
Māhiṣika (Mahishika)	Southern	✓	✓	✓	✓	✓	Māhiṣaka (Vayu and Markandeya)
Mālada	Eastern	✓	✓	✓	✓	✓	Mālava (Matsya), Manada (Markandeya), Mansāda (Vamana)
Malaka	Central			✓			
Malavartika	Eastern	✓	✓	✓	✓	✓	Mallavarṇaka (Matsya), Mālavartin (Vayu), Mānavartika (Markandeya), Baladantika (Vamana)
Mālava	Vindhyan	✓	✓		✓	✓	Ekalavya (Vamana), Malada (Brahmanda)
Malla	Eastern	✓	✓	✓	✓	✓	Śālva (Matsya), Māla (Vayu), Māia (Vamana)
Maṇḍala	Himalayan	✓	✓	✓		✓	Mālava (Vayu), Mālava (Markandeya)
Māṇḍavya	Northern				✓		
Māṣa (Masha)	Vindhyan	✓					
Mātaṅga	Eastern	✓					
Matsya	Central	✓		✓	✓	✓	Yatstha (Vamana)
Maulika	Southern		✓	✓		✓	Maunika (Vayu)
Mekala	Vindhyan	✓	✓	✓	✓	✓	Rokala (Vayu), Kevala (Markandeya)
Arbuda	Western	✓	✓	✓	✓	✓	
Mūka	Central	✓					
Mūṣika (Mushika)	Southern	✓	✓	✓	✓	✓	Sūtika (Matsya), Mūṣikāda (Vamana), Mūṣika (Brahmanda)
Nairṇika	Southern		✓	✓	✓		Naiṣika (Markandeya)
Nalakālika	Southern		✓	✓	✓		Vanadāraka (Markandeya), Nalakāraka (Vamana)
Nāsikya	Western	✓	✓	✓	✓	✓	Vāsikya (Matsya), Nāsikānta (Vamana), Nāsika (Brahmanda)
Nirāhāra	Himalayan	✓	✓	✓	✓	✓	Nigarhara (Vayu), Nihāra (Markandeya)
Naiṣadha (Naishadha)	Vindhyan	✓	✓	✓	✓	✓	Niṣāda (Vayu)
Pahlava	Northern	✓	✓	✓	✓	✓	Pallava (all except Vayu)
Pāṇavīya	Northern				✓		
Pāñcala (Panchala)	Central	✓	✓		✓	✓	
Pāṇḍya (Pandya)	Southern	✓	✓	✓	✓	✓	Puṇḍra (Markandeya), Puṇḍra (Vamana)
Pārada	Northern	✓	✓	✓	✓	✓	Parita (Vayu), Pāravata (Vamana)
Paṭaccara (Patachchara)	Central	✓	✓			✓	Śatapatheśvara (Vayu)
Paurika	Southern		✓	✓	✓	✓	Paunika (Vayu), Paurika (Markandeya), Paurika (Vamana), Paurika (Brahmanda)
Pluṣṭa (Plushta)	Himalayan				✓		
Pragjyotisha	Eastern	✓	✓	✓	✓	✓	
Prasthala	Northern	✓	✓	✓	✓	✓	Puṣkala (Markandeya)
Pravaṅga	Eastern	✓	✓	✓	✓	✓	Plavaṅga (Matsya and Brahmanda)
Prāvijaya	Eastern	✓	✓	✓	✓	✓	Prāviṣeya (Brahmanda)
Priyalaukika	Northern		✓	✓	✓	✓	Harṣavardhana (Markandeya), Aṅgalaukika (Vamana), Aṅgalaukika (Brahmanda)
Puleya	Western	✓	✓	✓	✓	✓	Kulīya (Matsya), Pulinda (Markandeya), Pulīya (Vamana), Pauleya (Brahmanda)
Pulinda	Southern	✓	✓	✓		✓	
Puṇḍra	Eastern	✓	✓	✓	✓	✓	Muṇḍa (Vayu), Madra (Markandeya), Pṛsadhra (Vamana)
Rākṣasa (Rakshasa)	Southern				✓		
Rāmaṭha	Northern	✓	✓	✓	✓		Māṭhara (Markandeya), Māṭharodha (Vamana)
Rūpasa	Western	✓	✓	✓		✓	Kūpasa (Vayu), Rūpapa (Markandeya), Rūpaka (Brahmanda)
Sainika	Northern	✓	✓	✓		✓	Pidika (Vayu), Śūlika (Markandeya), Jhillika (Brahmanda)
Salva (Shalva)	Central	✓	✓			✓	
Saraja	Vindhyan			✓			
Sārasvata	Western	✓	✓	✓	✓	✓	
Sārika	Southern				✓		
Surāṣṭra (Surashtra)	Western	✓	✓	✓	✓	✓	Saurāṣṭra (Matsya)
Sauśalya (Saushalya)	Central					✓	
Sauvīra	Northern	✓	✓	✓	✓	✓	
Setuka	Southern	✓	✓	✓	✓	✓	Śailūṣa (Markandeya), Jānuka (Vamana)
Śabara (Shabara)	Southern	✓	✓	✓		✓	Bara (Vayu), Śarava (Brahmanda)
Śaka (Shaka)	Northern	✓	✓		✓	✓	Central in Vamana
Suhma	Eastern	✓	✓	✓	✓	✓	
Śaśikhādrika (Shashikhadraka)	Himalayan				✓		
Śatadruja (Shatadruja)	Northern			✓	✓		Śatadrava (Vamana)
Ṣaṭpura	Vindhyan	✓	✓	✓	✓	✓	Padgama (Matsya), Ṣaṭsura (Vayu), Paṭava (Markandeya), Bahela (Vamana)
Śulakara (Shulakara)	Northern			✓			
Śūrpāraka	Western		✓	✓	✓	✓	Sūrpāraka (Vayu), Sūryāraka (Markandeya), Sūryāraka (Brahmanda)
Sindhu	Northern	✓	✓	✓	✓	✓	
Sirāla	Western	✓	✓	✓	✓	✓	Surāla (Vayu), Sumīna (Markandeya), Sinīla (Vamana), Kirāta (Brahmanda)
Śudra (Shudra)	Northern	✓	✓	✓	✓	✓	Suhya (Brahmanda)
Sujaraka	Eastern		✓				
Supārśva (Suparshva)	Northern				✓		
Śūrasena (Shurasena)	Central	✓	✓			✓	
Taittrika	Western	✓	✓	✓	✓	✓	Taittirika (Matsya), Turasita (Vayu), Kurumini (Markandeya), Tubhamina (Vamana), Karīti (Brahmanda)
Talagana	Northern	✓	✓		✓	✓	Talagāna (Matsya), Stanapa (Vayu), Tāvakarāma (Vamana), Tālaśāla (Brahmanda)
Tāmasa	Himalayan	✓	✓	✓	✓	✓	Chamara (Matsya), Tomara (Vamana), Tāmara (Brahmanda)
Tāmas	Western				✓		
Tāmralipataka	Eastern	✓	✓	✓	✓	✓	
Taṅgaṇa	Himalayan	✓	✓	✓	✓	✓	Apatha (Matsya), Gurguṇa (Markandeya)
Taṅgaṇa	Northern		✓	✓	✓	✓	Tuṅgana (Markandeya)
Tāpasa	Western	✓	✓	✓	✓	✓	Svāpada (Markandeya), Tāpaka (Brahmanda)
Tilaṇga	Central		✓				
Tomara	Northern		✓	✓	✓	✓	Tāmasa (Markandeya and Vamana)
Tośala (Toshala)	Vindhyan	✓	✓	✓	✓	✓	
Traipura	Vindhyan	✓	✓	✓	✓	✓	
Trigarta	Himalayan	✓	✓	✓	✓	✓	
Tumbara	Vindhyan	✓	✓	✓	✓	✓	Tumbura (Vayu), Tumbula (Markandeya), Barbara (Brahmanda)
Tumura	Vindhyan	✓	✓	✓	✓	✓	Tumbura (Markandeya), Turaga (Vamana), Tuhuṇḍa (Brahmanda)
Tuṇḍikera	Vindhyan	✓	✓	✓	✓	✓	Śauṇḍikera (Matsya), Tuṣṭikāra (Markandeya)
Tūrṇapāda	Northern				✓		
Tuṣāra (Tushara)	Northern		✓	✓	✓	✓	Tukhāra (Markandeya)
Udbhida	Southern		✓	✓	✓	✓	Ulida (Vamana), Kulinda (Brahmanda)
Urṇa	Himalayan	✓	✓	✓	✓	✓	Huṇa (Vayu)
Utkala	Vindhyan	✓	✓	✓	✓	✓	Eastern and Central in Brahmanda
Uttamārṇa	Vindhyan		✓	✓	✓	✓	Uttama (Brahmanda)
Vāhyatodara	Northern		✓	✓	✓	✓	Girigahvara (Brahmanda)
Vanavāsika	Southern	✓	✓	✓	✓	✓	Vājivasika (Matsya), Banavāsika (Vayu), Namavāsika (Markandeya), Mahāśaka (Vamana)
Vaṅga	Eastern	✓			✓	✓	Central and Eastern in Vamana
Vāṅgeya	Eastern	✓	✓	✓	✓	✓	Mārgavageya (Matsya), Rāṅgeya (Markandeya), Vojñeya (Brahmanda)
Kāśī (Kashi)	Central	✓	✓	✓		✓	
Vāṭadhāna	Northern	✓	✓	✓	✓	✓	
Vatsa	Central		✓				
Vātsīya	Western				✓		
Vaidarbha	Southern	✓	✓	✓		✓	
Videha	Eastern	✓	✓	✓	✓	✓	
Vaidiśa (Vaidisha)	Vindhyan	✓	✓	✓	✓	✓	Vaidika (Vayu), Kholliśa (Vamana)
Vindhyamūlika	Southern	✓	✓	✓		✓	Vindhyapuṣika (Matsya), Vindhyaśaileya (Markandeya), Vindhyamaulīya (Brahmanda)
Vītihotra	Vindhyan	✓	✓	✓	✓	✓	Vīrahotra (Markandeya), Vītahotra (Vamana)
Vṛka	Central		✓	✓	✓		
Yamaka	Eastern	✓					
Yavana	Northern	✓	✓	✓	✓	✓	Gavala (Markandeya)

=== Sanskrit epics ===
The Bhishma Parva of the Mahabharata mentions around 230 janapadas, while the Ramayana mentions only a few of these. Unlike the Puranas, the Mahabharata does not specify any geographical divisions of ancient India, but does support the classification of certain janapadas as southern or northern.

=== Buddhist canon ===
The Buddhist canonical texts - Anguttara Nikaya, Digha Nikaya, Chulla-Niddesa, although with some differences between them, primarily refer to the following 16 mahajanapadas ("great janapadas"):

1. Anga
2. Assaka
3. Avanti
4. Chetiya
5. Gandhara
6. Kamboja
7. Kasi
8. Kosala
9. Kuru
10. Machchha
11. Magadha
12. Malla
13. Panchala
14. Surasena
15. Vajji (Bajji or Vṛji)
16. Vamsha (Vatsa)

=== Jain text ===
The Jain text Vyākhyāprajñapti or Bhagavati Sutra also mentions 16 important janapadas, but many names differ from the ones mentioned in the Buddhist texts.

1. Accha
2. Anga
3. Avaha
4. Bajji (Vajji or Vrijji)
5. Banga (Vanga)
6. Kasi (Kashi)
7. Kochcha
8. Kosala
9. Ladha (Lata)
10. Magadha
11. Malavaka
12. Malaya
13. Moli (Malla)
14. Padha
15. Sambhuttara
16. Vaccha (Vatsa)

== See also ==
- Rigvedic tribes
- Bharata Khanda
- History of India
- Mahajanapadas
- Middle kingdoms of India
- Monarchy in ancient India
- Indo-Aryan peoples
- List of ancient Indo-Aryan peoples and tribes
