= Kimpurusha kingdom =

Kingdom mentioned in the ancient Indian epic Mahabharata

Kimpurusha kingdom refers to the territory of a tribe called Kimpurushas who were one among the exotic tribes of ancient India. These exotic tribes lived in inaccessible regions like the Himalaya mountains.

Kimpurushas were described to be lion-headed beings. Splitting the word to Kimpurusha = Kim (Is it ? ) + Purusha (Man) (literally translated "Is it human ?"), analogous to the word Kin + Nara (Man), shows that Kinnaras and Kimpurushas were related or probably the same tribe. The lion head may be an exaggeration of their heavily bearded head. In some Puranas they were mentioned as horse-headed. They could be a tribe of horse-warriors like the Kambojas. But their lion-headed reference in the sources and them staying in the mountains suggest that they could be Kirata. Kirat-or Kirati- means people with lion nature. It is derived from two words Kira-Lion and Ti- people and it also means people from the mountain.

== References in Mahabharata ==
Kimpurushas were mentioned as half-lions and half-men at (1,66). Here they were mentioned as related to other exotic tribes like the Rakshasas, Vanaras, Kinnaras (half-men, half-horses) and Yakshas. Sage Pulaha was linked with the Kimpurushas, whereas the others were linked with the sage Pulastya. Another tribe viz the Valikhilyas (who follow the motion of the sun) were linked with the sage Kratu. Marichi, Angiras, Atri, Pulastya, Pulaha, and Kratu were mentioned as the six great sages, who probably originated the six great clans. The kinship of these exotic tribes is also mentioned at (12,206).

=== Arjuna's conquests ===
Arjuna, during his conquest of northern kingdoms also visited the Kimpurusha kingdom. Arjuna, Crossing the White mountains, subjugated the country of the Kimpurushas ruled by Durmaputra, after a collision involving a great slaughter of Kshatriyas, and brought the region under his complete sway. (2,27)

=== Kimpurusha King (or preceptor) Druma ===
- Druma is mentioned as the preceptor of the Kimpurushas at (2,43). Here he is said to attend the Rajasuya sacrifice of Pandava king Yudhishthira.
- Arjuna, had defeated the Kimpurusha king Durma-putra, during his military campaign in the northern regions (2,27)
- Rukmi a king of Vidarbha was a disciple of the famous Kimpurusha who was known by the name of Druma. (5,159)

=== Other References ===
Rakshasa Ravana defeated the Devas, the Danavas, the Gandharvas, the Yakshas, and the Kimpurushas. (3,279)

Kimpurushas used to wander in forests. (12,168)

== See also ==
- Kingdoms of Ancient India
- Kirat
- Kirata
- Kirata kingdom
- Kambojas
- Kamboja kingdom
- Kinnara kingdom
