= Nishadas =

Ancient Indian tribe

Nishada (niṣāda) is a tribe mentioned in ancient Indian literature (such as the epic Mahabharata). The ancient texts mention several kingdoms ruled by this tribe.

In the Mahabharata, the Nishadas are described as hunters, fishermen, mountaineers or raiders that have the hills and the forests as their abode. Their origin is associated with a king called Vena who became a slave to wrath and malice, and became unrighteous. Sages killed him for his malice and wrongdoings. Ekalavya is stated to be an archer of a Nishada tribe in the text. In the epic Ramayana, a king named Guha of the Nishada clan assists Rama during his period of exile.

== Identity ==
In the earliest of the Indo-Aryan texts, the term "Nishada" may have been used as a generic term for all indigenous non-Aryan tribes rather than a single tribe. This is suggested by the fact that according to Yaska's Nirukta, Aupamanyava explains the Rigveda term "pancha-janah" ("five peoples") as the four varnas of the Indo-Aryan society and the Nishadas.

Linguist S. K. Chatterji notes that the Nishadas appear to be different from the Dasas and the Dasyus, which are the other non-Aryan people mentioned in the Vedic texts. Historian Ramaprasad Chanda identifies the Nishadas as the original speakers of the Munda languages. N. K. Dutt also identifies with them pre-Dravidian peoples of India, who presumably spoke a language belonging to the Austroasiatic family, the parent family of the Munda languages.

The Nishadas are sometimes confused with the Nisadhas (IAST: Niṣādha), who were a distinct, Indo-Aryan tribe.

== Physical appearance ==
The Shanti Parva of the Mahabharata describes the Nishadas having dark skin colour similar to that of charred wood, black hair, blood red-coloured eyes, and short limbs. The later texts such as the Vishnu Purana and the Vayu Purana also emphasize the dark skin colour of the Nishadas. The Bhagavata Purana mentions the Nishadas as having copper-coloured hair, high cheekbones, and low-tipped nose.

== Occupation ==
Various ancient texts associate the Nishadas with hunting and fishing.

Nishadas are presented as hunters in the Bala Kanda of the Ramayana, Utpala's 8th century commentary on the Brihat Samhita, and the Dharmasutras of Vaikhanasa and Ushanas. The Adi Parva of the Mahabharata describes the Nishada prince Ekalavya as the son of an archer, which suggests that archery was a hereditary trait of the Nishadas.

The Manusmriti and the Anushasana Parva of the Mahabharata mention fishing as the profession of the Nishadas. The Vishnu Smriti also seems to consider subsistence on fishing a characteristic of the Nishadas, as attested by Nanda-pandita's commentary on the text and the Katha-sarit-sagara.

The Raghuvamsha presents the Nishada as boatmen. The Ayodhya Kanda of the Ramayana, which mentions the Nishada as the name of an occupational caste (jāti), states that the Nishada king helped Rama cross the Ganges River. The Harivamsha states that the Nishadas collected gems and jewels from the river beds.

Maskarin's commentary on Gautama Dharmasutra suggests that elephant-training was another occupation associated with the Nishadas. This is also corroborated the use of the term "Nishadin" to describe an elephant-keeper in Bana's Harsha-charita and Magha's Shishupala-vadha.

Several ancient texts present the Nishadas as progeny of parents from different occupational classes, called the varnas (see Social status section below). However, such classifications are not indicative of the contemporary occupations of the Nishadas: rather, they appear to be a legal attempt to define the status of the Nishadas relative to the other varnas, so that the varna-specific laws could be applied to them.

== Relations with the early Indo-Aryans ==
The Nishadas appear to have been among the first indigenous tribes encountered by the Indo-Aryans in India. Most of the other indigenous tribes find few mentions in the Vedic texts. The Nishadas appear in these texts several times, and as a full-fledged tribe within the Indo-Aryan social framework.

Aitareya Brahmana, an early text, describes the Nishadas as raiders operating in the forests. However, the later Shrauta texts suggest that they were gradually assimilated into the Indo-Aryan society, and were not considered as untouchable at this time. For example:

- The Apastamba-Shrauta-Sutra and the Latyayana-Shrauta-Sutra indicate that the Nishadas lived in villages: the performance of the Vishvajit Vedic ritual sacrifice required the performer to live with the Nishadas for three nights, and share their food.
- The Shrauta-Sutras of Apastamba, Katyayana, and Varaha, mention the participation of Nishadas in a sacrificial ceremony: A Nishada official (sthapati) makes offerings to fire to propitiate the deity Rudra, although this ceremony does not involving chanting of the Vedic mantras.
- The Manava-Shrauta-Sutra explicitly prescribes a Shrauta (Vedic) sacrifice for a Nishada chief.
- The Satyashadha-Shrauta-Sutra mentions a Nishada (a Nishada chief according to a commentary) in connection with the agnihotra and darsha-purna-masa rituals.
- The Purva-Mimamsa-Sutra of Jaimini discusses if the Nishada sthapati involved in the above-mentioned rituals should be a tribal chief or a person from one of the three higher varnas ("traivarnika"). It concludes that the sthapati should be a tribal chief.
- The Shatapatha Brahmana mentions them among the groups whom the Vedic priests taught Itihasa, the Atharvaveda, the art of snake-charming (sarpa-vidya), and demonology (deva-jana-vidya). The other groups included the Asuras, the Gandharvas, the selagas (possibly robbers or thieves), the snake-charmers, the bird-catchers etc.

These references suggest that the Indo-Aryans made efforts to assimilate the Nishadas into their own social order, but the Vedic ritual status granted to the Nishadas was limited in nature. Historian Ramaprasad Chanda speculates that the Nishadas were too numerous and too powerful to be eliminated, enslaved, or expelled by the Indo-Aryans: this may explain the limited attempts to assimilate them.

It is possible that only the high-class among the Nishadas were inducted into the Indo-Aryan society, while the majority of them remained unassimilated. Panini's Ganapatha mentions a gotra called Nishada, which according to scholar D. D. Kosambi, suggests that some tribal priests were assimilated as Brahmanas in the Indo-Aryan society.

== Social status ==
The Rudra Adhyaya of the ancient Yajurveda Samhita shows reverence to the Nishadas, among others.

Nevertheless, the Nishadas held a low status in the Indo-Aryan society:

- Yaska's Nirukta excludes the Nishadas from the four varnas of the Indo-Aryan society, quoting Aupamanyava. The text explains the meaning of the word "Nishada" as a being in whom "sin or evil sits down".
- Baudhayana Dharmasutra and Arthashastra state that a Brahmana's son from a Shudra woman should inherit one-tenth of his father's property. Both these texts describe Nishadas as progeny of Brahmana men and Shudra women, but do not apply the inheritance rule to the Nishadas. The Baudhayana Dharmasutra states that a Nishada son should not receive any inheritance, while the Arthashastra allows only a maintenance for a Nishada son.
- The Shanti Parva of the Mahabharata states that the Nishada originated from the pierced thigh of the tyrant king Vena.

In what appears to be an attempt to define the status of the Nishadas in the varna system, several ancient texts present them as progeny of parents from different varnas. This appears to have been done for legal purposes, since a person's varna status determined how the contemporary law treated them. For example:

- Multiple sources describe the Nishadas as the children of Brahmana men and their Shudra wives. These texts include Baudhayana Dharmasutra, Arthashastra, Vashistha Dharmasutra, Manusmriti, Yajnavalkya Smriti, and the Anushasana Parva (48.5) of Mahabharata.
- Gautama, according to his commentators Maskarin and Haradatta, describes the Nishadas as the progeny of a Brahmana father and a Vaishya mother.
- The Anushasana Parva (48.12) and the Naradasmriti describe the Nishadas as of mixed Kshatriya and Shudra parentage.

Gradually, the Nishadas were relegated to the status of untouchables in the Indo-Aryan society.

== Description in Ramayana ==
The main profession of Nishadas was fishing and hunting. According to one telling, once, a Nishada had killed one bird from a pair, causing the other bird to be aggrieved by its loss and experience the pangs of pain. Observing this deep pain inspired the sage Valmiki to write about the legend of king Rama of Ayodhya and his dutiful wife queen Sita, who lived in separation due to her capture by the rakshasa king Ravana. In the Ramayana, the king of the Nishadas, named Guha, is stated to be an ally of Rama. He helps Rama and Sita to cross the Ganges river near Shringiverapura.

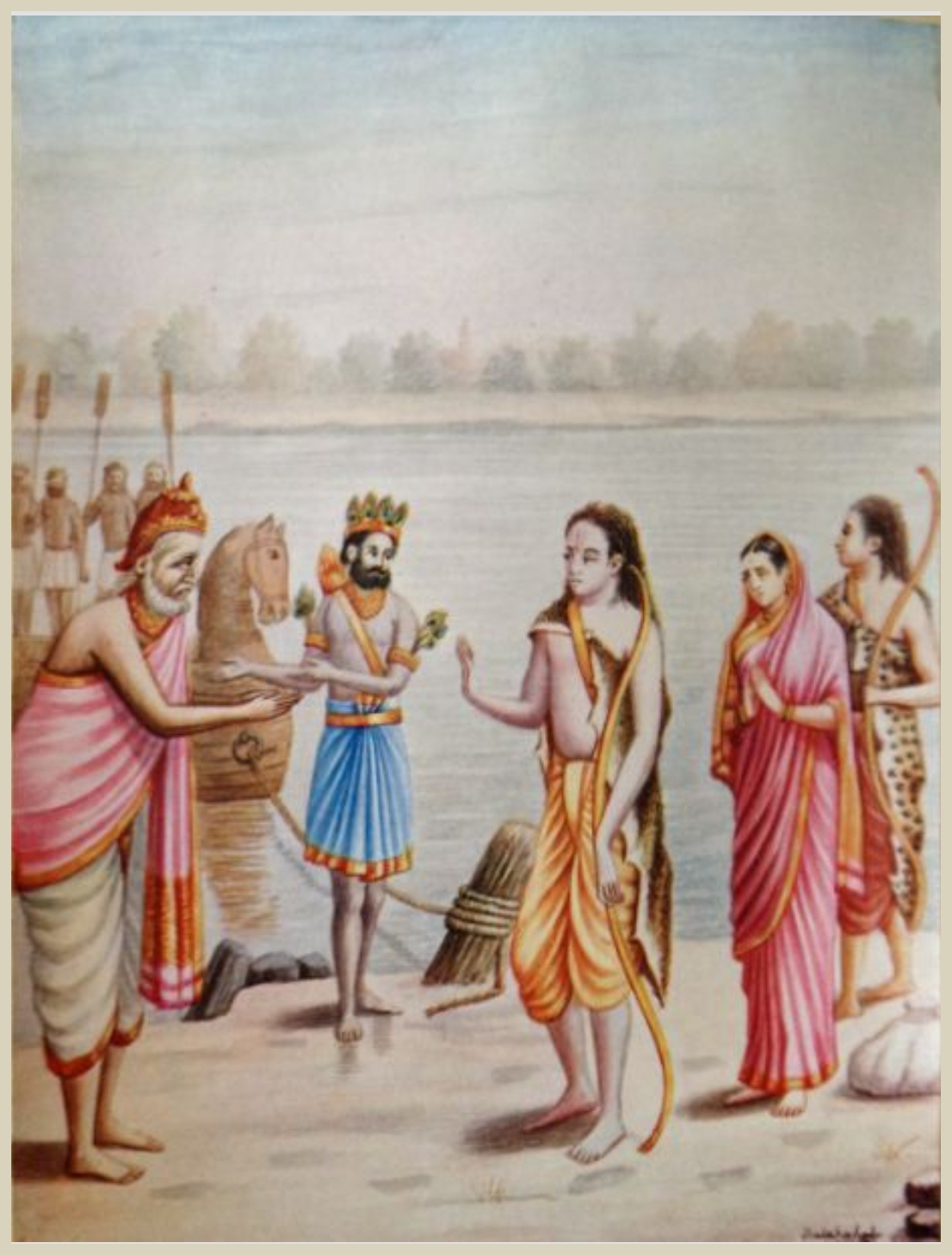
Painting of Guha helping Rama to cross the river Ganga

== References in Mahabharata ==
The Mahabharata speaks of Nishaada as forest hunters and fishermen. Nishadas were mentioned as tribes that have the hills and the forests for their abode and fishing as their chief occupation. They ruled over the hills, plains, land and dominated over the water. They were linked with a king called Vena (see Saraswata kingdom) (12,58). Nishadas lived in hamlets (12,328).

Aushmikas, and Nishadas, and Romakas were mentioned as bringing tribute to king Yudhishthira during his Rajasuya sacrifice (2,50).

=== Nishada kingdom of Ekalavya ===
Ekalavya was the son of Hiranyadhanus, king of the Nishadas (1,134). He came to Hastinapura to join the military school of Drona. Ekalavya's kingdom was the most famous Nishada kingdom during the time of the Pandavas. This kingdom was visited by Sahadeva during his military campaign to the south, to collect tribute for Yudhishthira's Rajasuya sacrifice;- Sahadeva, the Kuru warrior, conquered the country of the Nishadas and also the high hill called Gosringa, and that lord of earth called Srenimat (2,30). Nishada and Srenimat were mentioned together again at (5,4).

Ekalavya, the king of the Nishadas, always used to challenge Vasudeva Krishna to battle; but he was slain by Krishna in battle (5,48), (7-178,179) (16,6).

Arjuna had come to Nishada kingdom of Ekalavya, after the Kurukshetra War, to collect tribute for Yudhishthira's Ashwamedha sacrifice.

Arjuna proceeded to the dominions of the Nishada king, viz., the son of Ekalavya. The son of Ekalavya received Arjuna in battle. The encounter that took place between the Kuru hero and the Nishadas was furious. Unvanquished in battle, the valiant son of Kunti defeated the Nishada king who proved an obstacle to the sacrifice. Having subjugated the son of Ekalavya, he proceeded towards the southern ocean. (14,83).

=== Nishadas on the banks of Saraswati ===
A spot named Vinasana on the banks of Sarasvati River is mentioned as the gate to the kingdom of the Nishadas. There the river is completely dried up and exist as a dry river channel (3,130). Pandavas were led to this place by their guide viz sage Lomasa, during their pilgrimage all over India.

=== Nishada kingdom in the South India ===
This kingdom was visited by Sahadeva during his military campaign to the south, to collect tribute for Yudhishthira's Rajasuya sacrifice;- After defeating the Dandakas (Aurangabad, Maharashtra) the Kuru warrior, Sahadeva vanquished and brought under his subjection numberless kings of the Mlechchha tribe living on the sea coast, and the Nishadas and the cannibals and even the Karnapravarnas, and those tribes also called the Kalamukhas (2,30).

This Nishada's battled for the sake of Pandavas in the Kurukshetra War: The Dravida, the Andhaka, and the Nishada foot-soldiers, urged on by Satyaki, once more rushed towards Karna in that battle (Kurukshetra War) (8,49).

=== Nishada kingdom of Manimat ===
Manimat had his kingdom to the south of Kosala. This kingdom was visited by Bhima during his military campaign to the east, to collect tribute for Yudhishthira's Rajasuya sacrifice;- After conquering Vatsabhumi Bhima defeated the king of the Bhargas, as also the ruler of the Nishadas viz Manimat and numerous other kings (2,29). This kingdom is possibly the Jaunpur district of Uttar Pradesh. The famous Nishada king named Guha who befriended the Kosala prince Raghava Rama was also the king of this kingdom.

=== Nishada kingdom close to Kalinga and Vanga ===
A prince named Ketumat is mentioned as battling along with the Kalingas against Bhima, in the Kurukshetra War. He was mentioned as the son of the Nishada king. He could be the son of Manimat the Nishada king, who was defeated formerly by Bhima. Ketumat was slain by Bhima along with the Kalinga heroes (6,54).

The Kalinga, the Vanga, and the Nishada heroes, riding on elephants were said to attack Arjuna in Kurukshetra War (8,17).

Mekalas (a kingdom close to Dakshina Kosala kingdom, in Chathisgad) and Utkalas (western Orissa), and Kalingas, and Nishadas and Tamraliptakas (south of West Bengal), were mentioned as advancing against Nakula (8,22). The Kalingas, the Vangas, the Angas, the Nishadas and the Magadhas were mentioned together on the Kaurava side at (8,70).

=== Nishadas in Kurukshetra War ===
==== On Pandava side ====
Nishadas were mentioned as battling for the sake of Pandavas along with the Pauravakas and Patachcharas; at(6,50). The southern Nishadas were also mentioned in the army of Pandavas (8,49).

==== On Kaurava side ====
Nishada prince Ketumat was mentioned who was slain by Bhima along with the Kalinga heroes (6,54). Nishada army was mentioned to fight for the sake of Kauravas at various instances (6-118), (7,44), (8-17,20,22,60,70). Bhima is said to slay a Nishada prince (other than Ketumat) at (8,60).

=== A mountain range named Nishada ===
A mountain range in ancient India is named Nishada, mentioned along with other mountains like Meru, Mahendra, Malaya, Sweta, Sringavat, Mandara, Nila Dardurna, Chitrakuta, Anjanabha, the Gandhamadana mountains and the sacred Somagiri (13,165).

=== Other references ===
- Swords of excellent quality were manufactured in the country of the Nishadas. Pandavas possessed such swords (2,42).
- The Utpalas, the Mekalas, the Paundras, the Kalingas, the Andhras, the Nishadas etc. were mentioned as defeated by Karna (7,4).
- The story of a robber of the name of Kayavya, born of a Kshatriya father and a Nishada mother is mentioned at (12,134).
- In a remote region in the midst of the ocean, the Nishadas have their fair home (1,28).
- Nishada king is equated with an Asura tribe called Krodhavardhana (1,67)

== See also ==
- Kingdoms of Ancient India
