= Saraswata kingdom =

The Saraswata kingdom was an ancient kingdom, territory, or region on the banks of the Sarasvati River during the pre-historic ages. This region is mentioned in detail in as many as 20 chapters in the Mahabharata from (9:35) to (9:54). Balarama traced the Saraswati river through its partially dried up course from the ocean near Prabhasa (close to Dwaraka) to its origin in the Himalayas.

== Mahabharata ==
The regions called Saraswata on the banks of Saraswati River are mentioned at (3:83, 84).

=== Saraswata kings ===
Saraswata kings are mentioned as performing a sacrifice (3:129) at Plakshavatarana, a place on the banks of the Sarasvati at its origin from the Himalayas. This place is to the north of Kurukshetra in Haryana. The Saraswata sacrifice is mentioned again at (3:90) as being performed at Plakshavatarana. King Yayati had also constructed many sacrificial fire-altars here.

According to Adi parva of Mahabharata (1.90.25-26), it is mentioned that "King Matinara performed yagya (sacrifice) in Fire altars at the bank of sarasvati river". Kalibangan is a town located on the left or southern banks of the Ghaggar (Ghaggar-Hakra River), identified with the Sarasvati river. At Kalibangan fire Vedi (altar)s have been discovered similar to those found at Lothal. This lonely structure may perhaps have been used for ritual purposes.

=== King Prithu, the son of Vena ===
King Prithu is mentioned as having Saraswatas for his companions. (12:58)

King Prithu was the son of King Vena, in the line of Kardama. His lineage is described at (12:58) as follows: Virajas – Krittimat – Kardama – Ananga – Ativala – Vena. Descendants of Vena became the Nishadas who established themselves close to the Saraswati valley (in Rajasthan to the north of Anarta kingdom in Gujarat). Those tribes that had the hills and the forests for their abode and practiced fishing and hunting as their chief occupation, as also those hundreds and thousands of others called the Mlecchhas, residing on the Vindhya mountains were all the descendants of Vena. However Prithu became a great king. Clad in mail, armed with scimitars, bows and arrows, and well-versed in the science of weapons, he was fully acquainted with the Vedas and their branches. Sukra, the great scholar of Brahma-knowledge, became his priest. The Valakhilyas became his counsellors, and the Saraswatas his companions. The great and illustrious Rishi Garga became his astrologer (12:58).

Prithu, the royal son of Vena, gave unto the Sutas the lands lying on the eastern sea-coast (Anga and Vanga), and unto the Magadhas the country since known as Magadha. Sutas and Magadhas were till then bards and panegyrists in royal courts. Prithu made the land levelled for making roads. Vena’s son removed the rocks and rocky masses lying all around. He cultivated 17 kinds of crops for producing food (12:58).

=== The Battle-ground of ancient wars ===
Saraswati valley seems to have witnessed the clashes of many ancient tribes (most times mentioned as Devas and Asuras but originally Kshatriya-like tribes). It was the origin of Hindu traditions and scriptures

On the banks of the Saraswati River was a place called Aditya. Here Varuna the son of Aditi had performed a great Rajasuya yagna. Upon the commencement of that foremost of sacrifices, a battle ensued between the Devas and the Danavas (who were mentioned here as Kshatriyas (9:49)). It is mentioned as the place where all the Devas, the Vishwadevas, the Maruts, the Gandharvas, the Apsaras, the Yakshas, the Rakshasas, and the Pisachas could be seen (9:49). Here Vishnu himself, having in days of yore slain the Asuras, Madhu and Kaitabha, had performed his ablutions (9:49). Another place on the banks of the Saraswati River called Soma, is mentioned as the place where King Soma performed his Rajasuya sacrifice. Here a great battle was fought in which Taraka was the enemy (9:51).

The island-born sage (Vyasa) also having bathed in this place, obtained great Yogic powers and attained great success. Endowed with great ascetic merit, the Sage Asita-Devala also, having bathed in that very Tirtha with his soul rapt in high Yoga meditation, obtained great Yogic powers (9:49).

These passages are from the narration of Yadava Balarama's pilgrimage along the ancient river Saraswati. Saraswati was partially dried up then. It disappeared into the desert and only the dried river bed can be seen after a place called Vinasana. See Sudra Kingdom for more details.

=== Sage Saraswata, the drought and the Vedas ===
Saraswati valley was the seat of Vedas (knowledge) and Vedic traditions. It was for this reason that the river Saraswati was later considered as the goddess of knowledge. At (9:51) we found mention of the decline of Vedic culture due to the drying up of Saraswati River and its revival by a sage belonging to the same region.

There (in a place called Soma on the banks of Saraswati River), during a drought extending for twelve years, the Sage Saraswata, in former days, taught the Vedas unto many foremost of Brahmanas (9:51).

Saraswata was born to family of sage brighu, his father was sage (some time prince) dhadichi (not one who donate his bones). In battle 99 heroes in the army of the Daityas, (a clan of Asuras) were slain. After this great war there was a drought extending for 12 years. During that drought extending for twelve years, the great sages (who practiced Vedic traditions and who were settled on the banks of Saraswati River) for the sake of sustenance, migrated from the river valley (9:51). However, Sage Saraswata continued to live on the banks of the Saraswati.

After the drought of 12 years had died, the great sages solicited one another for lectures on the Vedas. While wandering with famished stomachs, the sages had lost the knowledge of the Vedas. There was, indeed, not one amongst them that could understand the scriptures. It chanced that someone amongst them encountered Saraswata, that foremost of sages, while the latter was reading the Vedas with concentrated attention. Coming back to the conclave of rishis, he spoke to them of Saraswata, of unrivalled splendour and god-like form engaged in reading the Vedas in a solitary forest. Then all the great Rishis came to that spot, and jointly asked him to teach them the Vedas. Those sages duly became his disciples and obtaining from him their knowledge of the Vedas, once more began to practice their rites. A total of 60,000 sages became disciples of the venerable Rishi Saraswata for the sake of acquiring their knowledge of the Vedas from him (9:51). The present day Saraswat Brahmins who are Saraswats in Rajasthan, kashmiri pandits, punjabi brahmins, Goud saraswat brahmins, Shenvis, Chitrapur saraswats, bhalvalikar, Rajapur Saraswats, and pednekars, have this event as part of their culture.

This event is repeated again at (3:85): At the forest of Tungaka in olden days sage Saraswata taught the Vedas to the ascetics. When the Vedas had been lost in consequence of the sages having forgotten them. Here (3:85) he is mentioned as the son of Angirasa. The asylum of Aditya, the place of Soma and the hermitage of Dadhichi were mentioned as adjacent places on the banks of Saraswati at (3:83). Here it is mentioned that Angirasa – a great sage belonging to the Saraswata race. At (13:50) Saraswata is sometimes mentioned as Sage Atri’s son. Saraswata is mentioned as a sage from the western regions of India at (12:207, 13:165).

=== Saraswatas in the Kurukshetra War ===
Nakula the son of Madri, hath intended to take as his share the deceitful Uluka.

==== Post-Mausala Parva ====
After the Mausala Parva, which claims the lives of almost all Yadavas, the Pandavas bring the survivors with them.

== See also ==
- Kingdoms of Ancient India
- Kurukshetra
- Abhira kingdom
- Nishada kingdom
- Sarasvati River
