= Guha (Ramayana) =

Ramayana character

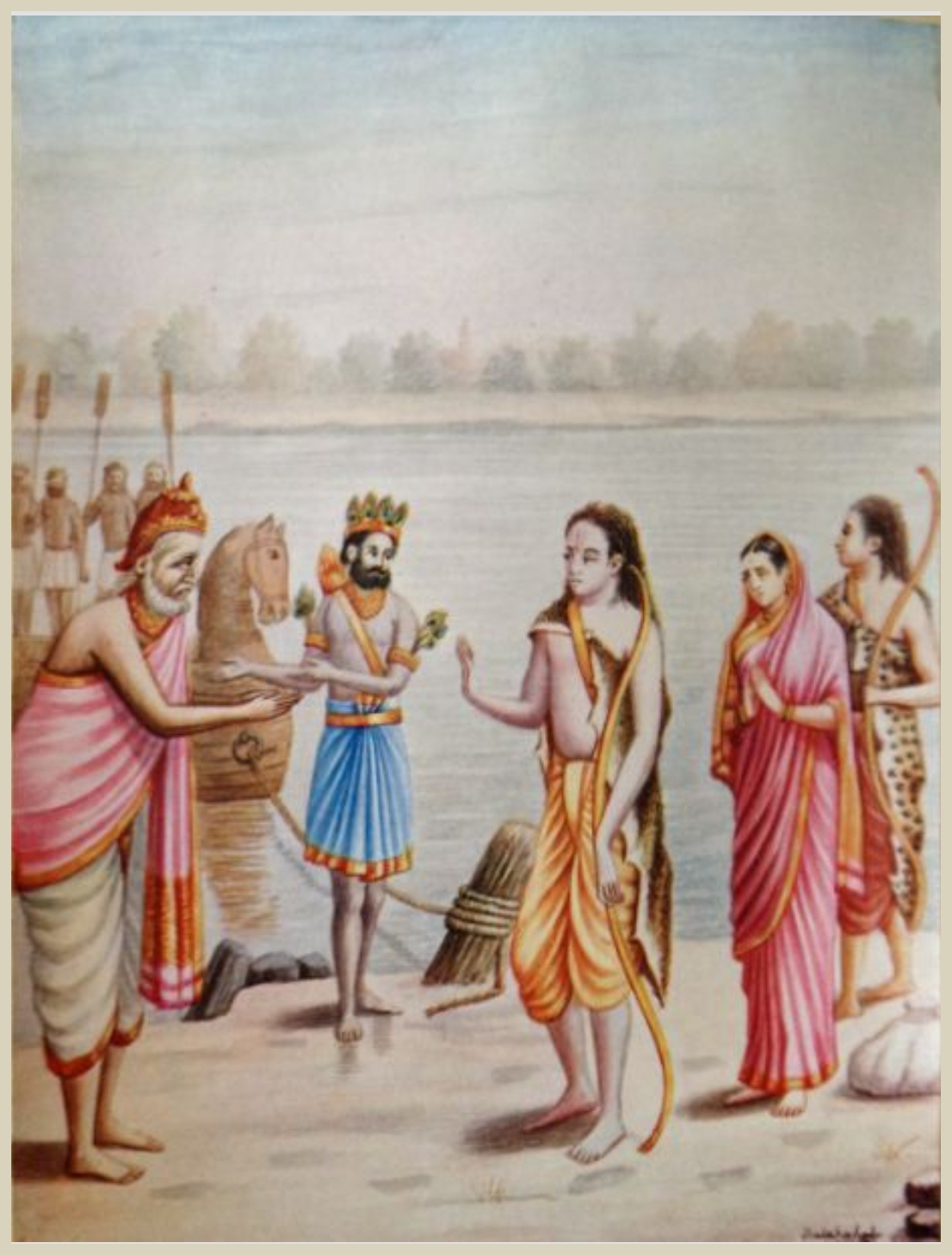
- Painting of Guha offering to help Rama, Sita and Lakshmana to cross the Ganga river
- Affiliation: Nishada, Rama
- Texts: Ramayana
- Region: Śṛṅgiverapura

Guha (Sanskrit: गुह, romanized: Guha) was the king of Śṛṅgiverapura, the nation of the Nishadas, in the Hindu epic Ramayana. Guha was Rama's first ally in latter's exile.

Guha is known for arranging the boat and helmsmen who ferried Rama, Lakshmana, and Sita across the river Ganga in the Ayodhya Kanda. Later in the same Kanda spotting from a distance Bharata's army approaching and being unsure of his intentions, Guha commanded his Dasa army troops to take positions along the banks of the river Ganga, and his naval army troops of kaivartas to keep vigil with five hundred boats, each manned by one hundred young men.

== Legend ==
During the beginning of their exile from Ayodhya, Rama, Lakshmana, and Sita arrived at the banks of the river Ganga, accompanied by Sumantra, a minister at Dasharatha's court. The boatmen who witnessed the royal chariot that had brought them carried these tidings to Guha, who quickly learnt the identities of the newcomers. He rushed to welcome the prince, offering him and his family food and drink of their choice, excellent beds, and all the hospitality that could be offered. Rama declined these offers, stating that he was presently leading the life of an ascetic. Hence, he opted to drink only the water of the Ganga, and slept under a tree. In the morning, after his prayers, he requested Guha to have someone ferry them across the river, bidding him farewell. Guha, in a clever manner, convinced Rama to have his holy feet washed by him before he boarded the boat, citing his supposed worry that the boat could be transformed into a woman, since he had heard their potency from the story of Ahalya. After ferrying the trio across the river, he bid them farewell, even as Rama appreciated his bhakti towards him.

In the Ramacharitamanasa, Guha accompanied Rama, Sita, and Lakshmana till sage Bharadvaja's hermitage after crossing the Ganga, and was sent back before they started walking towards sage Valmiki's hermitage.

In the Kamba Ramayanam, Guha watched over Rama during his stay in his village, staying awake throughout the night. Rama praised him as his own brother, promising to visit him again.

When Bharata refused to ascend the throne after the demise of Dasharatha, he proceeded to search for Rama. His army and he soon arrived at Śṛṅgiverapura, where he offered his respects at the banks of the Ganga for the peace of his father's soul. Guha observed the banner of Bharata, reaching the conclusion that the prince intended to kill them, and harm Rama. He set out to meet Bharata. Sumantra identified Guha as he arrived, and alerted the prince. Guha offered Bharata his customary respects, and when he was enquired regarding the path Rama had taken, he confessed his anxiety. Bharata assured Guha that he wished to bring Rama back to Ayodhya. Relieved, the king pointed Bharata in the right direction, and informed him about the austere lifestyle his brother had chosen to undertake during his exile.
