= Rakshasa kingdom =

In Hinduism, Rakshasa kingdom refers to the territory of Rakshasas who were a tribe, mentioned along with others like Devas (including Rudras, Maruts, Vasus and Adityas), Asuras (including Daityas, Danavas and Kalakeyas), Pisachas, Gandharvas, Kimpurushas, Vanaras, Suparnas, Kinnaras, Bhutas and Yakshas. Rakshasas were described to have large bodies, probably due to their continuous life in cold climates over snow-covered mountains. The forefathers of the famous Rakshasa king Ravana lived along with the Yakshas. The Yaksha king Kubera was the elder brother of Rakshasa king Ravana. Ravana had many sons among Gandharva wives. The two epics Mahabharata and Ramayana and many Puranas attest that Rakshasas, Yakshas and Gandharvas were related and had inter-marriages.

== References in the Ramayana and the Mahabharata ==
=== Kingdom of Ravana ===
Ravana was the most famous Rakshasa who ruled from the Trikuta mountains of Lanka where the climatic conditions were similar to Himalayas. Many Rakshasas like Khara ruled under Ravana, at different places in ancient Indian mainland. Khara's kingdom was in south-central India, in a dense forest named Dandaka.

=== Kingdom of Ghatotkacha ===
Ghatotkacha was a Rakshasa born of the Pandava Bhima and the Rakshasa woman Hidimbi. Rakshasa Ghatotkacha's kingdom, Kamyaka Forest, was near the Kuru kingdom.Ghatotkacha and his kingdom participated in the Kurukshetra War. In Bhishma's judgment, Ghatotkacha was a leader of the leaders of car-divisions (5:173). Ghatotkacha fought against other Rakshasa tribes on the side of the Kauravas. Alambusa and Alayudha were the main Rakshasa opponents of Ghatotkacha (7:1715) and were slain by him during the night war on the fourteenth day of the war. Ghatotkacha's son Anjanaparvan was slain by Ashwatthama. Ghatotkacha was slain by Karna.

== See also ==
- Kingdoms of Ancient India
- Lanka kingdom
- Danda kingdom
- Kishkindha kingdom
- Gandharva kingdom
- Danda kingdom
