= Andhras =

Ancient non-Aryan tribe

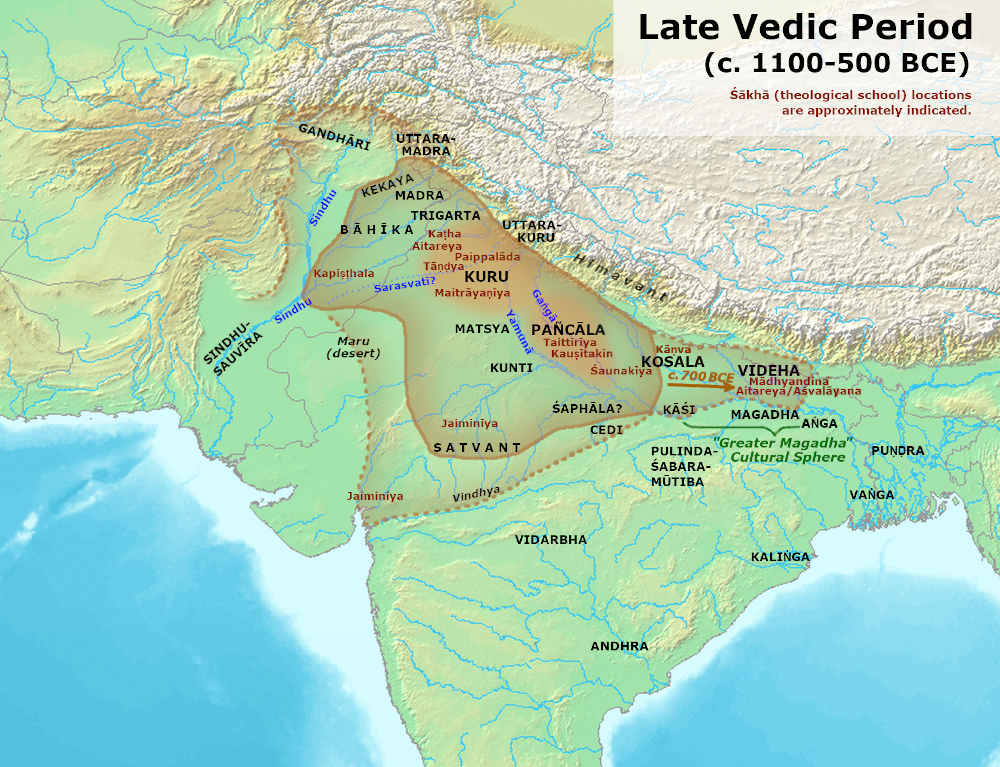
Āndhra during the late-Vedic period

The Āndhras were an ancient non-Aryan tribe of south-central Indian subcontinent, whose existence is attested during the Bronze Age. The Eastern Deccan region inhabited by Andhras was called Andhradesa. The modern Indian state of Andhra Pradesh derives its name from this historic tribe and region.

Andhras were mentioned in Aitareya Brahmana of the Rigveda (c. 800 BCE) as the exiled sons of the Sage Vishvamitra. In the Mahabharata, the infantry led by Satyaki were said to belong to the Andhra tribe. These combatants were described as being decked with ornaments, possessed of red teeth, and endued with the prowess of infuriated elephants. Attired in robes of diverse colours and smeared with powdered scents, they were armed with swords and nooses, capable of restraining mighty elephants, and remained companions in death who never deserted one another. Equipped with quivers and bearing bows, these warriors were characterised by their long locks, agreeable speech, fierce forms, and great energy. Andhras were also mentioned in the Bhagavata, Vayu, Skanda, Markandeya and Matsya Puranas. Buddhist references to Andhras are also found.

Greek historian Megasthenes, in his Indica (c. 310 BCE), described the Andhras as a distinct race living in the Krishna and Godavari river deltas. They were famous for their military strength, which was second only to that of the Mauryans in all of Indian subcontinent. They had 30 fortified towns, an army of 100,000 infantry, 2,000 cavalry and 1,000 elephants. They were also mentioned at the time of the death of the Mauryan Emperor Ashoka in 232 BCE. The Satavahanas were referred to as the Andhras, Andhra-bhṛtyas or Andhra-jatiyas in the Puranas.

== Location ==
The Andhras lived in the fertile deltas formed by the Krishna and Godavari rivers. These rivers, which carried large amounts of silt, created expansive and nutrient rich floodplains that enhanced the fertility of the surrounding land. Kolleru Lake, located between the two river deltas, played a vital role in the region's ecology and historical development. The deltaic zone, with its exceptionally rich alluvial soil—regarded as among the most fertile in the world and abundant water resources, supported a thriving agrarian economy and facilitated the growth of prosperous towns and cities. The political centre of the Andhras was Andhapura.

== Harappan heritage ==
Epigraphical and linguistic research has proposed a significant link between the ancient Andhras and the Indus Valley Civilisation (IVC). According to the research, the name "Andhra" has a deep-rooted Dravidian etymology that predates its later Sanskritisation in Vedic literature. A total of 9 words occurring as names or titles in Early Andhra history have been identified from the Indus Script as derived directly from the Indus Civilisation. The words can be classified as follows:

Dravidian Grammatical Morphemes: The foundational linguistic building blocks preserved from the Indus Civilisation include the roots -(a)nṟ, -(a)mpu, and -ar / -ir.

Loanwords from Dravidian to Indo-Aryan: The regional name Andhra itself is identified as a Sanskritised loanword derived from the Dravidian root -(a)nṟ. In Old Telugu/Proto-Dravidian, this root signifies "man" or "warrior".

Hybrids of Loanwords and Loan Translations: Terms such as āndhra-bhṛtya and āndhra-jāti combine original Dravidian roots with later Indo-Aryan social and administrative classifications. Specifically, āndhra-bhṛtya is derived from the Harappan JAR-MAN signs (-anṟ- aṇ), meaning "one subordinate to another person". āndhra-jāti corresponds to the JAR-HARROW signs (-anṟ-kuṭi), meaning "one who is a tenant or tiller under another person".

Loan Translations from Dravidian to Indo-Aryan: Key historical titles and dynastic names are interpreted as Indo-Aryan translations of original Dravidian concepts derived from Harappan signs:

- Sātakarṇi: Derived from the JAR (with handles) sign, representing sata-karṇa (ears of sacrificial vessel).
- Sātavāhana: Derived from the JAR-BEARER signs, representing sata-vahana (jar-bearing), which translates to "food-bearer".
- Sālivāhana: Derived from the ARROW-BEARER signs, representing śalya-vahana (arrow-bearing), which translates to "arms-bearer".

This research suggests that the Andhras were a prominent non-Aryan group that migrated from the Indus Valley following its decline, carrying their cultural and linguistic identity into the Deccan. The descriptions in the Aitareya Brahmana, which classify the Andhras as Dasyus or Mlecchas, fall in line with research characterising the tribe as non-Aryan.

== Hindu texts ==
=== Rigveda ===
According to Aitareya Brahmana of the Rigveda, the sage Vishvamitra had hundred sons; fifty of them were older than Madhuchhanda, and fifty were younger. The older ones were not pleased with (the installation of Sunahsepa to the primogeniture). Visvamitra then pronounced against them a curse: “You shall have the lowest castes for your descendants. ” Therefore, are many of the most degraded classes of men, the rabble for the most part, such as the Andhras, Pundras, Sabaras, Palindas, and Mutibas, descendants of Visvamitra....” All of those tribes are referred to as Dasyus, or non-Aryans living on the fringes of Aryan settlements.

Historian E. J. Rapson notes that while Andhras were classified as 'outcasts' in the Brahmana, they likely remained non-Aryan in blood and speech during this period, even as they were being integrated into the broader Indian political landscape.

=== Ramayana ===
The Ramayana connects the Andhras tribe with the Godavari region.

Nadlm Godavarlm caiva sarvamevanupa^yatah
Tathaivandhramsca PundramSca cotan Pandramscaveratan
— Ram. Kish. Kan. 41 chap. 12.

=== Mahabharata ===
- In the Karna Parva of the Mahabharata, the infantry of the Yadava chieftain Satyaki was said to be composed of the Andhra tribe, who were known for their long hair, tall stature, sweet language, and mighty prowess. These combatants were decked with ornaments, possessed red teeth, and were endued with the prowess of infuriated elephants. Attired in robes of diverse colours and smeared with powdered scents, they were armed with swords and nooses, capable of restraining mighty elephants, and remained companions even in death, never deserting one another. Equipped with quivers and bearing bows, these warriors of the Andhra tribe were characterized by their long locks, agreeable speech, fierce forms, and great energy.
- The Mahabharata (Mbh 6.9) lists the Andhras among other notable tribes of the time: "...the Kutas, the Maheyas, the Kakshas, the Samudranishkutas; the Andhras...
- During his southern military campaign, Sahadeva subdued the Andhras, Dravidas, and other southern tribes (Mbh 2.30). Later, Arjuna also encountered and subjugated the Andhras and Mahishakas during his post-Kurukshetra War conquest (Mbh 14.83).
- The Andhras, along with the Kalingas, were among the tribes subdued by Karna during his southern conquest (Mbh 7.4).
- Krishna is recorded as the slayer of Chanura of the Andhra country (Mbh 13.149).
- The Andhras participated in Yudhishthira's Rajasuya Yajna alongside several prominent kingdoms, signifying their royal stature (Mbh 2.33).
- Alliances in the War:
  - As Pandava Allies: The Andhras, alongside the Dravidas and Kuntalas, were mentioned as part of the alliance supporting the Pandavas in the conversation between Krishna and Karna. (Mbh 5.140).
  - As Kaurava Allies: They were also listed among the tribes supporting Duryodhana in the Kurukshetra War (Mbh 5.161–162). The message sent by Duryodhana to the Pandavas:
    "The Kamvojas, the Sakas, the Khasas, the Salwas, the Matsyas, the Kurus of the middle country, the Mlechchhas, the Pulindas, the Dravidas, the Andhras, and the Kanchis — these tribes protect my army."

=== Puranas ===
- Srimada Bhagavatam refer to Andhras, Pundras, Sabaras, Palindas, and Mutibas as Mleccha.
- Markandeya Purana refers to a tribe called the Andhrarakas along with the Maulikas, Asmakas, Bhogavardhanas, Naisikas, Kuntalas etc., as people inhabiting the Southern region.

Andhras are also mentioned in the Vayu, Skanda and Matsya Purana. Buddhist references to Andhras are also found.

== Buddhist texts ==
Amarāvatī in Andhra Pradesh is a major site for early Buddhist sculptures, some of which depict serpent-headed figures—possibly symbolic representations. The area was also known as Nāgadeśa, and its rulers as Nāgas.

Andhra's prominence in Buddhism is supported by its numerous monastic sites and trade routes. Vengi served as a major center, connected to Kaliṅga, Draviḍa, Kārṇāṭa, Maharāṣṭra, and Kosala.

== Early history ==
Greek historian Megasthenes reported in his Indica (c. 303 BCE) that Andhras were living in the Godavari and Krishna river deltas and were famous for their military strength which was second only to Mauryans in all of India. They had 30 fortified towns along the Godavari River and an army of 100,000 infantry, 2,000 cavalry and 1,000 elephants. Indica states that Andhra was a great and powerful nation settled originally in the Deccan between the lower Godavari and Krishna region, and had spread their sway towards the north as far as the upper course of the Narmada, before the time of Megasthenes.

The earliest epigraphic mention of the Andhra people is made in the Edicts of Ashoka, Andhras along with Pulindas were mentioned as border people. Andhras were also mentioned at the time of the death of the Mauryan Emperor Ashoka in 232 BCE. The Satavahanas were referred to as the Andhras, Andhra-bhṛtyas or Andhra-jatiyas in the Puranas.

9. hidā laja viśavashi Yona Kambojeshu Nabhaka Nabhapamtishu Bhoja Pitinikyeshu
10. Adha Paladeshu shavata Devānampiyashā dhammanushathi anuvatamti[] yata pi dutā
— Ashoka, Rock Edict 13, Kalsi Rock, South Portion

Translation : Likewise here in the king's (Ashoka ) territory, among the Yonas and Kambojas, among the Nabhakas and Nabhapamkits, among the Bhojas and the Pitinikas, among the Andhras and the Pulinda, everywhere (people) are conforming to Ashoka instruction in morality.

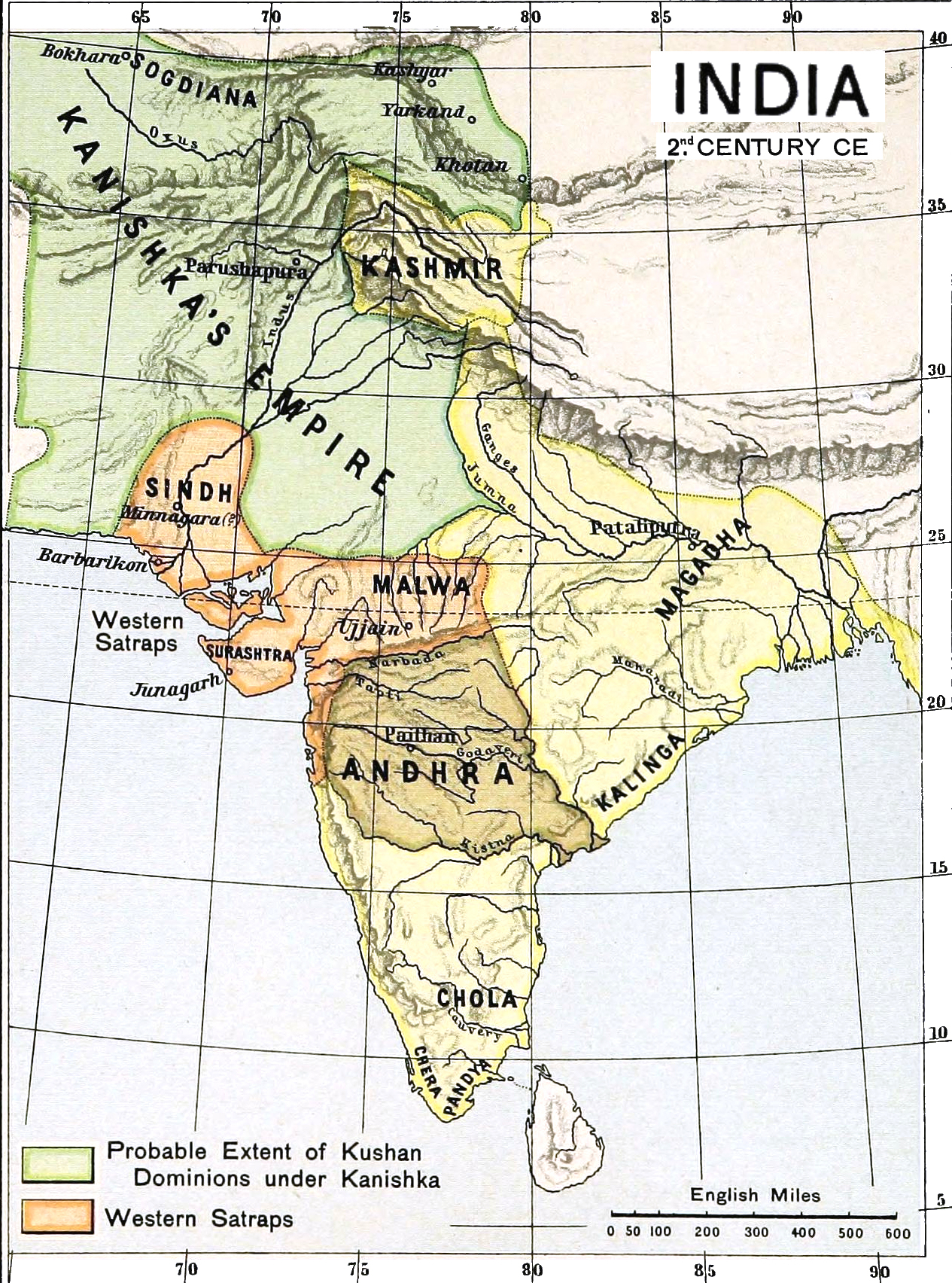
Andhra Kingdom

=== Andhra dynasty ===
Following the decline of the Maurya Empire and during the Shunga period, the southern tribes, previously described as "unsubdued" in Ashokan edicts, united under a centralised Andhra leadership. E. J. Rapson suggests this consolidation in the deltas between the Godavari and Krishna rivers laid the foundation for the rise of the Satavahana dynasty, also referred to as Andhra-bhṛtyas or Andhra-jatiyas.

The first major Andhra polity in the Indian subcontinent were the Satavahanas, which ruled over the entire Deccan plateau and established trade relations with the Roman Empire. Most modern scholars believe that the Satavahana rule began in the late second century BCE and lasted until the early third century CE, although some assign the beginning of their rule to as early as the 3rd century BCE based on the Puranas. Various Puranas give different lists of the Satavahana rulers. The first king of the Andhra-Bhrityas is also known as Shudraka or Suraka in the Kumarika Khanda of Skanda Purana. The Matsya Purana states that 30 Andhra kings ruled for 460 years, but some of its manuscripts name only 19 kings whose reigns add up to 448.5 years. TheVayu Purana also mentions that there were 30 Andhra kings.

The word Andhras was observed from Udyotana's description of "those with beautiful bodies, who love women and war alike, and are great consumers of food" in 779 CE. The references to Andhra also comes from the Jataka tales and the Pallava inscriptions as Andhapatham and Andhakas, referring to the region and its people respectively.

== See also ==
- History of Andhra Pradesh
- Kingdoms of Ancient India
