= Dandakaranya =

Forest featured in Hindu literature

Geography
- Location: Bastar, Andhra Pradesh, Maharashtra, Odisha and Telangana, India
- Area: 92,200 km^{2} (35,600 sq mi)

Dandakaranya (Sanskrit: दण्डकारण्य, romanized: Daṇḍakāraṇya), also rendered Dandaka (Sanskrit: दंडक, IAST: Daṃḍaka), is a historical region and the name of a forest mentioned in the ancient Indian epic Ramayana. It covers about 92,200 square kilometres (35,600 sq mi) of land, which includes the Abujhmar Hills in the west and borders the Eastern Ghats in the east, including regions of Andhra Pradesh, Chhattisgarh, Odisha, and Telangana states. It spans about 300 kilometres (200 mi) from north to south and about 500 kilometres (300 mi) from east to west.

== Etymology ==
Dandakaranya means "the Dandaka forest" in Sanskrit, the abode of the rakshasa Dandaka. Daṇḍaka also mean "stick, twig, rod, handle etc." It was the site of the Danda kingdom in Hindu puranic history, a stronghold of the rakshasa tribes. It was a state of the Lanka kingdom under the reign of Ravana. Ravana's governor Khara ruled this province.

== Origin story ==
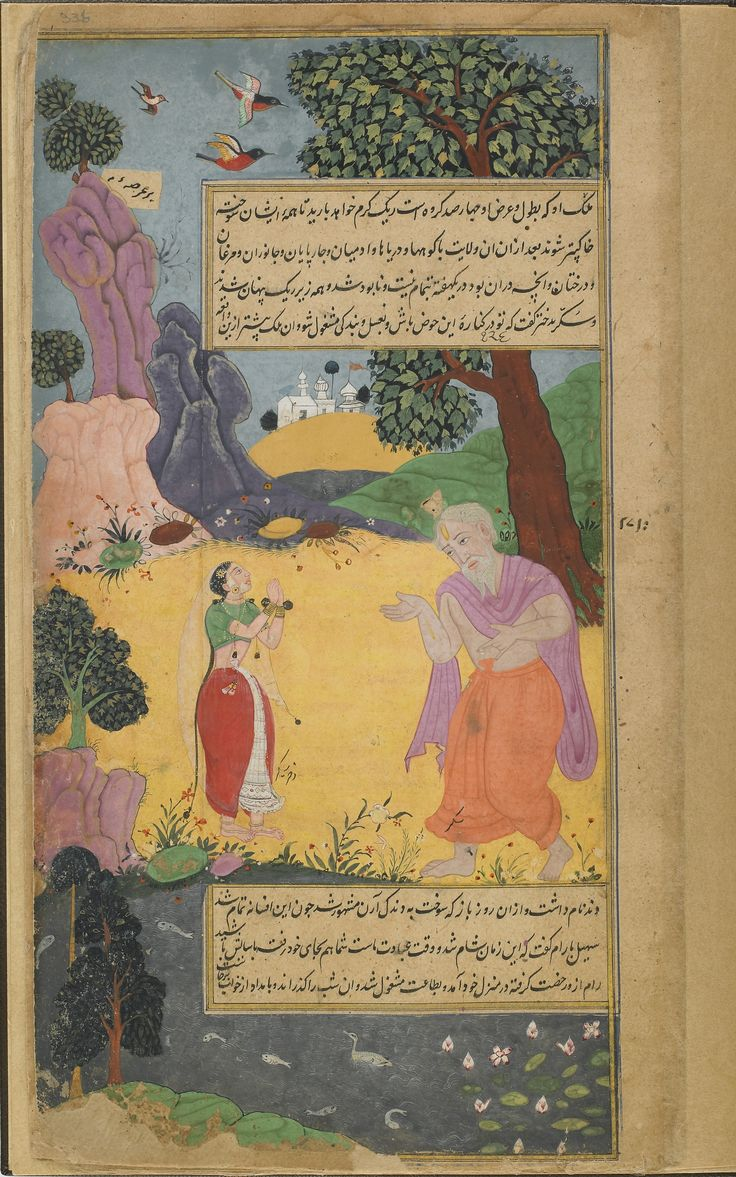
Shukracharya advises his daughter Aruja to remain beside the lake near his hermitage while a dust storm devastates the accursed kingdom of Danda

The origin of Dandakaranya is recounted in the Uttara Kāṇḍa of the Ramayana through the legend of King Daṇḍa, a son of Ikshvaku. Assigned by his father to rule the territory between the Vindhya and Ṛkṣa mountains, Daṇḍa established his prosperous capital at Madhumanta and appointed the sage Śukrācārya (Uśanas) as his royal preceptor.

During a visit to Śukrācārya's hermitage in the sage's absence, Daṇḍa became infatuated with the sage's daughter, Arajā (or Arujā), and violated her despite her warnings of her father's wrath. Upon returning and learning of the outrage, an enraged Śukrācārya instructed his disciples to evacuate the realm and told Arajā to remain beside a nearby lake to perform penance. The sage then pronounced a curse that Indra would destroy Daṇḍa's kingdom within seven days. Over the ensuing week, a cataclysmic storm of ash and dust buried Daṇḍa, his army, and his entire realm, turning the devastated land into a desolate wilderness known as Daṇḍakāraṇya ("the forest of Daṇḍa").

== Hinduism ==
Dandakaranya is considered sacred in Hinduism, as many accounts of the region describe ancient Hindu peoples and Hindu deities living together in refuge there. The Dandakaranya zone was the location of the turning point in the Ramayana, a famous Sanskrit epic. The plot for the divine objectives to uproot the rakshasas from the land was formulated here. According to the epic, it was home to many deadly creatures and demons. It is described to have stretched from Narmada to the Godavari and Krishna Rivers according to the epic. Rama, his wife Sita, and his brother Lakshmana, are described to have spent their initial years of fourteen years as exiles traveling around the region.

== In Buddhism ==
In Buddhist literature, the origin of the Dandaka forest (Pali: Daṇḍakārañña) is explained through a cautionary tale recounted in the Sarabhaṅga Jātaka (Jātaka No. 522) and referenced in the Milindapañha, Majjhima Nikāya commentary (Papañcasūdanī), and northern texts such as the Mahāprajñāpāramitāśāstra.

According to the Pāli tradition, Kisavaccha—a chief disciple of the Bodhisatta (who was born as the sage Sarabhaṅga) and a previous birth of Mahāmoggallāna—dwelt in solitude in the royal park near Kumbhavatī, the capital of King Daṇḍakī's realm (located in or bordering Kalinga). When a disgraced royal courtesan spat upon the ascetic and threw her tooth-stick onto his matted hair in a superstitious belief that defiling a holy man would restore her fortune, she regained the king's favor. Convinced of this omen, King Daṇḍakī, his royal chaplain, and his army marched to the park before quelling a border rebellion and deliberately defiled Kisavaccha with dirt and filth.

Although Daṇḍakī's pious commander-in-chief cleaned and tended to the sage, Kisavaccha warned that the wrath of the gods would annihilate the entire kingdom within seven days. After Sarabhaṅga's disciples carried Kisavaccha away to his hermitage—where he died amid a miraculous shower of celestial flowers—a cataclysmic rain of scorching embers, blazing rocks, and fine sand buried Daṇḍakī, his subjects, and sixty leagues of his realm. Only three individuals survived the devastation: Kisavaccha, the faithful commander-in-chief, and a pious youth from Benares who had cared for his parents. Over time, a vast, impenetrable wilderness grew over the ruined land, becoming known as Daṇḍakārañña ("the forest of Daṇḍakī").

== See also ==
- Danda kingdom
