= Danda kingdom =

Ancient Indian kingdom mentioned in Ramayana

Danda is a region frequently mentioned in Hindu mythology, and is prominently featured in various narratives, such as Dandaka, which refers to both a kingdom and forest of the same name. Danda was a colonial state of Lanka during the reign of Ravana, with his governor Khara ruling the province. The region served as a stronghold for all the Rakshasa tribes living in the Dandaka Forest

Historically, Danda is believed to have encompassed the Nashik District in Maharashtra, with its capital located at Janasthana, now known as Nashik city. It was from this region that the Rakshasa Khara launched an attack on Raghava Rama of Kosala, who was residing with his wife and brother at Panchavati, located in modern-day Nashik.

In the Ramayana, the demon Danda is portrayed as the maternal uncle of Ravana, being the son of Sumali.

== References in the Mahabharata ==
Though Dandaka was mentioned in the epic Ramayana, with great detail, a few mentions of this kingdom are found in the epic Mahabharata.

=== Sahadeva's conquests ===
Sahadeva, the Pandava general, and younger brother of Pandava king Yudhishthira, came to southern regions to collect tribute for the Rajasuya sacrifice of the king. Having acquired jewels and wealth from king Rukmin (ruling at the second capital of Vidarbha, named Bhojakata), he marched further south to Surparaka, Talakata, and the Dandakas. The Kuru warrior then vanquished and subjugated numberless kings of the Mleccha tribe living on the sea coast (2-30).

=== Dandaka forest ===
The forest of Dandaka was the biggest forest in ancient India, Dandakaranya. It stretched from Vindhya ranges in central Indian to the banks of river Krishnavenna (now known as river Krishna) and Tungabhadra in the south. Mention of this forest is found in Mahabharata at (3-85). The sacred forest of Dandaka is mentioned here along with its possible boundaries and the rivers flowing within it. Surparaka (North Konkan) probably formed its western boundary, with Mahendra Mountains in Orissa formed its eastern boundary, and the rivers Godavari, and Krishnavenna run through this forest. The river (or lake) Payoshni is mentioned at the northern entrance of this forest. According to the epic Ramayana, no kingdom except the Dandaka kingdom and Kishkindha kingdom is mentioned as lying within this forest. During the epic Mahabharata many regions that was formerly Dandaka forest were found to be habitable kingdoms. Dandaka kingdom was a kingdom of Rakshasas in the midst of the Dandaka forests.

Raghava Rama lived for some time in the forest of Dandaka, from desire of slaying the Rakshasas. At Janasthana, he cut off the head of a wicked-souled Rakshasa (as per epic Ramayana, his name was Khara) with a razor-headed shaft of great sharpness (9-39). Raghava Rama, that foremost of bowmen, taking his bow and in company with his queen (Sita) and brother (Lakshmana), with the view of compassing his father’s welfare, began to reside in the Dandaka forest. From Janasthana (the capital of Dandaka kingdom ), that mighty Rakshasa monarch, the wicked Ravana, carried away Rama’s queen. (3,146). A southern path through the Dandaka woods existed during the time of Raghava Rama. He travelled through this path in search of his wife, abducted by Ravana. Many uninhabited asylums of ascetics, scattered over with seats of Kusa grass and umbrellas of leaves and broken water-pots, and abounding with hundreds of jackals were seen along that path.(3,277).

== In Buddhism ==
In Buddhist literature, the origin of the Dandaka forest (Pali: Daṇḍakārañña) is explained through a cautionary tale recounted in the Sarabhaṅga Jātaka (Jātaka No. 522) and referenced in the Milindapañha, Majjhima Nikāya commentary (Papañcasūdanī), and northern texts such as the Mahāprajñāpāramitāśāstra.

According to the Pāli tradition, Kisavaccha—a chief disciple of the Bodhisatta (who was born as the sage Sarabhaṅga) and a previous birth of Mahāmoggallāna—dwelt in solitude in the royal park near Kumbhavatī, the capital of King Daṇḍakī's realm (located in or bordering Kalinga). When a disgraced royal courtesan spat upon the ascetic and threw her tooth-stick onto his matted hair in a superstitious belief that defiling a holy man would restore her fortune, she regained the king's favor. Convinced of this omen, King Daṇḍakī, his royal chaplain, and his army marched to the park before quelling a border rebellion and deliberately defiled Kisavaccha with dirt and filth.

Although Daṇḍakī's pious commander-in-chief cleaned and tended to the sage, Kisavaccha warned that the wrath of the gods would annihilate the entire kingdom within seven days. After Sarabhaṅga's disciples carried Kisavaccha away to his hermitage—where he died amid a miraculous shower of celestial flowers—a cataclysmic rain of scorching embers, blazing rocks, and fine sand buried Daṇḍakī, his subjects, and sixty leagues of his realm. Only three individuals survived the devastation: Kisavaccha, the faithful commander-in-chief, and a pious youth from Benares who had cared for his parents. Over time, a vast, impenetrable wilderness grew over the ruined land, becoming known as Daṇḍakārañña ("the forest of Daṇḍakī").

== See also ==
- Dandakaranya
- Kingdoms of Ancient India

== Sources ==
- Mahabharata of Krishna Dwaipayana Vyasa, translated to English by Kisari Mohan Ganguli
- Ramayana of Valmiki
