= Padha =

Coordinates: 29°34′N 76°47′E

Padha is a village in Karnal district, Haryana, India.

The main occupations are Kheti (Agriculture) and Pashupalan (cattle breeding). There is famous "Panch Thirath."
