= Yaksha kingdom =

Legendary kingdom in Hinduism

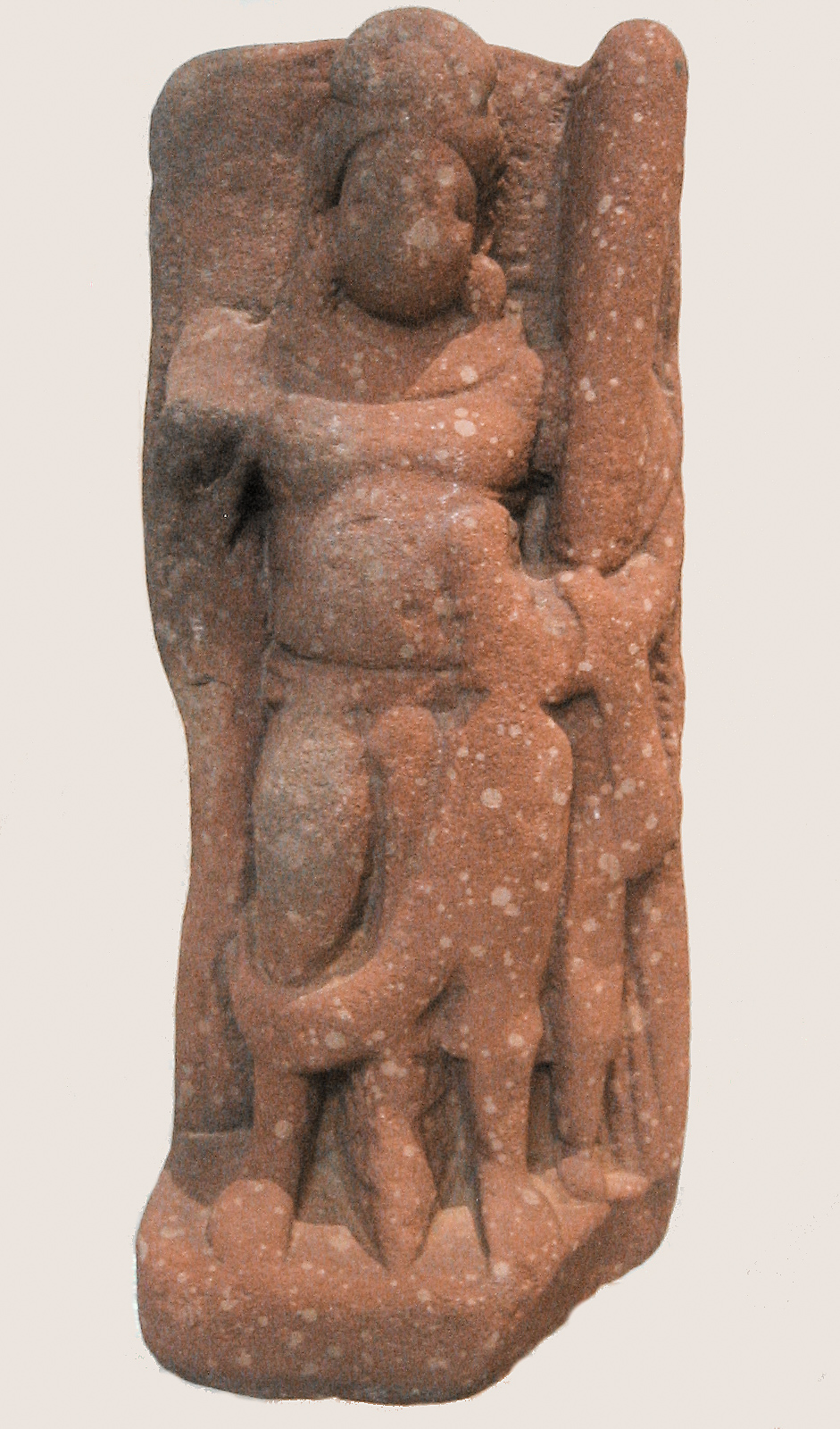
Mathura Yaksha, 1st-2nd century CE

The Yaksha kingdom is the mythological kingdom of the yakshas, a race featured in Hinduism. Kubera is referred to as the king of the Yakshas.

== References in the Mahabharata ==
=== Yaksha territory ===
The territory of the Yakshas under the kingship of Kubera is described in the Mahabharata as being the region surrounding the Kailasa mountains and Manasa lake in the Tibetan Himalayas. Hataka is a part of Yaksha.

==== Pandavas expeditions ====
Regarding the expeditions of the Pandavas guided by sage Lomasa, we are told (in the Mahabharata 3:139):

"Lomasa said, now hast thou left behind the mountains Usiravija, Mainaka and Sweta, as well as the Kala hills, O son of Kunti, O bull among the descendants of Bharata, here flow before thee the seven Gangas. This spot is pure and holy. Here Agni blazeth forth without intermission. Now wilt thou see the play-ground of the Devas, marked with their footprints, as we have passed the mountain, Kala. We shall now ascend that white rock—the mountain Mandara, inhabited by the Yakshas, Manibhadra and Kuvera, king of the Yakshas.

O king, at this place eighty thousand fleet Gandharvas, and four times as many Kimpurushas and Yakshas of various shapes and forms, holding various weapons, attend upon Manibhadra, king of the Yakshas. In these regions, their power is very great. And in speed, they are even as the wind. They can, without doubt, displace even the lord of the Devas from his seat. Protected by them, and also watched over by the Rakshasas, these mountains have been rendered inaccessible. Here are fierce ministers of Kuvera and his Rakshasa kindred."

Section 3:152 describes Pandava Bhima's expedition to the Yaksha territory:

Bhima saw in the vicinity of the Kailasa cliff, that beautiful lotus lake surrounded by lovely woods, and guarded by the Rakshasas. And it sprang from the contiguous cascades to the abode of Kuvera. And situated on the rocky elevation this expanse of excellent water was exceedingly fair. That unearthly receptacle of waters was covered with celestial Saugandhika lotuses. And this lake was the sporting region of the high-souled Kuvera, the king of the Yakshas. And it was held in high regard by the Gandharvas the Apsaras and the celestials. And it was frequented by the celestial sages and the Yakshas and the Kimpurushas and the Rakshasas and the Kinnaras; Hundreds and thousands of Rakshasas, named Krodhavasas, were guarding that lake, wearing uniforms and armed with various weapons.

==== Ashtavakra's expeditions ====
Section 13:19 describes sage Ashtavakra's expedition to this territory:

The illustrious Ashtavakra set out on his journey. He proceeded more and more towards the north and at last reached the Himavat mountains peopled by Siddhas and Charanas arrived at the Himavat mountains, that foremost of Brahamanas then came upon the sacred river Vahuda whose waters produce great merit. He rested for some more time by the side of that lake in the course of the Vahuda whose shores he had reached. Refreshed by such rest, he set out from that region and then proceeded towards Kailasa. He then beheld a gate of gold. He saw also the Mandakini and the Nalini of the high-souled Kubera, the Lord of Treasures. Beholding the Rishi arrived there, all the Rakshasas having Manibhadra for their head, who were engaged in protecting that lake abounding with beautiful lotuses, came out in a body for welcoming and honouring the illustrious traveller.

==== More information on the region ====
Section 5:111:

Because all the treasures of the north stretch in a line towards the east and the west, therefor the north is sometimes called the central region. Hither, is the asylum, known by the name of Vadari Badrinath. It was here, on the breast of Kailasa, that Kubera, was installed on the sovereignty of the Rakshasas, the Yakshas, and the Gandharvas. It is in this region that (Kuvera's gardens called) Chitraratha lie, and it is here that the asylum of (the Munis called the) Vaikhanasas is situate. It is here that the celestial stream called Mandakini, and the mountain Mandara are to be seen. It is here that the gardens called Saugandhi-kanaka are always guarded by the Rakshasas. Here are many plains covered with grassy verdure, as also the plantain forest, and those celestial trees called the Sautanakas. It is in this region that the mountains of Kailasa lie, the abode of Ailavila (Kuvera). It is here that the ten Apsaras known by the name of Vidyutprabha had their origin. Here, in this quarter, at a place called Usiravija, by the side of the golden lake, king Marutta performed a sacrifice. It is here that the brilliant and shining gold mines of Himavat exhibit themselves to the illustrious and regenerate Rishi Jimuta and hence known by the name of the Jaimuta gold. At (14:16) Pandavas were mentioned as mining this gold.

The region, called Mandakini, of king Vaisravana is attained by those highly blessed persons for whom are every joy and comfort. There Gandharvas and Yakshas and Apsaras live (13:102).

The spot where Ganga rusheth past, cleaving the foremost of mountains which is frequented by Gandharvas and Yakshas and Rakshasas and Apsaras, and inhabited by hunters, and Kinnaras, is called Gangadwara (3:90).

Delicious and cooling breezes murmuring through forests of tall Mandaras, and bearing fragrance of extensive plantations of jasmine, as also of the lotuses on the bosom of the river Alaka and of the Nandana-gardens, always minister to the pleasure of the King of the Yakshas. (2,10).

On the south of Nishadha is the Varsha called Hiranmaya where is the river called Hiranwati. There, liveth that foremost of birds named Garuda. And the people there, are all followers of the Yakshas, wealthy, and of handsome features (6:8).

- Brahma-vodhya, and Vrihadvati were mentioned as rivers of Yaksha regions (6:9).
- Arjuna had encountered Yakshas in Khandava forests.
- Karna had encountered Yakshas in Mahendra mountains.
- Yakshas were mentioned to be dwelling on the northern banks of river Saraswati (9:37).

=== King Vaisravana (Kubera) ===
The banks of river Narmada are described as the birthplace of Yaksha king Kuvera (Vaisravana), where his father Visravas, who was a sage, lived (MBh 3,89). King Vaisravana or Kubera was the ruler of Lanka which was guarded by hosts of Rakshasas. He had a chariot called Pushpaka capable of going everywhere according to the will of the rider. And the kingship of the Yakshas and the sovereignty over sovereigns were also his (2,272). Rakshasa Ravana defeated Kuvera in battle and obtained from him the sovereignty of Lanka. That adorable Being, leaving Lanka and followed by Gandharvas, Yakshas, Rakshasas, and Kinnaras, went to live on mount Gandhamadana (near Kailasa, Tibet). And Ravana forcibly took from him in the celestial chariot Pushpaka.

The lord Kuvera of body resembling pure gold, seated in his car of great splendor, and accompanied by numerous Yakshas came there. And the lord of treasures, possessed of great beauty, came there to see Arjuna, illuminating the firmament with his effulgence. (3:41).

At (3:160) is mentioned an encounter between Pandava Bhima and the Yaksha army. Here Krodhovasa Rakshasas were mentioned as part of Kubera's army. Maniman is mentioned as a friend of Kubera and a leader of the army. Kubera came to see Bhima the destroyer of his army.

- Kubera is sometimes mentioned as Ailavila (5:139).
- Kubera had a son named Nalakubera (9:47).

=== Sthunakarna ===
Another prominent Yaksha found mention in Mahabharata is Sthunakarna. He dwelt in a forest close to the Panchala kingdom. He converted Shikhandini, the daughter of Panchala king Drupada into a male by exchanging his male sexuality with her. Here the Yaksha is addressed as a Guhyaka, the one who dwells in caves or in hidden places.

There was a dense and solitary forest that was the haunt of a very formidable Yaksha called Sthunakarna. From fear of that Yaksha men never went into that forest. And within it stood a mansion with high walls and a gateway, plastered over with powdered earth, and rich with smoke bearing the fragrance of fried paddy. Entering that mansion, Sikhandini, the daughter of Drupada, began to reduce herself by foregoing all food for many days. Thereupon, the Yaksha named Sthuna, who was endowed with kindness, showed himself unto her (5,194).

=== Mystification of Yakshas ===
At 3:310 of Mahabharata is a conversation of a Yaksha and Pandava king Yudhishthira. Here Yaksha is described as a crane, sitting by a pond.

Manibhadras, and Vaisravana (Kubera), the king of the Yaksha were worshipped by travellers who travel through lonely territories, for protection against dangers. Manibhadra is one of the warrior in the Yaksha army of Kubera. Gandharvas were also part of his army (3:65).

At 3:229 this is more clear:

The man who beholds Dewa (people) while sleeping, or in a wakeful state soon turns mad, and the spirit under whose influence these hallucinations take place is called the Deva spirit. When a person beholds his dead ancestors while he is seated at ease, or lying in his bed, he soon loses his reason, and the spirit which causes this illusion of sensible perception, is called the ancestral spirit. The man who shows disrespect to the Siddhas and who is cursed by them in return, soon runs mad and the evil influence by which this is brought about, is called the Siddha spirit.

And the spirit by whose influence a man smells sweet odour, and becomes cognisant of various tastes (when there are no odoriferous or tasteful substances about him) and soon becomes tormented, is called the Rakshasa spirit. And the spirit by whose action celestial musicians (Gandharvas) blend their existence into the constitution of a human being, and make him run mad in no time, is called the Gandharva spirit. And that evil spirit by whose influence men are always tormented by Pisachas, is called the Paisacha spirit. When the spirit of Yakshas enters into the system of a human being by some accident, he loses his reason immediately, and such a spirit is called the Yaksha spirit.

It is known that excepting the first forty seconds the grey twilight preceding nightfall hath been appointed for the wandering of the Yakshas, the Gandharvas, and the Rakshasas, all of whom are capable of going everywhere at will (1,172).

=== Other references ===
- The Yakshas, milking the Earth, got the power of disappearance at will (7,67).
- The royal Kuvera, the chief of the Yakshas and the Rakshasas, is the lord of the treasury of Indra (12:289).
- Rishi Yaksha of great intelligence succeeded in restoring the Niruktas which had disappeared from the surface of the Earth and sunk into nether regions (12:342).
- Mankanaka is mentioned as a Yaksha and one of the gate keepers of Kubera (3:83).
- Manibhadra is mentioned as the king of Yakshas at (3:64).
- At Kusasthali once there was held a conclave of the Devas. And surrounded by grimvisaged Yakshas, numbering 300 maha-padmas, carrying various weapons, Kubera attended that conclave. (3:160).
- The great Yaksha Amogha with his attendants—the Jambhaka Yakshas and other Rakshasas were mentioned as army men of Kartikeya, in his battle with Asura Mahisha (3:230). (Mahisha himself was the son of an Asura in his wife who was a Yaksha.)
- Garuda had encounters with the Yakshas viz. Aswakranda of great courage, Rainuka, the bold Krathanaka, Tapana, Uluka, Swasanaka, Nimesha, Praruja, and Pulina.
- Shiva is mentioned as the friend of Kubera (12:284).

== See also ==
- Rakshasa kingdom
- Kishkindha
- Alaka

== Sources ==
Mahabharata of Krishna Dwaipayana Vyasa, translated to English by Kisari Mohan Ganguli
