= Kinnara kingdom =

Legendary kingdom in ancient India

In the Mahābhārata, Kinnara is a kingdom in the Himalaya mountains described as the territory of a people known as the Kinnaras. The Kinnaras, along with other exotic tribes, were inhabitants of the Himalaya mountains. In the epic Mahābhārata, the Kinnaras are described as half-man and half-horse beings, living at Mount Mandara.

== See also ==
- Centaur
- Kingdoms of Ancient India
