= Rajasuya =

Sacrifice performed by the ancient kings of India

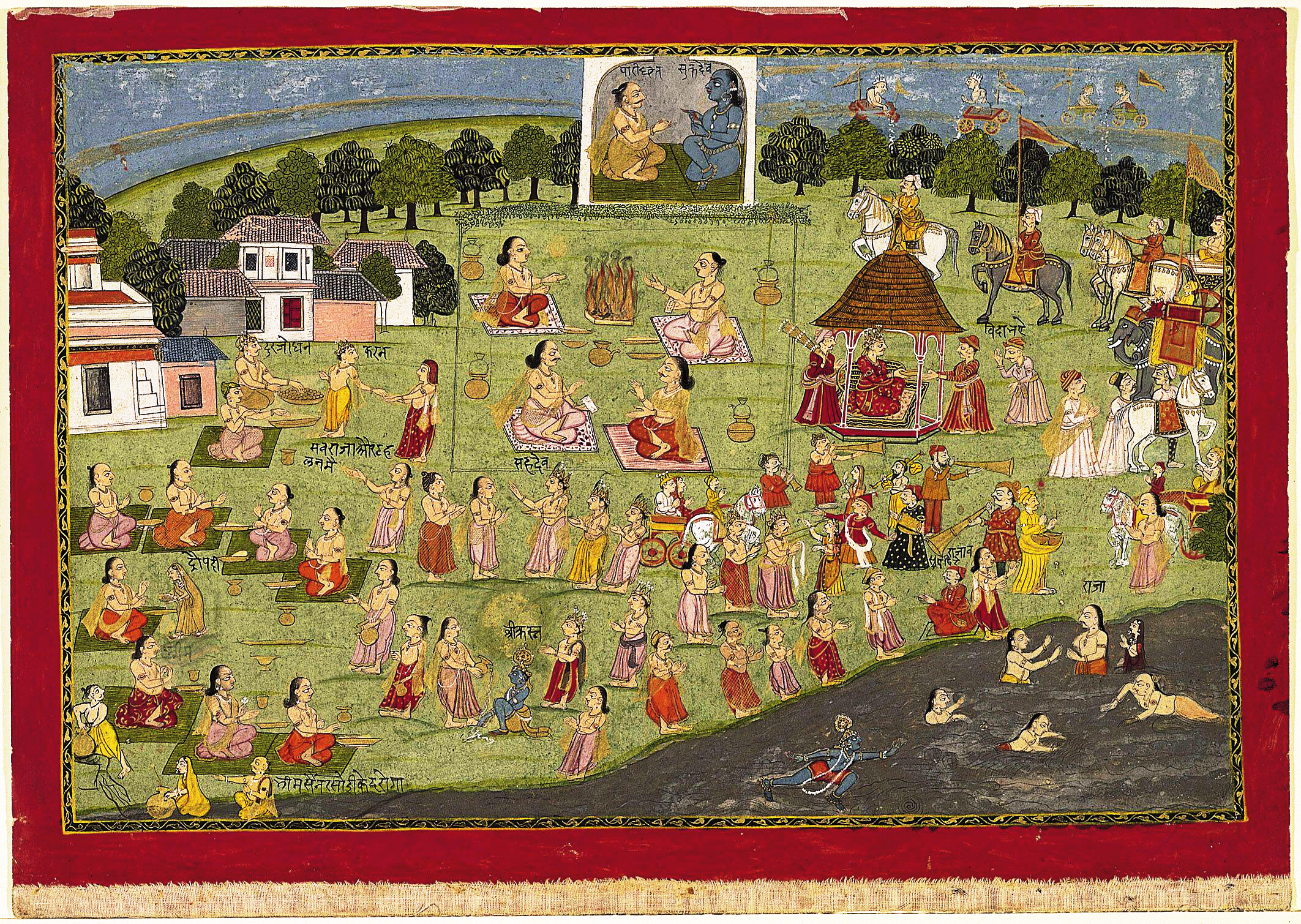
King Yudhishthira, a character in the Mahabharata, performs the rajasuya sacrifice

Rajasuya (Sanskrit: राजसूय, romanized: Rājasūya, lit. 'king's sacrifice') is a śrauta ritual of the Vedic religion. It is ceremony that marks a consecration of a king. According to the Puranas, it refers to a great sacrifice performed by a Chakravarti – universal monarch, in which the tributary princes may also take part, at the time of his coronation, as a mark of his undisputed sovereignty.

== Description ==
The rajasuya is associated with the consecration of a king and is prescribed as a ritual to establish a king's sovereignty. It is described in the Taittiriya corpus, including Apastamba Śrauta Sutra 18.8–25.22. It involves soma pressing, a chariot drive, the king shooting arrows from his bow, and a symbolic "cattle raid": The newly anointed king seizes cattle belonging to his relative, and then gives part of his property to that relative. Also included is a game of throwing dice with the Adhvaryu priest in which the king wins a cow, by which the king is enthroned and the cosmos is regenerated. There is a revealing of the tale of Shunahshepa, a boy who was nearly sacrificed to Varuna on behalf of the sonless king Harishchandra, which hints at a rejected archaic practice of human sacrifice.

The Shatapatha Brahmana states that the rajasuya was the means by which a Kshatriya may become a king, and is not suitable for Brahmanas.

Historically, the rajasuya was performed by the Indo-Aryan kings, which led to the expansion of their kingdoms during the Iron Age. The kings of Tamilakam performed the rajasuya, attended by monarchs of Lanka; Kharavela, the king of Kalinga, is described to have performed the rajasuya, despite being a Jain; and the Satavahana kings performed the ceremony. The sacrifice was performed by kings throughout the subcontinent; records of its performance in South India at least date until the time of the Vijayanagara Empire.

== See also ==
- Ashvamedha
- Rājyābhiṣeka
