= Gomati =

Gomati, Gomti or Gomathi (which means, among other things, "full of water") may refer to:

== Geography ==
- Gomati district, a district of Tripura state, India
- Gomati monastery, a monastery in Khotan, Turkistan, see Buddhism in Khotan
- Gomati Lake, a lake in Vadtal, Gujarat, India; dug by Swaminarayan
- Gomti Nagar, town in Lucknow, Uttar Pradesh, India; settled on the Gomti River
  - Gomti Nagar railway station, Indian railway station in Lucknow

=== Rivers ===
- Gomati River or Gomti River, a tributary of the Ganges River in Uttar Pradesh, India; the most commonly known of the rivers so named
- Gomati River (Gujarat), river in Dwaraka, Gujarat, India which flows to the Gulf of Kutch; source of the snail shells Gomti Chakra and the scared stones Dvaravati sila
- Gomati River (Rajasthan), a small river in Rajasthan, India
- Gomati River (Uttarakhand), a river in Uttarakhand, India
- Gumti River (Tripura), river in Tripura, India and Comilla, Bangladesh
- Gomal River, a river in Afghanistan and Pakistan, identified with the Gomati of the Rigveda
- Godavari River, a river of Maharashtra and Andhra Pradesh in India
- Mandovi River, a river of Karnataka and Goa in India

== Transport ==
=== Ships ===
- BNS Gomati, ship of the Bangladesh Navy
- INS Gomati, either of two ships of the Indian Navy

=== Railways ===
- Gomti Express, passenger train in India plying to and from Lucknow which is settled on the Gomti River
- Gomti Sagar Express, passenger train in India plying to and from Lucknow

== People ==
- Gomathi Marimuthu, Indian sprinter
- Gomathi Srinivasan, Indian politician
- G. Gomathi Sankara Dikshidar, Indian politician

== Others ==
- Gomathi Amman, goddess and temple in India
- Gomti Ke Kinare, 1972 Indian Hindi-language film set along the Gomti River
- Gomathi Nayagam, 2004 Indian film directed by Ponvannan

== See also ==
- Gomanta kingdom, ancient Indian kingdom
