= Awadh =

Region in Uttar Pradesh

- Region
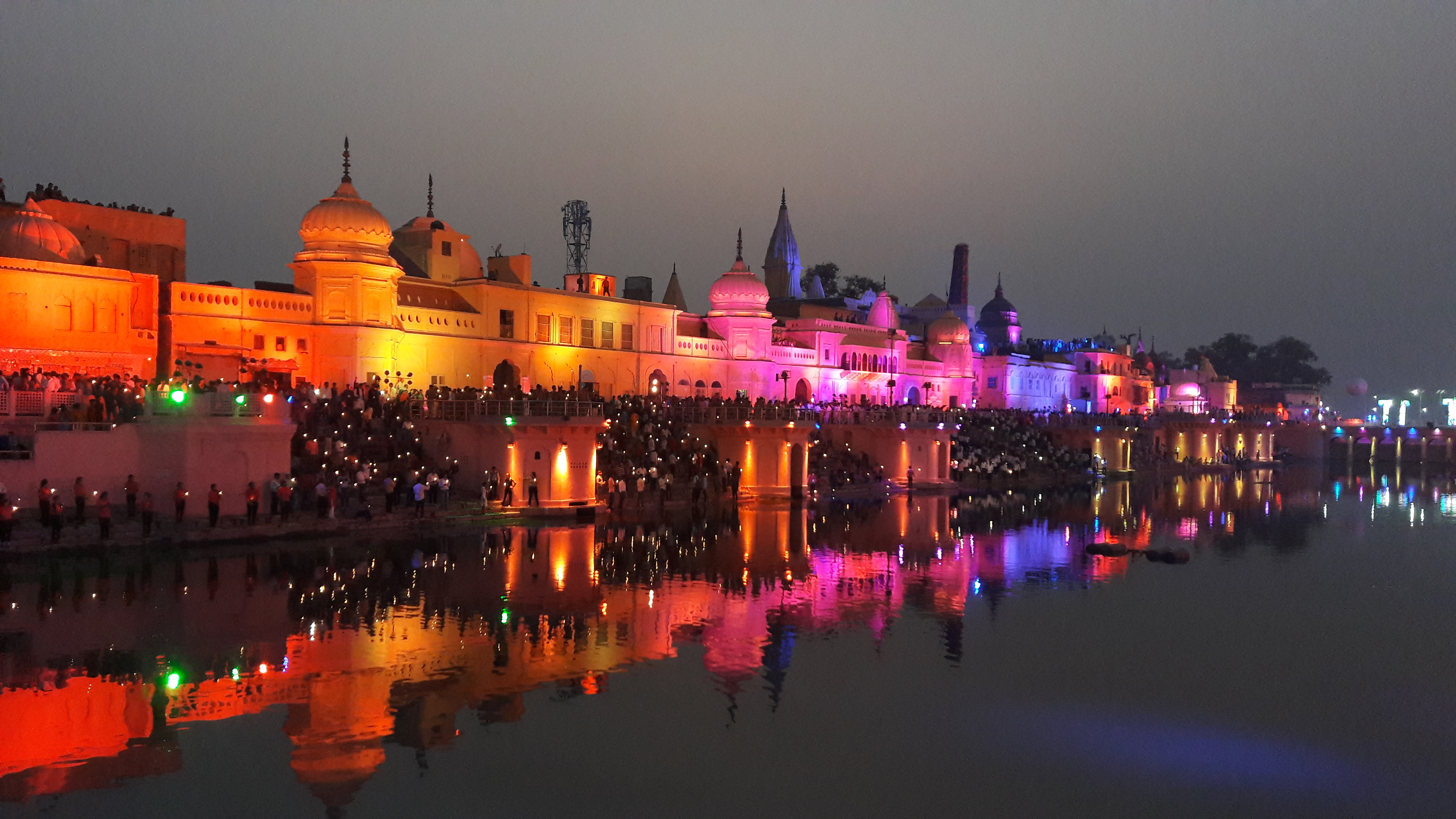
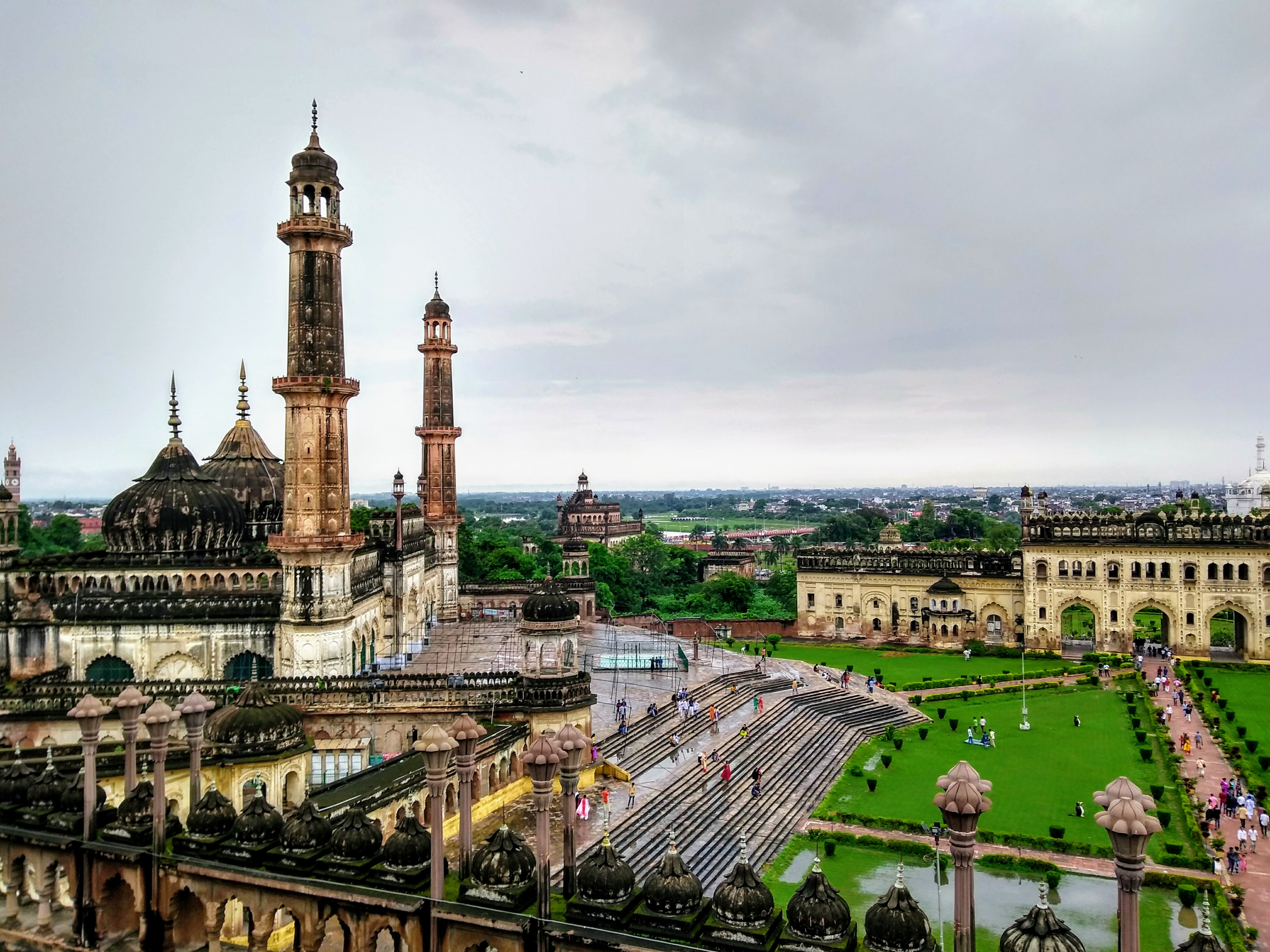
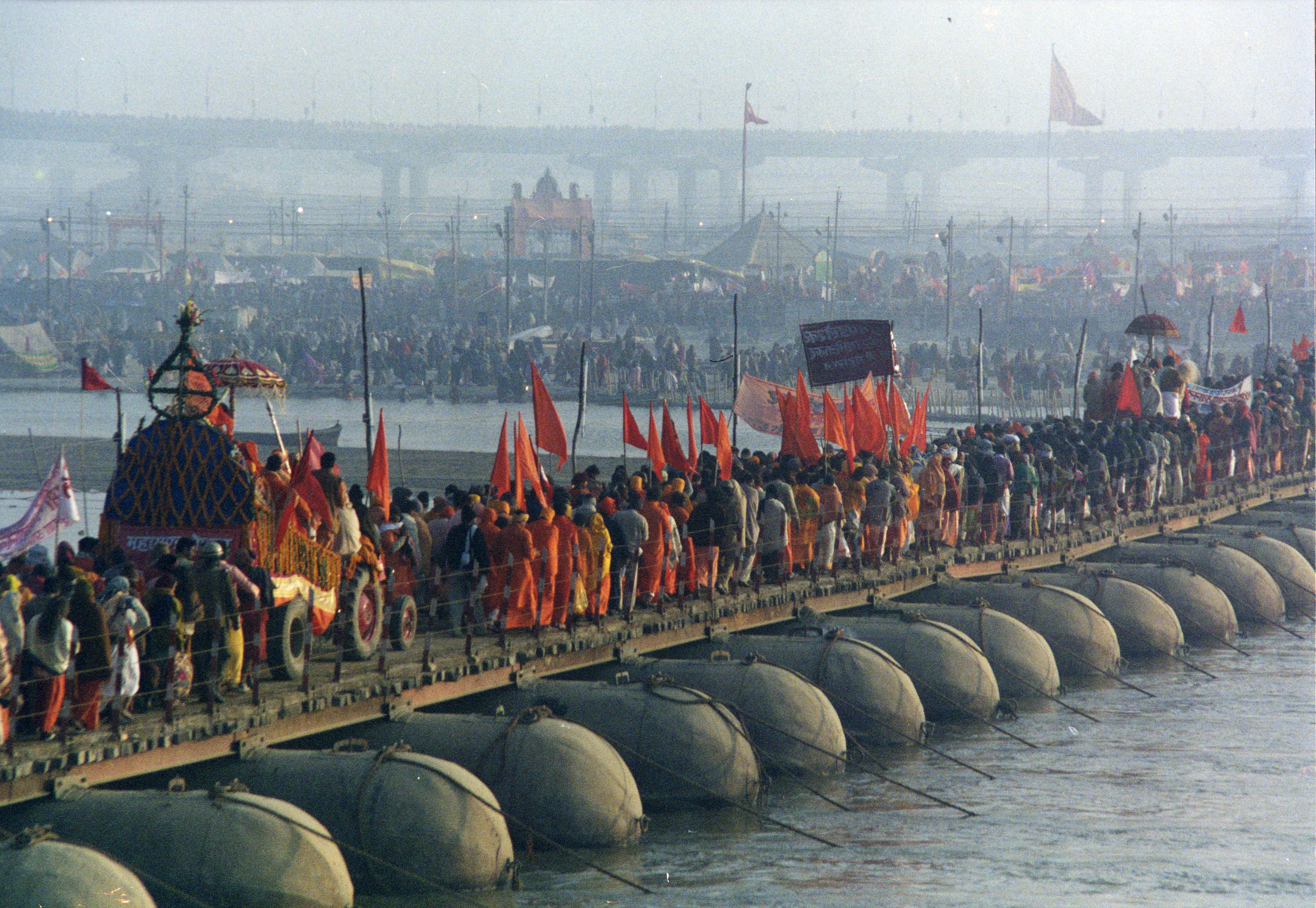
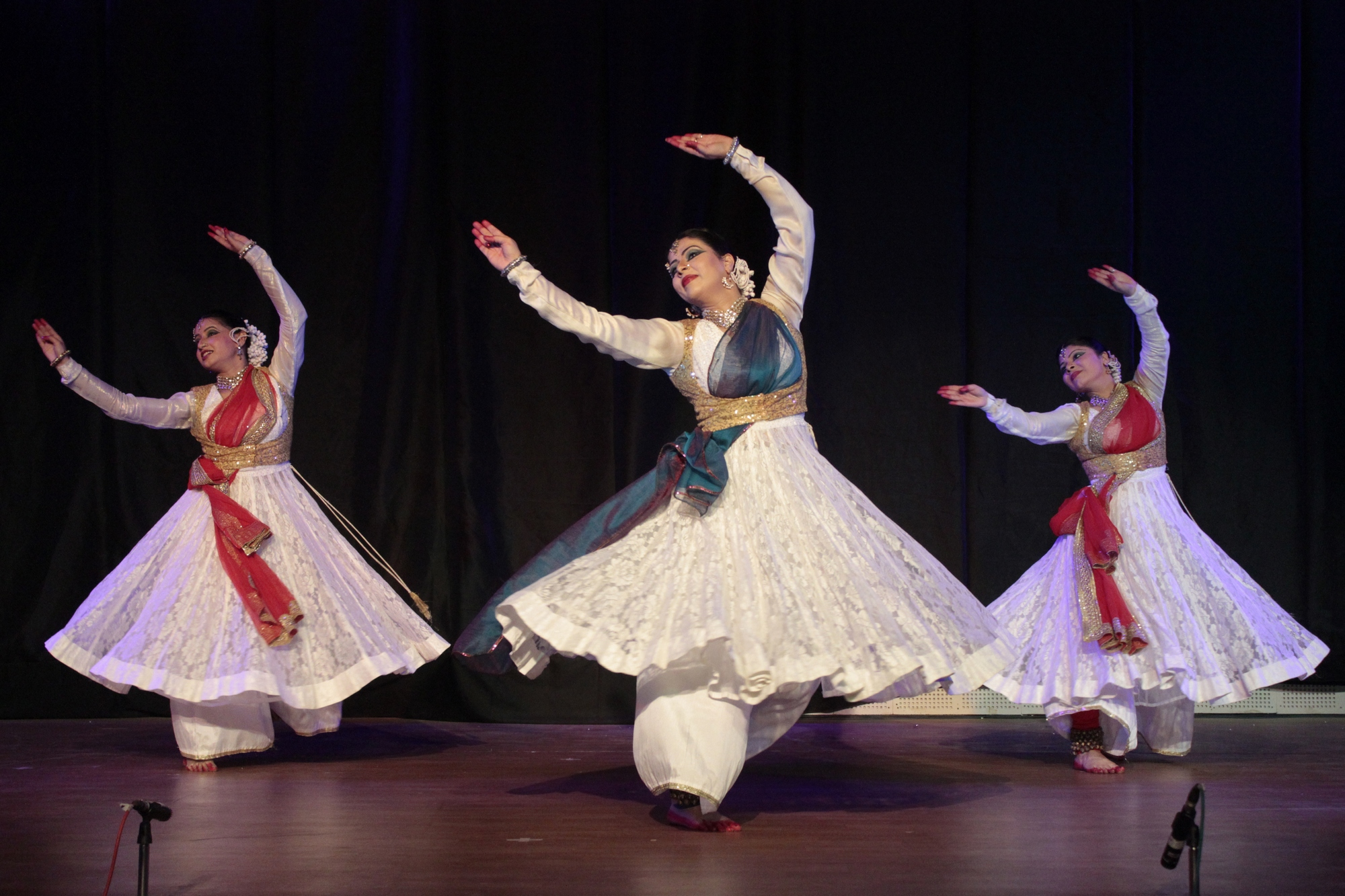
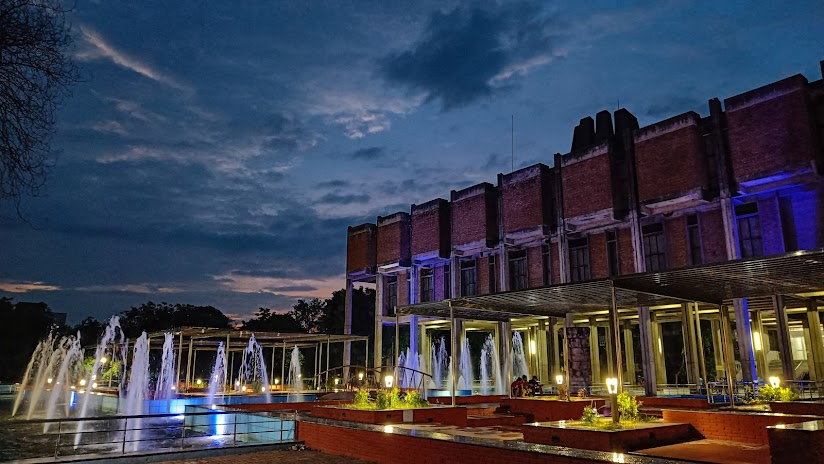
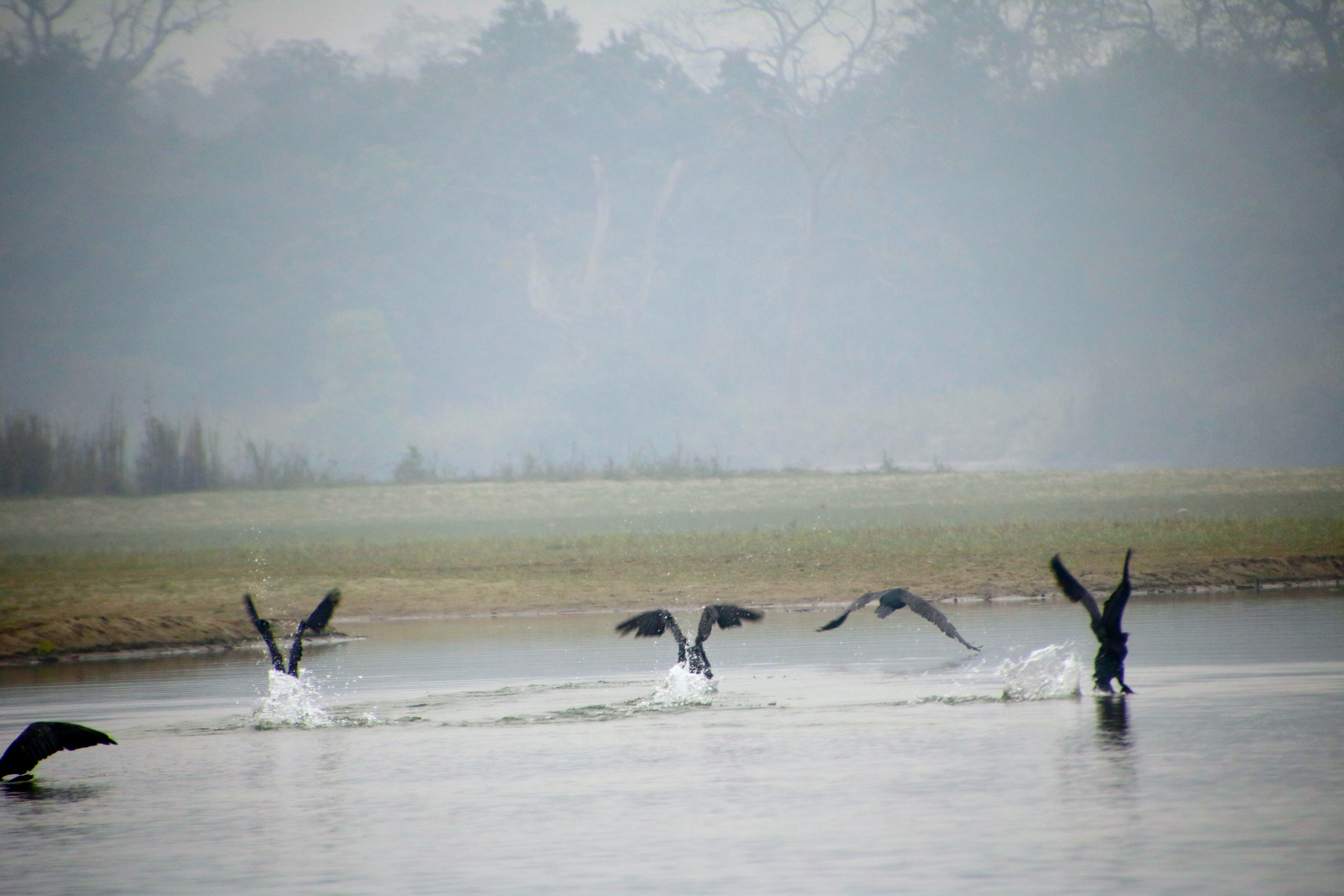
- Ram ki Paidi, Ayodhya Bara Imambara, Lucknow Procession of sadhus at the Prayag Kumbh Mela Kathak IIT Kanpur Katarniaghat Wildlife Sanctuary

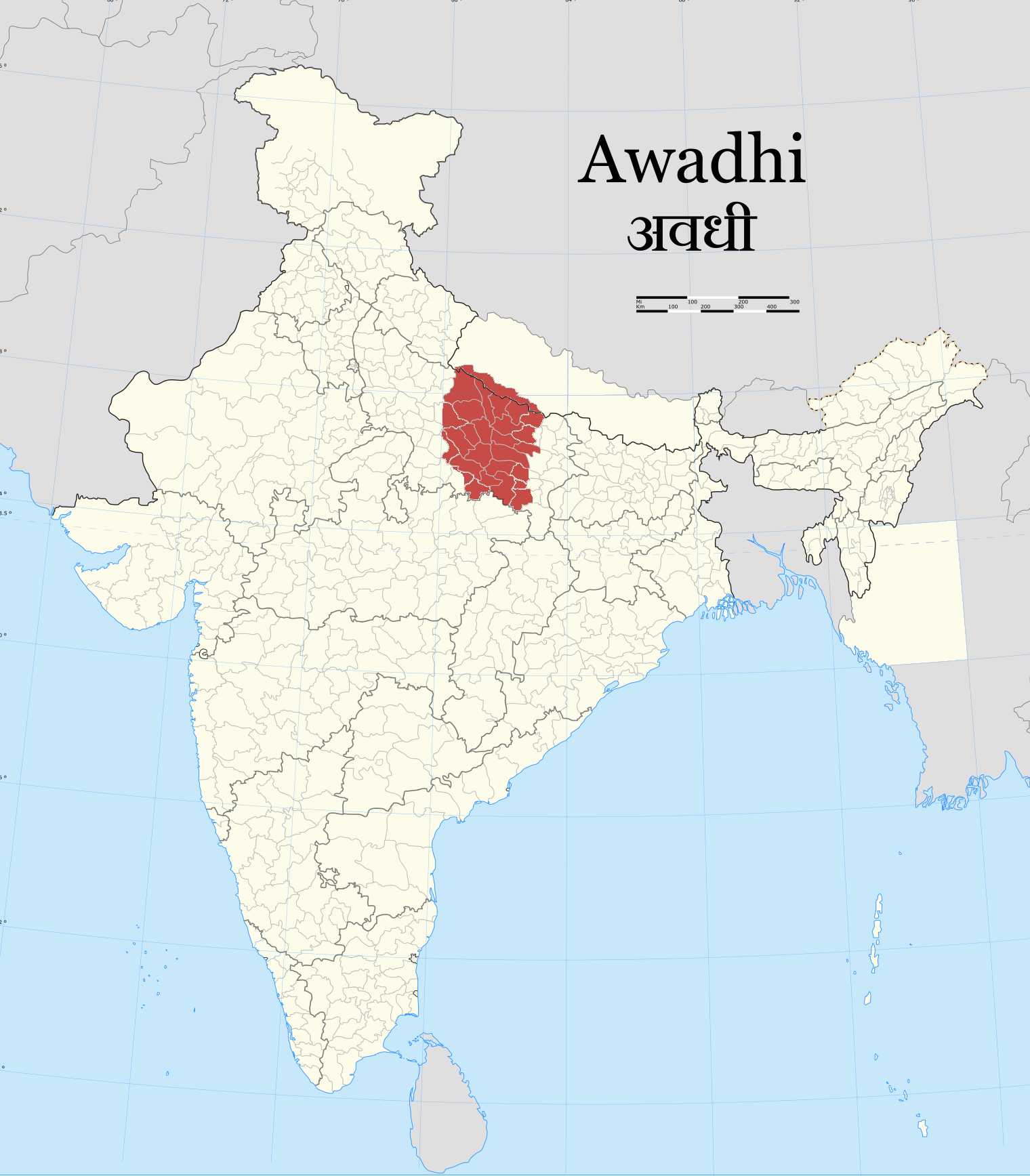
- Modern map of the Awadh region
- Coordinates: 26°54′N 80°54′E
- Continent: Asia
- Country: India and Nepal
- State/Province: Uttar Pradesh and Lumbini
- Covering territory: Lucknow division; Ayodhya division; Prayagraj division; Kanpur division (partly); Mirzapur division (partly)
- Languages: Awadhi, Hindi and Urdu

Area
  - Total: 68,006 km^{2} (26,257 sq mi)

Population (2011)
  - Total: 55,119,236
  - Density: 810.51/km^{2} (2,099.2/sq mi)
- Largest Cities: Lucknow; Prayagraj; Ayodhya; Kanpur; Mirzapur

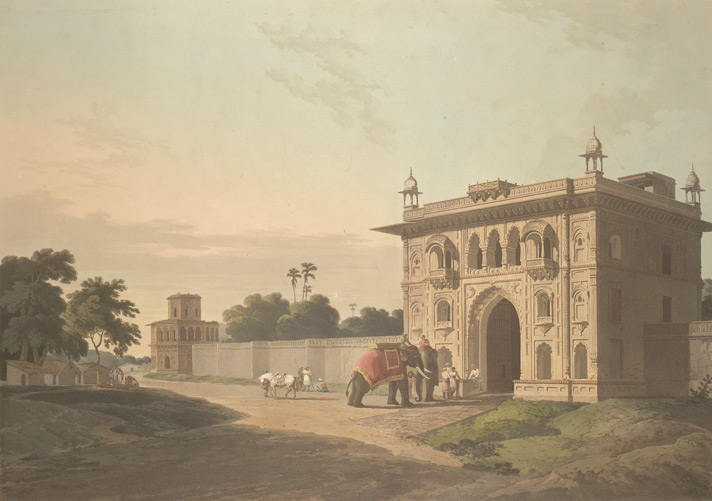
Lal Bagh entrance in Faizabad, Municipal Corporation of Ayodhya, as depicted in Gate of the Loll-Baug at Fyzabad by Thomas and William Daniell, 1801* (BL).

Awadh (Hindi: [əˈʋədʱ]), known in British Raj historical texts as Avadh or Oudh, is a historical region in northern India, now constituting the central portion of Uttar Pradesh. It is roughly synonymous with the ancient Kosala region of Hindu, Buddhist, and Jain scriptures.

It was a province of all the major Islamic dynasties in India including the Mughal Empire. With the decline of late Mughal Delhi, Awadh became a major source of literary, artistic, religious, and architectural patronage in northern India under the rule of its eleven rulers, called Nawabs. From 1720 to 1856, the nawabs presided over Awadh, with Ayodhya and Faizabad serving as the region's initial capitals. Later, the capital was relocated to Lucknow, which is now the capital of Uttar Pradesh.

The British conquered Awadh in 1856, which infuriated Indians and was recognised as a factor causing the Indian Rebellion (1857–58), the biggest Indian uprising against British rule.

== Etymology ==
The word Awadh is inherited from the Sanskrit word Ayodhya meaning "not to be warred against, irresistible".

== History ==
Awadh, known as the granary of India, was important strategically for the control of the Doab, a fertile plain between the Ganges and the Yamuna rivers. It was a wealthy kingdom, able to maintain its independence against threats from the Marathas, the British and the Afghans.

=== Ancient ===
Awadh's political unity can be traced back to the ancient Hindu kingdom of Kosala, with Ayodhya as its early capital in traditional history, though in Buddhist times (6th–5th century BCE) Shravasti became the kingdom's capital city.

Modern Awadh finds historical mention only in the Mughal time of Akbar, in the late 16th century.

In prehistoric times, Awadh, reputedly the kingdom of Bikukshi, contained five main divisions :

1. Uttara Kosala or the trans-Ghaghra districts, now known as Bahraich, Gonda, Basti and Gorakhpur.
2. Silliana, consisting of lower range of hills to the north of Uttara Kosala, now belonging to Nepal, with the Tarai at its base.
3. Pachhimrath, which may be roughly described as the country between Ghaghra and Gomti west to the line from Ayodhya to Sultanpur. This division included about third of present district of Ayodhya (including Ambedkar Nagar district), a small portion of the north of Sultanpur, greater part of Barabanki, and sections of the Lucknow and Sitapur districts.
4. Purabrath, which may be roughly described as the country between Ghaghra and Gomti east to the line from Ayodhya to Sultanpur. This division included about two-thirds of present district of Ayodhya (including Ambedkar Nagar district), the north-eastern corner of Sultanpur, and parts of Mirzapur district, Pratapgarh district and Jaunpur.
5. Arbar, extended southwards from Gomti to the Sai river.

=== Before independence ===
Since AD 1350 different parts of the Awadh region were ruled by the Delhi Sultanate, Sharqi Sultanate, Mughal Empire, Nawabs of Awadh, East India Company and the British Raj. Kanpur was one of the major centres of Indian rebellion of 1857, participated actively in India's Independence movement, and emerged as an important city of North India.

For about eighty-four years (from 1394 to 1478), Awadh was part of the Sharqi Sultanate of Jaunpur; emperor Humayun made it a part of the Mughal Empire around 1555. Emperor Jehangir granted an estate in Awadh to a nobleman, Sheik Abdul Rahim, who had won his favour. Sheik Abdul Rahim later built Machchi Bhawan in this estate; this later became the seat of power from where his descendants, the Sheikhzades, controlled the region. Until 1719, the Subah of Awadh (bordering (Old) Delhi, Agra, Illahabad and Bihar) was a province of the Mughal Empire, administered by a Nazim or Subah Nawab (governor) appointed by the Emperor. Nawab –the plural of the Arabic word 'Naib', meaning 'assistant'– was the term given to subahdars (provincial governors) appointed by the Mughal emperor all over India to assist him in managing the empire. In the absence of expeditious transport and communication facilities, they were practically independent rulers of their territory and wielded the power of life and death over their subjects. Persian adventurer Saadat Khan, also called Burhan-ul-Mulk, was appointed the Nazim of Awadh in 1722 and he established his court in Faizabad near Lucknow. The Nawabs of Lucknow were in fact the Nawabs of Awadh, but were so referred to because after the reign of the third Nawab, Lucknow became the capital of their realm, where the British station Residents ('diplomatic' colonial Agents) from 1773. The city was "North India's cultural capital"; its nawabs, best remembered for their refined and extravagant lifestyles, were patrons of the arts. Under them music and dance flourished, and many monuments were erected. Of the monuments standing today, the Bara Imambara, the Chhota Imambara and the Rumi Darwaza are notable examples. One of the more lasting contributions by the Nawabs is the syncretic composite culture that has come to be known as the Ganga-Jamuni Tehzeeb.

=== Awadh under the Mughals ===
From the pre-historic period to the time of Akbar, the limits of the subah (imperial top-level province) and its internal divisions seem to have been constantly changing, and the name of Oudh, or Awadh, seems to have been applicable to only one of the ancient divisions or Sarkars, nearly corresponding to old Pachhimrath. The title of Subehdar (governor) of Awadh is mentioned as early as 1280 AD, but it can only have denoted the governor of the tract of the country above defined. The Awadh of Mughal Badshah (emperor) Akbar was one of the twelve (or fifteen) subahs into which he divided the Mughal Empire as it stood in 1590. As constituted at the end of the sixteenth century, the Subah contained five sarkars, viz. Awadh, Lucknow, Bahraich, Khairabad and Gorakhpur, which in turn were divided in numerous mahals and dasturs (districts).

Khan Zaman Khan Ali Asghar son of Qazi Ghulam Mustafa was appointed as Subahdar of Awadh during the reign of Farrukhsiyar. This appointment was made in place of 'Aziz Khan Chughtai'. Later on, Mahabat Khan was appointed as Subahdar of Awadh in place of Khan Zaman Khan Ali Asghar, who was all over again transferred to Azimabad (Patna) as Subahdar in place of 'Sar Buland Khan'.

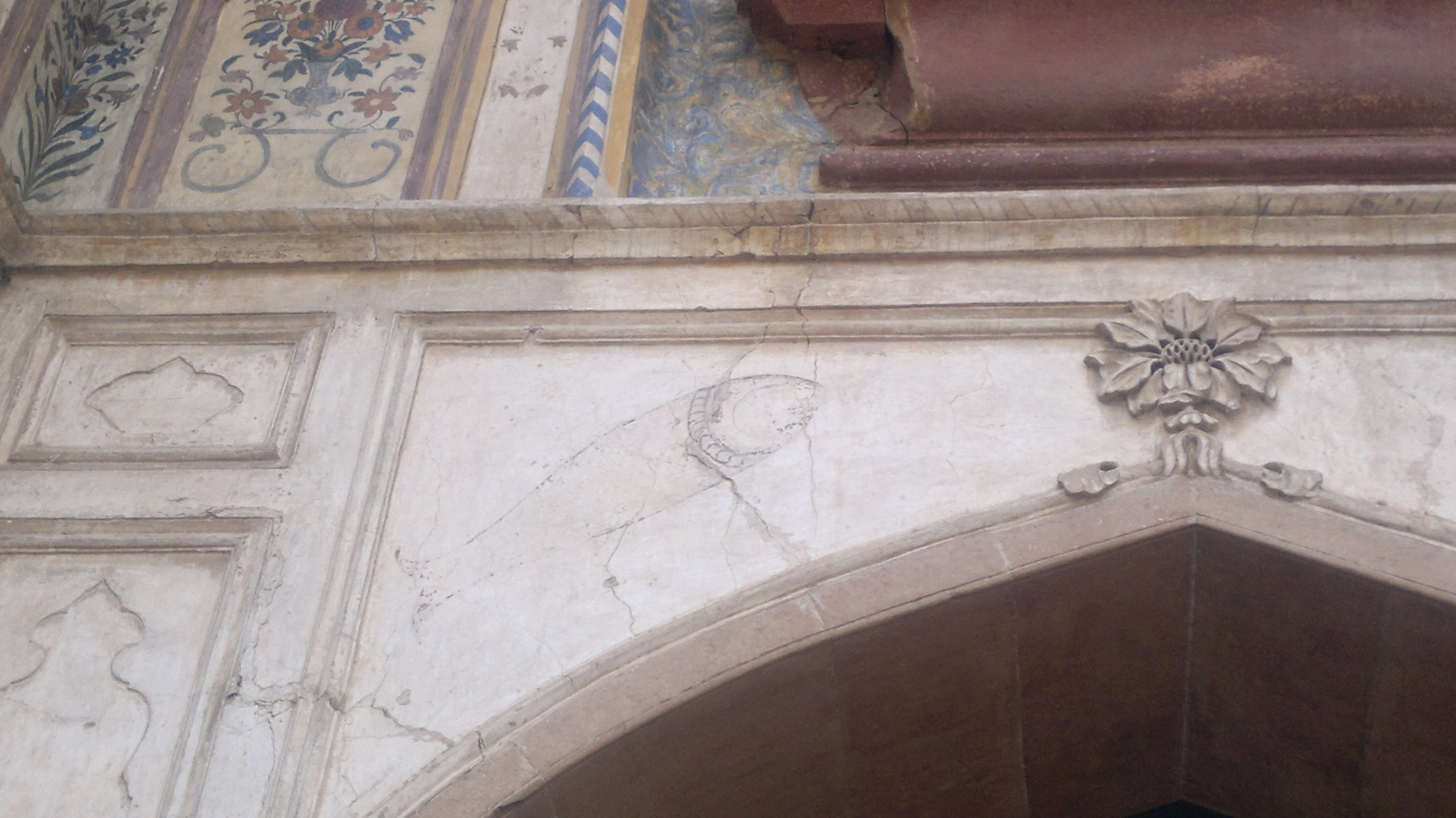
Mahi Maraatib fish emblazoned over the gateway to Safdarjung's tomb

It seems to have been of nearly the same extent as the Province of Oudh at the time of annexation to British India in 1858, and to have differed only in including Gorakhpur, Basti, and in excluding Manikpur, or the territory to the east and South of Sultanpur and Pratapgarh.

=== Under the hereditary Nawabs of Awadh ===
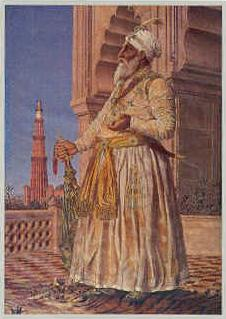
Saadat Ali Khan, the first Nawab of Awadh, who laid the foundation of Faizabad.

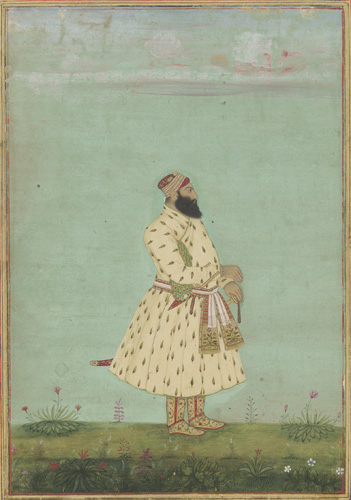
Safdarjung, the second Nawab of Awadh, who made Faizabad a military headquarters.

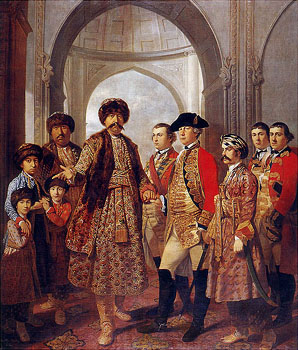
Shuja-ud-Daula, the third Nawab in Faizabad, pictured with Four Sons, General Barker and other Military Officers.

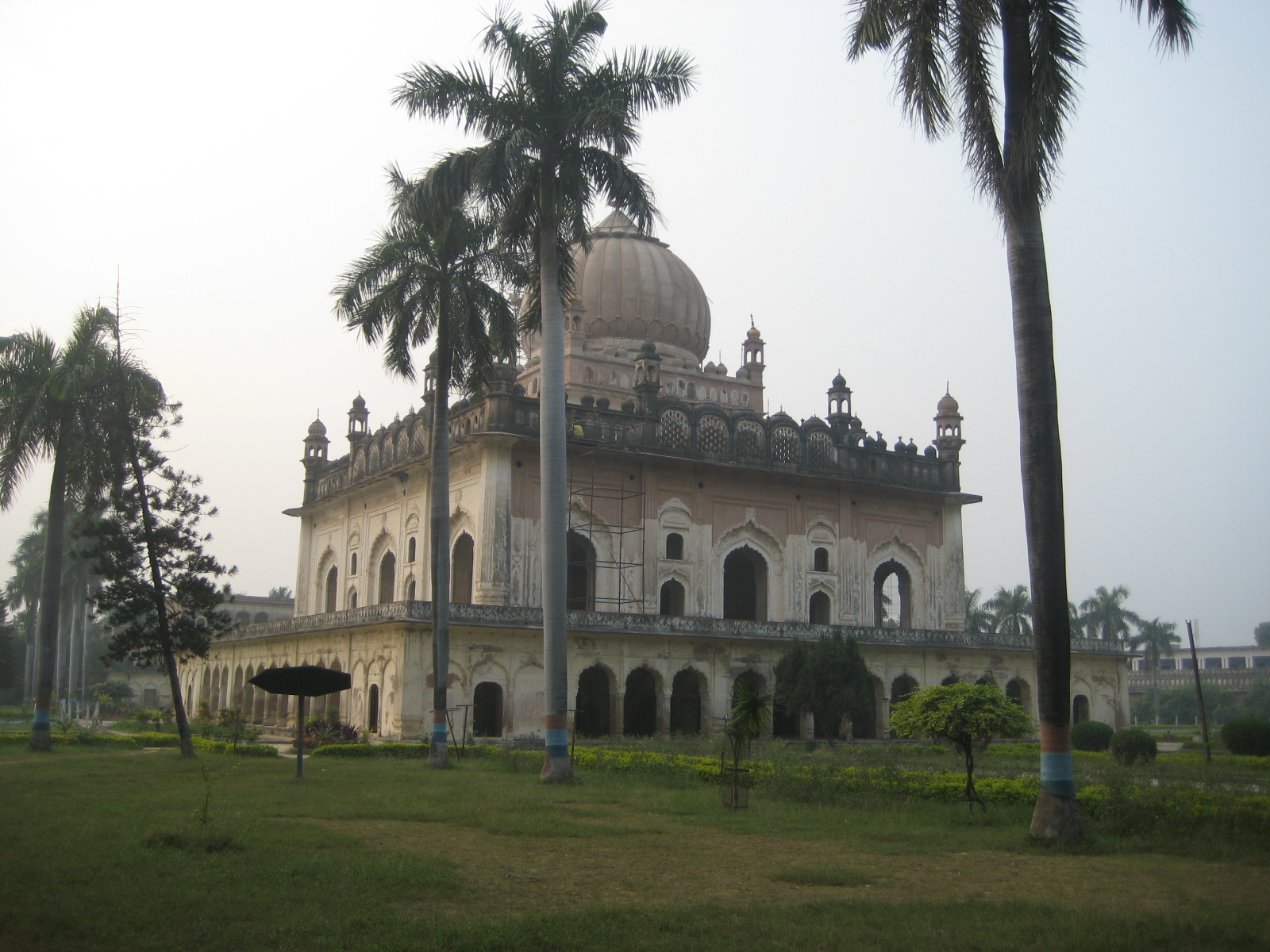
Gulab Bari in Faizabad is the tomb of Shuja-ud-Daula, The third Nawab of Awadh.

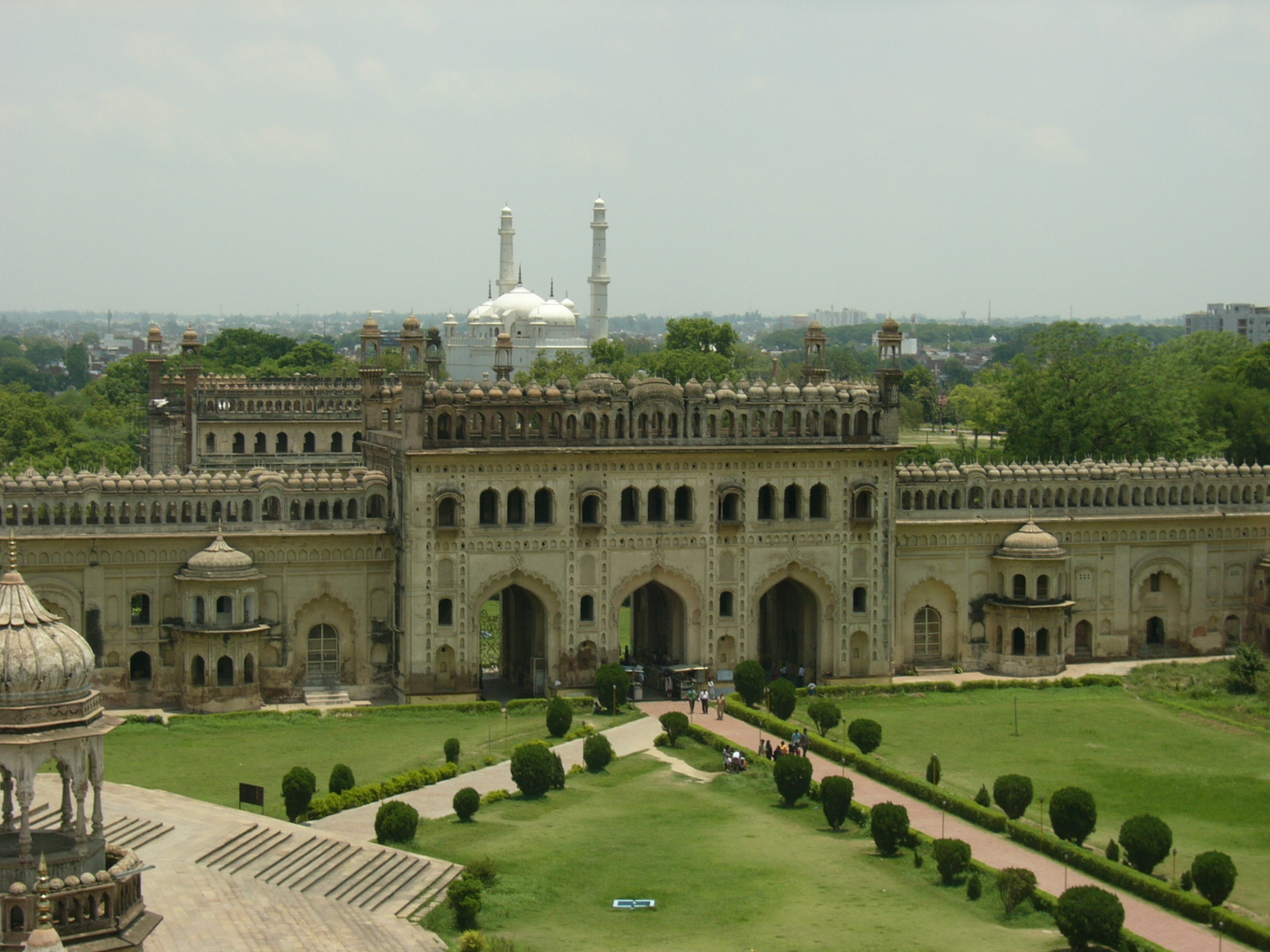
Bara Imambara in Lucknow is the tomb of Asaf-ud-Daula, the fourth Nawab of Awadh.

As the Mughal power declined and the emperors lost their paramountcy and they became first the puppets and then the prisoners of their feudatories, so Awadh grew stronger and more independent. Its capital city was Faizabad. Saadat Khan, the first Nawab of Awadh, laid the foundation of Faizabad at the outskirt of ancient city of Ayodhya. Faizabad developed as a township during the reign of Safdar Jang, the second nawab of Avadh (1739–54), who made it his military headquarters while his successor Shuja-ud-daula made it a full-fledged capital city.

Shuja-ud-Daula, the third Nawab of Awadh, built a fort known as "Chhota Calcutta", now in ruins. In 1765 he built the Chowk and Tir-paulia and subsequently laid out the Angoori Bagh and Motibagh to the south of it, Asafbagh and Bulandbagh to the west of the city. During the reign of Shuja-Ud-Daula, Faizabad attained such a prosperity which it never saw again. The Nawabs graced Faizabad with several notable buildings, including the Gulab Bari, Moti Mahal and the tomb of Bahu Begum. Gulab Bari stands in a garden surrounded by a wall, approachable through two large gateways. These buildings are particularly interesting for their assimilative architectural styles.

Shuja-ud-Daula's wife was the well known Bahu Begum, who married the Nawab in 1743 and continued to reside in Faizabad, her residence being the Moti-Mahal. Close by at Jawaharbagh lies her Maqbara, where she was buried after her death in 1816. It is considered to be one of the finest buildings of its kind in Awadh, which was built at the cost of three lakh rupees by her chief advisor Darab Ali Khan. A fine view of the city is obtainable from top of the begum's tomb. Bahu Begum was a woman of great distinction and rank, bearing dignity. Most of the Muslim buildings of Faizabad are attributed to her. From the date of Bahu Begum's death in 1815 till the annexation of Avadh, the city of Faizabad gradually fell into decay. The glory of Faizabad finally eclipsed with the shifting of capital from Faizabad to Lucknow by Nawab Asaf-ud-Daula.

The Nawabs of Awadh were a Persian Shia Muslim dynasty from Nishapur, who not only encouraged the existing Persian-language belle-lettrist activity to shift from Delhi, but also invited, and received, a steady stream of scholars, poets, jurists, architects, and painters from Iran. Thus Persian was used in government, in academic instruction, in high culture, and in court.

Saadat Khan Burhanul Mulk was appointed Nawab in 1722 and established his court in Faizabad near Lucknow. He took advantage of a weakening Mughal Empire in Delhi to lay the foundation of the Awadh dynasty. His successor was Safdarjung the very influential noble at the Mughal court in Delhi. Until 1819, Awadh was a province of the Mughal Empire administered by a Nawab.

Awadh was known as the granary of India and was important strategically for the control of the Doab, the fertile plain between the Ganges and the Yamuna rivers. It was a wealthy kingdom, able to maintain its independence against encroachment by the Marathas, the British and the Afghans.

The third Nawab, Shuja-ud-Daula, fell out with the British East India Company (EIC) after aiding Mir Qasim the fugitive Nawab of Bengal. He was comprehensively defeated in the Battle of Buxar by a British army, after which he was forced to pay heavy penalties and cede parts of his territory. The British appointed a resident at Lucknow in 1773, and over time gained control of more territory and authority in the state. They were disinclined to capture Awadh outright, because that would bring them face to face with the Marathas and the remnants of the Mughal Empire.

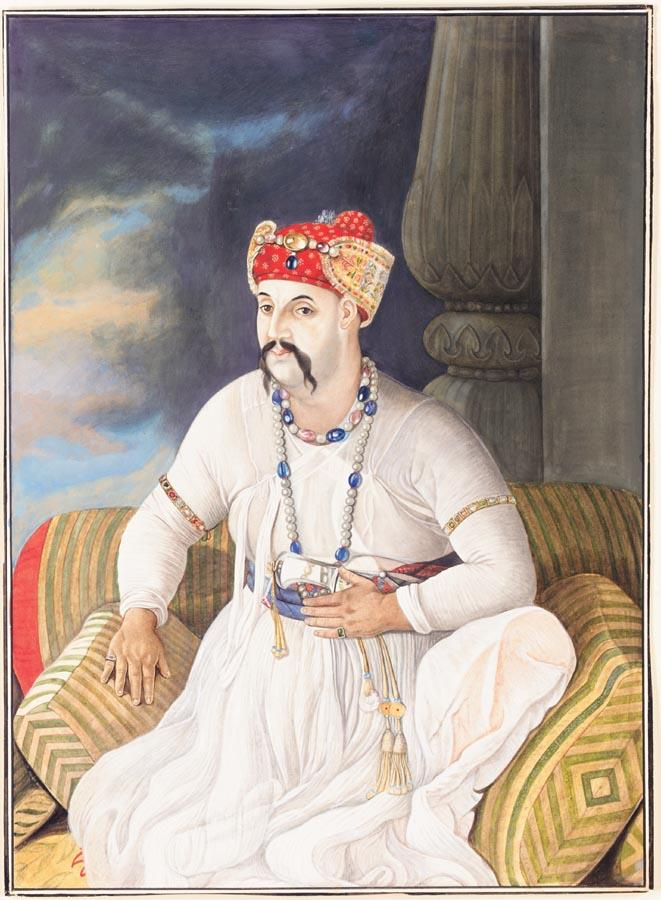
Asaf-Ud-Dowlah, The fourth Nawab of Awadh, who shifted the capital of Awadh from Faizabad to Lucknow.

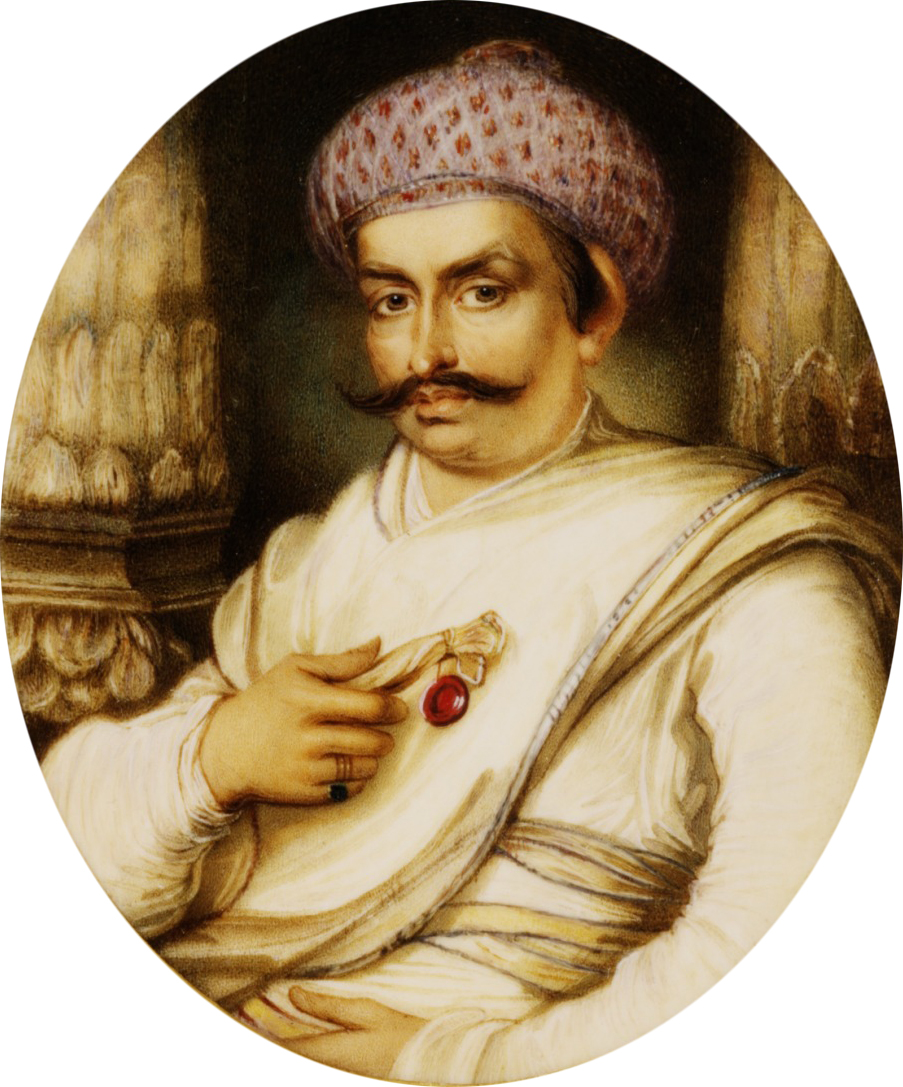
Hyder Beg Khan, minister to Nawab of Awadh, Asaf-ud-Daula

Asaf-ud-Daula, the fourth Nawab and son of Shuja-ud-Daula, moved the capital from Faizabad to Lucknow in 1775 and laid the foundation of a great city. His rule saw the building of the Asafi Imambara and Rumi Darwaza, built by Raja Tikait Rai Nawab Wazir (Diwan) of Awadh, which till date are the biggest architectural marvels in the city. Asaf-ud-Daula made Lucknow one of the most prosperous and glittering cities in all India. It is said, he moved because he wanted to get away from the control of a dominant mother. On such a thread did the fate of the city of Lucknow depend.

In 1798, the fifth Nawab Wazir Ali Khan alienated both his people and the British, and was forced to abdicate. The EIC then helped Saadat Ali Khan to the throne. Saadat Ali Khan was a puppet king, who in the treaty of 1801 ceded half of Awadh to the East India Company and also agreed to disband his army in favour of a more expensive one run by British officers. This treaty effectively made part of the state of Awadh a vassal to the EIC, though they continued to be part of the Mughal Empire in name till 1819.

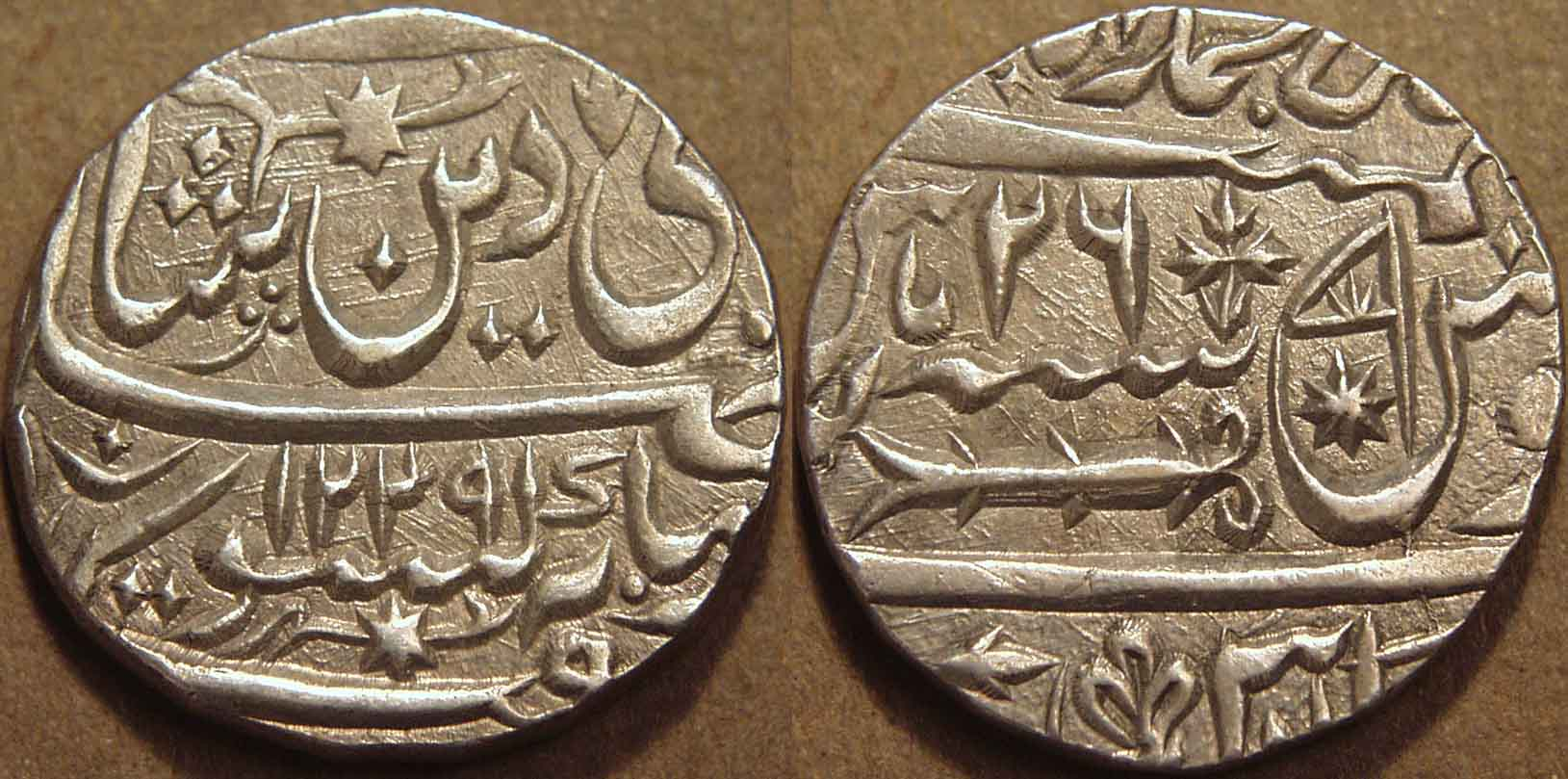
Silver rupee of Awadh, struck in the name of the Mughal emperor Shah Alam II at Lucknow in AH 1229 (=1814–15 CE). The coin features a stylised fish on the reverse, the dynastic symbol of the Nawabs of Awadh, seen also on the Awadh flag. At this time, the fiction that Awadh was subject to the Mughal emperor was maintained.

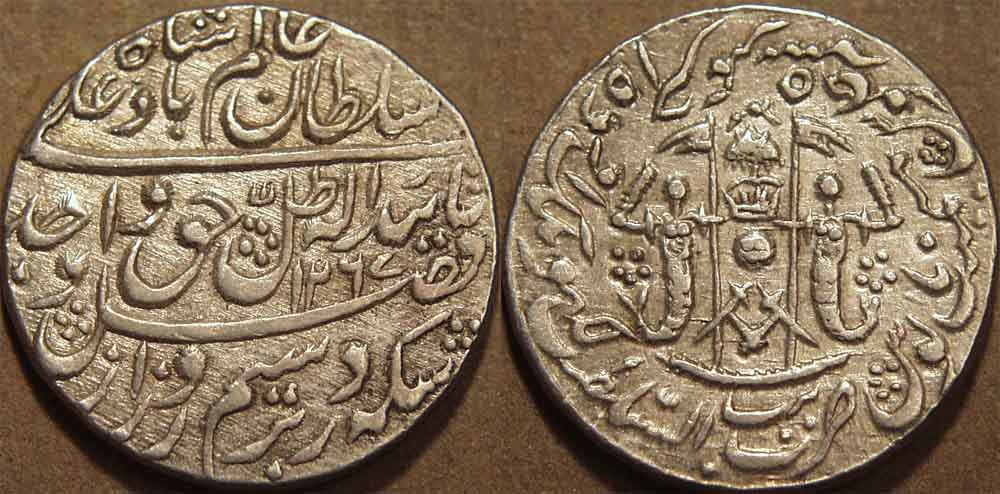
Silver rupee of Wajid Ali Shah, struck at Lucknow in AH 1267 (1850–51 CE) and showing the Awadh coat of arms. Starting in 1819, coins no longer mentioned the Mughal emperor, but were struck in the nawab's own name.

Coins were struck under the nawab's control for the first time in 1737, at a new mint opened in Banaras, although the coins named the Mughal emperor, not the Nawab. After the Battle of Buxar, Baranas fell under British rule, and so the mint was moved in 1776 to Lucknow. From there, coins in the name of the Mughal emperor continued to be struck, and they continued to name Muhammadabad Banaras as the mint. It was only in 1819 that Nawab Ghaziuddin Haidar finally started to strike coins in his own name. Soon thereafter, Awadhi coins started to feature the kingdom's European style coat of arms.

The wars and transactions in which Shuja-ud-Daula was engaged, both with and against the British, led to the addition of Karra, Allahabad, Fatehgarh, Kanpur, Etawah, Mainpuri, Farrukhabad and Rohilkhand, to the Oudh dimensions, and thus they remained until the treaty of 1801 with Saadat Ali Khan, by which province was reduced considerably as half of Oudh was ceded to the EIC. Khairigarh, Kanchanpur, and what is now the Nepal Terai, were ceded in 1816, in liquidation of Ghazi ud din Haider's loan of a million sterling towards the expense of Nepal War; and at the same time pargana of Nawabganj was added to Gonda district in exchange for Handia, or Kawai, which was transferred from Pratapgarh to Allahabad.

=== British rule ===
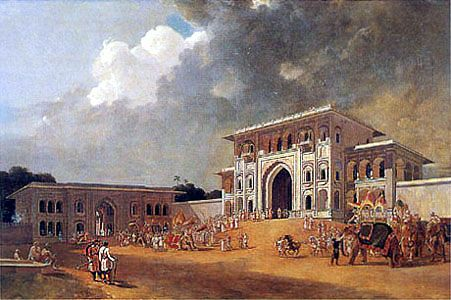
Gates of the Palace at Lucknow by W. Daniell, 1801

The treaty of 1801 formed an arrangement that was very beneficial to the company. They were able to use Awadh's vast treasuries, repeatedly digging into them for loans at reduced rates. In addition, the revenues from running Awadh's armed forces brought them useful revenues while it acted as a buffer state. The Nawabs were ceremonial kings, limited to pomp and show but with little influence over matters of state. By the mid-19th century, however, the British had grown impatient with the arrangement and wanted direct control. They started looking about for an excuse, which the powerless Nawabs had to provide. On 1 May 1816, a British protectorate was signed.

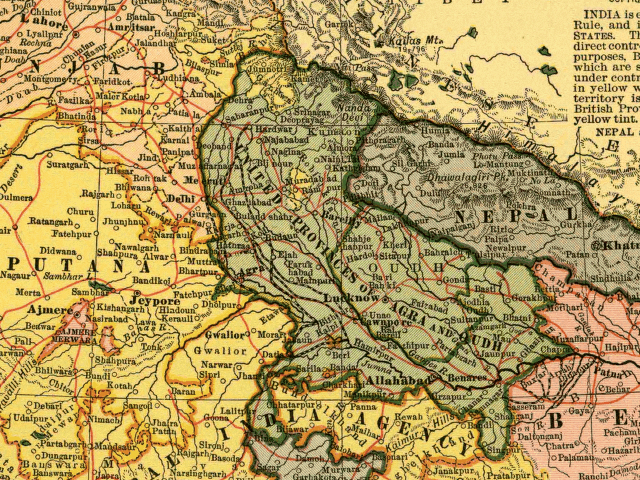
United Provinces of Agra and Oudh, 1903

In 1856 the East India Company invaded and annexed the state under the Doctrine of Lapse, which was placed under a Chief Commissioner. Wajid Ali Shah, the then Nawab, was imprisoned, and then exiled by the company to Calcutta (Bengal). In the subsequent Revolt of 1857, his 14-year-old son Birjis Qadra son of Begum Hazrat Mahal was crowned ruler, and Sir Henry Lawrence killed in the hostilities.

In the Indian Rebellion of 1857 (also known as the First War of Indian Independence and the Indian Mutiny), the rebels took control of Awadh, and it took the British 18 months to reconquer the region, months which included the famous Siege of Lucknow.

The Tarai to the north of Bahraich including large quantity of valuable forest and grazing ground, was made over to the Nepal Darbar in 1860, in recognition of their services during the Revolt of 1857, and in 1874 some further cessions, on a much smaller scale, but without any apparent reason, were made in favour of the same Government.

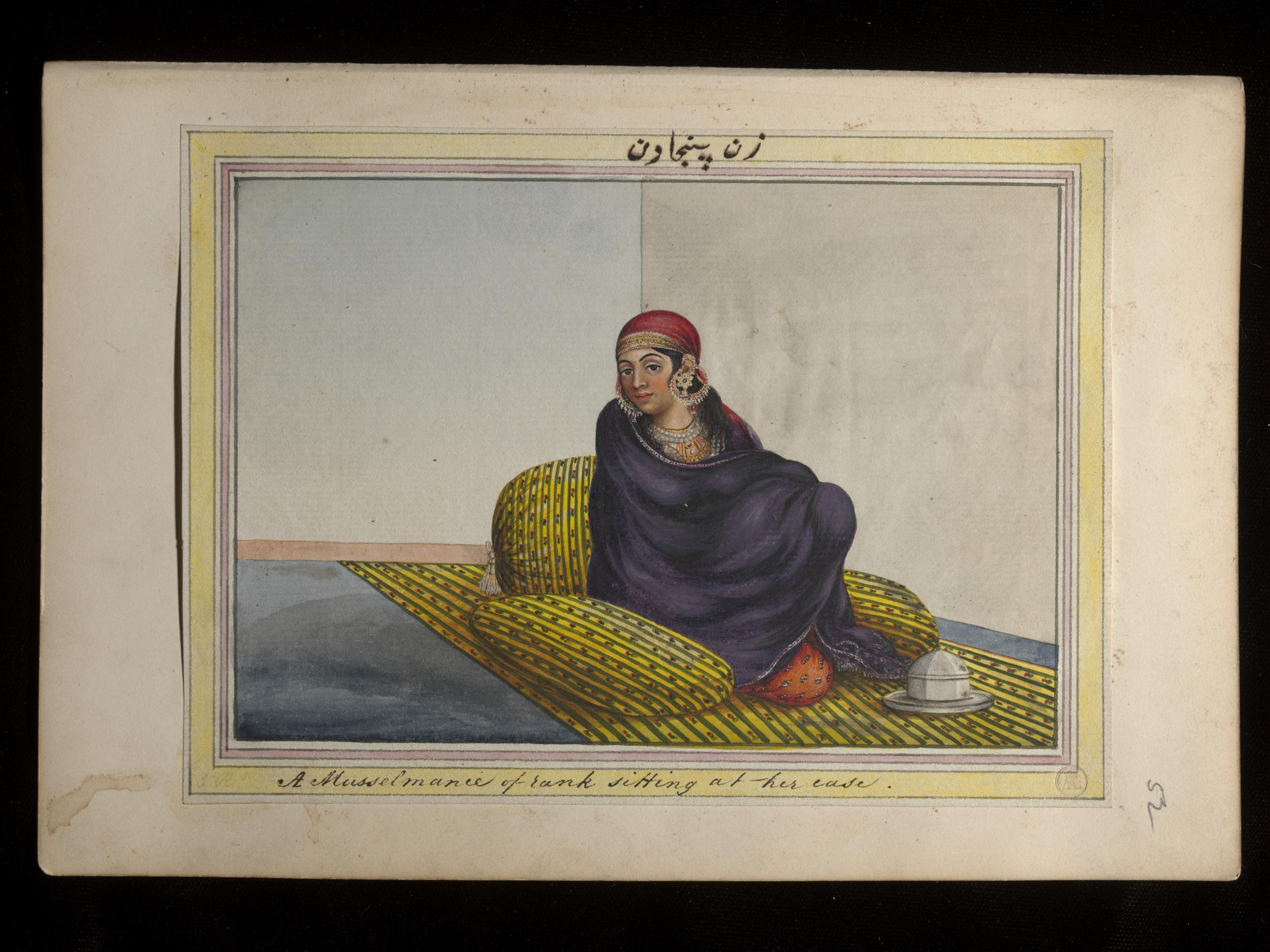
Muslim woman of rank at ease

In 1877 the offices of lieutenant-governor of the North-Western Provinces and chief commissioner of Oudh were combined in the same person; and in 1902, when the new name of United Provinces of Agra and Oudh was introduced, the title of chief commissioner was dropped, though Oudh still retained some marks of its former independence.

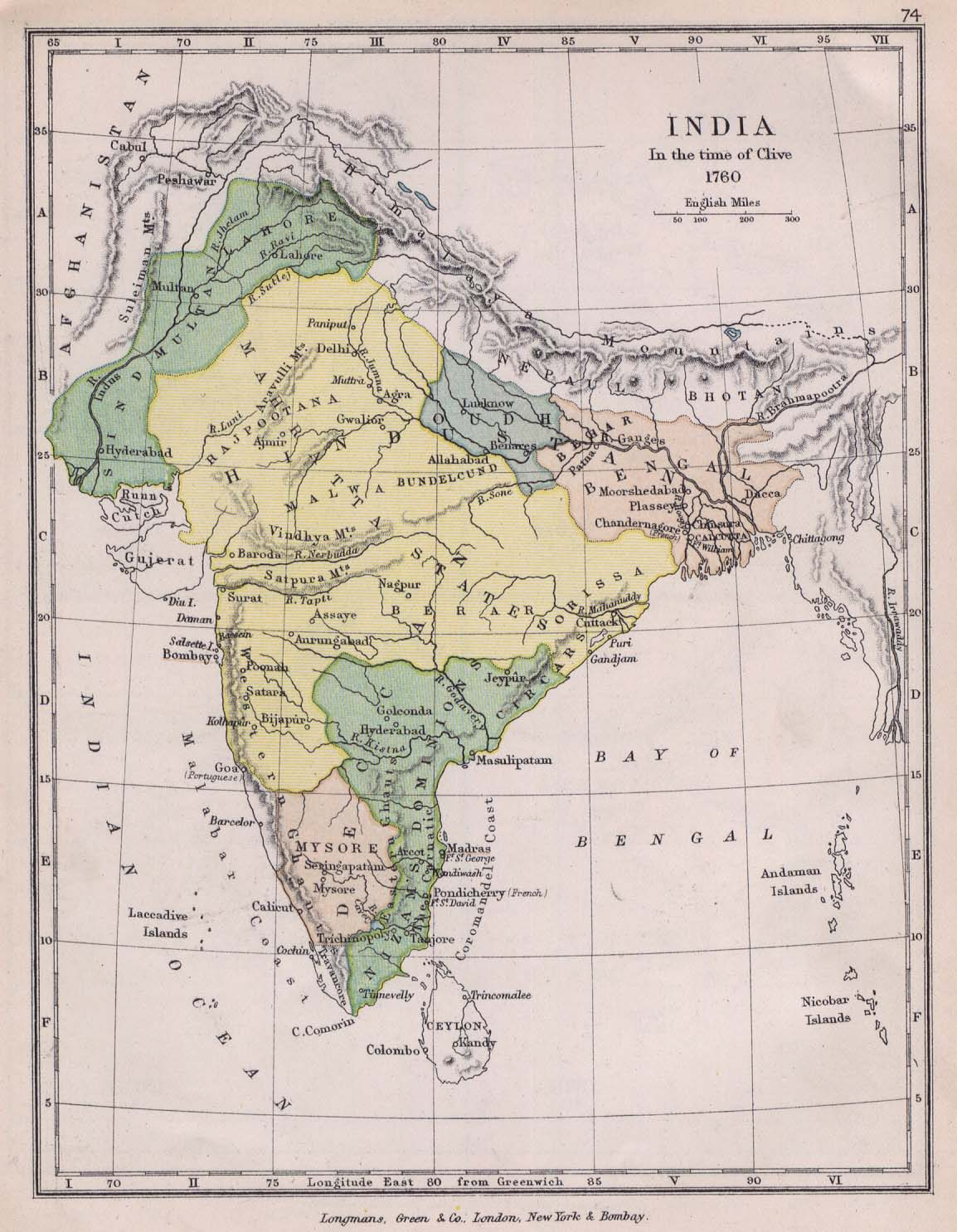
The fully-fledged state of Awadh

== Rulers ==
- Subadar Nawabs
  - 1732 – 19 March 1739 Borhan al-Molk Mir Mohammad Amin Musawi Sa`adat `Ali Khan I (b. c. 1680 – d. 1739)
  - 19 March 1739 – 28 April 1748 Abu´l Mansur Mohammad Moqim Khan (1st time) (b. c. 1708 – d. 1754)
- Nawab Wazir al-Mamalik
  - 28 April 1748 – 13 May 1753 Abu´l Mansur Mohammad Moqim Khan (s.a.) (acting to 29 June 1748)
- Subadar Nawabs
  - 5 November 1753 – 5 October 1754 Abu´l Mansur Mohammad Moqim Khan (s.a.) (2nd time)
  - 5 October 1754 – 15 February 1762 Jalal ad-Din Shoja` ad-Dowla Haydar (b. 1732 – d. 1775)
- Nawab Wazir al-Mamalik
  - 15 February 1762 – 26 January 1775 Jalal ad-Din Shoja` ad-Dowla Haydar (s.a.)
  - 26 January 1775 – 21 September 1797 Asaf ad-Dowla Amani (b. 1748 – d. 1797)
  - 21 September 1797 – 21 January 1798 Mirza Wazir `Ali Khan (b. 1780 – d. 1817)
  - 21 January 1798 – 11 July 1814 Yamin ad-Dowla Nazem al-Molk Sa`adat `Ali Khan II Bahadur (b. bf. 1752 – d. 1814)
  - 11 July 1814 – 19 October 1818 Ghazi ad-Din Rafa`at ad-Dowla Abu´l-Mozaffar Haydar Khan (b. 1769 – d. 1827)
- Kings (title Padshah-e Awadh, Shah-e Zaman)
  - 19 October 1818 – 19 October 1827 Ghazi ad-Din Mo`izz ad-Din Abu´l-Mozaffar Haydar Shah (s.a.)
  - 19 October 1827 – 7 July 1837 Naser ad-Din Haydar Solayman Jah Shah (b. 1803 – d. 1837)
  - 7 July 1837 – 17 May 1842 Mo`in ad-Din Abu´l-Fath Mohammad `Ali Shah (b. 1777 – d. 1842)
  - 17 May 1842 – 13 February 1847 Naser ad-Dowla Amjad `Ali Thorayya Jah Shah (b. 1801 – d. 1847)
  - 13 February 1847 – 7 February 1856 Naser ad-Din `Abd al-Mansur Mohammad Wajed `Ali Shah (b. 1822 – d. 1887)
  - 5 July 1857 – 3 March 1858 Berjis Qadr, son of the above (in rebellion) (b. c. 1845 – d. 1893)

== Demographics ==
=== Religion ===
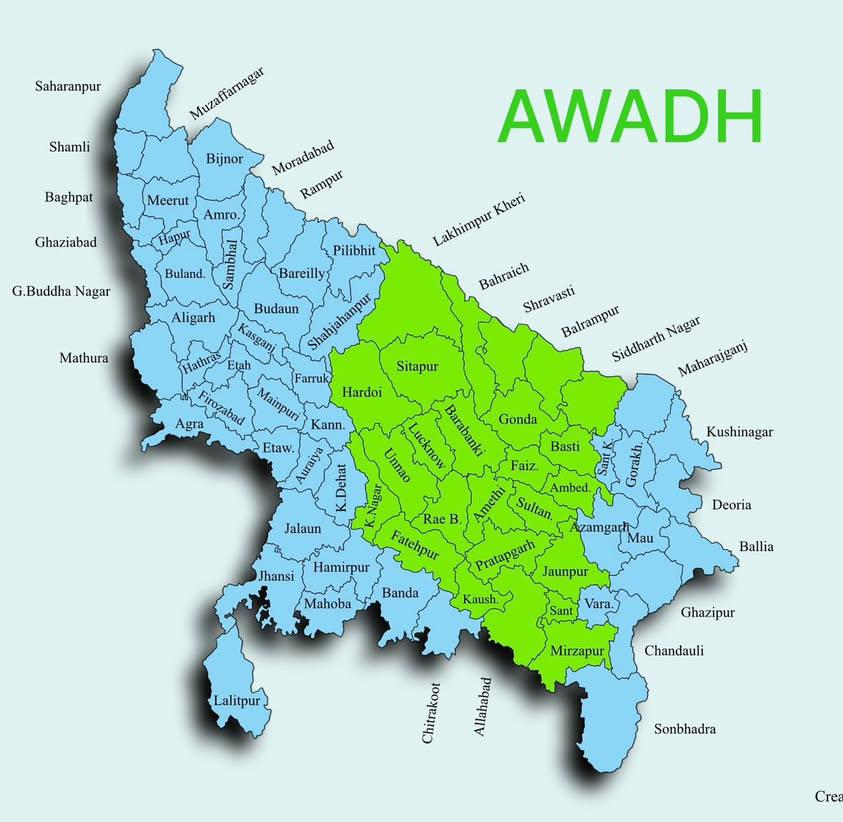
Awadhi speaking districts

A vast majority of the population practices Hinduism. It is also home to the city of Ayodhya, an important pilgrimage site in Hinduism and Jainism, among the seven holy cities of Hinduism (the Sapta Puri), where several Thirthankaras and the deity Rama were born. The Muslim community has a strong presence in the urban areas of Awadh, such as Prayagraj and the capital city of Lucknow, which has a large Shia Muslim population. Other than that they are mostly concentrated in the Devipatan division.

== Culture ==
The region of Awadh is considered to be the center of Ganga-Jamuni culture and is the home of for Awadhi music and Folkarts.

=== Sham-e-Awadh ===
Sham-e-Awadh is a popularised term referring to the "glorious evenings" in the Awadh capitals of Faizabad and later (and even today and to a greater extent) Lucknow.

Awadh was established in 1722. with Faizabad as its capital. Nawab Shuja-ud-Daula's son Nawab Asaf-ud-Daula, the fourth Nawab of Awadh, shifted the capital from Faizabad to Lucknow; this led to the decline of Faizabad and rise of Lucknow.

Just as Banares (Varanasi) is known for its mornings, so Lucknow is for its evenings. Many of its well-known buildings were erected on the banks of the Gomti River in the time of Nawabs. The Nawabs used to take in a view of the river Gomti and its architecture in the evening hours, giving rise to Sham-e-Awadh's romantic reputation.

There is a saying:'Subah-e-Benares', 'Sham-e-Awadh', 'Shab-e-Malwa' meaning mornings of the Benares, evenings of the Awadh and nights of Malwa.

=== Awadhi cuisine ===
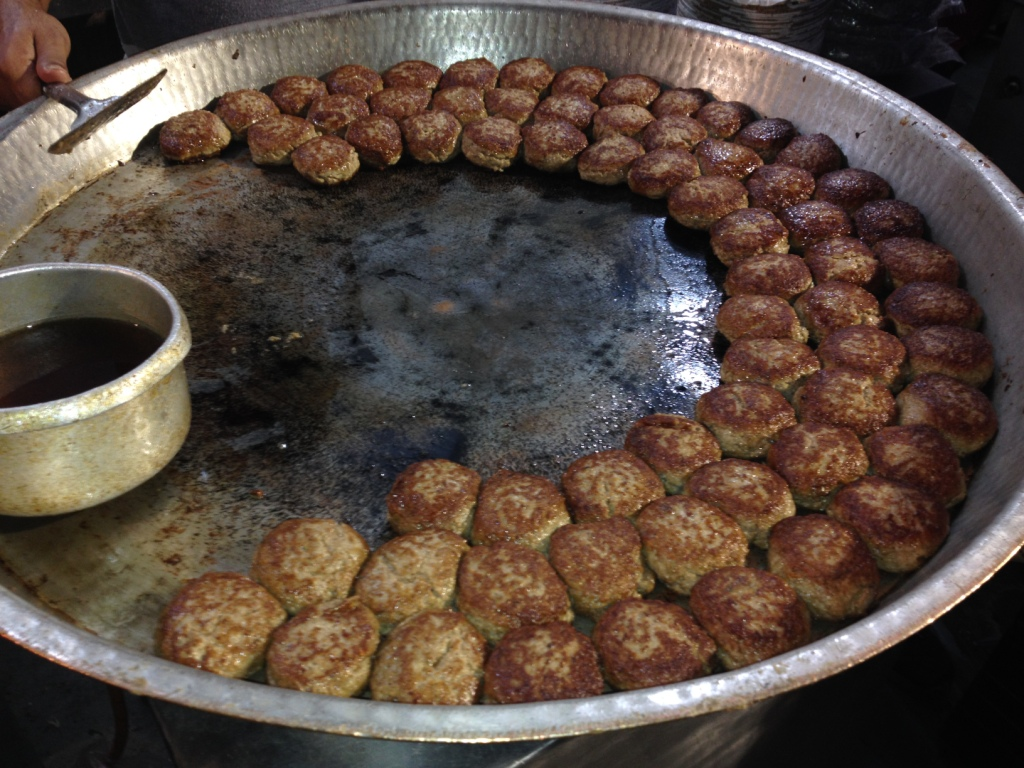
Kebabs are an important part of Awadhi cuisine

Awadhi Cuisine is primarily from the city of Lucknow and its environs. The cooking patterns of the city are similar to those of Central Asia, the Middle East, and Northern India as well. The cuisine consists of both vegetarian and non-vegetarian dishes. Awadh has been greatly influenced by Mughal cooking techniques, and the cuisine of Lucknow bears similarities to those of Kashmir, Punjab and Hyderabad; and the city is famous for its Nawabi foods.

The bawarchis and rakabdars of Awadh gave birth to the dum style of cooking or the art of cooking over a slow fire, which has become synonymous with Lucknow today. Their spread would consist of elaborate dishes like kebabs, kormas, biryani, kaliya, nahari-kulchas, zarda, sheermal, Taftan, roomali rotis and warqi parathas. The richness of Awadh cuisine lies not only in the variety of cuisine but also in the ingredients used like mutton, paneer, and rich spices including cardamom and saffron.

=== In popular culture ===
The events surrounding the 1856 overthrow of Wajid Ali Shah and the annexation of Awadh by the British are depicted in the 1977 film The Chess Players by the acclaimed Indian director Satyajit Ray. This film is based on famous Urdu story Shatranj Ke Khilari by the great Hindi-Urdu novelist writer Munshi Premchand.

The 1961 film Gunga Jumna is portrayed in Awadh and was noted for its use of the Awadhi dialect in mainstream Hindi cinema.

The novel Umrao Jaan Ada as well as the subsequent films are based on two cultural cities of Awadh, Lucknow and Faizabad.

The region has been in the center of various period films of Bollywood and modern films like Main, Meri Patni Aur Woh and Paa to name a few. It has also been shot in various songs of Bollywood.

== See also ==
- Nawab of Awadh
- List of chief commissioners of Oudh
- House of Tulsipur
- Pasi
- Baruwar (Rajput clan)
