= Arbar =

Arbar was one of the five main divisions of the kingdom of Rama in prehistoric Awadh. Arbar extended southwards from Gomti to the Sai River.

== See also ==
- Uttara Kosala
- Silliana
- Pachhimrath
- Purabrath
