= Phulhar Lake =

- Gomat Lake
- Location within Uttar Pradesh
- Location: Pilibhit district, Uttar Pradesh, India
- Coordinates: 28°36′44.78″N 80°6′59.28″E
- Type: Natural Lake/(Impact Crater)
- Primary inflows: Gomti River
- Basin countries: India
- Max. length: 4.5 km (2.8 mi)
- Surface area: 34.32 km^{2} (13.25 sq mi)
- Frozen: Never
- Islands: None

Phulhar Lake, also known as Pangaiti Phulhar Tal or Gomat Tal, is a lake located near Madhotanda in Pilibhit district of Uttar Pradesh. Gomti River is believed to originate from this lake.

== Geography ==
The Gomti River, fed by monsoons and groundwater, begins its journey at Phulahar Lake, near Madhotanda. This lake is home to several turtle species and has prompted the development of a turtle conservation initiative. Phulahar Lake is home to 12 turtle species out of the 26 found in India, with seven of them being listed in schedule I of the Wildlife Protection Act, 1972. Notably, the lake hosts a substantial population of the Indian softshell turtle, which is one of the schedule I species.
