= Malyavat Mountains =

Mountain range in India

Malyavat Mountains is a mountain range described in the epic Ramayana. It is identified as the part of the mountain ranges on the east coast of India (Eastern Ghats) that falls in the northern Tamil Nadu and southern Andhra Pradesh. Hanuman and Vanaras crossed this mountain during their wanderings in search of Sita, the wife of Rama. On their return journey from Lanka to Kosala, Rama and Sita saw these mountain ranges.
