= Pachhimrath =

Pachhimrath was one of the five main divisions of the kingdom of Rama in prehistoric Awadh. Pachhimrath may be roughly described as the country between Ghaghra and Gomti west to the line from Ayodhya to Sultanpur. This division included about third of present district of Faizabad (including Ambedkarnagar), a small portion of the north of Sultanpur, greater part of Barabanki, and sections of the Lucknow and Sitapur districts.

== See also ==
- Uttara Kosala
- Silliana
- Purabrath
- Arbar
