= Purabrath =

Purabrath was one of the five main divisions of the kingdom of Rama in prehistoric Awadh. Purabrath may be roughly described as the country between Ghaghra and Gomti east to the line from Ayodhya to Sultanpur. This division included about two-thirds of present district of Faizabad (including Ambedkarnagar), at the north-eastern corner of Sultanpur, and parts of Azamgarh and Jaunpur.

== See also ==
- Uttara Kosala
- Silliana
- Pachhimrath
- Arbar
