= Silliana =

Silliana or Saliana was one of the five main divisions of the kingdom of Rama in prehistoric Awadh. Silliana consisted of the lower range of hills to the north of Uttara Kosala, now belonging to Nepal, with the Tarai at its base.

== See also ==
- Pachhimrath
- Purabrath
- Arbar
