= INS Gomati =

The following ships of the Indian Navy have been named Gomati:

- INS Gomati (D93) was a Type II Hunt-class destroyer, formerly HMS Lamerton of the Royal Navy where it served during World War II, and commissioned into the Indian Navy in 1953
- INS Gomati (F21) is a Godavari-class frigate, currently in active service with the Indian Navy
