= Umrao Jaan =

Umrao Jaan is the titular heroine, a courtesan from Lucknow, in the 1899 Urdu novel Umrao Jaan Ada by Indian writer Mirza Hadi Ruswa.

Umrao Jaan may also refer to the novel's adaptations:

- Umrao Jaan Ada (film), a 1972 Pakistani film
- Umrao Jaan (1981 film), a Bollywood film
- Umrao Jaan (2006 film), a Bollywood film
- Umrao Jaan Ada (TV series), a Pakistani TV series
