= Kosala kingdom =

Ancient Hindu Kingdom

Kosala is the kingdom of Rama mentioned in the Ramayana. Ayodhya was its capital and is now located in Uttar Pradesh. Rama's sons Lava and Kusha inherited parts of this kingdom. Lava ruled from the city called Shravasti, and Kusa from the city called Kushavati. A colony of Kosala kings existed in Madhya Pradesh. It was called Dakshina Kosala. Rama's mother Kausalya was from this kingdom. Rama extended his influence up to the island-kingdom of Lanka situated in the Indian Ocean. He had friendly relations with the southern kingdom of Kishkindha.

Nishadha king Nala's friend Rituparna was a ruler of Kosala. Brihadbala another ruler of Kosala during Dvapara Yuga, took part in Mahabharata war and was killed by Abhimanyu, the son of Arjuna.

An 1880 reference described Uttara Kosala was one of the five main divisions of the kingdom of Rama in prehistoric Awadh; the region was described as corresponding to the modern trans-Ghaghra districts including Bahraich, Gonda, Basti and Gorakhpur.

== Kosala Kingdom through the ages ==
Kosala Kingdom Mahajanapada was one of sixteen most powerful and vast kingdoms and republics of the era, located mainly across the fertile Indo-Gangetic plains, there were a number of smaller kingdoms stretching the length and breadth of Ancient India.

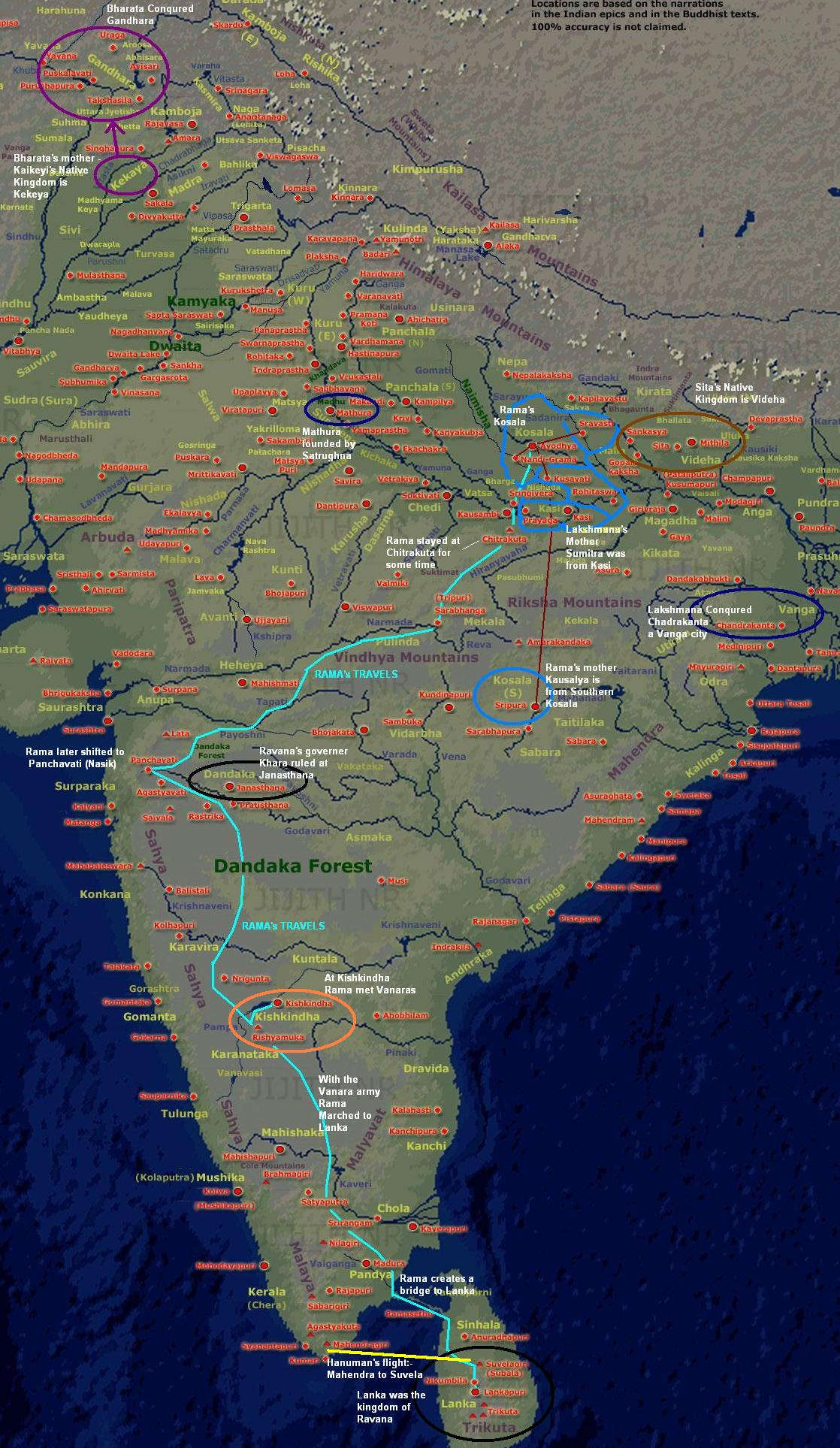
Places Related to Rama and Kosala

=== Era of Treta Yuga ===
The Indian epic Ramayana is the window to this era.

==== Kosala proper and Dakshina (southern) Kosala ====
During the period of the forefathers of Raghava Rama, there was only one Kosala kingdom. It had its capital at Ayodhya, identified as the Ayodhya town in Ayodhya in Uttar Pradesh state of India. During the reign of Dasharatha, the father of Rama, Dakshina Kosala came into prominence. It was situated in the Madhya Pradesh state of India. Dasharatha married his eldest wife Kausalya from this kingdom.

==== Kosala proper splits into two ====
Raghava Rama's son's Lava and Kusa, inherited each half of the Kosala kingdom, with Ayodhya as its capital. Thus, this Kosala split into two parts; one ruled by Lava, with capital at Shravasti, to the north of Ayodhya and the other by Kusa at Kusavati, believed to be towards the east of Ayodhya.

=== Era of Dvapara Yuga ===
The Indian epic Mahabharata is the window to this era.

During the time of Kurukshetra War, and the reign of Pandavas and Kauravas, we find mention of numerous kingdoms with the name, Kosala (as per the references in Mahabharata).

==== Kingdoms that sprang from Kosala proper ====
Raghava Rama's Kosala (Kosala proper) was already split into two, owing to his two sons attaining kingship after his reign. During the era of Kurukshetra War it was split into five kingdoms.

===== Eastern Kosala =====
This was, probably the kingdom ruled by Kusa, with Kusavati as its capital. (see MBh 2.14, Mbh 2.21, referred below). They were described as fleeing to the southern country of Kuntis due to Magadha king Jarasandha. The route was taken by Bhima, Arjuna and Krishna from Kuru Kingdom to Magadha Kingdom was through this Eastern Kosala.

===== Northern Kosala =====
This was, probably the kingdom ruled by Lava with Sravasti as its capital. (see MBh 2.29 referred below). This kingdom was defeated by the Pandava general Bhima, in his military campaign to the east.

===== Kosala kingdom of Vrihadvala to the south of Ayodhya =====
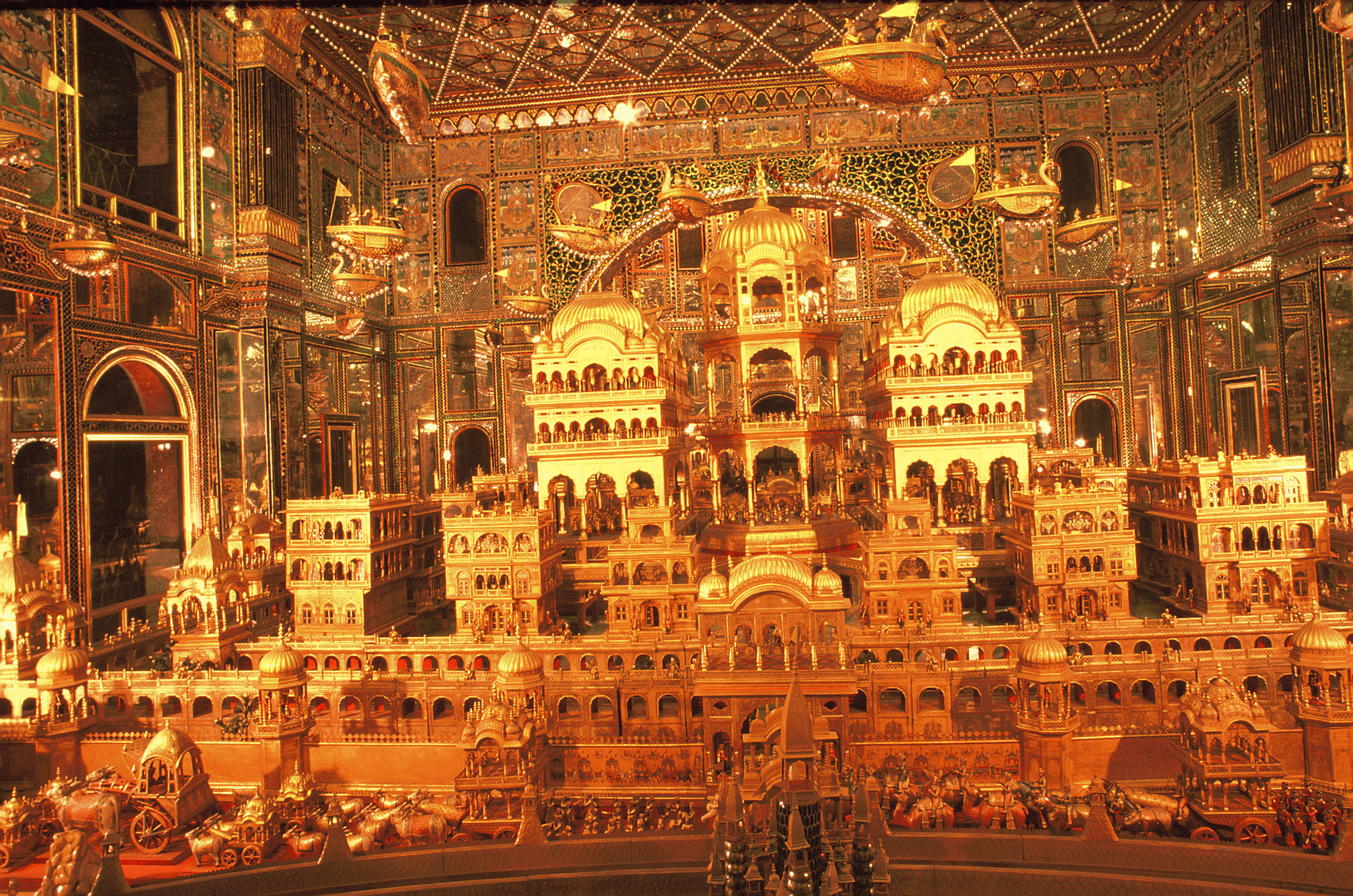
Gold carving depiction of the legendary Ayodhya at the Ajmer Jain temple.

Vriahadvala was a Kosala king mentioned as a general under Duryodhana, in the Kurukshetra War. (MBh. 5.277, 5.198). This kingdom was defeated by the Pandava general Bhima, in his military campaign to the east. (MBh 2.29). It seems that this Kosala had its power extended to the neighbouring kingdom of Kasi to the south of it, because Vrihadvala sometimes commanded the troops from Kasi also in Kurukshetra War. This probably was the reason to consider Kasi-Kosala as a single kingdom. For a period of time in the past, Kasi would have been a vassal state of Kosala kingdom. The grandmothers of Kauravas and Pandavas were called sometimes as princesses of Kasi and some times as princesses of Kosala, attesting to this fact.

===== Kosala with Ayodhya as its capital or central Kosala =====
This was the original Kosala ruled by king Raghava Rama. This was ruled by Dirghayaghna, during this era. This kingdom was defeated by the Pandava general Bhima, in his military campaign to the east. (MBh 2.29).

==== Kingdoms that sprang from the southern Kosala ====
The native kingdom of Raghava Rama's mother Kausalya, considered as Dakshina Kosala kingdom split at least into two during the era of Kurukshetra War. This became evident if we follow the passage in Mahabharata, describing the military campaign of the Pandava general Sahadeva, who led his troops to the southern direction. (MBh. 2.30)

===== Western Kosala in central India =====
This kingdom was close to the Vidarbha Kingdom ruled by Bhishmaka, probably to the east of it. Sahadeva defeated this kingdom first and moved to the Eastern Kosala. (MBh. 2.30)

===== Eastern Kosala in central India =====
After defeating the other Kosala kingdom Sahadeva defeated numerous kings in the Eastern Kosala, indicating that there were many kingdoms, and not one, however collectively known as Eastern Kosalas. (MBh. 2.30)

== References in Mahabharata ==
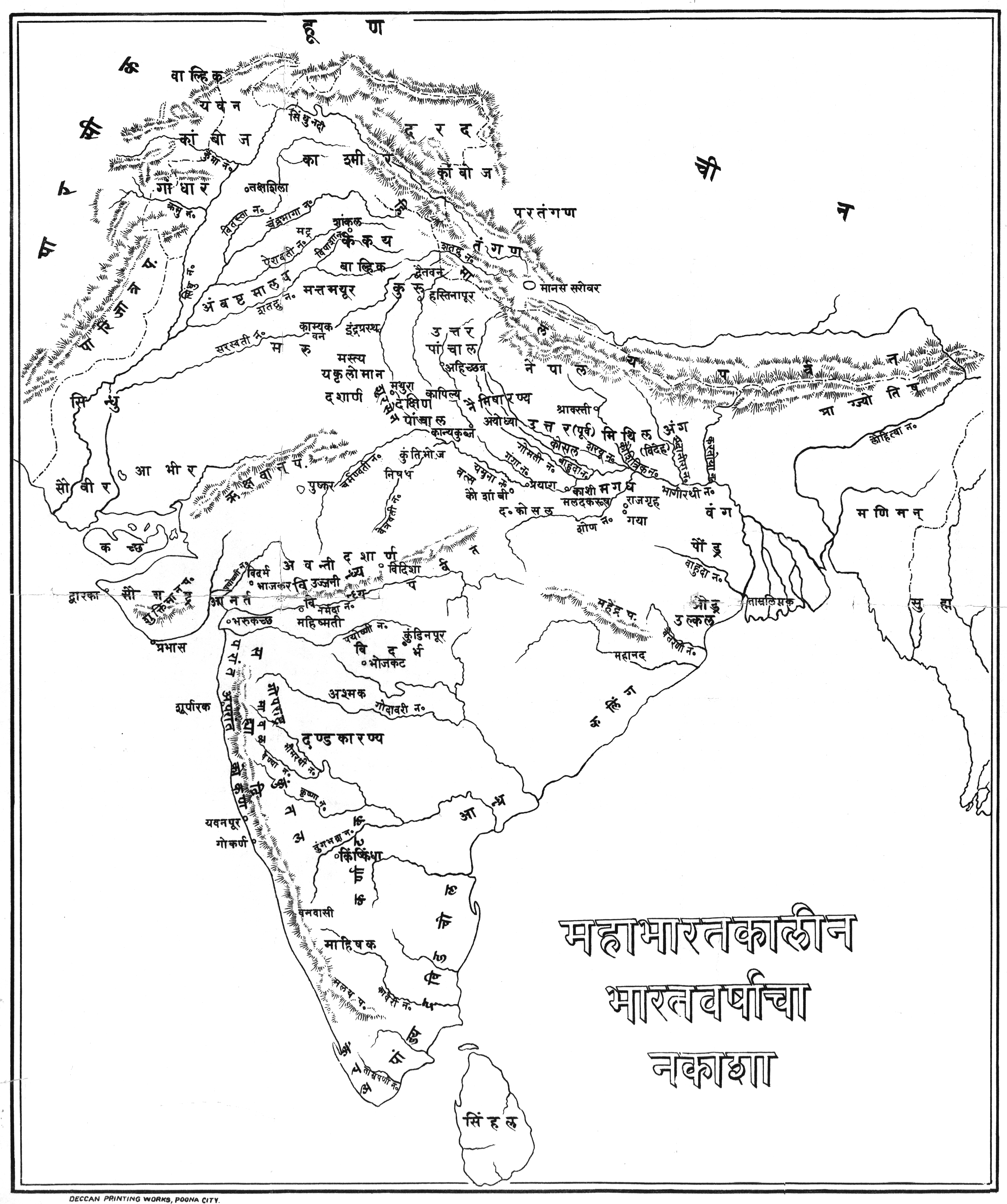
India during the Mahabharata

=== The mothers of Dhritarashtra and Pandu ===
- Mahabharata, Book 1, Chapter 114

The mothers of Dhritarashtra and Pandu, viz Ambika and Ambalika, were described to be Kosala princesses. They were some times described as princesses from Kasi kingdom, Kasi and Kosala being a single kingdom (often denoted as Kasi-Kosalas) during the time of Mahabharata.

Then Satyavati and Bhishma and the Kosala princesses were all gratified with the presents Pandu made out of the acquisitions of his prowess. And Ambalika in particular, upon embracing her son of incomparable prowess, became very glad.

=== The self-choice event of Panchali ===
- Mahabharata, Book 1, Chapter 188

Kosala king was present in this event

...the highly intelligent Vatsaraja, the king of Kosala, Shishupala and the powerful Jarasandha, these and many other great kings—all Kshatriyas celebrated throughout the world—have come, O blessed one (Panchali), for thee.

=== The impact of Magadha king on Kosala ===
- Mahabharata, Book 2, Chapter 14

The eighteen tribes of the Bhojas, from fear of (Magadha King) Jarasandha, have all fled towards the west; so also have the Surasenas, the Bhadrakas, the Vodhas, the Salwas, the Patachchavas, the Susthalas, the Mukuttas, and the Kulindas, along with the Kuntis. And the king of the Salwayana tribe with their brethren and followers; and the southern Panchalas and the eastern Kosalas have all fled to the country of the Kuntis. So also the Matsyas and the Sannyastapadas, overcome with fear, leaving their dominions in the north, have fled into the southern country. And so all the Panchalas, alarmed at the power of Jarasandha, have left their own kingdom and fled in all directions.

=== The trip from Kuru kingdom to Magadha kingdom ===
Route taken by Bhima, Arjuna and Krishna from Kuru kingdom to Magadha kingdom to meet Jarasandha as per Mahabharata

- Mahabharata, Book 2, Chapter 21

The following was a route taken by Krishna, Arjuna and Bhima to reach Magadha kingdom. It passes through the eastern Kosala kingdom.

Having set out from the country of the Kurus, they passed through Kuru-janapada and arrived at the charming lake of lotuses. Passing over the hills of Kalakuta, they then went on crossing the Gandaki, the Sadanira (Karatoya), and the Sarkaravarta and the other rivers taking their rise in the same mountains. They then crossed the delightful Sarayu and saw the country of Eastern Kosala. Passing over that country they went to Mithila and then crossing the Mala and Charamanvati, the three heroes crossed the Ganges and the Sone and went on towards the east. At last those heroes of unfaded glory arrived at Magadha in the heart of (the country of) Kushamva. Reaching then the hills of Goratha, they saw the city of Magadha.

=== Bhima's military campaign ===
- Mahabharata, Book 2, Chapter 29

Bhima then vanquished king Srenimat of the country of Kumara, and then Vrihadvala, the king of Kosala. Then the foremost of the sons of Pandu, by performing feats excelling in fierceness, defeated the virtuous and mighty king Dirghayaghna of Ayodhya. And the exalted one then subjugated the country of Gopalakaksha and the northern Kosalas and also the king of Mallas.

=== Sahadeva's military campaign ===
- Mahabharata, Book 2, Chapter 30

Sahadeva, vanquishing the invincible Bhishmaka, then defeated in battle the king of Kosala and the ruler of the territories lying on the banks of the Venwa, as also the Kantarakas and the kings of the eastern Kosalas.

=== Conversation of Nala and Damayanti ===
- Mahabharata, Book 3, Chapter 61

These many roads lead to the southern country, passing by (the city of) Avanti and the Rikshavat mountains. This is that mighty mountain called Vindhya; yon, the river Payasvini running seawards, and yonder are the asylums of the ascetics, furnished with various fruit and roots. This road leadeth to the country of the Vidarbhas—and that, to the country of the Kosalas. Beyond these roads to the south is the southern country.

=== Rituparna, King of Kosala visiting Vidharbha Kingdom ===
- Mahabharata, Book 3, Chapter 73

The ruler of the Vidarbhas, approaching Rituparna, said, ‘Welcome! What is the occasion of this thy visit?’ And king Bhima asked this without knowing that Rituparna had come to obtain the hand of his daughter. And king Rituparna, saw that there were no other kings or princes. Nor did he hear any talk relating to the Swayamvara, nor saw any concourse of Brahmanas. And at this, the king of Kosala reflected a while and at length said, ‘I have come here to pay my respects to thee.’ And the king Bhima was struck with astonishment, and reflected upon the (probable) cause of Rituparna's coming, having passed over a hundred yojanas.

=== Sacred places in Kosala kingdom ===
- Mahabharata, Book 3, Chapter 85

Sojourning next to the tirtha called Rishabha in Kosala and fasting there for three nights one earneth the merit of the Vajapeya sacrifice, and of the gift of a thousand kine, and also delivereth his race. Arriving at 'Kosala, a man should bathe in the tirtha named Kala.

=== Karna's military campaign ===
- Mahabharata, Book 3, Chapter 252

Having conquered the eastern quarter Karna then presented himself before Batsa-bhumi. And having taken Batsa-bhumi, he reduced Kevali, and Mrittikavati, and Mohana and Patrana, and Tripura, and Kosala,--and compelled all these to pay tribute.

=== Ramayana inside Mahabharata ===
- Mahabharata, Book 3, Chapter 277

Behold my plight! The loss of thy kingdom, and then the death of our father, and then the abduction of Sita, and finally this disaster that hath overwhelmed me! Alas, I shall not behold thee return with the princess of Videha to Kosala and seated on thy ancestral throne as the ruler of the entire Earth! They only that are fortunate will behold thy face, like unto the moon emerged from the clouds, after thy coronation bath in water sanctified with Kusa grass and fried paddy and black peas!’ And the intelligent Lakshmana uttered those and other lamentations in the same strain.

- Mahabharata, Book 3, Chapter 282

That descendant of Raghu, who ruleth at Kosala and whose renown hath spread over the whole world, sayeth unto thee these words suited to the occasion. Accept thou that message and act according to it.

=== Vrihadvala or Brihadbala, the ruler of Kosala ===
- Mahabharata, Book 5, Chapter 277

Bhishma rates the battle skills of every king who were to take part in the Kurukshetra War

Endued with great impetus and prowess, king Vrihadvala, the ruler of the Kosalas, is, in my judgment, equal to one Ratha (a grade of battle-skill).

=== Kosala king supported Duryodhana in the war ===
- Mahabharata, Book 5, Chapter 198

King Vrihadvala of Kosala, supported Duryodhana in the Kurukshetra War

Then came Kritavarman at the head of his troops, and that mighty car-warrior, viz., the ruler of the Trigartas, and the king Duryodhana surrounded by his brothers, and Sala, and Bhurisravas, and Salya, and Vrihadratha, the ruler of the Kosalas.

- Mahabharata, Book 6, Chapter 16

And Suvala's son Shakuni, and Salya, Jayadratha and the two princes of Avanti named Vinda and Anuvinda, and the Kekeya brothers, and Sudakshina the ruler of the Kamvojas and Srutayudha the ruler of the Kalingas, and king Jayatsena, and Vrihadvala the ruler of the Kosalas, and Kritavarman of Satwata's race,--these ten tigers among men, stood each at the head of an Akshauhini of troops. These and many other kings and princes, mighty car-warriors conversant with policy, obedient to the commands of Duryodhana, all cased in mail, were seen stationed in their respective divisions.

- Mahabharata, Book 6, Chapter 45

The mighty bowman Abhimanyu battled with Vrihadvala. Soon, however, in that encounter, O king, the ruler of Kosala cut off the standard and overthrew the charioteer of Subhadra's son. The son of Subhadra then upon the overthrow of his charioteer, was filled with wrath and pierced Vrihadvala

=== Abhimanyu slays Vrihadvala the king of Kosala ===
- Mahabharata, Book 7, Chapter 45

The ruler of the Kosala struck Abhimanyu, in the chest with a barbed arrow. Abhimanyu, however, quickly felled on the earth his antagonist's steeds and standard and bow and charioteer. The ruler of the Kosalas, then, thus deprived of his car, took up a sword and wished to sever from Abhimanyu's trunk his beautiful head, decked with ear-rings. Abhimanyu then pierced king Vrihadvala, the ruler of the Kosalas, in the chest, with a strong arrow. The latter then, with riven heart, fell down. Beholding this, ten thousand illustrious kings broke and fled. Those kings, armed with swords and bows, fled away, uttering words inimical (to king Duryodhana's Interest). Having slain Vrihadvala thus, the son of Subhadra careered it battle.

=== Connection with Saraswati civilization ===
- Mahabharata, Book 9, Chapter 38

It was on that sacred region, the northern part of Kosala, that the sacrifice of high-souled Auddalaka was performed. Before Auddalaka began his sacrifice, he had thought of the Sarasvati River. That foremost of rivers came to that region for the sake of those Rishis. Worshipped by all those Munis clad in barks and deer-skins she became known by the name of Manorama, as those Rishis mentally called her.

=== Arjuna's post-war military campaign ===
- Mahabharata, Book 14, Chapter 82

The sacrificial horse then, equipped with beautiful manes, proceeded at his will along the sea-coast, repairing to the countries of the Bangas, the Pundras, and the Kosalas. In those realms Dhananjaya (Arjuna), with his bow Gandiva, vanquished innumerable Mlechecha armies one after another

- Mahabharata, Book 14, Chapter 83

That best of steeds then proceeded to the realms of the Kasis, the Angas, the Kosalas, the Kiratas, and the Tanganas.

=== Other references in Mahabharata ===
- Mahabharata, Book 12, Chapter 18

Mention of a Janaka king of Videha, with a wife from Kosala

- Mahabharata, Book 12, Chapter 67

There was a king of Kosala possessed of great intelligence, named Vasumanas.

- Mahabharata, Book 12, Chapter 81

It hath been heard by us that once on a time the sage Kalakavrikshiya came to Kshemadarsin who had ascended the throne of the kingdom of Kosala.

- Mahabharata, Book 13, Chapter 6

Saudasa, the king of Kosala, though dignified by the performance of Ashwamedha and other sacrifices, obtained the status of a man-eating Rakshasa, through the curse of a great Rishi.

Krishna is also described to have married a princess of Kosala - Nagnajiti - who was the daughter of King Nagnajit of Ayodhya.

== See also ==
- Mahajanapadas
- Pachhimrath
- Silliana
- Purabrath
- Arbar
- List of wars involving Magadha
