= Madhotanda =

- town
- Location in Uttar Pradesh, India
- Coordinates: 28.62°N 80.1°E
- Country: India
- State: Uttar Pradesh
- District: Pilibhit
- Elevation: 184 m (604 ft)

Population (2015)
  - Total: 9,700

Languages
  - Official: Hindi
- Time zone: UTC+5:30 (IST)

Madhotanda is a town in Pilibhit district in the Indian state of Uttar Pradesh. Which is known for being the origin of River Gomti from a small pond here. Madhotanda is a prominent place of Rathore Thakur (Kshtriya) caste of Hindus.

== Geography ==
Madhotanda is located at 28.62°N 80.1°E. It has an average elevation of 184 metres (603 feet). It is gateway of proposed Pilibhit tigar reserve.

== Demographics ==
As of the 2001 Census of India, Madhotanda had a population of 8,746. Males constitute 53% of the population and females 47%. Madhotanda has an average literacy rate of 34%, lower than the national average of 59.5%: male literacy is 45%, and female literacy is 22%. In Madhotanda, 20% of the population is under 6 years of age.

== Places of interest ==
Madhotanda is located near famous Chuka Beach and Bifercation. It is very much rich in wildlife and you can see tiger, elephants, deer very easily. Despite the low literacy rate, the area has given birth to many doctors, engineers, professors and industrialists.
