= Gomti Chakra =

Rare sea snail operculum

Gomathi Chakra is the operculum of a kind of rare sea snail in the family Turbinidae.‌ One place these opercula are found is in the Gomathi River, Dwarka, hence the name. The word Chakra is from Sanskrit, meaning circular. These objects are considered sacred by Hindus, giving wealth, health, and success. Gomathi Chakra are also believed to give protection for children.

== Etymology ==
Gomathi refers to the Gomathi river from where it is found and chakra means circular. It is also known as Cats 's eye shell, Naag-Chakra or Cows 's eye shell.

== Usage ==
Gomathi Chakra is also used in jewellery. It was used by the ancient Celts and Greeks also.

=== Religious importance ===
It is considered holy by Hindus. It is believed to give protection for children.
