= Gomti River =

River in India

Gomti River Gumti River
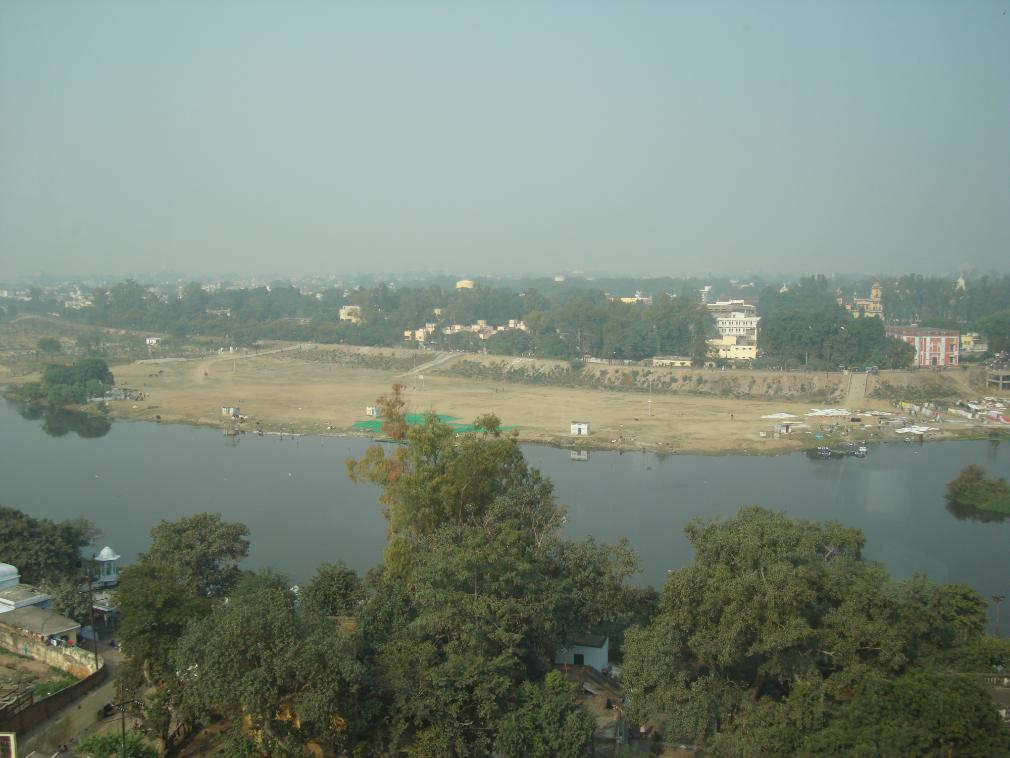
- Gomti River at Lucknow

Location
- Country: India

Physical characteristics
- Source: Gomat Taal, MadhoTanda, Pilibhit, Uttar Pradesh
  - location: Middle Ganga Plain
  - coordinates: 25°36′44″N 80°6′59.28″E
  - elevation: 200 m (660 ft)
- Length: 960 km (600 mi)
- Discharge
  - location: Kaithi, Varanasi Uttar Pradesh
  - average: 234 m^{3}/s (8,300 cu ft/s)

Basin features
- Tributaries
  - right: Sai

The Gomti, Gumti or Gomati River is a river flowing entirely within the Indian state of Uttar Pradesh. It is a tributary of the Ganges.

The river, fed by monsoons and groundwater, begins its journey at the Gomat Taal, near Madhotanda, in Pilibhit district. It then reaches a confluence with the smaller Gaihaaee 20 kilometres (12 mi) from its origin. The Gomti is a narrow stream until it reaches Mohammadi Kheri, a tehsil of Lakhimpur Kheri district (about 68 kilometres (42 mi)from its origin), where it is joined by a number of tributaries, notably the Sukheta, Choha and Andhra Choha. By that point, the river is well-defined, with the Kathina tributary joining it at Mailani and Sarayan joining it at a village in Sitapur district. A major tributary is the Sai River, which joins the Gomti near Jaunpur. The Markandey Mahadeo temple lies at the confluence of the Gomti and the Ganges.

After flowing for 190 kilometres (120 mi) the Gomti enters Lucknow, meandering through the city for about 30 kilometres (19 mi) and supplying its water. In the Lucknow area, 25 city drains pour untreated sewage into the river. At the downstream end, the Gomti barrage converts the river into a lake.

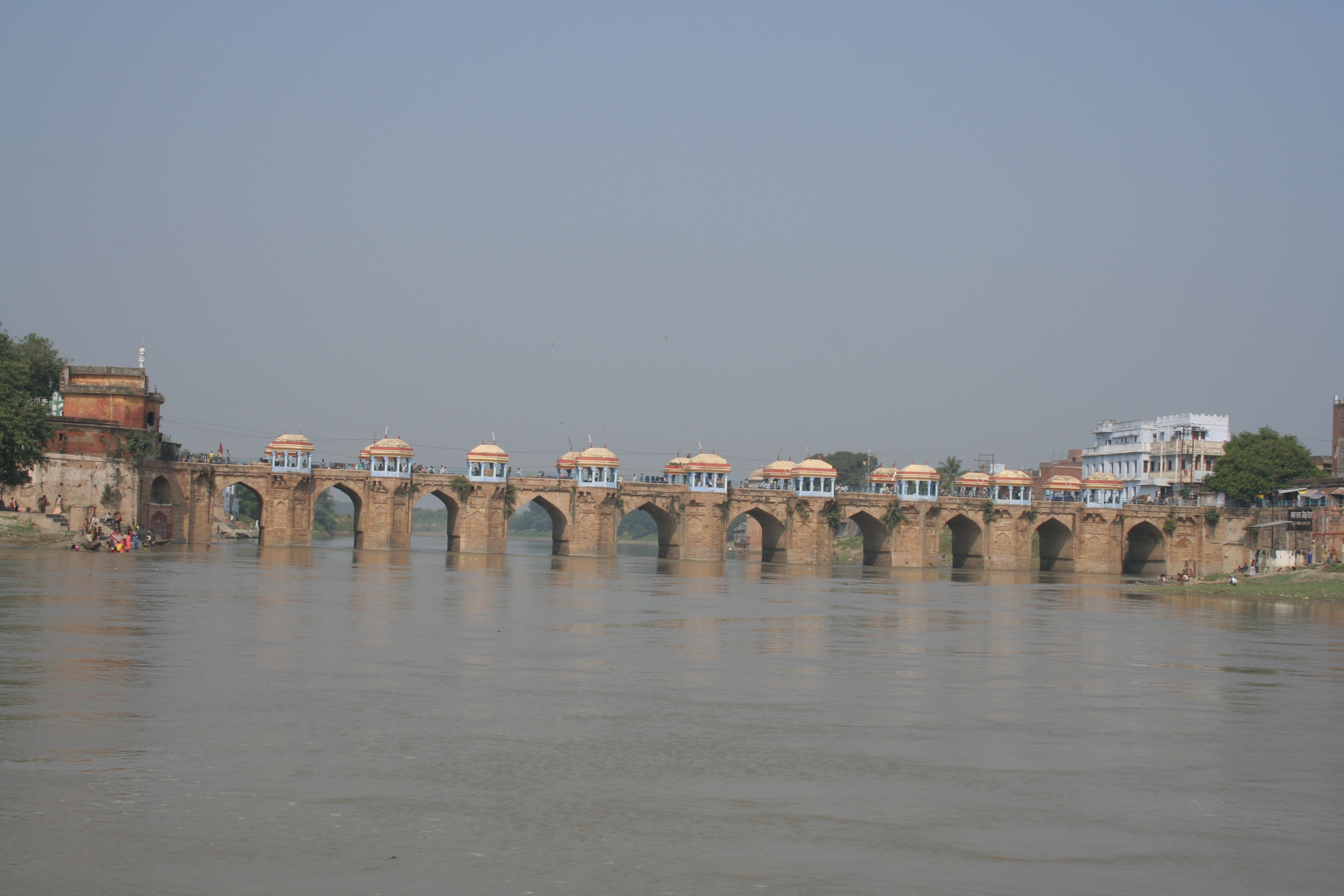
Mughal-era Shahi Bridge across Gomti in Jaunpur

In addition to Lucknow, Gola Gokaran Nath, Misrikh, Neemsar, Lakhimpur Kheri, Sultanpur Kerakat and Jaunpur, Zafarabad are the most prominent of the 20 towns in the river's catchment basin. The river cuts the Sultanpur district and Jaunpur in half, becoming wider in the city.

== Hindu belief ==
According to Hindu belief, the Gomti is the daughter of Rishi Vashishtha. Bathing in the river on Ekadashi (the 11th day of the two lunar phases of the Hindu calendar month) is thought to wash away sins. According to the Bhagavata Purana, one of Hinduism's major religious works, Gomti is one of the five transcendental rivers of India. The rare Gomti Chakra is found there.

== Pollution ==
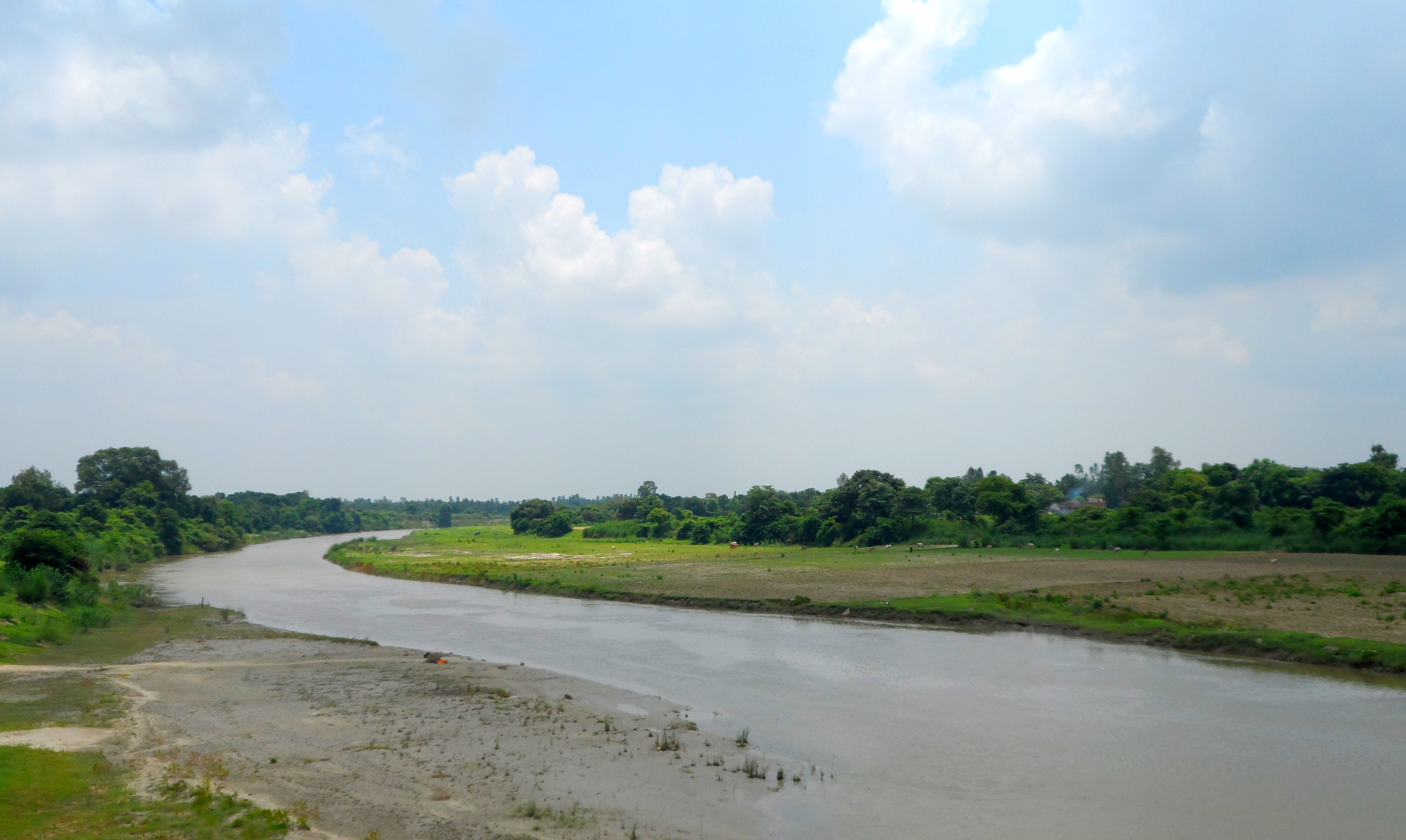
The Gomti in Sitapur district

The Gomti River is polluted at several points of its course through the 940-kilometre (580 mi) stretch of alluvial plains in Uttar Pradesh. The major sources of pollution are industrial waste and effluent from sugar factories and distilleries and residential wastewater and sewage.

The river and its tributaries, particularly the Kukrail Drainage, collect large amounts of human and industrial pollutants as they flow through an area comprising about 18 million people. High pollution levels threaten the Gomti's aquatic life. On 25 July 2008, the foundation stone of a 345-million-litre (91,000,000 US gal)-capacity sewage treatment plant was laid.

The plant, promoted as Asia's largest, failed; in 2014 it was reportedly running at 10 percent of capacity, and beyond the plant (near Bharwara) untreated sewage and solid waste entered the river. The plant was intended to intercept the 23 major natural drains entering the Gomti.

== Riverfront development controversy ==
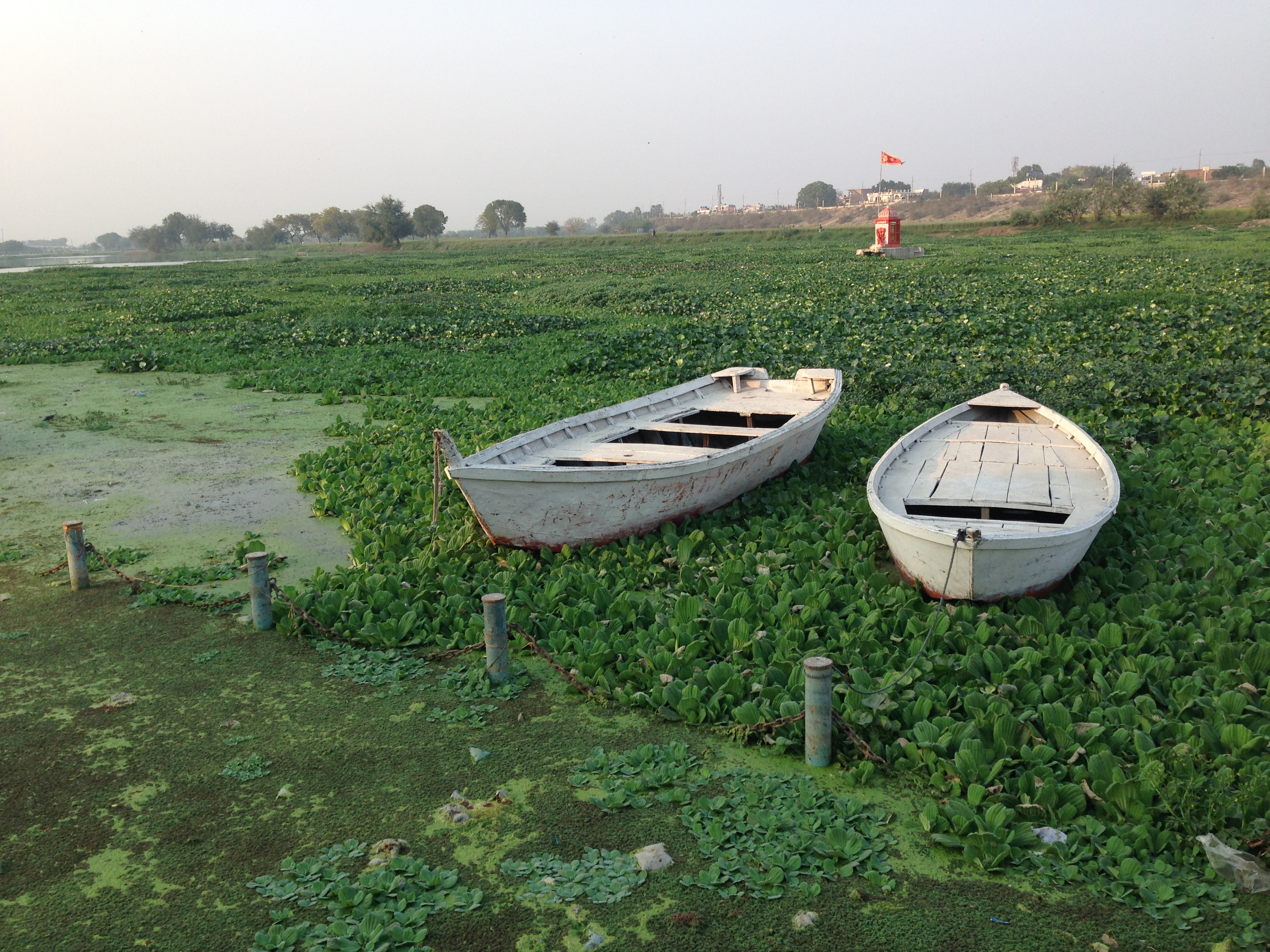
Temporary dam stopping the Gomti River for construction on the riverbed

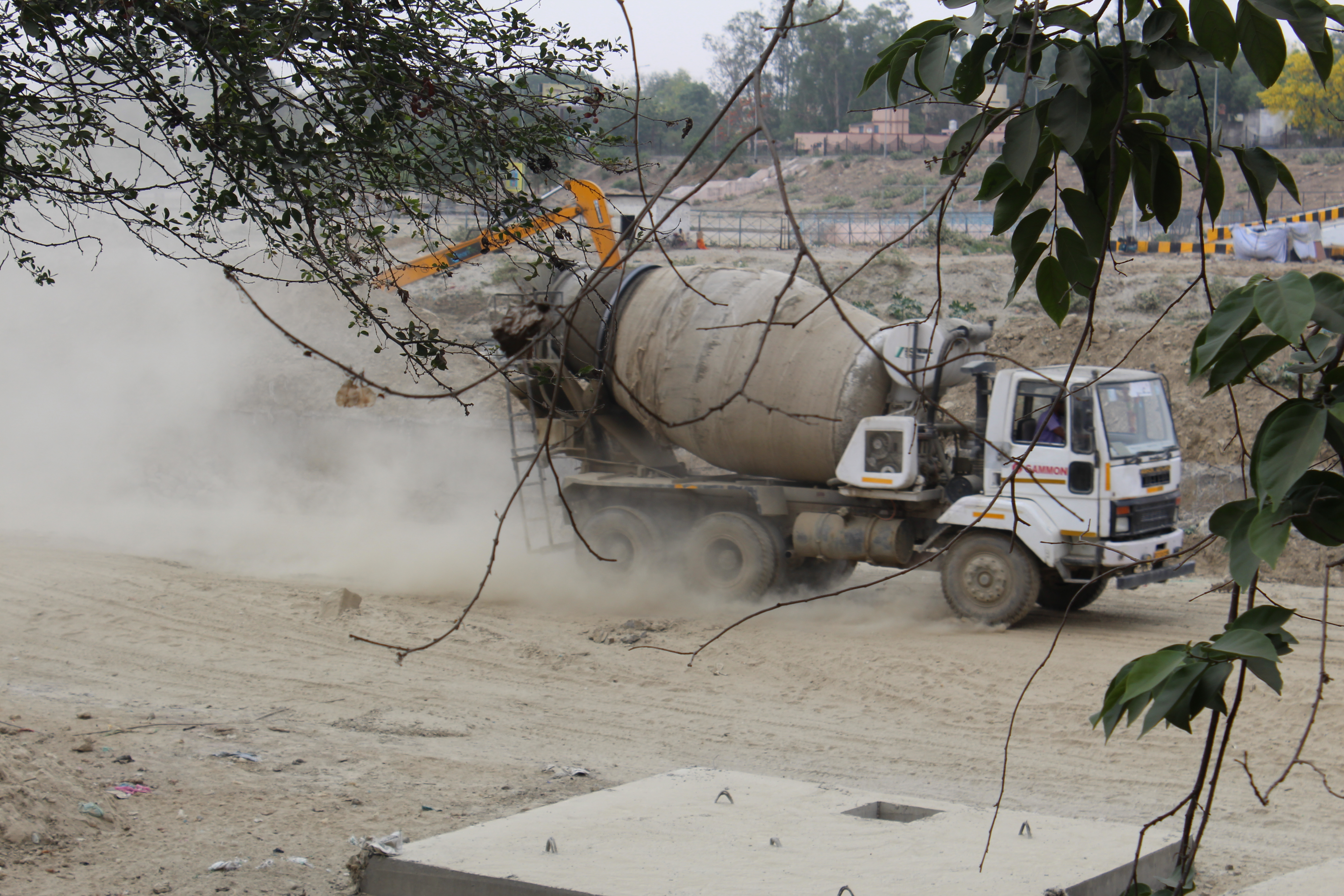
Gomti riverfront, with heavy machinery over the riverbed and floodplain

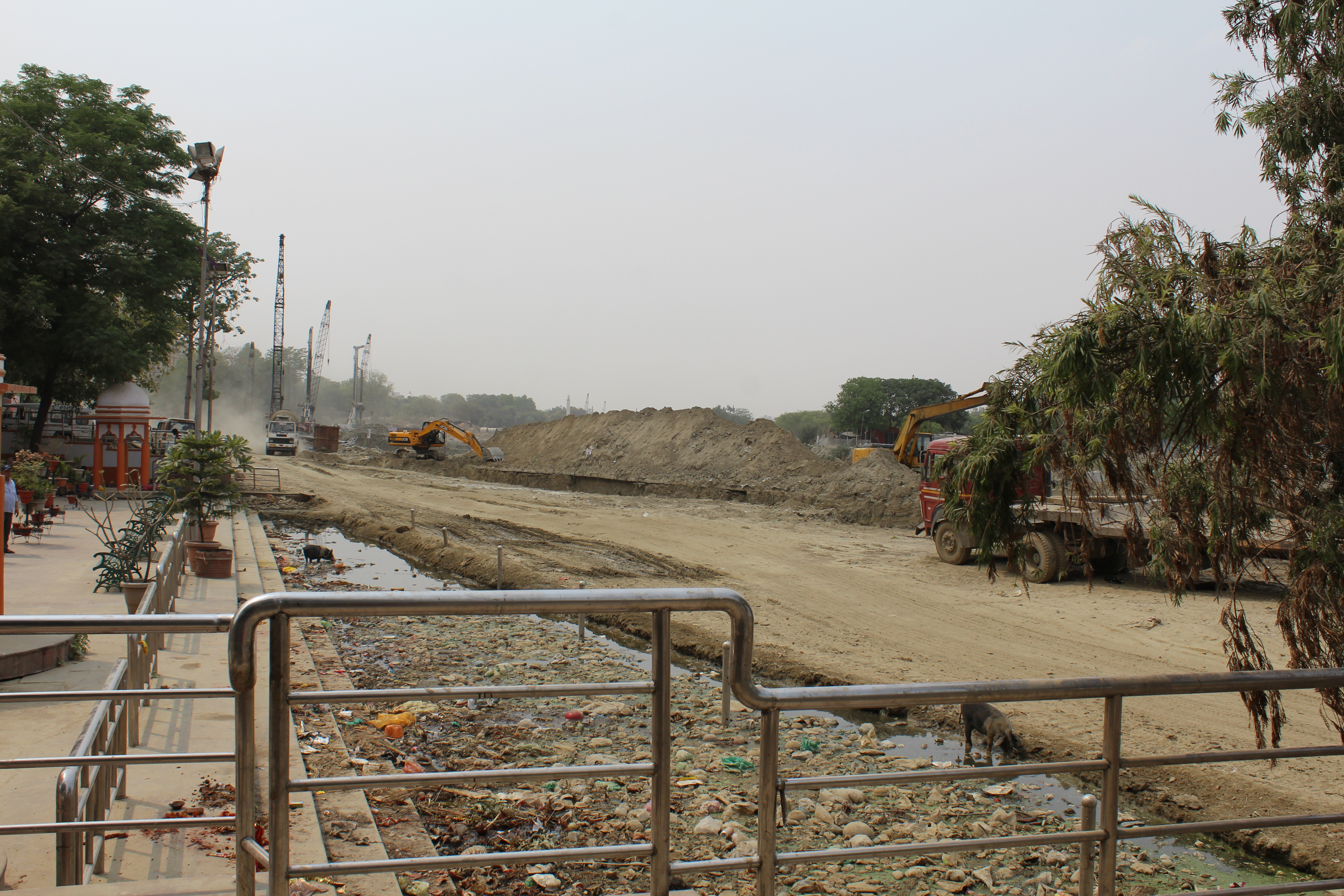
Gomti riverfront reclaimed riverbed and floodplain

The Gomti has been stressed, particularly in and around Lucknow, for decades. There are three major reasons for this:

1. Embankments - High embankments were built around the river to protect the population of Lucknow after a major flood during 1970s, altering the Gomti's natural floodplain.
2. Pollution - The Gomti has 40 natural drains, of which 23 are major. The drains, which carried surplus water into the river during the monsoon and recharged the underground water table, were reduced to carry residential and industrial sewage into the river.
3. Development - The river's floodplains and fertile land were covered with residential areas, such as Gomti Nagar and Triveni Nagar. The Gomti began receding during the late 1970s, and was under major stress in 2016.

Although government agencies planned major projects, such as the Bharwara sewage treatment plant and mechanical dredging, most were unsuccessful. The Gomti rises by 10–12 meters during the monsoon, and in 2008 a major flood was reported.

Around 2012, the newly-elected government and the Lucknow Development Authority began a feasibility study with the Indian Institute of Technology Roorkee to build a river-front similar to Sabarmati Riverfront in Ahmedabad. The LDA submitted the report, warning about the negative consequences of reducing the Gomti to less than 250 meters wide. At 250 meters wide (with walls on both sides), the river's velocity would increase by 20 percent and its bed-shear stress by 30 percent. Current embankments would have to be raised by 1.5 meters, and the high flood level (HFL) would increase by 1.25 meters. Two bridges would be threatened with collapse under flood conditions. The plan was given to the irrigation department, which signed a memorandum of understanding with IIT Roorkee in December 2015 to conduct a similar study on the project.

The riverfront-development project is seen as a political showdown between the state government and the ruling party, whose similar construction in Ahmedabad over the Sabarmati River has been projected as a showcase of development in the state of Gujarat. Many noted environmentalists and river-system experts vehemently opposed that project as well. Both projects are seen as a template for similar interference with river systems across India, including the Yamuna, the Hindon and the Varuna.

== Flooding ==
Monsoon flooding leads to several problems when the water recedes, including the danger posed by drying potholes and pits (which host disease causing mosquitoes such as malaria and dengue).

== See also ==
- List of rivers of India
