= Drona Parva =

Seventh book of the Mahabharata

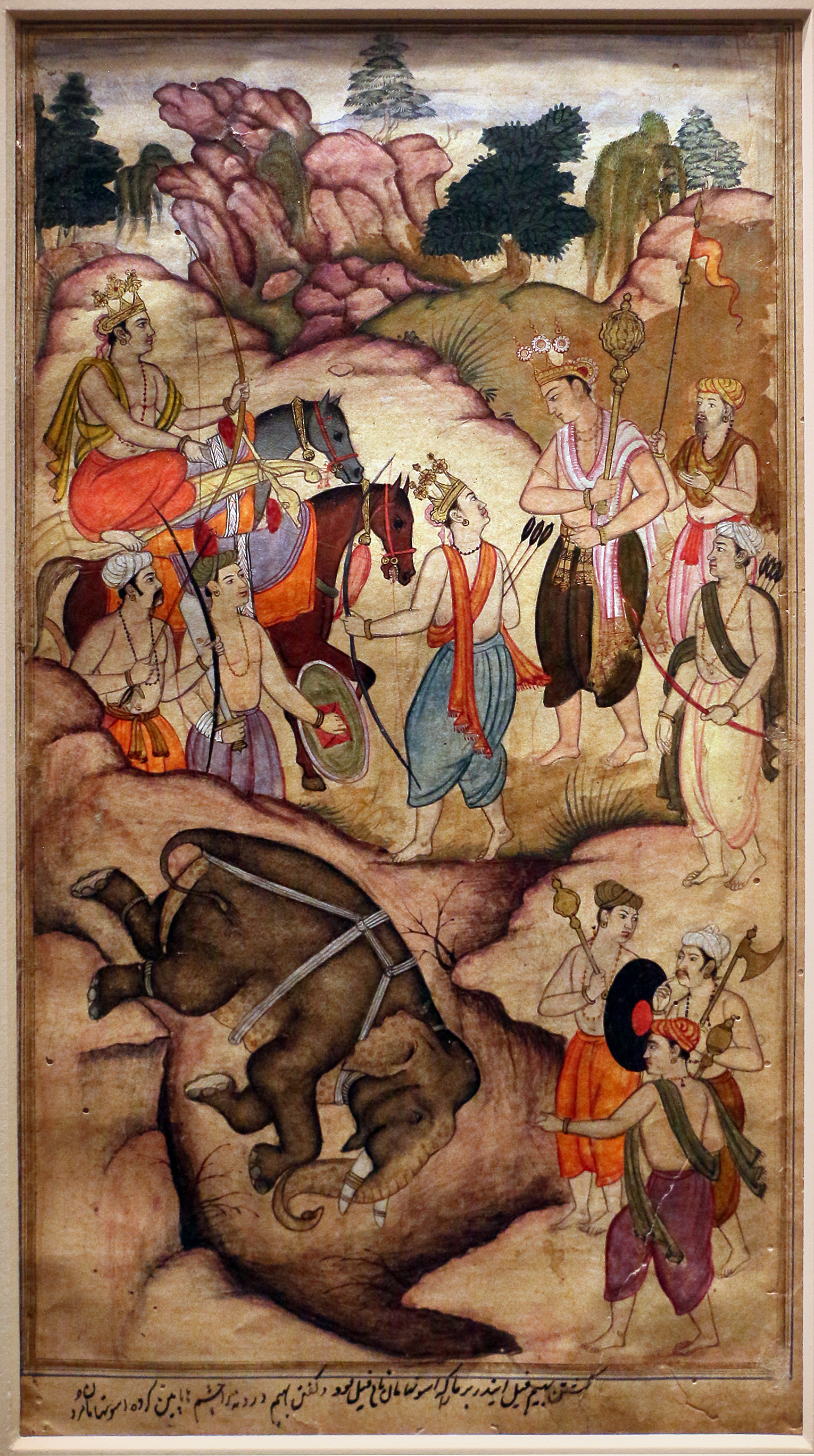
Illustration from Razmnama depicting a scene of the Drona Parva: Bhima slaying the elephant Ashvathamma

The Drona Parva (Sanskrit: द्रोण पर्व) ("Book of Drona") is the seventh of the eighteen parvas (books) of the Indian epic Mahabharata. Drona Parva traditionally has 8 parts and 204 chapters. The critical edition of Drona Parva has 8 parts and 173 chapters.

Drona Parva describes the appointment of Drona as the commander-in-chief of the Kaurava alliance on the 11th day of the Kurukshetra War, the next four days of battles, and his death on the 15th day of the 18-day war. The parva recites how the war became more brutal with each passing day; how agreed rules of a just war began to be ignored by both sides as loved ones on each side were slain; how the war extended into the night; and how millions of soldiers and major characters of the story—Abhimanyu, Jayadratha, Drona, Ghatotkacha—died during the war.

== Structure and chapters ==
The Drona Parva traditionally has 8 upa-parvas (parts, little books) and 204 adhyayas (chapters).

=== Dronābhisheka Parva (chapters: 1–16) ===
With Bhishma fatally injured and on his death bed of arrows, Kauravas remembered the mighty warrior Karna. Karna meets Bhishma with tearful eyes and seeks the blessings to participate in the War. Bhishma blessed him. Karna meets Kauravas and consoles them on the loss of Bhishma. As per Karna's advice, Duryodhana appoints Drona, their teacher, as replacement commander-in-chief for the war. Thus, Drona is crowned as the new chief of the Kauravas army.

==== 11th day of war ====
Drona arranges his army in the form of a sakata (vehicle), while their illustrious foes take on the form of krauncha (cranes). Duryodhana asks Drona to seize Yudhishthira alive. Drona promises him, with certain limitations, to divert Arjuna from the battlefield, as he cannot defeat Arjuna himself. King Yudhishthira learns of this through his spies and addresses Arjuna. Arjuna assures him not to worry, declaring that even if the wielder of the thunderbolt or Vishnu, along with the gods, assists them, they will not succeed against him, as he is undefeated. Drona begins slaughtering the Panchalas, invoking many celestial weapons in a very short time, causing all to tremble. Dhrishtadyumna battles Drona but is defeated, and his army flees. Arjuna engages in a long duel with Drona. Drona cannot defeat Arjuna, and Arjuna has no motive to kill his own guru. Shakuni, accompanied by 100 followers, rushes toward Sahadeva. Sahadeva cuts Shakuni's bow and destroys his chariot. Shakuni hurls a mace, killing his charioteer. Both then descend and fight with maces. Bhima battles Vivinsati, and Shalya fights Nakula. After vanquishing Shalya, Nakula blows his conch. Karna defeats Satyaki, and Drupada battles Bhagadatta. King Virata of the Matsya engages in battle with the mighty Kritavarma and the Narayani Sena. Bhurisrava and Sikhandin encounter each other, with Sikhandin causing Bhurisrava to tremble with his shafts. Ghatotkacha battles Alamvusha. Abhimanyu knocks down Purava, dragging him helplessly. Jayadratha comes to help, armed with a shield and sword, and battles Abhimanyu. Abhimanyu knocks Jayadratha down and then confronts Salya's division. Salya hurls an iron dart, and Abhimanyu seizes it, hurling it back and slaying his driver. All applaud Abhimanyu as his foes surround him. Then Abhimanyu, along with 22 Maharathis, attacks Drona, but Drona defeats them all. Dhrishtadyumna engages in battle with Ashwatthama but is also defeated. Bhima joins Abhimanyu and destroys the Kaurava forces, causing their army to flee. Drona rallies his troops and charges at Yudhishthira. Drona cuts off Yudhishthira's bow and slays Kumara. Then, Bhardwaja's son pierces all in his vicinity and fells Yugandhara. Virata, Drupada, Satyaki, Dhrishtadyumna, and many others pierce Drona. Drona roars aloud and beheads Singhasena and Vyaghradatta. All cry out for protection. Arjuna arrives, routing the Kauravas with a shower of arrows. A river of blood, created by the carnage, flows with bones and bodies. At sunset, a withdrawal of troops occurs on both sides. All praised Partha, commending him for vanquishing his foes.

=== Samsaptakabadha Parva (chapters: 17–32) ===
12th day of war

Duryodhana sends the Narayani Sena (army). The Narayani Sena was powerful, with each soldier being equivalent to 10,000 soldiers. During the preparations for battle, Duryodhana chose this army, leaving Krishna to assist Arjuna. Arjuna cleverly shot the weapon called Tvashtra, creating thousands of illusions, which confused the enemy troops. They began to strike at each other, each mistaking the other for Arjuna. After the chaos, Arjuna withdrew his special weapon, Tvashtra. Recovering, they showered diverse kinds of arrows, overwhelming both sides. Arjuna used the Vayavya weapon, scattering crowds of foes along with their steeds, elephants, and weapons, as if they were mere dry leaves. Drona proceeded toward Yudhishthira, arraying his forces in the form of a garuda, while Yudhishthira countered by positioning his troops in the shape of a semi-circle. Dhrishtadyumna rushed at Drona, but Durmukha intervened, checking Dhrishtadyumna, and Drona slaughtered Yudhishthira’s host. Then, Satyajit, invoking a mighty weapon, pierced Drona, injuring him and damaging his chariot and driver. Drona retaliated by cutting Satyajit’s bow and slaying Vrika by destroying his chariot, which had supported Satyajit. Drona repeatedly cut off Satyajit’s bow before killing him. Upon Satyajit's slaughter, Yudhishthira, fearing Drona, fled away. Satanika, leading his army, came to confront Drona, but Drona swiftly cut off Satanika’s head with a sharp arrow, causing all the warriors to flee. Drona then vanquished the armies, instilling fear and making a river of blood flow. Many Pandava warriors, led by Kunti's son, surrounded Drona on all sides, piercing him from every direction. Drona felled Dridhasena, King Kshema, Vasudana, Kshatradeva, and pierced many others. Drona approached Yudhishthira, but that best of kings quickly fled from his preceptor. Drona then felled Panchalya, destroying his chariot. All cried out, "Slay Drona! Slay Drona!" Drona mangled and vanquished all, including Satyaki. Seeing the Kauravas routing the Pandavas, Duryodhana rejoiced and spoke with Karna, who advised support for Drona. The Pandavas returned with celestial bows. The two old men, Drupada and Drona, encountered each other. The son of Duhsasana resisted the son of Arjuna, Draupadi’s son, Srutakirti. Vikarna resisted Sikhandin, and Karna faced the five Kekaya brothers. Bhurisrava resisted King Manimant, while Ghatotkacha confronted Alamvusha. Duryodhana, with his elephant division, charged against Bhimasena. He broke that elephant division, routing them and turning them back. Duryodhana battled Bhima, and they mangled each other. Bhima cut Duryodhana's bow. The ruler of Anga came on an elephant but was killed by Bhima, causing his division to flee and crush the foot-soldiers in their retreat. King Bhagadatta rushed at Arjuna, overwhelming him with a shower of arrows. Janardana protected Arjuna’s chariot from the elephant charge, which crushed many soldiers. Bhagadatta then pierced Krishna, and Partha cut his bow, slaying the warriors protecting his flank. Indra's son cut open the elephant's armor, damaged its standard, and pierced Bhagadatta. In response, Bhagadatta hurled some lances that displaced Arjuna's diadem. Arjuna taunted him, cut his bow, and afflicted his vital limbs. Filled with rage, Bhagadatta turned his hook into a Vaishnava weapon with mantras and hurled it at Arjuna. Kesava protected Arjuna, receiving the weapon on his chest, which turned into a garland. Arjuna asked Krishna why he had intervened, and Krishna explained the boon he had given to Bhagadatta: as long as the Vaishnava weapon was kept by its user, they would not be slain, but now Bhagadatta was exposed. Arjuna suddenly overwhelmed Bhagadatta, slaying his elephant and then the king himself. Arjuna showed respect to King Bhagadatta, then faced Shakuni's army and used explosive weapons to fell them. Shakuni employed illusions to confuse them and shower weapons upon Arjuna. Arjuna countered with celestial weapons, shooting clouds of arrows and slaying Shakuni's followers. Then, a thick darkness enveloped them, and from within that gloom, harsh voices rebuked Arjuna. However, by means of the weapon called Jyotishka, he dispelled the darkness. When the darkness was lifted, frightful waves of water appeared. Arjuna used the weapon called Aditya, drying up the water. Destroying the various illusions repeatedly created by Suvala, Arjuna laughed at him. Once all of his illusions were destroyed, unmanned by fear, Shakuni fled. Arjuna then slaughtered the Kaurava host, causing them to flee. With a single arrow, he afflicted multiple enemies. Drona's son, Ashwatthama, fought a terrible battle with King Nila and beheaded him. The Pandava host trembled at Nila's death. Abhimanyu began slaughtering the Kauravas, and Karna rushed against him. Drona started a duel with Yudhishthira, while Abhimanyu engaged Drona in battle. Arjuna fought Karna, but Karna gravely injured him. However, Bhima, Satyaki, and Dhrishtadyumna came to Arjuna's rescue, and all four warriors attacked Karna, but he forced them to flee. With all his might, Abhimanyu resisted Bhagadatta but was ultimately defeated. Then, 17 Maharathis attacked Bhagadatta, but he defeated them all. Finally, Bhagadatta faced Arjuna in a tough fight but was killed.

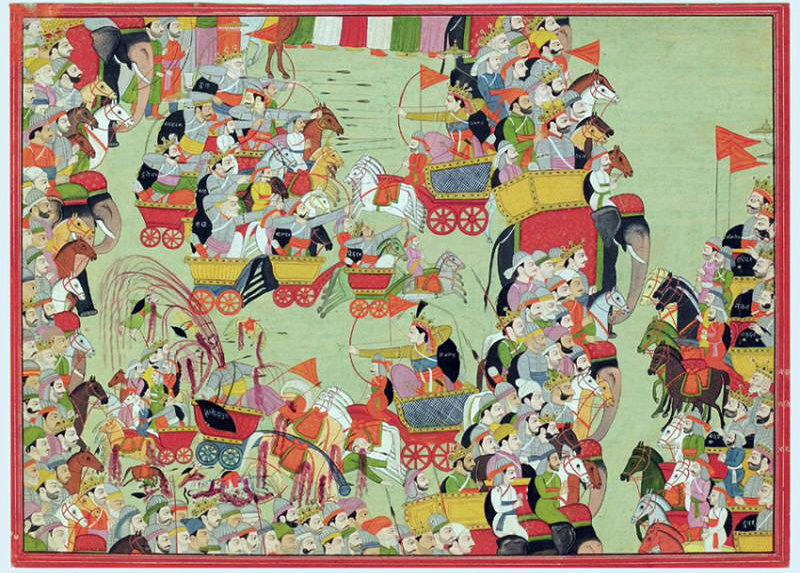
The Pandavas' nephew Abhimanyu battles the Kauravas and their allies.

=== Abhimanyu-vadha Parva (chapters: 33–71) ===
The Kaurava commander-in-chief Dronacharya planned to divert Arjuna and Krishna away to chase an army of the samsaptakhas whom Arjuna defeated that very day. The Kaurava army was grouped into the giant discus formation, which caused great loss for the Pandavas. If the formation continued till end of that day, the pandavas would have no army by sunset. The only two people on the Pandava army who completely knew about how to enter and break this formation were Arjuna and Krishna, who were away. Abhimanyu's story came to prominence when he entered the powerful Chakravyuha battle formation of the Kaurava army. Abhimanyu claimed that he could decimate the entire Kaurava army.

Abhimanyu was trained in all types of warfare by Krishna and Balrama themselves, and later by Pradyumna (Sri Krishna's son). Abhimanyu learnt the art of breaking into the Chakravyuha when he was in Subhadra's womb. It was then Arjuna was narrating the art of breaking into Chakravyuha to Subhadra. But he did not know how to destroy the formation once he was inside, as Subhadra fell asleep while listening to the story and (Abhimanyu in her womb) could learn only half of the technique. This is the reason why he was only able to enter and break but not come out of the Chakravyuha.

As soon as Abhimanyu entered the formation, Jayadratha, the ruler of Sindh blocked the other Pandavas, so that Abhimanyu was left alone. Inside the Chakravyuha, the trapped Abhimanyu went on a killing rampage, intending on carrying out the original strategy by himself and killing tens of thousands of Kaurava soldiers. Abhimanyu killed many prominent heroes including Duryodhana's son Lakshmana, Shalya's sons Rukmanagaa and Rukmanaratha, younger brothers of Karna, and many advisers of Karna, Rukmaratha, Kritavarma's son Matrikavata, Shrutanjaya, Ashavketu (from Magadha), Chandraketu, Mahavega, Suvarcha, Suryabhasa, Kalakeya (Shakuni's brother), Vasatiya, and rathas from the Brahma-Vasatiyas and Kekayas, King of Kosala - King Brihadbala, King of Amvashtas and his son and many others. Due to the Boon of Lord Chandra, Abhimanyu defeated the mighty warriors of Kauravas side including Duryodhana, Ashwatthama, Dushasana, Kritvarma, Shalya, Drona, Kripa and Karna. No Kaurava warrior could escape his arrows. Drona ordered Karna to break the divine bow of Abhimanyu. In a cowardly act, Karna then attacked Abhimanyu from behind and broke his bow and his impenetrable armour. Then Kripa killed the Abhimanyu's charioteers and Kritavarma killed the horses of Abhimanyu's chariot. Then Abhimanyu took the sword and shield which destroyed by Drona and Ashwatthama. Abhimanyu hurled the chariot wheel towards Drona, Ashwatthama and Kripa destroyed the wheel. Abhimanyu broke Ashwatthama's chariot with the mace and attacked Dushasan's son. Dushasan's son kills Abhimanyu in a mace fight.

Sage Vyasa come with new stories to tell Yudhishthira. He tells him to not suffer and become stupefied by calamities, brave heroes ascend to heaven at death, death takes all, this law is incapable of being transgressed.

=== Pratijna Parva (chapters: 72–84) ===
Arjuna, having slain large numbers of Samsaptakas with his celestial weapons, returned and learned about his son's death, which filled him with grief. Vasudeva consoled him, saying, "Yield not to grief; death is certain for heroes who do not retreat." Arjuna rebuked his brothers for not being able to save Abhimanyu. Yudhishthira explained that they had followed Abhimanyu, but the King of Sindhus, Jayadratha, had checked them all. Arjuna swore to slay Jayadratha the next day, declaring that if he failed to do so before sunset, he would enter blazing fire as an act of suicide. The Pandava army raised a loud uproar for Arjuna, and spies informed Jayadratha, who went to Duryodhana, expressing his desire to return home, fearing for his life. Duryodhana assured him that they would surround him on all sides with their forces to protect him. That very night, Jayadratha, accompanied by Duryodhana, went to Drona, who informed them that he would form a sakata (a kind of vehicle) array for offense and a half-lotus with needle-mouthed formation for Jayadratha's defense. Vasudeva addressed Dhananjaya, stating that swearing alone, with the consent of his brothers and without consulting him, was an act of rashness and that he had taken upon himself a great burden. Arjuna boasted of his celestial prowess with his celestial bow, disregarding Krishna's words. Following Arjuna's lead, Vasudeva went to comfort Subhadra. Subhadra lamented and doubted the Pandavas' strength, as they had been unable to protect her son. Arjuna then received a victory boon from Shiva for the 14th day.

=== Jayadratha-vadha Parva (chapters: 85–152) ===
14th day of war

Drona appointed 21,000 foot soldiers to protect Jayadratha. Duhsasana surrounded Arjuna with an elephant force. Arjuna killed the elephants and their riders, taking down 2-3 warriors with a single shot. Duhsasana's forces, slaughtered, fled with their leader. Savyasachi (another name for Arjuna) eventually defeated Drona after a fierce fight. Kritavarman, accompanied by 10,000 followers, came to oppose Dhananjaya. However, Arjuna blasted through that army, causing the combatants to flee upon seeing Drona pursue them. Krishna, noticing the waste of time, urged Partha to show no mercy. King Srutayudha charged at Arjuna, wielding a divine mace from Varuna. The boon he received ensured that as long as he held it, he would be immortal, but he was warned never to hurl it at an unarmed opponent, or it would return to strike him. He hurled it at Janardana (Krishna), striking his shoulder; the mace then returned, causing Srutayudha’s death. The troops fled in terror. Sudakshina then rushed at Phalguna (another name for Arjuna) in anger, hurling a dart that pierced Arjuna and momentarily swooned him. However, after recovering, Arjuna felled Sudakshina. Surrounding troops fled again in fear, but when they rallied, Arjuna struck down their heads. Srutayus and Achyutayus engaged Arjuna, but he defeated them both. Arjuna invoked the Sakra weapon, which unleashed thousands of shafts that deprived his foes of their arms and heads, killing 50 warriors. He then engaged in a fierce battle with Karna, who managed to defeat Arjuna momentarily. However, Bhima and Satyaki came to Arjuna's rescue. Arjuna killed Karna's charioteer and blasted his chariot, subsequently slaying Niyatayus and Dirghayus. Urged by Duryodhana, the elephant division of Angas surrounded Arjuna. Nevertheless, Partha, with shafts from Gandiva, cut off their heads and arms, killing a thousand warriors. Srutayus resisted Arjuna and struck both of them with a mace on their feet. Arjuna retaliated by cutting off Srutayus's arm and then his head. The Kuru ranks fled upon witnessing this. Seeing the carnage, mighty warriors Ashwatthama, Shalya, and Kripa attacked Arjuna. An avenging Arjuna defeated Kripa and Ashwatthama. He cut off Shalya's bow, flag, and pierced him with 10 shafts, causing Shalya to flee. Then, Arjuna blasted Ashwatthama's chariot and pierced him with 17 shafts, also hitting Kripa. Duryodhana went to Drona and blamed him for the ineffective formation. Drona replied that he was old and unable to move as quickly as Arjuna, emphasizing that he was tasked with protecting the gate of formation. Drona then told Duryodhana to fight himself. Duryodhana questioned how he could resist Dhananjaya. Drona provided him with armor, stating it was impenetrable to human weapons. Duryodhana then set out to confront Partha. The Pandavas, along with Dhrishtadyumna, penetrated the Kaurava army. Drona agitated the Pandava host, but Dhrishtadyumna and his troops pushed Drona back. Drona, filled with wrath, began killing multiple enemies with a single arrow, and no warriors fled in fear this time. Dhrishtadyumna attempted a stunt in battle with shield and sword, but Drona cut through everything. Just as Drona was about to slay him, Satyaki intervened and saved him. Dhrishtadyumna withdrew from the battle. Drona, who battled mildly against Satyaki, became covered in blood as the divisions became spectators of their single combat. Satyaki cut Drona's bow 16 times, and the son of Bhardwaja mentally applauded Satyaki's prowess. Drona aimed weapons at Satyaki, but Satyaki countered them with his own weapon. Then Drona invoked the Agneya weapon, and Satyaki invoked the Varuna weapon to counter it. As the sun began to set, the sons of Madri came to protect Satyaki, while Duhsasana led thousands of princes to defend Drona. Bhima defeated Drona and Kripa before searching for Arjuna. Meanwhile, Karna attacked Bhima, cutting his bow and breaking his weapons—spades, swords, maces, etc. However, Karna spared Bhima's life. Arjuna then slew Vinda and his younger brother Anuvinda, striking Vasudeva (Krishna) on the forehead with his mace. Arjuna cut off all of Anuvinda's limbs and then killed his followers. As Arjuna's horses became tired, he dismounted to allow Krishna to take care of the horses. Many thousands of enemies rushed at him while he was grounded but he fought them all off. During this, Krishna reminded Arjuna that there was no lake to water the horses, so Arjuna created a lake through his paranjaya astra to water the horses and a shed made of arrows to shelter Krishna, all while holding off many foes on foot. This filled all the watchers with awe upon seeing the fearless Arjuna and Krishna. After remounting, Arjuna drove the soldiers away from battle as if they were atheists turning away from the Vedas. Seeing Duryodhana, Vasudeva praised him and reminded him of his evil conspiracy to slay Arjuna. Duryodhana proceeded without fear, and everyone applauded him, proclaiming, "The king is slain." Duryodhana then challenged Arjuna to demonstrate his manliness by using all his weapons against him, cutting Vasudeva's whip with a broad-headed arrow. All of Arjuna's shots were repelled by Duryodhana's armor. Savyasachin (another name for Arjuna) then made Duryodhana carless and cut the leathern fence around his fingers, piercing the Kuru king in his palms. Warriors rushed to rescue Duryodhana and were slaughtered. Satyaki engaged in a duel with Kritavarma, while Bhima attacked the Kauravas. As per Duryodhana’s order, Karna came to aid the Kauravas, defeating Bhima in archery. Karna broke Bhima’s bow, and knowing it was impossible to defeat Karna in archery, Bhima picked up a sword and jumped out of his chariot. The sword duel between Bhima and Karna began, with Karna heavily injuring Bhima. Although Bhima ran away, Karna caught him, dragging him across the battlefield with the horn of his bow, but ultimately spared him. Duryodhana, with eight charioteers, surrounded Arjuna. Arjuna cut Salya's bow twice, and Bhurisrava, filled with rage, struck Arjuna after cutting off the goad. Alamvusha resisted Bhimasena, and Karna and King Bahlika joined to aid Alamvusha. Bhima broke Karna’s chariot and defeated Bahlika and Alamvusha. Bhima then went to meet Arjuna. Karna came to battle Bhima again, cutting Bhima's bow seven times and destroying his chariot five times, ultimately making Bhima unconscious. In another battle, Bhima killed 20 more Kaurava brothers who came to aid Karna, including Vikarna, right in front of Karna and Duryodhana. A river of blood flowed, enhancing the joy of the heroes. Satyaki checked all and slew the steeds of Duhsasana. He then battled the Trigarta divisions, forcing them to flee. Bhurishrava came forward and challenged Satyaki to battle, gravely wounding the mighty Yadava warrior. Satyaki's ten sons, who came to save him, were killed by Bhurishrava, thus, fulfilling his birth prophecy. Angered by this, Satyaki attacked Bhurishrava again. Though Bhurishrava struck Satyaki and spared him, he dragged him by the hair and struck him in the chest with his feet. Vasudeva addressed Arjuna, who mentally applauded the Kuru warrior. As Bhurishrava's was about to slaughter an unarmed Satyaki, Krishna directed Arjuna to stop him. Heeding his words, Arjuna cut off Bhurishrava's right arm from behind. When Bhurishrava rebuked Arjuna for his act, Arjuna reminded him that Dharma required him to protect his allies and not sit as a silent spectator as his ally was slaughtered. Bhurishrava then arranged a bunch of arrows with his left hand on the ground, sat upon the bed of arrows, and meditated, seeking to send his soul to Brahmaloka. Satyaki rose and drew his sword. Although all the warriors condemned him for his intention, Satyaki severed Bhurishrava's head. All the gods applauded Bhurishrava. When everyone present, including the Pandava warriors, criticized Satyaki for killing such a great person, Satyaki reminded them that Bhurishrava had dragged him across the ground and Satyaki had previously taken an oath to kill any who does that. Karna consoled Duryodhana, who was distressed upon learning about his uncle's unfair slaughter by Satyaki. As Arjuna continued his slaughtering spree, the sun turned red. Ashwatthaman failed to resist Arjuna, who fought valiantly to protect Jayadratha. Celestial weapons were utilized in that battle. Dhananjaya cut off Karna's bowstring and shot a shaft towards him, but Aswatthama intercepted the arrow, cutting it off. Arjuna then destroys Karna cart. Aswatthama made Karna to ride on his chariot. Arjuna then invoked the Varuna weapon, manifesting it all around him. Following that, he called forth the Aindra weapon, which unleashed thousands of shafts, killing countless warriors. A river of blood flowed across the earth. Arjuna advanced toward Jayadratha, engaging him in battle and cutting off the head of his charioteer. Meanwhile, the sun was about to set. Krishna addressed Arjuna and used his powers to create darkness. As a result, all the warriors sheathed their weapons, believing the sun had set. Seizing this opportunity, Arjuna began to slaughter the enemy forces.

The protectors of Jayadratha became puzzled and fled. Arjuna defeated Karna, his son, and felled Salya's driver. Krishna instructed Arjuna on how to kill Jayadratha. Using a celestial arrow, Arjuna cut off Jayadratha's head and, by shooting shafts repeatedly, sent it to Jayadratha's father's lap. As the latter stood after finishing his prayers, the head suddenly fell to the earth. When Jayadratha's head struck the ground, the head of Vriddhakshatra cracked into a hundred pieces, as per his own curse. All applauded both of them, and Vasudeva withdrew the darkness. While searching for Jayadratha on the battlefield, Arjuna, with the help of Lord Shiva, slew seven akshauhinis (a battle formation that consisted of 153,090 chariots, 153,090 elephants, 459,270 cavalry, and 765,450 infantry) of Kaurava soldiers. The Pandavas reveled in their victory. Kripa and Aswatthaman, filled with wrath, afflicted Arjuna. Dhananjaya made Kripa swoon, and the driver of Kripa's chariot bore him away from the battle. Aswatthaman, in fear, fled. Karna attacked Satyaki and rendered him carless. As the sun set, Krishna approached Yudhishthira, the son of Dharma, and informed him of Jayadratha's slaughter. Duryodhana spoke with Drona, blaming him for being lenient with Arjuna since he was his disciple. Drona replied that he would penetrate into the enemy host for Duryodhana. Duryodhana then discussed the matter with Karna. Karna defended Drona, stating that it was not Drona's fault; Arjuna was accomplished in weaponry, and the preceptor was old and incapable of moving quickly. Infuriated by Jayadratha's death and Duryodhana's insult, Drona decided to continue the battle past sunset, to which Karna disagreed, asserting that it was against the laws of war. However, Drona convinced Karna that the rules of war had already been violated when Krishna created illusions through darkness. The fight continued.

=== Ghatotkacha-vadha Parva (chapters: 153–184) ===
Fight continues past sunset, with Duryodhana, penetrating into enemy host, slaughtering and making them run away. Yudhishthira cuts his bow, then pierces him with a fierce shaft such that, he sat on his car. Drona quickly showed himself there in that battle, and all mighty car warriors proceeded against Drona in battle. The night became pitch dark, enhancing the terrors of the timid. All these, however, that advanced against the illustrious Drona, were either obliged to turn back or despatched to the abode of Yama. Drona alone pierced with his shafts, millions of foot-soldiers and steeds. Drona despatched all Kaikeyas and the sons of Dhrishtadyumna into the world of spirits. Then he beheaded king Sivi. Vrikodara, leaping from his car to ruler of Kalinga, slew him with his fist. His bone broke and fell on earth. Then he crushed, by blow of his fist, Dhruva and Jayarata. Next, Bhima crushed with fist 2 Kaurava brothers. All kings fled away in his vicinity. Somdatta challenges Satyaki, for his cruel action of slaying his unarmed son (Bhurishrava) by breaking war rules. Satyaki says he did good and will do the same to him. Duryodhana sends 11,000 warriors for Somdatta and Dhrishtadyumna accompanied by force comes to aid Satyaki. Satyaki pierces Somadatta and swooned him away 2 times. His driver, bore him away from the battle. Drona comes and Yudhishthira from other side comes for battle. Drona pierces all, slaughtering host, made them fled in fear in the very sight of Arjuna. Aswatthama battle Ghatotkacha and vanquishes him two times but fled away when Ghatotkacha invoked his illusions. Valhika hurling a dart swooned away Bhima and Bhima hurling a mace snatched away the head of Valhika. 10 Kaurava brothers comes and dies at hand of Bhima. Drona's son goes to battle, and slewing many warriors, made them fled. Dhrishtadyumna surrounds him with 100 of warriors and challenges him. Drona's son cut his bow and car, then he trembled Pandava host. Slewing a hundred Panchalas, made others fled. Yudhishthira and Bhimasena battles Drona's son. King Duryodhana aided by Bhardwaja's son comes in that encounter. Drona destroys his foes, by means of the Vayavya weapon. Panchalas fled away, from fear. Karna created massive destruction among the Pandava Army that no warrior had the guts to face Karna at that time. Arjuna comes rallying troops and slaughters Kauravas, making them fly away. Somadatta again battle Satyaki. Somadatta cuts his bow and Satyaki too cuts his bow, damaging car in addition. Bhima comes to aid Satyaki. Satyaki make him bowless and carless, then kills him. Yudhishthira routs enemy troops and Drona rush against him for battle. Vasudeva comes and tell Yudhishthira that he is not fit to fight with Drona, but go fight instead by Bhima's side. Yudhishthira, reflecting for a moment, proceeds. Lamps and torches were lit to illuminate area visibility. The gods came there seeing that light to watch. Kritavarman resisted Yudhishthira. Kritavarman cuts his bow and Yudhishthira his bow and leathern fence in hands. Kritavarman made him carless, then cuts his sword, shield and armor. Yudhishthira quickly retreated from battle. Satyaki felled Bhuri. Bhima battle King Duryodhana. Duryodhana cuts Bhima bow 5 times and damages his car. Bhima in wrath hurled a heavy mace, crushing his car and regarded Suyodhana to had been slain in darkness, enjoyed. When Ghatotkach started using illusionary powers against Kauravas. Then all the warriors of Kauravas retreated except Dronacharya, Ashwatthama and Karna. Dronacharya was battling on the other front that time. Then Ashwatthama alone faced Ghatotkach and countered 100s of illusions of the latter. He was one out of the two warriors who has seized a celestial weapon by his bare arms. Then he hurled it back against the latter which forced the latter to jump from his chariot and his chariot with steeds and charioteer were burnt into ashes within moments. He fought valiantly against Ghatotkach During the progress of battle he killed Anjanaparvan (son of Ghatotkachh). He killed many Panchal warriors, sons of Drupada, 10 sons of Kuntibhoja (cousins of Pandavas), etc. He killed 1 Akshauhini of Rakshasas by ordinary bow and ordinary chariot within Moments (twinkling of eye) in the very sight of Bheema, Arjuna, Krishna.

Ghatotkach was frequently getting assistance from Bheema Dhristadyumna Yudhishthir and many Pandavas troops but Ashwatthama kept his senses under control and battled against all of them single-handedly for very long time. Then, Dhristadyumna took the latter away from Ashwatthama’s presence. And Pandavas troops headed by Yudhishthira including Bheema also retreated from Ashwatthama’s presence.

Ashwatthama took weapons of full 8 carts in that long Duel. Also Rakshasas power were obviously high due to Night factor in that battle. Then after sometime Ghatotkach once more battled Ashwatthama. This time he fainted Ashwatthama and Ashwatthama fled away. Karna, the son of Vikartana, resisted Sahadeva in that battle. Karna cuts his bow and dispatched his driver, to Yama's abode. Then he cuts all weapons of Sahadeva. Sahadeva left the battle, while pursued by the son of Radha. Then touching him with bow, Karna said, 'Do not, O hero, fight in battle with those that are superior to thee. Fight with thy equals, O son of Madri or return home if thou likest.' Having said these words, that foremost of car-warriors, smilingly proceeded on his car against the troops of the king of Panchalas. The slayer of foes, that mighty car warrior, devoted to truth, slew not the son of Madri although he had got the opportunity, recollecting the words of Kunti. Sahadeva, then, heartless and afflicted with arrows, proceeds to another side. Salya made Virata swooned away. Duryodhana talks and criticizes Karna and Drona. Then Drona, Sakuni, Karna and Vrishasena goes against Satyaki, Drupada and Dhrishtadyumna divisions. They slaughter their troops and routs them. Janardana talks with Phalguna. Karna battles Dhrishtadyumna. Karna cuts his bow and make him carless. Karna again starts destroying Pandava Army. Drona and Arjuna engaged in the fierce battle, Drona defeats Dhananjaya and Arjuna fled away. When Vrishasena massacring Panchala Army, Drupada attacks Vrishasena. The valiant son of Karna gravely injured Drupada and Drupada ran away. Karna caused much more destruction among Pandava army. When everyone refused to face Karna, soldiers request Arjuna to prevent Karna from causing much more destruction. Krishna said that no warrior can face Karna in night as Karna was highly skilled in night war also and decides to send Ghatotkacha to capable of advancing against Karna in battle and Arjuna also orders Ghatotkacha to slay Karna. Rakshasa gets inspired with greater strength at night, giving advantage to Ghatotkacha, who enters field along with Satyaki. Duryodhana sends Alamvusha for Ghatotkacha. Ghatotkacha cuts every weapon and car of him. Alamvusha, wrathfully struck him, with fists, trembling him. Ghatotkacha chops him, then press him upon ground. Alamvusha then seize, drag and throw him down. Then both uses power of illusion, solicitous of destroying each other. Ghatotkacha at last, seizes him and press him down on the earth. Taking a scimitar, cut off from his trunk, foe head. He then seize and throw that head on Duryodhana's car saying that Karna will be kill like this soon. Meanwhile Karna defeats Satyaki, and when Karna was about to cut off the Satyaki's head, Satyaki ran away and came towards Ghatotkacha to save his life. Enraged Ghatotkacha battles Radha's son. Karna uses celestial weapons and Ghatotkacha his illusive powers. Karna destroys his car. Ghatotkacha then started to destroy celestial weapon of Karna, but Karna was not at all agitated and invoked more celestial weapon. Karna destroyed Ghatotkacha's 1000 illusions and Ghatotkacha shooting an Anjalika weapon, quickly cut off the bow of Karna. Karna afflicts him and destroys his Rakshasa army of one akshauhini. Ghatotkacha then makes himself invisible, starts to fly in the sky and throws an celestial disc on Karna, but Karna destroyed that disc. Karna pierced gigantic Ghatotkacha's body with uncountable arrows that there is no space of even two fingers breadth body. The Rakshasa, excited with rage, hurled at him an Asani weapon. Karna, placing his bow on his car, jumps and seizing that Asani hurled it back, reducing Ghatotkacha car to ashes, while later jumps down. All Gods wondered about this. All creatures applauded Karna, who, having achieved that feat, once more ascended his car. Then Karna starts to destroy the illusion made by Rakshasa. Then Ghatotkacha sends many Rakshasas, Yatadhanas, Pisachas to kill Karna. However Karna kills all those. When Bhima hurls Karna to save his son, Duryodhana sends Rakshasa Alayudha, who goes to battle Bhimasena. However Bhima got defeated and beaten by Alayudha. Krishna sends others to busy Karna while sends Ghatotkacha for Bhima help. Meanwhile, Karna, in that battle agitated Dhrishtadyumna and Sikhandin army. Alayudha struck Ghatotkacha, on the head, with a gigantic Parigha, making him in a partial swoon. Recovering consciousness, Ghatotkacha hurls a mace, crushing Alayudha car, but with the help of illusion, later jumped down. Then both destroys each other illusions and gets wounded. At last Gatotkacha beheads him and enjoys. Till that time, Karna broke and retreated troops. Gatotkacha returns and approach him. When Gatotkacha couldn't prevail over Karna, he invoked into existence a fierce and mighty weapon, with which he slew steeds and driver of Karna, then made himself invisible. All gets frightened that he will certainly slay Karna by appearing next to him. Karna covers himself with celestial weapon and an illusion appears in the sky, from which shower of weapons occur slaughtering Kaurava host. Karna didn't fled from battle and his steeds were slain by Rakshasa. At last, he was forced to used Vasavi dart by his army and slew Gatotkacha. Before dying fall, Ghatotkacha increases his size and crushed full 1 unit of Kaurava ranks, benefitting Pandavas. All Pandavas griefs except Vasudeva who when asked by Arjuna tells him that Karna shakti weapon being baffled through Ghatotkacha, is already slain. There is no human being in the world who can stand in front of Karna if he possesses shakti weapon and if he also had armor and earrings, then he could also conquer the three worlds including the gods. At that stage, even Indra, Kubera, Varuna, or Yama could not face the war with him. We too were unable to win over him. For his benefit, Indra tricked him for armor and earrings. Even though all these things are not with him today, he cannot be killed by anyone other than him. Devoted to Brahmanas, truthful in speech, engaged in penances, observant of vows, kind even unto foes, for these reasons Karna is called Vrisha (Dharma). Even if the entire god and demons attack from four sides, they cannot win him. Being deprived of the power of Armor, earrings, and Indra Vasavi he has become a simple human being today. Yudhishthira becomes cheerless at Karna and griefs for Ghatotkacha death. Krishna comforts him. Yudhishthira with Sikhandin proceed against Karna. Vasudeva tells Dhananjaya to help him. Vyasa appears and tells Yudhishthira to cease anger, as on the fifth day after this, he will be the king and disappears. Then at Yudhishthira's command, all rush to slay Drona, the enemy commander. The King Duryodhana, desiring to protect Drona's life, comes with his army. Till that time, it became midnight and warriors started to feel sleepy. All retreat.

=== Drona-vadha Parva (chapters: 185–193) ===
15th day of war

This passage recounts how Drona, the revered teacher of both the Kauravas and the Pandavas, met his end on the 15th day of the great battle. Before the battle, Duryodhana confronts Drona, accusing him of being too lenient on the Pandavas and wasting his many celestial weapons. Drona, however, refuses to commit any ignoble act in the name of victory and praises Arjuna's skill. He advises Duryodhana to face Arjuna and his followers, who are the root cause of the war. Drona forms two divisions of the army and challenges the kings on the battlefield. Drupada and Virata confront him, but Drona kills three of Drupada’s grandsons and vanquishes the Chedis, Kaikeyas, Srinjayas, and Matsyas. He then cuts the bows of both Drupada and Virata, sending them to the abode of Yama (the god of death). Witnessing his father’s death, Dhrishtadyumna is consumed by rage and vows to kill Drona. Supported by his division, Dhrishtadyumna advances against Drona. From one side, Arjuna moves forward, while Duryodhana, Karna, Sakuni, and the Kaurava brothers rush to protect Drona from the other side. Bhima encourages Dhrishtadyumna, and then penetrates Drona's formation. During the fierce battle, a dust cloud envelops the field, obscuring the vision of the warriors. Duryodhana and Duhsasana engage the Pandava twins, Nakula and Sahadeva. Duryodhana pushes Nakula back, while Sahadeva kills Duhsasana’s charioteer, causing Duhsasana’s horses to panic. Karna faces Bhima, and they engage in a close-combat encounter with maces. Drona battles Arjuna, but despite his best efforts, he cannot gain the upper hand. In his heart, Drona silently applauds Arjuna’s prowess. Even celestial beings come to witness their duel, with invisible voices praising both warriors. Drona invokes the Brahma weapon, but Arjuna counters it with a similar weapon of his own. Duhsasana and Dhrishtadyumna also engage in battle, with Dhrishtadyumna forcing Duhsasana to retreat. As Dhrishtadyumna pushes forward against Drona, Kritavarman and his brothers try to stop him, while Nakula and Sahadeva come to his aid. Duryodhana charges at Dhrishtadyumna, but Satyaki intercepts him. In a moment of hesitation, Duryodhana recalls their childhood friendship, but the battle continues. Duryodhana cuts Satyaki’s bow in two, but Satyaki retaliates, and Duryodhana takes a brief respite. Karna tries to intervene, but Bhima blocks him. Yudhishthira rallies his troops against Drona, while Bhima, Nakula, and Sahadeva devise a plan with Arjuna to kill Drona. However, Drona proves too powerful and crushes their efforts. Seeing Drona’s unstoppable fury, Krishna tells Arjuna that Drona cannot be defeated by fair means; only when he lays down his weapons can he be killed. Krishna suggests that if Drona hears of his son Ashwatthaman’s death, he might lose the will to fight. Arjuna disagrees, but others support the plan. Bhima then kills an elephant named Ashwatthaman and, with feigned sorrow, approaches Drona, declaring, "Ashwatthaman has been slain." Drona, skeptical due to his son’s strength, rushes into battle and uses the Brahma weapon to kill 20,000 Panchalas. He also decapitates Vasudana and kills 11,100 of his soldiers. As Drona continues his massacre, seven great Rishis and celestial sages appear and ask him to stop, telling him that his time on earth has come. They remind him that he has used celestial weapons against unarmed men, which is unrighteous. Distressed, Drona turns to Yudhishthira, knowing he has never spoken a lie. Krishna, foreseeing this, advises Yudhishthira that sometimes falsehood is better than truth if it saves lives, and that lying in this case would not bring sin. Bhima urges Yudhishthira to lie, knowing that Drona would believe his words. When Drona asks if his son has truly been slain, Yudhishthira replies, "Ashwatthaman is dead," muttering the word "elephant" under his breath. Grief-stricken, Drona loses his will to fight and becomes vulnerable. Dhrishtadyumna seizes the opportunity, driven by a desire for revenge for his father's and sons' deaths, and also to avenge his previous defeat by Drona. As Drona sits in meditation, Dhrishtadyumna, with a single blow of his sword, beheads him. Disregarding the pleas of the other kings to capture him, Dhrishtadyumna rejoices in his victory, holding Drona's severed head aloft. Covered in Drona’s blood, Dhrishtadyumna presents the head to the Kaurava army, causing them to flee in terror. The Pandavas, now victorious, celebrate loudly. Bhima embraces Dhrishtadyumna and declares that he will embrace him again after Karna and Duryodhana are also slain in battle.

=== Narayanastra-mokshana Parva (chapters: 194–204) ===
Kripa informed Ashwatthaman of his father’s unjust death, which enraged him. Filled with wrath, Drona’s son returned to the battlefield and told Duryodhana that he would use a weapon unknown to the Pandavas, vowing to slay Dhrishtadyumna and his Panchala army. Ashwatthaman invoked the Narayana weapon, a destructive force of immense power. Meanwhile, on the Pandava side, Arjuna discussed morality with Yudhishthira. Bhimasena confidently claimed they should not fear Ashwatthaman, as he would personally defeat him. Dhrishtadyumna defended his actions, arguing that if killing Bhagadatta and Bhishma was righteous, then his own actions were also justified. He warned Arjuna not to criticize him and offered forgiveness for his harsh words. Arjuna, in tears, was rebuked by Satyaki, who called for Dhrishtadyumna to be slain. However, Dhrishtadyumna, showing restraint, replied that the powerful forgive the weak, just as he forgave Satyaki. The conflict escalated as Dhrishtadyumna criticized Satyaki for killing the armless Bhurisravas and warned him that if he spoke harshly again, he would send him to Yama’s abode. Enraged, Satyaki grabbed a mace and charged at Dhrishtadyumna. Bhima, urged by Krishna, intervened and restrained Satyaki, while Sahadeva called for peace. Dhrishtadyumna, smiling, taunted Satyaki, saying he would fight him and, after defeating him, continue fighting for the Pandavas. With great effort, Krishna and Yudhishthira managed to pacify the situation. As the Narayana weapon began its destruction, killing thousands of soldiers, Krishna realized the scale of its power. He instructed everyone to throw down their weapons, dismount from their vehicles, and lie on the ground. Bhima resisted, reminding Arjuna of his vow never to abandon his bow, Gandiva. Despite this, Arjuna set aside his bow and dismounted, urging Bhima to do the same. Bhima, however, charged fearlessly toward Ashwatthaman, but the fiery weapon struck him. Seeing Bhima overwhelmed, Arjuna used the Varuna (water) weapon to protect him. Arjuna and Krishna ran to Bhima, unarmed, and thus, the Narayana weapon spared them. Krishna then dragged Bhima from his car, forcing him to lay aside his weapons. Since no one remained armed, the Narayana weapon pacified, sparing the Pandavas and their army. Duryodhana urged Ashwatthaman to use the weapon again, but Ashwatthaman explained that it could only be used once in a lifetime. Instead, Duryodhana encouraged him to use other weapons. Ashwatthaman, filled with grief over his father’s death, attacked Dhrishtadyumna, destroying his chariot and scattering his troops. The Panchalas fled, and Dhrishtadyumna was in grave danger. Satyaki intervened, inflicting severe wounds on Ashwatthaman and even destroying his chariot. Ashwatthaman, undeterred, returned in a new chariot and continued to fight fiercely. During their battle, Ashwatthaman pierced Satyaki with an arrow that passed through his armor and body. Covered in blood, Satyaki’s driver carried him away from the battlefield. Bhima, accompanied by five warriors, confronted Ashwatthaman, but he quickly disabled them all. Bhima retaliated, cutting off Ashwatthaman’s bow and deeply wounding him with arrows. Despite his injuries, Ashwatthaman continued fighting, cutting Bhima’s bow and incapacitating his charioteer, causing Bhima’s horses to flee. As Bhima's forces faltered, Arjuna arrived to rally the troops. Ashwatthaman, enraged by Arjuna’s harsh words, invoked the Agneya weapon, unleashing flames that ravaged the Pandava army. The flames were so intense that elephants fell, the waters boiled, and the very sun was obscured. The Kauravas rejoiced at the destruction. In response, Arjuna invoked the Brahma weapon, dispelling the flames and smoke. Though a great portion of the Pandava army perished, Arjuna and Krishna’s chariot remained unharmed, filling the Pandavas with joy. Ashwatthaman, disheartened, fled the battlefield. On his retreat, he encountered Vyasa and questioned why his weapon had failed to kill Arjuna and Krishna. Vyasa explained the concept of Nara and Narayana and advised Ashwatthaman to withdraw for the night, as the armies prepared for rest. Later, Arjuna spoke with Vyasa about a warrior he had seen fighting on his side with a lance. Vyasa revealed that the warrior was none other than Lord Shiva, who had been protecting him from Ashwatthaman, Karna, and Kripa. Vyasa urged Arjuna to offer his respects to Lord Shiva and reminded him that, with Krishna (Janardana) as his advisor and protector, defeat was impossible.

== English translations ==
Drona Parva was composed in Sanskrit. Several translations of the book in English are available. Two translations from the 19th century, now in public domain, are those by Kisari Mohan Ganguli and Manmatha Nath Dutt. The translations vary with each translator's interpretations.

Clay Sanskrit Library has published a 15 volume set of the Mahabharata which includes a translation of Drona Parva by Vaughan Pilikian. This translation is modern and uses an old manuscript of the Epic. The translation does not remove verses and chapters now widely believed to be spurious and smuggled into the Epic in 1st or 2nd millennium AD.

Debroy, in 2011, notes that updated critical edition of Drona Parva, after removing verses and chapters generally accepted so far as spurious and inserted with prejudice, has 8 parts, 173 adhyayas (chapters) and 8,069 shlokas (verses). He has published a translated version of the critical edition of Drona Parva in Volume 6 of his series.

The entire parva has been "transcreated" and translated in verse by the poet Dr. Purushottama Lal published by Writers Workshop.

== Quotations and teachings ==
Dronābhisheka Parva, Chapter 4:

May you be the refuge of your friends, as the ocean is the refuge of the rivers, the sun of the planets, the pious of the truth, fertile soil of the seeds, and Parjannya of the created beings.

— Invitation to Karna to join the Kauravas side in the war, Drona Parva, Mahabharata Book vii.4.2

Dronābhisheka Parva, Chapter 4:

In this world, the relationship between the virtuous is more important than a relationship resulting from birth.

— Bhishma to Karna, Drona Parva, Mahabharata Book vii.4.13

Dronābhisheka Parva, Chapter 5:

Another can never see so well what should be done as he seeth it whose concern it is.

— Karna, Drona Parva, Mahabharata Book vii.5.3

Jayadratha-badha Parva, Chapter 148:

Men that are heroic, virtuous and most exalted, having defeated an enemy, neither boast of themselves with harsh words, nor indulge in abusive language.

— Sanjaya, Drona Parva, Mahabharata Book vii.148.12

Ghatotkacha-badha Parva, Chapter 154:

Millions of foot-soldiers and hundreds of millions of horses were pierced with shafts by Drona alone that night.

— Sanjaya, Drona Parva, Mahabharata Book vii.154.41

== See also ==
- Previous book of Mahabharata: Bhishma Parva
- Next book of Mahabharata: Karna Parva
