= Dronacharya Temple, Gurugram =

- Location within Haryana

Religion
- Affiliation: Hinduism
- District: Gurugram
- Deity: Drona

Location
- Location: Bhim Nagar, Sector 6, Gurugram
- State: Haryana
- Country: India
- Interactive map of Dronacharya Temple, Gurugram
- Coordinates: 28.470°N 77.022°E

Architecture
- Type: Hindu Nagara
- Creator: Singha Bharat
- Established: 1872

The Dronacharya Temple is one of the only Hindu temples in India that is dedicated to Dronacharya, the teacher of the Pandavas and Kauravas in the Mahabharata. It is located in the Bhim Nagar village of Gurugram, Haryana, India.

== History and Significance ==
According to the Mahabharata, Gurugram is the location where Guru Dronacharya used to live. It is also the location where he taught the Pandavas and Kauravas. In 1872, Singha Bharat, who was an ardent devotee of Shitala Devi (the wife of Drona), constructed the current temple. Singha Bharat had donated a lot of land towards Dronacharya-related structures. Over the years, the Drona temple became larger and went from one room to two rooms. The temple is currently maintained by five families that live near the temple. Often, visitors from the more famous Sheetla Mata Temple also visit the Dronacharya Temple.

The temple is located near other important sites related to the Mahabharata in Gurugram, such as the Gurugram Bhima Kund (where Drona bathed), the Ekalavya temple, and a temple of Lord Shiva that was built by the Pandavas.

== Structure ==
The temple has two rooms and is located on the corner of a street. It is painted pink. In the middle of the temple is a tall statue of Drona. Statues of other Hindu deities surround the Drona statue. The back wall has paintings that depict Dronacharya teaching his students.

== Recent Attempts for Tourism ==
The villagers of Bhim Nagar were very happy when Gurgaon was renamed to Gurugram. They expected that more tourists would come to the Drona temple. To increase tourism, the villagers have demanded that a local tourism circuit be developed with encompasses the Dronacharya temple, the Ekalavya temple, and other nearby sites.
