= Ekalavya Temple =

- Location within Haryana

Religion
- Affiliation: Hinduism
- District: Gurugram
- Deity: Ekalavya
- Governing body: Gurugram Sanskritik Gourav Samiti

Location
- Location: Khandsa, Sector 37, Gurugram
- State: Haryana
- Country: India
- Coordinates: 28.422°N 76.99°E

Architecture
- Type: Hindu Nagara
- Established: 1721

The Ekalavya temple (Hindi: एकलव्य मंदिर) is the only Hindu temple in the world dedicated to Ekalavya of the Mahabharata. It is located in the Khandsa village of Gurugram, Haryana, India. It is built atop the spot where Ekalavya cut his thumb and offered it to Guru Drona as Guru Dakshina. His thumb was buried in this location and a temple was built on top of it to honor this great hero.

== History and Significance ==
According to the Mahabharata, the Pandavas and Kauravas used to train under Guru Dronacharya. Drona had promised Arjuna that he would make him the greatest archer of his time. However, one day, Arjuna discovered a boy named Ekalavya who was even better than him. He told Drona about Ekalavya. Remembering his promise, Drona reluctantly asked Ekalavya to cut off his right thumb (an essential body part for archery) as Gurudakshina (gift to the Guru). Ekalavya obeyed and cut off his right thumb. It is said that Ekalavya's thumb was buried in that location.

To honor Ekalavya's sacrifice, in 1721, an affluent villager built a small Ekalavya temple on that spot. It is now maintained by the Gurugram Sanskritik Gourav Samiti. Today, only the local villagers visit the temple. It is not very popular among tourists and foreigners. The temple is also highly revered by the Bhil people, who visit it in large numbers from Rajasthan, Madhya Pradesh, and other parts of India.

The temple is located near other important sites related to the Mahabharata in Gurugram, such as the Gurugram Bhima Kund (where Drona bathed), a temple dedicated to Dronacharya, and a temple of Lord Shiva that was built by the Pandavas.

== Structure ==
The temple has only one room which can fit a couple people at a time. Along with that, there is also a two-room Ekalavya Dharamshala (Hindi: एकलव्य धर्मशाला) built by the village Panchayat to accommodate any pilgrims that visit the temple.

== Recent Attempts for Tourism ==
The villagers and members of the Gurugram Sanskritik Gourav Samiti were very happy when Gurgaon was renamed to Gurugram. They expected that more tourists would come to the location. They have initiated a special puja on January 14 every year. The puja will be performed by the Nishada caste, to which Ekalavya belonged. Along with that, they want to expand the temple and the temple premises. The villagers have also demanded that a local tourism circuit be developed with encompasses the Ekalavya temple, the Dronacharya temple, and other sites.
