= Gurugram Bhim Kund =

Wetland in India

- Pinchokda Jhod
- Location within Haryana
- Location: Gurugram in Haryana state of India
- Coordinates: 28.422°N 76.99°E
- Type: pond
- Etymology: Bhima
- Part of: Mahabharata folklore
- Primary inflows: rainwater
- River sources: none
- Primary outflows: none
- Ocean/sea sources: none
- Catchment area: Gurugram
- Basin countries: India
- Managing agency: Gurgaon Municipal Corporation
- Surface area: 10 acres (4.0 ha)
- Average depth: 5 to 10 feet (1.5 to 3.0 m)
- Max. depth: 10 ft (3.0 m)
- Surface elevation: 217 m (712 ft)
- Website: https://www.seotug.in/

Gurugram Bhim Kund, also known as Pinchokhda Jhod, is a 10-acre wetland in Bhim Nagar locality of Gurgaon city of Gurugram district in the state of Haryana in India. It lies between sector 4, 6 and 8 about 3 km from Rajiv Chowk.

== Folklore ==
Gurugram and this pond is the location where Arjuna saw nothing but the bird's eye before his arrow pierced it. The traditional name of India is Bharata which comes from the Mahabharata tribe of same name from this area. This 10-acre Gurugram Bhim Kund (Bhima's pond) was developed by guru Drona in the Bhim Nagar locality of Gurugram. This is where guru Dronacharya use to bathe after teaching archery lessons. This area also has a temple dedicated to Dronacharya, a temple of Lord Shiva believed to have been set up by Pandavas.

== Nearby attractions ==
=== Eklavya temple ===
There is an Eklavya temple (Hindi: एकलव्य मंदिर) temple in honor of Mahabharata fame Eklavya in Khandsa village in Sector 37 of Gurugram city in Haryana state of India. As per folklore, this is the only temple of Eklavya and it is the place where Eklavya cut his thumb and offered to the guru Drona. Locals want the government to develop a tourism circuit in honor of Drona and Eklavya.

=== Sheetla Mata Mandir Gurgaon ===
Sheetla Mata Mandir Gurgaon is a temple dedicated to the Mata Sheetla Devi, who is Kripi (wife of Guru Dronacharya). the teacher of the Pandavas and Kauravas according to the Indian epic Mahabharata. Gurgaon is named after him. The temple is located on Sheetla mata Road in Gurgaon city of Gurgaon district in the state of Haryana in India. It lies between sector 6, 81 and 12-A, near the ammunition depot.

== See also ==
- Basai wetland
