= R. Sreedhar Shenoy =

Indian field hockey coach (1948–2020)

- Born: 1948; Kerala
- Died: 14 June 2020 (aged 71–72)
- Occupation: Field hockey coach

R. Sreedhar Shenoy was a field hockey coach from Kerala, who popularised the game in the state. He is known as the Dronacharya of Kerala hockey.

Shenoy is known for nurturing the majority of hockey coaches in Kerala. Several players, who coached under him, have gone onto play for Indian Railways, Air India and Services. He is said to have coached more than 35000 children and produced more than 5000 players including Olympian Dinesh Naik, Subaida Salim, Geetha and Eliyamma Mathew. He died on 14 June 2020 due to stomach related problems at the age of 72.
