= Khandsa =

- Village
- Nickname: Eklavya mandir
- Location of Gurgaon in Haryana Gurgaon (India)
- Coordinates: 28°25′19″N 76°59′24″E
- Country: India
- State: Haryana
- District: Gurgaon district
- Sector: 37

Government
  - Body: Municipal Corporation of Gurgaon
  - Mayor: Vimal Yadav
  - Vidhan Sabha constituency: Gurgaon City
  - Planning agency: Haryana Urban Development Authority
  - Municipal Corporation of Gurgaon: Civic agency
- Elevation: 712 ft (217 m)

Population
  - Total: 876,824

Languages
  - Main spoken: Haryanvi, Hindi
- Time zone: UTC+5:30 (IST)
- PIN: 122xxx
- Area code: 0124
- Vehicle registration: HR-26 (North); HR-55 (Commercial); HR-72 (South); HR 76 Pataudi (Gurgaon)
- Website: gurgaon.nic.in

Khandsa is a village in Gurgaon mandal in Gurgaon District, Haryana State, India. It has a population of about 9959 persons living in some 1912 households. It lies on the NH-8 highway. It is near New Delhi, India.

Notable people

Nawab Satpal Tanwar, a Famous Indian Social Activist and Politician, Founder & National President of Bhim Sena & Sanvidhan Suraksha Party belongs to village Khandsa of where he was born.

== Geography ==
Nearby villages are Naharpur Roopa (2.333 km), Hari Nagar (Duma) (2.535 km), Shahpur-Jat (2.626 km), Kadipur (2.711 km), Kherki Daula (3.112 km), Rampura Safedar Nagar (3.346 km).

== Administration ==
Khandsa Pin Code is 122004.

== Eklavya temple ==
There is an Eklavya temple in honour of Ekalavya in Khandsa. As in the Mahabharata, this is the only temple of Eklavya and it is the place where Eklavya cut his thumb and offered to guru Drona.
