= Brihadbala =

King in Hindu literature

- Texts: Mahabharata
- Region: Kosala

Genealogy
- Parents: Vishrutanavanta (father)
- Children: Barhināman
- Dynasty: Suryavamsha

Brihadbala (Sanskrit: बृहद्बल, IAST: Bṛhadbala) is a king mentioned in Hinduism, including the Hindu epic Mahabharata. He is also known by the name Srutayu according to the Linga Purana. He is described to be the last king of the Kosala Kingdom. In the Kurukshetra War, Brihadbala fought for the Kauravas and was killed by Abhimanyu. his son was Barhināman who ruled Ayodhya after him.

== Legend ==
According to the Vishnu Purana and the Bhagavata Purana, Brihadbala is a descendant of Rama on Kusha's side, and belongs to the Suryavamsha (Solar dynasty). Makhan Jha, in his Anthropology of Ancient Hindu Kingdoms: A Study in Civilizational Perspective claims that Brihadbala is the fifteenth king after Rama. Brihadbala is considered to be the last king of the line of Ikshvaku; the dynasty spanned 31-32 generations between Rama and him.

The Mahabharata describes Brihadbala as the ruler of Kingdom of Kosala. He was subjugated by Bhima during the Rajasuya sacrifice. However, a subsequent conquest by Karna during his Digvijaya Yatra resulted in Brihadbala's ultimate allegiance to the Kauravas during the Kurukshetra War. On the thirteenth day of the war, when Abhimanyu, Arjuna's son, penetrates into the Padmavyuha, Brihadbala fights him, along with a host of Kaurava warriors including Drona, Kripa, Karna, Ashwatthama, and Kritavarma. In the fierce duel that ensued between Brihadbala and Abhimanyu, Brihadbala was mortally wounded by Abhimanyu's arrows.

According to the Shiva Purana, Brihadbala is succeeded by his son, Barhināman.
