= Abhimanyu =

Son of Arjuna in the Mahabharata

- Mahabharata character
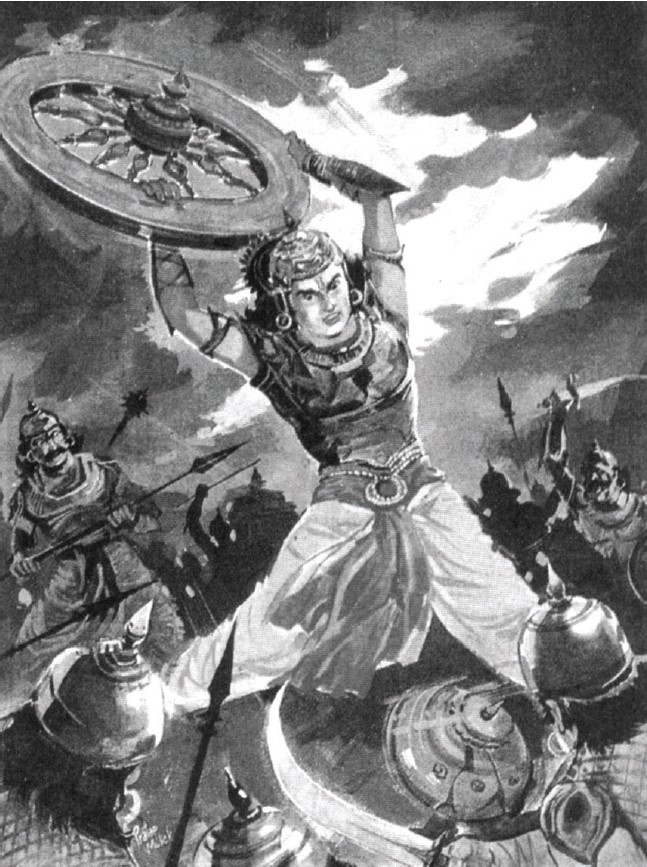
- Abhimanyu fighting with a chariot wheel after his weapons were shattered by enemy troops, illustration by Pratap Mullick, c. 1970

Information
- Affiliation: Pandavas
- Weapon: Bow and arrow; Sword
- Family: Arjuna (father); Subhadra (mother)
- Spouse: Uttarā
- Children: Parikshit
- Relatives: Karna; Yudhishthira; Bhima; Nakula; Sahadeva (paternal uncles); Krishna; Balarama (maternal uncles); Shrutakarma; Iravan; Babruvahana (half-brothers)
- Dynasty: Chandravamsha; Yaduvamsha

Abhimanyu (Sanskrit: अभिमन्यु, IAST: Abhimanyu) is a character in the ancient Hindu epic Mahābhārata. He is born to Arjuna—the third Pandava brother—and Subhadra—a Vrishni princess. He was also one of the few individuals, along with his father, who knew the technique to enter the Chakravyuha, a powerful military formation. Abhimanyu was raised by his maternal family in Dvārakā because the Pandavas had been exiled for thirteen years by their cousins, the Kauravas. After his father's return, his marriage was arranged with Uttarā, the princess of the Matsya Kingdom.

Abhimanyu played a significant role on the Pandava side during the Kurukshetra War. The Kaurava soldiers banded together on the thirteenth day of the battle to build the Chakravyuha in an effort to defeat the Pandavas. With Arjuna diverted to another part of the battlefield, Abhimanyu was the only one who was able to burst through the formation and take on the Kaurava soldiers. At that point, seven maharathis (powerful warriors) launched simultaneous attacks on him while violating several kshatriya codes, and he was killed at the age of sixteen.

Abhimanyu's posthumous son Parikshit saved the Kuru lineage from extinction, and became a well known monarch celebrated both in the Mahabharata and the Bhagavata Purana.

== Etymology and epithets ==
Abhimanyu is a Sanskrit name that translates to "one who is with self-respect". It can alternatively be rendered as "heroic" or "fiery". In the Mahabharata, a number of epithets are used to describe Abhimanyu. The following is a list of some of them.

- Ārjuni - 'son of Arjuna'.
- Arjunātmaja - 'son of Arjuna'.
- Arjunāpara - 'he who is equal to Arjuna'.
- Phālguni - 'son of Phalguna (Arjuna)'.
- Śakrātmajatmāja - 'son of Indra's son (Arjuna)'.
- Saubhadra - 'son of Subhadra'.
- Janmavira - 'one who is brave from birth'.

== Literary background ==
The Mahabharata, a Sanskrit epic from the Indian subcontinent, tells the tale of Abhimanyu. He is related to the epic's hero Arjuna, who was his father, and Krishna, his maternal uncle who is also a key figure in the Mahabharata. The text, which has undergone numerous modifications, edits, and interpolations over many years, is written in classical Sanskrit. The oldest passages in the text that has survived date back to perhaps around 400 BCE. Scholars have attempted to construct a critical edition, relying mostly on a study of the "Bombay" edition, the "Poona" edition, the "Calcutta" edition and the "south Indian" editions of the manuscripts. The most accepted version is one prepared by scholars led by Vishnu Sukthankar at the Bhandarkar Oriental Research Institute, preserved at Kyoto University, Cambridge University and various Indian universities.

The fight between the five Pandavas, and the one hundred Kauravas is at the heart of the narrative of the Mahabharata. The epic's main focus is on their great conflict, known as the Kurukshetra War. The majority of the text describes the various battles between the warriors of two sides during the war. The Mahabharata is divided into eighteen parva or 'books'. Like many other major characters, Abhimanyu is also introduced in the Adi Parva—the first of the 18 parvas. The seventh book's Abhimanyu-badha Parva focuses on Abhimanyu, who is lauded throughout, and has a thorough account of how he died.

== Legends ==
=== Previous life ===
The Sambhava Parva of the Adi Parva narrates the reason behind Abhimanyu's birth and his early demise. It was once proposed at a meeting of the gods that Varchas, the son of the lunar god Soma, take on the earthly form of Abhimanyu and aid in the annihilation of evil men. Soma, who was unwilling to give up his son, accepted to their proposal only on the condition that Varchas would come back to him once he (as Abhimanyu) became sixteen.

=== Birth and early life ===
Abhimanyu was born to Arjuna—the third of the Pandava brothers—and his wife Subhadra, who belonged to the Yadava clan. Arjuna first instructed him in military education before the Pandavas were coerced into giving up their kingdom and banished for thirteen years by their cousin Duryodhana. During this time, Subhadra remained in the kingdom of Dvaraka, the home of her brother, and raised Abhimanyu there with the help of her family. Abhimanyu received military instruction from his uncles Balarama and Krishna as well as his maternal cousin Pradyumna. When the Pandavas returned from exile, Duryodhana refused to give them their kingdom back, which ultimately sparked the Kurukshetra War.

Arjuna taught Abhimanyu the strategy for breaking into chakravyuha, a formidable military structure that resembled a labyrinth of several defensive walls. Abhimanyu was one of the four warriors who knew this skill, according to Yudhishthira. A later folklore adds that Abhimanyu learned this information from Arjuna while still inside his mother's womb. However, he was unable to hear how to exit the chakravyuha, and this incomplete knowledge later contributed to his demise.

=== Marriage ===
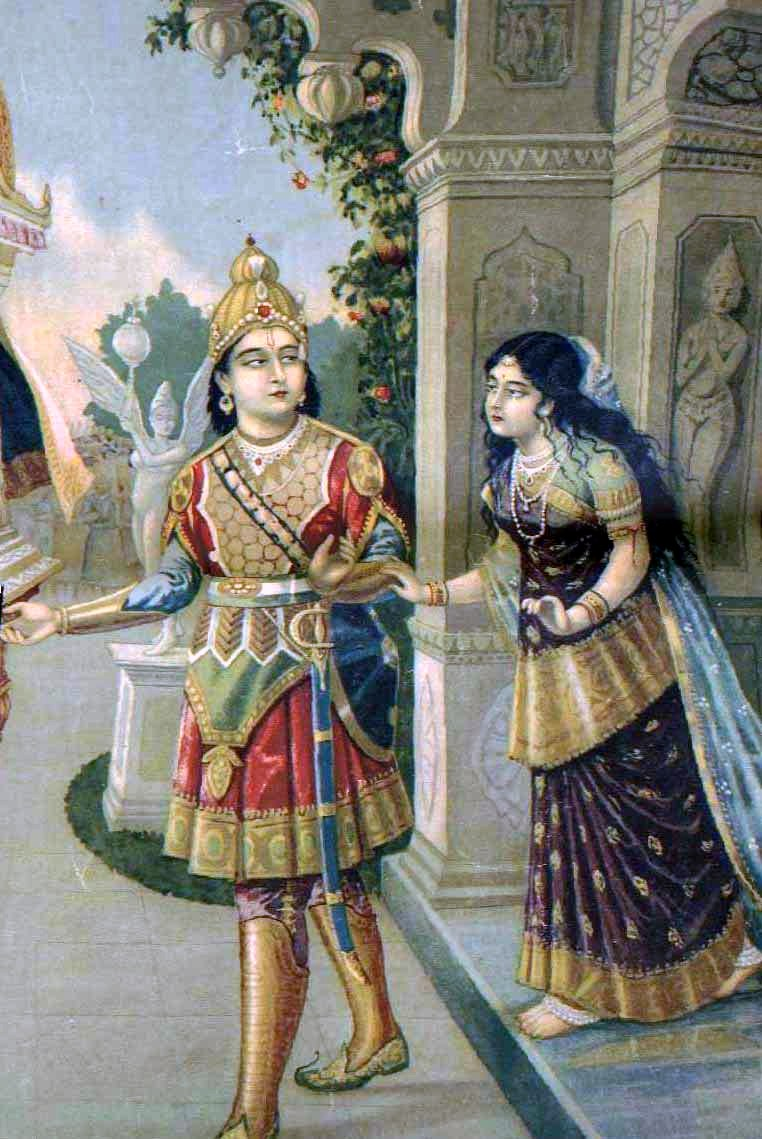
Abhimanyu consoling Uttarā before leaving for the Kurukshetra War, 20th-century print

Abhimanyu's marriage is narrated in the Virata Parva, the fourth book of the epic. The Pandavas had to live secretly and avoid being discovered during the final year of their exile. The Pandavas stayed in the kingdom of Matsya in disguise and served its ruler Virata. The king's daughter, Uttarā, was taught dancing and music by Arjuna, who pretended to be a eunuch named Brihannala. When their year of disguise came to an end and the Pandavas' true identities were revealed, Virata asked Arjuna to marry Uttarā. However, Arjuna declined because he had served as her teacher during that time. Instead, he put forward the idea of Uttara and Abhimanyu being married. The marriage ceremony was held in the city of Upaplavya. Abhimanyu had gotten his wife pregnant before his death, and she later gave birth to a son, Parikshit. Following the Pandavas' victory in the Kurukshetra War, Parikshit becomes the heir-apparent of Yudhishthira and later takes Yudhisthira's place as ruler of Hastinapura.

=== The Kurukshetra War ===
Abhimanyu sided with the Pandavas in the Kurukshetra War. Even though he was a young man, he exhibited amazing bravery in the conflict. In the fifth book of the epic, Udyoga Parva, Abhimanyu was categorised as a Atirathi ('leader of leaders of car-divisions') by Bhishma, the Kuru gransire who oversaw the Kaurava side during the first eleven days of the conflict.

The Bhishma Parva contains a thorough account of the battles fought during the first eleven days of the war, when Bhishma served as the Kaurava side's commander. Abhimanyu first engaged in combat with Brihatbala, the king of Kosala, on the first day. Later, during a terrible battle with Bhishma, Abhimanyu broke Bhishma's flagstaff. He engaged in combat alongside Lakshmana, son of Duryodhana, on the second day. He then occupied a position in the semi-circular phalanx Arjuna had built, known as the Ardha Chandra Vyuha. He also fought the Gandharas ferociously and when he invaded Shalya, the Magadha king Jayatsena and his elephant were slaughtered. After assisting Bhima in battle, Abhimanyu went on to defeat Lakshmana once more. Additionally, Vikarna, Chitrasena, and other Kaurava brothers were vanquished by Abhimanyu. Later, he assumed his place in the Shringataka Vyuha built by Dhrishtadyumna, the commander of the Pandava side. Abhimanyu also defeated Ambashtha and Alambusha. He then engaged in combat with Sudishna, Duryodhana, and Brihatbala.

=== Death ===
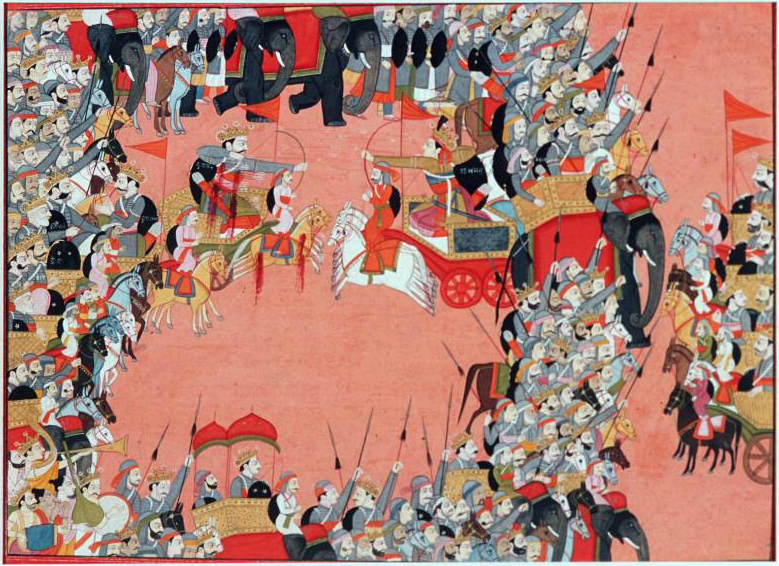
Abhimanyu (center, in golden armour) battles the Kaurava warrior Dushasana inside the chakravyuha, painting from a manuscript of the Mahabharata, c 1803

Abhimanyu's death is described in detail in the Abhimanyu-vadha Parva of the Drona Parva, the eighth book of the Mahabharata. After Bhishma was defeated on the eleventh day, Drona—who had formerly been both the Pandavas' and the Kauravas' teacher—was named the new leader of the Kaurava side. After a lacklustre performance on the twelfth day, Duryodhana reprimanded him and reminded him of his vow to vanquish the Pandavas. Drona made the decision to start the chakravyuha after feeling embarrassed. As Arjuna was skilled in chakravyuha defence, he requested Duryodhana to divert Arjuna. On the thirteenth day, Arjuna was detoured to the south by Samsaptakas. The army of Kauravas, led by Dronacharya, then arranged themselves in the array of Chakravyuha. The maharathis such as Drona, Karna, Shalya, Kripa, Ashvatthama, Duryodhana, Jayadratha, Duhshasana and Bhurishrava formed the wheel formation, guarded by millions of soldiers. The Pandava forces advanced to engage in combat, but all were forced back by Drona's lethal arrows. As one of the few people who was capable of entering the chakravyuha, Abhimanyu was given the task by Yudhisthira. Abhimanyu reminded Yudhishthira that he didn't know the escape from the formation, but Yudhishthira persuaded him that their warriors were following him to help in case of fatal danger.

Abhimanyu then commanded his charioteer, Sumitra, to head for Drona, while Pandavas trailed behind him. The Kaurava soldiers attacked Abhimanyu, but he cut through their formidable defence and tore it apart. Then formidable Kaurava warriors challenged him. In separate battles, Abhimanyu defeated Duryodhana, Dushashana, Drona, Ashvathama, Karna, Shakuni. He also slew numerous enemy warriors, including the son of King Asmaka, the brothers of Shalya, Rukmaratha, Lakshmana, Vrindaka, Brihatbala, Asvaketu, and the Bhoja prince Martikavata. Duryodhana, outraged at his son's murder, instructed Drona to alter the original plan to assassinate Abhimanyu. The Pandavas forces were stopped by Jayadratha, who ultimately vanquished all four of them, leaving Abhimanyu all by himself. Shakuni, Duryodhana's infamous uncle, devised a strategy to attack him simultaneously that violated the rules of war. Abhimanyu was immediately assailed by the six maharathis—Duryodhan, Dushasan, Dronacharya, Kripacharya, Karna and Shakuni. They demolished his chariot, killed the horses of his chariot, broke his weapons, and shot him with numerous arrows. He continued to fight using a chariot wheel even though he was exhausted and hopeless at this point, killing numerous Gandhara soldiers. A blow to the head from Dushashana's son ultimately caused him to succumb to his wounds and he died as a hero.

== In derivative works ==
=== Sasirekha Parinayam ===
While the Mahabharata mentions Uttarā as Abhimanyu's only wife, the Telugu folktale Sasirekha Parinayam adds the story of Abhimanyu marrying Sashirekha (also known as Vatsala), the daughter of his uncle Balarama, before marrying Uttarā. According to the story, Abhimanyu fell in love with Sasirekha while staying in Dvaraka, but Revathi wanted her to marry Lakshmana, Duryodhana's son. Ghatotkacha, Bhima's son who wanted to help his cousin, disguised himself as Sashirekha and broke Lakshmana's arm. As a result of the incident, Lakshmana ended his marriage to Sashirekha. The real Sashirekha and Abhimanyu were married in the forest at the time. No such has been attested in the Mahabharata.

=== Wayang ===
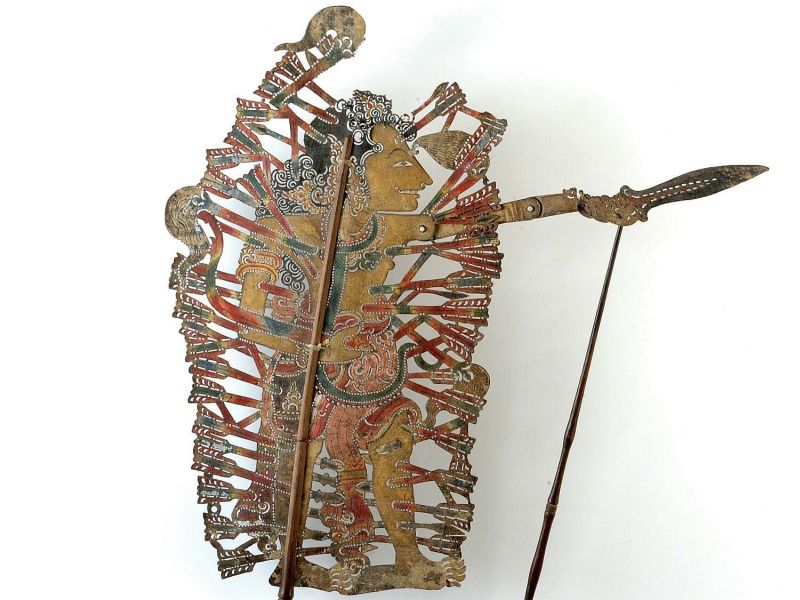
Abimanyu wayang (puppetry) figures in Indonesian culture

In Indonesia, in Javanese wayang culture, Abhimanyu (Indonesian: Abimanyu) is an important figure. His figure in Indonesian - Javanese culture, has developed and is different from the version in India.

In the wayang, Abimanyu is told as a character who is gentle, well-behaved, honest, firm-hearted, responsible, and brave. He is also known as Angkawijaya, Jaya Murcita, Jaka Pengalasan, Partasuta, Kirityatmaja, Sumbadraatmaja, Wanudara and Wirabatana. In this version of story, he has 13 other siblings, possesses two divine revelations — Hidayat, which can make him understand everything, and Makutha Raja, gained because of his solemn asceticism. He is taught military by his father (Arjuna) directly, while he got mysticism from his grandfather, Bagawan Abiyasa. Abimanyu lived in the Palangkawati knighthood after defeating Prabu Jayamurcita. His wives are Dewi Siti Sundari, daughter of Prabu Kresna, king of the Dwarawati state with Dewi Pratiwi. The story of Abimanyu's marriage to Siti Sundari was performed in a leather puppet show with the title Alap-Alapan Siti Sundari or Jaya Murcita Ngraman. Dewi Utari, daughter of King Matsyapati and Dewi Ni Yutisnawati, from the country of Wirata, and the son of Parikesit. The story of Abimanyu's marriage to Utari was performed in a wayang kulit stage with the title Putu Rabi Nini or Kalabendana Gugur.

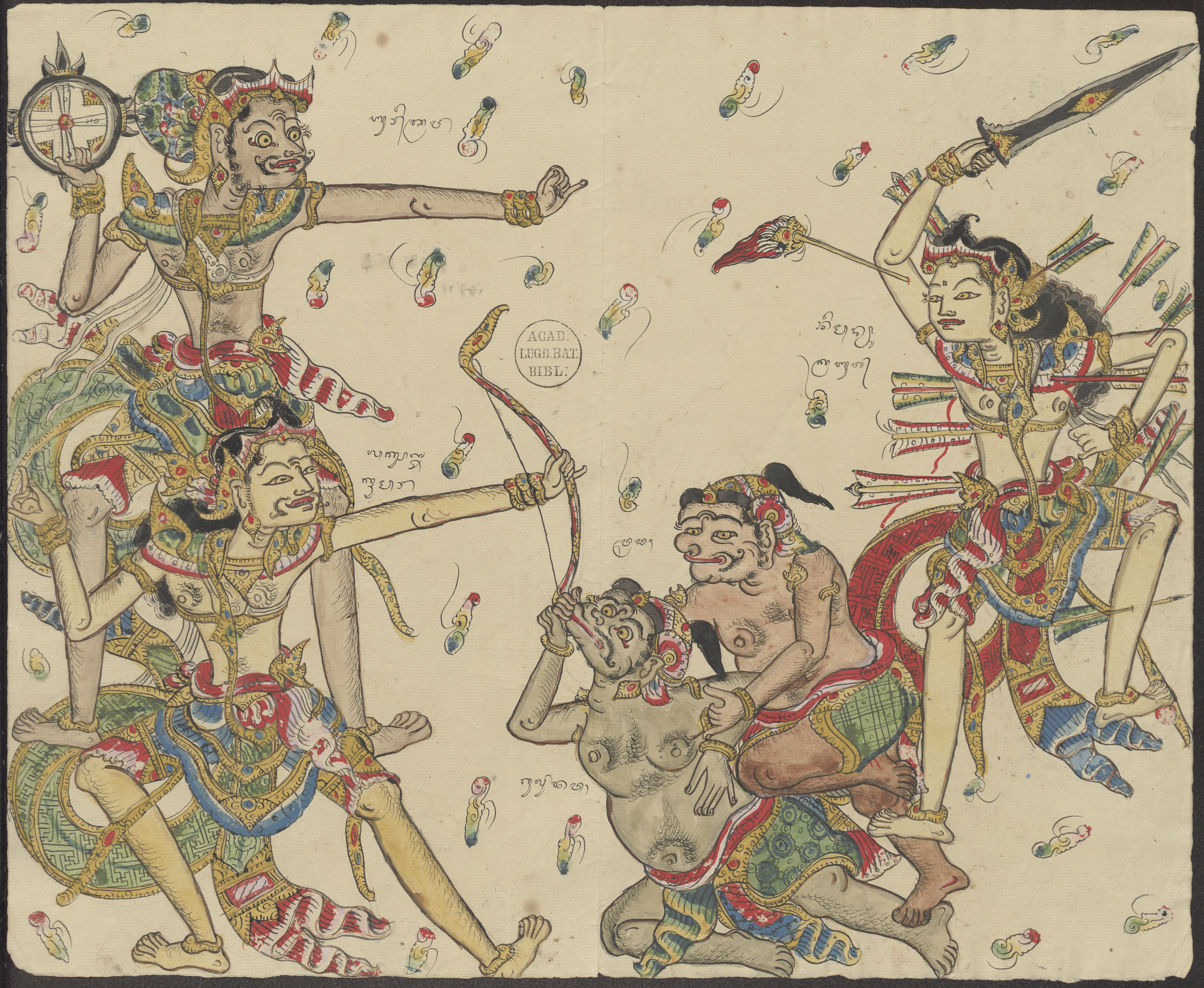
Laksmana Kumara shoots arrows at Abimanyu

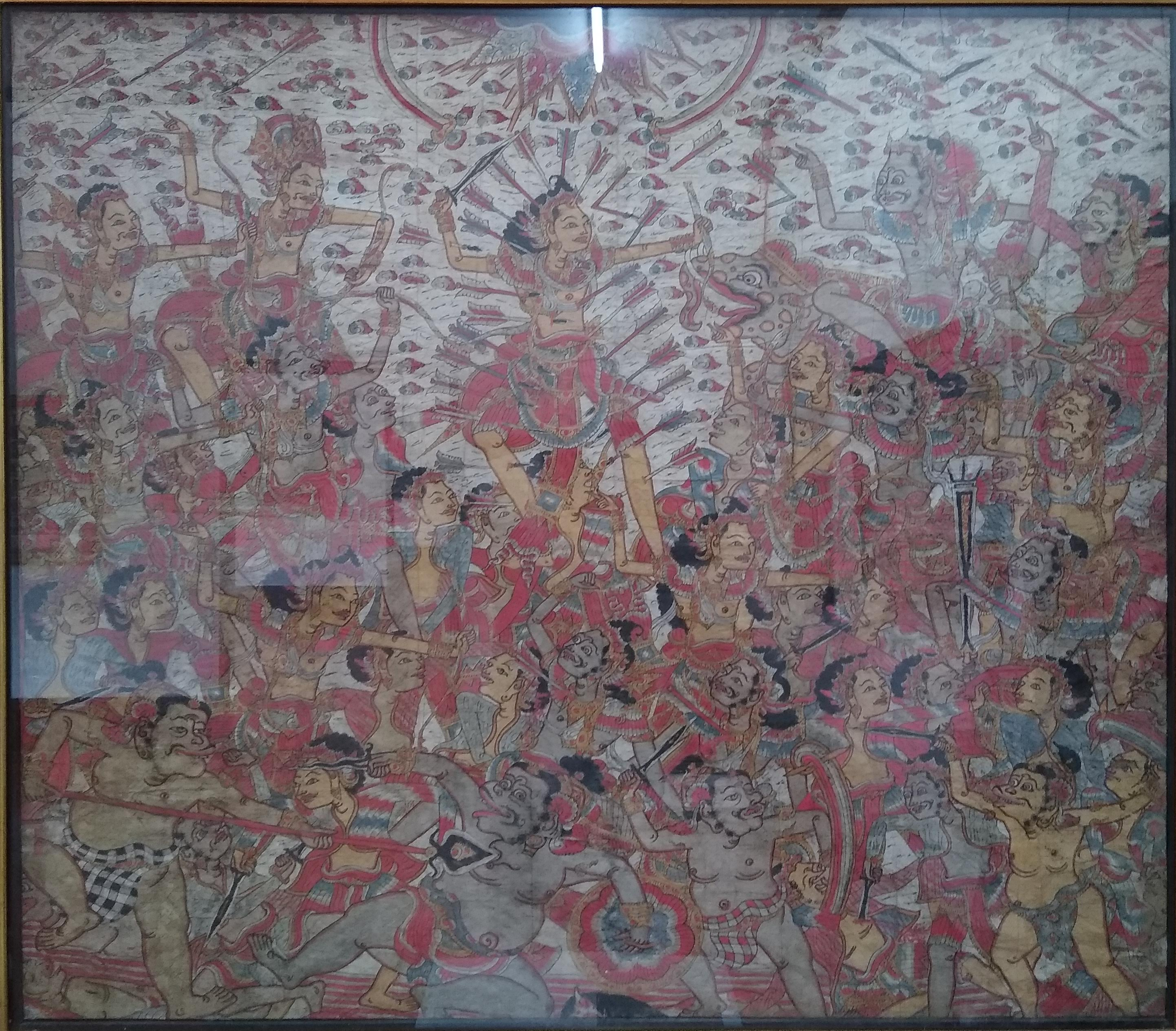
The Death of Abimanyu, a painting at the Neka Art Museum in Ubud, Bali

Abimanyu died in Baratayuda, the battle between the Kauravas against the Pandavas in the Kurukshetra field. At that time, only three knights from the Pandavas were on the battlefield and mastered the war strategy, namely Bhima, Arjuna, and Abimanyu. Ghatotkacha left because Karna stretched out Kunta Wijayadanu's weapon. Other knights lured Bima and Arjuna from the Kauravas to get out of the battlefield, so Abimanyu was the only one that the Pandavas relied on at that time.

After all his brothers died, Abimanyu forgot to set up the battle formation. He advanced alone into the middle of the Kauravas line and was trapped in the deadly formation his enemy had set up. The Kauravas rained weapons on Abimanyu's body until Abimanyu fell and fell from his horse—in the wayang, the wounds of charcoal from the basket are depicted (a lot of them). Abimanyu looks like a hedgehog because of the various weapons stuck in his body. According to the story, the incident was a risk of taking an oath when proposing to Dewi Utari. Abimanyu once swore that he was still single and stated that if he took a perjury oath, he was ready to die being beaten and impaled by various weapons of his enemies. Abimanyu took a perjury oath because, at that time, he had already married Dewi Siti Sundari.

With various weapons stuck all over his body, Abimanyu could no longer walk. However, Abimanyu did not give up. He even managed to kill the future crown prince of Astina, namely Lesmana Mandrakumara, son of Prabu Duryodana, by throwing the Pulanggeni kris after penetrating the bodies of four other soldiers. At that time, the Kauravas knew that killing Abimanyu required cutting off the langsang in his chest. In the end, Abimanyu was killed by the mace of Kyai Glinggang or Galih Asem belonging to Jayadrata, a knight from Banakeling.

== In popular culture ==
In 1974, a base named INS Abhimanyu was established symbolizing the character of Abhimanyu. On 1 May 1980, the Premier Chariot Base in Mumbai was commissioned as the permanent base for the unit. The Indian Maritime Special Forces (IMSF) is based with INS Abhimanyu.

In media adaptations, Abhimanyu has been portrayed by actors such as Ashok Kumar in Uttara Abhimanyu (1946 film), S. M. Kumaresan in Tamil Abhimanyu (1948 film), Akkineni Nageswara Rao and Gemini Ganesan in the Telugu and Tamil film version of the film Mayabazar (1957) respectively, Nandamuri Balakrishna in the Telugu Film Daana Veera Soora Karna (1977), Mayur Verma in B. R. Chopra's Mahabharat (1988 TV series), Anuj Sharma in Krishna (TV series), Paras Arora in Star plus's Mahabharat (2013 TV series), Meghan Jadhav in SET's series Suryaputra Karna, and Nikhil Kumar in Kannada movie Kurukshetra (2019).
