= Sheetla Mata Mandir Gurgaon =

Temple in Haryana, India

Sheetla Mata Temple, Gurugram
- Location within Haryana Location within India

Religion
- Affiliation: Hinduism
- District: Gurugram
- Deity: Shitala
- Governing body: Shree Mata Sheetla Shrine Board

Location
- Location: Gurugram Village
- State: Haryana
- Country: India
- Interactive map of Sheetla Mata Temple, Gurugram
- Coordinates: 28.4783°N 77.0305°E

Specifications
- Temple: 1
- Monument: 1
- Elevation: 217 m (712 ft)

Website
- http://sheetlamatamandir.in/

Sheetla Mata Temple (/ˈʃiːtlə ˈmɑːtə/ SHEET-lə MAH-tə, Hindi: [ʃɾiː ˈʃiːtlaː maːˈtaː ˈməndɪr]) is a Hindu temple dedicated to the goddess Shitala (Sheetla), wife of Guru Dronacharya who was the teacher of the Pandavas and Kauravas according to an Indian epic Mahabharata. The temple is located on Sheetla Mata Road in old Gurugram (earlier known as Gurgaon) city of Gurugram district in the state of Haryana in India.

The shrine is visited by large numbers of people during Navaratri and other festivals.

== History ==
The Sheetla Mata temple is dedicated to the wife of Guru Dronacharya, Kripi (Kirpai), also called Lalitha.

Kirpai, also called Lalita and later Mata Sheetla, used to live in Keshopur village located in the nearby Union Territory of Delhi. Dronacharya her husband used to visit her daily at Keshopur from his Gurugram ashram.

She devoted herself to look after the sick children, specially those suffering from the smallpox. People called her Mata (Mother) out of affection and respect. After her death a temple was built in her honour by the villagers and she began to be remembered as Mata Sheetla or Mata Masani, i.e. 'the goddess of smallpox'.

A legend says that even after Singha had brought and installed the goddess Masani, after her own heart's desire, at village Gurugram, the residents of Keshopur continued to dispute the claims of Gurugram folks. This controversy was put at rest during the time of Begum Samru, the Governor of Jharsa under the Mughals. Her child who had contracted smallpox was cured after being consecrated in the prescribed manner before the goddess Masani at Gurugram. It was then finally established that the goddess had begun to live at village Gurugram.
