= Ekalavya =

Character from the epic Mahabharata

- Mahabharata character
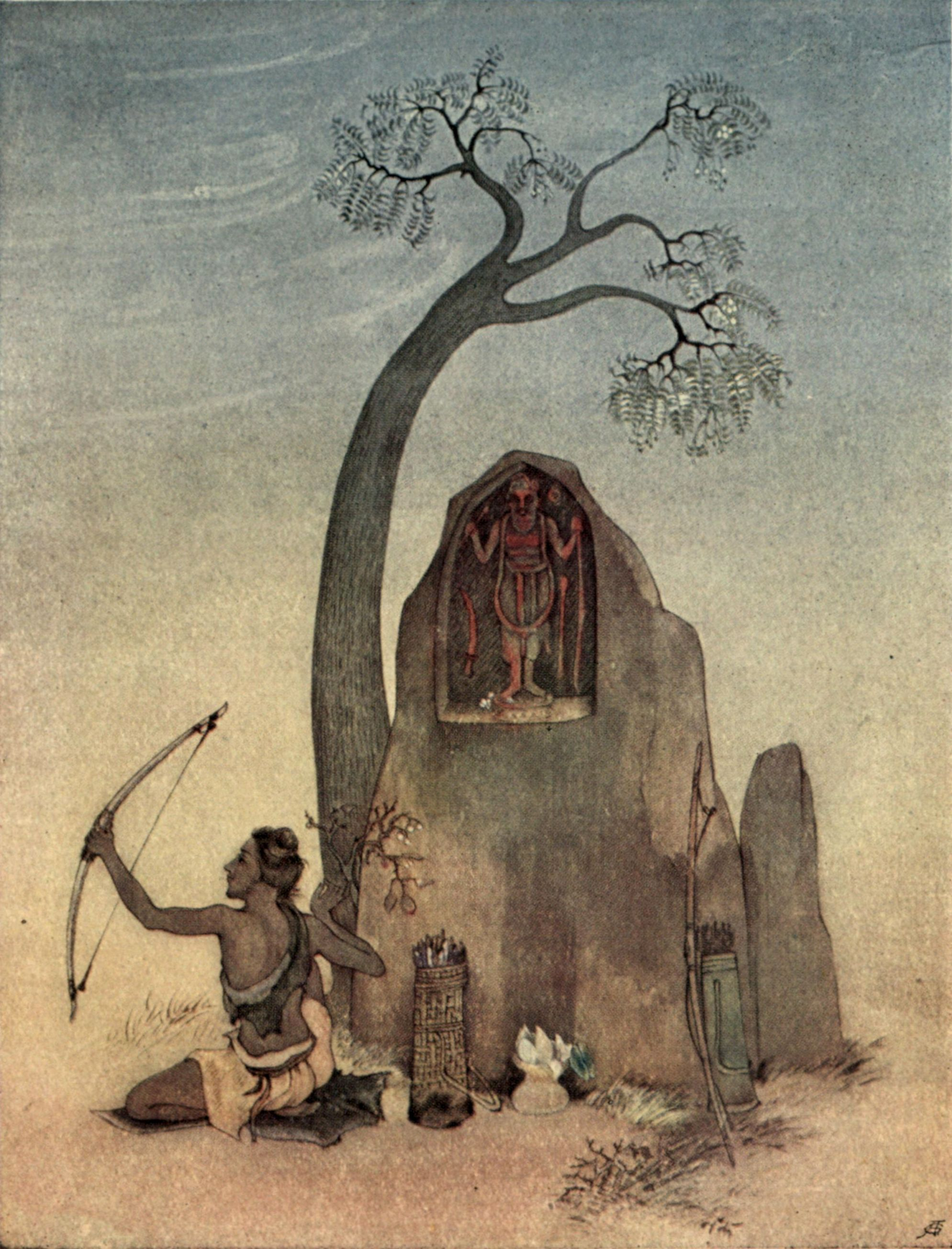
- A painting by Nandalal Bose depicting Ekalavya practicing in front of a clay sculpture of Drona.

Information
- Weapon: Bow and arrow
- Family: Hiranyadhanus (father)
- Children: Ketuman (son)
- Tribe: Nishada

Ekalavya (Sanskrit: एकलव्य, romanized: ekalavya, also spelt as Eklavya) is a character from the Hindu epic Mahābhārata. He is described as a young prince of the Nishadas, a confederation of forest and hill tribes in ancient India.

The son of Hiranyadhanus, a king of the Nishada tribe, Ekalavya seeks to learn archery from Dronacharya, the royal teacher of the Kuru princes, including the epic's main protagonist Arjuna. However, Dronacharya refuses to accept him as a disciple due to his Nishada background, as well as the potential to surpass the Kuru princes. Ekalavya trains himself in the forest using a clay statue of the teacher as his guide. His exceptional skill attracts the attention of Arjuna, who, feeling threatened, complains to Dronacharya. In response, Dronacharya demands Ekalavya’s right-hand thumb as gurudakshina (teacher’s fee), which Ekalavya willingly gives, diminishing his abilities.

Ekalavya is known for his dedication to archery and devotion to Dronacharya, and has become a symbol of Dalit and Tribal rights in contemporary times.

== Legend ==
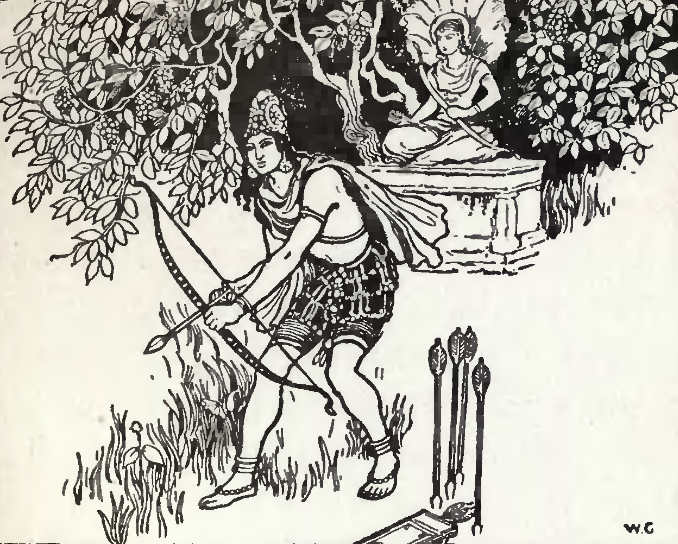
An illustration of Ekalavya's training, c. 1916

=== Mahabharata ===
Eklavya's story is first narrated in the Adi Parva, the first book of the Mahabharata (c. 400 BCE - 400 CE). He is introduced as a young man and the son of Hiranyadhanus, a king of the Nishada (foresters). He approaches Dronacharya—the royal preceptor of the Kuru princes (Pandavas and Kauravas)—to learn archery, but Dronacharya refuses to accept him as a disciple due to his low status as a Nishada as well as his potential to exceed the Kuru princes in archery. Determined to learn archery, Ekalavya goes to the nearby forest, creates a clay replica of Dronacharya, and dedicates himself to rigorous self-practice. His devotion makes him a highly skilled archer. During a hunting expedition, the Pandavas' hunting dog encounters Ekalavya and starts barking. Ekalavya shoots seven arrows into the dog’s mouth, keeping it open without harming it. The dog returns to Arjuna, who is astonished by the display of skill. Upon discovering that Ekalavya considers himself a disciple of Dronacharya, Arjuna feels disappointed and threatened, as Dronacharya has previously declared him to be his best student. Arjuna complains to Dronacharya, who approaches Ekalavya. Dronacharya, upon meeting Ekalavya, acknowledges his dedication but demands a gurudakshina (teacher’s fee)—his right thumb. Ekalavya, out of respect, complies and severs his thumb, which affects his archery skills and ensures Arjuna's superiority.

The Sabha Parva (second book) narrates that Ekalavya later becomes the king of the Nishadas and is considered one of the foremost kings in the Rajasuya Yajna where he honours Yudhishthira by offering him shoes with respect. Ekalavya was noted as a powerful archer and warrior.

In the Udyoga Parva, fifth book of the epic, it is mentioned that Ekalavya was killed by Krishna.

=== Puranas ===
Scholars note that the accounts in the classical Puranic literature suggest two distinct traditions regarding Ekalavya: one that aligns with the epic’s depiction of social hierarchy and exclusion, and another that seeks to reframe his origins as a Kshatriya (warrior class; second highest varna) to justify his participation in royal and martial traditions. (Note: Few Puranas such as the Vayu Purana (c. 300 to 500 CE), Harivamsa (c. 450 CE) and Brahma Purana (c. 900 to 1500 CE) alter Ekalavya's lineage by stating that he was the son of the Yadava prince Devshrava, who abandoned him as an infant, after which he was adopted by the Nishadas.)

Ekalavya's role as an antagonist to the deity Krishna is also expanded in the Puranic literature. The Harivamsa (c. 450 CE) elaborates on Ekalavya's later life and his role in different events, including the details of his death at the hands of Krishna, which were absent from the Mahabharata's primary narrative.

== Legacy ==
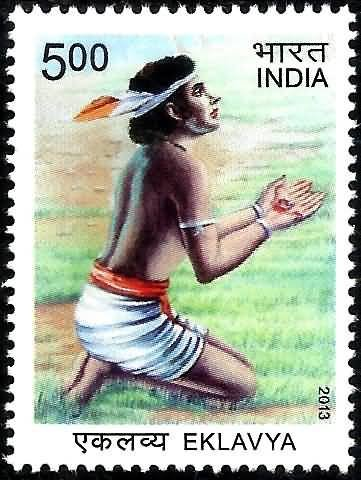
A stamp issued by Government of India in 2013, depicting Ekalavya presenting his thumb

In modern India, Ekalavya has become a symbol of Dalit and tribal rights. Author Gurucharan Das interprets Ekalavya's episode in the Mahabharata as reflecting the evolving social order during the epic's composition, when the caste system was taking shape. Tribes like the Nishadas remained outside the four-fold varna system, facing exclusion and marginalisation. While the Mahabharata presents Ekalavya’s unwavering devotion, it also critiques Drona’s harsh demand, portraying it as daruna (terrible) and tarnishing his image. The epic acknowledges Ekalavya’s humanity, asserting the dignity of those excluded from the social order. Das notes that Ekalavya's story serves as a political rallying point for Dalit communities advocating social change. Unlike the epic’s Ekalavya, who accepted his fate, modern interpretations highlight his struggle for dignity and equality.

In honour of Ekalavya, the Government of India runs an Ekalavya Model Residential School (EMRS) model residential school scheme for Indian tribals.

Additionally, the Ekalavya Award is presented by various state governments, including those of Karnataka, Haryana, and Madhya Pradesh, to individuals under the age of 19 for exceptional achievements in sports.

A temple dedicated to Ekalavya in Khandsa is present in a village in Sector 37 of Gurugram city in Haryana state of India. As per folklore, this is the only temple of Ekalavya and it is the place where Ekalavya cut his thumb and offered to guru Drona.

== See also ==
- Puruṣārtha
- Drona
- Historicity of the Mahabharata
- Ekalavya Temple
- Eklavya Sports Stadium
- Ekalavyan (film)
- Eklavya foundation
