= Dakṣiṇā =

Sanskrit term for honorarium

Dakṣiṇā or Dakshina (Sanskrit: दक्षिणा) is a Sanskrit word found in Hindu, Buddhist, Sikh and Jain literature where it may mean any donation, fees or honorarium given to a cause, monastery, temple, spiritual guide or after a ritual. It may be expected, or a tradition or voluntary form of dāna. The term is found in this context in the Vedic literature.

It may mean honorarium to a guru for education, training or guidance.

== Etymology and description ==
According to Monier Williams, the term is found in many Vedic texts, in the context of "a fee or present to the officiating priest (consisting originally of a cow, Kātyāyana Śrautasūtra 15, Lāṭyāyana Śrautasūtra 8.1.2)", a 'donation to the priest', a 'reward', an 'offering to a guru', a 'gift, donation'.

The word also connotes 'south', a cardinal direction, and by extension, 'the Deccan'. Dakṣiṇā is also found in various other expressions such as dakṣiṇācāra, right-hand path of tantra.

== Gurudakṣiṇā ==
Gurudakṣiṇā refers to the tradition of repaying one's teacher or guru after a period of study or the completion of formal education, or an acknowledgment to a spiritual guide. The tradition is one of acknowledgment, respect, and thanks. It is a form of reciprocity and exchange between student and teacher. The repayment is not exclusively monetary and may be a special task the teacher wants the student to accomplish. A well-known example of an unusual gurudakṣiṇā is the story of Ekalavya.

== In Indian epics ==
In the Mahabharata, gurudakṣiṇā features in the story of Ekalavya that explores the student-teacher relationship, proper authority, and caste. In the tale, Ekalavya, a tribal boy, has a passion to learn and master archery. He asks the famed weapons instructor Dronacharya to be his teacher, but Drona refuses. Ekalavya then fashions a clay statue of Drona and teaches himself archery.

Over time, Ekalavya becomes a skilled archer. One day, he shows off his skill by shooting multiple arrows into a dog's mouth. Arjuna, one of Drona's pupils, sees the dogs and fears that his skills will be surpassed by a tribal boy. Arjuna asks Drona to intervene. Drona goes to Ekalavya, sees the clay statue, and demands the boy's right thumb as payment (gurudakṣiṇā). Ekalavya complies and cuts off his right thumb. This makes him a much less capable archer and ensures that Arjuna, Drona's pupil, remains the world's premier archer.

In the epic Mahabharata, after the right hand thumb as gurudakṣiṇā event, Drona is haunted and wonders if demanding Ekalavya's thumb was proper, Ekalavya goes on to re-master archery with four fingers of his right hand, as well as left hand, thereby becoming a warrior (although not as skilled as Arjuna), becomes accepted as a king, and tells his children that education is for everyone and that no one can close the doors of education on any human being. The story also has a caste angle since Drona and Arjuna, both upper caste, acted to restrict the skills of Ekalavya, a tribal.

== Guru Dakshina (In Literature) ==
Guru Dakshina (Play) in Hindi is written by Bihari Lal Harit in 1969.

== See also ==
- Guru-shishya tradition
