= Chakravyuha =

Military formation used to surround enemies, depicted in the Mahabharata

A depiction of the Padmavyūha or Chakravyūha formation as a labyrinth

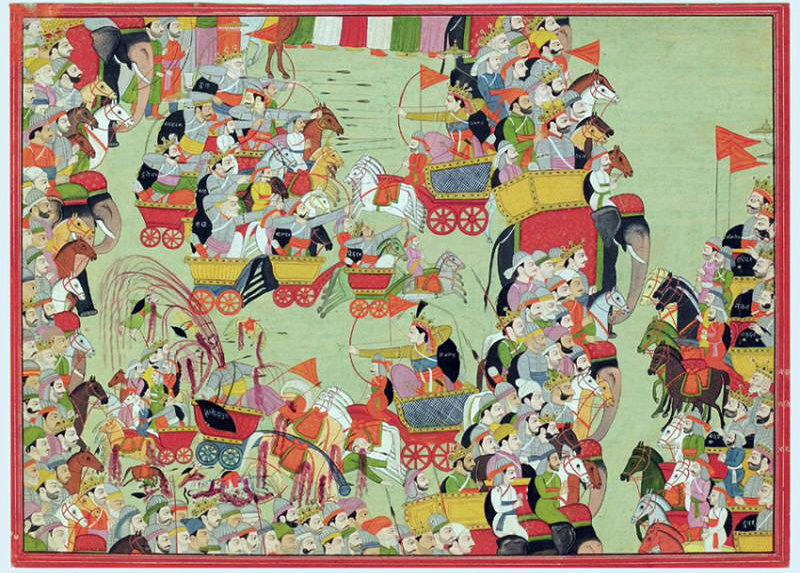
Abhimanyu while entering the Kaurava's chakravyūha

The Padmavyūha (Sanskrit: पद्मव्यूह) or Chakravyūha (Sanskrit: चक्रव्यूह) is a military formation used to surround enemies, depicted in the Hindu epic Mahabharata. It resembles a labyrinth of multiple defensive walls.

== Background ==
The Padmavyūha is a multi-tiered defensive formation that looks like a blooming lotus (पद्म padma) or disc (चक्र chakra) when viewed from above. The warriors at each interleaving position would be in an increasingly tough position to fight against. The formation was used in the battle of Kurukshetra by Dronacharya, who became commander-in-chief of the Kaurava army after the fall of Bhishma Pitamaha.

The various vyūhas (military formations) were studied by the Kauravas and Pandavas alike. Most of them can be beaten using a counter-measure targeted specifically against that formation. In the form of battle described in the Mahabharata, it was important to place powerful fighters in positions where they could inflict maximum damage to the opposing force, or defend their own side. As per this military strategy, a specific stationary object or a moving object or person could be captured, surrounded and fully secured during battle.

The formation begins with two soldiers standing back-to-back, with other such set of soldiers standing at a distance of three hands, drawing up seven circles and culminating in the end which is the place where the captured person or object is to be kept. In order to form the Chakravyuha, the commander has to identify soldiers who will form this formation. The number of soldiers to be deployed and the size of the Chakravyuha is calculated as per the resistance estimated. Once drawn, the foremost soldiers come on either side of the opponent to be captured, engage briefly and then advance. Their place is taken up by the next soldiers on either side, who again engage the opponent briefly and then advance. In this fashion, a number of soldiers pass the enemy and proceed in a circular pattern. By the time the rear of the formation arrives, the oblivious enemy is surrounded on all sides by seven tiers of soldiers. The last soldiers of the formation give the signal of having completed the Chakravyuha. On the signal, every soldier who so far has been facing outwards turns inwards to face the opponent. It is only then that the captured enemy realizes his captivity. The army can continue to maintain the circular formation while leading the captive away.

== Abhimanyu and the Chakravyūha ==
The Chakravyūha or Padmavyūha was a very special formation (vyuha), and knowledge of how to penetrate it was limited to only a handful of warriors on the Pandavas' side, namely: Abhimanyu, Arjuna, Krishna and Pradyumna, of whom only Abhimanyu was present when the Kauravas used it on the battlefield.

A pivotal episode involving the Padmavyūha is the valiant but tragic attempt by Abhimanyu, the son of Arjuna, to breach it. While still in his mother's womb, Abhimanyu overheard Arjuna discussing the method to penetrate the formation but did not learn the means to exit it. During the battle, in Arjuna's absence, Abhimanyu entered the Padmavyūha to support the Pandavas.

After Abhimanyu had penetrated the sixth tier of the formation, all the Kauravas' commanders attacked him simultaneously, which was against the righteous rules of warfare Dharmayuddha, and gradually exhausted and killed him.

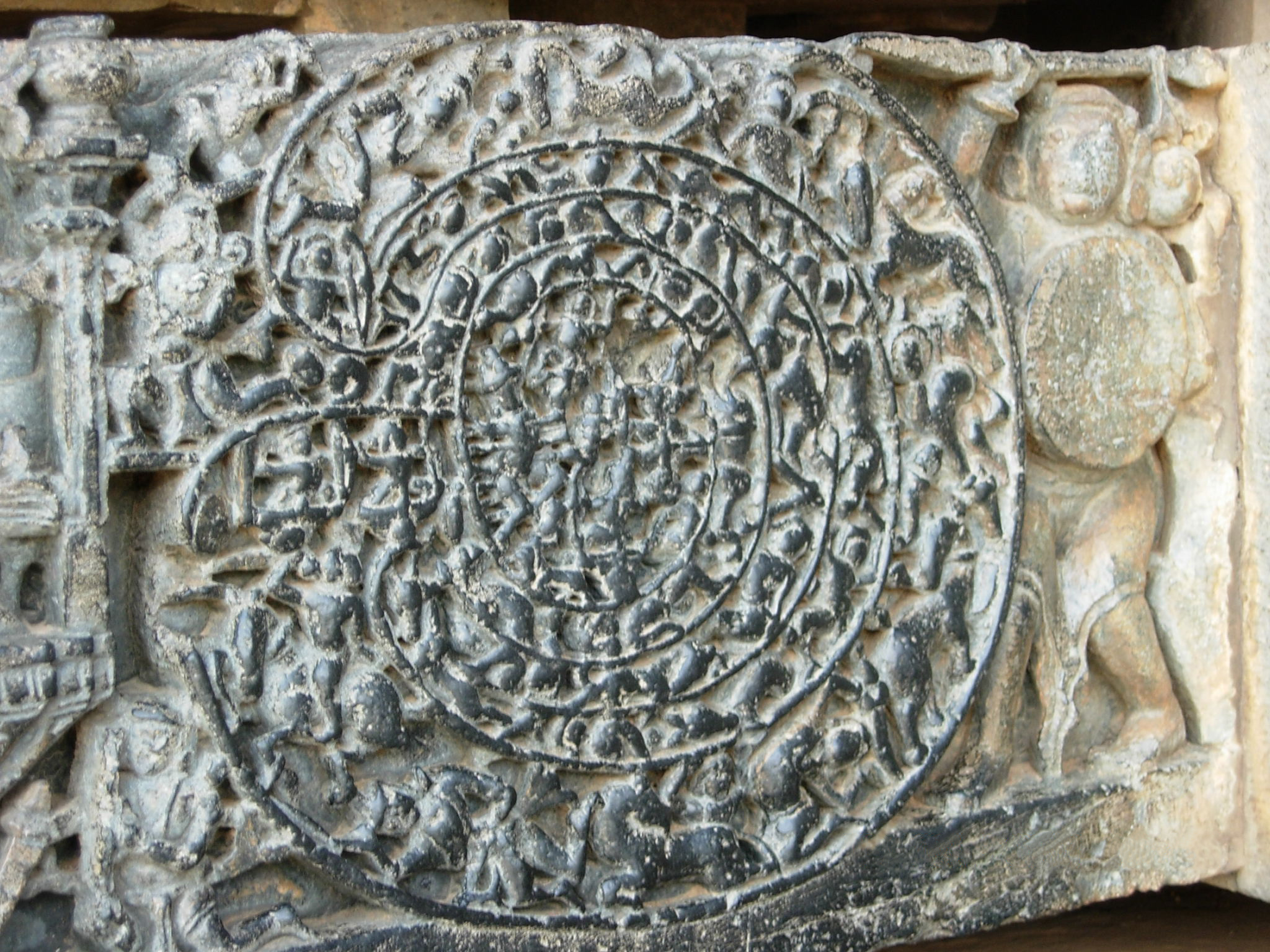
Intricate rock carvings show Abhimanyu entering the Chakra vyuha

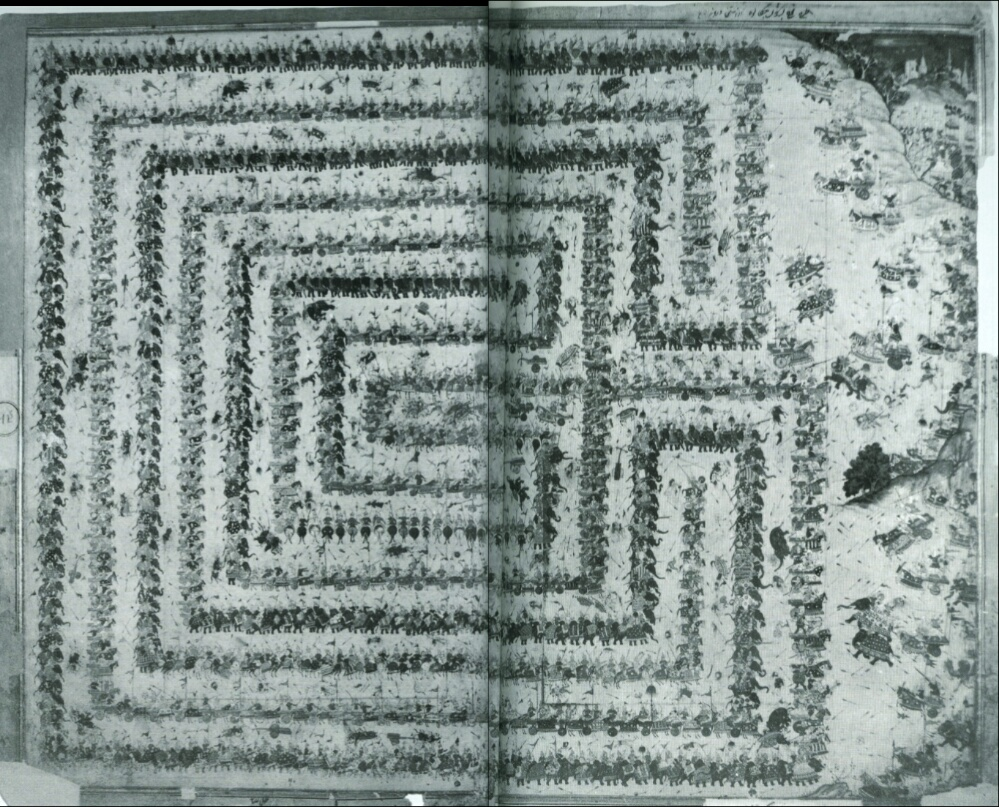
Chakravyuha, folio from the Razmnama

=== Connection to Indian sports ===
It has been noted that the skills used by Abhimanyu to penetrate the Chakravyuha likely have a connection to those used in traditional Indian games such as kabaddi and kho-kho.

== See also ==
- Abhimanyu
- Akshauhini
- Historicity of the Mahabharata
