= Drona =

Guru of the Pandavas and Kauravas in the Hindu epic Mahabharata

- Mahabharata character
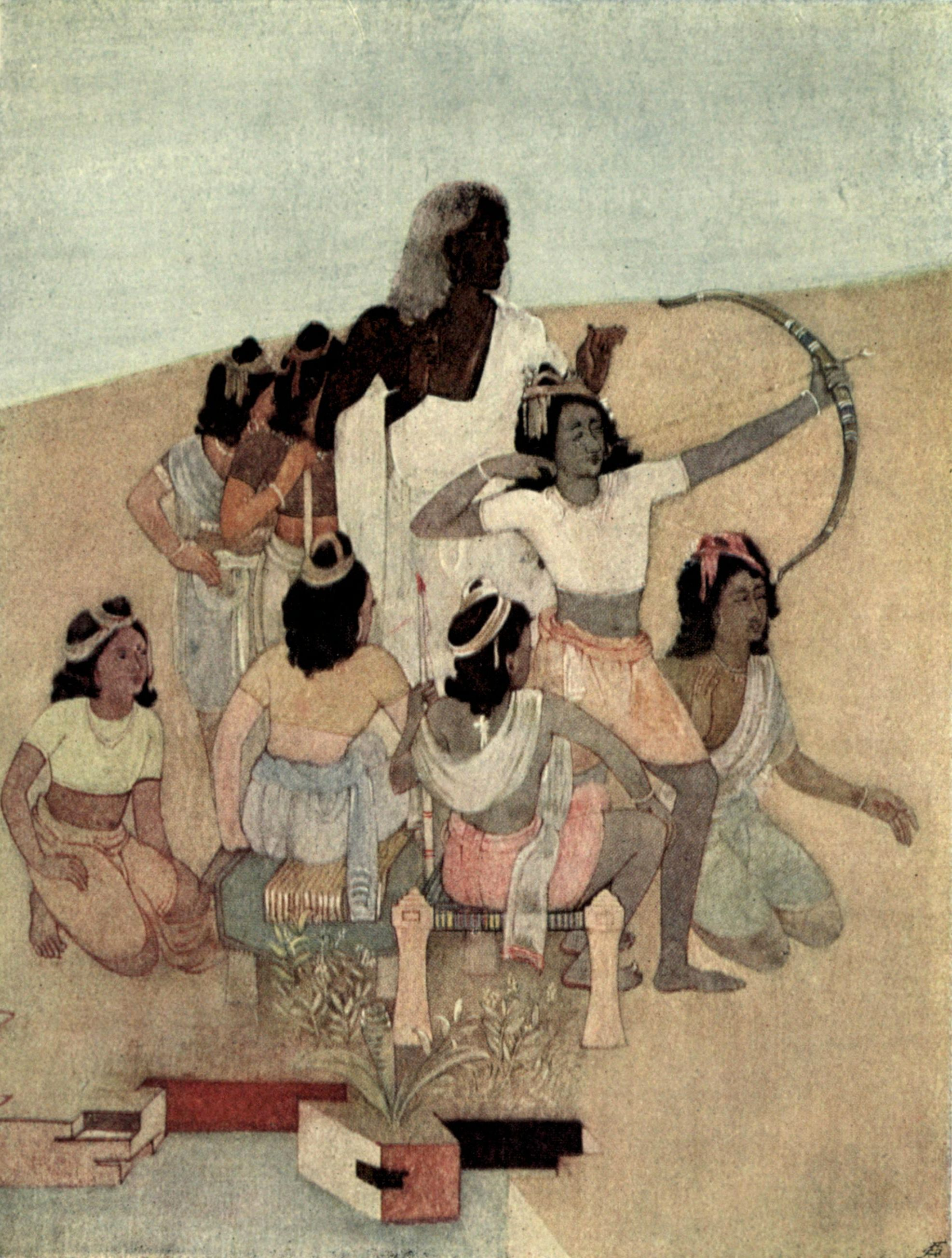
- Drona teaching archery to the Kuru princes, painting by Nandalal Bose

Information
- Position: Acharya of Kuru; Supreme Commander of the Kauravas
- Affiliation: Kauravas
- Weapon: Kodanda
- Family: Bharadvaja (father); Shrutavati (sister)
- Spouse: Kripi
- Children: Ashvatthama (son)
- Relatives: Kripa (brother-in-law)
- Disciples: Pandavas; Kauravas; Dhrishtadyumna

Droṇa (Sanskrit: द्रोण, IAST: Droṇa), also referred to as Dronacharya (Sanskrit: द्रोणाचार्य, IAST: Droṇācārya), is a major character of the Hindu epic Mahabharata. He initially serves as the royal preceptor of the Kauravas and the Pandavas of the Kuru dynasty, and later emerges as one of the epic’s principal counsellors and warriors.

Drona is the son of the sage Bharadvaja, and a descendant of the sage Angirasa. Despite being master of advanced military arts and the divine weapons known as astras, Drona initially chooses a life of poverty until he is humiliated by his childhood friend Drupada, the king of Panchala. With the help of his students, he defeats Drupada and takes away half of the kingdom.

During the Kurukshetra War, Drona serves as the second commander-in-chief of the Kaurava army from the 11th to the 15th day. On the latter day, he is deceived into believing that his son Ashvatthaman has been slain; overwhelmed with grief, he lays down his arms and enters meditation on the battlefield. In this defenseless state, he is beheaded by Dhrishtadyumna, his former pupil and the son of Drupada.

== Etymology ==
Drona's name means vessel, bucket, or quiver. He had many other names, including:

- Dronacharya (द्रोणाचार्य) - teacher Drona
- Bharadwajputra (भार्दवाजपुत्र) - son of Bharadwaja
- Parshuramashishya (परशुरामशिष्य) - disciple of Parashurama

== Birth and early life ==
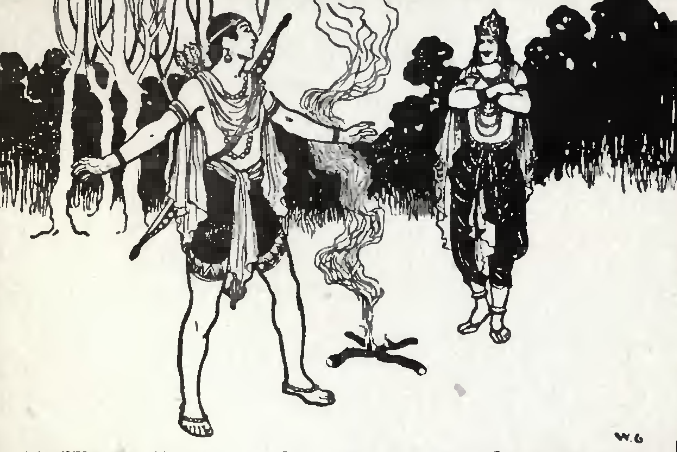
Friendship between Drona and Drupada

On a river side, Sage Bharadwaja saw an apsara named Ghritachi. He was filled with desire and his seed fell into a pot or basket. Inside it, a child developed who was named Drona because he was born in a pot and was brought to the ashram.

In Sage Bharadwaja's ashram, his son Drona and Prince Drupada were educated. Drona and Drupada became best friends, and Drupada promises to share his wealth and kingdom with Drona when he becomes king. Time passed, and Drupada became the king of Panchala, and Drona became a sage and teacher. Drona had a son named Ashwatthama. Drona was not interested in material wealth and became poor.

=== Drupada's insult ===
Once, Drona's son Ashwatthama was playing with his friends. His friends were drinking milk and he wanted to drink it too. But his friends mixed flour with water and gave it to him. Ashamed of being unable to provide for his son due to his poverty, Drona remembers Drupada's promise. He went to Drupada's palace in hopes that Drupada would remember his promise and share his wealth with him. But Drupada, having grown vain, refused. He also insulted Drona by asking how a beggar could be his friend. This outraged Drona and he wanted revenge.

=== Acquisition of weapons ===
There was a sage named Agnivesha who was the former disciple of Drona's father, Bharadwaja. Agnivesha studied the use of weapons from the sage, Agastya, and passed his knowledge to Drona and Drupada. Many years later, Drona heard that the sage Parashurama was donating his wealth. However, by the time Drona reached Parashurama's hermitage in the Mahendra Mountain, the latter had already given away all his wealth. He had only his body and his weapons to give away. Drona chose to have Parashurama's weapons and acquired the knowledge of weapons from the sage. Thus, Drona was able to become a renowned warrior and an instructor of archery and other weapons.

== As the preceptor of the Kuru Kingdom ==
Drona along with Kripa was brought by Bhishma for the education of the Kuru princes. After being insulted by Drupada, Drona and his family went to live with his brother-in-law, Kripa, in Hastinapura. There, Drona encountered the young Kuru princes and demonstrated his skill by pulling their ball from a well using only stalks of grass attached from end-to-end with the power of mantras. Upon learning this feat, Bhishma immediately recognised Drona and appointed him as the preceptor of the Kuru princes. But out of all of them, Arjuna stood was the most prominent. Once, Arjuna had saved Drona from a crocodile while the latter was bathing in a stream. As a reward, Drona gave Arjuna mantras to invoke the super-powerful divine weapon of Brahma known as Brahmashirshastra, but told Arjuna not to use this invincible weapon against any mortal.

Under Drona's tutelage, Duryodhana and Bhima excelled in the art of maces, Ashwatthama excelled in the use of astras, Nakula and Sahadeva excelled in swordsmanship, Yudhishthira excelled in charioteering, and Arjuna excelled in archery. When Arjuna, inspired by his brother Bhima's nocturnal eating, mastered archery in absolute darkness, Drona was moved. Drona was greatly impressed by Arjuna's concentration, determination, and drive, and promised him that he would become the greatest archer on earth. In the modern time, the Don village of the Darauli block in the Siwan district of the present state of Bihar in India is believed to be the location of the ancient Dronacharya Gurukul of the epic Mahabharata.

=== Ekalavya ===
Ekalavya, the son of a Nishadha chief, approached Drona seeking his instruction. But since Ekalavya belonged to the Nishada tribe, Drona refused to train him alongside the Kauravas and Pandavas. Undeterred, Ekalavya began study and practice by himself, having fashioned a clay idol of Drona's to watch over his training. Solely by his determination, Ekalavya became an archer of exceptional skill.

One day, Ekalavya's focus in training was disturbed by the barking of a dog belonging to the Kuru princes. Ekalavya fired arrows that filled up the dog's mouth without spilling blood or causing injury to the dog. The Kuru princes were amazed by the trick and looked for the archer when they saw Ekalavya, who introduced himself as a pupil of Drona's. This made Arjuna jealous and sad about Ekalavya's archery skills as he said that he learnt indirectly from the same guru Drona that Arjuna was learning. Drona was in a tangle: on the one hand, he promised Arjuna that he would make him the greatest archer on earth; on the other hand, Ekalavya had indeed been training as his pupil without his consent, albeit being guided only by his idol. To resolve the matter, Drona accepted Ekalavya as his student, but demanded the thumb on his dominant hand as gurudakshina, or teacher's payment, in order to limit his abilities and further growth in archery, thus pacifying Arjuna. Ekalavya, being an exemplary disciple, immediately cut off his thumb and presented it to Drona.

==== Demonstration by the pupils ====
Dhritarashtra approved the demonstration of weapon-game by the princes. An arena was prepared. Drona entered the arena. Drona worshipped the gods as a form of preparatory rites. Then he invited the Brahmins to bless his disciples. After that the students gave gold, precious stones, clothes and other valuables to the teacher. The teacher blessed him. With this the demonstration started. Bhima and Duryodhana showed their skills by fighting with each other. The mock fight turned into a serious fight. Drona sent Ashwatthama to stop the fight because seeing this the citizens may get triggered by their fight. Then, Arjuna entered the hall with much appreciation and praises from the citizen of Hastinapura. He showed various archery skills to the people. Drona impressed by his beloved student Arjuna's skills then declared that Arjuna is the greatest archer in the world. Then, Karna gatecrashed and entered the arena and surpassed everyone's expectations and performances with the permission of Drona. He then challenged Arjuna for a duel and Kripa demanded that Karna state his lineage. Karna could not answer as he does not know who are his real parents. Duryodhana then made Karna the king of Anga. Then sunset occurred and the duel of Karna and Arjuna was stopped.

=== Drona's revenge ===
After Drona completed the formal training of the Kuru princes, he demanded that they invade Panchala and bring Draupada as their Gurudakshina. Arjuna succeeds in defeating Drupada and brings the captured king to Drona. Drona reminds Drupada about their days of friendship and his false promise before taking away half of the Panchala kingdom. Drona would make Ashwatthama the king of the annexed half of the Panchala kingdom. This action would lead Drupada to perform a sacrificial yagna in order to beget a son who would kill Drona. The sages Upayaja and Yaja helped him to beget such a son Dhrishtadyumna. The sacrificial fire also yielded a daughter, Draupadi.

== Role in the Kurukshetra War ==
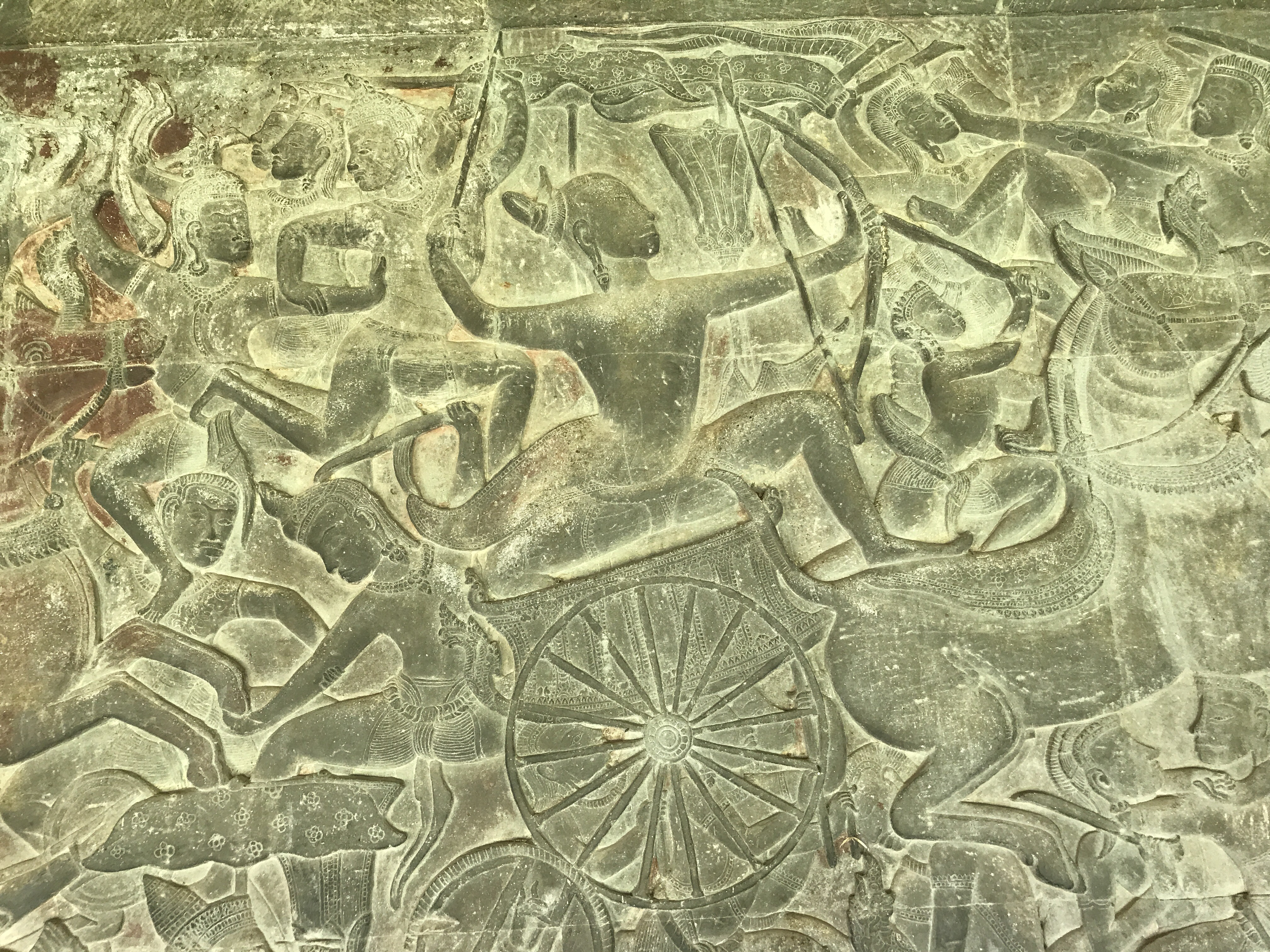
Bas relief of Drona, Angkor Wat

Drona had been the preceptor of most kings involved in the Kurukshetra War on both sides. Drona strongly condemned Duryodhana exiling the Pandavas, as well as the Kauravas' general abuse towards the Pandavas. But being a servant of Hastinapura, Drona was duty-bound to fight for the Kauravas, and thus against his favorite Pandavas. After the fall of Bhishma on the 10th day, he became the Chief Commander of the Kaurava army on the 11th day of war. Duryodhana manages to convince Drona to try to end the war by capturing Yudhishthira. Though he killed hundreds and thousands of Pandava troops, Drona failed to capture Yudhishthira on the 11th and 12th day of the war, as Arjuna was always there to repel his advances.

=== Abhimanyu's killing ===
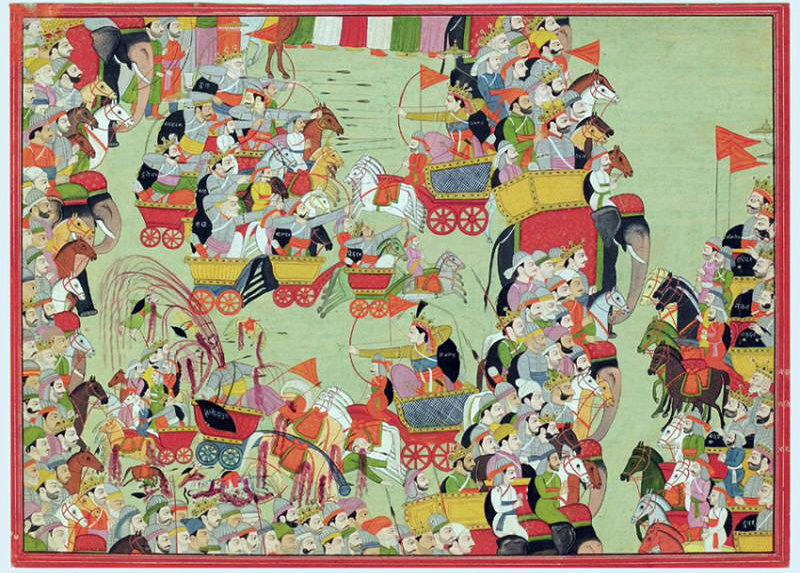
The Pandavas' Abhimanyu battles the Kauravas and their allies.

On the 13th day of the war, Drona formed the Chakravyuha strategy to capture Yudhishtira, knowing that only Arjuna and Krishna would know how to penetrate it. The Trigartas were distracting Arjuna and Krishna into another part of the battlefield, allowing the main Kaurava army to surge through the Pandava ranks.

Unknown to many, Arjuna's young son Abhimanyu had the knowledge to penetrate the formation but did not know the way out. At the request of Yudhishthira, Abhimanyu agreed to lead the way for the Pandava army and was able to penetrate the formation. However, he was trapped when Jayadratha, the King of Sindhu, held the Pandava warriors who were following him, at bay. Abhimanyu did not know how to get out of the Chakravyuha, but embarked upon an all-out attack on the Kaurava army, killing tens of thousands of warriors single-handedly. Drona is impressed with Abhimanyu and praises him endlessly, earning the ire of Duryodhana. With his army facing decimation and spurred on by Duryodhana's criticisms, Drona asked the Kaurava warriors to simultaneously attack Abhimanyu, to strike down his horses and his charioteer and to disable his chariot from different angles. Left without support, Abhimanyu began fighting from the ground. Exhausted after his long and prodigious feats, Abhimanyu was eventually killed.

After that, several who fought against Abhimanyu were criticized for their murder, such as Bhurishrava, Drona and Karna.

=== Fourteenth day ===
The devious murder of his son enraged Arjuna, who swore to kill Jayadratha the next day or immolate himself. Drona constructed three combined vyuhas to protect Jayadratha, first was the Shakata vyuha then was Padma Vyuha and last was the Srigantaka vyuha and at its rear was Jayadratha and stood at the head of the box formation or Shakata vyuha

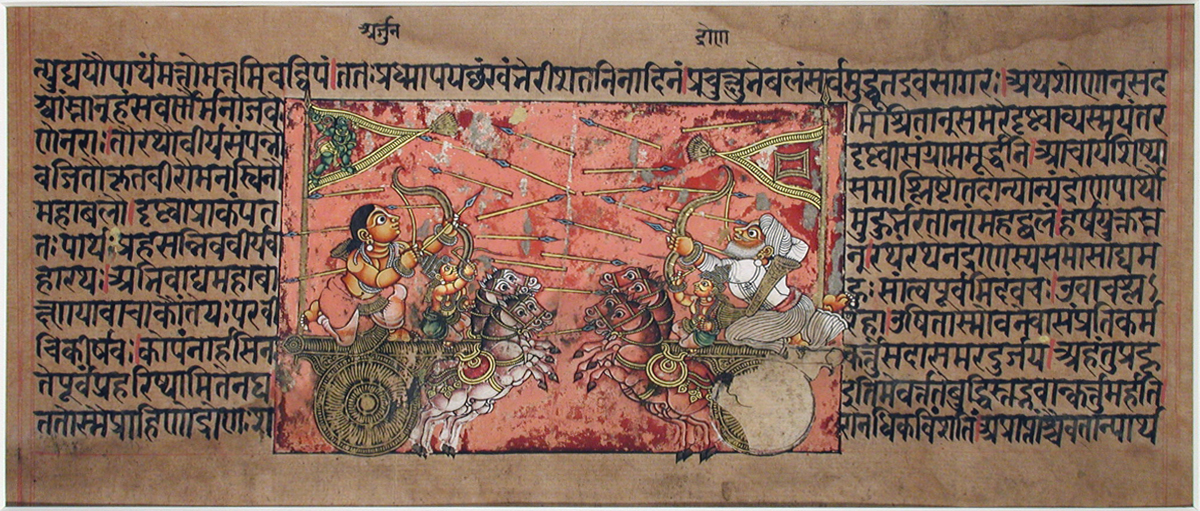
Drona battles his student, Arjuna.

In the early part of the day, Arjuna and he duel, and Arjuna is unable to bypass his preceptor. With Krishna's prodding, Arjuna circumvents Drona. When Duryodhana rages at Drona, Drona replies and that he intends to capture Yudhishthira while Arjuna is away and would only hasten their victory. In a notable battle, Drona attempts to capture Yudhishthira but is stopped by Dhristadyumna. Drona severely wounds his friend's son, disarming him and forcing him to retreat. When he attempts to chase after Dhristadyumna, he is checked by Satyaki, who insults his teacher's teacher and issues a challenge. Their combat is described as fierce and despite being able to hold off Drona for several hours, Satyaki eventually tires and has to be rescued by the Upapandavas.

Later in the day, Yudhishthira sends Satyaki to aid Arjuna. When Satyaki comes upon Drona, he circumvents him, saying he must follow in his teacher's footsteps. When Yudhishthira later sends Bhima, Drona recounts what happened with Arjuna and Satyaki, and hence makes sure he does not allow Bhima also to circumvent him. Angrily rebuking him, Bhima shatters Drona's chariot with his mace. Drona takes up another chariot, only for Bhima to smash that one as well. In total, Bhima smashes eight of Drona's chariots and is able to bypass his guru.

== Death ==
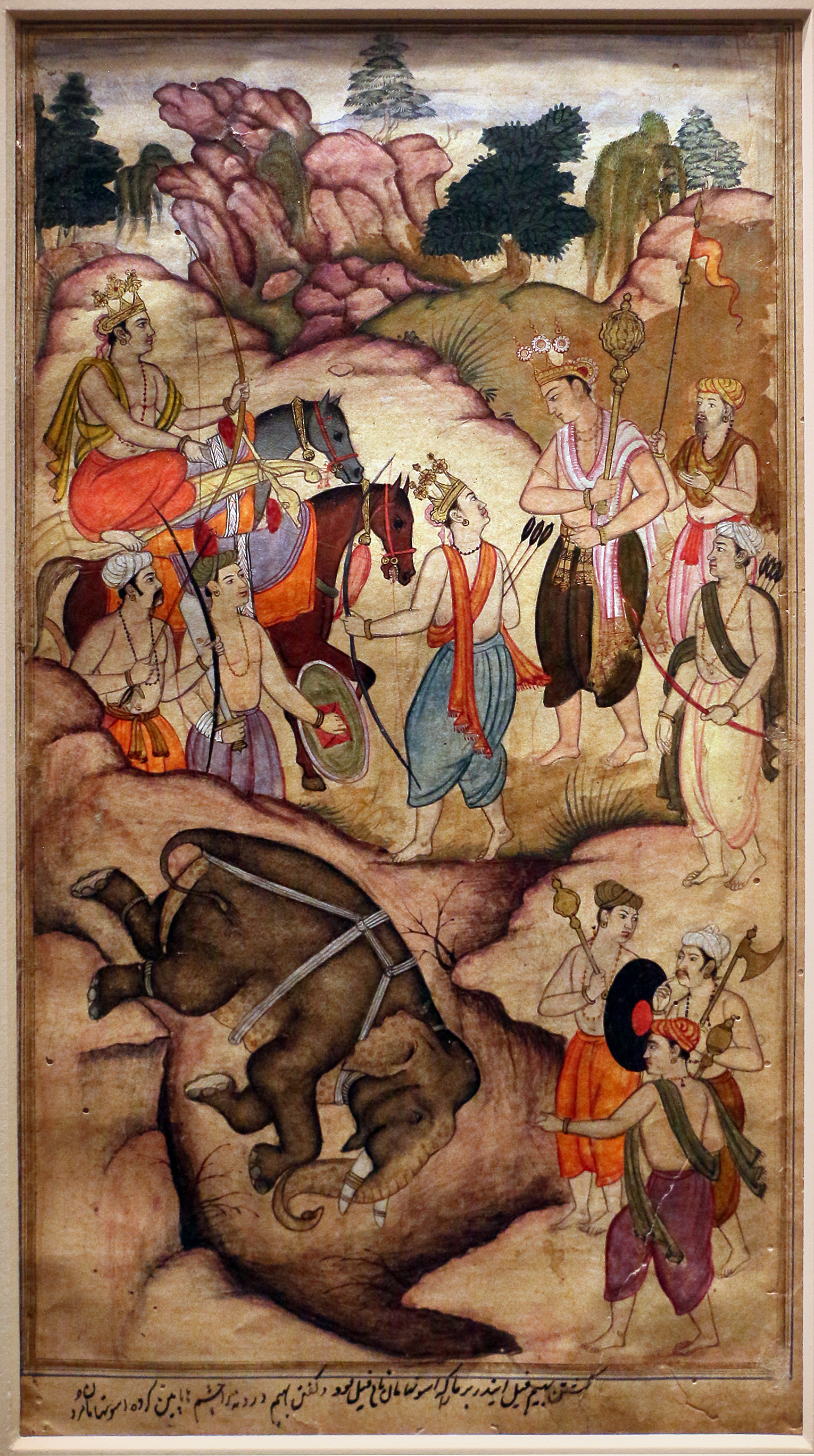
Bhima kills an elephant named Asvatthama, by artist Sadiq from Razmnama

On the 14th night of the Mahabharata war, Drona is instigated by Duryodhana's remarks of being a traitor as he was not able to protect Jayadratha. Sensing his end is near, he used the Brahmastra against the common Pandava soldiers. At that moment, all the Saptarshi appeared on the sky and requested Drona to retract this ultimate weapon used on ordinary soldiers. Drona obeyed, retracting the weapon. The rishis continue and berate Drona for violating the rules of war, criticizing him for using divine weapons so indiscriminately.

On the 15th day, Drona kills many Pandava soldiers, including Virata in arrow-play and Drupada in a sword fight. Lamenting the deterioration of their friendship, Drona pays his respect to Drupada's corpse. Drona and his son Ashwatthama unleashed havoc upon the entire Pandava army that day.

Knowing it would be impossible to defeat an armed Drona that day since Arjuna refuses to kill his guru, Krishna suggests a plan to disarm Drona by some means of contrivance. Bhima would then proceed to kill an elephant named Ashwatthama, and then claim to Drona that he has killed his son. Disbelieving his claim, Drona approached Yudhishthira, knowing of Yudhishthira's firm adherence to Dharma and honesty. When Drona asked for the truth, Yudhishthira responded with "Ashwatthama is dead, the elephant." Adding the word elephant indistinctly so that Drona could not hear it.

Then Drona descended from his chariot, laid down his arms and sat on the ground in meditation to find his son's soul. Pandavas wanted to use this opportunity to arrest him, but enraged by the death of his father and several Panchala warriors, Dhrishtadyumna took this opportunity and beheads him, in a gross violation of the rules of war. Arjuna would condemn Dhrishtadyumna for this act.

== Analysis and modern assessment ==
Drona was somewhat parallel to Bhishma both in martial powers, and, compelled by the refuge King Dhritarashtra had given him, in his unwavering commitment to fighting for Hastinapura irrespective of who the ruler was and whether or not the cause was just. Drona is often accused of dragging the Kuru dynasty into his own personal conflicts when he demanded his pupils to capture Drupada. This action would ultimately lead the Kingdom of Panchala developing hostile relations with Hastinapura. Drona was also notably silent during Draupadi's disrobing as he was afraid of antagonizing the Kauravas.

Drona was criticized for many of his actions during the war:

- First, as a Brahmin, and secondly, as the princes' teacher, he should have removed himself from the battlefield.
- Drona used the Brahmastra, celestial powerful weapons against the Pandava's common foot-soldiers. This was looked down upon as it improper to use such weapons against those who are unacquainted with its use.

Drona's overarching actions during the war are portrayed differently. When he became commander-in-chief, the rules of war were averted. Divine weapons were used against ordinary soldiers, war continued throughout the night, warriors no longer engaged each other one-on-one, etc. Specifically, he was willing to try to end the war by capturing Yudhishthira, while Karna was not, as he considered it lacking honor. In other versions, Drona's differences in strategy are shown as a difference in philosophy- Drona believed, that as the commander-in-chief of the Kaurava army, his goal was to ensure the protection of his soldiers through any means necessary.

== In popular culture ==
The acharya remains a revered figure in Hindu history, and a pillar of the Indian tradition of respecting one's teacher as an equal not only of parents, but even of God. The Government of India annually awards the Dronacharya Award for excellence in sports tutelage to the best sports teachers and coaches in India.

It is believed that the city of Gurgaon (lit. 'Village of the Guru') was founded as "Guru Gram" by Dronacharya on land given to him by Dhritarashtra, the king of Hastinapura in recognition of his teachings of martial arts to the princes, and the 'Dronacharya Tank', still exists within the Gurgaon city, along with a village called Gurgaon. Indian Government (Haryana), on 12 April 2016 decided to reinstate and change the name of Gurgaon to Gurugram.

== See also ==
- Hindu mythology
- Hinduism
- Wars of Hindu Mythology
- Historicity of the Mahabharata

== Sources ==
- Chakravarti, Bishnupada (13 November 2007). Penguin Companion to the Mahabharata. Penguin UK. ISBN 978-93-5214-170-8.
- The Story of Drona - the Teacher of Kauravas and Pandavas
- Supereme Court of India on Dronacharya: http://articles.timesofindia.indiatimes.com/2011-01-06/india/28378711_1_tribals-sc-bench-dronacharya
