= Duhshala =

Princess in the epic Mahabharata

- Mahabharata character
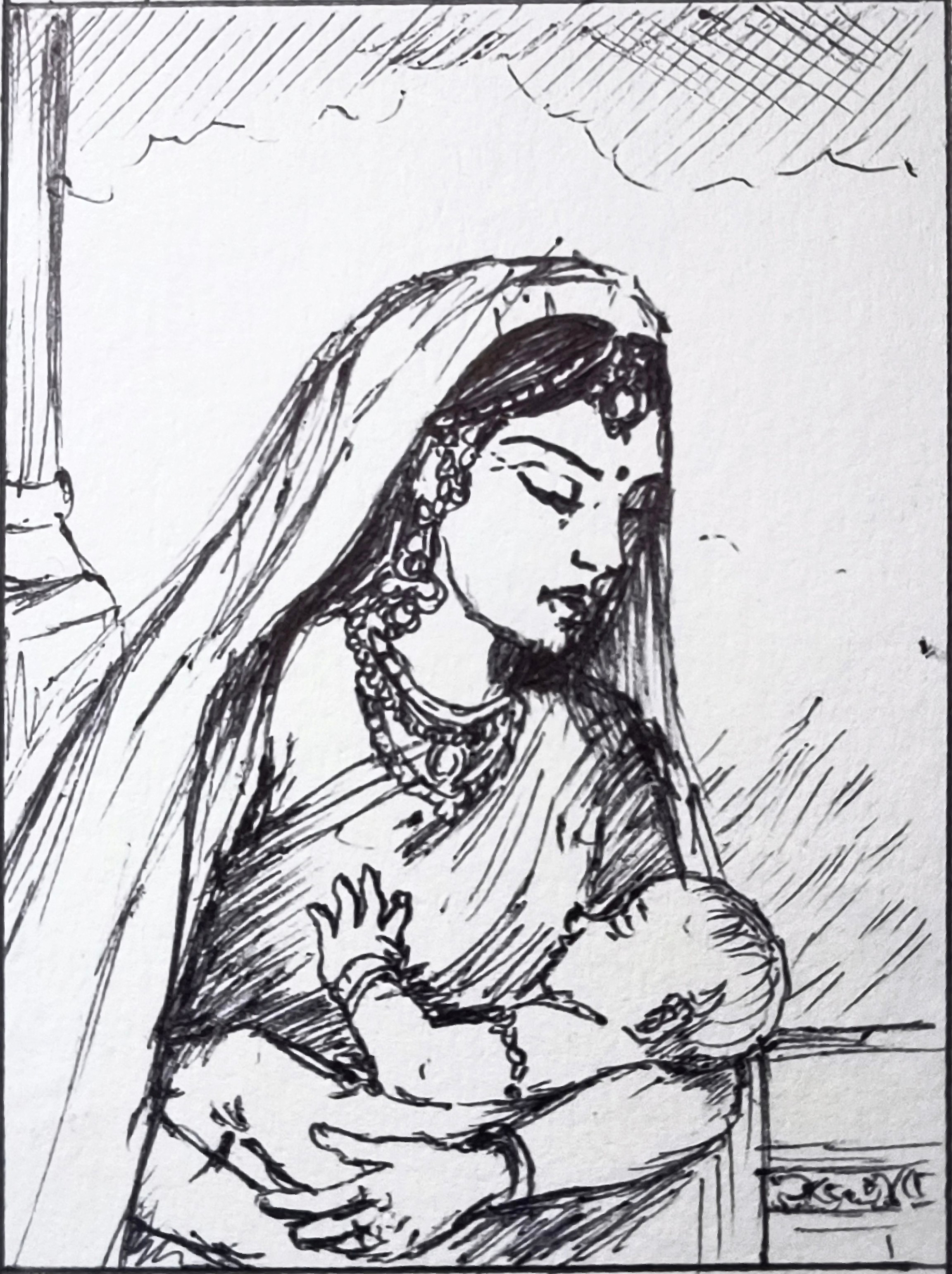
- An illustration of Dushala carrying her grandson

Information
- Position: Princess of Kuru Kingdom; Queen-mother of Sindhu Kingdom
- Family: Gandhari (mother); Dhritarashtra (father); 100 Kauravas including; Duryodhana; Dushasana; Vikarna (brothers); Yuyutsu (half-brother); Unnamed grandson
- Spouse: Jayadratha
- Children: Suratha (son)
- Origin: Kuru Kingdom
- Dynasty: Chandravamsha

Duhshala (Sanskrit: दुःशला, romanized: Duḥśalā) or Dushshala (Sanskrit: दुश्शला, romanized: Duśśalā), also rendered as Dushala, is a minor character in the Hindu epic Mahabharata. She is the princess of Kuru kingdom, being the only daughter of King Dhritarashtra and Queen Gandhari as well as the only sister of the hundred Kaurava brothers and cousin-sister of the five Pandava brothers. She is married to Jayadratha, the king of Sindhu kingdom, and is the mother of his heir Suratha. Her marriage links the Kuru and Sindhu royal houses, but also draws her into the consequences of the Kuru–Pandava conflict. When Jayadratha attempts to abduct Draupadi, the Pandavas spare his life out of consideration for Dushshala, preventing her from becoming a widow. After the Kurukshetra war, Dushshala is widowed but continues to live as the queen mother of Sindhu. During Pandavas's Ashvamedha campaign, she approaches Arjuna with her young grandson and asks him to spare the boy, who is also his relative. Arjuna agrees, and Dushshala's grandson is later made king of Sindhu.

== Biography ==
According to the Adi Parva of the Mahabharata, Gandhari, wife of Kuru king Dhritarashtra, received a boon from the sage Vyasa assuring her of a hundred sons. When she subsequently produced a single ball of flesh, Vyasa divided it into one hundred portions, each of which was placed in a vessel of clarified butter to develop into a son. During the process of division, Gandhari expressed a wish for a daughter in addition to the promised sons, motivated by the traditional belief that a daughter’s sons confer spiritual benefits upon the maternal grandparents and by the social value placed on the relationship with a son-in-law. Vyasa identified one remaining portion of the flesh beyond the hundred allotted for the sons and stated that this excess fragment would develop into a daughter. The portion was placed in a separate vessel of clarified butter. From this fragment Duhshala was born.

Duhshala is raised in the royal palace of Hastinapura, along with her 100 brothers—the Kauravas—and later her five cousins—the Pandavas. Duhshala is wedded to Jayadratha, the King of Sindhu Kingdom, by the Kuru elders. The Sabha Parva mentions that Duhshala led her sisters-in-law (the wives of the Kauravas) when they visited the palace of Pandavas in Indraprastha and met Draupadi, the wife of the Pandavas.

The Vana Parva mentions that after Jayadratha's failed attempt to abduct Draupadi when the Pandavas were exiled in forest, several of the Pandavas wished to kill him. However, at the eldest Pandava—Yudhishthira’s request, made in order to spare Duhshala the fate of widowhood, they refrained from killing him and instead shaved his head as a mark of humiliation before releasing him. During the Kurukshetra War, Jayadratha took a leading part in the killing of Abhimanyu, son of Arjuna, an act motivated in part by the earlier humiliation. On the following day Arjuna, aided by Krishna, fulfilled a vow to kill Jayadratha before sunset and beheaded him.

In the Stri Parva (Book 11), Gandhari, while surveying the battlefield with Krishna, describes the death of her son-in-law Jayadratha and the grief of her daughter Duhshala. She recalls Jayadratha's earlier sparing in the forest considering Duhshala and questions why the same regard was not shown again when Arjuna killed Jayadratha. Duhshala is portrayed as a young widow overwhelmed by sorrow: striking her own body, censuring the Pandavas, and running frantically across the field in search of her husband’s severed head. The passage also notes that Duhshala had co-wives—including those from Kamboja and Yavana backgrounds—who sit around their husband's body, attempting to protect it from scavengers.

Years later, during Arjuna’s ashvamedha tour after the Kurukshetra War, narrated in the Ashvamedhika Parva (14th book), Duhshala reappears as the widowed queen mother of the Sindhus. During Arjuna’s encounter with the remaining Saindhava forces, she intervenes after Arjuna has already killed many of them and has temporarily collapsed under inauspicious omens. Accompanied by her young grandson, Duhshala informs Arjuna that her son Suratha has died of grief upon learning that his father’s killer was approaching. She appeals for mercy on behalf of the boy, stressing that the child is a relative of Arjuna, desires peace, and deserves to be spared. Arjuna relents. Later, Duhshala attends the Ashvamedha ceremony itself in Hastinapura, where Yudhishthira arranges for Duhshala’s grandson to be anointed as ruler of Jayadratha’s former kingdom so that Jayadratha’s line may continue.

== In derivative literature ==
In post-epic Sanskrit drama, Duhshala is given an expanded and morally elevated portrayal. She appears in Dutaghatotkacha by Bhasa (c. 2nd century CE – the 4th century CE) and although her role is brief, Bhasa’s depiction of her as a deeply appealing figure who embodies noble royal virtues. She is mentioned alongside her parents when the messenger delivers the news of Pandava warrior Abhimanyu’s death in the Kurukshetra War. Upon discovering that her husband Jayadratha killed Abhimanyu through deceit, she reacts with righteous indignation and misery over her husband's actions. She holds the view that the man who widowed Uttarā has effectively invited the same fate upon his own wife. In her fear and distress for Jayadratha's life, she offers to go directly to Uttarā to console her, declaring that she will soon share her fate and adopt the widow's garments alongside her. The authors note that this exchange provides insight into the social conditions of Bhāsa’s era, where widows wore specific attire and led lives of chastity and self-surrender. Furthermore, scholar Ratnamayidevi Dikshit views Duhshala’s conduct, speech, and movements as clear demonstrations of her high birth. She is described as possessing the same foresight, discretion, and understanding as her mother, Gandhari. Dikshit notes that Duhshala reflects the broader representation of Kaurava women in Bhāsa’s plays—brave, patient, spirited, and farsighted—serving as evidence that women of that era maintained their high, noble ground despite the moral deterioration present among the menfolk.

Duhshala also appears in Bhatta Narayana's play Venisamhara (c. 11th century CE). In Act II of Venisamhara, she, alongside her mother-in-law (Sindhurāja-mātā), enter in a state of extreme panic and sorrow to meet Duryodhana. They brings the alarming news that Arjuna, consumed by rage over the death of his young son Abhimanyu, has sworn a solemn vow (pratijna) to kill Jayadratha before sunset, failing which he will self-immolate. Dikshit notes that, unlike her previous portrayal in Bhasa’s works, Duhshala here merely weeps and is given no dialogue, with Jayadratha’s mother speaking instead. Teh scholar theorises that this may reflect the social norms of Bhatta Narayana’s own time, when younger women might not have been granted the privilege of speaking in the presence of elders.
