= Gāndhārī Temple =

Hindu temple in India

The Gāndhārī temple is a temple in Hebbya (or Hebbaya or Hebbya) village, Nanjangud, Mysore, India. The temple is dedicated to Gandhari, mother of the Kauravas, in the Mahabharatha. The foundation stone of the temple was laid on June 19, 2008. It was expected to cost Rs 2.5 crore (INR 25 million).
