= Gandhari =

Queen and mother of the Kauravas in the epic Mahabharata

- Mahabharata character
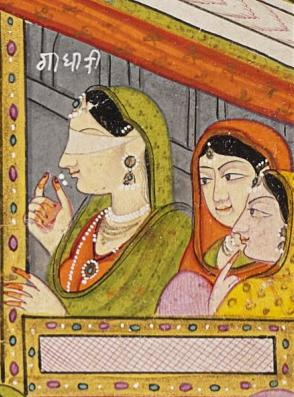
- Pahari painting of Gandhari with maid-servants, by Purkhu, c. 1820 CE

Information
- Position: Queen of Kuru Kingdom
- Family: Subala (father); Shakuni, Ashvaketu, Achala, Gaja, and various other brothers
- Spouse: Dhritarashtra
- Children: 100 Kauravas including; Duryodhana; Duhshasana; Vikarna (sons); Duhshala (daughter); Yuyutsu (step son)
- Origin: Gandhara Kingdom

Gandhari (Sanskrit: गान्धारी, lit. 'of Gandhara', IAST: Gāndhārī) is a major character in the ancient Hindu epic Mahabharata. She is introduced as a princess of the Gandhara Kingdom and later becomes the queen of the Kuru Kingdom. The daughter of King Subala, her marriage is arranged with Dhritarashtra, the blind prince of Kuru, and in a symbolic gesture of solidarity, she voluntarily blindfolds herself for life. Through miraculous intervention, she becomes the mother of the one hundred sons collectively known as the Kauravas, the eldest of whom, Duryodhana, serves as one of the principal antagonists of the narrative.

Besides her hundred sons, Gandhari also has a daughter, Dushala. Her brother, Shakuni, becomes a central figure in aiding Duryodhana's schemes against his cousins, the Pandavas. An ardent devotee of the god Shiva, Gandhari is portrayed as a woman of great virtue and moral strength, who nonetheless struggles to dissuade her sons from their destructive path. She speaks out at pivotal moments in the narrative, including during the humiliation of Draupadi and peace talks before the Kurukshetra War. Despite condemning the actions of Duryodhana, the longstanding rivalry between the Kauravas and the Pandavas ultimately leads to the catastrophic Kurukshetra War, where all of Gandhari's sons perish.

After the war, she becomes the voice of women who suffer due to the devastation caused by the conflict. While she refrains from cursing the Pandavas, recognising the righteousness of their victory, her overwhelming grief drives her to curse Krishna, the Pandavas' counselor, whom she holds accountable for the war's devastation despite his divine ability to prevent it. She foretells the downfall of his Yadava dynasty. In the aftermath, Gandhari retires to the forest with other Kuru elders—Dhritarashtra, Vidura and Kunti—living her final days in austerity until she perishes in a forest fire.

Gandhari epitomizes the ideal of pativrata (devoted wife) in Hindu tradition, her intense asceticism believed to have granted her great spiritual power. Though initially a silent presence, she transforms into a powerful symbol of the anguish endured by women in times of war. Beyond the epic, she features in various adaptations and retellings.

== Epithets ==
In the Mahabharata, Gāndhārī is referred to by various names, including:

- Gāndhārarājaduhitā — 'daughter of the King of Gāndhāra'
- Saubaleyī, Subalajā, Subalāputrī, and Subalātmajā — 'daughter of Subala'

== Literary background ==
Gandhari is a character of the Mahabharata, one of the Sanskrit epics from the Indian subcontinent. The work is written in Classical Sanskrit and is a composite work of revisions, editing and interpolations over many centuries. The oldest parts in the surviving version of the text may date to near 400 BCE.

The Mahabharata manuscripts exist in numerous versions, wherein the specifics and details of major characters and episodes vary, often significantly. Except for the sections containing the Bhagavad Gita which is remarkably consistent between the numerous manuscripts, the rest of the epic exists in many versions. The differences between the Northern and Southern recensions are particularly significant, with the Southern manuscripts more profuse and longer. Scholars have attempted to construct a critical edition, relying mostly on a study of the "Bombay" edition, the "Poona" edition, the "Calcutta" edition and the "south Indian" editions of the manuscripts. The most accepted version is one prepared by scholars led by Vishnu Sukthankar at the Bhandarkar Oriental Research Institute, preserved at Kyoto University, Cambridge University and various Indian universities.

The Mahabharata centres on the intense rivalry between the groups of brothers—five Pandavas and the hundred Kauravas, culminating in the epic Kurukshetra War, which forms the narrative's core. A significant portion of the text is devoted to detailing the battles fought between the warriors of both sides during this conflict. The Mahabharata is structured into eighteen parvas or 'books', starting with the Adi Parva, in which Gandhari is introduced.

== Biography ==
Gandhari is introduced in the Adi Parva of the Mahabharata as the daughter of King Subala, the ruler of the Gandhara kingdom and a descendant of Turvasu (son of Yayati) of the Lunar Dynasty. This region spanned from the Sindhu River to Kabul in Afghanistan. Gandhari is regarded as an incarnation of a goddess named Mati ('intellect'). She had several brothers, but she shared a particularly close bond with Shakuni.

=== Early life and marriage ===
The Adi Parva describes Gandhari as a devout worshipper of the god Shiva from a young age. Pleased by her unwavering devotion, Shiva grants her a boon, promising that she will bear one hundred sons. After becoming aware of the divine boon bestowed upon Gandhari, Bhishma, the patriarch of the Kuru dynasty, proposes her marriage to Dhritarashtra, his eldest nephew who is born blind. Subala initially hesitates due to Dhritarashtra's blindness but later agrees to the marriage, prioritizing the prestige of an alliance with the Kuru dynasty. Gandhari's brother, Shakuni, accompanies her to the capital of Kuru Kingdom, Hastinapura, where the marriage is solemnized. On marrying Dhritarashtra, she blindfolds herself with a silk shawl, choosing to live without sight for the rest of her life. Gandhari is welcomed by the Kuru elders. Shakuni returns to his kingdom, but frequently visits Gandhari to help her and her children.

Gandhari's husband, Dhritarashtra, is denied the throne due to his blindness, despite being the eldest son. The throne is instead given to his younger brother, Pandu, but he later renounces the kingdom. As a result of these events, Dhritarashtra is crowned The King of the Kuru kingdom, and Gandhari becomes the queen.

=== Pregnancy and birth of her children ===
Gandhari's children were born in a miraculous manner. According to the Adi Parva, once when the sage Vyasa visits Hastinapura, Gandhari serves him with great respect and care. Impressed by her hospitality, Vyasa blesses her, reaffirming Shiva's boon. Shortly after, Gandhari conceives, but her pregnancy lasts two years without delivery. During this time, Kunti, the wife of Pandu, gives birth to her first son, Yudhishthira. Overwhelmed by frustration and envy upon hearing this, Gandhari strikes her womb, but instead of a child, a "hard mass of flesh" like an "iron ball" emerges from it. When the Kuru elders were about to discard the mass of flesh, Vyasa intervenes and instructs that the lump be divided into one hundred pieces and placed in jars of ghee for incubation. At Gandhari's request, an additional piece is prepared to produce a daughter, resulting in 101 jars. In due time, the jars yield one hundred sons collectively referred to as the Kauravas, and a daughter named Dushala. During Gandhari's prolonged pregnancy, Dhritarashtra had fathered another son, Yuyutsu, through a maidservant of Gandhari in fear of not having a child.

=== In Kuru court ===
An illustration from the Razmnama—the Persian translation of the Mahabharata depicting the Pandavas and Draupadi visiting Gandhari.

As the queen in the Kuru court, Gandhari witnesses many pivotal events leading to the Kurukshetra War, the central plot of the epic. She remains largely silent, like at the weapon display of her sons and the Pandavas. However, Gandhari exerts moral influence in critical moments. For instance, during the infamous dicing match narrated in the Sabha Parva, she intervenes after Draupadi's attempted disrobing, compelling Dhritarashtra to grant Draupadi a boon that ultimately secures the freedom of the Pandavas.

Gandhari attends the discussions and negotiations that preceded the war, hoping for peace, as mentioned in the Udyoga Parva. When Krishna, as Pandavas' envoy, urges peace, Dhritarashtra summons Gandhari, acknowledging her wisdom and foresight, and hopes she might persuade their son Duryodhana to abandon his destructive ambition. Gandhari criticizes Dhritarashtra for failing to curb their son's reckless ambitions and does not shy away from speaking against injustice. She delivers a stern appeal, condemning Duryodhana's pride, avarice, and defiance of elders. She stresses the dangers of wrath and the importance of self-control, urging him to listen to the counsel of respected elders like Bhishma and Drona and to make peace with the Pandavas. Gandhari warns that war will bring ruin to the Kuru dynasty and pleads for a just division of the kingdom, emphasizing that peace and shared rule are preferable to a devastating conflict. Despite her plea, Duryodhana remains unmoved, setting the stage for the catastrophic war to follow.

=== Kurukshetra war ===
During the war itself, Gandhari remains within the Kaurava palace, listening to Sanjaya's divinely aided narration of battlefield events. Vyasa had offered Dhritarashtra the divine eye to witness the war, but the king declined, choosing instead to rely on Sanjaya's oral account—a decision that positions Gandhari and the women of the palace as integral listeners to the epic's unfolding tragedy. Throughout Bhishma Parva to Shalya Parva, the text notes Gandhari's presence among the royal women who responded with visible grief to Sanjaya's accounts of key deaths: Drona, Karna, and finally Duryodhana. All of Gandhari's sons are killed in the war, specifically at the hands of the second Pandava, Bhima.

=== Post-war lamentation ===
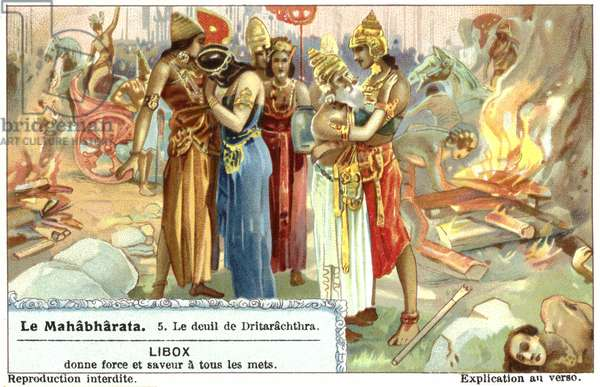
The mourning at Kurukshetra battlefield after the war

Gandhari assumes the central role in the Stri Parva, the eleventh book of the epic, which portrays the aftermath of the Kurukshetra War. After winning the war, the Pandavas visit Gandhari to seek her blessings. By this time, Gandhari has lost all her sons, including Duryodhana, and is overwhelmed with grief and anger. Gandhari contemplates cursing Yudhishthira. Vyasa intervenes to prevent this, reminding her of her earlier declaration that righteousness would prevail in the war. Gandhari accepts this truth and acknowledges that the destruction of her sons and the Kuru dynasty is the result of the misdeeds of Duryodhana, Shakuni, Karna, and Dushasana. Calming herself, she refrains from cursing the Pandavas. During this encounter, Bhima admits to fighting unfairly against Duryodhana, defending his actions as necessary in war. However, he lies to Gandhari about drinking the blood of Dushasana after killing him. In a moment of supplication, Yudhishthira bows to Gandhari and touched her feet. From beneath her blindfold, some of the energy from her anguished, downward gaze escapes, turning Yudhishthira's big toe permanently blue. The Pandavas are also reunited with their mother, Kunti, for the first time in over thirteen years. Kunti introduces a devastated Draupadi—who has also lost all her sons—to Gandhari and Gandhari consoles her.

Just before the war, Gandhari gained divine sight. With this 'divine eye', she surveys the battlefield from a distance and later visits the battlefield of Kurukshetra, accompanied by other family members. Gandhari emerges as a central voice among the bereaved women, expressing her sorrow and outrage over the destruction wrought by the war. There, Gandhari delivers a lament upon witnessing the devastated field strewn with the bodies of her sons and many other warriors. Upon witnessing Duryodhana's corpse, she momentarily faints. Standing beside Krishna, she describes the anguish of the bereaved women from both sides as they mourn their fallen kin, expressing profound sorrow over the ruinous consequences of the conflict. Seeing the vast destruction and death, Gandhari condemns Krishna, holding him responsible for the devastation. Though aware of his divine status—having been present when Sanjaya revealed Krishna's nature and when Krishna manifested his cosmic form—she accuses him of failing to prevent the war despite his divine powers. In a moment of profound emotional anguish, she curses Krishna, foretelling that thirty-six years from then, he will witness the destruction of his Yadava dynasty and die a lonely death, killed by trickery. Krishna accepts this curse, asserting that only he can bring about his end, but also admonishes Gandhari for shifting blame away from herself.

=== Later life and death ===
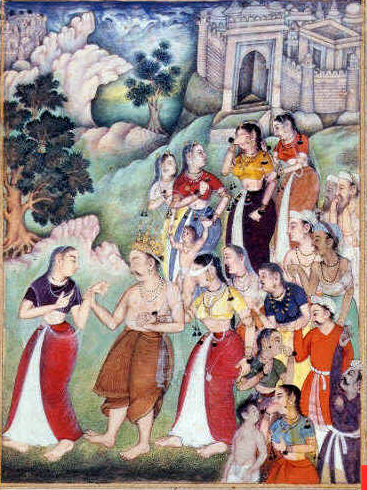
Kunti leading Dhritarashtra and Gandhari as they go to the forest—an illustration from the Razmnama

After Yudhishthira is crowned as the Emperor of Kuru, Gandhari continues to reside in Hastinapur, cared for by the queens of the Pandavas. The Ashramavasika Parva recounts that fifteen years after the war, Gandhari, along with Dhritarashtra, Kunti, her brother-in-law Vidura, and aid Sanjaya, retires to the forest near the ashram of Shatayupa, on the banks of the Ganga. The Pandavas, deeply affected by the separation, visit them after six years. At Gandhari and Kunti's request, Vyasa uses his yogic powers to enable them to briefly see the spirits of their deceased relatives. Shortly afterward, a wildfire engulfs the forest, consuming Dhritarashtra, Gandhari, and Kunti.

The Svargarohana Parva mentions that Yudhishthira performs the final rites for those who perish in the forest fire. After their deaths, the souls of Dhritarashtra and Gandhari ascend to Kuberaloka, the celestial realm associated with wealth and contentment.

== Assessment and legacy ==
Gandhari is identified as a quintessential exemplar of pativrata—the ideal of a devoted wife—in Hindu tradition. Scholar Arti Dhand argues that her exceptional spiritual powers stem from this commitment, as scriptures emphasize pativrata-dharma as a form of discipline akin to asceticism, and thus, believed to yield similar spiritual rewards, such as being able to curse Krishna himself.

Brian Black emphasizes Gandhari's narrative and interpretive authority within the Mahabharata, portraying her as a moral critic of the war whose presence as a listener to Sanjaya's war accounts establishes her as a witness to its devastating consequences. While often silent, Gandhari intervenes at key moments—such as criticizing Dhritarashtra, attempting to dissuade Duryodhana from war, and helping secure Draupadi's release—demonstrating subtle but effective agency. Her role culminates in the Stri Parva, where, granted divine vision, she becomes the primary speaker in a dialogue with Krishna. Here, Black argues, Gandhari transforms from a passive listener into a voice for collective female suffering, articulating the pain of the widows and the consequences of war with prophetic gravitas. Her condemnation of Krishna and the subsequent curse she places on him, which is later fulfilled, underscores her elevated moral and spiritual status. Black highlights that Gandhari's narration stands in parallel to Sanjaya's, but her position as a grieving mother and ascetic lends her speech a deeper emotional and theological resonance.

According to scholar James L. Fitzgerald, who translated The Book of the Women (Stri Parva), Gandhari is a poetic creation of Vyasa, representing an ideal of unwavering devotion, distinct from other women like Draupadi. Unlike Draupadi, who is drawn into conflicts between men, Gandhari exemplifies the faithful and ascetic wife, akin to Sita from the Ramayana. Her self-imposed suffering and ascetic dedication (ugra tapas) accumulate spiritual power over time, giving her a formidable presence in the epic. Despite her anger, notes Fitzgerald, Gandhari consoles the Pandavas, shifting from rage to compassion. She empathises deeply with Draupadi, who has also lost her sons, and their shared grief, mediated by Kunti, reflects the immense emotional toll of the war on women. Gandhari's lament—"It was my wrong that brought this eminent family to extinction"—reveals her sense of moral responsibility for the Kuru tragedy. Fitzgerald also examines Gandhari's sudden acquisition of divya chakshus (divine vision), which Vyasa grants, enabling her to see the battlefield and mourn the fallen warriors. This vision, Fitzgerald suggests, is rooted in her asceticism, raising questions about whether Vyasa's intervention diminishes her autonomous power. He posits that the epic's attribution of her clairvoyance to Vyasa may reflect the discomfort of the Brahminical tradition with the spiritual power of non-Brahmins, especially women.

In Hebbya village, Nanjangud, Mysore, India, there is a temple called Gāndhārī temple dedicated to her. This temple honours her devotion and loyalty as she epitomized the goodness of a mother and a loving wife.

== In Premodern Literature ==
One widely circulated narrative in various retellings portrays Gandhari making a single deliberate exception to her lifelong blindfolded state, underscoring the enduring love of mothers for their children, regardless of their moral failings. According to this version, during the final days of the Kurukshetra War, she visits the Kaurava camp and asks Duryodhana to present himself before her without clothing. Her intention is to remove her blindfold and direct the immense yogic power she had accumulated through years of austerity and devotion into his body through a single, potent gaze, thereby rendering him invulnerable—his body becoming as hard as a vajra (thunderbolt). However, Krishna, aware of Gandhari's intent, secretly advises Duryodhana to maintain modesty and cover his loins before meeting his mother. Obeying Krishna, Duryodhana drapes a cloth over his loin, leaving that part of his body unexposed to Gandhari's gaze. As a result, while the rest of his body becomes impenetrable, his thighs remain vulnerable, later resulting in his defeat and death. While this version of the story has gained popularity in modern media adaptations and oral traditions, it does not appear in the original Sanskrit Mahabharata, where Bhima is compelled to strike Duryodhana's thighs—a move considered illegal in mace combat—to ensure victory and fulfill his earlier vows.

Urubhanga by Bhāsa (c. 1st - 2nd century CE) is one of the earliest attempts to evoke karuna rasa (pathos) for Duryodhana, and as part of this transformation, Bhāsa expands the relationship between Duryodhana and Gandhari. Here, Gandhari and other family members of Duryodhana are depicted visiting the battles while he is dying. For Gandhari, Duryodhana symbolises all her hundred sons and stands as the "golden pillar" of her sacrificial world, conveying that his downfall plunges her into symbolic darkness. Even in death, the maternal bond persists; Duryodhana requests that Gandhari be his mother again in the next life, to which she responds with affection, affirming that he had spoken the very desire of her heart.

In Jain retellings of the Mahabharata, a narrative emerges concerning Gandhari's early life and marriage, which, though absent from the canonical Sanskrit epic, provides a background that facilitates the later victimization and justification of the antagonist Shakuni. When astrologers predicts a brief lifespan for her future husband, Subala, to avert this, arranges a symbolic marriage between Gandhari and a goat prior to her wedding with Dhritarashtra, after which the goat is sacrificed. When Bhishma later learns of this ritual, he condemns the act, considering Gandhari a symbolic widow, and takes punitive measures against Subala's family. He starves all the men of Gandhari's family until only one—Shakuni—survives. In a different variant, Gandhari is taken captive as a bride and her family is punished when they refuse her marriage to the blind Dhritarashtra.

== In Modern Literature ==
In the modern period, Rabindranath Tagore wrote a Bengali poetic play about her, named Gandharir Abedon (Bangla: গান্ধারীর আবেদন, Translation: Supplication of Gandhari). Gandhari, her husband Dhritarashtra and their son Duryodhana are central characters in the play.

In the 21st century, Aditi Banerjee wrote a novel named The Curse of Gandhari, which depicts the story of the Mahabharata through the perspective of Gandhari.
