= Duryodhana =

Eldest Kaurava in the epic Mahabharata

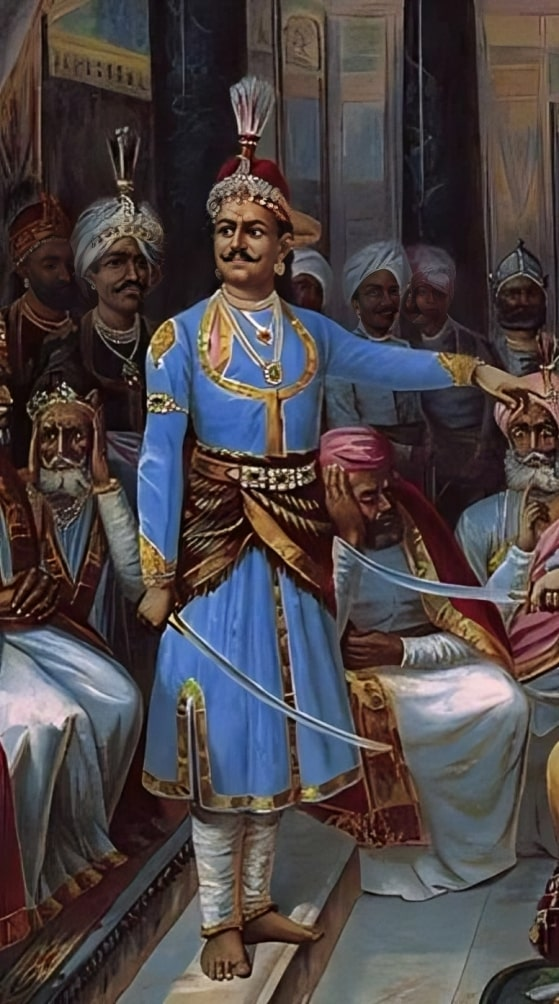
- Duryodhana in the Kuru Court insulting Krishna before the Kurukshetra War, painting by Raja Ravi Varma

Information
- Alias: Suyodhana
- Affiliation: Kaurava
- Weapon: Gada (mace)
- Family: Dhritarashtra (father); Gandhari (mother); Dushasana, Vikarna, and 97 more (younger brothers); Dushala (sister); Yuyutsu (half-brother)
- Spouses: Princess of Kalinga; Princess of Kashi
- Children: Lakshmana Kumara (son); Lakshmanaa (daughter, in Puranic scriptures)
- Relatives: Pandavas (paternal half cousins); Shakuni (maternal uncle); Pandu and Vidura (paternal uncles)
- Home: Hastinapur, Kuru kingdom

Duryodhana (Sanskrit: दुर्योधन, IAST: Duryodhana), also known as Suyodhana, is the primary antagonist of the Hindu epic Mahabharata. He is the eldest of the Kauravas, the hundred sons of King Dhritarashtra and Queen Gandhari of Kuru dynasty. Born through a miraculous manner, his birth is accompanied by ill-omens. Duryodhana grows up in Hastinapura and later becomes its crown prince. Driven by innate selfishness, jealousy, and hostility towards his cousins—the five Pandava brothers—Duryodhana frequently plots against them, aided by his principal allies: his trickster uncle Shakuni, his loyal friend Karna, his devoted brother Dushasana and his blind and indulgent father Dhritarashtra.

Duryodhana's envy culminates in the infamous dice game, where he humiliates Draupadi, the queen of the Pandavas. This incident provokes Bhima, the second Pandava, to vow that he will one day smash Duryodhana's thigh. Later, with the help of Shakuni, Duryodhana tricks the Pandavas into relinquishing their kingdom and forces them into exile. Even after the Pandavas complete their thirteen-year exile, he refuses to restore their kingdom, directly triggering the outbreak of the Kurukshetra War.

During the war, Duryodhana is supported by renowned warriors such as Bhishma, Drona, Karna and Shalya. As the conflict reaches its climax and most of his key supporters have fallen, Duryodhana flees the battlefield and hides within a magically fortified lake. When the Pandavas discover him, he agrees to a final duel, selecting his main rival Bhima as his opponent. Although Duryodhana has superior skills, he is ultimately defeated when Bhima strikes him illegally on the thigh. Gravely wounded and humiliated, Duryodhana remains defiant to the end, appointing his friend Ashvatthaman as commander of the remaining Kaurava forces. Following a final act of vengeance orchestrated by Ashvatthaman, Duryodhana succumbs to his injuries.

Duryodhana is regarded as an incarnation of the personification of strife, Kali (distinct from the goddess Kali). He is noted for his bravery, ambition, martial skills and adherence to kshatriya dharma (the warrior's code); however, he is also portrayed in the epic as an arrogant and envious man of poor judgment, who refuses to acknowledge Krishna's divinity. Duryodhana has been prominently adapted in numerous derivative works, such as Urubhanga and Venisamhara, where his character is expanded and portrayed with elements of pathos and tragedy.

== Etymology and epithets ==
The name "Duryodhana" is derived from Sanskrit, combining the term "yodhana" (योधन), meaning "to fight" or "warrior", with the prefix "dur" (दुर्). The prefix dur- carry a pejorative sense, meaning “badly” or “difficult to-.” This leads to interpretations such as “one who fights badly” or “one who is difficult to fight.” However, dur- can also signify a formidable quality, making the meaning more complex. Conversely, Suyodhana serves as an alternate name, with su- as a laudatory prefix meaning “well” or “easy to-.” This allows for interpretations such as “one who fights well” or “one who is easy to fight.” Indologist Monier-Williams identifies Suyodhana as a euphemism for Duryodhana, meaning “fighting well.” However, as author David Gitomer notes, if the Pāṇḍavas used this name, they could be invoking its alternative sense of “easy to fight,” undermining its intended praise.

Gitomer further observes that in mediaeval adaptations such as the play Veṇīsaṃhāra, the Pāṇḍavas generally call him Suyodhana, whereas his kin and partisans refer to him as Duryodhana. This pattern appears in the Mahābhārata as well, though both sides occasionally use the opposing term. Such shifts suggest that speakers are deliberately evoking the secondary meaning of each name, highlighting the epic’s deep ambivalence toward Duryodhana’s character—acknowledging both his strengths and his moral ambiguity.

Duryodhana, like many prominent figures in the Mahābhārata, is known by several epithets that highlight his lineage, status, and qualities. Some of these epithets include:

- Ājamīḍha
- Bhārata
- Bhārataśārdūla
- Bhārataśreṣṭha
- Bhāratāgrya
- Bharatarṣabha
- Bhāratasattama
- Dhārtarāṣṭra
- Dhṛtarāṣṭraja
- Gāndhārīputra
- Kaurava
- Kauravanandanā
- Kauravendra
- Kauravya
- Kauraveya
- Kurukuladhāma
- Kurumukhya
- Kurunandana
- Kurupati
- Kurupravīra
- Kurupuṅgava
- Kurusattama
- Kururāja
- Kurusiṃha
- Kurūttama

== Literary Background ==
Duryodhana is a central character in the Mahābhārata. The Mahābhārata is one of the two major Sanskrit epics of ancient India, traditionally attributed to Vyasa. Comprising approximately 100,000 verses, it is the longest epic poem in world literature. The epic primarily deals with the succession conflict between the Pandavas and the Kauravas, whom Duryodhana leads, culminating in the great war of Kurukshetra.

The text has multiple recensions, broadly categorized into the Northern Recension and the Southern Recension. These versions differ in length, theological content, and certain narrative elements, with the Southern Recension often including additional devotional aspects.

To establish a standardized version, the Critical Edition (CE) was compiled at the Bhandarkar Oriental Research Institute, Pune, under the guidance of Vishnu S. Sukthankar. Completed in 1966, the CE collates nearly 1,259 manuscripts to reconstruct the core text while identifying later interpolations.

== Biography ==
=== Birth ===
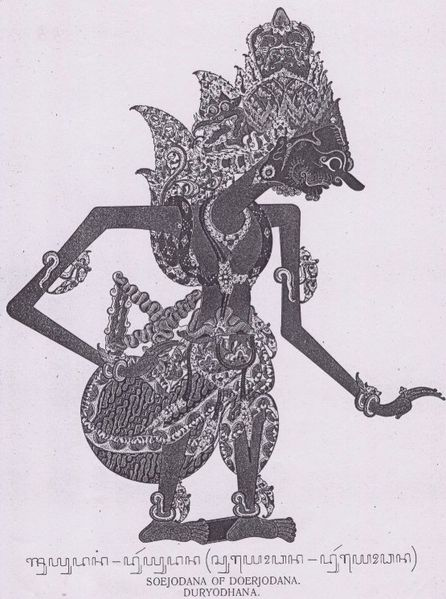
Duryodhana in Javanese Wayang

According to the Adi Parva, Duryodhana is born from a portion of Kali, the personification of strife. Duryodhana and his ninety-nine brothers are born through an extraordinary process. After being blessed by the sage Vyasa, Gandhari conceives but remains pregnant for two years without delivering. During this period, Yudhishthira, the eldest of the Pandavas and acknowledged son of Dhritarashtra's younger brother Pandu, is born. In distress and envy, Gandhari attempts to abort the foetus, resulting in the birth of a large mass of flesh. Vyasa instructs that the mass be divided into one hundred parts, each about the size of a thumb, and placed into pots filled with clarified butter. A smaller fragment is also preserved separately. After two years, from these pots, one hundred sons and a daughter, Dusshala, are born. Duryodhana emerges as the eldest among them.

The moment of Duryodhana's birth is accompanied by a series of evil omens. He cries with the voice of a donkey, prompting the donkeys in the royal stables to respond. Jackals howl, vultures and crows shriek, and fierce storms sweep across the land. Alarmed, Dhritarashtra consults his advisers, including Bhishma, Vidura, and scholars. After interpreting the signs, they warn that Duryodhana's birth will bring ruin to the kingdom and its people, and advise that he be abandoned. However, Dhritarashtra, overcome by paternal affection, refuses to follow their counsel, thereby setting the course for the eventual conflict of the Kurukshetra War.

=== Early years ===
Duryodhana grows up in the royal palace of Hastinapura as the eldest son of King Dhritarashtra and Queen Gandhari. After the death of Pandu, his surviving widow Kunti brings his five acknowledged sons, the Pandavas, to Hastinapura, where they are welcomed by Dhritarashtra. The young Kauravas and Pandavas live together, but frequent quarrels and rivalries soon emerge. Duryodhana is mentored by his maternal uncle, Shakuni.

Bhima, known for his immense strength, often bullies the Kauravas, tossing them about and subjecting them to various humiliations. This fosters deep resentment among the Kauravas, particularly in Duryodhana. Driven by hatred, Duryodhana attempts to poison Bhima during a water-sports outing by mixing deadly poison into his food. Bhima is thrown unconscious into the Ganga but survives after being rescued by the nagas, who neutralise the poison and bestow upon him great strength.

As the princes train under Dronacharya, tensions continue. Duryodhana proves to be extremely skilled with the mace and later goes to specialize in mace fighting under Balarama, becoming his favourite pupil. During a public exhibition, Bhima and Duryodhana clash fiercely, requiring intervention to stop them. Later during an archery contest in the same exhibition, when Karna’s lineage is questioned by the Pandavas, Duryodhana crowns him King of Anga to defend his honour and secure an important ally.

Duryodhana’s bitterness deepens when he fails to capture King Drupada of Panchala, a feat accomplished by Arjuna.

=== Usurping the Kingdom ===
Duryodhana arranges for the Pandavas to live in a palace made of lac at Varanavata, intending to burn them alive. However, the Pandavas escape through a secret tunnel. Believing the Pandavas to have perished in the fire at the palace of lac, Duryodhana and his brothers live in contentment at Hastinapura and even participates in the svayamvara of Panchala princess, Draupadi. However, their satisfaction turns to resentment when news arrives that the Pandavas, disguised as brahmins, have survived and won Draupadi at her svayamvara.

Following their marriage, the Pandavas remain at Drupada’s court, while the Kauravas return to Hastinapura. Duryodhana grows increasingly jealous of the Pandavas’ rising power and influence. Seeking once more to destroy them, Duryodhana proposes a plan to create divisions among the brothers through women. Karna, however, criticises the idea as impractical and suggests defeating Drupada to weaken the Pandavas. Ultimately, Bhishma and Drona advise reconciliation, proposing that the Pandavas be granted half the kingdom. Dhritarashtra accepts this counsel, and the Pandavas are invited back to Hastinapura.

The kingdom is divided, and the Pandavas establish their rule at Indraprastha. There, with the help of the architect Maya, they construct a magnificent palace. Yudhishthira performs the Rajasuya sacrifice, asserting his imperial status. Duryodhana attends the ceremony but is humiliated during a tour of the new palace, where he fall victim to visual illusions, mistaking floors for water and water for floors. Bhima openly mocks Duryodhana’s missteps, intensifying Duryodhana’s humiliation and deepening his hatred.

In popular culture, television shows and post-modern novels on Mahabharata attribute this blame to Draupadi with an added statement "the son of the blind man also is blind", but the scene in the canonical text is absent.

=== The game of dice ===
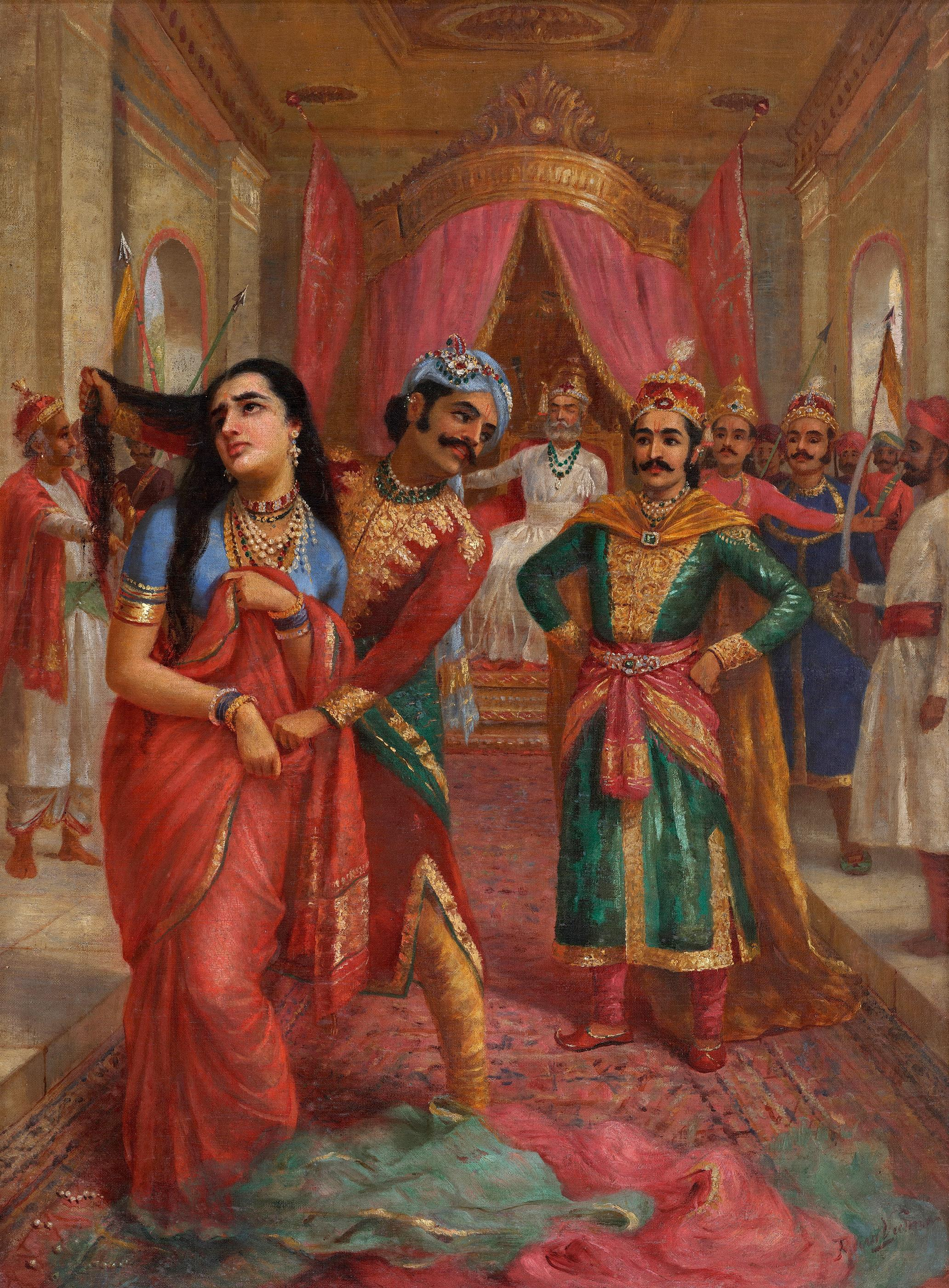
A painting by Raja Ravi Varma depicting the disrobing of Draupadi, with Duryodhana (in green) commanding Dushasana.

Following the humiliation he experiences at Indraprastha, Duryodhana becomes consumed by jealousy and hatred towards the Pandavas, turning weak. Resolving to destroy them, he conspires with Shakuni, an expert in dice, to challenge Yudhishthira to a gambling match. Despite warnings from Dhritarashtra and Vidura, Duryodhana persists, threatening to commit suicide, and Dhritarashtra reluctantly allows the game to proceed.

Shakuni, skilled in deceitful play, manipulates the game in Duryodhana’s favour. Yudhishthira, though unwilling, agrees to participate. At first, precious gems are wagered and lost, followed by gold coins, chariots, servants, horses, and weapons. Gradually, Yudhishthira loses all his material possessions. In desperation, he stakes his brothers one by one and loses them. Finally, he wagers himself and loses again.

Left with no alternative, Yudhishthira stakes Draupadi. Upon losing, Duryodhana sends his messenger Pratikami to summon her to the court, but she refuses to come. Duryodhana then orders his brother, Dushasana, who forcibly drags Draupadi by her hair into the royal assembly. There, she is publicly humiliated, and Duryodhana exposes his bare thigh (a euphemism for the genitals) and mockingly invites her to sit on it. Bhima, seething with rage, vows before all assembled to kill Duryodhana by breaking his thigh and to slay Dushasana. Lord Krishna comes and saves Draupadi. The Pandavas are thus released and return to Indraprastha.

However, Duryodhana, resentful of this outcome, conspires again with Shakuni to challenge Yudhishthira to a second game. This time, the stakes are harsher: the losers must spend twelve years in exile in the forest and a thirteenth year in concealment. If discovered during the final year, the exile must begin anew. Persuaded against his better judgment, Yudhishthira accepts and is defeated once more. The Pandavas prepare for exile, vowing vengeance. Bhima swears to kill Duryodhana and Dushasana, Arjuna vows to kill Karna, and Sahadeva promises to kill Shakuni.

=== During Pandava's exile ===
During the Pandavas’ exile, the sage Maitreya visits Hastinapura to counsel Dhritarashtra and Duryodhana. He urges them to recall the Pandavas from the forest and seek a peaceful resolution. However, Duryodhana dismisses the advice with arrogance, tapping his thigh and drawing on the ground with his foot in open disdain. Offended by this disrespect, Maitreya curses Duryodhana, prophesying that Bhima will one day break the same thigh Duryodhana had tapped in pride. Dhritarashtra pleads for forgiveness, and Maitreya declares that the curse may be averted only if Duryodhana pursues peace, otherwise the prophecy will inevitably come true.

Later, Duryodhana sets out on a pleasure expedition, the Ghosha Yatra, under the pretext of inspecting cattle. During this journey, he and his allies are captured by the Gandharvas, celestial beings, after Duryodhana abducts a few Gandharva women. The Pandavas, despite their ongoing enmity with Duryodhana, intervene and rescue him and his retinue. Humiliated by this incident, Duryodhana contemplates suicide and proposes that Dushasana be crowned king in his place, but Dushasana refuses.

Overcome by shame, Duryodhana lies on the ground intending to end his life. To prevent this, the anti-gods, danavas, perform a Vaitana Yajna in Patala (underworld realm) and summon a Rakshasi named Kritya, who transports Duryodhana to the netherworld. There, the danavas reveal that through their penance to Shiva, they have rendered Duryodhana’s body above the waist invulnerable, as hard as a diamond and impervious to weapons. Revived by this boon and reassured by the promise of allies such as Bhagadatta and Karna, Duryodhana regains his confidence and returns to Hastinapura, treating the entire experience as if it were a vivid dream.

Inspired by Yudhishthira’s Rajasuya sacrifice, Duryodhana aspires to perform a similar grand ritual. Advised by brahmins that he cannot undertake a Rajasuya while Dhritarashtra and Yudhishthira are still alive, he instead performs the Vishnu Yajna, an alternative ceremony of comparable prestige. Through this sacrifice, Duryodhana garners further recognition and support from monarchs aligned with the Kaurava cause

=== Virata battle ===
After twelve years in exile, the Pandavas begin their thirteenth year of incognito life at the court of King Virata in Matsya. Despite deploying spies across the kingdom, Duryodhana fails to locate the Pandavas during their year of concealment.

Toward the end of the incognito period, Susharman, King of Trigarta, informs Duryodhana that King Virata has grown weak after the general Kichaka’s death, suggesting it is an opportune moment to attack. Encouraged by Karna, Duryodhana mobilises the Kaurava army. As part of the plan, Susharman seizes the cattle of King Virata to provoke a confrontation. The incident occurs precisely as the Pandavas' period of concealment comes to an end. The young Virata prince, Uttara, ventures out to confront the raiders, with Arjuna, disguised as the eunuch Brihannala, acting as his charioteer. Upon seeing the might of the Kaurava forces, Uttara loses his nerve, and Arjuna retrieves his hidden bow, Gandiva. With his true identity revealed, Arjuna enters the battle and routs the Kaurava army.

With the successful defense of Virata’s kingdom, the Pandavas' period of exile and concealment officially ends. Duryodhana, realising that the Pandavas have fulfilled the conditions of their exile, grows increasingly anxious about the shifting balance of power.

=== Peace talks and buildup of war ===
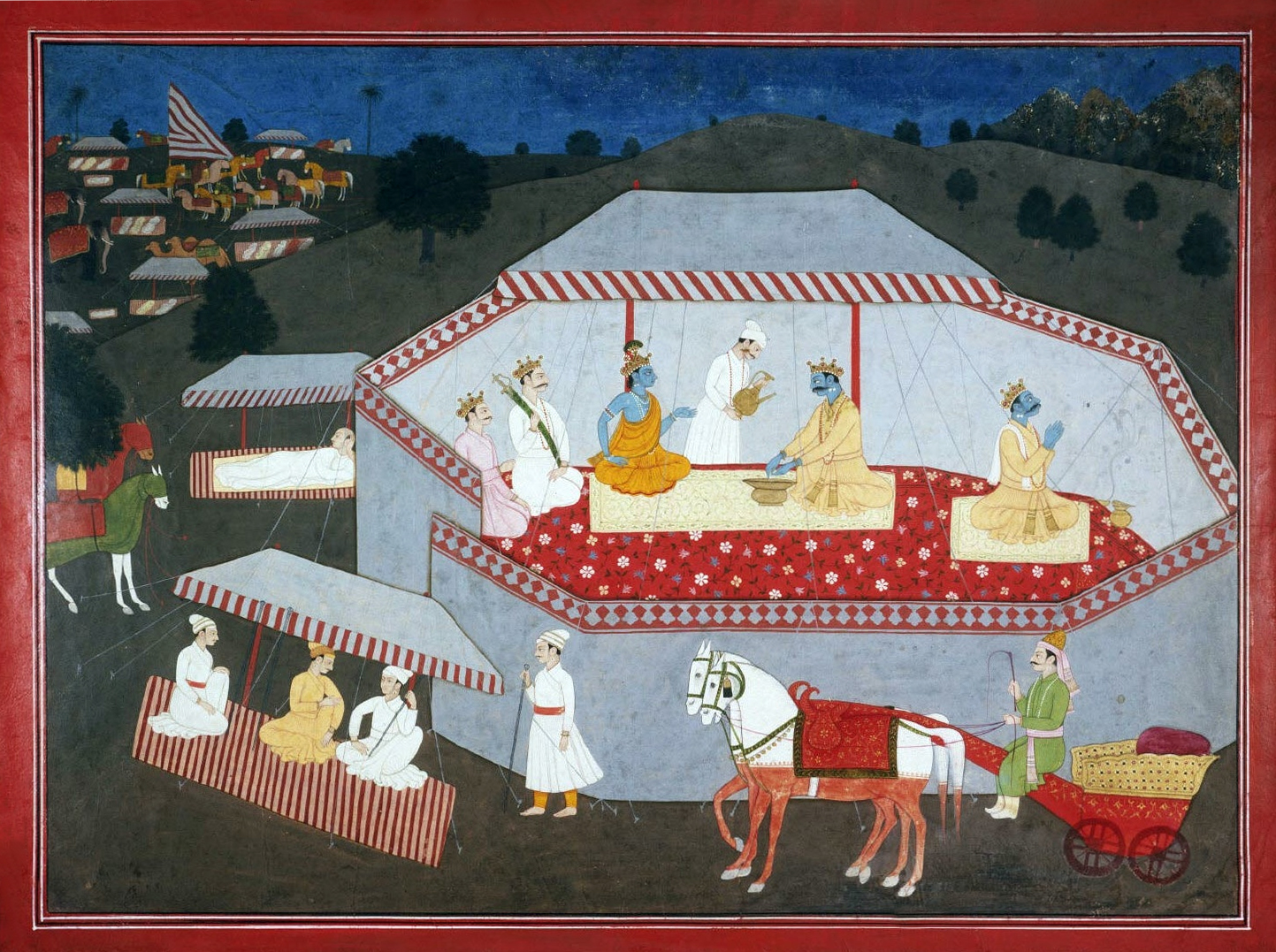
Duryodhana and Arjuna approach Krishna, Pahari miniature

After the Pandavas complete their twelve years of exile and one year of incognito life, they request the return of their share of the kingdom. Duryodhana refuses, leading to both sides to gather armies of an impending war.

Duryodhana moves quickly to gather allies. When he learns that Arjuna has gone to Dvaraka to seek the support of powerful leader of the Yadavas, Krishna, he rushes there as well. Krishna, pretending to be asleep, sees Arjuna first upon waking. Duryodhana and Arjuna both state their intentions, and Krishna offers a choice: one may have his vast Narayani army, while the other may have Krishna himself, unarmed and not participating in battle. Arjuna chooses Krishna, leaving Duryodhana satisfied to receive the powerful Narayani army. Duryodhana also approaches Balarama, who declines to take part in the war. Other than relatives, Duryodhana secures alliance with Kritavarma—belonging to Andhaka faction of Yadavas—and tricks Shalya, king of Madra and maternal uncle of Pandavas, into joining him. In total, Duryodhana assembles eleven akshauhinis.

Peace talks follow, with both factions sending envoys. During Krishna’s diplomatic visit, he proposes a settlement in which the Pandavas would accept just five villages. Duryodhana rejects the offer, declaring that he will not give them even as much land as could hold the tip of a needle. Krishna refuses Duryodhana’s hospitality and firmly sides with the Pandavas. In a final act of defiance, Duryodhana attempts to have Krishna taken captive, but the plan is opposed by others in the court and ultimately fails when Krishna reveals himself to be the Supreme God by showing his Vishvarupa form. Duryodhana refuses to acknowledge this despite persuasion from Dhritarashtra and other Kuru elders. Sage Kanva later advises Duryodhana to seek peace, but he ignores the counsel and proceeds with the war effort.

Duryodhana organises the Kaurava army by appointing veteran warriors including Bhishma, Drona, Kripa, Karna, Ashwatthama, Jayadratha, Hardika, Shakuni, Bahlika and Kamboja as commanders. Bhishma is made commander-in-chief, and Dushasana is appointed as his personal bodyguard. Uluka—the son of Shakuni—sent as Duryodhana’s envoy, delivers warnings to Krishna, the Pandavas, and their key allies.

The Kaurava forces march to Kurukshetra, where Duryodhana’s banner, bearing a serpent emblem and fixed to a gem-studded staff, is raised. Before the battle begins, Duryodhana consults Drona to assess the strength and key warriors on both sides. Duryodhana is classified as maharathi class of warrior.

=== Kurukshetra war ===
==== Day 1–11 (Bhishma Parva) ====
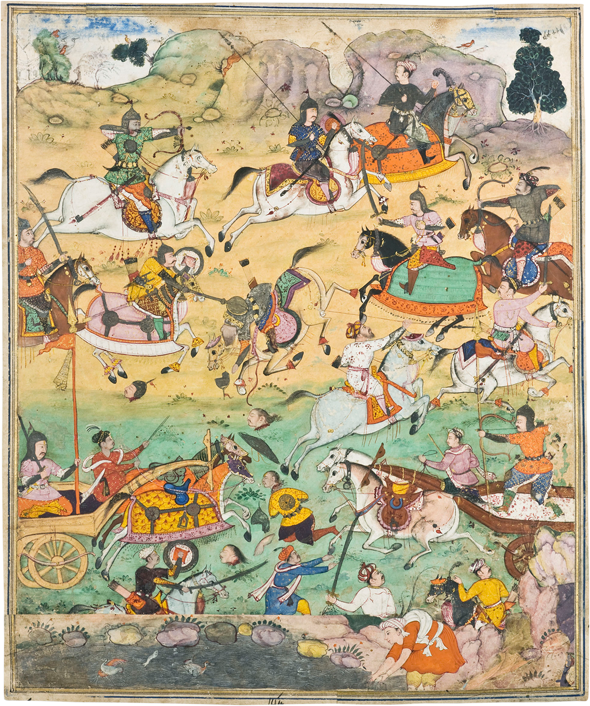
A folio from Razmnama depicting a duel between Bhima and Duryodhana

At the onset of battle, Duryodhana takes an active role in the fighting.On the first day, Bhima strikes him with arrows, causing him to faint. He retaliates with the support of the elephant division, momentarily incapacitating Bhima. However, Bhima confronts him again, and Duryodhana faints once more. He also suffers defeat at the hands of Dhrishtadyumna.

As the battle progresses, Bhima kills eight of Duryodhana’s brothers in quick succession, leading him to weep before Bhishma. Duryodhana later fights Ghatotkacha, killing four of his rakshasa attendants. Later, he kills Visharada, son of Kunti-Bhoja. In another encounter, he overpowers Bhima to the point of unconsciousness.

Duryodhana directs Shalya to engage Yudhishthira and repeatedly visits Bhishma in anguish over mounting losses. He clashes with several Pandava allies, including Satyaki, Abhimanyu, Yudhishthira, Yudhamanyu, and Uttamaujas, facing defeat in multiple instances.

==== Day 12–15 (Drona Parva) ====
With Bhishma fallen, Duryodhana appoints Drona as commander-in-chief. During Drona’s leadership, he openly criticises him for his lackluster performance, prompting Drona to become enraged and destroy large parts of Pandava army the following day. During these days, he also prays for Drona’s blessing to capture Yudhishthira alive and later embraces him after seeing the Pandava forces falter. After Lakshmana—Duryodhana's son—is killed by Abhimanyu, Duryodhana incites his warriors to kill Abhimanyu and encourages Karna to engage him directly.

Duryodhana later consoles Jayadratha after the latter flees in fear of Arjuna. Acknowledging his own inability to face Arjuna, he accepts a protective talisman from Drona, but still flees when defeated. He suffers further losses against Satyaki, and eventually, after continued defeats and the death of Jayadratha, begins to lose morale. In frustration, he accuses Drona of failure, is defeated again by Yudhishthira and Bhima, and attempts a covert assault by deputing Shakuni to target the Pandavas. He prompts Alambusha to battle Ghatotkacha and personally engages Nakula, only to be defeated.

Following Drona’s death on the fifteenth day, Duryodhana flees the battlefield in panic. Despite this setback, he appoints Karna as the new commander of the Kaurava forces.

==== Day 16–17 (Karna Parva) ====
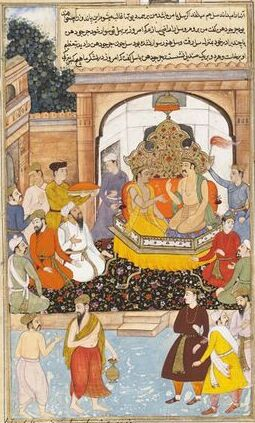
Duryodhana requests Shalya to become Karna's charioteer, folio from Razmnama

Under Karna’s leadership, Duryodhana resumes offensive operations. He requests Shalya to serve as Karna’s charioteer, but the proposal initially angers Shalya, who eventually agrees after being appeased. Duryodhana challenges Yudhishthira but is defeated. But, he defeats Nakula and Sahadeva, though he ultimately suffers further defeat at Bhima’s hands.

In the continued fighting, Duryodhana kills the Kulinda king (a Pandava ally) Additionally, he alone managed to resist all the Pandavas and he repelled the Pandavas' group attack single-handedly. When Ashwatthama proposes compromise, Duryodhana rejects it. Dushasana's and Karna’s deaths on the seventeenth day leaves Duryodhana overwhelmed with grief and shaken.

==== Day 18 (Shalya Parva) ====
With Karna dead, Duryodhana refuses final peace offers from Kripa and resolves to continue the war. He appoints Shalya as commander-in-chief.

However, the Pandavas kill Shalya, Shakuni, Uluka, and all of the remaining brothers of Duryodhana. The Pandavas together attack Duryodhana but are unsuccessful as Duryodhana alone resists and defeats all of them. Duryodhana also kills a Yadava warrior named Chekitana on that day. Later, he tries to defeat Dhrishtadyumna who is destroying the retreating Kaurava army. However, Dhrishtadyumna kills Duryodhana's charioteer and destroys his chariot, forcing Duryodhana to flee.

==== Gada Yuddha ====
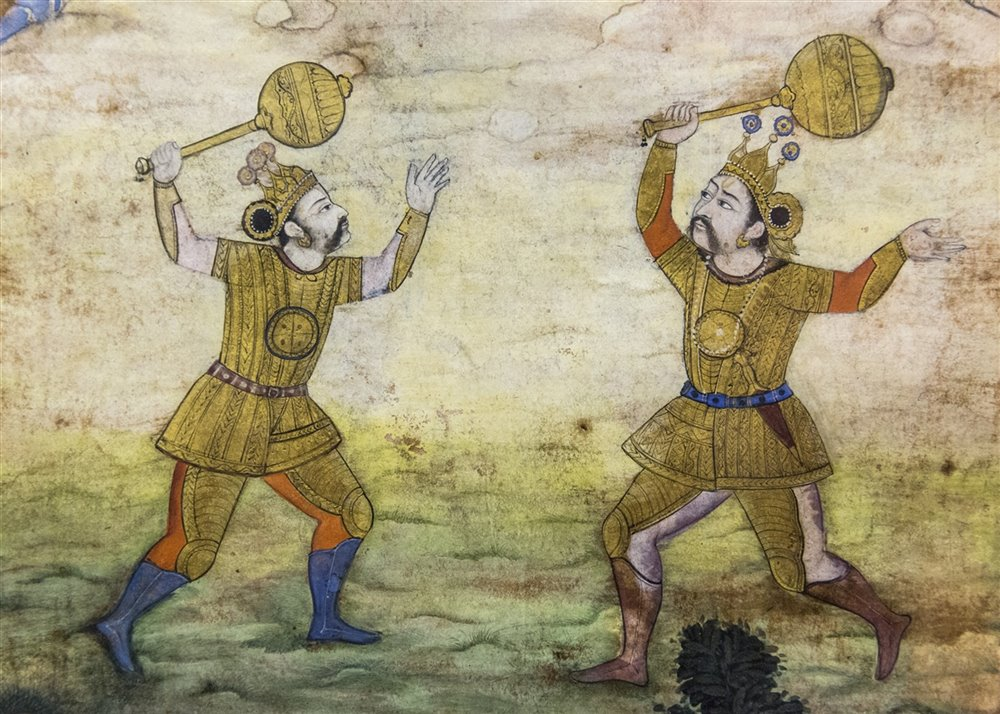
Duel between Duryodhan and Bhima. Illustrated folio from Razmnama (Persian translation of Mahabharata). 1598 A.D.

After suffering repeated defeats and with his army reduced to a few survivors, Duryodhana flees the battlefield and conceals himself in a lake and remain hidden beneath its surface. Ashwatthama, Kripa, and Kritavarma locate his hiding place and urge him to return to the field, but Duryodhana expresses a strong disinclination to continue the war.

Yudhishthira later visits the lake and calls out to Duryodhana, who initially replies from underwater. On Yudhishthira’s insistence, Duryodhana emerges and agrees to a final confrontation. Yudhishthira offers him a last opportunity to claim victory: he may choose any one of the Pandava brothers to fight in single combat with a weapon of his choice. Despite his mastery of the mace and potential advantage against others, Duryodhana chooses to face Bhima—his long-standing rival.

As Duryodhana prepares for the duel, ominous signs appear—storms, thunder, dust clouds, and lightning signal impending doom. The two warriors, both trained by Balarama, engage in a brutal mace fight. Duryodhana displays superior technique and gradually wears Bhima down, nearly causing him to faint. Observing the battle, Krishna reminds Bhima of his oath—made after the dice game—by clapping his thigh. Reinvigorated, Bhima targets Duryodhana’s thigh and delivers a decisive blow, shattering it and bringing his rival to the ground.

As Duryodhana lies mortally wounded, he protests that Bhima’s strike below the waist violates the rules of mace fighting. Bhima further insults him by placing his foot on Duryodhana’s face. Enraged by what he sees as an unfair act, Balarama raises his weapon to punish Bhima, but Krishna intervenes. He reminds Balarama of Duryodhana’s misdeeds throughout the war and rebukes him for attempting to influence a conflict he chose not to join.

Fallen, Duryodhana exchanges harsh words with Krishna but answers each one calmly. Duryodhana delivers a final speech that reaffirms his commitment to ksatriya ideals: courage, loyalty, and the refusal to yield even in death, as well as embraces martyadharma (the law of mortality) as ordained by Dhātr, a cosmic force devoid of personal divinity.

=== Death and aftermath ===
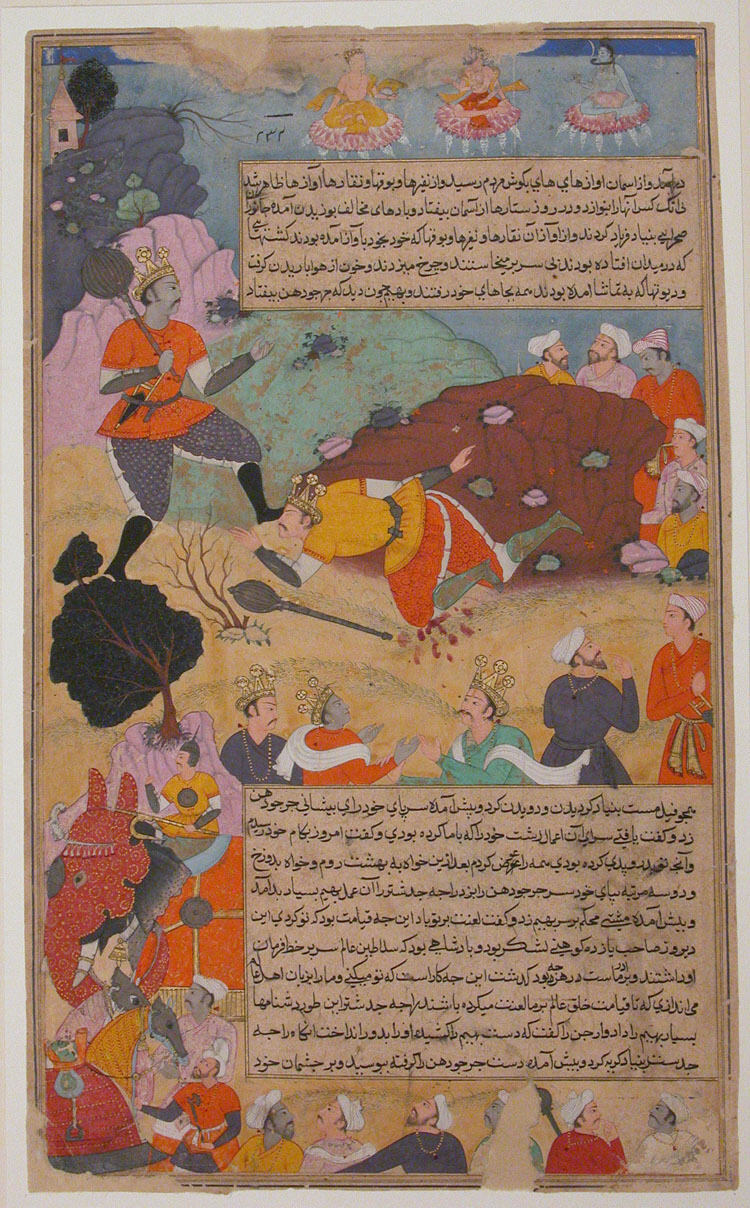
Duryodana defeated by Bhima – A scene from Razmanama

After the duel between Bhima and Duryodhana ends and the Pandavas depart, Ashwatthama, Kripacharya, and Kritavarma—who have observed the fight from a distance—approach Duryodhana's broken body. Out of respect for his honour, they refrain from interfering during the combat. Ashwatthama, grieving the fall of his friend and determined to avenge the Kauravas, vows to continue the war. With Duryodhana’s permission, he is appointed as the new commander of the Kaurava army and sets out to annihilate the remaining Pandava forces.

That night, Ashwatthama enters the Pandava camp and massacres the Upapandavas—the sons of the Pandavas—and the last surviving warriors of the Panchalas. He returns to the dying Duryodhana and reports. Duryodhana dies in peace, satisfied that his enemies have suffered in return.

Later, the sage Vyasa uses his mystical powers to raise the souls of fallen heroes from the Ganga, among them the soul of Duryodhana. After the Pandavas retire from the world, only Yudhishthira reaches heaven in his physical body. There, to his astonishment, he finds Duryodhana residing in splendour, shining like the sun and surrounded by divine beings. When Yudhishthira questions this, Narada explains that Duryodhana, despite his earthly flaws, fulfilled his religious and warrior duties and thus attained a place in heaven.

=== Personal life ===
In the Shanti Parva, the divine sage Narada narrates the marriage of Duryodhana with the daughter of King Chitrangada of Kalinga. Duryodhana abducts her from her swayamvara (self-choice ceremony) with the help of Karna in the wake of having been rejected by her. On reaching Hastinapur, Duryodhana justifies his act by giving the example of his grandfather Bhishma abducting three princesses of Kashi for his stepbrother.

In addition to the Kalinga princess, the Southern Recension and Gita Press translation records his chief wife as the princess of Kashi, the daughter of King Kashiraja, who is noted for welcoming Draupadi when she first arrives in Hastinapura.

In the Mahabharata, Lakshmana is mentioned as Duryodhana's son. Little is revealed about him other than his death in the Kurukshetra War.

In the Bhagavata Purana, a daughter—Lakshmanā—is introduced, who was abducted from her svayamvara by Krishna's son, Samba.

== Assessment ==
Duryodhana is prominently recognized as the primary antagonist in the Mahabharata, with his negative qualities frequently emphasized. According to James L. Fitzgerald, the epic portrays him as lacking sound judgment and bringing dishonor to the Kuru lineage. He is described as a divisive figure, detested universally, who inflamed conflict to catastrophic proportions, ultimately leading to widespread destruction across the earth. Metaphorically, the Adi Parva calls Duryodhana as the 'tree of wrath', with Shakuni being called his 'branches', Karna its 'trunk', Dushasana its 'fruits' and Dhritarashtra its 'roots'.

However, James G. Lochtefeld offers a more nuanced interpretation, suggesting that while the central conflict of the Mahabharata revolves around Duryodhana’s hostility toward the Pandavas, it is reductive to view him as wholly evil. Instead, Lochtefeld characterizes Duryodhana as a proud and obstinate individual, whose inability to acknowledge his faults and his refusal to yield any ground to the Pandavas contribute to his downfall. These flaws, he notes, were exacerbated by the absence of firm guidance from his father, Dhritarashtra, whose judgement is blinded by fatherly love.

David Gitomer classifies Duryodhana as an anti-hero rather than an evil villain. He argues that Duryodhana embodies not merely villainy but an older, this-worldly heroism rooted in kshatriya dharma, which stands in opposition to the emerging bhakti-oriented worldview centered around Krishna. Gitomer sees the Mahabharata as a "repository of crisis" in classical Indian discourse, a text where various ideological and dharmic tensions were debated. Within this framework, Duryodhana emerges as a problematic figure: while he is remembered for his misdeeds—including the gambling episode, Draupadi’s humiliation, and attempts on Bhima’s life—he is also persistently referred to as 'King' Duryodhana, or even an ati-kṣatriya (super-warrior). He resists Krishna’s divinely sanctioned intervention, refusing to submit to the theocratic model of kingship represented by the Pandavas. Gitomer notes that for Duryodhana, who does not accept Krishna’s divine status, Krishna's tactics appear as unfair, undermining kshatriya values of honour and open combat. This opposition becomes the basis of his “trans-ethical” sin: resisting not merely the Pandavas, but the metaphysical order Krishna represents.

Beyond his role in the dynastic conflict, Duryodhana's relationship with Karna is often cited as a profound example of friendship and loyalty. Karna evolves into a character who shares Duryodhana's view that Pandavas are bad and enemies, though for different reasons. Karna participates with Duryodhana in schemes to effect the downfall of the Pandavas. Duryodhana provides the goals, Karna conspires the means to get there. Duryodhana has resentful intentions and is a bad king, but it is Karna who fuels Duryodhana's ambitions and fights his battles.

== Derivative works ==
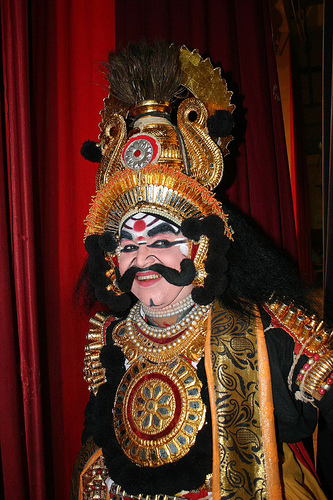
A Yakshagana actor dressed as Duryodhana

Gitomer points out that the tension between the older martial ethos and the newer devotional ethos persists not only in the epic’s multiple strata but also in derivative Sanskrit dramas such as Bhasa's plays and Bhatta Narayana’s Venīsaṃhāra. Interestingly, even in texts composed by avowed Vaishnava authors, Duryodhana is not uniformly portrayed as a tyrant. Instead, he is often granted tragic legitimacy, particularly in scenes where his downfall is accompanied by stoic affirmations of martial valour and personal dignity.

Urubhangam is a Sanskrit play written by Bhasa in the 2nd or 3rd century AD with Duryodhana as its primary protagonist. Written as a tragedy, the drama focuses on his point of view of the events of Mahabharata. His portrayal as a tragic hero is especially unique within the body of works in Sanskrit drama.

Beyond Sanskrit plays, Duryodhana is a key part in folklores and regional cultures across the sub-continent. The story of Duryodhana is one of the central topics of Yakshagana, a traditional dance-play practised in Karnataka and Terukkuttu, a Tamil street theatre form practised in Tamil Nadu state of India and Tamil-speaking regions of Sri Lanka.

== See also ==
- Kaurava
- Kali (demon)
- Mahabharata
