= Duhshasana =

One of the Kauravas in the epic Mahabharata

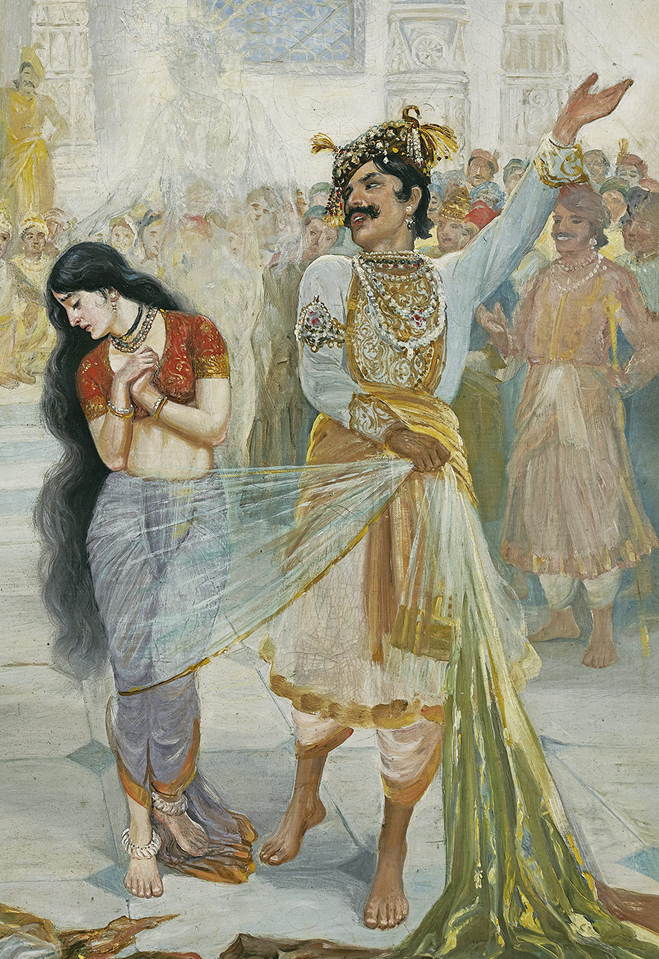
- Duhshasana disrobing Draupadi, painting by M. V. Dhurandhar, c. 1922

Information
- Family: Dhritarashtra (father); Gandhari (mother); Duryodhana, Vikarna, Chitrasena and 96 other brothers; Duhshala (sister); Yuyutsu (half-brother)
- Children: Drumasena (son)
- Relatives: Pandavas (paternal half-cousins); Shakuni (maternal uncle); Uluka (maternal cousin)

Duhshasana (Sanskrit: दुःशासन, romanized: Duḥśāsana, lit. 'hard to rule') or Dushshasana (Sanskrit: दुश्शासन, romanized: Duśśāsana) is a prominent character in the ancient Hindu epic Mahabharata. He is the second eldest of the hundred Kaurava brothers, born to King Dhritarashtra and Queen Gandhari of the Kuru dynasty. As the younger brother and close confidant of Duryodhana, the chief antagonist of the epic, Duhshasana plays a significant role in many key events leading up to and during the Kurukshetra War.

Duhshasana is best known for his active involvement in the humiliation of Draupadi, the wife of the Pandavas, during the infamous dice game episode, where he dragged her in the royal court and unsuccessfully attempted to disrobe her. His actions earn him the wrath of Draupadi and the Pandavas, particularly Bhima, who vows to kill Duhshasana—a vow that is ultimately fulfilled during the war by tearing apart his chest.

== Etymology ==
His name derives from the Sanskrit words duḥ- "hard" and śāsana "rule"; thus duḥśāsana means "[one who is] hard to rule."

== Birth and early life ==
When Dhritarashtra's queen Gandhari's pregnancy continued for an unusually long time, she beat her womb in frustration and out of jealousy towards Kunti, the wife of Pandu, who had just given birth to Yudhishthira (the eldest of the five Pandava brothers). At this, a hardened mass of grey-coloured flesh emerged from her womb. Gandhari was devastated and called upon Vyasa, the great sage who had prophesied she would give birth to one hundred sons, to redeem his words.

Vyasa divided the ball of flesh into one hundred and one equal pieces, each piece no bigger than a thumb. He put them in pots of milk, which were sealed and buried in the earth for two years. At the end of the second year, the first pot was opened and Duryodhana emerged. Within a period of one month all the other 99 sons and single daughter of Dhritarashtra were born. Duhshasana was the second after Duryodhana.

Duhshasana was devoted to his older brother Duryodhana. He (along with Duryodhana and Shakuni) was very closely involved in the various schemes and plots to kill the Pandavas.

== Draupadi's humiliation ==
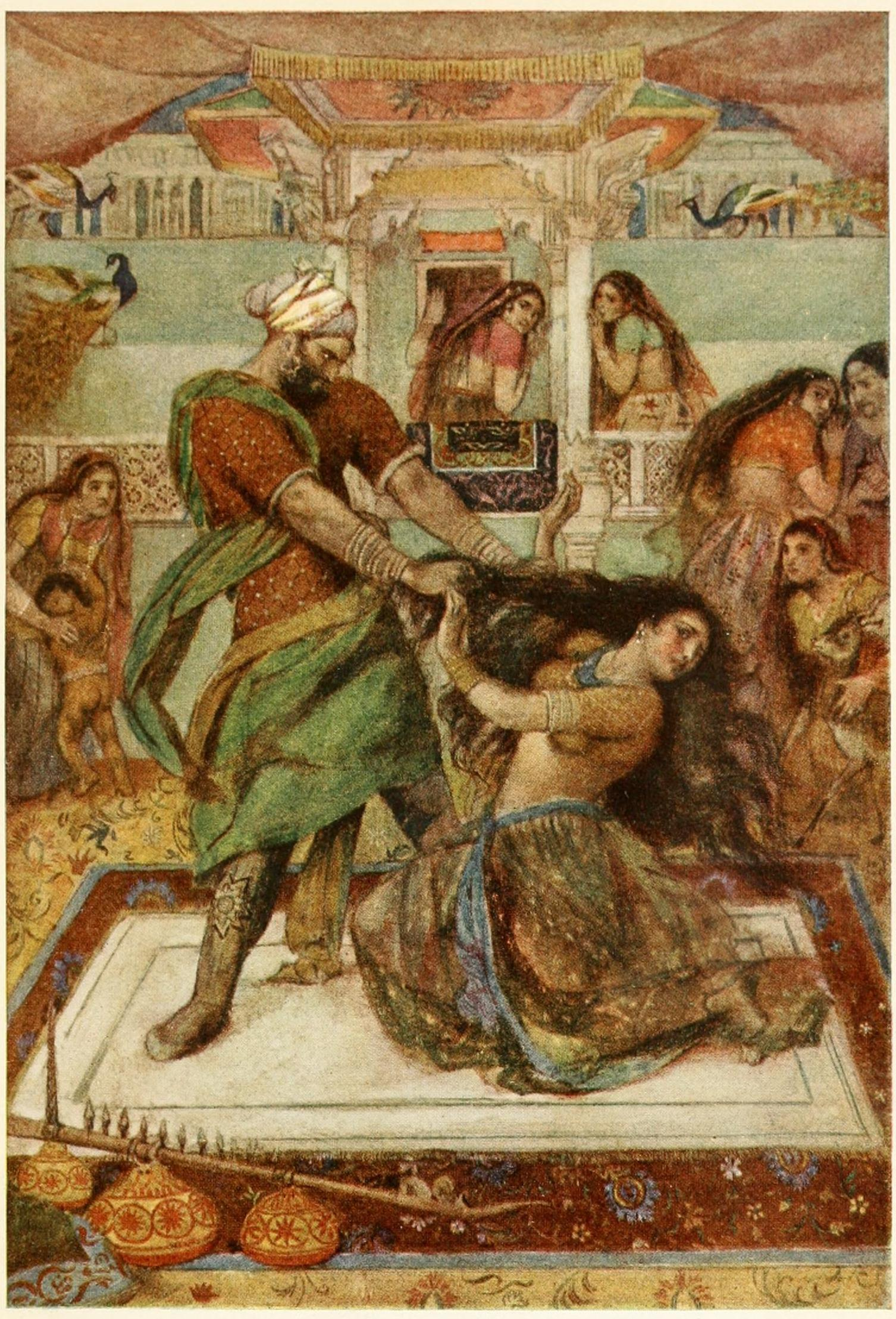
Duhshasana dragging Draupadi from her chamber

After Yudhishthira lost a game of dice with Shakuni—losing first his kingdom, then his brothers and his wife Draupadi—Duhshasana, at the behest of his brother Duryodhana, dragged Draupadi by the hair into the assembly and tried to disrobe her. Draupadi prayed to Krishna, who made her sari to be of an infinite length so that Duhshasana could not take it off. The assembled men were amazed at this miracle. They condemned Duhshasana and praised Draupadi. However, Draupadi was humiliated at being dragged into court by her hair. Unlike the critical version, some tellings of the story say that she swore that she would never again tie up her hair until it was washed in Duhshasana's blood. Then Bhima, who could no longer watch Draupadi's insult in silence, arose. He vowed to tear open Duhshasana's chest in battle and drink his blood. Bhima also exclaimed that if he could not fulfill his oath, then he would not meet his ancestors in heaven.

== Kurukshetra war and death ==
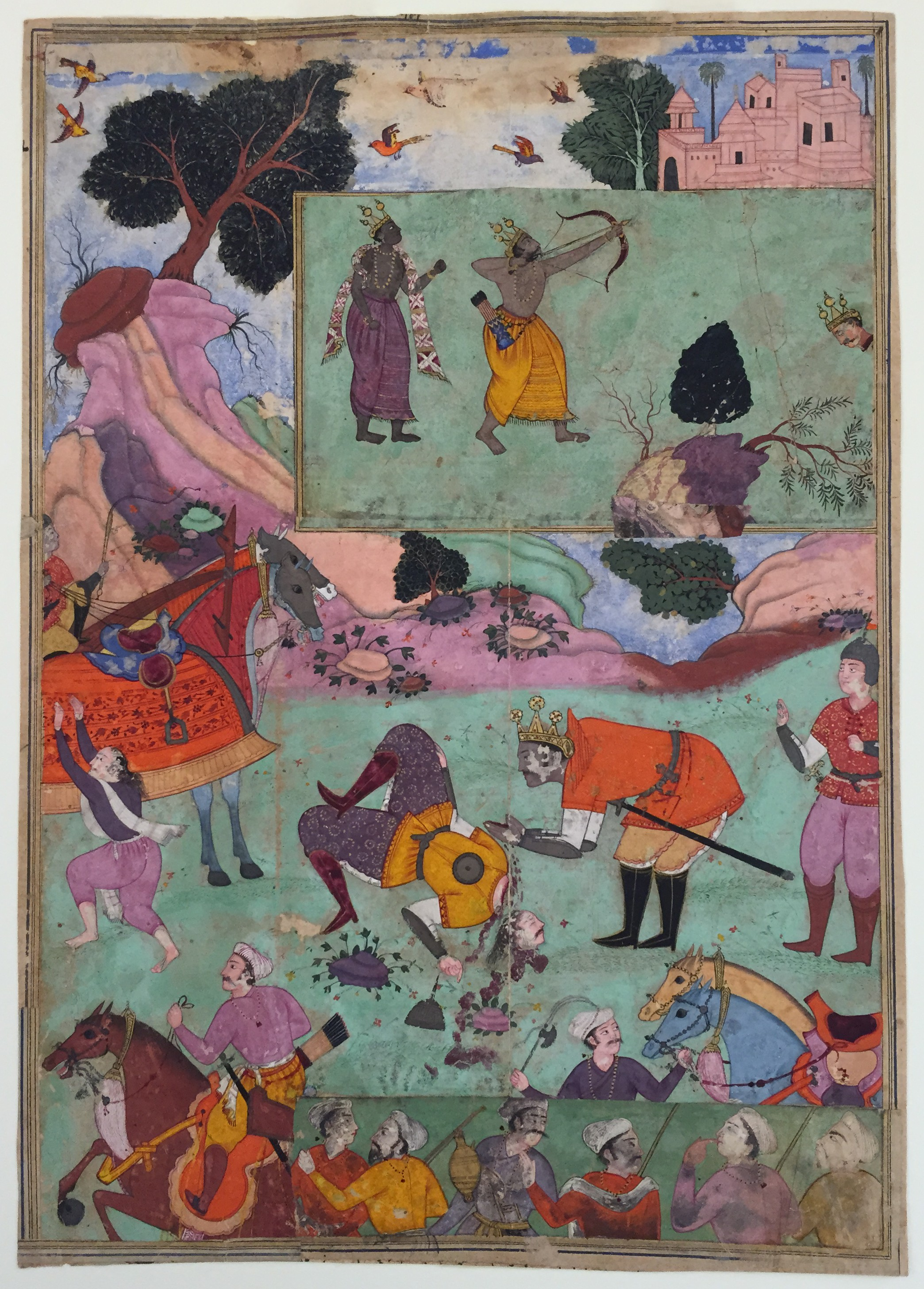
Bhima drinks Duhshasana's blood, Razmnama illustration

Duhshasana played an important role in Kurukshetra War and fought many warriors.

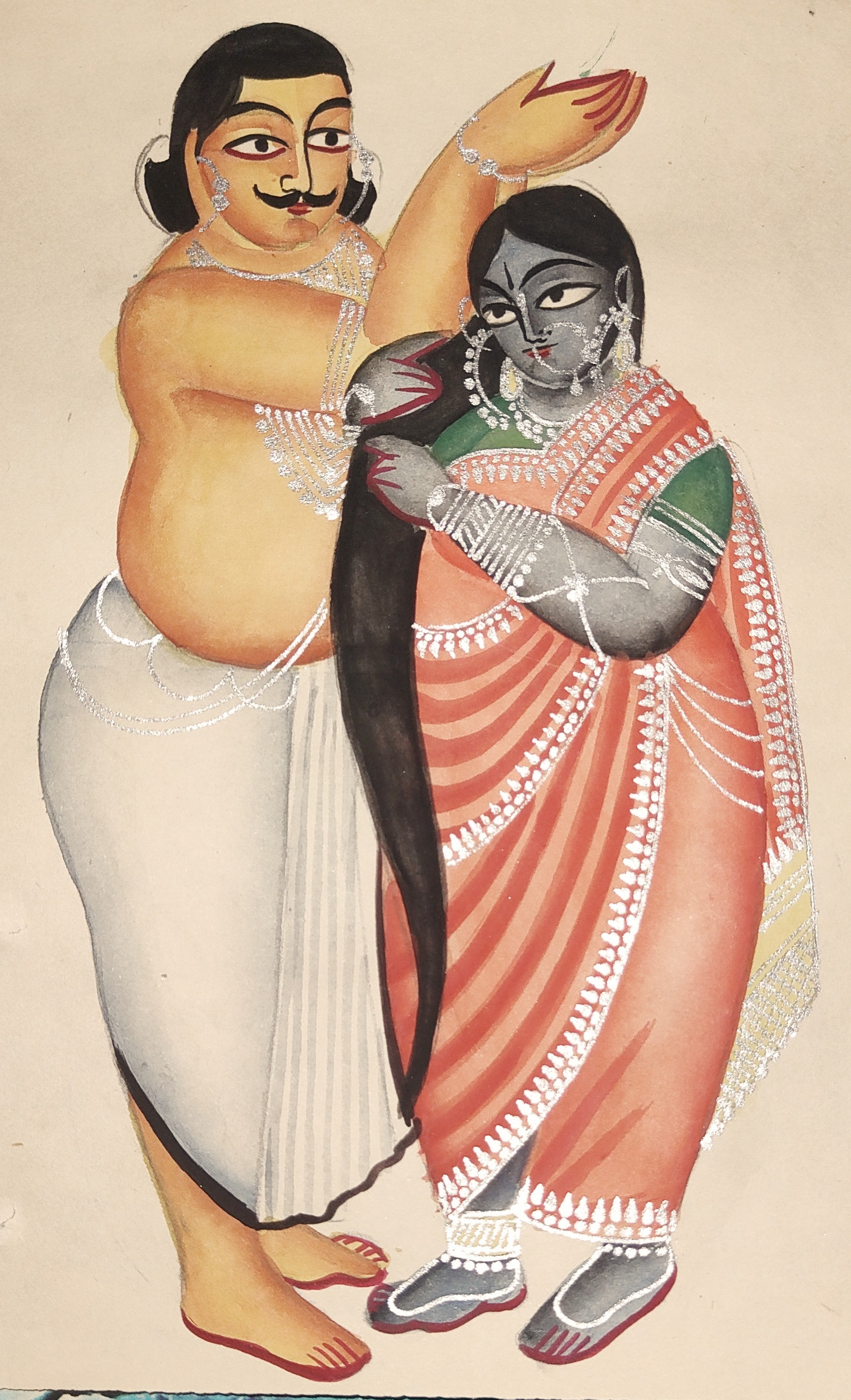
Bhima washes the tresses of Draupadi with the blood of Duhshasana, Mahabharata; Kalighat Painting

On the first day of war, Duhshasana was the first one to shot the first arrow. He fought a fierce battle with Nakula and later with Yudhishthira and was defeated by them. On the second day of war, Duhshasana killed Nakula's bodyguards. An angry Nakula defeated and nearly killed Duhshasana in a sword fight. On the 10th day of war, Duhshasana attacked and injured Shikhandi in order to save Bhishma. On the 13th day of war, Duhshasana was among the powerful warriors who brutally murdered Abhimanyu. Abhimanyu badly injured Duhshasana. Later, his son Drumasena killed Abhimanyu. On the 14th day, Duhshasana tried to stop Arjuna from reaching to Jayadratha but was defeated by him in a small archery duel. During the night war, Duhshasana defeated and killed Virata's bodyguards. On the 16th day of the Kurukshetra War, Duhshasana killed Magadha's minister Vrihanta. On the 17th day, Bhima fought with Duhshasana in a mace war and beat him. When Duhshasana was unable to fight Bhima uprooted both the arms of Duhshasana. Then he took out his armour, tore his chest using his bare hands and killed Duhshasana. Duhshasana's death was the most brutal death in the entire epic. To fulfill his oath, Bhima drank the blood from Duhshasana's open chest. The soldiers who witnessed this brutal scene fainted, thinking of Bhima as a monster. All the Kaurava supporting warriors were highly disturbed by this scene.

Though not attested in the Mahabharata, according to folk narratives, Bhima washed Draupadi's hair with Duhshasana's blood as a symbolic revenge for her humiliation.
