= Yuyutsu =

Character of the Mahabharata

Information
- Gender: Male
- Weapon: Bow and arrows
- Family: Dhritarashtra (father); a Vaishya concubine (mother); Gandhari (step-mother); 100 half brothers including Duryodhana, Dushasana and Vikarna; Duhsala (half-sister)

Yuyutsu (Sanskrit: युयुत्सु) is a character in the ancient Hindu epic Mahabharata. He is the son of King Dhritarashtra of the Kuru dynasty and a Vaishya concubine (named Sauvali in later texts), who serves as an attendant to Dhritarashtra's queen, Gandhari. This makes Yuyutsu the paternal half-brother of Duryodhana, the other ninety-nine Kaurava brothers, and their sister Dushala. On the eve of the Kurukshetra War, Yuyutsu defects from the Kaurava camp and joins the Pandavas, becoming the only son of Dhritarashtra to survive the war.

== Etymology ==
The word yuyutsu is an adjective formed from the desiderative stem of the verb root "yudh" (fight, wage war), meaning "wishing to fight, bellicose." The Mahabharata cites the following other names for Yuyutsu-

- Dhārtarāstra (धार्तराष्ट्र) - son of Dhritarashtra
- Kauravya (कौरव्य) - descendant of Kuru

== Birth ==
Yuyutsu was a son of Dhritrashtra. His birth occurred after Gandhari failed to give birth to a child after a year, despite her pregnancy. Dhritarashtra, consumed by his desire for an heir, turned to her maid, who was not of the warrior caste and not married to him, and their union resulted in Yuyutsu. Not much is known about his early life. However, unlike his brothers, Yuyutsu was on favourable terms with the Pandavas, warning them about Duryodhana's schemes. According to Dhritarashtra, Yuyutsu vanquished many kings in Varanavata.

== Righteous in the Kaurava camp ==
Yuyutsu is celebrated as a moral warrior who chose the path of righteousness, in spite of being born in circumstances that could've influenced his decision to choose right side. He forwent his family bonds in order to side with dharma.

As the war was about to begin, Yudhishthira made an announcement in the battlefield, saying anybody who wishes to change sides can do it then, before conches are blown. It is at this moment that Yuyutsu changed sides and took the side of righteousness.

Additionally, Yuyutsu saved the life of Bhima by informing the Pandavas about Duryodhana's cunning schemes, which included poisoning water. Both Yuyutsu and Vikarna abhorred Duryodhana's conspiracies and evil schemes; however, Vikarna stays loyal to the family and perishes in the war. Yuyutsu shifts from Kaurava camp to the Pandava camp. Yuyutsu fought the battle on the side of the Pandavas. He was one among the 11 Maharathis (capable of fighting 720,000 warriors simultaneously) among the son of Dhritarashtra. Yuyutsu was one among the eleven warriors to have survived the war. He had a few notable encounters. On the seventh day, he is wounded by Kripacharya in a sword fight but survives. On the Sixteenth day, he fights with Shakuni’s son Ulooka and wounds him, but fails to kill him as he flees.

== After the War ==
When the Pandavas decided to retire from the world at the start of the Kali Yuga and departure of Krishna, Yudhishthira gave the charge of supervising the kingdom to Yuyutsu while Parikshit was made the king.

== See also ==
- Karna
