= Vikarna =

Character in the Hindu epic Mahabharata

- Mahabharata character
- Vikarna seated among his brothers led by Duryodhana, Pahari painting

Information
- Affiliation: Kaurava
- Weapon: Bow and Arrow
- Family: Gandhari (mother); Dhritarashtra (father); 99 brothers including; Duryodhana; Duhshasana; Duhshala (sister); Yuyutsu (half-brother)
- Relatives: Pandavas (paternal cousins); Shakuni (maternal uncle)
- Home: Kuru Kingdom
- Dynasty: Chandravamsha

Vikarna (Sanskrit: विकर्ण, vikarṇa) is a character in the Hindu epic Mahabharata. He is the third most prominent of the hundred Kaurava brothers, after Duryodhana and Duhshasana, but is regarded the most reputable among them. Vikarna is a son of King Dhritarashtra and Queen Gandhari of Kuru Kingdom. In the epic, his most prominent appearance occurs during the humiliation of Draupadi, the wife of his cousins—the Pandavas. Unlike most of his brothers, Vikarna openly opposed the event, questioning the morality and legality of Draupadi's treatment. However, his protest was ignored by the Duryodhana and his allies. Despite his moral objections, Vikarna remained loyal to Duryodhana and fought on the Kaurava side during the Kurukshetra War. He was eventually killed by Pandava Bhima, who had vowed to slay the Kaurava brothers.

== Etymology ==
The word Vikarna has two meanings. Basically it is made from two words. First word is vinā (विना) or vishāla (विशाल), while second word is karna (कर्ण. vinā means 'without' and vishāla means 'large'. And karna means 'ears'. So this name contains two meanings. Either it is 'the one who is earless' or 'large eared'. This could say something about his character. It is possible that the name Vikarna basically came from his character of either not listening to anyone(self-esteemed) or who listens and captures wisdom through his (large)ears.

While Karna cheered his friend Duryodhan and encouraged him to disrobe Droupadi, the Vikarna opposed Karna and speaks of righteous behaviour and proper respectful conduct towards women. Vikarna also means the exact opposite of Karna.

== Adolescence ==
Vikarna was one of Drona's students who excelled in archery like Arjuna. On completing their training, Drona asked the Kauravas to bring him Drupada as a guru dakshina. Duryodhana, Dushasana, Yuyutsu, Vikarna, and the remaining Kauravas with the Hastinapura army attacked Panchala. Their attack was repelled. Vikarna and his brothers were forced to flee and abandon the field.

== Game of dice ==
During the infamous dice game of the Mahabharata, Vikarna raised his voice against the game as a whole, and specifically, at the mistreatment of Draupadi . Vikarna echoed the questions Draupadi had already asked the Kuru elders, demanding that her questions be answered. His protests were met with silence, even from the wise elders like Bhishma and Drona.

In the silence, and depending on the version of the story, Karna later rebuked and taunted Vikarna for his outburst. Vikarna quietly replied:

The sister-in-law's insult is an affront to the entire Kuru clan. If her questions are not answered, our line is doomed.

— Vikarna,

Madhvacharya states in his commentary that in reality, Vikarna's protest was only to make a show of righteousness; this assessment is however at odds with the sympathetic nature of his fatal encounter with Bhima, who esteems Vikarna's character as a man of dharma.

== Death ==
Despite his misgivings, Vikarna fights for Duryodhana during the Kurukshetra War. Bhishma names him as one of the great warriors on the Kaurava side. Mentioned throughout the war, Vikarna has a few notable moments. On the fourth day of the war, he attempts to check Abhimanyu's advance, and is severely repulsed. On the fifth day of the war, he attempts to break the King of Mahismati's defense of the Pandava formation, and is unsuccessful. On the seventh day, he covers the retreat of his brothers from Bhima's rampage. On the same day he stops and repulses Drupada and Shikandi and wounds them badly, causing them to retreat. On the tenth day, he attempts to prevent Arjuna and Shikhandi from reaching Bhishma, but is counter-checked by Drupada.

On the thirteenth day of the war, depending on the version of the story, Vikarna is a silent bystander in the slaying of Abhimanyu. On the fourteenth day, Arjuna navigates the chakravyuha of Drona, in order to reach and kill Jayadratha before sunset. Duryodhana sends Vikarna to check Bhima's advance. Bhima, who had sworn to kill all of Dhritarashtra's true-born sons, calls Vikarna a man of dharma and advises him to step aside. Vikarna replies that even though he knew that the Kauravas would not win a war against a side with Krishna on it, he could not forsake Duryodhana. Pleadingly, Bhima reminds him of the dice game, where Vikarna had criticised his brother. Vikarna replied:

That was my duty then, and this is my duty now. Fight me, o son of Vayu!

— Vikarna challenging Bhima,

Bhima promises him a swift and painless death and quickly dispatches Vikarna; in some versions of the story Vikarna asks for Bhima to perform his last rites. His death brings tears to the eyes of Bhima. After his death, Bhima laments:

Alas, O Vikarna, you were just and knew what was dharma! You fought in loyal obedience to the call of duty. Indeed this battle is a curse upon us wherein men like you...have had to be slaughtered.

— Bhima upon Vikarna's death

== Analysis ==
Vikarna is comparable to Kumbhakarna from the Ramayana. Both Vikarna and Kumbhakarna acknowledged that their elder brother's actions are against dharma but ultimately they remained loyal to Duryodhana and Ravana respectively. Vikarna is contrasted with Yuyutsu, who defected to Pandavas at the onset of the Kurukshetra War.
