= Stri Parva =

Eleventh book of Indian epic Mahabharata

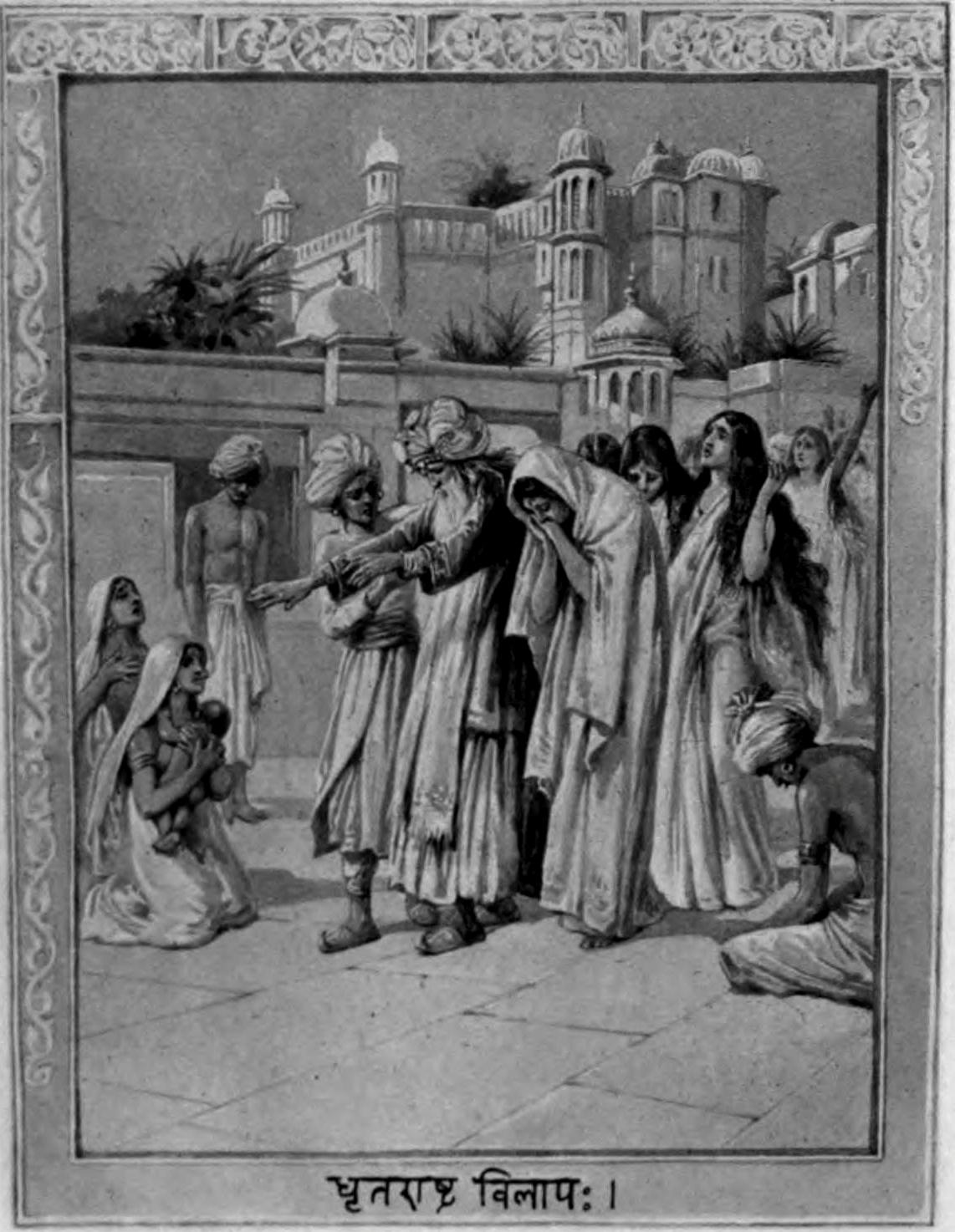
Dhritarashtra and the royal women lamenting the casualties of the Kurukshetra War, a scene from the Stri Parva illustrated by Evelyn Stuart Hardy

The Stri Parva (Sanskrit: स्त्री पर्व) ("Book of the Women") is the eleventh of the eighteen parvas (books) of the Indian epic Mahabharata. It traditionally has 4 parts and 27 chapters, as does the critical edition.

Sometimes spelled Stree Parva, it describes the grief of women because of the war, through the words of the Kaurava mother, Gandhari. The parva recites the grief of men too, such as of Dhritrashtra and the Pandava brothers. The chapters include a treatise by Vidura and Vyasa on passage rites with words of comfort for those who have lost loved ones, as well as the saṃsāra fable of the man and a well.

== Structure and chapters ==
The Stri Parva has 2 upa-parvas (parts, little books) and 27 adhyayas (chapters).

=== Jalapradanika Parva (chapters: 1–15) ===
Stri Parva recites the trauma and grief of women after the war. It opens with a statement of Dhritrashtra's grief at the death of all his sons and grandsons. Vidura, prime minister of the kingdom of Hastinapura and sage Vyasa console his grief with a treatise on death and emotional loss. These chapters present the theory of birth-rebirth. Dhristrashtra and the Kaurava women then visit the battlefield. Dhritarashtra on his way meets with the 3 remaining Kuru warriors. Having met the king thus, those brave warriors, separate from one another. Kripa goes to Hastinapura, Kritavarman repairs to his own kingdom, while the son of Drona sets off for the asylum of Vyasa, where he later encounters the sons of Pandu in Sauptika Parva and is vanquished by them. The women express their grief from loss and question war - they criticize both sides for unleashing the war and death.

The Pandava brothers and women from the Pandava side meet Dhristrashtra. The Kaurava king attempts to kill Bhima by crushing him with his arms in retaliation for Duryodhana's death. Ascertaining his evil intentions towards Bhima, Krishna drags away the real Bhima and presents the king with an iron statue. Dhritarashtra breaks that statue, then laments Bhima's death. Krishna tells him the truth and criticizes his actions, at which Dhristrashtra repents. The Pandavas with Krishna and sages thereafter go to see Gandhari, the upset and weeping Kaurava mother who had lost all her sons and grandsons in the war. Gandhari, afflicted with grief on account of the death of her sons, wants to curse king Yudhishthira. Sage Vyasa appears and reminds her of the wisdom she taught to her sons, "victory follows righteousness", then counsels her that the war was one fought for righteousness. Gandhari replies that she forgives the war, but finds it difficult to forgive actions during the war that were unjust. She demands to know why the rules of just war were abused, why cruelty (adharma) was practiced during the war. They debate whether the promise of quicker peace justify the use of weapons that kill indiscriminately, other war crimes and horrors by one side against the other side. Then she gets angry with Bhimasena's actions during his duel with her son and also his other cruel acts in war, like drinking Dussasana's blood. Sage Vyasa then reminds her of her sons cruel acts against Pandavas. Gandhari then wrathfully asks where king Yudhishthira is. King Yudhishthira, trembling and with joined hands, approaches her. He accepts his faults and in soft words tells her that he deserves to be cursed. Toward Yudhishthira who spoke such words, who is overcome with fear, Gandhari anger becomes pacified. The sages then present a different perspective. After Gandhari, the Pandava brothers meet Kunti and Draupadi, two women on the side of Pandavas, who express their own grief for the war. They grieve and suggest war is easy to start but war never ends, and its consequences are painfully long.

=== Stri-vilapa Parva (chapters: 16–27) ===
In later chapters of Stree Parva, Gandhari absorbed in grief, ascribed every fault to Kesava, for not doing anything even though he had the power to prevent the slaughter and unjust actions during the war. She then curses Krishna that his own Yadava clan will perish in similar manner as Kuru clan perished. And ladies of his race, shall weep and cry even as the ladies of the Bharata race. Krishna accepts her curse, and with faint smile said unto her that she aided him in the accomplishment of his task, of slaughtering all human beings in this world, possessing knowledge of celestial weapons, for what he came to earth. Dhristarashtra asks Yudhishthira as to how many people died and escaped from the 18-day Kurukshetra War on the two sides. Yudhishthira replies more than 1,660,000,000 men died, while 240,165 people escaped the Kurukshetra war. Then Dhritarashtra asked the king to perform funeral rites of those that have none to look after them. Kunti's son Yudhishthira of great wisdom commanded his priests to perform it. Those dead bodies were piled together in thousands of heaps and, at the command of Yudhishthira, were caused to be burnt by Vidura.

The two sides then together perform passage rites in river Ganges, in the memory of those who gave their lives during the war, with spouses of heroes, presented a spectacle of sorrow and cheerlessness. Then Kunti, weepingly addressed her sons that Karna was their eldest brother. Offer oblations of water unto that eldest brother of theirs who was born of her by the god of day, with a pair of ear-rings and mail. Hearing these painful words of their mother, the Pandavas began to express their grief for Karna. Copiously indulging in lamentations like these, king Yudhishthira the just uttered loud wails of woe, then offered oblations of water unto his deceased brother. All the ladies then griefs with loud wails and king Yudhishthira, then caused the wives and members of Karna's family to be brought before him. Having finished the ceremony, the king, with his senses exceedingly agitated, rose from the waters of Ganga.

Stri parva includes Vyasa's and Vidura's treatise about death and grief, passage rites in last two Chapters, as well as saṃsāra through the fable of the man, the forest, the bees, the honey, the elephant and a well in Chapters 2 through 7.

=== Alternate grouping ===
An alternate grouping of the sub-parvas:

1. Vishoka Parva (chapters: 1–8)
2. Stri Parva (Upa) (chapters: 9–25)
3. Shraddha Parva (chapter: 26)
4. Jalapradanika Parva (chapter: 27)

== English translations ==
Stri Parva was composed in Sanskrit. Some Sanskrit manuscripts discovered in different parts of India title the parts differently. Several translations in English are available. Two translations from 19th century, now in public domain, are those by Kisari Mohan Ganguli and Manmatha Nath Dutt. The translations vary with each translator's interpretations.

Clay Sanskrit Library has published a 15 volume set of the Mahabharata which includes a translation of Stri Parva by Kate Crosby. This translation is modern and uses an old manuscript of the Epic. The translation does not remove verses and chapters now widely believed to be spurious and smuggled into the Epic in 1st or 2nd millennium AD.

Debroy, in 2011, notes that updated critical edition of Stri Parva, after removing verses and chapters generally accepted so far as spurious and inserted into the original, has 4 parts, 27 adhyayas (chapters) and 713 shlokas (verses).

The entire parva has been "transcreated" and translated in verse by the poet Dr. Purushottama Lal published by Writers Workshop.

== Quotes and teachings ==
Jalapradanika parva, Chapter 2:

When all else is asleep, Time is awake, Time is irresistible.
Youth, beauty, life, possessions, health, and the companionship of friends, all are unstable.
It behoveth thee not to grieve for what is universal.
Do not indulge in your grief.
Grief itself, by being indulged in, never becomes light.
By dwelling on it, one cannot lessen it.
On the other hand, grief grows with indulgence.
One should treat mental grief by wisdom, just as physical grief should be treated by medicine.
Wisdom hath this power.

— Vidura, Stri Parva, Mahabharata Book xi.2

== See also ==
- Previous book of Mahabharata: Sauptika Parva
- Next book of Mahabharata: Shanti Parva
