= Kaurava =

100 sons of King Dhritarashtra and Gandhari in the epic Mahabharata

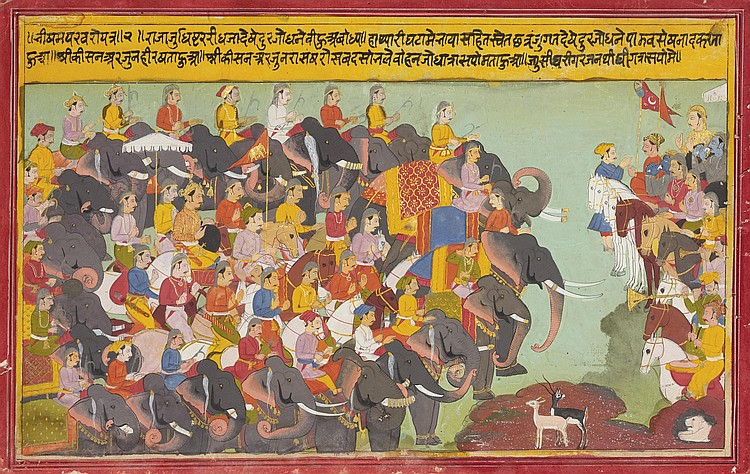
Kaurava army (left) faces the Pandavas. A 17th–18th century painting from Mewar, Rajasthan.

Kaurava is a Sanskrit patronymic referring to descendant of Kuru, a legendary king of India who is the ancestor of many of the characters of the epic Mahabharata. Usually, the term is used for the 100 sons of King Dhritarashtra and his wife Gandhari. Duryodhana, Duhshasana, Vikarna and Chitrasena are the best-known of the brothers. They also had a sister named Dussala and a half-brother named Yuyutsu.

== Etymology ==
The term Kauravas is used in the Mahabharata with two meanings ,

- The wider meaning is used to represent all the descendants of Kuru. This meaning, which includes the Pandav brothers, is often used in the earlier parts of popular renditions of the Mahabharata.
- The narrower but more common meaning is used to represent the elder line of the descendants of Kuru. This restricts it to the children of King Dhritarashtra, excluding the children of his younger brother, Pandu, whose children form the Pandava line.

The rest of this article deals with the Kaurava in the narrower sense, that is, the children of Dhritarashtra and Gandhari. When referring to these children, a more specific term is also used – Dhārtarāṣṭra (Sanskrit: धार्तराष्ट्र), a derivative of Dhritarashtra.

== Birth of Kauravas ==
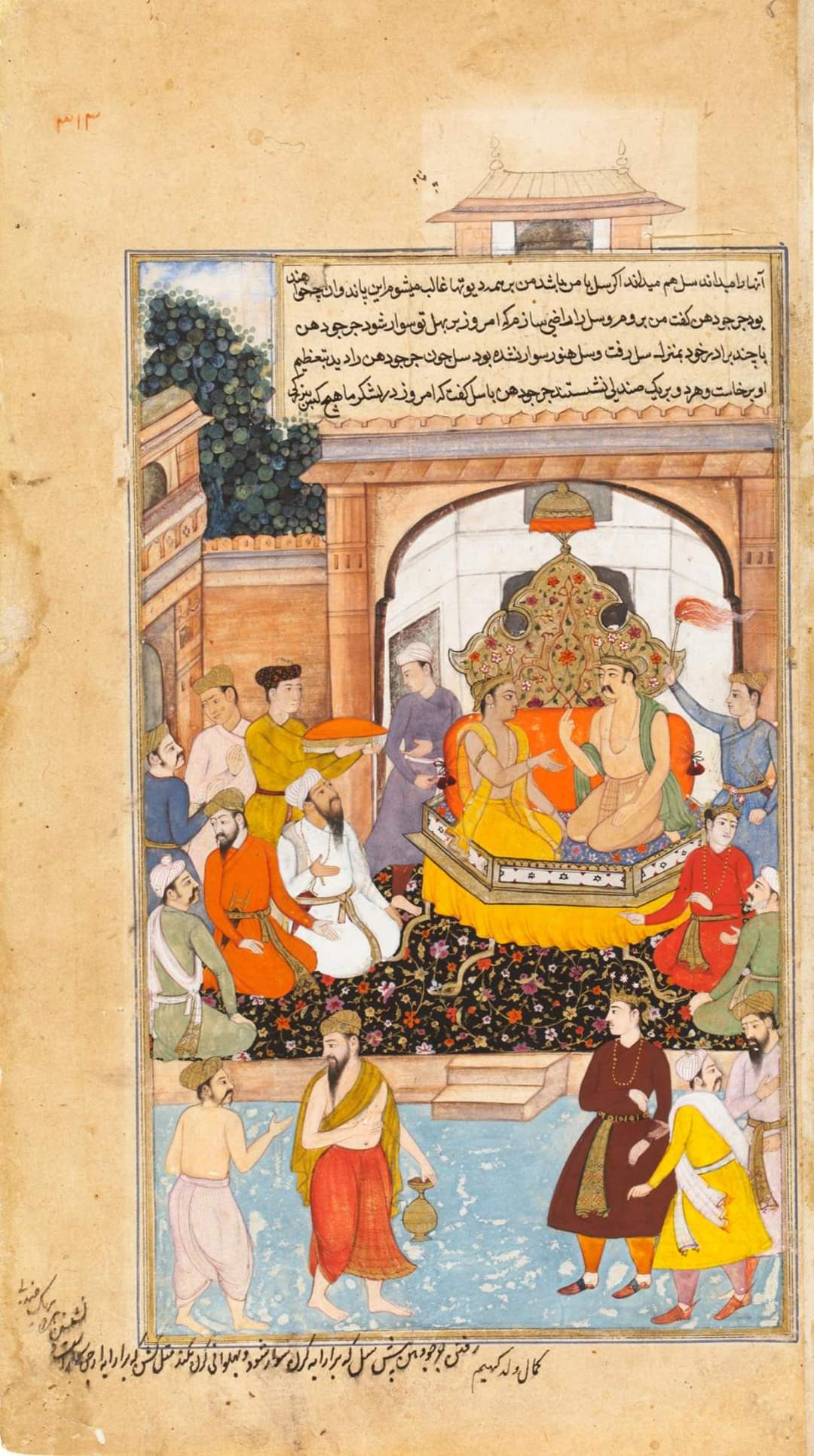
Duryodhana with his brothers 1598 from Razmnama

After Gandhari was married to Dhritarashtra, she wrapped a cloth over her eyes and vowed to share the darkness that her husband lived in. Once Sage Krishna Dwaipayana Vyasa came to visit Gandhari in Hastinapur and she took great care of the comforts of the great saint and saw that he had a pleasant stay in Hastinapur. The saint was pleased with Gandhari and granted her a boon. Gandhari wished for one hundred sons who would be as powerful as her husband. Dwaipayan Vyasa granted her the boon and in due course of time, Gandhari found herself to be pregnant. But two years passed and still, the baby was not born.. After two years of pregnancy, Gandhari gave birth to a hard piece of lifeless flesh that was not a baby at all. Gandhari was devastated as she had expected a hundred sons according to the blessing of Rishi Vyasa. She was about to throw away the piece of flesh while Rishi Vyasa appeared and told her that his blessings could not have been in vain and asked Gandhari to arrange for one hundred jars to be filled with ghee. He told Gandhari that he would cut the piece of flesh into a hundred pieces and place them in the jars, which would then develop into the one hundred sons that she so desired. Gandhari told Vyasa then that she also wanted to have a daughter. Vyasa agreed, cut the piece of flesh into one hundred and one-pieces, and placed them each into a jar. After two more years of patient waiting the jars were ready to be opened and were kept in a cave. Bhima was born on the same day on which Duryodhana was born thus making them of the same age. Arjuna, Nakula, and Sahadeva were born after Duryodhana was born.

== Children of Dhritarashtra ==
The children of Dhritarashtra by Gandhari are also referred by a more specific and frequently encountered term - Dhārtarāṣṭra, a derivative of Dhṛtarāṣṭra (Dhritarashtra).

According to the epic, Gandhari wanted a hundred sons and Vyasa granted her a boon that she would have these. Another version says that she was unable to have any children for a long time and she eventually became pregnant but did not deliver for two years, after which she gave birth to a lump of flesh. Vyasa cut this lump into a hundred and one-pieces and these eventually developed into a hundred boys and one girl.

The birth of these children is relevant to the dispute over the succession of the kingdom's throne. It attributes the late birth of Duryodhana, the eldest son of Dhritarashtra, despite his father's early marriage and legitimizes the case for his cousin Yudhishthira to claim the throne, since he could claim to be the eldest of his generation. There is an argument however that the Pandavas are all younger than Duryodhana, making him the true eldest. All the sons of Dhritarashtra (excluding Yuyutsu) were killed in the Battle of Kurukshetra.

== Names of the Kauravas ==
The Mahabharata itself provides the list of names in order of their birth when Kuru descendant Janamejaya inquires about the names. The following list has been adapted from Section 108.1 of the Adi Parva (Critical Edition):

1. Duryodhana
2. Duhshasana
3. Duhsaha
4. Duhshala
5. Jalasandha
6. Sama
7. Saha
8. Vinda
9. Anuvinda
10. Durdharsha
11. Subahu
12. Dushpradharshana
13. Durmarshana
14. Durmukha
15. Dushkarma
16. Karna
17. Vivimshati
18. Vikarna
19. Chitrasena
20. Sulochana
21. Chitra
22. Upachitra
23. Chitraksha
24. Charuchitra
25. Sharasana
26. Durmada
27. Dushpragaha
28. Vivitsu
29. Vikata
30. Urnanabha
31. Sunabha
32. Nanda
33. Upanandaka
34. Senapati
35. Sushena
36. Kundodara
37. Mahodara
38. Chitrabana
39. Chitravarma
40. Suvarma
41. Durvimochana
42. Ayobahu
43. Mahabahu
44. Chitranga
45. Chitrakundala
46. Bhimavega
47. Bhimabala
48. Balaki
49. Balavardhana
50. Ugrayudha
51. Bhimakarma
52. Kanakayu
53. Dridhayudha
54. Dridhavarma
55. Dridhakshatra
56. Somakirti
57. Anudara
58. Dridhasandha
59. Jarasandha
60. Satyasandha
61. Sadahsuvak
62. Ugrashrava
63. Ashvasena
64. Senani
65. Dushparajaya
66. Aparajita
67. Panditaka
68. Vishalaksha
69. Duravara
70. Dridhahasta
71. Suhasta
72. Vatavega
73. Suvarcha
74. Adityaketu
75. Bahvashi
76. Nagadanta
77. Ugrayayi
78. Kavachi
79. Nishangi
80. Pashi
81. Dandadhara
82. Dhanurgraha
83. Ugra
84. Bhimaratha
85. Vira
86. Virabahu
87. Alolupa
88. Abhaya
89. Roudrakarma
90. Dridharatha
91. Anadhrishya
92. Kundabhedi
93. Viravi
94. Dirghalochana
95. Dirghabahu
96. Mahabahu
97. Vyudhoru
98. Kanakadhvaja
99. Kundashi
100. Viraja

All, except Yuyutsu, were born to Dhritarashtra's queen Gandhari. The Kauravas also had a sister, Duhsala.

== Marriages and children of Kauravas ==
All the 100 Kauravas were mentioned to have wives in the Adi Parva.

== In literature ==
Harivamsa Purana (8th century CE) narrates the Jain version of their story.

== In popular culture ==
The term Kaurava is used as the name of a fictional planetary system in the 2008 real-time strategy video game Warhammer 40,000: Dawn of War – Soulstorm, as well as the names of the system's planets.

== See also ==
- Kuru kingdom
- Lunar dynasty
- Pandava
- Krishna

== Sources ==
- Mani, Vettam (1 January 2015). Puranic Encyclopedia: A Comprehensive Work with Special Reference to the Epic and Puranic Literature. Motilal Banarsidass. ISBN 978-81-208-0597-2.
- Sørensen, Søren (1904). An Index to the Names in the Mahabharata: With Short Explanations and a Concordance to the Bombay and Calcutta Editions and P. C. Roy's Translation. Williams & Norgate.
- McGrath, Kevin (16 May 2017). Raja Yudhisthira: Kingship in Epic Mahabharata. Cornell University Press. ISBN 978-1-5017-0821-3.
- James L. Fitzgerald (2004). The Mahabharata: The Book of the Women; The Book of Peace, Part One. Internet Archive. The University of Chicago Press. ISBN 978-0-226-25250-6.
- Buitenen, Johannes Adrianus Bernardus (1973a). The Mahābhārata. University of Chicago Press. ISBN 978-0-226-84663-7.
- Buitenen, J. A. B. van (1973b). The Mahabharata, Volume 3: Book 4: The Book of the Virata; Book 5: The Book of the Effort. University of Chicago Press. ISBN 978-0-226-84665-1.
- Singh, Upinder (2016), A History of Ancient and Early Medieval India: From the Stone Age to the 12th Century, Pearson Education, ISBN 978-93-325-6996-6
