= Dhritarashtra =

Kuru King and father of the Kauravas in the Indian epic Mahabharata

- Mahabharata character
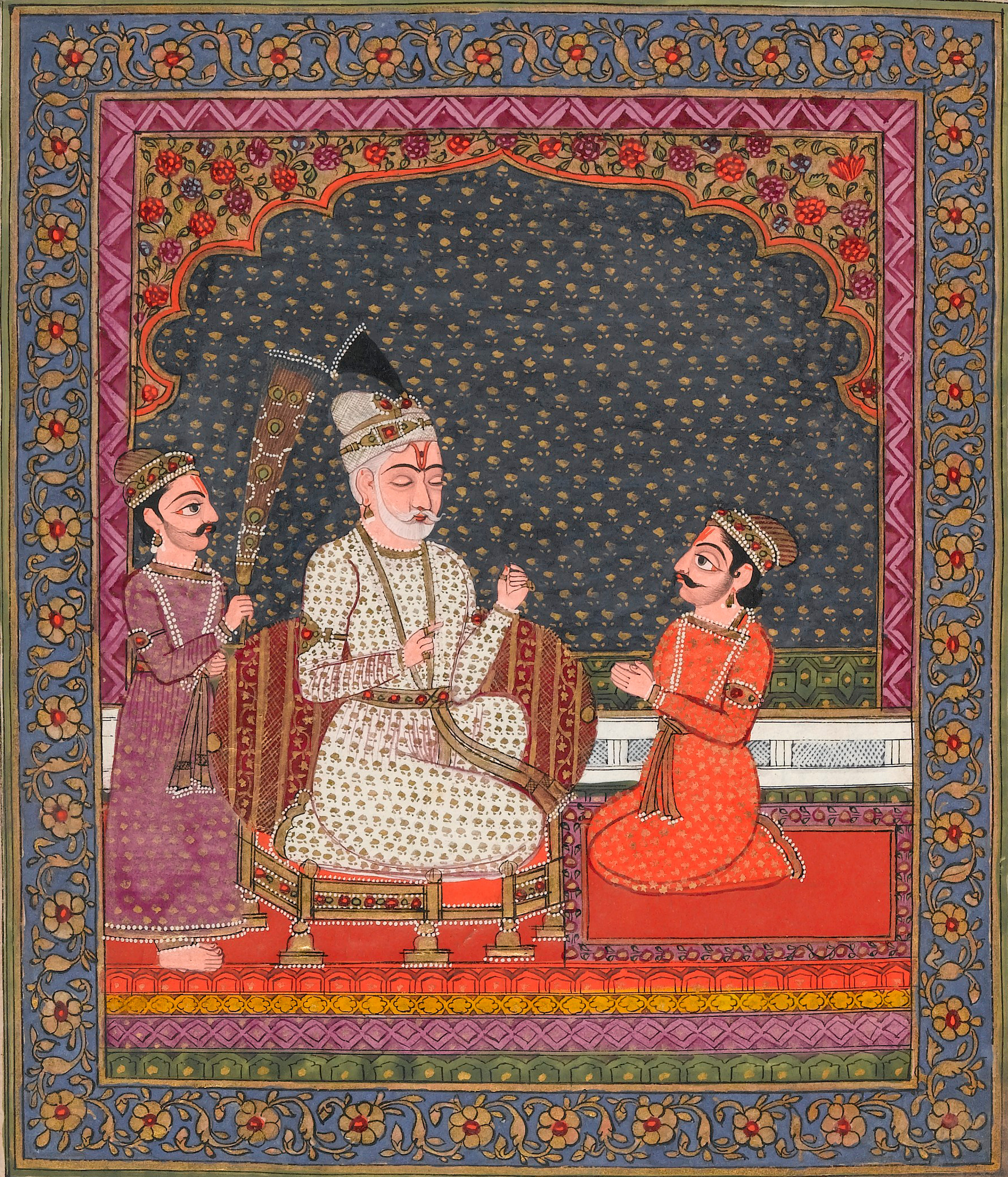
- The blind king Dhritarashtra listens as the visionary narrator Sanjaya relates the events of the battle between the Kaurava and the Pandava clans.

Information
- Title: King of Kuru Kingdom
- Affiliation: Kauravas
- Weapon: Gada
- Family: Vyasa (biological father); Ambalika (mother); Vichitravirya (legal father); Pandu (half-brother); Vidura (half-brother)
- Spouse: Gandhari
- Children: 100 Kauravas including; Duryodhana; Dushasana; Vikarna (sons); Dushala (daughter); Yuyutsu (son)
- Home: Kuru Kingdom
- Dynasty: Chandravamsha

Dhritarashtra (Sanskrit: धृतराष्ट्र, romanized: Dhṛtarāṣṭra) was a ruler of the ancient Kuru kingdom, featured as a central character in the Hindu epic Mahabharata. He is also attested in the Yajurveda, where he is acknowledged as the son of King Vichitravirya.

According to the Mahabharata, Dhritarashtra’s birth was the result of the ancient practice of Niyoga. After Vichitravirya died childless, his half-brother Vyasa fathered children with Vichitravirya’s widows to continue the Kuru lineage. Dhritarashtra was born blind to Vichitravirya’s elder queen, Ambika. Despite being the eldest, his blindness disqualified him from inheriting the throne, which passed to his younger half-brother, Pandu. However, after Pandu renounced the throne and retired to the forest, Dhritarashtra assumed kingship of the Kuru kingdom, albeit as a nominal ruler heavily influenced by his grandsire, Bhishma, and his eldest son, Duryodhana.

Dhritarashtra married Gandhari, a devoted wife who, in a gesture of solidarity, blindfolded herself for life to share in her husband's blindness. Together, they had one hundred sons, known as the Kauravas, and a daughter, Dushala. Throughout his reign, Dhritarashtra struggled with the conflicting roles of father and king. His deep affection for Duryodhana, often clouded his judgment, leading him to overlook his son's misdeeds and fail to curb the injustices inflicted upon their cousins, the Pandavas. His hundred sons, led by Duryodhana, became the antagonists in the Mahabharata, opposing the Pandavas in the Kurukshetra War. Dhritarashtra also fathered a son, Yuyutsu, through a maid, who later sided with the Pandavas during the war.

During the Kurukshetra War, Dhritarashtra depended on his charioteer Sanjaya, who had divine vision, to learn about the entire details of the war, the deaths of the prominent warriors, and the profound teachings of the Bhagavad Gita. After the war, which resulted in the fall of the Kauravas, a grief-stricken Dhritarashtra withdrew to the forest with Gandhari, Kunti, and Vidura. He spent his final years in asceticism and meditation, ultimately dying in a forest fire, attaining liberation.

== Etymology and historicity ==
Dhṛtarāṣṭra means "He who supports/bears the nation".

A historical Kuru King named Dhr̥tarāṣṭra Vaicitravīrya is mentioned in the Kāṭhaka Saṃhitā of the Yajurveda (c. 1200–900 BCE) as a descendant of the Rigvedic-era King Sudas of the Bharatas. His cattle were reportedly destroyed as a result of the conflict with the vrātya ascetics; however, this Vedic mention does not provide corroboration for the accuracy of the Mahabharata's account of his reign. Dhritarashtra did not accept the vratyas into his territory, and with the aid of rituals, the vratyas destroyed his cattle. The group of vratyas were led by Vaka Dālbhi of Panchala.

== Birth and early life ==
With Vichitravirya having died of sickness, Bhishma unable to take the throne because of his vow, and Bahlika's line unwilling to leave the Bahlika Kingdom, there was a succession crisis in Hastinapura. Satyavati invited her son Vyasa to impregnate the queens Ambika and Ambalika under the Niyoga practice. When Vyasa went to impregnate Ambika, his appearance was scary and frightened her, so she closed her eyes during their union; hence her son was born blind.

Dhritarashtra, along with his younger half-brother Pandu, was trained in the military arts by Bhishma and Kripacharya. Hindered by his handicap, Dhritarashtra was unable to wield weapons, but had the strength of one hundred thousand elephants due to a boon given by Vyasa, and was said to be so strong that he could crush iron with his bare hands. When it came time to nominate an heir, Vidura suggested that Pandu would be a better fit because he was not blind. Though bitter about losing his birthright, Dhritarashtra willingly conceded the crown, though this act would seep into the obsession he would have over his crown later in life. Dhritarashtra married Gandhari of Hastinapura's weakened and lowly vassal Gandhara; After their marriage, Gandhari covered her eyes with a blindfold in order to truly experience her husband's blindness. Gandhari and he had one hundred sons, called the Kauravas, and one daughter Dushala. He also had a son named Yuyutsu mothered by a maid.

== Reign ==
After the incident with Rishi Kindama, Pandu retired to the forest. Hence, Dhritarashtra was offered the crown. Through the blessings of Vyasa, he and Gandhari had one hundred sons and a daughter, with his eldest son, Duryodhana, becoming his heir. Upon Duryodhana's birth, ill omens appeared; many sages and priests advised Dhritarashtra and Gandhari to abandon the baby. But they refused to do so; Duryodhana grew up with a princely education and his parents believed that he would be a great heir.

However, when Pandu died, Kunti and her sons returned to Hastinapura, living alongside Dhritarashtra's children. Yudhishthira, Pandu's eldest son, was older than Duryodhana. Given that Pandu was the king and that Yudhishthira was the son of the god of Dharma (Dharmaraja, also known as Yama) he had a strong claim to the throne. A succession crisis began; though recognising Yudhishthira's merits, Dhritarashtra favoured his own son, blinded by affection. Upon much pressure from the Brahmins, Vidura, and Bhishma, Dhritarashtra reluctantly named Yudhishthira as his heir.

=== Bifurcation of the Kuru Kingdom ===
After the House of Lac incident, in which the Pandavas are believed to have been immolated, Dhritarashtra mourns, but was able to finally name Duryodhana as his heir. When the Pandavas are revealed to have survived, Duryodhana refuses to cede his title as heir when the sour relations between the Kauravas and the Pandavas simmer. On Bhishma's advice, Dhritarashtra bifurcates the kingdom, giving Hastinapura to Duryodhana and Khandavaprastha to Yudhishthira.

=== The game of dice ===
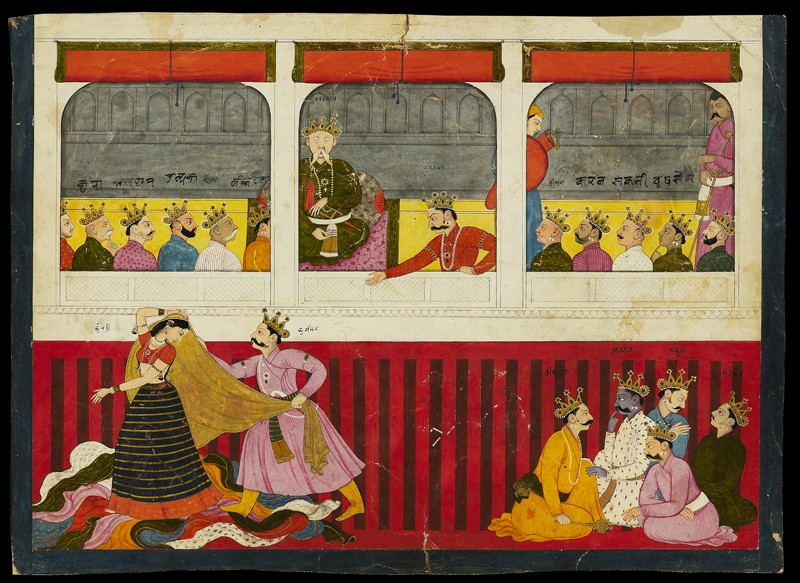
Draupadi disrobed in Dhritarashtra's assembly. Dhritarashtra seated in the centre.

Shakuni, Gandhari's brother, was a master of dice as he could load them without his opponents having a clue. He, along with his nephew Duryodhana, conspired in a game of dice and invited the Pandavas to gamble. The Pandavas eventually lost their kingdom, wealth, and prestige and were exiled for thirteen years. Draupadi, the wife of the Pandavas, was humiliated in court after Dushasana tried to disrobe her. The blind king only intervened after counselling with Gandhari when Draupadi was going to curse the Kuru dynasty. Though notables like Vikarna and Vidura objected to the sins of Duryodhana, most of the spectators were helpless due to their obligations to Hastinapura; Dhritarashtra could have spoken out, but did not.

== The Kurukshetra War ==
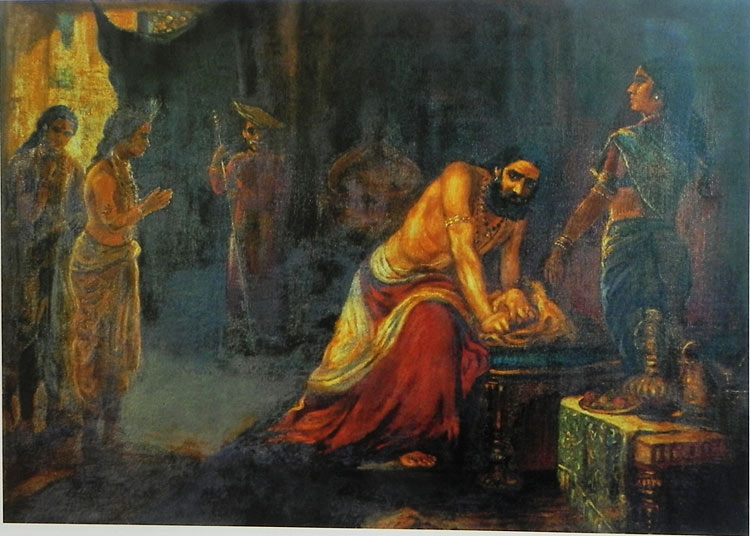
Krishna requests Dhritarashtra to avoid war.

Krishna, as a peace emissary of the Pandavas, travelled to Hastinapura to persuade the Kauravas to avoid the bloodshed of their own descendants. However, Duryodhana conspired to arrest him, which resulted in the failure of the mission. After Krishna's peace mission failed and a war seemed inevitable, Vyasa approached Dhritarashtra and offered to grant him a divine vision so that Dhritarashtra could see the war. However, not willing to see his kin slaughtered, Dhritarashtra asked that the boon be given to Sanjaya, his charioteer. Sanjaya dutifully narrated the war to his liege, reporting how Bhima killed all his children. Sanjaya would console the blind king while challenging the king with his own viewpoints and morals. When Lord Krishna displayed his Vishvarupa (True form) to Arjuna on the battlefield of Kurukshetra, Dhritarashtra regretted not possessing the divine sight.

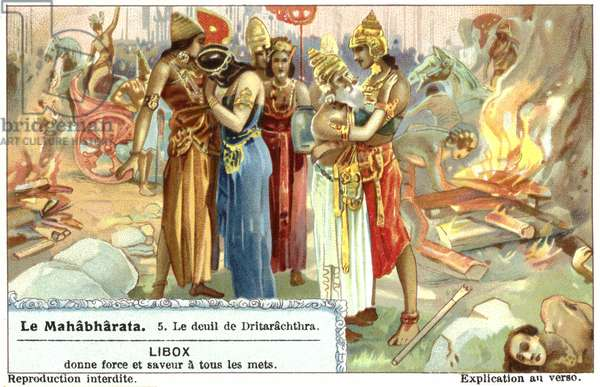
Dhritarashtra mourns the death of his sons.

Dhritarashtra was confident that Bhishma, Drona, Karna and the other invincible warriors would make the Kaurava camp victorious. He rejoiced whenever the tide of war turned against the Pandavas. However, the results of the war devastated him. All of his sons and grandsons but one were killed in the carnage. Dhritarashtra's only daughter Duhsala was widowed. Yuyutsu had defected to Pandava side at the onset of the war, and was the only son of Dhritarashtra who had managed to survive the Kurukshetra War.

=== Crushing of Bhima's metal statue ===
After the war ended, the victorious Pandavas arrived at Hastinapura for the formal transfer of power. The Pandavas set forth to embrace their uncle and offer him their respects. Dhritarashtra hugged Yudhishthira heartily without a grudge. When Dhritarashtra turned to Bhima, Krishna sensed his intentions and asked Bhima to step back and placed Bhima's iron statue in his place. Dhritarashtra crushed the statue into pieces and then broke down crying, his rage leaving him. Broken and defeated, Dhritarashtra apologised for his folly and wholeheartedly embraced Bhima and the other Pandavas.

== Later years and death ==
15 years after the great war of Mahabharata, the grief-stricken blind king along with his wife Gandhari, sister-in-law Kunti, and half brother Vidura left Hastinapura for penance. It is believed that all of them (except Vidura who predeceased him) perished in a forest fire and attained moksha.

== Assessment ==
Throughout his reign as King of Hastinapura, Dhritarashtra was torn between the principles of dharma and his love for his son Duryodhana. He often ended up endorsing his son's actions merely out of fatherly love.

Dhritarashtra is physically strong, yet psychologically weak, easily manipulated by his brother-in-law, Shakuni. Dhritarashtra appears in Mahabharata sections that have been circulated as separate scriptures, most notably the Bhagavad Gita, whose dialogue was narrated to him.

== See also ==
- Gandhari (character)
- Kauravas
- Duryodhana
- Historicity of the Mahabharata
- Shakuni
