= James L. Fitzgerald =

American Indologist

James L. Fitzgerald is an American Indologist at Brown University. He studied at the University of Chicago, receiving his B.A. in 1971, his M.A. in Sanskrit in 1974 and his Ph.D. in Sanskrit and South Asian Civilizations in 1980. At Chicago he studied primarily with J. A. B. van Buitenen. From 1978 Fitzgerald joined the Department of Religious Studies at the University of Tennessee. In 2007 he was appointed Purandara Das Distinguished Professor of Sanskrit in the Department of Classics, Brown University.

Fitzgerald's main research interest has been India's great Sanskrit epic, the Mahābhārata.

== Publications ==
=== Books ===
The Mahabharata: Book 11: The Book of the Women, Book 12: The Book of Peace, Part One. Translated, edited, and annotated by James L. Fitzgerald. 848 p., 1 halftone, 1 map, 4 charts, 7 tables. Chicago: University of Chicago Press, 2004.

==== In progress ====
The Mahabharata: Book 12: The Book of Peace, Part Two. Translated, edited, and annotated by James L. Fitzgerald. Chicago: University of Chicago.

=== Other projects ===
1981 Edited the posthumous publication of J. A. B. van Buitenen’s The Bhagavad Gītā in the Mahābhārata (Chicago: University of Chicago Press, 1981).

=== Articles ===
In press, 2009 “The Sāṃkhya-Yoga “Manifesto” at MBh 12.289-290,” in proceedings of the 13th World Sanskrit Conference, John Brockington, ed. (Delhi: Motilal Banarsidass): 185-212.

In press, 2009 “A Preliminary Study of the 681 Triṣṭubh Passages of the Mahābhārata,” in proceedings of the 12th World Sanskrit Conference, Robert Goldman and Muneo Tokunaga, editors (Delhi: Motilal Banarsidass, in press): 95-117.

In press, 2009 “No Contest between Memory and Invention: The Invention of the Pāṇḍava Heroes of the Mahābhārata,” in the proceedings volume of the conference “Epic and History: Ancient and Medieval,” Brown University, December, 2006.

2007 “Bhīṣma beyond Freud: The Fall of the Sky, Bhīṣma in the Mahābhārata, 1,” in Epic Constructions: Gender, Myth, and Society in the Mahābhārata, edited by Brian Black and Simon Brodbeck (London: Routledge, 2007): 189-207.

2006 “Negotiating the Shape of ‘Scripture’: New Perspectives on the Development and Growth of the Epic Between the Empires,” in Between the Empires, edited by Patrick Olivelle (Oxford: Oxford University Press, 2006): 257-87.

2006 “Toward a Database of the Non-Anuṣṭubh Verses of the Mahābhārata,” in Epics, Khilas, and Purāṇas: Continuities and Ruptures, Petteri Koskikallio, ed., Proceedings of the Third Dubrovnik International Conference on the Sanskrit Epics and Purāṇas (Zagreb: Croatian Academy of Sciences and Arts, 2006): 137-148.

2004 “Dharma and Its Translation in the Mahābhārata,” Journal of Indian Philosophy 32.5 (Dec. 2004): 671-685.

2003 “The Many Voices of the Mahābhārata:” A Review Article of Rethinking the Mahābhārata: A Reader's Guide to the Education of the Dharma King by Alf Hiltebeitel (Chicago: University Of Chicago Press, 2001), Journal of The American Oriental Society 123.4 (2003): 803-18.

2004 “Mahābhārata,” in The Hindu World, Sushil Mittal and Gene Thursby, eds. (New York and London: Routledge, 2004): 52-74.

2002 “Nun Befuddles King, Shows karmayoga Does Not Work: Sulabhā’s Refutation of King Janaka at MBh 12.308,” Journal of Indian Philosophy 30.6 (December, 2002): 641-77.

2002 “The Rāma Jāmadagnya Thread of the Mahābhārata: A New Survey of Rāma Jāmadagnya in the Pune Text,” in Mary Brockington, ed., Stages and Transitions: Temporal and Historical Frameworks in Epic and Purāṇic Literature, Proceedings of the Second Dubrovnik International Conference on the Sanskrit Epics and Purāṇas, August, 1999 (Zagreb, Croatian Academy of Sciences and Arts, 2002): 89-132.

2002 “Making Yudhiṣṭhira the King: The Dialectics and the Politics of Violence in the Mahābhārata,” Rocznik Orientalistyczny LIV (2001): 63-92.

2000 “pīta and śaikya/saikya: Two Terms of Iron and Steel Technology in the Mahābhārata,” Journal of the American Oriental Society, 120.1 (January–March 2000): 44-61.

1998 “Some Storks and Eagles Eat Carrion; Herons and Ospreys Do Not: Kaṅkas and Kuraras (and Baḍas) in the Mahābhārata,” Journal of the American Oriental Society, 118.2 (April–June 1998): 257-61.

1993 Articles on dharma, śānti, and Vyāsa in the Harper Dictionary of Religion (New York: Harper and Row, 1993).

1987. “Book Review: The Mahabharata: A Play Based Upon the Indian Classic Epic.” Soundings: An Interdisciplinary Journal 70 (3–4): 539–51.

1985 “India’s Fifth Veda: The Mahābhārata’s Presentation of Itself,” Journal of South Asian Literature, XX.1 (1985): 125-40. Reprinted in Essays on the Mahābhārata, edited by Arvind Sharma (Leiden: E. J. Brill, 1991): 150-71.

1983 “The Great Epic of India as Religious Rhetoric: A Fresh Look at the Mahābhārata,” Journal of the American Academy of Religion, LI.4 (December, 1983): 611-630.

1978 Annotated translation of Ṛgveda I.113, in Appendix I of The Meaning of Aphrodite, Paul Friedrich (Chicago: University of Chicago Press, 1978).
