= Karna Parva =

Eighth book of the Mahabharata

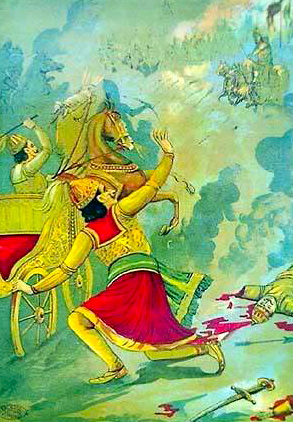
Death of Karna

The Karna Parva (Sanskrit: कर्ण पर्व) ("Book of Karna") is the eighth of the eighteen parvas (books) of the Indian epic Mahabharata. Karna Parva traditionally has 96 chapters. The critical edition of Karna Parv has 69 chapters

Karna Parva describes the appointment of Karna as the third commander-in-chief of the Kaurava alliance. The Parva recites how war begins to tire and frustrate everyone. This book describes how brutal war leads to horrifying behavior over the 16th and 17th day of the 18-day Kurukshetra War.

Karna Parva includes a treatise by Aswatthama which focuses on the motive of the deeds of human life. The crowning incident of this Parva is the final confrontation between Karna and Arjuna, in which Karna is killed.

== Structure and chapters ==
The Karna Parva traditionally has 2 upa-parvas (parts, little books) and 96 adhyayas (chapters).

=== Karna Parva (chapters: 1–56) ===
16th day of war

After learning of the deceptive way his father was killed, Ashwatthama became filled with wrath and invoked the celestial weapon called the Narayanastra, against the Pandavas. When the weapon was invoked, violent winds began to blow, peals of thunder are heard, and an arrow pierced every Pandava soldier. This had put fear into the Pandava army, but Krishna by stopping the troops advised that the army lay down all its weapons and surrender to the weapon. As himself being the incarnation of Narayana, he knew about the weapon, as the weapon only targets an armed person while ignoring unarmed ones. After getting their soldiers to disarm (including Bhima with some difficulty), the astra passed by harmlessly. Narayanastra failed to harm Krishna as he himself is an incarnation of Narayana. When urged by Duryodhana to use the weapon again, desirous of victory, Aswatthama sadly responded that if the weapon is used again, it would turn on its user. Narayanastra destroyed one Akshauhini of Pandava army completely. After the use of Narayanastra, a terrible war between both armies took place. Ashvatthama defeated Dhrishtadyumna in direct combat, but failed to kill him as Satyaki covered his retreat.

On 16th day of war, Karna was appointed as a commander-in-chief for the Kaurava Army.

By using an ordinary bow Ashwatthama fired millions of arrows at a time which resulted in the stupefaction of Arjuna himself. Then after some time he again overpowered Arjuna as Lord Krishna and Arjuna were bathed in blood but at last Arjuna pierced his steeds and steeds carried Ashwatthama away and also his weapons were exhausted.

King Malayadhwaja of Pandya Kingdom was one of the mightiest warrior of Pandavas and on that day he fought brilliantly against Ashwatthama. After a long duel of Archery between them Ashwatthama made Malayadhwaja carless, weaponless and had obtained an opportunity to kill him on the spot but he spared him temporarily for more fight.Then Malayadhwaja proceeded against Ashwatthama on an elephant and sped a powerful lance which destroyed latter’s diadem.Then Ashwathama cut off the head and arms of Malayadhwaja and also killed 6 followers of Malayadhwaja. All the great warriors of Kauravas then applauded him for his act.

Then Bhima headed to kill Dussasana. Bhima engaged in duel with Dushasana. First they fought by means of archery. Bhima broke Dushasana's bow. Dushasana took sword, Bhima cut off sword. Bhima cut all weapons in similar manner till Dushasana took mace. When Dushasana took up mace, Bhima also took his mace. Soon both started mace duel with each other. Bhima beat Dushasana many times with his mace. Bhima broke Dushyasana's mace. Both of them began wrestling. Finally Bhima defeated and brutally killed Dussasana in front of Duryodhana. Bhima killed Dussashana by separating and detaching his hands from the body. Bhima beat Dussashana in heart region. Bhima squeezed blood from Dussasana's heart and dressed Draupadi's hair. Bhima also drank off remaining blood and fulfilled his oath.

Meanwhile Karna wreaking the havoc among Pandava Army. Many of the warriors running away from the wrath of Karna. Karna countered the attacks of Pandava soldiers and then started again destroying the Pandava's troops. Nakula, Sahadeva, Satyaki and Draupadeyas attacked Karna but defeated them. Nakula engaged the battle with Karna however Karna defeated him and destroyed his chariot but spared him.

Duryodhana and Yudhisthira engaged in the battle. Although Duryodhana showed his might, Yudhisthira defeated him. Kripa, Karna, Ashwatthama come to rescue Duryodhana. Ashwatthama defeated Yudhisthira and Satyaki come to attack Ashwatthama. When Satyaki broken the Ashwatthama's bow, Karna attacked Satyaki, although Satyaki gave a tough fight, Karna defeats him. To save Satyaki, Arjuna attacked Karna, overpowers him and was applauded.

=== Karna-vadha Parva (chapters: 57–96) ===
17th day of war

In very early hours, after the sunrise; Trigartas and Samsaptakas engaged fight with Arjuna. Arjuna began to sweep the armies. Arjuna used his Nagastra. Then Partha slew them with his straight arrows. Indeed, all these warriors in that battle, aiming at whom Partha had invoked that foot-tying weapon, had their lower limbs encircled with snakes. Then Susharma countered with his Sauparna astra. Thereupon numerous birds began to come down and devour those snakes. There was no man amongst them that could fight with Arjuna. Arjuna began to destroy all the troops. Beholding that slaughter, all of them remained perfectly inactive, without putting forth their prowess. Arjuna slew all Sampsaptakas and Trigartas. Arjun also killed King Susharma. Arjuna slayed 100,000 warriors. When Arjuna was involved in fight with Samsaptakas, Karna defeated the Pandava brothers Nakula, Sahadeva and Yudhishthira in battle but spared their lives as per promise he made to Kunti. Karna along with his son Vrishasena began slaying armies of Pandavas. Arjuna came into the place where Karna and Vrishasena were creating havocs. Karna was earlier involved in the killing of an unarmed Abhimanyu on the thirteenth day of the battle. First, Karna broke Abhimanyu's bow and then finally stabbed Abhimanyu along with other warriors. Remembering the unjustified death of his son, Arjuna took revenge by killing Vrishasena. Karna became inconsolable after seeing his son's fate. He engaged a long duel with Arjuna. The much anticipated battle between Arjuna and Karna took place fiercely. Karna began coming forward but then Karna's chariot wheel was trapped in the mud as a result of the curse he had received earlier from goddess Earth. At the crucial moment, he forgot the incantations to invoke Brahmastra, as a result of his guru Parashurama's curse. Karna got down from his chariot to free the wheel and asked Arjuna to pause, reminding him of the etiquette of war. But Krishna spurred Arjuna to attack Karna reminding the way Karna killed Abhimanyu by stabbing him from behind- which are against the rules of engagement of the war. Being spurred by Krishna, then Arjuna used Anjalikastra to kill Karna which decapitated him, leading to his death. Arjuna had to kill Karna in such a kind of situation only because Karna had banes from Goddess Earth and poor brahmin. Earth Goddess cursed Karna that his chariot wheel gets struck in land which will lead to his death and a saint cursed Karna that Karna would die when he is weaponless as Karna killed his cow when it was helpless. In order to fulfill curses, Krishna spurred Arjuna to kill Karna in that situation.

== Telugu translation ==
Karna Parva was composed in Sanskrit. Several translations of the book in English are available. Two translations from the 19th century, now in public domain, are those by Kisari Mohan Ganguli and Manmatha Nath Dutt. The translations vary with each translator's interpretations.

Clay Sanskrit Library has published a 15 volume set of the Mahabharata which includes a translation of Karna Parva by Adam Bowles. This translation is modern and uses an old manuscript of the Epic.

== Quotations and teachings ==
Karna Parva, Chapter 6:

Passion, engagement, skill and policy - these are the means to accomplish objectives.

— Ashwatthama, Karna Parva, Mahabharata Book viii.6

Karna Parva, Chapter 69:

Many people maintain that morality can be learned from the scriptures alone; I do not find fault with that, but then everything is not provided in the scriptures.
Moral precepts have been made for the well bring of all creatures.
Moral precepts have been made to free the creatures from all injuries.
Dharma - morality - is so called because it protects all. Morality saves all creatures. That is moral that keeps creatures from injuries.
An untruth spoken to save creatures from injuries is in the cause of morality, and does not amount to a falsehood.

— Krishna, Karna Parva, Mahabharata Book viii.69.56-66

== See also ==
- Previous book of Mahabharata: Drona Parva
- Next book of Mahabharata: Shalya Parva
