= Chitrasena (gandharva) =

Celestial being in Hindu mythology

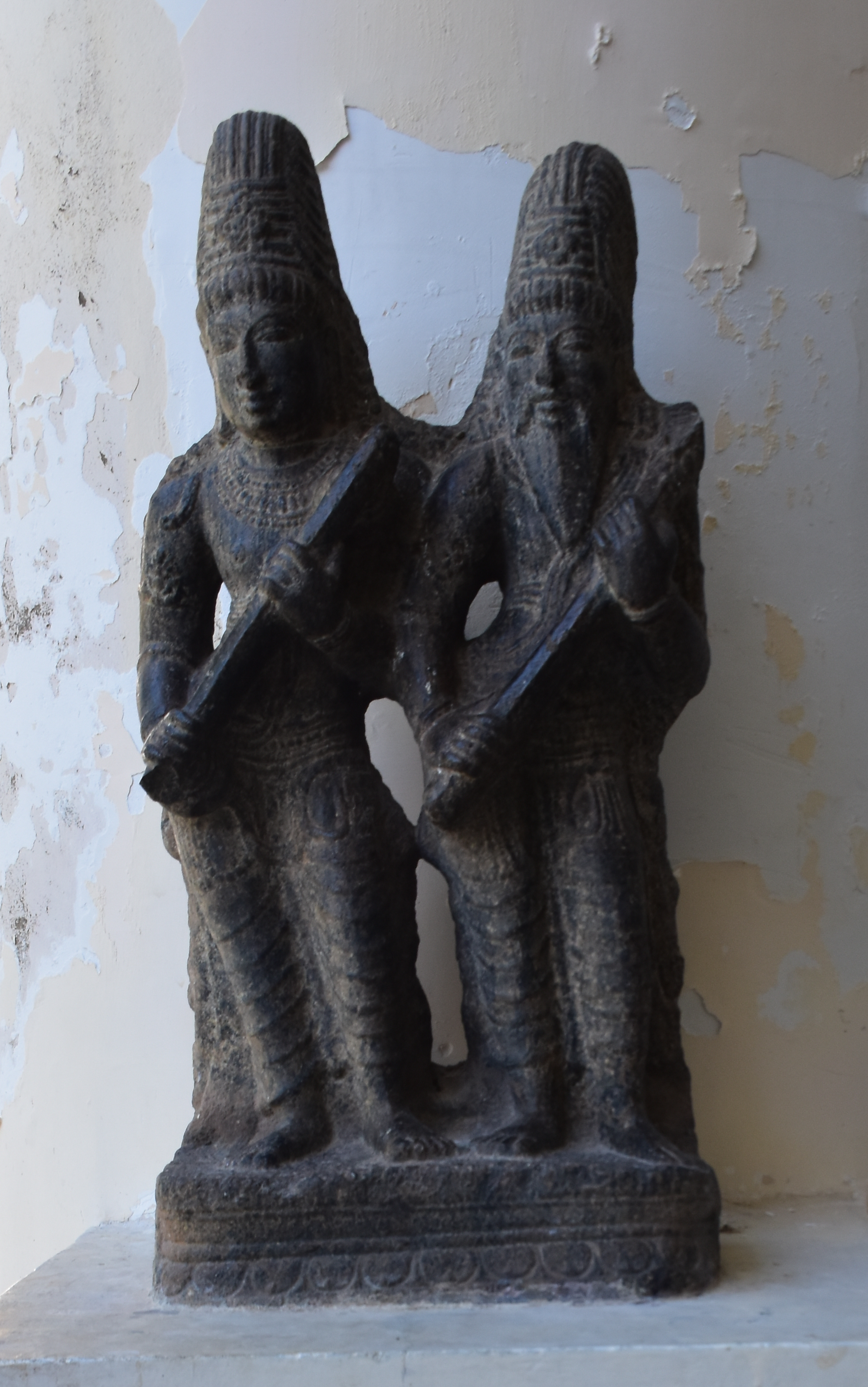
- Sculpture of Chitrasena and the divine sage Narada, both holding lute
- Affiliation: Gandharva
- Abode: Svarga
- Battles: Ghoshayatra battle
- Texts: Mahabharata, Puranas
- Gender: Male

Genealogy
- Parents: Vishvavasu (father)
- Spouse: Sandhyavali and Ratnavali
- Children: Patreshvara

Chitrasena (Sanskrit: चित्रसेन, romanized: Citrasena) is a prominent Gandharva king in Hindu mythology. He is primarily featured in the Mahabharata, known for his mastery of music and dance. The son of the Gandharva Vishvavasu, Chitrasena is closely associated with the courts of the gods Indra and Kubera. He plays a significant role in instructing music to the hero Arjuna during his visit to Indra's abode. Chitrasena is also noted for his martial prowess, confronting and defeating the entire Kaurava army during the Pandavas’ exile. Chitrasena's mythology is further expanded in Puranic literature.

== In the Mahabharata ==
The Vana Parva mentions Chitrasena as the son of the most prominent gandharva, Vishvavasu. According to Sabha Parva, Chitrasena holds a prominent position in the assemblies of Indra, the king of the gods, where he plays music for entertainment. Chitrasena is also described as a member of Kubera’s court. During Rajasuya yajna, Chitrasena occupied a seat in the court of King Yudhishthira, along with twenty-seven other Gandharvas and several Apsaras.

According to Vana Parva, during the Pandavas’ 13 year long exile, Arjuna was invited to Indra’s realm (devaloka), where Chitrasena taught him the arts of music and dance. A myth, rejected in the Critical Edition, adds that during his stay, Arjuna also encountered the Apsara Urvashi, whose romantic advances he rejected. In response, she cursed him to live as an eunuch for a period, a curse that Chitrasena helped mitigate by relaying a message from Indra to console Arjuna.

Chitrasena plays a pivotal role in an altercation with Duryodhana, which occurs during the latter's Ghoshayatra while the Pandavas are in their final year of exile in the Dvaitavana forest. According to the narrative, Duryodhana, desiring to display his opulence before the exiled Pandavas, instructed his men to build pleasure houses near a lake in the forest. However, as his soldiers approached the lakeside, they encountered Chitrasena, who was accompanied by other Gandharvas and Apsaras. Chitrasena declared that the lake and surrounding woodland belonged to him and forbade Duryodhana’s men from entering. When the soldiers relayed Chitrasena’s message to Duryodhana, he, angered by the refusal, ordered his generals to drive the Gandharvas away. Chitrasena, however, mocked Duryodhana’s arrogance, warning that challenging celestial beings would lead to disaster. Ignoring Chitrasena’s warning, Duryodhana sent his army to attack the Gandharvas. In the ensuing battle, Chitrasena and his forces overpowered the Kaurava soldiers using mayastra. Eventually, Chitrasena captured Duryodhana, his brothers, and their wives, binding them and taking them prisoner. Some of Duryodhana’s men fled to Yudhishthira’s camp, pleading for help. Although Bhima initially mocked Duryodhana’s misfortune, Yudhishthira emphasized the importance of family honor and ordered Arjuna, Bhima, Nakula, and Sahadeva to rescue their cousins. A fierce battle followed, during which Arjuna’s celestial weapons decimated the Gandharva forces. During the battle, Chitrasena revealed his identity to Arjuna, explaining that he had captured Duryodhana on Indra’s command to punish the prince for his arrogance and malicious intent toward the Pandavas. Arjuna, however, requested Chitrasena to release the Kauravas, citing Yudhishthira’s instructions and the value of mercy. Chitrasena complied, freeing Duryodhana and his retinue.

== Puranas ==
In addition to his role in the Mahabharata, Chitrasena is also mentioned in various Puranas, where additional details about his life and relationships are provided. According to these texts, Chitrasena had two wives, Sandhyavali and Ratnavali. One Puranic story recounts a serious conflict involving Chitrasena, and the sage Galava. While Chitrasena was traveling in his aerial chariot with his wives, Sandhyavali and Ratnavali, he accidentally spat, and his spittle fell on the sage Galava, who was performing his sandhya rites (rituals performed during twilight). Angered by the insult, Galava complained to Krishna, who vowed to bring Chitrasena’s head before sunset. This vow alarmed Chitrasena when he learned of it from Sage Narada. Fearing for his life, Chitrasena, along with his wives, sought refuge. In desperation, Sandhyavali and Ratnavali approached Subhadra, Arjuna’s wife, for help. They dug a fire pit in front of her house and prepared to end their lives alongside Chitrasena by jumping into the flames.

As Chitrasena circled the fire-pit, preparing for the ritual, his wives wept loudly. Hearing their cries, Subhadra came outside and intervened. The distressed wives begged Subhadra for a boon, requesting that they be allowed to live with their husband. Moved by their plea, Subhadra granted the boon before fully understanding the situation. When Subhadra realized that Krishna had vowed to kill Chitrasena, she found herself in a dilemma. Arjuna, however, stepped in and promised to protect Chitrasena at all costs. A fierce battle ensued between Krishna and Arjuna, as Arjuna defended Chitrasena by deflecting Krishna’s arrows. As tensions escalated, Subhadra intervened, stepping between Krishna and Arjuna and preventing them from continuing the fight.To resolve the situation, Krishna advised Chitrasena to apologize to Sage Galava. Chitrasena obeyed, humbly bowing and touching the sage’s feet. Pleased with his repentance, Galava forgave him, and the conflict was peacefully settled without further harm to any party.

According to the Skanda Purana, Chitrasena had a son named Patreshvara, who is described as the most handsome of all Gandharvas.

== In Buddhism ==
Chitrasena is explained in the Atanatiya Sutta as one of the gandharvas that a practitioner of Buddhism can call upon in need of protection from demonic forces.
