= Agneyastra =

Celestial weapon of Hindu fire god Agni

Agneyastra (Sanskrit: आग्नेयास्त्र, romanized: Āgneyāstra, lit. 'Astra of Fire/Agni') (Note: In a modern context, āgneyāstra (आग्नेयास्त्र) is the word for "firearm" in Hindi.) is the signature celestial weapon (astra) of the Hindu god of fire, Agni, which is featured in Sanskrit epics like the Ramayana and Mahabharata, where it is invoked by many notable warrior-heroes such as Arjuna or Ashwatthama.

== Description ==
In classical texts, Agneyastra—like most astra—is said to take the form of a non-edged projectile weapon like a missile/rocket, javelin, or arrow/bolt. When discharged, it is said to emit flames inextinguishable through mundane means, and to unleash firepower equivalent to hundreds or even thousands of flaming arrows, thus being effective against entire legions of men. Due to its fiery nature, it can be countered by an enemy's invocation of the water-based Varunastra.

== Literature ==
=== Ramayana ===
In the Ramayana, the Agneyastra was wielded by Lakshmana and countered by Atikaya's invocation of Suryastra, leading to them being mutually burned.

=== Mahabharata ===
One legend of the Mahabharata, tells of Arjuna using the Agneyastra against Angaraparna, chief of the Gandharvas, on the banks of the river Ganges, with Arjuna specifically managing to slay "ten hundreds of thousands" of Gandharvas. Arjuna had been bestowed the fire astra by Drona, who had received it from Agnivesha, who in turn had been given the weapon by Bharadvaja, and who himself had received it from Brihaspati.

The sage Aurva also offered the Agneyastra to Sagara.

During the Kurukshetra war, Ashwatthama summoned the Agneyastra to reduce a whole akshauhini of soldiers, horses, chariots, and elephants to ashes, before the weapon was neutralized by Arjuna's use of Varunastra.

== See also ==
- Astra (weapon)
- Varunastra
- Suryastra
- Indrastra
