= Chitraratha =

Gandharva in Hindu mythology

- Other names: Angaraparna
- Affiliation: Gandharvas
- Weapons: Bow and arrows, Agneyastra
- Symbols: Chariot
- Texts: Atharvaveda, Mahabharata, Ramayana, Puranas

Genealogy
- Parents: Suryavarchas (according to Atharvaveda); Kashyapa and Muni (according to the Mahabharata)
- Siblings: Vasuruchi (brother)
- Consort: Kumbhinasi

Chitraratha (Sanskrit: चित्ररथ, romanized: Citraratha), also known as Angaraparna (Sanskrit: अङ्गारपर्ण, romanized: Aṅgāraparṅa), is a prominent Gandharva—a class of celestial musicians in Hindu mythology. Although he is first mentioned in the Atharvaveda, Chitraratha is primarily known for his role in the epic Mahabharata, where he encounters the Pandava brothers.

Identified as a king of the Gandharvas, Chitraratha confronts the Pandavas during their journey through his forest to the city of the Panchalas and forbids them from entering the area. This results in a direct battle between him and the third Pandava prince, Arjuna. Although Chitraratha is defeated, his life is spared after the pleadings of his wife, Kumbhinasi. Following this, Chitraratha befriends Arjuna, gifting him the knowledge of the Chakshushi Vidya and celestial horses. He also narrates the legends of Arjuna's ancestors and advises the Pandavas to appoint the ascetic Dhaumya as their family priest. In return, Chitraratha receives the Agneyastra weapon from Arjuna.

== In Vedic texts ==
The gandharva Chitraratha first appears within a hymn (8.10.27) in the book 8 of the Atharva Veda dedicated to the glorification of Viraj—the divine cosmic cow whose milk nourishes every class of existence according to its nature. It describes how the gandharvas and apsarases call upon the Viraj, addressing her as Punyagandha. Chitraratha, mentioned as a son of Suryavarcas, becomes the calf of the Viraj to induce milk secretion, while Vasuruchi, another son of Suryavarcas, acts as the milker. The milk is drawn into a lotus-petal pail (or lotus leaf). From this divine milking emerges the "most delightful fragrance" — the holy scent upon which the Gandharvas and Apsarasas subsist.

This myth becomes the basis for the 'Milking of the Earth' episode narrated in the Mahabharata (c 400 BCE) and various Puranic texts (mostly composed after 400 CE), where King Prithu tames the Earth in the form of a cow and extracts various treasures as milk. Chitraratha's role as the calf remains consistent in these accounts, except in the Bhagavata Purana, where Vishvavasu acts as the calf instead.

== In the Epics ==
The Adi Parva of the Mahabharata mentions Chitraratha among the sixteen sons of the proginator sage, Kashyapa, and his wife Muni. His original name is mentioned as Angaraparna, which he changed to Chitraratha. Among the gandharvas, Chitraratha holds a high position, identified as a Devagandharva (lit. Divine gandharva) and is described being all wise and self-controlled. He is the mentioned as the foremost among all the gandharva by the god Krishna during the Bhagavad Gita episode. He is regarded as a follower of the god Indra and a close friend of the god Kubera.

According to the Ramayana, he named prince Rama's charioteer. In the Mahabharata, even before his encounter, Chitraratha, along with all the prominent gandharvas, was present during the birth celebration of the epic's hero Arjuna.

Across the epics, Chitraratha is also famous for the park he created, called Chaitraratha (lit. ‘belonging to Chitraratha). The Ramayana mentions it being owned by both Indra and Kubera, while the Mahabharata assigns it only to Kubera. The park is noted for its beautiful and scenic landscape, making it a popular spot for pilgrims, as well as the place where the king Yayati enjoyed his sexual dalliances with the nymph Vishvachi.

=== Encounter with the Pandavas ===
The most famous incident featuring Chitraratha is narrated in the Adi Parva as a minor episode, following the episode of killing of a demon namely, Bakasura. While the Pandavas and their mother, Kunti, are traveling at night toward the northern Ganges, they reach a sacred ford known as Somashravayana. At this location, Chitraratha is sporting in the water with his wives. Disturbed by the noise of the approaching party, he confronts them in a state of rage. Chitraratha asserts his dominion over that stretch of the river, claiming that during the hours of dusk and night, the waters belong exclusively to the Yakshas, Gandharvas and Rakshasas.

The Pandava prince Arjuna challenges Chitraratha’s claim, asserting that the ocean, the Himalayas, and the Ganges are open to all at any time. In the ensuing skirmish, Chitraratha attacks with blazing arrows, but Arjuna counters by using the Agneyastra—a divine weapon of fire he had received through his preceptor Drona. The weapon destroys Chitraratha’s chariot and renders him unconscious. Arjuna seizes him to bring him before his brothers. However, Chitraratha’s wife, Kumbhinasi, appeals to the eldest Pandava, Yudhisthira, for mercy. Yudhisthira grants her request and orders Arjuna to release Chitraratha.

Following his defeat, Chitraratha abandons his name "Angaraparna" (meaning "he whose chariot is like burning coal") out of shame of his defeat, and expresses gratitude for being spared. In exchange for his life and as a gesture of friendship, Chitraratha provides Arjuna with Chakshushi, a spiritual knowledge/power which Chitraratha obtained from another Gandharva named Vishvavasu. It allows the possessor to see anything they wished within the three worlds. Chitraratha also promises one hundred horses of Gandharva breed to each of the Pandavas. In return, Arjuna gifts Chitraratha the knowledge of the Agneya weapon.

Chitraratha then explains to the Pandavas that they had been vulnerable to his attack because they traveled without a dedicated priest (Purohita) and did not maintain the sacred fires. When Arjuna inquires if he knows of someone suitable for the role, Chitraratha directs them to the sage Dhaumya. He further recounts historical narratives of Pandavas’ ancestors, including the stories of Tapati and Vasishtha. Following this advice, the Pandavas depart to find Dhaumya.

The Sabha Parva narrates that later during Yudhishthira's coronation as Emperor, Chitraratha visits the ceremony along with his brother, Tumburu, and gifts speckled horses.

== In Puranic texts ==
Chitraratha's role as a skilled musician and his high status among the Gandharvas remain consistent across various Puranic texts, which mention him performing at different events and specifically note his appointment as the king of the Gandharvas by the creator god Brahma.

The Bhagavata Purana mentions another bathing incident involving Chitraratha in which he, wearing only a garland of lotuses, enjoys erotic dalliances with his women while bathing in a river. This is witnessed by Renuka, the wife of a sage, who experiences a temporary yet intense desire for Chitraratha, causing her to lose the powers she had gained through her chastity. Although the same episode is narrated in other texts, including the Mahabharata, Chitraratha there is described as a king of Marttikavata rather than a Gandharva. However some scholars specifically identifies him as the Gandharva himself.

In a narrative found in the Devi Bhagavata Purana, the god Shiva sends Chitraratha as a messenger to the asura Samkhchuda to warn the asura and advise him to abandon his evil deeds. The Brahma Vaivarta Purana mentions an unnamed daughter of Chitraratha who is married to the god Shani.

== In classical literature ==
Chitraratha has been adapted as a character in various classical literary works. Notably, he appears in Vikramorvashiyam, a Sanskrit play based on the mythological story of the nymph Urvashi and King Pururavas, written by the poet Kalidasa (fl. 4th-5th century AD). Although Chitraratha has no role in the original myth, Kalidasa introduces him here not only as the King of the Gandharvas, but also as a messenger of Indra. Chitraratha acts as a bridge in providing information to the lovers—'heavenly' Urvashi and 'mortal' Pururavas.
