= Indrastra =

Celestial weapon of Hindu deity Indra

Indrastra (Sanskrit: इन्द्रास्त्र, romanized: Indrāstra) is the astra (celestial weapon) of the Hindu deity Indra. The astra is featured in Hindu texts such as the Ramayana and the Mahabharata. Characters such as Rama, Lakshmana and Arjuna, among others, are considered to have yielded the Indrastra.

== Literature ==
=== Mahabharata ===
In the Mahabharata, Indra offers the Indrastra to Arjuna.

On the fourteenth day of the Kurukshetra War, when Arjuna wanted to kill King Jayadratha, Drona and Duryodhana sent their men to stop Arjuna. One of these was King Sudakshina, who threw his spear at Arjuna, striking him and causing his blood to flow. Even as the Kauravas believed him to be dead, Arjuna launched the Indrastra, killing King Sudakshina and a large part of his army.

=== Ramayana ===
In the Ramayana, Lakshmana employs the Indrastra to kill Indrajita, the son of Ravana.

== See also ==
- Brahmastra
- Narayanastra
- Pashupatastra
