= Vishvavasu =

Celestial being in Hindu mythology

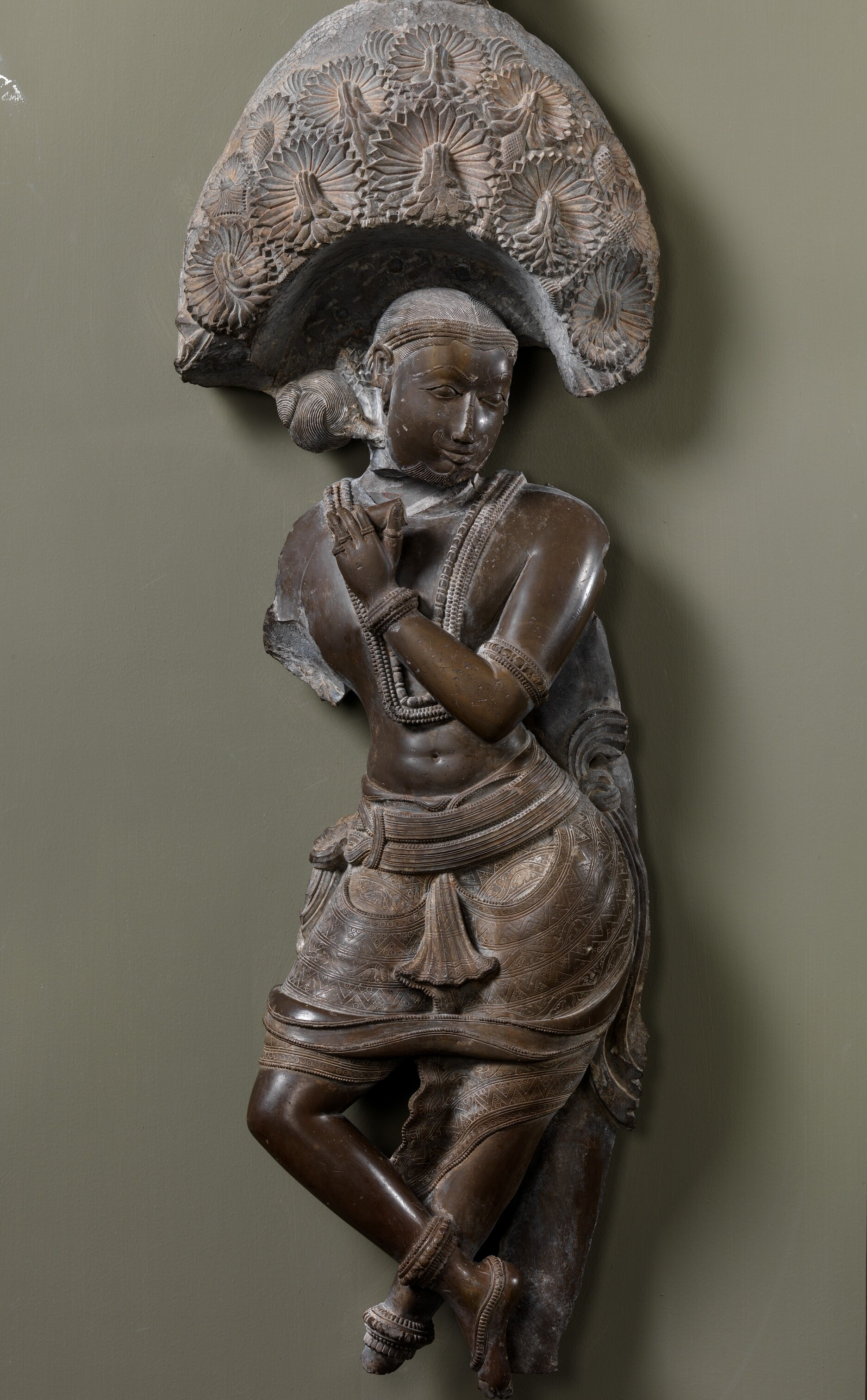
An 11^{th} century sculpture of a Gandharva from Karnataka, India. Vishvavasu is the most prominent of his class.

Vishvavasu (Sanskrit: विश्वावसु, romanized: Viśvāvasu, lit. 'possessing all goods', also rendered as Vishwavasu and Visvavasu), is the most revered gandharva (a class of celestial beings) in Hindu religion and mythology. The term is originally the epithet of the sole Gandharva mentioned in the Rigveda (c. 1500—1200 BCE), where he is a minor deity, regarded as the possessive guardian of unmarried women and soma (a ritual drink). He is also considered as a jealous rival of newlywed husbands. In later Vedic texts (the other Vedas and Brahmanas), he is described as either stealing Soma from the gods or being its original possessor.

In the post-Vedic literature such as the Mahabharata and Puranas, Vishvavasu is regarded as the king of the gandharvas, who by then were firmly established as a class of celestial musicians, leading them at various celestial events. He is noted for his exceptional skills in singing and playing the veena (lute or harp), and is frequently portrayed giving performances in the courts of the devas (gods). He also possesses Chakshushi, a divine sight by which one could see any thing at any place at any time. Vishvavasu is the father of another prominent gandharva, namely Chitrasena, and the nymph Pramadvara.

== Development ==
In the Rigveda (c. 1500 BCE—1200 BCE), the term viśvāvasu, which means 'possessing all goods', is primarily used alongside the word 'Gandharva' (9.86; 10.139) and is also employed alone in one hymn to designate the Gandharva directly (10.85). A number of scholars consider the term rather as an epithet for the celestial being, while some regard it as his name. In the earliest layers of the Rigveda (c. 1500 BCE), the Gandharva is primarily a singular celestial entity. Out of twenty occurrences in the text, only three refer to the Gandharvas in the plural, suggesting a gradual development from a distinct individual being into a broader class of deities. This transition is finalised by the time of the Atharvaveda (c. 1200–900 BCE), where they are established as a category of 6,333 beings, and Vishvavasu being the proper name of one of the gandharva chiefs.

== In Vedic texts ==
Vishvavasu is the most revered Gandharva in the Vedic texts and invoked multiple times across various texts. In the Rigveda, the sole Gandharva, who is also called Vishvavasu, is associated with the high regions of the air or sky, celestial light, the sun, rainbow, moon, a lunar mansion, and the waters, and mentioned as a measurer of space and water. He is described as being "wind-haired" and possessing good weapons and fragrant garments, as well as being the lover of Apsaras (female celestial being of waters and clouds). In one hymn (RV 10.139.5), he is invoked by priest for protection of their sacrifices.

In the context of the marriage hymn in the Rigveda (RV 10.85.21-22), Vishvavasu (directly used to denote the sole Gandharva here) is viewed as a mystical rival to the groom in the first days of wedlock and the priest explicitly commands the Gandharva Vishvavasu to leave the bride. He is urged to relinquish the girl to her human husband and find another maiden. It is also attested (RV 10.85.40) that the Gandharva also acts as a temporary possessor or "husband" of the bride, along with the deities Soma and Agni, before she is handed over to her human husband. The commentator Sayana explains that while Soma protects all girls during ther childhood, Vishvavasu is said to possess them from the advent of their youth (after they develop attraction for the opposite sex) and transfer them to Agni from whom the bridegrooms obtain.

The sole Gandharva of the Rigveda is most importantly associated with the intoxicating ritual drink Soma. He is also described as the guardian of the "place of Soma" who protects the races of the gods (RV 9.83). He is depicted standing on the vault of heaven, observing all the forms of Soma (RV 9.85), and cherishing it along with Parjanya and the daughter of the sun (RV 9.113). He is also portrayed as possessive of the drink and hostile whom the god Indra must overcome or pierce in the regions of air (RV 8.1, 8.66). Later Vedic texts expand on this: the Taittiriya Samhita (TS 1.2.9) beseeches Soma to elude the gandharva Vishvavasu in the form of an eagle. According to the Aitareya Brahmana (AB 1.27), Taittiriya Samhita (TS 6.1.6⁵), and Maitrayani Samhita (MS 3.7⁴), Soma dwelt among the gandharvas or was stolen by the gandharva Vishvavasu. The gods ultimately obtained Soma from the gandharvas—who were fond of females—by exchanging the goddess Vāc (Speech).

== In Epic and Puranic texts ==
By the time of epic literature, consisting of the Mahabharata and Ramayana, gandharvas were firmly established as a class of celestial musicians of the heavens. Vishvavasu in these texts is allotted the title Gandharvarāja (King of the Gandharvas) and is regarded as their most venerable figure. He is frequently mentioned alongside other foremost gandharvas, namely Chitrasena, Tumburu, and Narada, all of whom are described being skilled not only in music, but also dance.

Vishvavasu is described being a Devagandharva ('divine gandharva'), performing at the abodes of the devas, especially Indra and Kubera, and singing their praises. Vishvavasu is a master of the seven-stringed Veena (lute/harp). The Mahabharata describes his playing as so "delicate" and evocative that during the sacrifice of King Dilipa, each of the thousands of attendees believed he was playing for them alone. He is often depicted performing at the centre of a massive troupe consisting of "seven times six thousand" (42,000) dancing Gandharvas. Vishvavasu is mentioned at various other events, including performing during the birth of the hero Arjuna and reciting a religious shloka at a sacrifice performed by sage Jamadagni. Vishvavasu also preaches a sermon on the religious duties of a husband and the Shanti Parva also attests Vishvavasu asking hermit Yajnavalkya twenty-four questions. The Adi Parva also mentions that Vishvavasu gained Cākṣuṣīvidyā (the art of seeing all) from the moon god, Soma, and taught it to his disciple, the gandharva Chitraratha.

Vishvavasu is provided with detailed family relations in the epics. The Mahabharata describes him as a son of the divine progenitor Kashyapa and his wife Pradha; elsewhere, he is mentioned as the son of Muni and Bharanya (whom the scholar E. Hopkins deduced as being another Gandharva). Chitrasena is described as his son in the epic, who becomes a good friend to Arjuna; Vishvavasu himself is depicted as an "elder" friend to the hero. The Mahabharata also mentions Vishvavasu courting the celestial nymph Menaka and fathering a daughter, Pramadvara, whom Menaka abandons soon after birth. According to the Uttara Kanda of the Ramayana, Vishvavasu fathers another daughter, Kumbhinasi, with Anala, who is the daughter of a Rakshasa Malyavan. Kumbhinasi is abducted by the Rakshasa Madhu as his wife. The epic further details a narrative in which Vishvavasu, under a temporary curse from a sage, assumes the form of the Rakshasa Kabandha, remaining in that state until his liberation by the deity Rama.

Various Puranic scriptures—such as the Harivamsha, Vishnu Purana, and Devi-Bhagavata Purana—elaborate on how Vishvavasu led the gandharvas to reclaim the foremost apsara Urvashi. After she married the mortal king Pururava, the gandharvas sought to bring her back to heaven by sabotaging the specific conditions of their marriage. The Harivamsha features another narrative in which Vishvavasu pacifies King Janamejaya. The King, suspecting his wife of adultery with Indra, demands her removal; however, Vishvavasu intervenes by explaining that the individual he suspected was actually the nymph Rambha in disguise. In the Bhagavata Purana, an allegory describes different orders of celestial beings extracting 'milk' from the Earth (Prithvi), who is personified as a cow. Representing the Apsaras and Gandharvas, Vishvavasu acts as the calf for their group, allowing them to successfully draw forth the essences of music and dance in a lotus cup.
