= Mukasura =

Asura in the Mahabharata

- Mahabharata character
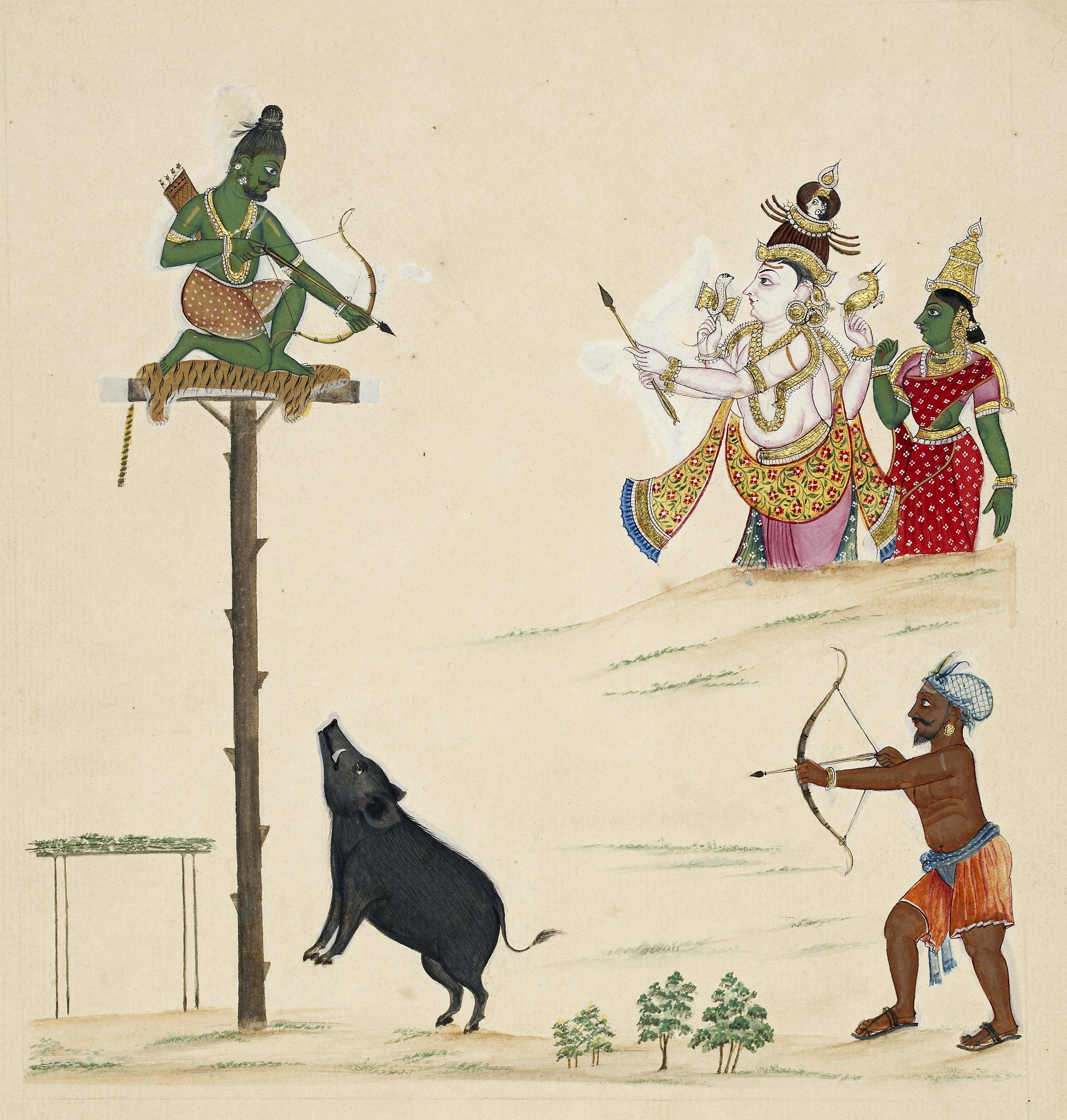
- Mukasura (boar) rushes towards Arjuna (left)

Information
- Affiliation: Asura

Mukasura (Sanskrit: मुकासुर, romanized: Mukāsura) is an asura featured in the Indian epic Mahabharata.

== Legend ==
In the Kairata Parva of the Mahabharata, Arjuna ascends the Indrakila mountain to perform a penance to please Shiva and obtain the deity's personal weapon, the Pashupatastra. He is attacked by a danava named Mukasura, who had assumed the form of a boar. Arjuna proclaims that he means no harm to the beast, but would slay it in self-defence. Shiva, disguised as a kirata (hunter), shouts at the prince to stop, stating that he had aimed at the creature first. Both of their arrows strike Mukasura at the same moment, killing him. Arjuna angrily accuses the hunter of breaking the law of the hunt and attacks him. The two exchange arrows, and Arjuna finds that he is no match for his opponent. To propitiate Shiva, Arjuna creates an earthen lingam and decorates it with a garland. He is overjoyed when the garland appears around the hunter's head, realising his true identity. Shiva appreciates the valour of Arjuna and grants him the boon of the missile.

== Literature ==
The legend of Mukasura and the confrontation between Shiva and Arjuna forms the basis of the classical Sanskrit epic poem Kiratarjuniya, composed by the poet Bharavi between the 5th and 6th centuries CE. The work elaborates upon the Mahabharata's narrative, in which Mukasura attacks Arjuna during his penance on Mount Indrakila.

== Architecture ==
A Khmer sculpture, now partially damaged, from Prasat Thom Gopura II (West) in Koh Ker, Cambodia, depicts two grappling figures and has been tentatively identified as a representation of Shiva and Arjuna wrestling over the boar Muka, the same Mukasura from the Kiratarjuniya episode of the Mahabharata.

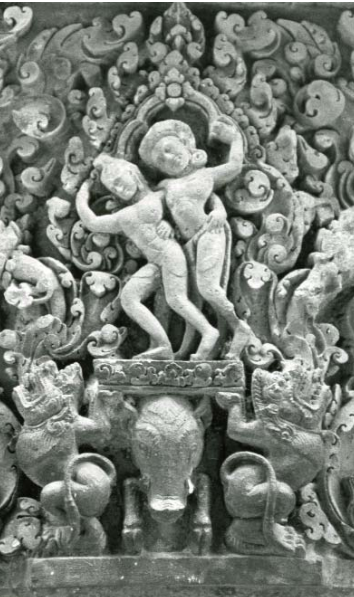
Details showing the "Kiratarjuniya scene" in the souther intel of the central shrine at the Banteay Srei
