= Brahmastra =

Celestial weapon in Hindu mythology

The Brahmastra (Sanskrit: ब्रह्मास्त्र, romanized: Brahmāstra, lit. 'Astra of Brahma') is the supreme Hindu celestial weapon (astra) created and owned by the god Brahma along with its more powerful variant, the Brahmashirastra. The latter is considered to be the most destructive, powerful, and irresistible weapon mentioned in all of Hinduism.

Only a handful of gods and warrior-heroes, namely Parashurama, Rama, Kalki, Meghanada, Bhishma, Drona, Karna, Ashvatthama, Arjuna, and Lakshmana, were said to have possessed the knowledge to invoke this weapon.

== Description ==
It is termed as a fiery weapon that creates a fierce fireball accompanied by roars and flames, blazing with innumerable horrendous thunder flashes. When discharged, all nature in the area trembles, including trees, oceans, and animals. Its deployment is said to lead to a catastrophic explosion, which causes everything in existence of the radius to shiver violently, the sky fills with fire and smoke, rivers evaporate, and entire armies are slaughtered in one blow.

When used, the Brahmastra is said to target and destroy a single enemy, and if they do not possess an alternate counter-weapon, defeat is certain. If the more powerful variant, the Brahmashirastra, it causes collateral damage to every useful resource in a given area and prevents even a single blade of grass from ever growing in that area again. Rivers completely dry up, ensuring famines. It is mentioned that there would be no rainfall for 12 Brahma years (12 Brahma years = 37.32 trillion human years) and climate conditions will worsen. The strike of the Brahmastra will eventually destroy everything.

When Ashwatthama hurled the Brahmastra against Arjuna, the Pandava countered by invoking the same weapon; to prevent widespread destruction. Narada and Vyasa stood between the two astras, ordering the two warriors to withdraw their weapons. Arjuna, out of nobility, did so. However, Ashwatthama, out of anger, and not knowing the way to recall the astra as he did not have the entire teaching of Brahmashtra and how to recall it so he rather directed it to Uttarā's womb to kill the unborn Parikshit in an attempt to cause damage to his opponents, but Krishna intervened and saved the child. Ashwatthama was made to surrender the gem on his forehead and cursed by Krishna that he will roam in the forests until the end of time with blood and pus oozing out of his injuries as he cries for death, but death would not meet him.

== Variants ==
=== Brahmashirā Astra ===
The Brahmashirā Astra or Brahmashirsha astra (Brahma's 4 head weapon), manifests with four heads of Brahma at the front and is four times stronger than the normal Brahmastra. Arjuna, Drona, Karna, Ashwatthama, and Bhishma were among who possessed this knowledge in Mahabharata. It is also able to annihilate someone's existence from the past, present, and future, making their existence impossible to be imagined and because they did not exist and will not exist, it is impossible for them to ever exist in any facet or form in any meaningful way.

=== Brahma Danda ===
The Brahma Danda (Brahma's rod) is a weapon of self-defence, created by Brahma. It is only to be possessed by ascetics and its powers are dependent on its owner. The weapon is a rod capable of absorbing any incoming attack towards its owner. When Vishvamitra, in a fit of anger, unleashed the Brahmastra onto Vasishtha, it was his Brahma Danda that protected him from the lethal weapon.

== Literature ==
There are numerous instances within Sanskrit scriptures where the Brahmastra is used or its use is threatened, including:

- Kaushika (who later became Brahmarshi Vishvamitra) used it against Maharishi Vasishta, but the Brahmastra was swallowed by Vasishta's Brahma danda.
- Indrajit used the Brahmastra against Hanuman, but Hanuman survived because of the boon previously given to him by Brahma.
- In the Ramayana, a Brahmastra is used by Rama several times: once against Jayanta when he hurt Sita, against Maricha in their last encounter, and finally the Brahmastra was used in the last battle with the rakshasa emperor Ravana. According to the Ramayana, the weapon was also aimed at Sagara (the sea god) to carve a path out of the sea, such that Rama's army could march towards the island of Lanka. However, as Rama was about to shoot the Brahmastra at him, Sagara appeared and offered to assist the king in crossing the ocean.

== See also ==
- Narayanastra
- Pashupatastra
- Varunastra
