= Brahmashirastra =

Most powerful astra of Brahmāstra variant mentioned in Indian Mythology

The Brahmashirastra (Sanskrit: ब्रह्मशिरास्त्र, romanized: Brahmaśirāstra) or Brahmashira Namaka Astra is the most destructive weapon, or Astra, described in ancient Hindu texts, capable of ending the existence of gods or devas. Thought to be a superior variant of the Brahmastra, the Brahmashirastra causes chain reactions of massive explosions and waves to annihilate any desired entity of the universe or even the universe itself. The weapon manifests with the four heads of Brahma as its tip. Agnivesha, Drona, Karna, Ashwatthama and Arjuna are the powerful warriors who possessed the knowledge to invoke this weapon. This weapon can be invoked into any object, even to a blade of grass.

In the Mahabharata, it is explained that when this weapon is invoked, "It blazes up with terrible flames within a huge sphere of fire. Numerous peals of thunder to be heard, fissures start on earth, rivers become dry, thousands of meteors fell, and all living creatures became terrified with great dread. The entire sky seemed to be filled with noise and assumed a terrible aspect with flames of fire. The whole earth with her mountains and waters and trees trembled". When it strikes an area, it will be destroyed and nothing will ever grow there, not even a blade of grass for the next 50 Brahma years (155.5 trillion human years).

Its true power is the ability to remove someone's existence from the past, present, and future. Upon being fired, the arrow will immediately annihilate their existence, and because if something never existed and will never exist, it is impossible to imagine that entity in any facet or form.

== See also ==
- Indian epic poetry
  - Ramayana
  - Mahabharata
  - Puranas
  - Vyūha
