= Vikramōrvaśīyam =

Sanskrit play by Kālidāsa

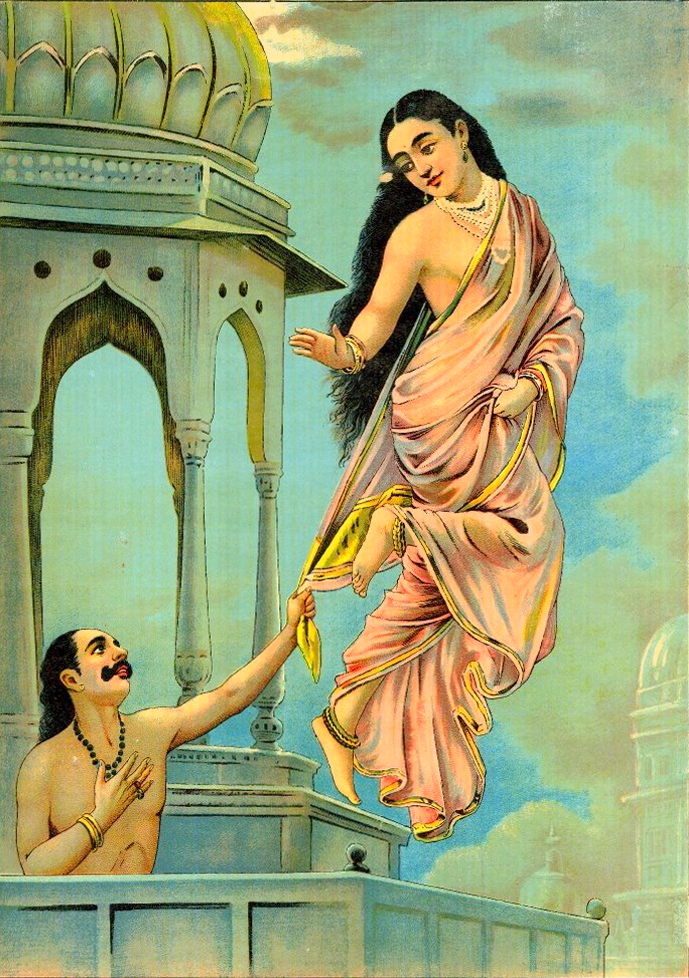
- An 1890 painting by Raja Ravi Varma depicting Pururavas and Urvashi, the protagonists of the play
- Original language: Sanskrit
- Written by: Kālidāsa
- Characters: Pururava; Urvashi; Ayus; Manavaka; Chitralekha; Aushinari; Nipunika; Rambha; Menaka; Sahajanya; Chitraratha; Satyavati; Narada

Vikramōrvaśīyam (Sanskrit: विक्रमोर्वशीयम्, lit. 'Ūrvaśī Won by Valour') is a five-act Sanskrit play by ancient Indian poet Kālidāsa, who lived in the 4th or 5th Century CE, on the Vedic love story of King Pururavas and an Apsarā (celestial nymph) named Ūrvaśī, known for her beauty.

As per the tradition, while the basic plot has taken elements from the sources such as the Samvāda Sūkta of the Rig Veda, Mahābhārata and others, Kālidāsa has made significant adaptations to make the presentation more appealing while establishing his prowess as a playwright.

Vikramorvaśīyam is the second of the three plays written by Kālidāsa, the first being Mālavikāgnimitram and the third being the celebrated Abhijñānaśākuntalam.

According to one theory, "Vikrama" in the title alludes to Kālidāsa's patron king Vikramāditya. However, there is no conclusive evidence for this, although both are said to have lived around the same time period. It simply means "Valour".

== Origin of the plot ==
The classical theory of Sanskrit drama, known as Natyaśāstra makes it a rule that the plot of a Sanskrit drama 'must be famous'. Accordingly, authors of Sanskrit plays use the stories from Purāṇas, Vedic texts and classic epics, namely Mahābhārata and Rāmāyaṇa for developing plays. However, the core objective of a drama is entertainment. Since everyone is familiar with the basic plot, if the presentation of the play is not interesting or enchanting in some way, people would be bored. Hence there is emphasis on originality of the playwright. In the case of Vikramorvaśīyam, here is how Kālidāsa has adapted the original subject:

Ṛg-veda : In the 95th section, called Sūkta of the tenth cluster (called Maṇḍala), there is a dialogue between Pururava and Ūrvaśī. Situation suggests that she has left the king after living for four years with him. The king beseeches her to return, but she refuses (saying, "na vai straiṇāni santi śālavṛkānām hṛdayānyetāḥ" - meaning, the hearts of women are like those of jackals). The story ends at that.

Śatapatha Brāhmaṇa: Apparently aimed at emphasizing importance of a Yagya, Pururava was attracted to Ūrvaśī when she came to his city. She agreed with a condition, but when the king could not honor it because of manipulation by Gandharva people, she left him. Later, moved by the king's plight without her, she agreed to return once every year to him. The king still missed her a lot, so now convinced of his love, the Gandharvas asked him to perform a Yagya, due to which Pururava attained Gandharva-hood and could reunite with Urvashi (P. 1.2).

Purana: In all, Vishnu Purana (4.6, 34-39), Padma Purana (Sṛṣṭi Khaṇḍa 12, 62-68), Matsya Purana (24, 10-32), Mahabharata, Bhāgavata Purana (9, 14) and the story of Gunadhya in Brihatkatha are the sources of the story of Pururava and Urvashi. There are multiple versions of these stories in different sources, but one can see the following elements in this pool: Urvashi descends from heaven for some reason and meets Pururava; the two live together under some conditions for some time; on one occasion Urvashi has to part from the king under some sort of breach, for which she is punished by changing her form; Urvashi returns to her form and gets reunited with the king, but there comes a time when she has to return to heaven to serve Indral; and the two have a son together, named Ayuṣa.

Whether they lived together happily ever after is questionable, because there is one more story in Mahabharata in which Arjuna (a descendant of Pururava) goes to heaven and meets Urvashi there. Hence, by inference she and Pururava lived together during his lifetime, as he was a mortal.

== Cast of characters ==
=== Prologue ===
Characters reciting the Benediction are:

- Sutradhara - Director/producer and over-all manager of the theatre
- Marisha - Sutradhara's assistant and he is probably in charge of the stage and the cast

=== Play ===
Major characters appearing in the play are:

- Pururava - A king of the lunar dynasty, who rules Pratishthana Kingdom; the hero of the play
- Urvashi - The foremost of the apsaras, the celestial dancers of the heaven; the heroine of the play
- Ayus - Son of Pururava and Urvashi, fostered in the hermitage of sage Chyavana
- Chitralekha - An apsara and Urvashi's close friend
- Manavaka - A vidushaka (jester) and Pururava's close friend, who aids in his romantic pursuit
- Aushinari - The princess of Kashi and the queen-consort of Pururava
- Nipunika - The personal attendant of Aushinari, who informs the queen about Pururava's love for Urvashi
- Rambha, Menaka and Sahajanya - Three apsara companions of Urvashi, who report about her abduction to Pururavas
- Narada - A divine-sage, who acts as emissary of Indra
- Chitraratha - Chief of gandharvas, the heavenly musicians, and the messenger of the god Indra
- Pallava and Galava - disciples of Bharata Muni
- Satyavati - A disciple of Chyavana and the foster-mother of Ayus
- Suta - Charioteer of Pururavas
- Latavya - Chief officer of royal chambers of Aushinari
- Kirati - A huntress dwelling in the mountains
- Yavani - A Graeco-Bactrian bow-bearer

Characters with significant mentions in the play are:

- Indra - The king of the gods and an ally of Pururava
- Bharata Muni - The sage who curses Urvashi to descend on the Earth
- Keshi - A danava (demon) monarch who abducts Urvashi
- Brihaspati - the teacher of the gods
- Kubera - God of riches
- Kartikeya - The commander of the gods' army, and the protagonist of Kumarsambhavam, another work by Kalidasa
- Udayavati - A gandharva girl to whom Pururava is temporary attracted
- Chyavana - the teacher of Ayus
- Dikpalas - the divine guardians of the directions

== Plot ==
Once upon a time, Urvashi, who was an Apsara, was returning to heaven from the palace of Kubera on mount Kailasa. She was with Chitralekha, Rambha and many others, but the demon named Keshin abducted Urvashi and Chitralekha and went in the North-East direction. The group of Apsaras started screaming for help, which was heard by the king Pururava, who rescued the two. Urvashi and Pururava fall in love at first sight. The nymphs were immediately summoned back to heaven.

King tried to focus on his work, but he was unable to shake off the preoccupation with the thoughts of Urvashi. He wondered if his was a case of unrequited love, and consults his friend, Manavaka. Meanwhile, Aushinari, the wife of Pururava, gets suspicious after a love-sick Pururavas addresses her as "Urvashi". The queen's personal attendant Nipunika cleverly manages to get information about the source of Pururava's inanity and informs it to Aushinari. Urvashi, who had gone in invisible form to see the king, wrote a message on a birch leaf instantly, confirming her love.

Unfortunately, the leaf was carried off by the wind and stopped only at the feet of Aushinari. She was enraged at first, but later declared that she would not come in the way of lovers. Before Urvashi and Pururava could talk, Urvashi was summoned again to heaven to perform in a play. She was so smitten that she missed her cue and mispronounced her lover's name during the performance as Pururava instead of Purushottama. As a punishment, Urvashi was banished from heaven, which was modified by Indra as until the moment her human lover laid eyes on the child that she would bear him. After a series of mishaps, including Urvashi's temporary transformation into a vine, the curse was eventually lifted, and the lovers were allowed to remain together on Earth as long as Pururava lived.

== In popular culture ==
Kanjibhai Rathod directed Vikram Urvashi, a 1920 Indian silent film adaptation; this was followed by Vishnupant Divekar's Urvashi in 1921.

Vikrama Urvashi is a 1940 Indian Tamil-language film directed by C. V. Raman based on the play.

In 1954, Madhu Bose made an Indian Bengali-language film adaptation titled Vikram Urvashi.

The story of a nymph marrying a noble-born human and leaving her celestial home has been used in 1957 Tamil film Manalane Mangayin Bhagyam.

== See also ==
- Sanskrit literature
- Sanskrit drama
- List of Sanskrit plays in English translation
