= Vayavyastra =

Celestial weapon of Hindu god Vayu

Vayavyastra (Sanskrit: वायव्यास्त्र, romanized: Vāyavyāstra) is a celestial weapon (astra) in Hindu mythology. Named after and attributed to the wind god Vayu, the weapon is referenced in various Hindu texts, such as the Mahabharata and the Puranas.
