= Suryastra =

Celestial weapon used by warriors in Hindu Epics

Suryastra (Sanskrit सूर्यस्त्र) is one of the prominent astras in Hindu epics. It is the weapon of the Hindu deity Surya. It creates bright energy which destroys darkness, illuminates the sky and dries up water bodies. It was used by multiple warriors, including Rama, Ravana, Karna, Atikaya etc., in the Ramayana, Mahabharata, and the Puranas.

== Uses ==
In the Ramayana, Atikaya used the weapon to Counter Lakshmana's Agneyastra. When Ravana used it against Rama, it illuminated and blazed the entire sky as well as the moon and other planets. In the Mahabharata, many warriors such as Karna and Bhisma possessed this weapon.

== See also ==
- Astra
