= Ghoshayatra Parva =

Section of Hindu epic Mahabharata

The Ghosayatra Parva (Sanskrit: घोषयात्रा पर्व, romanized: Ghoṣayātrā Parva, lit. 'Expedition to the cowherd assembly section') is a section and an episode of the Hindu epic Mahabharata. Consisting of 519 shlokas, it is named after the episode in which the Kauravas undertake an expedition to see the cowherds of Dvaitavana, a forest where the Pandavas reside. This is done under the pretext of cattle inspection, but with the ulterior motive of humiliating their cousins. During the course of this episode, the Kauravas are captured by the gandharvas, and are released from their captivity by the Pandavas. Duryodhana finds the outcome of the entire affair embarrassing, and resolves to fast to death until he is dissuaded from this course of action. Instead, he opts to return to Hastinapura to perform a sacrifice.

== Synopsis ==
Duryodhana and the other Kauravas went on an expedition. During this trip, The Kaurava host were attacked by the Gandharavs. After a brief victory, the army of the Gandharvas used illusions on them, which broke the formation of the Kourava armies and they were rerouted. On learning this Arjuna along with the other Pandavas decided to save the Kouravas and battled the Gandharvas. After the initial battle, Chitrasena the king of the Gandharvas revealed that he only midly fought with the Pandavas as he was a friend of Arjuna and only wanted to capture Duryodhana.Thus freeing Duryodhana, the Kuru host returned back to their kingdoms.
