= Varunastra =

Celestial weapon in Hindu mythology

The Varunastra (Sanskrit: वरुणास्त्र, romanized: Varuṇāstra, lit. 'Astra of Varuna') is the signature celestial weapon (astra) of the Hindu god of the hydrosphere, Varuna. It is described as a water weapon (a storm) in Indian scriptures, said to be amorphous like water and thus able to assume any weapon's shape. Upon usage, it conjures torrential volumes of water that can wash away large numbers of infantry.

The Varunastra is often deployed to counter the fire-based Agneyastra, and one of the only counters for the Varunastra is Visoshanastra, an astra obtainable by Indra, King of Gods, that can dry its waters. As per the Indian legends or Puranas, the Varunastra is said to have been obtained by great warrior-heroes such as Rama, Lakshmana, Hanuman, Ravana, Meghanada, Vishvamitra, Vasishta, Arjuna, Karna, Krishna, Satyaki, Abhimanyu, Pradyumna, Drona, Bhishma, and many other illustrious characters.

The scriptures say this weapon was obtained by meditating on Varuna or Shiva, and was to be used with great care and skill. The usage of this weapon was not possible for any inexperienced warrior, because if a slight mistake were committed, the user himself could be destroyed. Indian scriptures and epics give large insights into weapons used by proper use of mantras, that would have to be properly intoned as per the prescription.

== See also ==
- Varunastra (torpedo)
- Astra (weapon)
- Agneyastra
