= Pashupatastra =

Celestial missile affiliated to Shiva

The Pashupatastra (IAST: Pāśupatāstra, Sanskrit: पाशुपतास्त्र; the Pashupati, an epithet of Shiva) is an astra, a celestial missile, affiliated with the Hindu deity Shiva, as well as Kali and Adi Parashakti, which can be discharged by the mind, the eyes, words, or a bow.

== Description ==
Never to be used against lesser enemies or by lesser warriors, the Pashupatastra is capable of destroying creation and vanquishing all beings. In the Mahabharata, only Arjuna and in the Ramayana, only the sage Vishvamitra, sage Parashurama, Indrajit and Rama possessed the Pashupatastra. It is one of the six Mantramukta weapons that cannot be resisted.

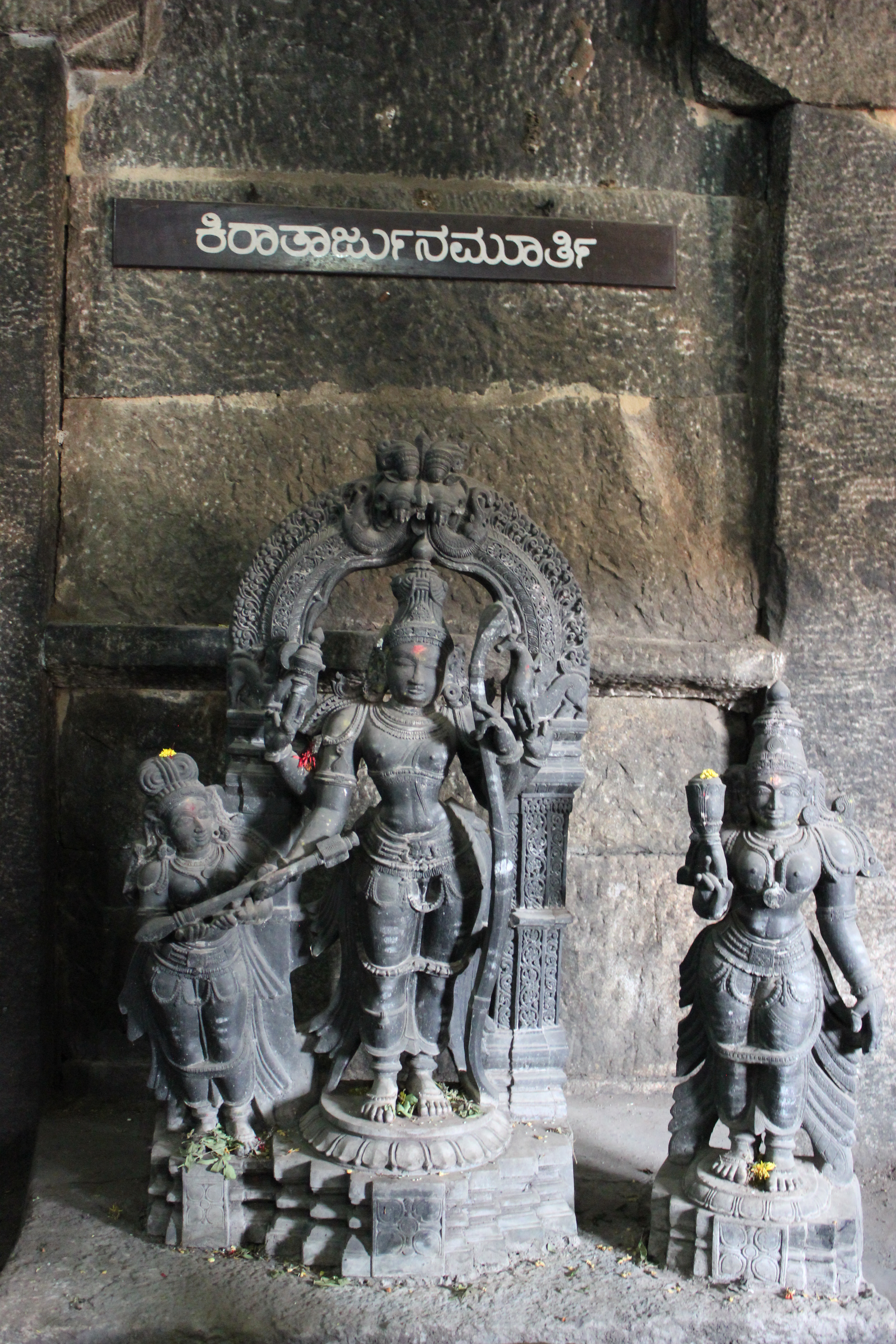
The same episode in a murti, Srikanteshwara Temple, Nanjangud.

== Literature ==
=== Mahabharata ===
After the battle at the Khandava forest, Indra had promised Arjuna to give him all his weapons, as a boon for matching him in battle, with the requirement that Shiva should be appeased by him. Following the advice of Krishna to undertake a tapasya to attain this divine weapon, Arjuna left his brothers for the performance of a penance.

On learning about Arjuna's penance, Duryodhana sent the asura Mukasura to kill Arjuna. Mukasura took the form of a wild boar to interrupt Arjuna's worship. Upon knowing this, Shiva appeared there, in the form of a hunter. Arjuna shot an arrow at the boar, and slew it. At the same time, Shiva (in the disguise of a kirata) had also released an arrow from his bow. A scuffle arose between the two as to whose arrow had slain the boar. The scuffle led to an exchange of arrow-fire, until Arjuna's quiver was depleted. The Pandava struck the hunter's head with his sword, which shattered to pieces. The two exchanged blows, until Arjuna was beaten senseless against the earth.

Arjuna soon regained consciousness and began to mentally worship Lord Shiva. He mentally offered a garland, and when he looked up he saw that the garland was on the crown of the Kirata. He then understood that the Kirata was Lord Shiva, and overwhelmed with joy, Arjuna fell at his feet. Lord Shiva was satisfied with Arjuna and said, "O Phalguna, I am pleased with you, for no one can rival your prowess. There is no kshatriya who is equal to you in courage and patience. O sinless one, your strength and prowess almost equal mine. Behold me, O bull of the Bharata race. I will grant you eyes to see my true form. Without doubt you will defeat your enemies, including those in heaven. I have been pleased with you and will grant you an irresistible weapon.

— Mahabharata, Vana Parva, Chapter 3

Shiva, and his wife, Parvati, offered their darshana to Arjuna, and blessed him with the Pashupatastra.

Pashupatastra is considered indestructible and can destroy any creation, but its use is prohibited against mortals. It is one of the six Mantramukta weapons that cannot be resisted.

== See also ==
- Brahmastra
- Narayanastra
- Astra (weapon)
- Kirātārjunīya, a 6th-century epic poem describing Arjuna’s penance

== Resources ==
- Dictionary of Hindu Lore and Legend (ISBN 0-500-51088-1) by Anna Dallapiccola
