= Narayanastra =

Celestial missile in Hindu mythology

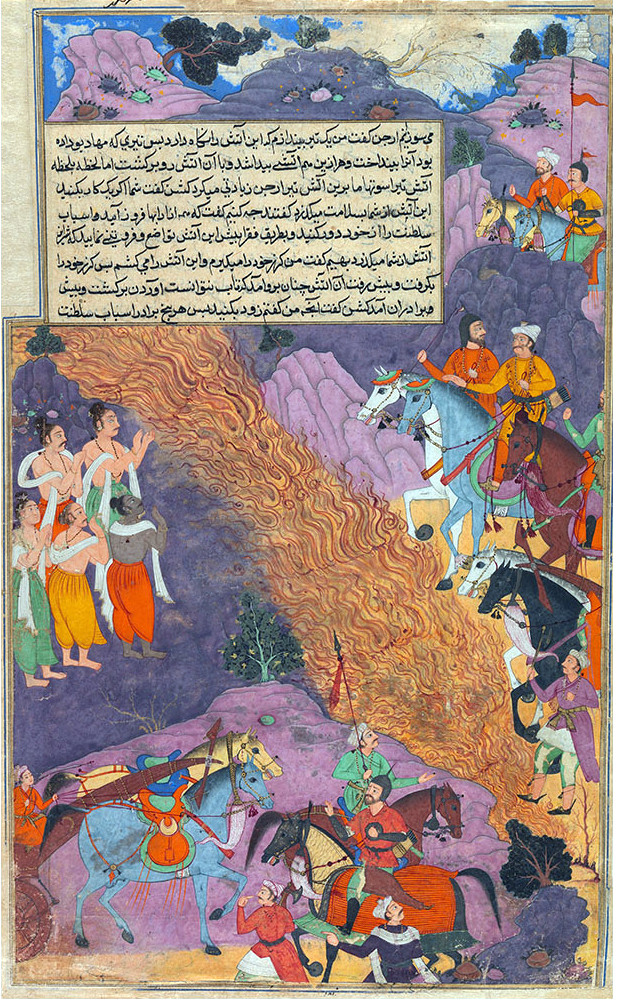
Ashwatthama fires the Narayanastra on Pandavas

In Hindu mythology, the Narayanastra (Sanskrit: नारायणास्त्रम्, romanized: nārāyaṇāstram, lit. 'Celestial missile of Narayana') is an astra, a celestial missile, affiliated to the Hindu deity, Vishnu, in his form of Narayana.

== Description ==
This astra ("celestial weapon" in Sanskrit) fires a volley of millions of deadly missiles simultaneously, the intensity of which rises in proportion to the resistance of the target. The only way to defend against the Narayanastra is, therefore, to show total submission before the missiles hit, which would cause them to stop and spare the target. It is one of the six 'Mantramukta' weapons that cannot be resisted.

== Literature ==
=== Mahabharata ===
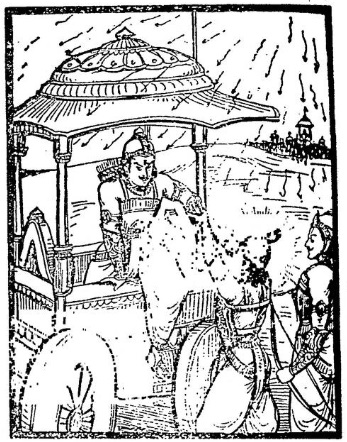
Lord Krishna dragging Bhima from his chariot to save him from the Narayanastra

Ashvatthama, a warrior in the epic Mahabharata, came into the possession of the astra, and used it against the Pandava forces. When it was used, the Ekadasha (Eleven) Rudras appeared in the sky to destroy the Pandavas. Millions of weapons such as chakras, gadas, and ultra-sharp arrows appeared and moved to destroy them; all those who resisted were killed. Krishna, who knew how to stop the Narayanastra, advised the Pandavas and their army to immediately drop their weapons and utterly surrender to the great astra of Narayana.

When targeted, the Pandava Bhima refused to surrender, considering it an act of cowardice, and attacked the downpour of fiery arrows. The Narayana weapon concentrated its shower on him, and he gradually became exhausted. However, he was not killed, as Krishna and his brothers eventually restrained him.

=== Ramayana ===
In the Ramayana, Rama and Meghanada possessed this weapon. He used the weapon in his last fight against Lakshmana, but the astra refused to harm the latter, as he was an incarnation of Adishesha.

=== Bhagavata Purana ===
Dhruva employs the astra during his invasion of Alaka, the realm of the yakshas:

Hearing this speech of the sages, Dhruva sipped some water as ācamana, and set to his bow the missile created by Nārāyaṇa.

— Bhagavata Purana, Book 4, Chapter 11

Krishna employs the astra against Shiva in his quest to rescue Aniruddha from Banasura:

He nullified Brahmāstra with a Brahmāstra, Vāyavyāstra (missile creating stormy winds) with Parvatāstra (a missile surrounding the winds by mountain-like obstacles), the Agnyastra (the fire missile) with the rain missile and Rudra’s special Pāśupata missile with his own Nārāyaṇāstra.

— Bhagavata Purana, Book 10, Chapter 63

== See also ==
- Pashupatastra
- Indrastra
- Brahmastra
