= Astra (weapon) =

Supernatural weapon in Hinduism

An astra (Sanskrit: अस्त्र, lit. 'weapon (that is thrown)/missile/bolt/arrow') is a supernatural weapon in Hindu epics. It is presided over by a specific deity and imbued with spiritual powers. The term came to denote any weapon that was released from the hand (such as an arrow), compared to holding it (such as a sword). The bearer of an astra is an astradhari (Sanskrit: अस्त्रधारी, romanized: astradhārī).

== History ==
Astras are supernatural weapons invoked using mantras. In battle, a warrior would use a mantra to convert any weapon (usually an arrow) into a divine weapon. Astras comprise four classes of weapons. The origin of Astras is elaborated in the Ahirbudhnya Samhita, a dialogue between Sage Narada and Shiva.

When Narada asks Shiva about the origin of Astras, the god recounts a story: Eons ago, before the universe was created, Vishnu assumed many forms for his own amusement. Eventually, he assumed the form of Brahma and created the universe. In order to protect the universe from wicked beings of his own creation, Vishnu created the Sudarshana Chakra. However, only he could wield the Chakra. Using the power of the Sudarshana Chakra, Vishnu created over one hundred Astras. They were categorised according to their origin–from Vishnu's mouth, chest, thighs, and feet, and other parts such as the chest, waist, and lower abdomen. The astras are also organized into two broader groups: pravartaka (offensive) and nivartaka (defensive).

== Summoning ==
To summon or use an astra requires a specific incantation. The deity would endow the weapon with supernatural powers, making it impossible to counter through regular means. Specific conditions existed involving the usage of astras, violating them could be fatal. Because of the power involved, the knowledge involving an astra was passed in the Guru-shishya tradition from a Guru (teacher) to a Shishya (pupil) by word of mouth, and only after the student's character had been established. Certain astras had to be handed down from the deity directly; knowledge of the incantation was insufficient.

== Hindu epics ==
Astras come into importance mainly in the Ramayana and Mahabharata, where they are used in the great battles. They are depicted as used by archers such as Parashurama, Rama, Lakshmana, Meghanada (Indrajit), Ravana, Krishna, Bhishma, Drona, Karna, Ashwatthama, Arjuna and other warriors. In the Ramayana and the Mahabharata, Rama and Krishna had more astras than any other warrior. It is believed that Rama possessed all the astras.

The divya ("divine") astras were generally invoked into arrows, although they could potentially be used with anything. Ashwatthama invoked Brahmaśirśāstra using a blade of grass as his weapon.

Astra	Deity	Effect
Brahmastra	Brahma	Brahma's celestial weapon. It could destroy entire armies at once and counter most other astras. It is an invincible supreme weapon in the Matsya Purana. It was the only weapon capable of piercing the Brahma kavacha, Brahma's invincible armour. Atikaya, one of Ravana's sons, possessed the armour that could only be pierced by a Brahmastra. He was killed by Lakshmana, brother of Rama, using a Brahmastra.
Trishula	Shiva	Shiva's trident. According to Shiva tradition, the trishula is the most powerful weapon in Hindu mythology, being infallible and capable of destroying anything except for Shiva and Parvati.
Sudarshana Chakra	Vishnu	Vishnu's celestial discus, created for him by Vishvakarma. Vaishnava traditions hold it to be the most powerful weapon in Hindu mythology. It is infallible and flies at Vishnu's command. It could be stopped only by Vishnu's wish. It was used by Krishna, Vishnu's eighth avatar, to behead his cousin Shishupala.
Vibhuti	Devi	Devi's celestial weapon, offered to Barbarika by a Brahmin, has the ability to "split the vital centre of the body of an enemy". It possesses ash that resembles saffron, and when it is released, it spills the ash on the vulnerable positions of the enemy combatants, not affecting allies. After the ash is spilled, arrows are released to destroy the enemy. Barbarika employed this in the Kurukshetra War, planning to singlehandedly defeat the Kaurava army, but was slain by Krishna before his plan could be carried out due to a previous life curse.
Indrastra	Indra	Indra's celestial weapon. It produces thousands of duplicates of itself and attacks the enemy with devastating effect, as employed by Arjuna in the Mahabharata. It is possessed by other warriors including Lakshmana, Meghanada, and Rama.
Vasavishakti	Indra	Indra's shakti (divine energy). When used, it kills the opponent, but it could only be used once. It was employed by Karna to kill Ghatotkacha in the Kurukshetra War.
Prasvapastra	Vasus	It causes the afflicted to fall asleep. In the Mahabharata, Bhishma was stopped by Narada from using this weapon against his guru, Parashurama. In the Ramayana, Rama has this weapon.
Agneyastra	Agni	Agni's celestial weapon. When discharged, it emits flames inextinguishable through normal means. Arjuna used it against Angaraparna, the gandharva. Aurva offered the astra to Sagara. During the Kurukshetra war, Ashvathama used it to reduce a whole Akshauhini of soldiers, horses, chariots and elephants to ashes.
Varunastra	Varuna	Varuna's celestial weapon. It released torrential volumes of water. This weapon is commonly mentioned as being used to counter the Agneyastra. It is possessed by Rama, Indrajit, Ravana, Lakshmana, Arjuna, Bhishma, and Drona.
Manavastra	Manu	Manu's celestial weapon. It carries the target hundreds of thousands of yojanas away and could inspire humane traits in an evil being. This weapon was used by Rama on the rakshasa Maricha in the Ramayana. Arjuna also possesses this weapon.
Varunapasha	Varuna	Varuna's noose. It bears seven loops, capable of torturing sinners and allowing no escape. Warriors including Rama, Indrajit and Arjuna possessed this weapon.
Bhaumastra	Bhumi	Bhumi's celestial weapon. The weapon could create tunnels deep into the earth and summon jewels. Arjuna has employed this astra in the Mahabharata.
Bhargavastra	Parashurama	Parashurama's celestial weapon. It is a mysterious weapon in Hindu mythology. No one knows about this weapon except for Parashurama and Karna. Karna uses this astra to counter the Indrastra in the Mahabharata.
Nagastra	Nagas	Celestial weapon associated with the Naga race. It has an unerring aim and takes the form of a snake which is deadly upon impact. Arjuna used this against Susharma, and Karna is also described as possessing it.
Nagapasha	Nagas	Noose associated with the Naga race. Upon impact, this weapon binds the target in coils of venomous snakes. In the Ramayana, Indrajit used it against Rama and Lakshmana. Arjuna obtained it from his wife Ulupi.
Garudastra	Garuda	Garuda's celestial weapon. It is commonly employed to counter the nagastra. It is possessed by Arjuna, and used by Rama in the Ramayana.
Anjalikastra	Indra	Celestial weapon affiliated with Indra. It was employed by Arjuna to behead Karna.
Vayavyastra	Vayu	Vayu's celestial weapon, which brings a gale capable of lifting armies off the ground. During the Kurukshetra War, Ashwatthama used it to penetrate the illusions made by Anjanaparvan. Arjuna uses this astra against Drona. Indrajit and Rama also had this weapon.
Suryastra	Surya	Surya's celestial weapon which produces a dazzling light that dispels any darkness and dries water bodies while discharging fire ,this weapon was wielded by Karna ,his son during his time in kurushketra..
Maghavana	Indra	Indra's celestial weapon. It is a swift and flaming weapon during crossfire, especially used in illusionary warfare. Arjuna obtained this weapon from Indra.
Vajra	Indra	Indra's personal thunderbolt which creates bolts of lightning. Indra gave this astra to his son Arjuna.
Mohiniastra	Mohini	Celestial weapon named for Mohini, the female avatar of Vishnu. It produces a mesmerising song and dispels maya or sorcery in the vicinity. Arjuna used this astra against the nivatakavachas and dispelled illusions created by them.
Tvashtarastra	Tvashtr	When used against a group of opponents (such as an army), causes them to mistake each other for enemies and fight each other. Only Arjuna and Rama possessed this weapon. It was created by Tvashtr, the divine builder and artisan.
Sammohana/Pramohana	Gandharva	Caused armies to collapse in a trance. Arjuna uses this weapon against the Kaurava army during the Virata war. On the 6th day of the Kurukshetra war, Dhrishtadyumna used it against the Kauravas, causing them to become unconscious, but Drona used his Prajnastra to stop its effect.
Parvatastra		Caused a parvata (mountain) to fall on the target from the skies. Arjuna possessed this astra.
Brahmashirastra	Brahma	Capable of killing devas. It was used by Ashwatthama on Parikshit. It is thought that the Brahmashirsha astra is an evolved version of the Brahmastra and a secret infallible weapon created by Brahma to be four times stronger than the Brahmastra. The Mahabharata reports that the weapon manifests with the four heads of Brahma on its tip. In the Mahabharata, it was wielded by Agnivesha, Bhishma, Drona, Karna, Kripa, Arjuna and Ashwatthama (Ashwatthama didn't have the knowledge to retract it). It could erase beings from the past, present and future.
Brahmadanda	Brahma	A defensive personal weapon and divine rod (danda) possessed only by Bhramana. Capable of repelling other higher-energy weapons. Used by Vashishta against Vishwamitra. It is used only for defence.
Narayanastra	Vishnu	Creates showers of arrows and discs. The astra's power increased with the resistance offered to it. This weapon had to be obtained from Vishnu's Narayana form directly, and could be used only once. It is one of the most powerful weapons. Any attempt to invoke it a second time rebounds on the user and his troops. In Mahabharata era, Vishnu in Narayana form blessed Drona with this weapon. Drona subsequently presented this astra to his son Ashwatthama. In the Mahabharata war, Ashwatthama used this weapon against the Pandava army after Drona's death. It destroyed Akshauhini of the Pandava army. The only way to escape is total submission, which prompts the weapon to spare the target as stated by Krishna. When it was used, Ekadasha (Eleven) Rudras appeared in the sky to destroy the targets. Millions of types of weapons, including Chakras, Gadhas, and ultra sharp arrows appeared in a rage to destroy the target or an opposing army. Whoever resists it is destroyed.
Vaishnavastra	Vishnu	Destroyed its target, irrespective of the target's nature. It must be obtained from Vishnu directly. The only counter was to invoke another Vaishnavastra to counter the attacking Vaishnavastra or for the presiding deity to stop the Vaishnavastra. In the Mahabharata, Narakasura, Bhagadatta, and Krishna had this weapon. Bhagadatta used this weapon on Arjuna, but Krishna stood up before Arjuna to retrieve the weapon. Rama used this weapon to destroy the energy of Bharghava Rama.
Kaumodaki	Vishnu	Vishnu's divine mace, which destroyed whole armies and was infallible and without parallel. Krishna slayed the demon Dantavakra with it.
Sharanga	Vishnu	Vishnu's bow, also called the Vaishnava dhanush, was used by Rama, then Krishna.
Nandaka	Vishnu	Visnu's sacred sword, which had an indestructible blade. It was used by Krishna to kill countless demons.
Vijaya	Shiva	Celestial weapon made by Vishvakarma for Shiva. It was given to Parashurama, who gave it to Karna, impressed by his skills and he used it till the 16 th day,this bow later AS claimed by Yudhistira. The only time Karna ever fought using the Vijaya dhanush was on the 17th day of the Kurukshetra war when he fought against Arjuna and met his fate with Anjalikastra.
Pinaka	Shiva	Shiva's bow, also called Shiva dhanush, which he used to kill countless asuras in battle (Tripura was destroyed by Shiva using the Pinaka). It was given to Parashurama By Shiva.
Maheshvarastra	Shiva	The power of Shiva's third eye. It shoots a fiery beam that can turn even celestial beings to ash. It has the power to turn the entire world to ash. Lakshmana employed it against Indrajit. In Dwapar Yuga, only Arjuna possessed it.
Rudrastra	Shiva	Contains the power of a Rudra. When it is used, it invokes the power of Rudra out of the Ekadasha (Eleven) Rudras and destroys the target. In the Mahabharata, Arjuna uses it against 30 million Nivatakavachas and Kalakeyas. Only Arjuna possessed this weapon in the Mahabharata.
Pashupatastra	Shiva	One of the most powerful astras. Every time it was summoned, its head was different. It summons monsters and a huge spirit which personifies the weapon. It can destroy any target, irrespective of its nature. This astra could destroy the world. In Dvapara Yuga, only Arjuna possessed Pashupatastra. In Treta Yuga, sage Vishwamitra possessed this weapon
Vidyudabhi	Shiva	The Vidyudabhi was an unconquerable and indestructible Parashu (axe) given to Parashurama by Shiva, along with other divine weapons. Parashurama later gave this axe to Ganesha. Parashurama means Rama, who wields the axe, as Rama was the name Parashurama was known by until he acquired the axe from Shiva.
Chandrahasa	Shiva	The divine sword. Has-laugh, literally 'the laughter of the moon', but referring to the shape formed by a crescent moon which resembles a smile) was given to Ravana with a warning that if it was used for unjust causes, it would return to the three-eyed Shiva and Ravana's days would be numbered.
Gandiva	Brahma	This invincible bow was created by Brahma, who created the universe. Brahma held it for a thousand years, then Prajapati held it for five hundred and three years, Indra, for five hundred and eighty years, and Soma for five hundred years. After that, Varuna held it for a hundred years before handing it to Arjuna along with a Kapi/Hanuman-bannered chariot, and two inexhaustible quivers, as requested by Agni during the Khandava-daha Parva. The bow was decorated with hundreds of gold bosses and had radiant ends. The bow was worshiped by Devas, Gandharvas and Danavas. No person other than Arjuna could wield the Gandiva and Arjuna was wielder of Gandiva then he came to be known as gandivdhari (carrier of gandiva bow).
Sabdavedastra		Prevents an opponent from turning invisible. Used by Arjuna against Gandharva king Chitrasena. In the Mahabharata, only Karna, Arjuna and Krishna knew about this weapon.
Antardhanastra	Kubera	The Antardhanastra would make things, people, or entire places disappear. This astra was given to Arjuna by Kubera.
Prajnastra		This weapon was used to restore a person's senses and thoughts. It was a good counter to the Sammohana Astra. Warriors like Arjuna and Drona used this astra in war.
Sailastra	Vayu	The Sailastra was used to make heavy winds disappear, making it the counter to Vayvayastra, the wind weapon. It was possessed by warriors Rama, Krishna, Indrajit and Arjuna.
Visoshana	Indra	The Visoshana was the drying weapon which could dry anything. It was an amazing counter to the Varunastra. Arjuna obtained this weapon from Indra in heaven.
Jyotikshastra	Surya	The Jyotikshastra could brighten a dark area. Arjuna and karna had this astra in the Mahabharata.
Sauparna		The Sauparnatra would invoke Garuda. Hence, it was a good counter to the Nagastra. It was used by Susharma in the Mahabharata war when Arjuna used the Nagastra on the Sampshapataka army.
Govardhana	Vishnu	Powerful bow of Vishnu. During the Mahabharata, Vishnu gave Vidura this bow.
Barbarika's Teen Baan	Shiva	This astra is considered to be Amogh i.e infallible as it cannot be countered by anything. This Teen Baan means Three Arrows that are used as the weapons and they come with certain rules. The first arrow is used to mark things, objects, people or opponents that we want to attack. The second arrow is used to mark the things, objects, people or opponents that we don’t want attack. The third arrow actually does the attack and destroys everything that is marked by first leaving everything that is marked by third arrow. It was possessed by Barbarika (Ghatotkacha’s Son). This astra was given to Barbarik by Lord Shiva himself.
Chandrastra	Soma (Moon god)	When is used it can produce freezing cold and also it is the best counter to Suryastra as it can cancel out the heat created by Suryastra.
Vel	Kartikeya	The Vel is the divine spear or lance associated with Kartikeya (also known as Murugan), the Hindu god of war, and is a symbol of his power, valor, and victory, often depicted as being given to him by his mother Parvati. According to Shaiva tradition, the goddess Parvati gifted the vel to her son Kartikeya, as an embodiment of her shakti, to vanquish the asura Surapadman. The Skanda Purana mentions that when Kartikeya faced the asura Surapadma, the latter turned into a mango tree, which was then split in half by Kartikeya using his vel.

== See also ==
- Astras of Arjuna
- Ramayana
- The Mahabharata
- Bhagavata Purana
