= Urvashi =

Apsara in Hindu mythology

- Apsara
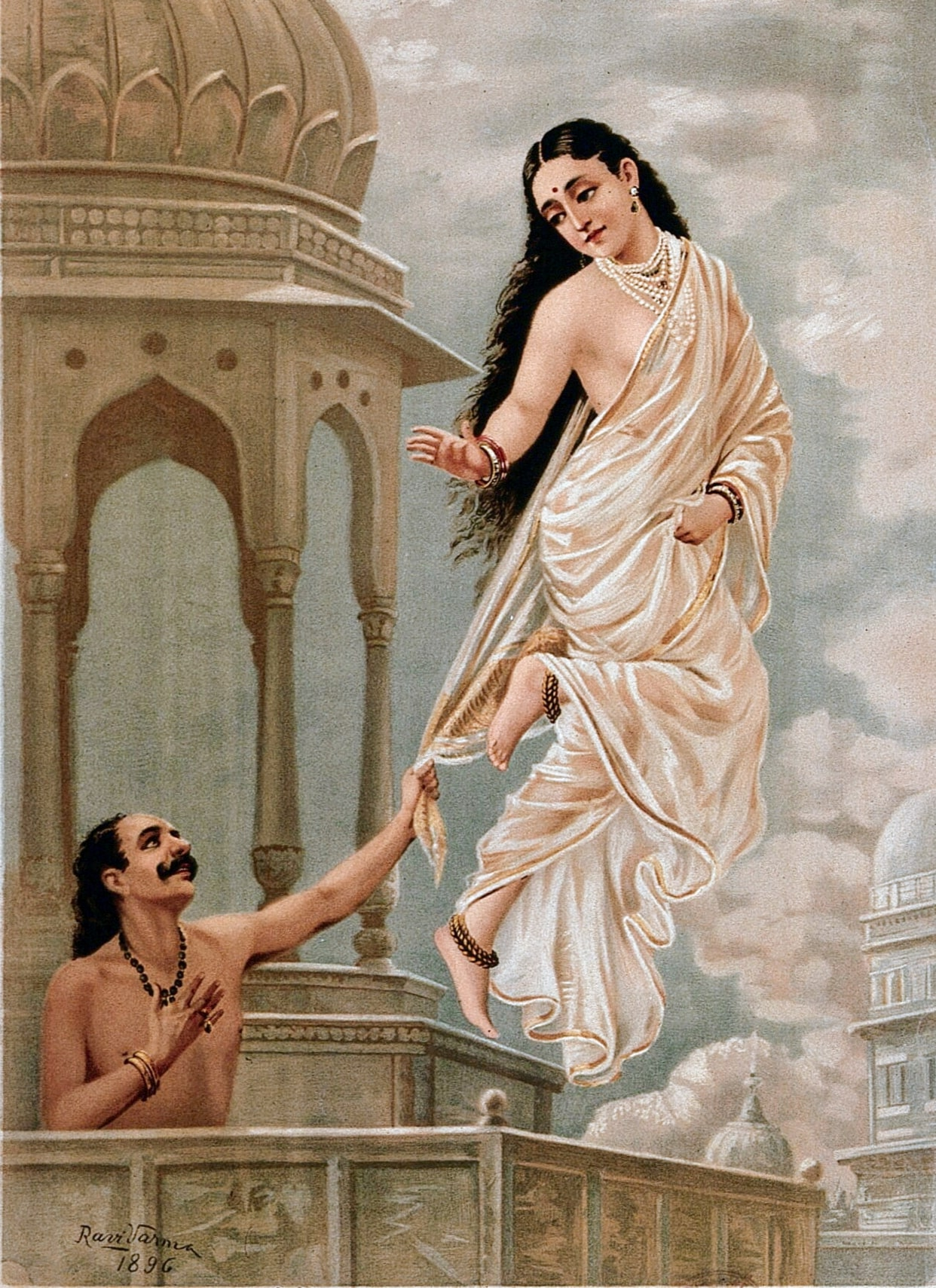
- Urvashi leaving her husband Pururavas, a chromolithograph by Raja Ravi Varma
- Devanagari: उर्वशी
- Sanskrit transliteration: Urvaśī
- Abode: Svarga
- Texts: Rigveda, Mahabharata, Ramayana, Puranas, Vikramorvashiyam

Genealogy
- Spouse: Pururavas
- Children: Ayus, Dhimat, Amavasu, Dhridhayus, Vanayus, and Satayus (from Pururavas) (Note: Alternative listing of the names—Ayus, Shrutayus, Satyayus, Raya, Vijaya and Jaya); Vasishtha and Agastya (from Mitra-Varuna)

Urvashi (Sanskrit: उर्वशी, IAST: Urvaśī) is the most prominent apsara mentioned in the Hindu scriptures like the Vedas, the epics Ramayana and Mahabharata, as well as the Puranas. She is regarded as the most beautiful of all the apsaras, and an expert dancer.

Urvashi has been featured in many mythological events. She emerged out of the thigh of sage Narayana and occupies a special place in the court of Indra, the king of the gods and ruler of svarga. She is famous for her marriage with Pururavas, the first king of the legendary Chandravansha, whom she later abandoned. She also plays a significant part in the birth of Vashishtha and Agastya, two of the most revered sages in Hinduism. Urvashi's story has been an inspiration for various arts, performances and literature. The poet Kalidasa (fl. 4th -5th century CE) has adapted Urvashi and Pururavas as the main characters in his play Vikramorvashiyam.

== Etymology ==
The Sanskrit name "Urvaśī" is derived from roots—uru and aś. It can have multiple meanings. Indologist Monier Monier-Williams states that the name means 'widely pervasive' and he suggests that in its first appearances in Vedic texts Urvashi was a personification of dawn. According to the scripture Devi Bhagavata Purana, the apsara is known as Urvashi because she is born from the uru—'thigh'—of the divine-sage Narayana. Some scholars believe that the name has a non-Aryan origin.

== Literary background ==
Urvashi is the apsara to be specially named in the Rigveda, the oldest known Hindu scripture which was composed around 1900–1200 BCE. The 95th Sukta (section) of the 10th Mandala of the Rigveda is dedicated to a conversation between her and her husband, Pururavas. Urvashi remains a prominent figure in later texts. Her myth is retold and expanded in many later Hindu scriptures, like the Shatapatha Brahmana, Brihaddevata, Mahabharata, Ramayana, Harivamsa, Vayu Purana, Vishnu Purana, Matsya Purana, Bhagavata Purana, Devi-Bhagavata Purana, Padma Purana and Skanda Purana.

Urvashi has been dramatized and adapted by many poets and authors. Among these, the most popular one is the play Vikramorvashiyam by the Sanskrit poet Kalidasa, who probably lived in 4th - 5th century Gupta Period. The drama depicts the love of Urvashi and Pururavas, but the plot is very different from that told in the scriptures. Indian poet Rabindranath Tagore (1861–1941) has also written a poem about Urvashi.

== Mythology ==
=== Birth ===
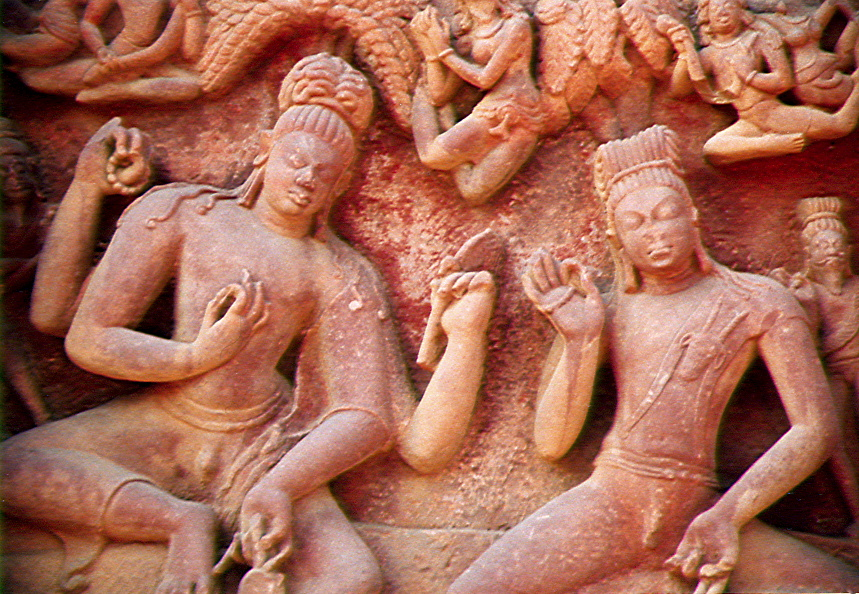
A relief depicting Narayana (left) and Nara (right), Deogarh, Uttar Pradesh, ca. 5th century CE

In Hindu mythology, Urvashi sprang from the divine-sage Narayana's thigh as a fully fledged maiden. According to the Devi-Bhagavata Purana, the sage-brothers Nara and Narayana perform penance to please the creator god Brahma, but this makes Indra (the king of the devas) insecure about his throne and he does not want the sages to acquire divine powers. As a result, he creates multiple illusions to break their penance, but all of his tricks fail. Finally, he orders the apsaras of his court, including Rambha, Menaka, and Tilottama, to go to Nara-Narayana and distract them through seduction. Accompanied by the god of love, Kama, and his consort, Rati, the apsaras go to Nara-Narayana, and start to dance seductively in front of them. However, the sages remain unaffected by this and decide to break the pride of the apsaras. Narayana slaps his thigh, from which Urvashi emerges. Her beauty leaves Indra's apsaras matchless, and they become ashamed of their evil act. Nara and Narayana assure Indra that they would not take his throne, and gift Urvashi to him. She occupied the place of pride in Indra’s court.

=== Birth of Vasishtha and Agastya ===
Urvashi plays a significant role in the birth of the sages—Vasishtha and Agastya—due to which she is sometimes referred to as their mother. The legend is narrated in many scriptures. In the Rigveda, the gods Varuna and Mitra once perform a yajna (fire-sacrifice), when Urvashi arrives in front of them. After seeing her, they become sexually aroused and ejaculate their semen into a pitcher from which Vasishtha and Agastya are born. Similar accounts of this story appear in the Brihaddevata and some Puranic scriptures.

In later Hindu texts, unlike the Vedas, Vashishtha is described as a Manasputra (mind-created son) of the god Brahma. After his death from the king Nimi's curse, he takes rebirth through Urvashi and Mitra-Varuna. According to the legend attested in the Uttara Kanda of the Ramayana, Vashishtha's spirit is consoled by Brahma after his death by telling him that he won't be born again in a womb. So Vashishtha is told to enter the body of Mitra-Varuna. Following their encounter, Varuna approaches Urvashi and expresses his wish to have a union with her. She declines it, nevertheless, as she had already promised Mitra that she would court him. To satisfy his desire, Varuna ejaculates inside a celestial jar that Brahma had made; Urvashi gets passionate, and tells him that though her body belonged to Mitra, her mind was fixed on him. As a result of her infidelity, Mitra curses Urvashi to become the wife of a mortal man, which eventually causes Mitra's seed to fall from her womb. It is subsequently put into the same jar containing Varuna's seed. In addition to Vashishtha's rebirth, Agastya is also born from the pitcher.

=== Wife of Pururavas ===
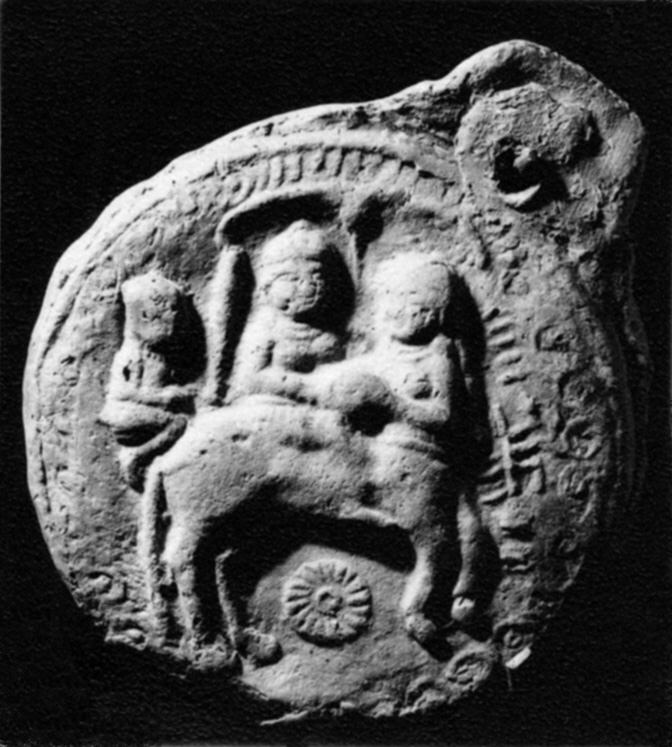
An emblem depicting Pururavas and Urvashi, 1st century BCE - 1st century CE.

The most prominent myth featuring Urvashi is about her marriage to Pururavas, a mortal king who is credited as the founder of Chandravamsha (lit. 'lunar dynasty'), a legendary dynasty in ancient India. The myth is first narrated in the Rigveda, where it is presented in the form of dialogue between them. The Vedic hymn suggest that she has left her husband Pururavas after living for four years with him. The king beseeches her to return, but she harshly refuses, complaining that he made too much love with her. She advises him to do good deeds to ascend to heaven and reunite with her. The context for this scene is provided in subsequent texts. Scholars note that while in Rigveda Urvashi is portrayed as being a self-willed and unyielding woman who married Pururavas for her own desire and abandons him after giving birth to their son, the later adaptations mark her for her love for Pururavas and blame the celestial beings for their separation.

The Post-Vedic texts attest that Urvashi falls in love with handsome and heroic Pururavas and the latter also reciprocates his feelings for her. After Urvashi is cursed to descend on the Earth and become the wife of a mortal, she marries Pururavas on some conditions, with the most important being that he would never appear naked before her apart from during coitus. In the Shatapatha Brahmana, Urvashi lays down two conditions that Pururavas would make love with her regularly, but only when she consented, and he would never appear naked in front of her. In the Puranas, three conditions are mentioned—Pururavas would never appear naked in front of her, he would protect her two pet sheep and she would only consume ghee (clarified butter). According to Vishnu Purana and Bhagavata Purana, the marriage was due to the curse of Mitra, while in the Devi Bhagavata Purana the curse is attributed to Brahma. Urvashi spends many years enjoying amorous sports with Pururavas. Meanwhile, Urvashi's presence is missed in heaven. A group of Gandharvas (celestial musicians), led by Vishvavasu, are instructed to bring her back to heaven. One night when Urvashi and Pururavas are busy making love, the Gandharvas abduct Urvashi's pet lambs that were tied to her bed, and hearing their cries, Urvashi rebukes Pururavas for not protecting them. In haste, Pururavas forgets that he is naked, and stands up to chase the sheep. The Gandharvas then illuminate the place with a bolt of lightning, leading to Urvashi seeing Pururavas naked. Pururavas manages to bring back the sheep but Urvashi vanishes. Grief-sickened, he searches for her across the country and finds her disguised as a swan in a lake. He supplicates her to return but she refuses. Seeing his sorrow, Urvashi reveals that she is pregnant with their child and instructs him to return to the same place the next year so that they could spend that night together. Urvashi would return once every year to him and bore six sons—Ayus, Shrutayus, Satyayus, Raya, Vijaya, and Jaya. The Adi Parva of Mahabharata mentions different names of these six sons - Ayus, Dhimat, Amavasu and Dhridhayus, Vanayus, and Satayus. Following their birth, Urvashi suggests Pururavas to perform penance to transform himself into a Gandharva and ascend to heaven. Pururavas successfully accomplishes the task and is able to reunite with Urvashi in heaven.

=== Other legends ===
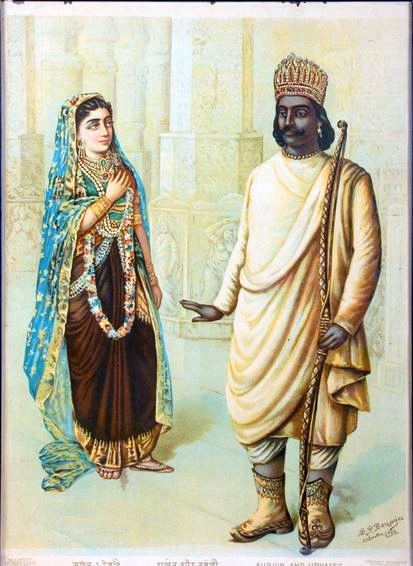
Arjuna rejects Urvashi, print by B.P. Banerjee

In the Vayu Purana, the sage Agastya once arrives in Indra's court and is welcomed by a dance performance of Urvashi. In the performance, Urvashi and Jayanta, the son of Indra, look into each other's eyes in love. The distracted Urvashi misses a beat, and the dance goes haywire. Due to this, Jayanta is cursed to be born as bamboo, and Urvashi is cursed to take birth on Earth as a woman named Madhavi.

Urvashi is said to have caused the birth of the sage Rishyashringa. According to the Mahabharata, Urvashi is traveling on the banks of a river, when rishi Vibhandaka, son of Kashyapa, sees her and becomes aroused by her beauty and has seminal emissions. His seed comes in contact with a doe, who turns out be an apsara cursed to remain in that form till she gives birth to a boy. She gives birth to Rishyashringa, and he is raised by his father.

Another tale featuring Urvashi and a mortal prince is found in the Mahabharata. (Note: This tale is excluded in the Critical Edition of the Mahabharata and has been regarded by scholars as a later interpolation to the epic.) Arjuna, a prince belonging to Chandravamsha and the spiritual son of Indra, comes to heaven to learn under Gandharva Chitrasena. Urvashi becomes attracted to him and reaches Arjuna's residence adorned in beautiful attire. She tells him about her desire, but the latter jilts her advances, considering her to be an ancestor of his, as well as a mother, because of her past marriage to Pururavas. Urvashi tries to convince him to accept her by telling that Apsaras are free and unconfined in their choice, and they can sport with any man they wish. Arjuna still refuses and an enraged Urvashi curses him to be destitute of his manhood and to be scorned as a eunuch for one year. Indra later pacifies Arjuna that the curse would be beneficial for him during his Agyatavasa (incognito exile).

== See also ==
- Swan maiden
- Melusine
