= Pururavas =

King in Hindu tradition

- King of the Lunar dynasty
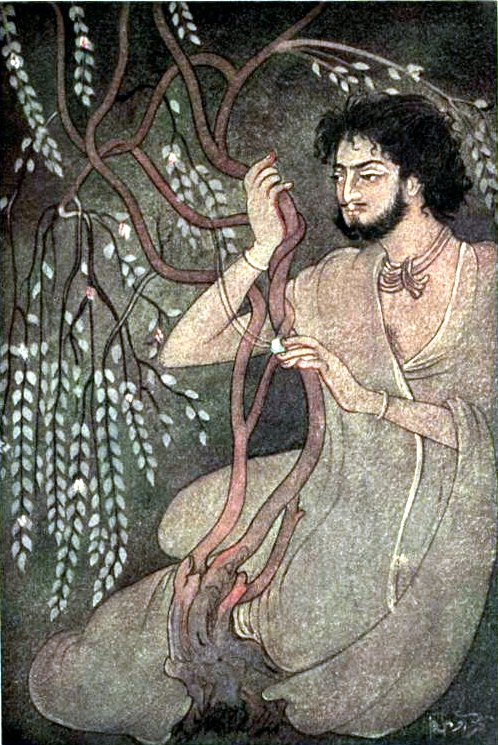
- A 20th century illustration of Pururavas
- Predecessor: Dynasty founded
- Successor: Ayus
- Texts: Rigveda, Mahabharata, Puranas, Vikramorvashiyam

Genealogy
- Parents: Ila (mother); Budha (father)
- Spouse: Urvashi
- Offspring: Ayus, Dhimat, Amavasu, Dhridhayus, Vanayus, and Satayus (from Pururavas); (Note: Alternative listing of the names—Ayus, Shrutayus, Satyayus, Raya, Vijaya and Jaya)
- Dynasty: Chandravamsha

Pururavas (Sanskrit: पुरूरवस् IAST: Purūravas, nominative singular: पुरूरवा IAST: Purūravā), is a character in Hindu literature, a king who served as the first of the Lunar dynasty.

According to the Vedas, he is a legendary entity associated with Sūrya (the sun) and Uṣā (the dawn), and is believed to reside in the middle region of the cosmos. The Ṛg Veda (X.95.18) states that he was a son of Ilā and was a pious ruler. However, the Mahābhārata states that Ila/Ilā was both his mother and his father. According to the Viṣṇu Purāṇa and others, his father was Budha, and he was ancestor of the tribe of Purūravas, from whom descended the Yādavas, Kauravas, and the Pāṇḍavas.

== Legends ==
=== Birth and early life ===
Pururavas was born in Treta Yuga, as the son of Budha and Ila. Budha was the son of Chandra, the moon god, and thus Pururavas was the first Chandravamsha King. Since he was born on Mount Puru, he was called Pururavas.

=== Reign ===
According to the Puranas, Pururavas reigned from Pratisthana (Prayaga). He performed a penance to Brahma and as a reward, he was made the sovereign of the whole earth. Pururavas celebrated a hundred Ashwamedha Yajnas. The asuras were his followers, while the devas were his friends.

According to the Mahabharata, Pururavas was the one to bring three kinds of fire on the earth (for sacrificial purpose) from the region of Gandharvas, where he met Urvashi and fell in love with her. In the Sambhava Parva, Pururavas is said to be intoxicated with his powers, and he quarreled with the Brahmanas. Sanatkumara came from the region of Brahma to counsel him. But Pururavas turned deaf ear to the counsel. Angered by this, the sages cursed Pururavas and he was destroyed.

=== Pururavas and Urvashi ===
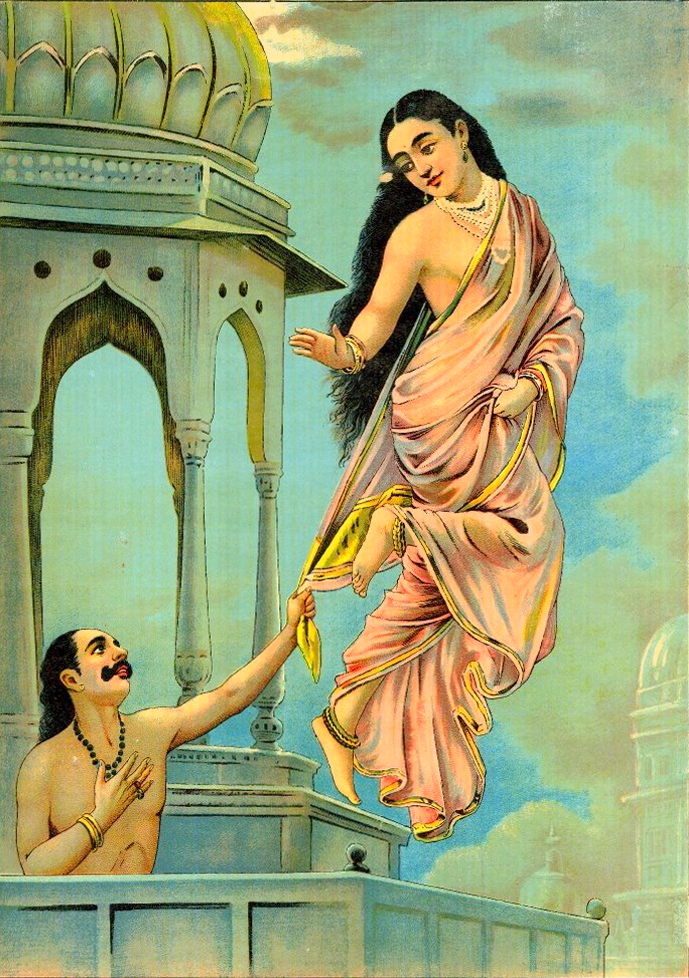
Urvashi and Pururavas, a painting by Raja Ravi Varma

Once, Pururavas, and Urvashi, an apsara, fell in love with each other. Pururavas asked her to become his wife, but she agreed on three or two conditions. The most retold conditions are that Pururavas would protect Urvashi's pet sheep and they would never see one another naked (apart from love making).

Pururavas agreed the conditions and they lived happily. Indra started missing Urvashi and he created circumstances where the conditions were broken. First he sent some gandharvas to kidnap the sheep, when the couple was making love. When Urvashi heard her pets' cries, she scolded Pururavas for not keeping his promise. Hearing her harsh words, Pururavas forgot that he was naked and ran after the sheep. Just then, Indra flashed lightning, and Urvashi saw her husband naked. After the events, Urvashi returned to heaven, and left Pururavas heartbroken. Urvashi descended upon the earth and bore Pururavas many children, but they were not completely reunited.

== Descendants ==
He had six (or seven or eight according to different accounts) sons. The names of these sons are: Ayu (or Ayus), Amavasu, Vishvayu, Shrutayu, Shatayu (or Satayu), and Dridhayu. Nahusha, the son of Ayu, is a well-known name in the Rigveda.

== Narrative of Urvashi and Purūravas ==
The earlier version of the narrative of Urvashi and Pururavas is found in the Rigveda (X.95.1–18) and the Śatapaṭha Brāhmaṇa (XI.5.1). The later versions are found in the Mahābhārata, the Harivaṃsa, the Viṣṇu Purāṇa, the Matsya Purāṇa, and the Bhāgavata Purāṇa.

=== Vedic literature ===
The Ṛg-veda, X.129 contains a conversational fragment, written in a highly wrought poetic style. The hymn suggests that Uṣas (also known as Urvaśi) is a Gandharvi or Apsara (a heavenly nymph). Having been united with a human king, Purūravas, and after living together for four autumns, suddenly left him on his unintentional violation of the stipulated conditions of the union. Later Purūravas made futile entreaties to her to return to him.

The narrative displays multiple levels of symbolism by playing on the multiplicity of meanings in the Vedic Saṃskṛta terms. While it is a love poem, expressing the conflict of interest between a lover and his beloved, who spurns his love, it also expresses the immortal relationship between the Sun (Purūravas) and the Dawn (Uṣas). In addition to these two levels of meaning, it also offers mantric prescriptions for a ritual activity bent on taking rebirth as a Gandharva or Apsaras.

=== Later Literature ===
The love story of king Pururavas and celestial nymph Urvashi is found in the Sanskrit drama, Vikramōrvaśīyam, written by the poet Kalidasa. The story is more dramatized like the addition of Pururavas another wife and with variations from the original story.

== In popular culture ==
Gudipati Venkata Chalam has authored the drama Purūravä, which has gained critical acclaim with the Telugu audience. This drama has been modernized in Purūravä, an animated version of the drama released in Amazon Prime in US and UK.

== Sources ==
- A Dictionary of Hindu Mythology & Religion by John Dowson
