= Ashvatthama =

Son of Drona in the Hindu epic Mahabharata

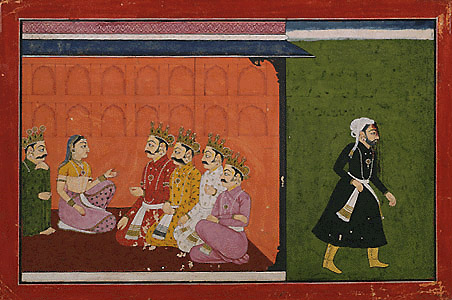
- Ashvatthama (right) departs after surrendering to Draupadi and the Pandavas, 18th century Pahari miniature

Information
- Affiliation: Kaurava alliance
- Weapon: Bow and Arrow, Sword
- Family: Drona (father); Kripi (mother)
- Relatives: Kripa (maternal uncle); Bharadvaja (paternal grandfather)

Ashvatthama (IAST: Aśvatthāmā, also spelt as Ashwatthama and Ashvatthaman) is one of the major characters in the ancient Hindu epic Mahabharata. He is the son of Drona, the royal preceptor to the Kuru princes—the Pandavas and the Kauravas. Ashvatthama is a close companion of Duryodhana, the leader of the Kauravas, and receives military training alongside the Kuru princes under the tutelage of his father.

Favoured by his father, Ashvatthama is entrusted with the knowledge of several celestial weapons, including the Narayanastra and the Brahmashirastra. During the Kurukshetra War between the Pandavas and the Kauravas, he fights on the side of the Kauravas and emerges as one of the three surviving warriors from their faction by the war’s conclusion.

On the night following the eighteenth day of battle, after the war has formally concluded, Ashvatthama temporarily gains supernatural strength and weapon after a sacrifice to the god Shiva. He launches a night raid on the Pandava camp and kills Dhrishtadyumna—the commander-in-chief of the Pandava army, who beheaded Drona during the war—and remaining warriors including the sons of Draupadi, the queen of the Pandavas. In response the Pandavas pursue him, and upon being confronted, Ashvatthama releases the Brahmashirastra. Unable to recall the weapon, Ashvatthama instead targets the Pandava lineage and Pandavas' women including Uttara—who is pregnant with Parikshit. Although the child dies, Krishna later revives him. As punishment for his actions, Krishna curses Ashvatthama to wander the earth for three thousand years, afflicted by isolation, suffering and decay. He retreats to forests afterwards.

== Etymology and epithets ==
The name Aśvatthāmā (Sanskrit: अश्वत्थामा) is derived from the Sanskrit components aśva (horse) and sthāman (strength or presence), with the name often interpreted as "the one who has the strength or voice of a horse" or "one who is steadfast as a horse". Alternate grammatical forms such as Aśvatthāman (Sanskrit: अश्वत्थामन्) also appear in Sanskrit literature. According to the Adi Parva of the epic, at the moment of his birth, Ashvatthama emitted a loud cry that resembled the neighing of the celestial horse Uccaishravas. A divine voice from the heavens then proclaimed that he should be named Ashvatthama.

In the Mahabharata, Ashvatthama is referred to by several epithets, which include Ācāryanandana, Ācāryaputra, Ācāryasuta, Ācāryatanaya, Ācāryasattama, Drauṇi, Drauṇāyani, Droṇaputra, Droṇasūnu, Guruputra, Gurusuta, and Bhāratācāryaputra—all of which reference his descent from his father, Drona.

== Biography ==
=== Birth and Early life ===
Ashvatthama is mentioned as a combined incarnation of deities Shiva, Yama, Kama, and Krodha, and has a divine gem on his forehead which gives him extraordinary powers. He is born to Drona, a Brahmana descended from the sage Bharadvaja, and his wife Kripi, the sister of Kripa descending from sage Gautama. Ashvatthama's birth is marked by supernatural signs. As soon as he is born, a celestial voice proclaimes his name, likening his cry to the neighing of the divine horse Uchchaihshravas.

Ashvatthama grows up in poverty and is once found weeping after seeing wealthy children drink milk, while he is given water mixed with powdered rice (pishtodaka) as milk. From childhood, Ashvatthama is taught warfare by Drona, who himself learnt it from other warrior-brahmins Agnivesha and Parashurama. When Drona is employed by the Kuru royal family to teach warfare to its princes—the hundred Kauravas brothers and the five Pandavas, Ashvatthama joins them in the ashrama. Ashvatthama soon excels in secret mystical knowledge (rahasyeshu), weaponry and military arts. In certain versions of the epic, it is attested that Drona, exhibiting deep paternal affection for his son Ashvatthama, seeks to provide him with specialized instruction in archery. He conducts these exclusive lessons during intervals when the other disciples are engaged in collecting water for the ashram. The Pandava prince Arjuna, upon discerning this arrangement, expedites his own tasks to gain access to the additional training sessions. Consequently, both Arjuna and Ashvatthama acquire a level of martial expertise that surpasses that of their peers.

=== Adulthood ===
After completion of his pupils' training, Drona arranges a weapon show, in which Ashwathama is present during discussions and demonstrations of weapons (astras). Here, he is mentioned as separating Bhima and Duryodhana. Ashvatthama participates in Draupadi’s svayaṃvara and is seen accompanying Duryodhana afterward. Later, He also attends the Rājasūya sacrifice of Yudhishthira, where he is noted among the elite guests present and is in charge of receiving Brahmins during the ceremony.

During the Pandavas' 13th year of exile, Ashvathama accompanies the Kaurava army to attack Matsya kingdom. Here, he rebukes Karna for criticizing Droṇa and is stationed by Bhīṣma’s left during the formations. In battle scenes, when his father is engaged in a fierce duel with Arjuna, Ashvatthama comes to Drona's aid, but is overpowered by Arjuna once his arrows are exhausted and is rescued by Karna.

He is present during multiple councils before Kurukshetra War. He is present during Sanjaya's return to Hastinapura and he is present in Dhritarashtra’s assembly. Ashvatthama praises Arjuna and states that he does not wish for war. Bhishma praises Ashvatthama in the same section, Ashvatthama further takes part in diplomatic discussions when Krishna arrives with Pandavas' peace proposal. When peace talks fail, Ashvatthama joins the Kaurava side along with his father.

Ashvatthama is described as raktoshniṣaḥ—he wears a red headwrap bears—and his banner marked with a lion’s tail (simhalungulaketana). He is classified as a Maharathi.

=== Kurukshetra war ===
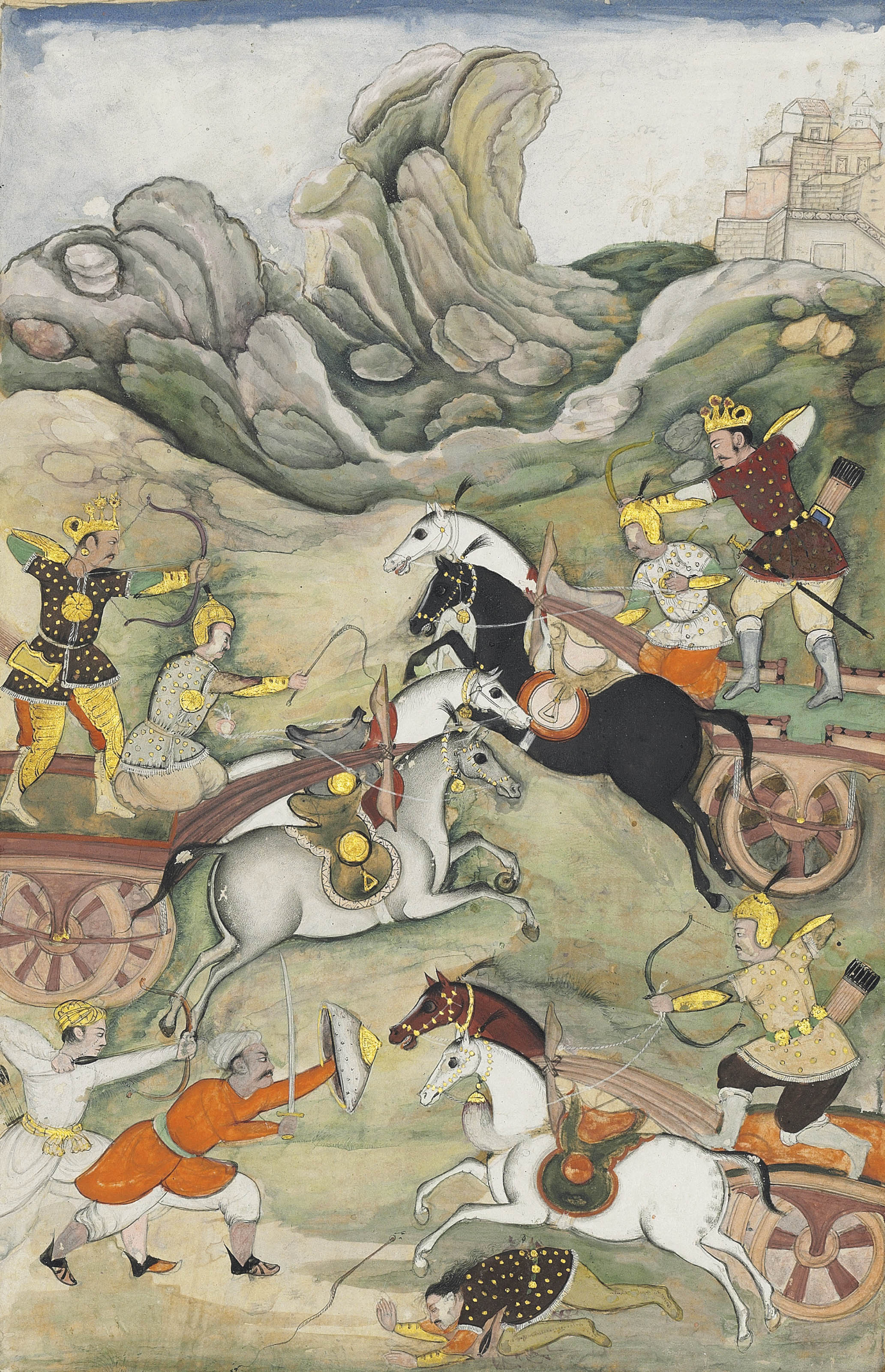
A folio from the Razmnama (Persian translation of the Mahabharata) depicting a battle between Dhrishtadyumna and Ashvatthama, c. 1598

==== Bhishma Parva ====
On the first day, Ashvatthama engages in combat with Shikhandin and assists Bhishma in his battle against Arjuna. On the second day, he fights under the command of Bhishma, joining Shalya and Kripa in fighting Dhrishtadyumna. He appears again prominently on the third day, stationed alongside Kripa at the head of the Garuda formation, and later participates in the battle against Abhimanyu. Continuing into the sixth day, Ashvatthama, with Kripa, occupies the "eye" of the Krauncha formation. On the seventh day, he again clashes with Shikhandin. His engagements become more intensive on the eighth day, where he is among those who rescue Duryodhana from Ghatotkacha and fights both Nila and Ghatotkacha, the latter of whom uses illusions (maya) against him. By the ninth day, Ashvatthama, joined by Somadatta and the two Avantyas, holds the left wing of the Kaurava army and engages in duels with Satyaki and Arjuna. On the tenth day, he plays a protective role for Bhishma, wounding Virata and Drupada in the process. That day also features a prophetic warning from his father Drona about ominous signs and Arjuna’s growing invincibility.

==== Drona Parva ====
On the twelfth day, Ashvatthama kills Nila and engages in combat with Bhimasena. On the thirteenth day, he stands at the forefront of the chakravyuha formation led by Duryodhana and others, where he both wounds and is wounded by Abhimanyu during the latter’s valiant but fatal attempt to break the formation. Ashvatthama continues to fight on the fourteenth day, participating in intense engagements against Arjuna alongside Karna and Duryodhana. Despite his efforts, he fails to prevent Satyaki from killing Bhurishravas and later joins the battle following Jayadratha’s death, aiding Kripa in resisting Arjuna. Later that same day, Ashvatthama clashes with both Satyaki and Ghatotkacha, killing the latter’s son and destroying his chariot. He combats several Rakshasas and slays Drupada’s sons, including Suratha and Shrutayudha. These feats earn him praise from celestial beings. Amid internal discord, he rebukes Karna for insulting Kripa but is eventually calmed by Duryodhana. Ashvatthama provides tactical support to Karna, seeks to temper Duryodhana’s rashness, and displays notable valor against the Panchalas and Kaikayas. He takes part in the fierce resistance against Yudhishthira and his forces. Though wounded by Ghatotkacha, he recovers and succeeds in driving him away.

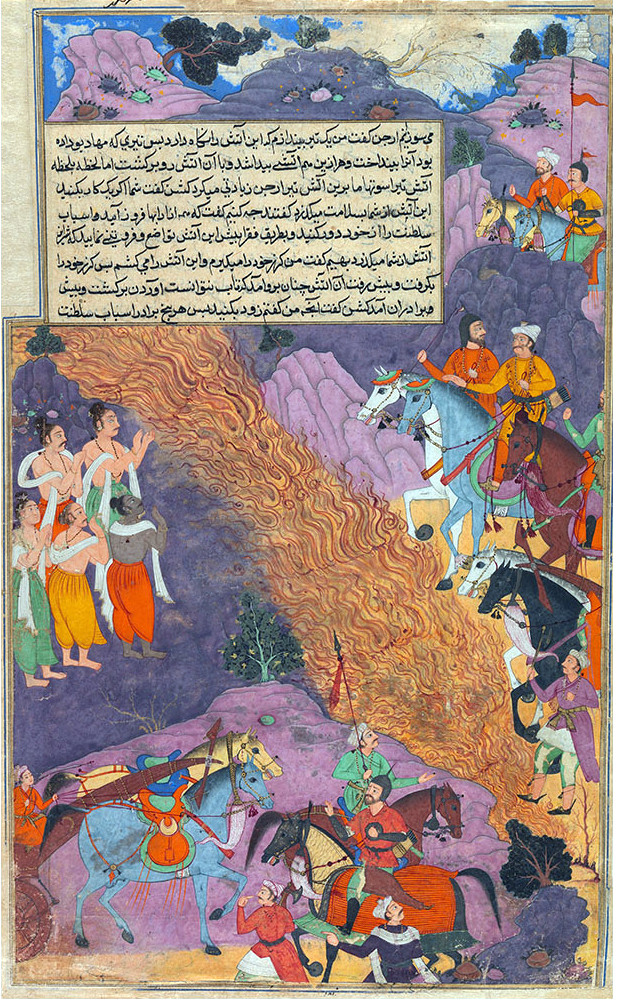
An illustration from Razmnama depicting Ashvatthama firing Narayanastra, c. 16th century

A pivotal moment unfolds on the fifteenth day during the Dronavadha Parva, when a false rumor of Ashvatthama’s death is spread, leading Drona to lay down his weapons and submit to death, before being beheaded by Dhrishtadyumna. In the aftermath, as described in the Narayanastramoksha Parva, Kripa informs Ashvatthama of his father’s demise. Enraged and grief-stricken, Ashvatthama vows vengeance and proclaims his intent to kill Yudhishthira. Declaring possession of the celestial Narayanastra, he unleashes it upon the Pandava army. The weapon causes widespread devastation and panic, but Krishna instructs the Pandava troops to discard their weapons to nullify its effect. While Bhima initially refuses, Arjuna intervenes with the Varuna weapon to shield him. As the Narayana weapon can only be used once, its threat is neutralized. Ashvatthama continues to fight fiercely, engaging Dhrishtadyumna, Satyaki, and Arjuna. At one point, he employs the Agneya weapon against Arjuna, but it is successfully countered by Arjuna’s Brahma weapon. Defeated and retreating from the battlefield, Ashvatthama encounters Vyasa, who reveals to him his divine nature as a partial incarnation of Shiva and acknowledges his unwavering devotion through the worship of Shiva.

==== Karna and Shalya Parva ====
During the Karna Parva, Ashvatthama remains a key warrior in the Kaurava ranks. He supports Karna and engages Bhima in a fierce duel, earning praise from celestial beings. He later confronts Krishna and Arjuna, displaying moments of valiant resistance, though at times he is compelled to retreat. He notably kills Pandya and launches attacks against various divisions of the Pandava forces. Ashvatthama continues to exhibit both bravery and volatility—repeatedly swearing vengeance, vowing to kill Dhrishtadyumna, and clashing with major figures including Arjuna, Krishna, Satyaki, and Yudhishthira. On several occasions, his charioteer is forced to rescue him from the battlefield after he sustains injuries.

Following Karna’s death, Ashvatthama attempts to counsel Duryodhana toward making peace, though his advice goes unheeded. In the Shalya Parva, he plays a role in defending Shalya, rescues Kritavarman, and fights Bhima and Arjuna once more. After Duryodhana’s disappearance from the battlefield, Ashvatthama searches for him, demonstrating loyalty to his fallen allies. When Sanjaya informs him that Duryodhana has taken refuge in a lake, Ashvatthama, along with Kripa and Kritavarman, flees the battlefield. Upon visiting the wounded Duryodhana in hiding, their conversation is overheard by hunters and relayed to the Pandavas, who begin tracking Duryodhana’s location. Sensing the impending danger, Ashvatthama again retreats with his companions. Later, after Bhima strikes down Duryodhana in a duel, Ashvatthama, Kripa, and Kritavarman rush to his side.

=== Night raid ===
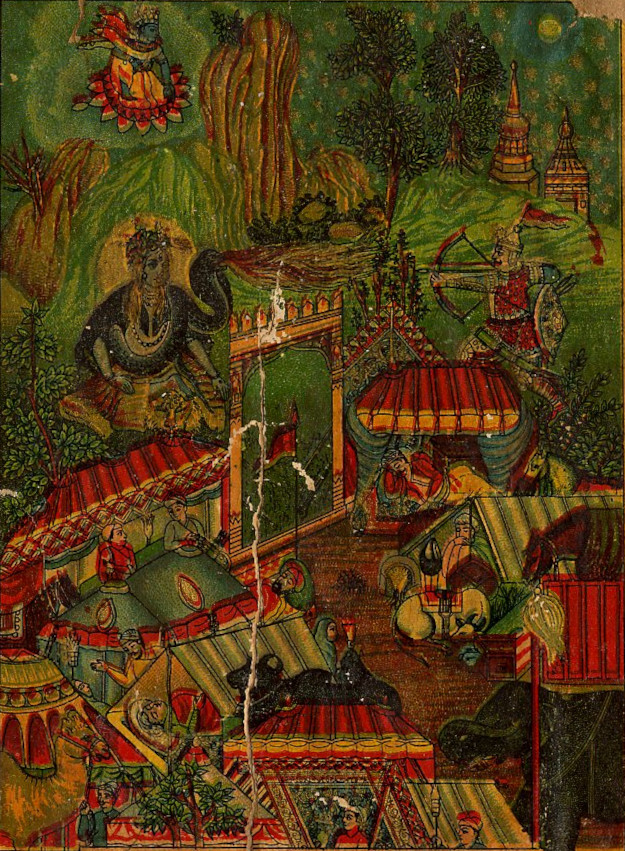
Ashvatthama propitiates Shiva (top) before making a night attack on the sleeping Pandava camp (bottom). Folio from Razmnama

After the devastating defeat of the Kaurava forces at Kurukshetra, the surviving warriors—Ashvatthama, Kripa, and Kritavarman—return to Duryodhana, who lies mortally wounded. Before dying, Duryodhana appoints Ashvatthama as the final commander-in-chief of the Kaurava army. Enraged by the killing of his father Drona by Dhrishtadyumna, Ashvatthama refuses to accept the war as concluded. His retaliation is recounted in the tenth book of the Mahabharata, the Sauptika Parva (The Book of the Attack upon the Sleeping Enemy).

The trio travels to a forest near the Pandava camp and takes shelter beneath a massive banyan tree. As night falls, Ashvatthama witnesses an owl slaughtering a group of crows in their sleep—an omen that inspires him to do the same to the sleeping Pandava army. Despite Kripa's earnest objections and moral concerns, Ashvatthama convinces the others to accompany him. Approaching the Pandava camp, Ashvatthama encounters a terrifying spectral figure at the gate and fails to defeat it through combat. He then prays to Shiva, offering parts of his own body in devotion. In response, a divine manifestation appears: Shiva grants him a celestial sword and enters his body. Empowered, Ashvatthama commands Kripa and Kritavarman to guard the gate while he infiltrates the camp. Once inside, Ashvatthama mercilessly kills Dhrishtadyumna with his bare hands, denying him a warrior's death. He proceeds to slay Shikhandi, Uttamaujas, Yudhamanyu, the five sons of Pandavas from Draupadi, and other sleeping warriors. The camp is set ablaze by Kripa and Kritavarman. Only Dhrishtadyumna’s charioteer escapes to inform the Pandavas.

=== Curse and aftermath ===
At dawn, the trio returns to Duryodhana, who praises Ashvatthama before succumbing to his injuries. The three then disperse and meet the grieving parents of Duryodhana—Dhritarashtra and Gandhari—and reports about the night raid. The trio flees in different directions to evade the inevitable wrath of the Pandavas; Ashvatthama seeks refuge at Vyasa’s hermitage. Meanwhile, Draupadi—Dhrishtadyumna's sister and Pandavas' queen—is brought to the scene of the massacre and, in grief, vows to undertake a fast unto death unless Ashvatthama is brought to justice. Bhima, accompanied by Nakula as charioteer, sets out in pursuit. Warned by Krishna of Ashvatthama’s use of the Brahmashirsha weapon, the Pandavas soon join the chase.

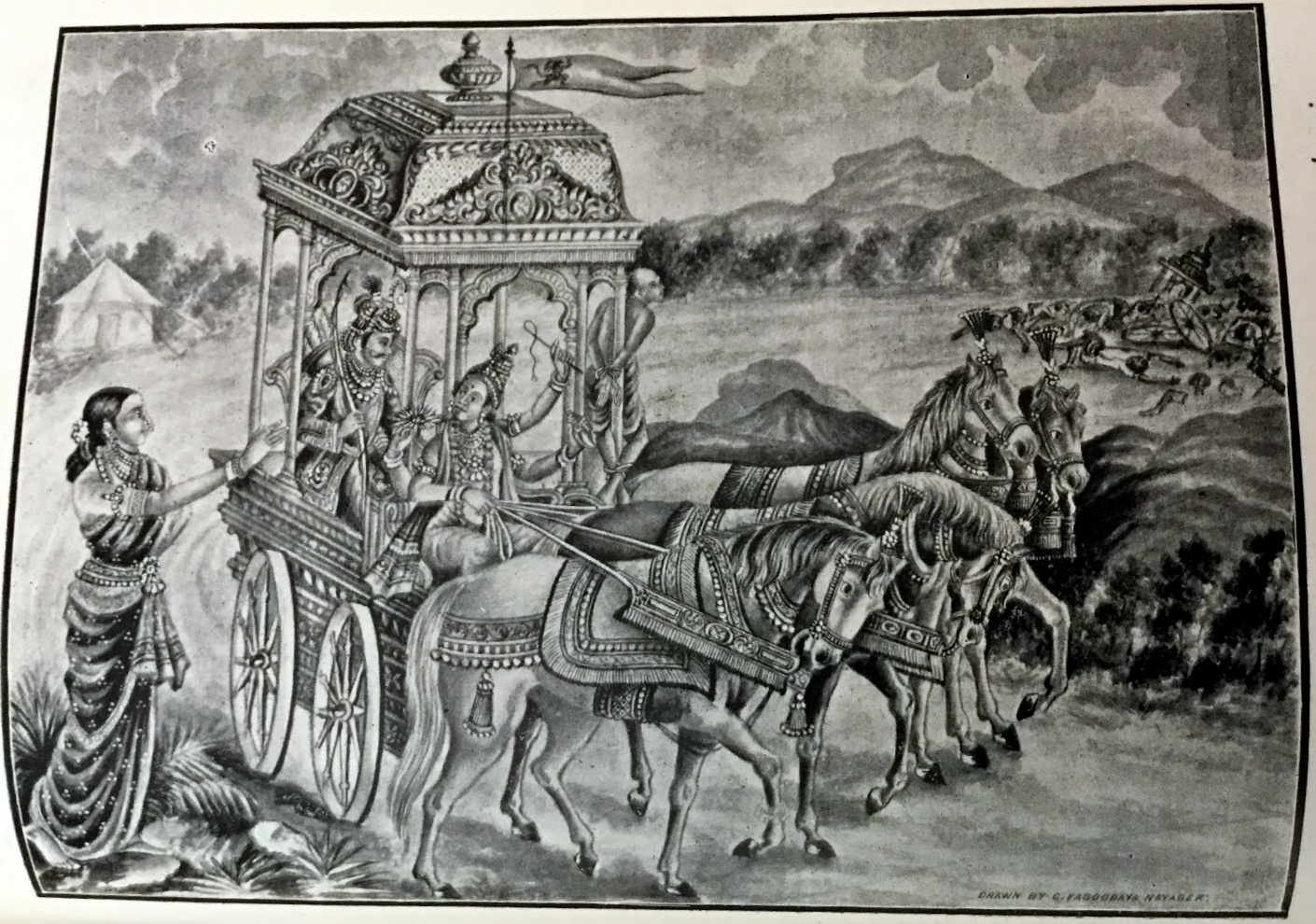
Ashvattama gets arrested and is brought to Draupadi by Arjuna.

They find Ashvatthama in Vyasa’s hermitage, disguised as an ascetic. In desperation, Ashvatthama charges a blade of grass with the incantation for the Brahmashirsha and hurls it with the intent to destroy the Pandavas. Arjuna counters with a similar weapon, but Vyasa and Narada intervene. Arjuna manages to retract his missile, but Ashvatthama cannot, lacking the ability. Vyasa proposes that Ashvatthama surrender in exchange for his life and demands the gem on his forehead. Ashvatthama complies, but in an attempt to end Pandavas' lineage, he redirects his weapon into the wombs of the Pandava women, including Arjuna's pregnant daughter-in-law Uttara, killing the unborn heir Parikshit. Krishna, however, promises to revive the fetus and proclaims that Parikshit will live a long life. For attempting to kill an unborn embryo, Ashvatthama is then cursed by Krishna to wander the earth for 3,000 years, enveloped in a miasma of suffering. The Pandavas return to Draupadi, while Ashvatthama vanishes into the forest with Vyasa.

== Assessment ==
Ashvatthama is characterized as a valourous and impetuous young warrior, embodying the radiance and ascetic dignity associated with Brahmanical ideals. His frequent disputes with Karna—though both support Duryodhana—effectively highlights the principal traits of his disposition. According to Theodor Goldstücker, Ashvatthama, though born a Brahmin, voices a sense of misfortune at having been compelled to adopt the vocation of a Kshatriya. The sole justification attributed to him by the compilers of the Mahabharata is his own assertion that, having willingly undertaken the duties of a warrior, he is resolved to pursue the path of a king and that of his high-minded father.

== Traditions ==
The Sapta Chiranjivi Stotram is a mantra that is featured in Hindu literature:

aśvatthāmā balirvyāsō hanumāṁśca vibhīṣaṇaḥ।
kṛpaḥ paraśurāmaśca saptaitai cirañjīvinaḥ॥
saptaitān saṁsmarēnnityaṁ mārkaṇḍēyamathāṣṭamam।
jīvēdvarṣaśataṁ sopi sarvavyādhivivarjitaḥ॥

— Sapta Chiranjivi Stotram

The mantra states that the remembrance of the seven immortals (Ashvatthama, Bali, Vyasa, Hanuman, Vibhishana, Kripa and Parashurama) offers one freedom from ailments and longevity.

A theory is proposed by historians R. Sathianathaier and D. C. Sircar, with endorsements by Hermann Kulke, Dietmar Rothermund and Burton Stein. Sircar points out that the family legends of the Pallavas speak of an ancestor descending from Ashvatthamaand his union with a Naga princess. It was the son born from this union, that would have started this dynasty. This claim finds support in the fact that Kanchipuram was where the Pallavas would dwell, and this was earlier a part of the Naga Kingdom.

A further corroboration is that the gotra of the Pālave Maratha family is Bharadwaja (grandfather of Ashvatthama), same as the one which Pallavas have attributed to themselves in their records.

There is a shrine for Ashvatthama in the famous Ananthapadmanabhaswamy temple of Thiruvananthapuram.
