= Vidura (disambiguation) =

Vidura is a character the ancient Indian epic Mahabharata.

Vidura may also refer to

- Vidura (name)
- Bhakta Vidur, a 1921 Indian film about Vidura
- Kaka Vidura, a Hindi poem by Jagadguru Rambhadracharya
- Dacalana vidura, a species of blue butterfly found in South East Asia

== See also ==
- Vidurashwatha, a city in Karnataka, India
  - Vidurashwatha massacre (1938), in the princely state of Mysore during British colonial rule
