= Huligina Maradi =

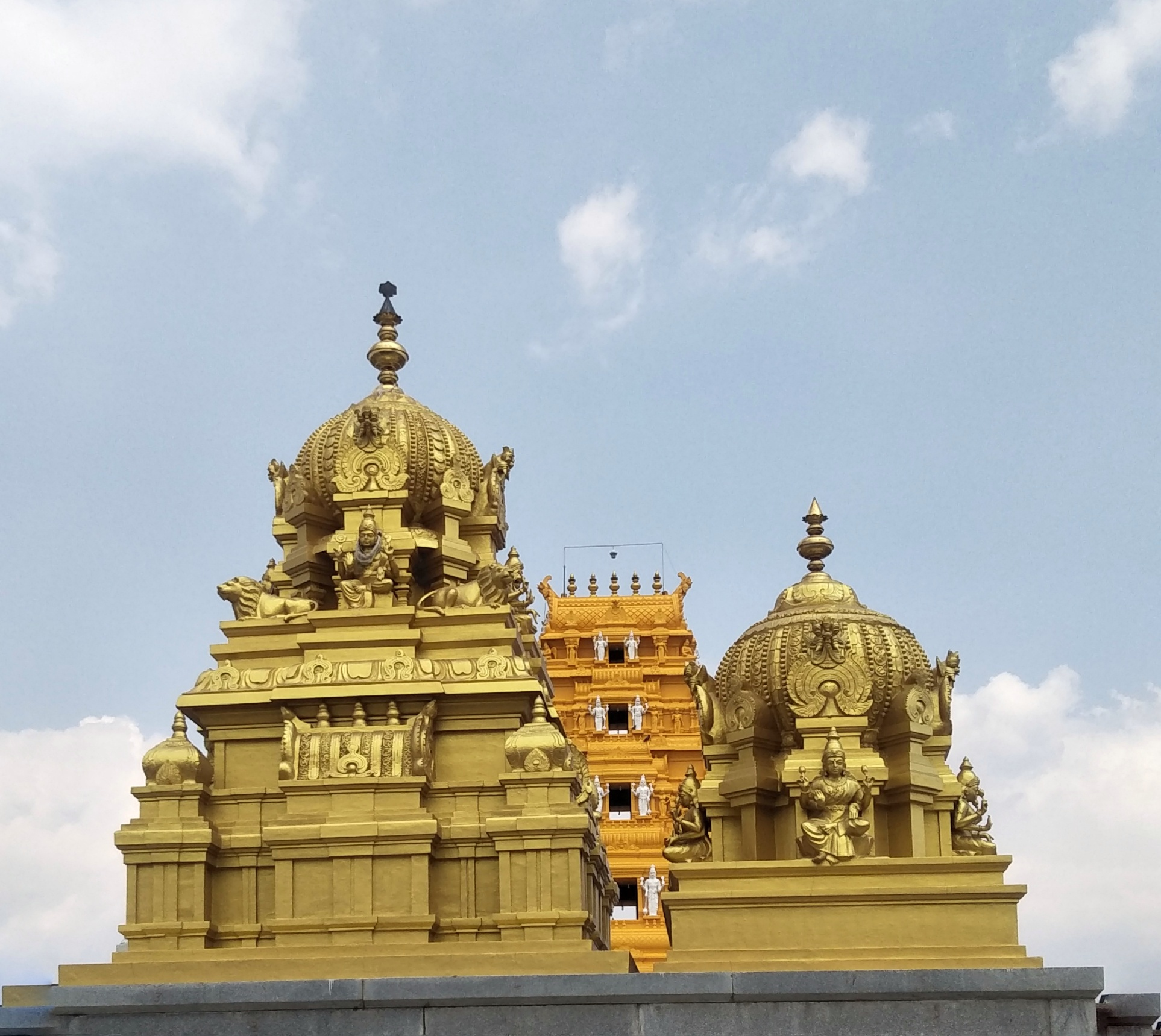

- Location in Karnataka, India Huligina Maradi (India)
- Coordinates: 11.822°N 76.818°E
- Country: India
- State: Karnataka
- District: Chamarajanagar

Languages
  - Official: Kannada
- Time zone: UTC+5:30 (IST)

Huligina Maradi is a hill located in the Gundlupete Taluk, Chamarajanagar district of the state of Karnataka. It has a temple dedicated to Lord Srinivasa. It is also known as Huligadri, Dakshina Seshadri and Vyagrachala.

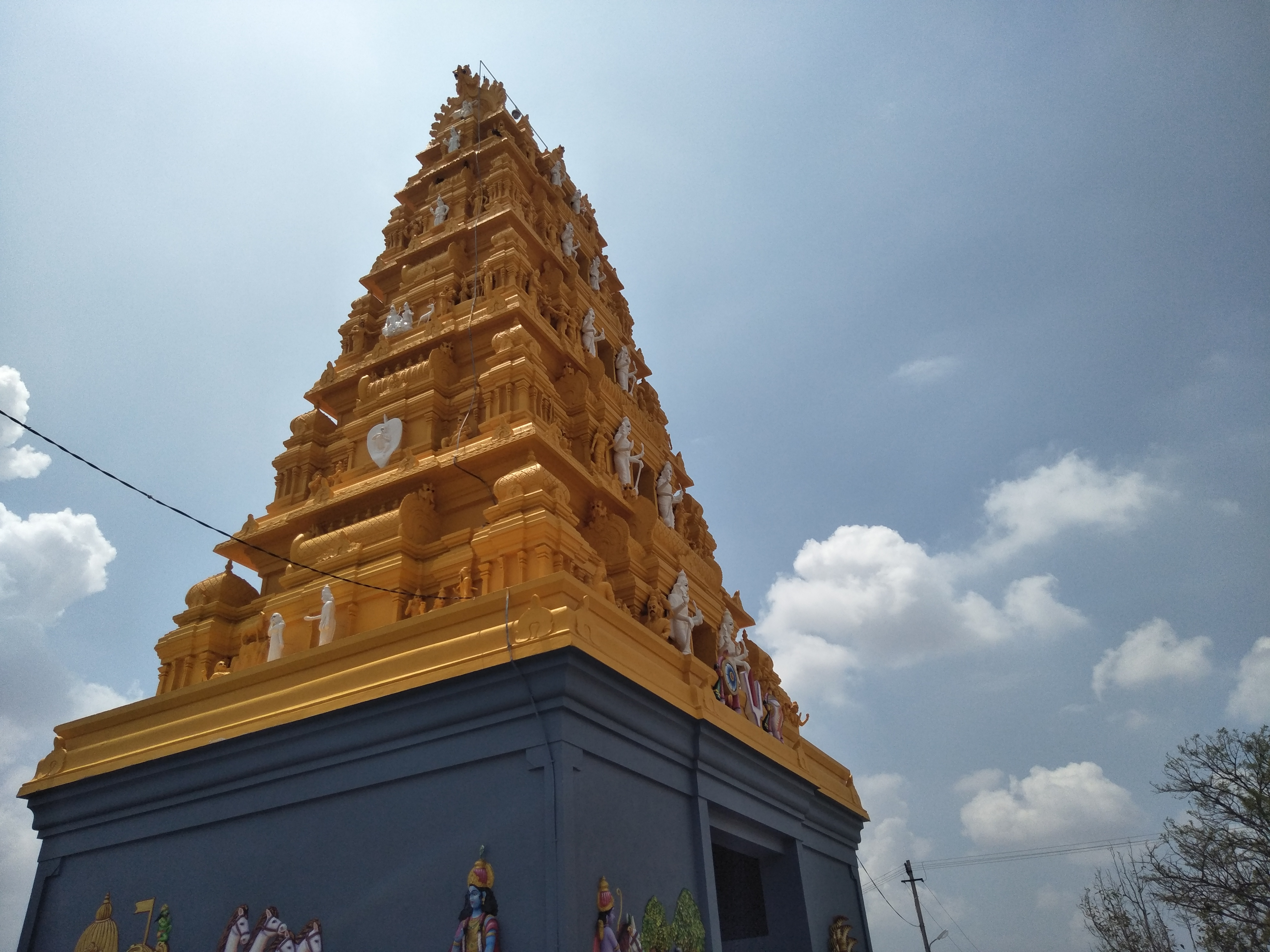
Rajagopara of the temple

This place is popularly known as "Dakshina Sheshadri", as narrated in ‘Srimad Varaha Purana’. Lord Sri Srinivasa, worshipped by Lord Sri Rama in Treta Yuga, Pandavas in Dvapara Yuga, Agasthya maharishi and Adishesha. Lord Venkataramana blessed the great saint ‘Mandavya Maharishi’ on his performance of long penance.
