= Udyoga Parva =

Fifth book of the Mahabharata

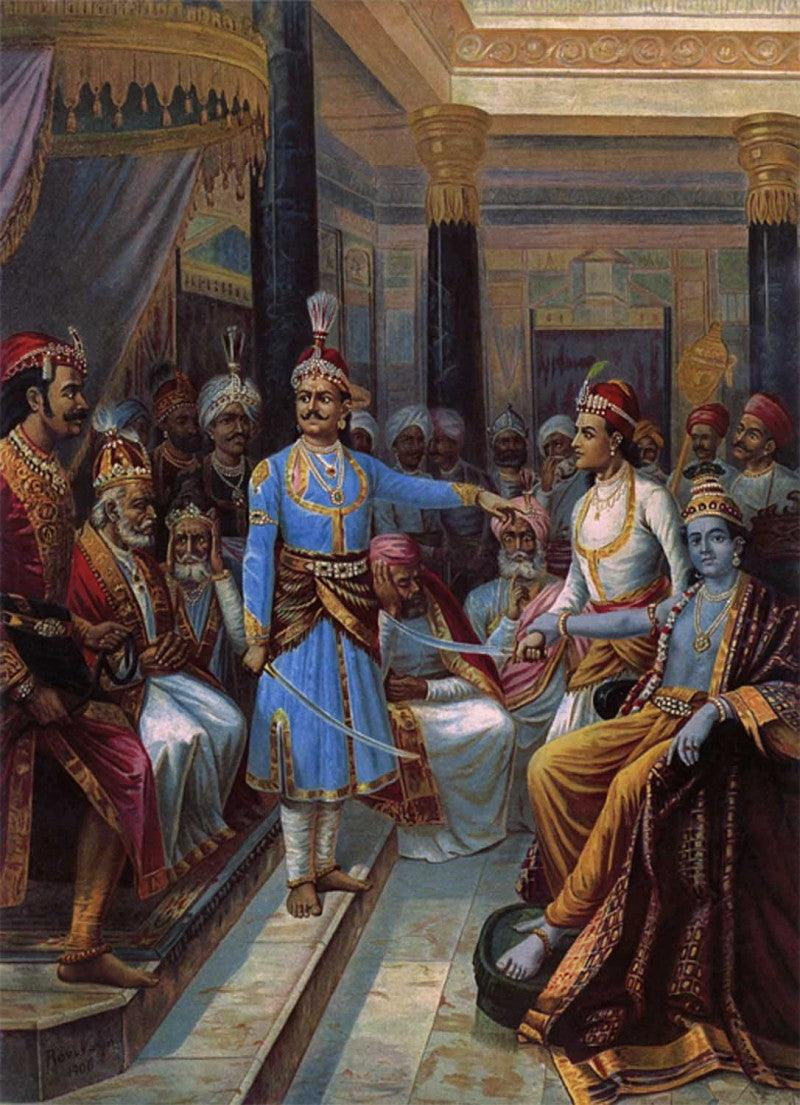
Duryodhana insults Krishna in the court of Hastinapura, a scene from the Udyoga Parva painted by Raja Ravi Varma

The Udyoga Parva (Sanskrit: उद्योग पर्वः) ("Book of Effort") is the fifth of the eighteen parvas (books) of the Indian epic Mahabharata. Udyoga Parva traditionally has 10 parts and 199 chapters. The critical edition of Sabha Parva has 12 parts and 197 chapters.

Udyoga Parva describes the period immediately after the exile of Pandavas had ended. The Pandavas return, demand their half of the kingdom. The Kauravas refuse. The book includes the effort for peace that fails, followed by the effort to prepare for the great war—the Kurukshetra War.

Vidura Niti, a theory of leadership as propounded by Vidura, is embedded in Udyoga Parva (Chapters 33–40). The Sanatsujatiya, a text commented upon by Adi Shankara, is contained within the Udyoga Parva (Chapters 41–46).

== Structure and chapters ==
The Udyoga Parva traditionally has 10 upa-parvas (parts, little books) and 199 adhyayas (chapters).

=== Sainyodyoga Parva (chapters: 1–19) ===
The 13th year of exile is over. Kings assemble in king Virata's court to mark the marriage of his daughter to Arjuna's son Abhimanyu. Krishna tells the gathered kings that the Pandavas must return to their kingdom and that the Kauravas must return the kingdom that they had taken from the Pandavas for 13 years after a game of dice. Krishna speculates that the Kauravas may refuse the return and use their military Yudhishthira personally visits and makes the demand, or he may be willing to make a peaceful transfer. The intentions of the other side are unknown, so Krishna suggests that they should send a capable ambassador to understand the intentions of the Kauravas and arrange a peaceful transfer.

Satyaki reminds the gathered kings that the Kauravas acquired the kingdom through trickery and evil actions, and that evil people do not change. Satyaki claims that the proposed peaceful diplomatic approach is ridiculous because peace can never be negotiated from a position of weakness. Only the strong—who have the power and means to destroy their opponent—get a fair and just deal during peace negotiations. Satyaki recommends that the Pandavas establish a visibly strong army and slay all of their opponents. Drupada suggests despatching envoys to other virtuous and good kingdoms to build a military alliance for the Pandavas. Krishna approves. Envoys spread out. The kings and Krishna return to their homes. In parallel, Duryodhana, on learning the Pandavas' intentions, started building their alliances for war to weaken the Pandavas to a point that they do not even ask for to get their kingdom back. Both the Pandavas and Kauravas meet Krishna in Dwaraka for their military preparations, but with morally opposite stances. Krishna asks Arjuna to choose either his army or he himself alone, resolved not to fight on the field. Arjuna chooses Krishna on his side. Duryodhana, in contrast, gets Krishna's army to serve him. Krishna decides and promises to drive Arjuna's chariot if war becomes necessary. Duryodhana then went to the son of Rohini of great strength, and approaching him, explained to him his reasons. Balarama refused to take part in battle, as his affection is for both sides. Both sides gather a massive alliance of armies, with the Pandavas having seven units of troops and Kauravas having eleven units, the Kauravas have a larger army. Upon being serviced and asked by Duryodhana as a boon, Shalya joins the Kauravas' side and subsequently meets Yudhishthira. After learning that Shalya was tricked, Yudhishthira asked Karna to choose him to be his charioteer during the war in the future, and compared his riding skills to Krishna. For their good, and the protection of Arjuna, he must despirit Karna by recounting the praises of Arjuna so that victory can be achieved. Shalya promised him that he will speak to him in war in such contradictory words that will bereft him of pride and valour, and will be easily slain by an antagonist. Yudhishthira convinces Shalya that the Kauravas are in error. Shalya agrees to explain Yudhishthira's position to Duryodhana. Shalya leaves the Pandavas' camp to meet the Kaurava brothers.

=== Sanjaya-yana Parva (chapters: 20–32) ===
Drupada's envoy reaches Kaurava brothers. He announces that Pandava brothers do not want war, they see war as something that ruins the world, all they want is an amicable settlement. He also informs the Dhritarashtra and Kuru family, that Yudhishthira seeks peace not out of weakness; they have seven Akshauhinis (large battalions). Drupada's envoy asks that Kaurava brothers give virtue and peace a chance, they give back that which should be returned. Bhishma responds that peace makes sense, but Karna on hearing Pandavas praises by that envoy in the court of Kaurava brothers, argues that Pandavas had become prideful of their might, so war is preferable. Dhritarashtra dismisses Drupada's envoy, promising to send Sanjaya to the Pandavas with a full response.

Dhritarashtra summons Sanjaya and asks him to meet the Pandava brothers, but does not propose anything concrete about the peaceful transfer of the kingdom. Sanjaya meets Yudhishthira and urges peace, saying that the war will cause losses to both sides and notes that if the Pandavas kill the Kauravas, it will make them miserable in victory. Yudhishthira says the Pandavas do not want war, they want peace and prosperity. The Pandavas had left their kingdom, Indraprastha, during the exile, and Dhritarashtra must return the kingdom to him to make peace. Yudhishthira suggests to Sanjaya, in Chapter 31 of the parva, that he would accept a smaller kingdom if that would prevent war, further peace. Yudhisthira claims that the Pandavas are ready for peace and for war. Sanjaya returns to Dhritarashtra and urges him to take the path of peace, and in a brutally directly manner, refers to Dhritarashtra's approach towards the Pandavas as sinful, suicidal and wrong.

=== Prajagara Parva (chapters: 33–40) ===
Dhritarashtra summons Vidura for counsel, confesses Sanjaya's message have disordered his senses and caused him sleeplessness. Dhritarashtra asks for moral guidance and wisdom to lead his kingdom. Sage Vidura presents a discourse that is referred to as Vidura Niti. It describes the character and habits of wise men, how they combine virtuous life with prosperity. These adhyayas also describe the duties and actions of kings that enable a prosperous kingdom. After listening to Vidura, Dhritarashtra leans for peace and an accommodation of Pandava brothers; however, he says Duryodhana wants the opposite. Dhritarashtra claims that although his exertion may be in vain, destiny will do what it wants to.

=== Sanatsujata Parva (chapters: 41–46) ===
Dhritarashtra continues in his suffering of anxiety and depression. He seeks more counsel from the sage Vidura. The sage says he was born into the Sudra class and has already counselled the king, perhaps the king should get a second opinion from Sanat-Sujata who was born into the Brahmin class. Vidura brings in the sage Sanat-Sujata. Dhritarashtra asks him questions about eternal being, life after death and immortality. The response of Sanat-Sujata is another treatise called Sanatsujatiya (sometimes spelled Sanatsugatiya or Sanatsugâtîya). Scholars suggest Sanatsujatiya may have been a later insertion and addition into the original Epic. Adi Shankara commented on Sanatsujatiya, parts of the commentary too have been corrupted later by unknown individuals.

Sanatsujatiya is a treatise on spirituality, inward contemplation, and marga (paths) to liberation and freedom. Sanat-Sujata insists that rituals and Vedic ceremonies are not the path to emancipation, ignorance is living death, it is the true knowledge of universal self that emancipates; he suggests that gods are ordinary creatures who have realized that self-knowledge. This view of human beings as creatures of unlimited potential, mirrors those found in the Upanishads. Craving for wealth, desire for fame, and longing for power suggest Sanatsugātiýa and is a cause for misery. Knowledge, virtue and faith in fruits of action are a cause of contentment. Dhritarashtra reminds Sanatsujata that the Vedas' declaration that sacrificial ceremonies remove sins and lead to emancipation raises the question of why men should not engage in these practices. Sanat-Sujata replies that there are different paths, all with one goal. There is great inconsistency in the interpretation of these paths. Ceremonies put undue importance to external forms and often ignore the inner self. Dhritarashtra asks if one can achieve emancipation in the afterlife by renouncing everything, but without virtue and righteous actions. Sanatsujata replies that it is the inner state that matters, not outward manifestations. The hymns of the Vedas do not rescue people from the sins they commit. Vice and knowledge can never dwell together. Sanatsujata then outlines twelve virtues one must live by and twelve vices to avoid, followed by three requirements for free, liberated life. In Chapter 44, Sanatsujata suggests that knowledge is the only path to emancipation. In Chapter 45, Sanatsujata suggests that virtuous attributes and actions are the path to gain that knowledge. After the counsel from Sanatsujata, Dhritarashtra retires for the night.

=== Yanasandhi Parva (chapters: 47–73) ===
The Kaurava brothers assemble in the court to hear Sanjaya, who has returned from the Pandava brothers (see Sanjaya-yana Parva above). Sanjaya gives them the message of the Pandavas, in which the Pandavas demands that the Kauravas either surrender to King Yuddhishthira and return his kingdom to him or they would start a war that would lead to Kuru's destruction. Bhishma recommends peace and the return of the kingdom. Drona supports Bhishma. Dhritarashtra inquires about Yudhisthria's military preparation. Sanjaya frankly criticizes Dhritarashtra for his vicious conduct towards the Pandavas. Duryodhana, getting provoked by the Pandavas' praises, reminds everyone of the warriors on their side, as well as his own courage and readiness for war. Dhritarashtra asks about kingdoms that have become allies with the Pandavas. Sanjaya provides the details. Duryodhana interjects and provides a list of kingdoms that have allied with the Kauravas and are ready for war. Dhritarashtra asks his son to accept peace and return the kingdom to the Pandavas. Duryodhana mocks and refuses. Bhishma criticizes Karna and says that he wouldn't participate in the war along with low-born suta. Karna promises to not enter the battlefield until Bhishma's fall and tells Duryodhana to be polite with Bhishma and Drona, as they were too old. But the fact is that Bhishma wasn't able to see that both of his grandsons were going to kill each other. Dhritarashtra again asks Duryodhana to choose peace. Duryodhana insists on war.

=== Bhagavat-yana Parva (chapters: 74–150) ===
The Pandava brothers gather their counsels, along with Krishna. Yudhishthira opens the meeting with a desire for peace. Krishna offers to be an envoy of peace to the Kauravas with the counsel that the Pandavas should prepare everything for war. Bhima, Arjuna, Nakula, Sahadeva and Satyaki take turns and express their views to Krishna, who comments on each. Krishna leaves for the court of the Kaurava brothers and meets Rishis on the way. Dhritarashtra, learning of Krishna's arrival, makes great preparations to honour his welcome. Bhishma and Vidura applaud his act. Duryodhana himself makes preparations to please Krishna. Krishna, arriving at Hastinapura, first meets with Pritha, then Vidura, and—on the next day—meets with Duryodhana in his chamber, then sets out for Kuru's assembly hall, disregarding all arrangements. Praising the Pandavas' kind acts and prowess and criticizing the Kurus' cowardice and inferiority, he proposes peace between both parties. Dhritarashtra agrees with his proposal, but Duryodhana, casting his eyes on Radha's son, laughingly ignores it. The great Rishis, including Narada, Kanwa, and Rama, tell him various stories for the change of his opinion, but he, from folly, disregards their words and criticizes Krishna for his harsh words. All of them rebuke Duryodhana for his foolishness and advise to bind and give Duryodhana and his followers to the sons of Kunti. In anger, Duryodhana walks out of court. Gandhari was called into the court. Vindictive, Duryodhana was once more caused to re-enter the court. Gandhari called him a wicked son of an impure soul for his act. Duryodhana once more went out in anger. He made a council with his followers to seize Krishna. Satyaki learns about it and informs Krishna. Krishna laughs at Duryodhana's plan and uses his power of divine illusion to show all of them his prowess and sets out of the court. The parva describes the symbolic story of Garuda to emphasize that peace is better. Kanwa concurs with Krishna on peace. The sage Narada appears and tells the story of Gavala, Yayati and Madhavi to explain to Duryodhana that his obstinate craving for war is wrong. Dhritarashtra rebukes Duryodhana for his act.

Krishna leaves the city of the Kauravas with Karna in a chariot. He tells Karna who Karna's real mother is, how he is a brother of the Pandavas, and asks him to join his brothers because they will cheerfully accept him and will choose him to be the next king. Karna already knows this, but refuses, saying that he cannot betray Duryodhana, since he was first to hold his hand in friendship and give him a kingdom, nor from affection can he leave Radha and Adiratha, who cared for him from childhood, while Kunti abandoned him without thinking about his future; it would be inglorious for him and his mother, and Yudhisthira was the righteous soul to let him be the king. He also asks Krishna to not reveal his birth secret to his younger brothers, as Yudhisthira may deny the Hastinapura kingdom for Karna and conceal this for the present. Karna repents for his acts in the past for pleasing Duryodhana. He said he knows he will die in the great war being on the unrighteous side, but he cannot leave his friend in distress, so he will challenge Arjuna and will earn great merit or glory. Karna then hugs Krishna and returns to the city. Vidura meets with Partha. Kunti, Karna's real mother meets him during his prayers near Bhagiratha river, and they talk. She explains what happened when Karna was born and urges him to reconsider his position about the war. Surya confirms Kunti's words. Although addressed by his mother and his father Surya himself, Karna's heart did not yet waver, for he was firmly devoted to truth, and he replies that she abandoned him as soon as he was born, involving risks to life itself, deprived him of Kshatriya rites, and addressed him today, desirous to do good to herself. He cannot change sides now and has frustrated the cherished hopes of Suyodhana, since it is too late for him. This is his chance to fight Arjuna and earn fame and the respect of the world. He promises that, except Arjuna, her other sons shall not be slain by him, even though he has the chance and the number of her sons will never be less than five, with five, either him or Arjuna, just like she pretended to have five sons before war. Kunti trembles with sorrow. Krishna reaches the Pandavas' camp and updates them on his unsuccessful efforts for peace as an envoy.

=== Sainya-niryana Parva (chapters: 151–159) ===
War preparations accelerate. Yudhishthira seeks nominations for the commander in chief of the allied forces behind the Pandava brothers. Many names come forward, and Krishna selects Dhristadyumna. The Pandava army marches for war to Kurukshetra. Duryodhana, Karna, Shakuni and Dussasana prepare for war. Bhishma is appointed by Duryodhana as commander in chief of the armies behind the Kaurava brothers. Bhishma said that the Pandavas are dear to him, so he will not fight them openly, and will therefore slay at least 10,000 warriors every day. Both sides select chiefs for each of their Akshauhinis (battalions)—the Pandavas have seven battalions, the Kauravas have 11. Halayudha came there to meet the Pandavas and his brother Krishna and expresses his views that he cannot pick a side to fight, as both Bhima and Duryodhana are his disciples, and leaves to go on a journey to the sacred waters. Rukmi (once a fierce rival of Janarddana) enters the Pandavas' camp and boasts about his ability to slay all of the enemy commanders. Arjuna smilingly boasts that he does not have any ally in any of his fights and he single-handedly defeats everyone, so he has no need of his assistance. Rukmi then goes to talk to Duryodhana, who—proud of his bravery—rejects him in the same way, so he also withdrew from the battle. Dhritarashtra meets Sanjaya, expresses his anxiety, and wonders if the war is one of choice or destiny.

=== Ulukabhigamana Parva (chapters: 160–164) ===
Duryodhana sends Uluka to the Pandavas' camp in Kurukshetra for war, delivering insulting messages to Yudhishthira, Bhima, Nakula, Sahadeva, Virata, Drupada, Dhananjaya, Sikhandin, Dhristadyumna and Vasudeva as part of psychological warfare. The parva recites the fable of the cat and the mouse. Bhima gets angry at Uluka for his speech and addresses him harshly, but he is pacified by Arjuna. Uluka gives all the messages he was provided. Each person who listens to the message replies. Yuddhishthira tells Uluka to return with the message he was given by all. Uluka returns to the Kauravas' camp and delivers the messages from the Pandava camp to him. Duryodhana and Karna arrays their troops to face the army of Pandavas. Yudhishthira moves his army. Dhristadyumna, the commander in chief of the allied Pandava forces, studies the strengths of the enemy and appoints particular warriors on the Pandavas' side to focus on particular warriors on the Kauravas' side.

=== Rathatiratha-sankhyana Parva (chapters: 165–172) ===
Infighting erupts within the Kauravas' side. Duryodhana asks for Bhishma's views on both sides' warriors counted as rathas, and atirathas. Bhishma lists all 100 Kaurava brothers and Sakuni as Rathas. Jayadratha is equal to two rathas. Kritavarman, Salya, as Atirathas. Aswathaman, Drona, as Maharathas, with Ashwatthama as the supreme bowman, whose arrows proceed in a continuous line touching each other, and mocks Karna as only being an ardharatha. Drona supports his words. Karna gets angry with Bhishma and criticizes him for making dissensions among Kurus by indicating warrior ranks, according only to his own caprice. He vows to not fight until he is laid down. The parva then describes rathas and atirathas on the Pandavas' side, ready for war. King Shikhandin is designated as a Ratha. Bhimasena is equal to eight Rathas. Nakula and Sahadeva are equal to four Rathas. Dhrupada, Virata, Satyajit and Yudhishthira are designated as Atirathas. Arjuna, Satyaki and Dhristadhyumna are designated as Maharathas. Bhishma said, he himself and their preceptor Drona are the only warriors who can advance against Dhananjaya, there is no third car-warrior.

=== Ambopakkyana Parva (chapters: 173–199) ===
This parva recites the story of Bhishma's past exploits and about a maiden named Amba, and how his emotional attachment means he can fight everyone but Sikhandin—a battalion commander on the Pandavas' side. Duryodhana then asks his commanders the time it will take each of them to annihilate the allied armies behind the Pandavas. Bhishma said that he can finish the slaughter in a month. Drona smilingly said that he is old and that his energy and activity have both become weak, but like Bhishma, he estimates that the campaign would take a month, while Kripa estimates two months. Aswatthaman claims that he can annihilate the Pandava army in ten nights. Karna, however, with great overconfidence, said that he can achieve that feat in five days. Bhishma ridicules and mocks Karna. Yudhishthira, learning the news from spies, also asks the same question to Arjuna about the time he will take to annihilate the armies behind the Kauravas. With Vasudeva as his ally, Arjuna said that if he provides and discharges the terrible and mighty weapon he obtained from Mahadeva with enough energy, he can, on his divine car, annihilate all mortals on earth in the twinkling of the eye. No one knows this on the opposite side, but he is restricted to not using it for his own selfish reasons on human beings. The Pandava and Kaurava armies march to the battlefront and face each other for war.

== English translations ==
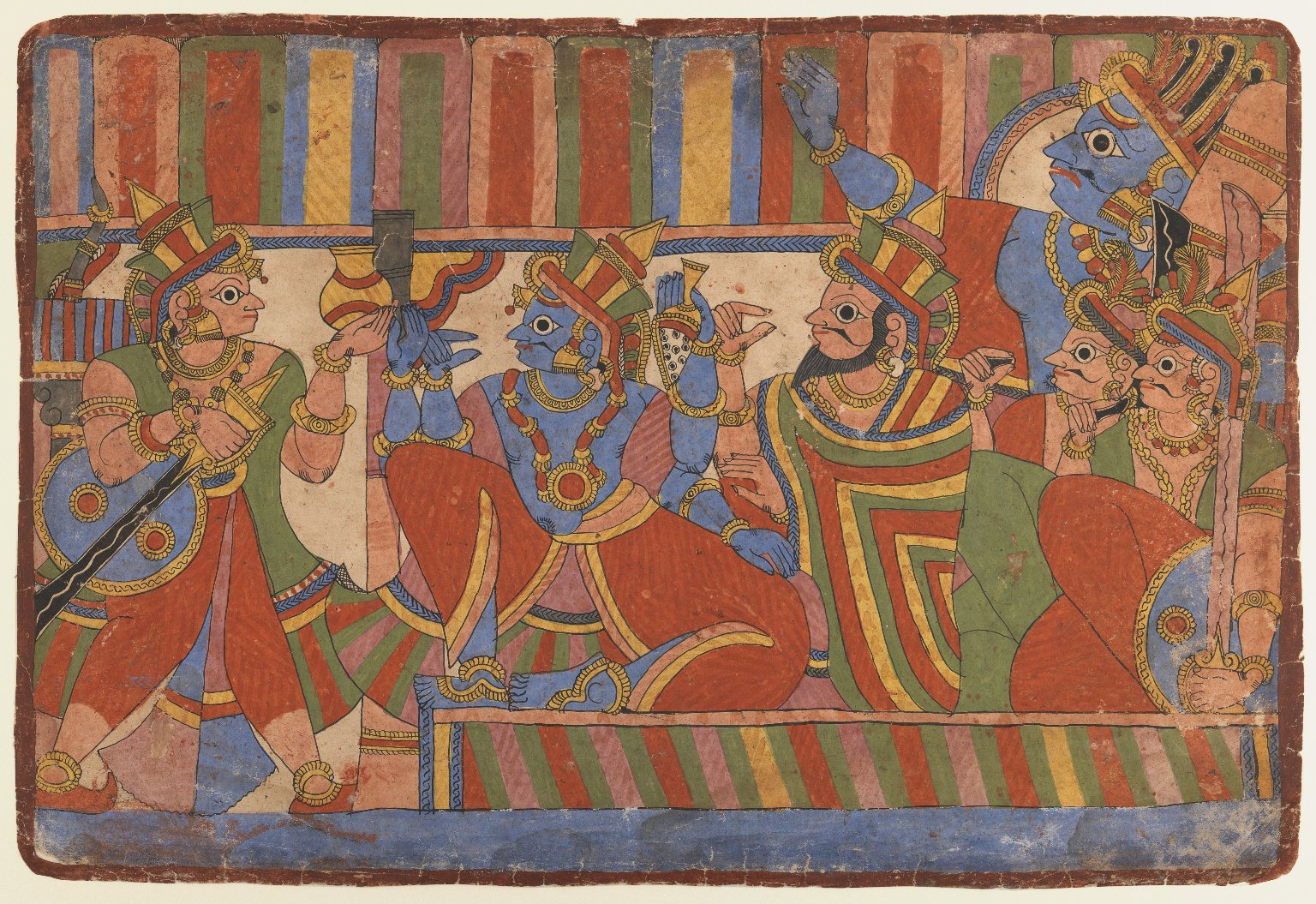
Brooklyn Museum—Krishna counsels the Pandavas

Udyoga Parva was composed in Sanskrit. Several translations of the book in English are available. Two translations from 19th century, now in public domain, are those by Kisari Mohan Ganguli and Manmatha Nath Dutt. The translations vary with each translator's interpretations.

Clay Sanskrit Library has published a 15 volume set of the Mahabharata which includes a translation of Udyoga Parva by Kathleen Garbutt. This translation is modern and uses an old manuscript of the Epic. The translation does not remove verses and chapters now widely believed to be spurious and smuggled into the Epic in 1st or 2nd millennium AD.

According to the Parvasangraha chapter of Adi Parva of one version of the Mahabharata, Vyasa had composed 186 sections in Udyoga Parva, with 6,698 slokas.

J. A. B. van Buitenen completed an annotated edition of Udyoga Parva, based on critically edited and least corrupted version of Mahabharata known in 1975. Debroy, in 2011, notes that updated critical edition of Udyoga Parva, with spurious and corrupted text removed, has 10 parts, 197 adhyayas (chapters) and 6,001 shlokas (verses). Debroy's translation of a critical edition of Udyoga Parva has been published in Volume 4 of his series.

The entire parva has been "transcreated" and translated in verse by the poet Dr. Purushottama Lal published by Writers Workshop.

== Salient features ==
Udyoga Parva has several embedded treatises, such as a theory of leadership (Vidura Niti), a theory of dūta (diplomats, envoys) and a theory of just war.

=== Vidura Niti ===
In Chapters 33 through 40 of Udyoga Parva, also called Prajagara sub-parva, sage Vidura outlines things wise people and leaders should do, and things they should not. These are known as Vidura Niti. Some examples of his recommendations for leaders:

1. He should wish for the prosperity of all, and should never set heart on inflicting misery on any group.
2. He should pay attention to those who have fallen in distress and adversity. He should not ignore persistent sufferings of those that depend on him, even if the suffering is small.
3. He should show compassion to all creatures, do what is good for all creatures rather than a select few.
4. He should never impede the development and growth of agriculture and economic activity by anyone.
5. He should be always be prepared to protect those that depend on him for their safety and security.
6. He should be fair and accessible to his people. By means of virtue should he attain success, by means of virtue should he sustain it.
7. He should consider the welfare of his people as his personal responsibility.
8. He should encourage learning and transmission of knowledge.
9. He should encourage profit and virtue. Prosperity depends on good deeds. Good deeds depend on prosperity.
10. He should avoid friendship with the sinful.
11. He should never misuse wealth, use harsh speech nor inflict extreme or cruel punishments.
12. He should only appoint those as ministers (senior positions in his staff) whom he has examined well for their history of virtue, dispositions, activity and whether they give others their due.

Vidura Niti also includes a few hundred verses with suggestions for personal development and the characteristics of a wise person. For example, in Chapter 33, Vidura suggests a wise person refrains from anger, exultation, pride, shame, stupefaction and vanity. He has reverence and faith, he is unhampered in his endeavors by either adversity or prosperity. He believes virtue and profit can go together, exerts and acts to the best of his ability, disregards nothing. He understands quickly, listens carefully, acts with purpose. He does not grieve for what is lost, and does not lose his sense during crisis. He is constantly learning, he seeks enlightenment from everything he experiences. He acts after deciding, and decides after thinking. He neither behaves with arrogance, nor with excessive humility. He never speaks ill of others, nor praises himself. He does not exult in honours to himself, nor grieves at insults; he is not agitated by what others do to him just like a calm lake near river Ganges.

=== Theory of envoys ===
J. A. B. van Buitenen, and others, have referred to parts of Udyoga Parva, along with Book 12 of Mahabharata and non-Epic works such as Arthashastra, as a treatise on diplomats and envoys (called dūta, Sanskrit: दूत) involved in negotiations between parties. Broadly, the Parva recognizes four types of envoys—Samdisțārtha are envoys who convey a message but do not have any discretion to negotiate; Parimițārtha are envoys who are granted a circumscribed purpose with some flexibility on wording; Nisrșțārtha are envoys with an overall goal and significant discretion to adapt the details of negotiations to the circumstances; finally, Dūtapranidhi, a full ambassador who has full confidence of the party he represents, understands the interests and Dharma (law, morals, duties) of both parties, and can decide the goal as well as style of negotiations (Krishna acts as such an ambassador in Bhagavat-yana sub-parva of Udyoga Parva).

Udyoga Parva outlines the four methods of negotiations recommended for envoys who are dūtapranidhi: conciliation for the cause of peace and Dharma (sāman), praise your side while dividing the opposition by describing consequences of success and consequences of failure to reach a deal (bheda), bargain with gifts and concessions (dāna), bargain with threats of punishment (daņda). Beyond describing the types of diplomats, Udyoga Parva also lists how the envoy and messengers for negotiations should be selected, the safety and rights of envoys that must be respected by the receiving party regardless of how unpleasant or pleasant the message is. Envoys must be honest, truthful and direct without fear, that they serve not only the cause of king who sends them, but the cause of dharma (law), peace and truth.

== Quotations and teachings ==
Sainyodyoga Parva, Chapter 3:

As the inner nature of a man is, so he speaks.

— Satyaki, Udyoga Parva, Mahabharata Book v.3.1

Sanjayayana Parva, Chapter 25:

War causes destruction to all, it is sinful, it creates hell, it gives the same result in victory and defeat alike.

— Sanjaya, Udyoga Parva, Mahabharata Book v.25.7

Sanjayayana Parva, Chapter 27:

Wrath is a bitter remedy for evils, it causes malady in the head, destroys fame, and is a source of sinful acts. It ought to be controlled by a good man and those that do not control it are bad men.

— Sanjaya, Udyoga Parva, Mahabharata Book v.27.23

Sanjayayana Parva, Chapter 29:

One school says that it is by work that we obtain salvation, another school says that it is through knowledge.
Yet a man, even knowing all the properties of good, will not be satisfied without eating.
Knowledge bears fruit with action. Look at this world: one oppressed by thirst is satisfied by drinking water.
The opinion that any thing other than work is good, is nothing but the uttering of a fool and of a weak man.
In this world, the gods are resplendent through work. Wind blows through work. Sun works to cause day and night. Moon works. Rivers carry water through work. Indra works to shower rains.
Shakra became chief, by means of work, observing truth, virtue, self control, forbearance, impartiality and amiability.

— Vasudeva, Udyoga Parva, Mahabharata Book v.29.6–14

Prajagara Parva, Chapter 33:

Wise men rejoice in virtuous deeds, and do those that tend to their prosperity, and look not with contempt on what is good.
That man is said to be wise who is cognizant of the nature of all creatures, of causes and effects of all acts, and the means of human beings.
A wise man regulates his studies by wisdom, his wisdom follows his studies, he is ever ready to respect those that are good.
A wise man is he who, having acquired immense wealth, learning or power, conducts himself without any haughtiness.

— Vidura, Udyoga Parva, Mahabharata Book v.33.20–45

Prajagara Parva, Chapter 33:

Alone one should not taste a delicious dish, alone one should not think of profitable undertakings, alone one should not go on a journey, and alone one should not be awake amidst those that are asleep.

Forgiveness is a great power. For the weak, as well as for the strong, forgiveness is an ornament.
Forgiveness subdues every thing in the world. What is there that cannot be accomplished by forgiveness?
What can a wicked man do to one who has the sword of pacification in his hand?
Fire, falling on ground devoid of vegetation, is extinguished of itself.

Virtue is the highest good, forgiveness the supreme peace, knowledge the deepest satisfaction, and benevolence the one cause of happiness.

— Vidura, Udyoga Parva, Mahabharata Book v.33.51–56

Prajagara Parva, Chapter 34:

The reasons of an act, and its result should be carefully considered before it is done.
A wise man does or does not do an act after reflecting on the reasons of an act and its results if done.
A fish out of greediness does not think about the result of an action and swallows up the iron hook concealed in a dainty morsel.
He, who plucks unripe fruits from trees, does not get the juice out of it; and moreover he destroys the seeds.
Having carefully considered what will befall me after doing an act or not doing it, a man should do things or not do them.

— Vidura, Udyoga Parva, Mahabharata Book v.34.8–15

Prajagara Parva, Chapter 34:

The body of a man is like the chariot; his soul, the driver; and his senses, the horses.
Drawn by those excellent steeds when well trained, he that is wise and patient, performs life's journey in peace.

— Vidura, Udyoga Parva, Mahabharata Book v.34.59

Prajagara Parva, Chapter 34:

Arrows and darts can be extracted from the body,
but the darts of words cannot be extracted from the depth of the heart.
Arrows of words are shot from the mouth,
wounded by which one grieves night and day;
For they touch the innermost recesses of the hearts of others,
therefore a wise man should not fling them on others.

— Vidura, Udyoga Parva, Mahabharata Book v.34.79–80

Sanat-Sujata Parva, Chapter 42:

Ignorance is death. Truthfulness, kindness, modesty, self-control and knowledge are antidotes of ignorance.

— Sanatsujata, Udyoga Parva, Mahabharata Book v.42.4, v.42.45

Truth is the solemn vow of the good.

— Sanatsujata, Udyoga Parva, Mahabharata

Sanat-Sujata Parva, Chapter 43:

As a twig obtained from a big tree is used in pointing out the new moon, so are the Vedas used in pointing out the truth and other attributes of the Supreme Soul.
That man is not a devotee who observes the vow of silence, nor he who lives in the woods; but that one is said to be a true devotee who knows his own nature.

— Sanatsujata, Udyoga Parva, Mahabharata Book v.43.55–60

Sanat-Sujata Parva, Chapter 44:

Dhritarashtra said: Of what form is the Supreme Soul?
Sanat-Sujata said: It is the foundation of everything; it is nectar; it is the universe; it is vast, and delightful.

— Sanatsujata, Udyoga Parva, Mahabharata Book v.44.25–30

== See also ==
- Previous book of Mahabharata: Virata Parva
- Next book of Mahabharata: Bhishma Parva
