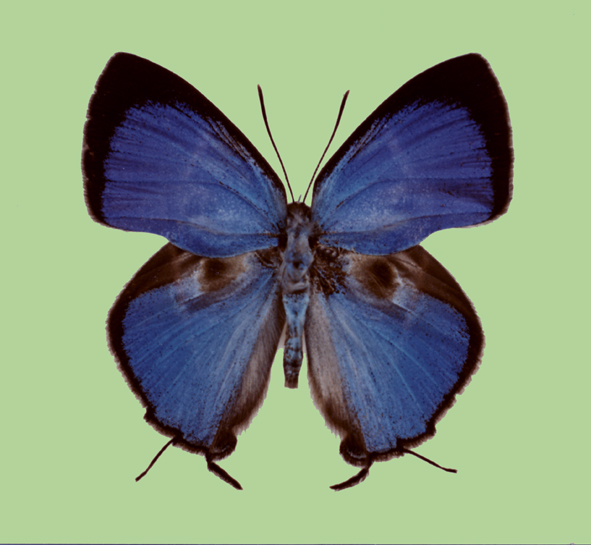
- Male upperside
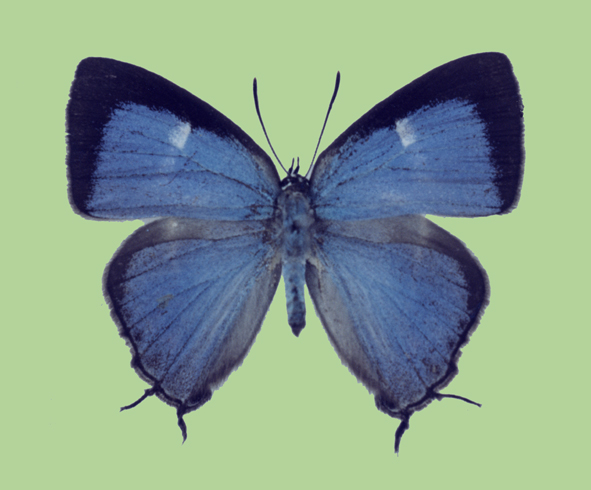
- Female upperside

Scientific classification
- Kingdom: Animalia
- Phylum: Arthropoda
- Class: Insecta
- Order: Lepidoptera
- Family: Lycaenidae
- Genus: Dacalana
- Species: D. akayamai

Binomial name
- Dacalana akayamai H. Hayashi, Schrőder & Treadaway, 1983

= Dacalana akayamai =

Species of butterfly

Dacalana akayamai is a butterfly of the family Lycaenidae first described by Hisakazu Hayashi, Heinz G. Schroeder and Colin G. Treadaway in 1983. It is endemic to the Philippine island of Mindanao.

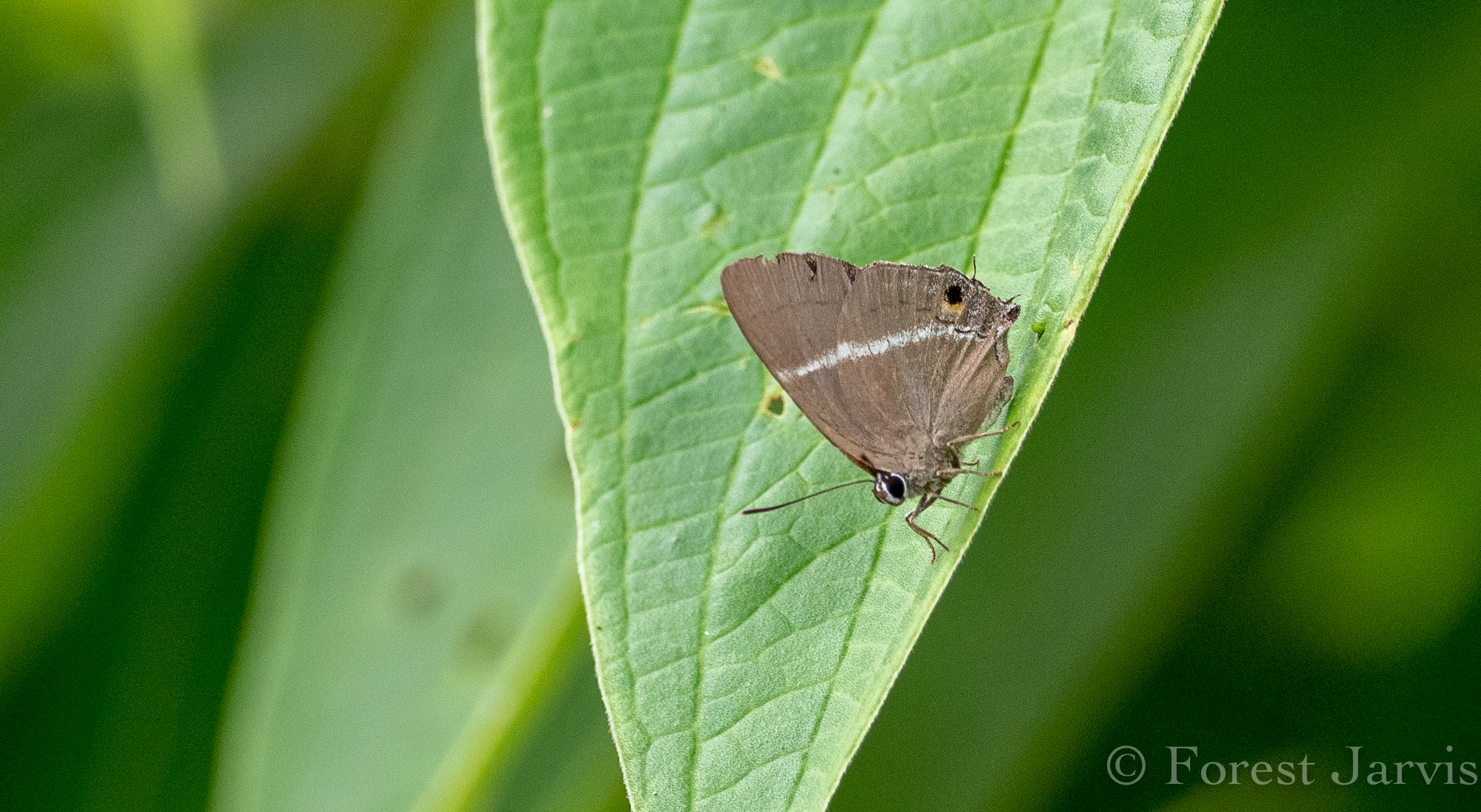
Underside

The specific name is dedicated to Mr. Atsuo AKAYAMA, the Japanese butterfly collector when he was young.
