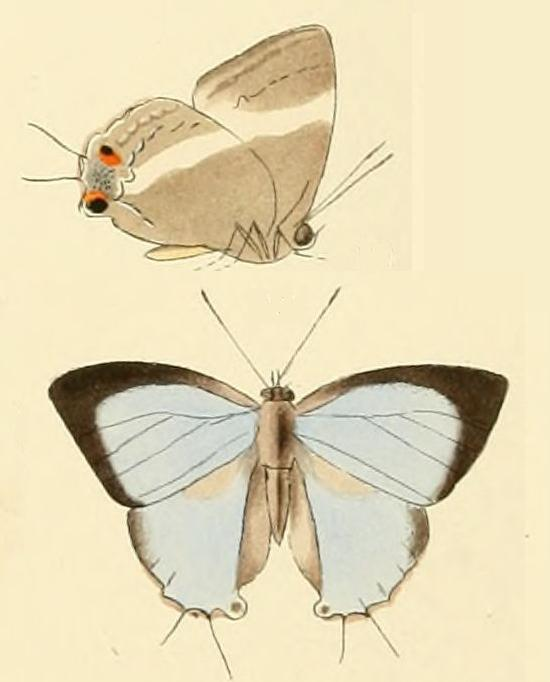

Scientific classification
- Kingdom: Animalia
- Phylum: Arthropoda
- Class: Insecta
- Order: Lepidoptera
- Family: Lycaenidae
- Genus: Dacalana
- Species: D. cotys

Binomial name
- Dacalana cotys (Hewitson, 1865)

= Dacalana cotys =

White-banded royal

Species of butterfly

Dacalana cotys, the white-banded royal is a species of blue butterfly (Lycaenidae) found in South East Asia.

== Range ==
The butterfly occurs in India from Sikkim to Arunachal Pradesh. eastwards and across to northern Nepal, Bhutan, Myanmar. and Thailand.

== Taxonomy ==
The butterfly was previously classified as Pratapa cotys, Ancema cotys and Camana cotys.

== Status ==
Not common as per Wynter-Blyth. Not rare as per Evans.

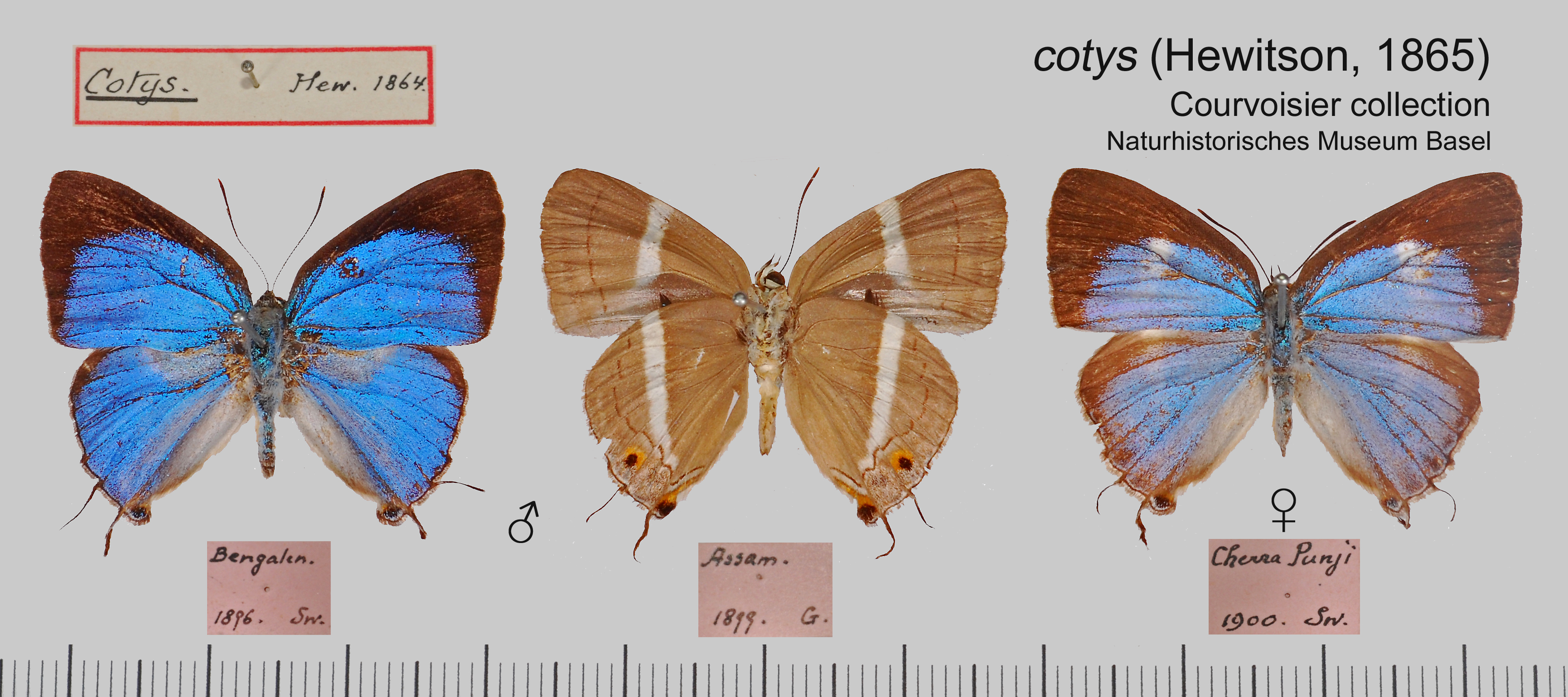
Dacalana cotys Courvoisier Collection, Basel

== Description ==
The butterfly has a wingspan of 33 to 37 mm.

The upperside of the male is a bright azure blue with a black border at the apex ranging from 0.5 to 5 mm at the apex. On the hindwing is a mid-costal white patch. The male has a brand on the upperside of the forewing. The female is paler with a prominent white patch at the end cell of the forewing.

On the underside, the butterfly has a white band on a pale-brown background which broadens towards the costa and dorsum. There is a lot of seasonal variation in the band width.

== Habit and habitat ==
It is mostly seen in wooded slopes of Himalaya. They are confined to forested area, often in the upper canopy. Males are often seen mud-puddling.

== See also ==
- Lycaenidae
- List of butterflies of India (Lycaenidae)
