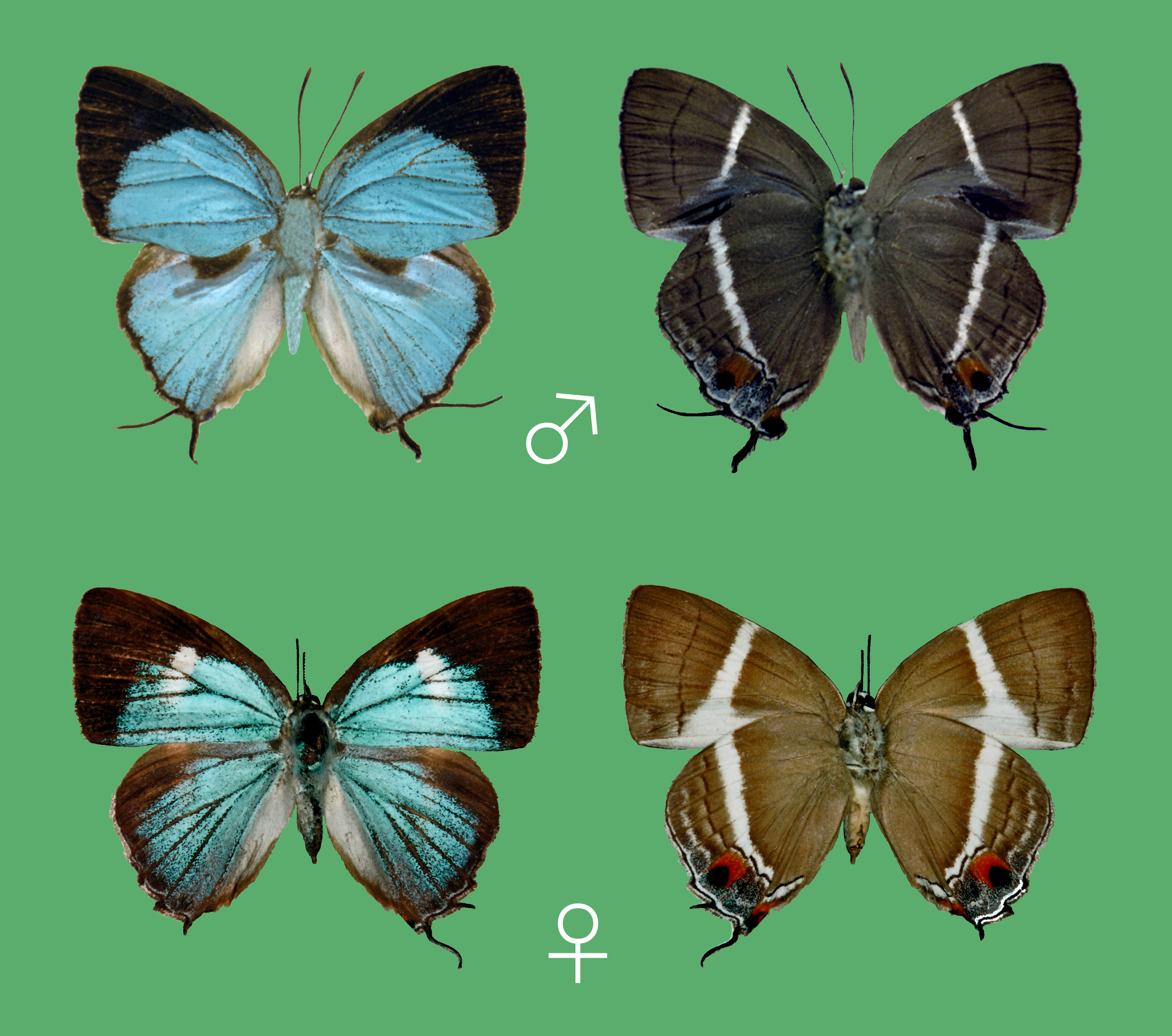
- Male and female

Scientific classification
- Kingdom: Animalia
- Phylum: Arthropoda
- Class: Insecta
- Order: Lepidoptera
- Family: Lycaenidae
- Genus: Dacalana
- Species: D. lucillae

Binomial name
- Dacalana lucillae H. Hayashi, Schrőder & Treadaway, 1983

= Dacalana lucillae =

Species of butterfly

Dacalana lucillae is a butterfly of the family Lycaenidae first described by Hisakazu Hayashi, Heinz G. Schroeder and Colin G. Treadaway in 1983. It is found only on Luzon island in the Philippines. The forewing length is 18–19 mm.
