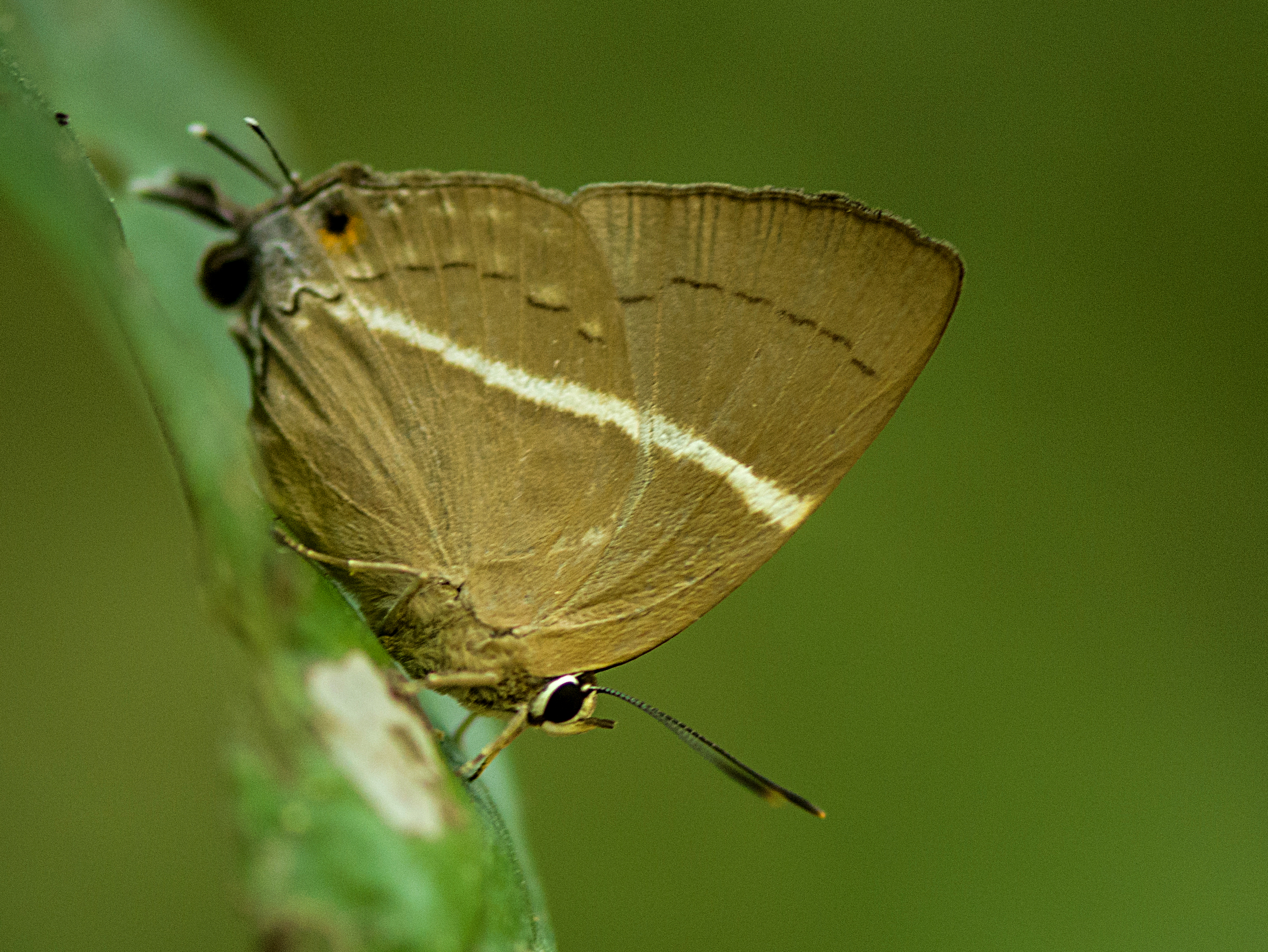

Scientific classification
- Kingdom: Animalia
- Phylum: Arthropoda
- Clade: Pancrustacea
- Class: Insecta
- Order: Lepidoptera
- Family: Lycaenidae
- Genus: Dacalana
- Species: D. penicilligera

Binomial name
- Dacalana penicilligera (de Nicéville, 1890)

= Dacalana penicilligera =

Double-tufted royal

Species of butterfly

Dacalana penicilligera, the Double-tufted royal is a species of blue butterfly (Lycaenidae) found in South East Asia.

== Range ==
The butterfly occurs in India from West Bengal to Northeast India and Myanmar, Thailand and Java. and Thailand.

== See also ==
- Lycaenidae
- List of butterflies of India (Lycaenidae)
