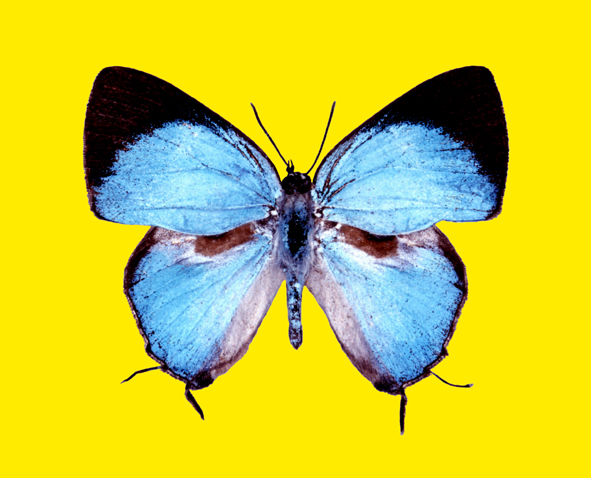
- Male upperside
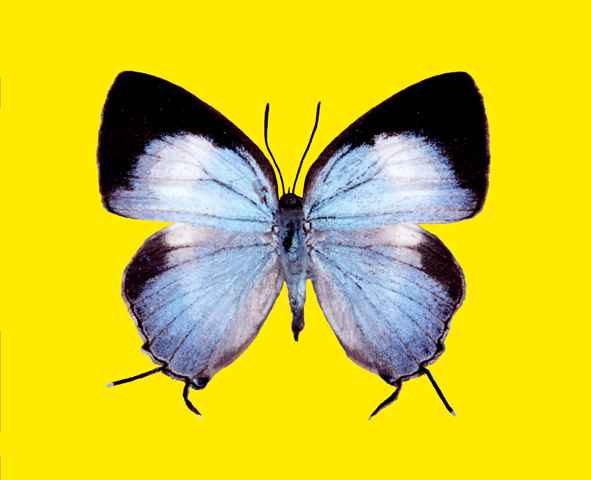
- Female upperside

Scientific classification
- Kingdom: Animalia
- Phylum: Arthropoda
- Class: Insecta
- Order: Lepidoptera
- Family: Lycaenidae
- Genus: Dacalana
- Species: D. kurosawai

Binomial name
- Dacalana kurosawai (H. Hayashi, 1976)

Synonyms
- Dacalana sannio kurosawai H. Hayashi, 1976 was changed the status to Dacalana kurosawai by Schrőder, Treadaway & Nuyda, 1999.

= Dacalana kurosawai =

Species of butterfly

Dacalana kurosawai is a butterfly of the family Lycaenidae. It is endemic to the Philippines and found in Palawan and Calamian islands.

The specific name is dedicated to Dr. Yosihiko KUROSAWA, the director of Animal Research Department at the National Museum of Nature and Science, Tokyo．
