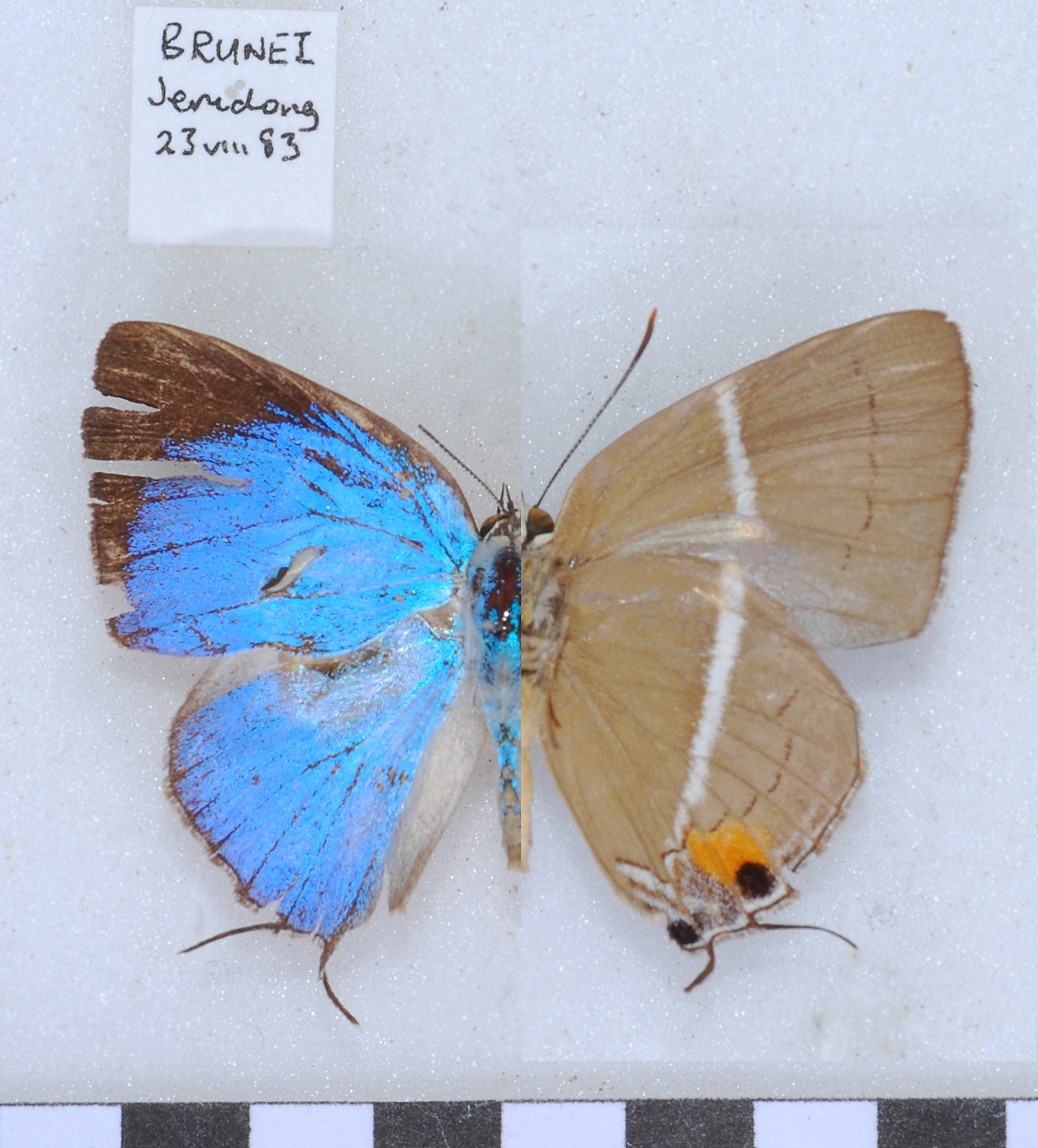
- Dacalana vidura azyada

Scientific classification
- Kingdom: Animalia
- Phylum: Arthropoda
- Class: Insecta
- Order: Lepidoptera
- Family: Lycaenidae
- Genus: Dacalana
- Species: D. vidura

Binomial name
- Dacalana vidura (Horsfield, 1857)

= Dacalana vidura =

Double tufted royal

Species of butterfly

Dacalana vidura, the double tufted royal, is a species of blue butterfly found in South East Asia. It was described by Thomas Horsfield in 1857.

== Range ==
The butterfly occurs in India from Assam eastwards and across to Dawnas and southern Myanmar. The range extends to Peninsular Malaysia, Sumatra and Java.

== Taxonomy ==
The butterfly was previously classified as Pratapa vidura.

== Status ==
Not rare.

== See also ==
- List of butterflies of India (Lycaenidae)
