= Vidura =

Major character of the epic Mahabharata

- Mahabharata character
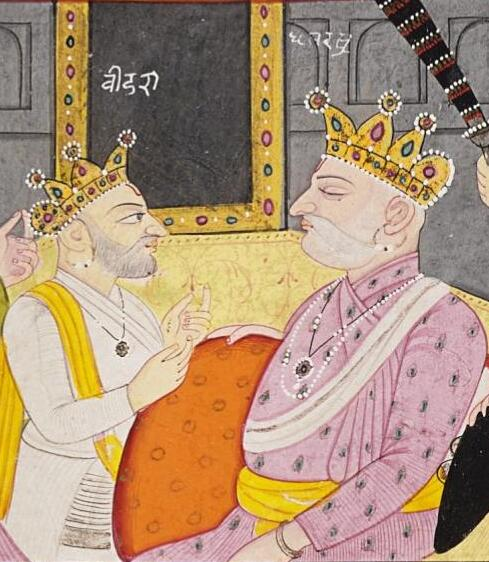
- A Pahari painting depicting Vidura (left) advising Dhritarashtra, c. 1820

Information
- Position: Prime Minister of Kuru kingdom
- Weapon: Sword
- Family: Vyasa (biological father); a Shudra maid (mother); Vichitravirya (legal father); Pandu (half-brother); Dhritarashtra (half-brother)
- Spouse: A daughter of King Devaka
- Children: Unnamed sons and daughters
- Home: Kuru Kingdom
- Dynasty: Chandravamsha

Vidura (Sanskrit: विदुर, lit. 'skilled, intelligent, wise') is a major character in the ancient Hindu epic Mahabharata (c. 400 BCE — 400 CE). He is described as the prime minister of the Kuru kingdom and is the paternal uncle of both the Pandavas and the Kauravas.

== Legend ==
=== Mandavya's Curse ===
The rishi Mandavya cursed Yama so that he would be born as a maid's son for getting him impaled without a valid reason. He was born in the mortal world as Vidura.

=== Birth and early life ===
Vidura was born through Niyoga between the sage Vyasa and a handmaiden to the queens Ambika and Ambalika. Ambika first conceived a child with Vyasa through the niyoga process but because she kept her eyes closed out of fear, she gave birth to the blind Dhritarashtra. Later her sister Ambalika followed the same process with Vyasa, and knew to keep her eyes open. But she was pale with fear during the niyoga, and so gave birth to the albino Pandu. Finally the queens sent their maiden Parishrami in their place, who behaved appropriately during niyoga process and gave birth to the exceptional Vidura. Although political authority in the Mahabharata centers on Brahmin and Kshatriya varnas, Vidura holds a senior state administrative position despite being born to a Brahmin father and a Shudra woman, showing that varna hierarchies permitted flexibility. The queens were wives of king Vichitravirya – the grandfather to the Kauravas and Pandavas who eventually fought each other in the Battle of Kurukshetra, the climax of the Mahabharata on the threshold of which the Bhagavad Gita was given by Krishna to the Pandava prince Arjuna. King Vichitravirya was also the adopted father of Dhritarashtra and Pandu. After Krishna, Vidura was the most respected as an adviser by the Pandavas, whom he forewarned on various occasions of Duryodhana's plots to exterminate them, such as Duryodhana's plan to burn them alive in the house of lac or lacquer.

=== Game of dice ===
Vidura tried to stop Yudhishthira from playing the game of dice, but his efforts were of no use. Except the prince Vikarna, Vidura was the only one who protested against the humiliation of Draupadi in the Kaurava court. In that moment, Duryodhana viciously rebuked Vidura, calling him ungrateful. Dhritarashtra moved to rebuke Duryodhana for insulting their uncle, but, remembering Vidura saying that a blind man cannot be king, holds his tongue, and instead reprimanded Duryodhana for insulting the prime minister. It is that incident that Vidura brought up years later when he severed ties with the Kurus and sided with the Pandavas at the onset of the Kurukshetra War. Unlike Bhishma, Dronacharya, Kripacharya, and Karna, Vidura did not have an obligation to Hastinapura or Duryodhana, but to his family. Hearing Dhritarashtra not acknowledge that relationship, Vidura felt compelled to side with dharma and the Pandavas.

=== Krishna's visit ===
According to Krishna, Vidura was considered as Dharmaraja, which means the king of righteousness. Krishna respected Vidura for his devotion to people's welfare and his proficiency in every sphere of knowledge. When Krishna visited Hastinapura as a peace emissary of the Pandavas, he shunned Duryodhana's offer to stay in the royal palace, preferring instead the home of Vidura, on account of him being the only neutral man in the Kaurava court. The reason Krishna stayed in Vidura's chambers for the night instead of Duryodhana's is due to the thoughts which were running through their heads and the difference between them. Duryodhana's intention was to heave luxury upon Krishna and convince him to join the Kaurava side. Sensing this intention, Krishna refused. Krishna knew the food that Vidura and his wife presented was presented with love and affection with no ulterior motive.

=== Kurukshetra War ===
In the Sanatsujatiya section of the Mahabharata, shortly before the Kurukshetra War began, Vidura invoked the sage Sanatsujata to answer Dhritarashtra's questions about death.

During Krishna's visit, Vidura repeatedly advised everyone in the Court to heed the messenger. Continuously irritated, Duryodhana bursts out, blaming the low-born mother of Vidura as the cause for him betraying the Kauravas who have been feeding him. In protest against verbal assault, Vidura resigned on the spot from the post of Prime minister and broke his bow, vowing not to take part in the Kurukshetra War. Lesser known versions of Mahabharatha praise Vidura as an archer so great that if he had participated on the side of Kauravas in the war, the Pandavas would have been crushed. Vidura's bow was crafted by Vishnu himself, and it was destroyed at the behest of Vishnu's visit.

=== Death ===
After the Kurukshetra War, Yudhishthira became the emperor and upon his request, Vidura resumed his post as prime minister. After many years, Vidura accompanied Dhritarashtra, Gandhari and Kunti who retired to the forests to live a simple life. Sanjaya also accompanied them. When Yudhishthira went to forest after two years to visit them, he found Vidura's body to be lifeless. When he went near to the body, Vidura's spirit entered Yudhishthira's body and Yudhishthira realised that he and Vidura belonged to same entity, Yama. Yudhishthira left Vidura's body in the wood as a heavenly voice told Yudhishthira not to cremate Vidura's body.

== Vidura Niti ==
In Chapters 33 through 40 of Udyoga Parva in the Mahabharata, Vidura outlines things wise people and leaders should do, and things they should not. Collectively, these are known as Vidura Niti (Vidura's Statecraft). Some examples of his recommendations for leaders:

1. He should wish for the prosperity of all, and should never set heart on inflicting misery on any group.
2. He should pay attention to those who have fallen in distress and adversity. He should not ignore persistent sufferings of those that depend on him, even if the suffering is small.
3. He should show compassion to all creatures, do what is good for all creatures rather than a select few.
4. He should never impede the development and growth of agriculture and economic activity by anyone.
5. He should be always be prepared to protect those that depend on him for their safety and security.
6. He should be fair and accessible to his people. By means of virtue should he attain success, by means of virtue should he sustain it.
7. He should consider the welfare of his people as his personal responsibility.
8. He should encourage learning and transmission of knowledge.
9. He should encourage profit and virtue. Prosperity depends on good deeds. Good deeds depend on prosperity.
10. He should avoid friendship with the sinful.
11. He should never misuse wealth, use harsh speech nor inflict extreme or cruel punishments.
12. He should only appoint those as ministers (senior positions in his staff) whom he has examined well for their history of virtue, dispositions, activity and whether they give others their due.

Vidura Niti also includes a few hundred verses with suggestions for personal development and the characteristics of a wise person. For example, in Chapter 33, Vidura suggests a wise person refrains from anger, exultation, pride, shame, stupefaction and vanity. He has reverence and faith, he is unhampered in his endeavors by either adversity or prosperity. He believes virtue and profit can go together, exerts and acts to the best of his ability, disregards nothing. He understands quickly, listens carefully, acts with purpose. He does not grieve for what is lost, and does not lose his sense during crisis. He is constantly learning, he seeks enlightenment from everything he experiences. He acts after deciding, and decides after thinking. He neither behaves with arrogance, nor with excessive humility. He never speaks ill of others, nor praises himself. He does not exult in honours to himself, nor grieves at insults; he is not agitated by what others do to him just like a calm lake near river Ganges.

== In Buddhism ==
In Buddhist literature, Vidura appears as Vidhura-paṇḍita (also spelled Vidura-paṇḍita), a previous birth of the future Gautama Buddha.In Indapatta (Indraprastha), the capital of the Kuru kingdom, he serves as the chief minister and spiritual advisor to King Dhanañjaya Koravya (also described as Koravya of the Yudhiṭṭhila lineage). Vidura is said to be immensely loved and admired by the king as his own life.

He is the protagonist of the Vidhurapaṇḍita Jātaka (Jātaka No. 545), one of the longest and final narratives of the Mahānipāta of the Jātaka collection, which illustrates the perfection of truthfulness (sacca-pāramī) and wisdom. In the story, Vidhurapaṇḍita settles a dispute over virtue among four monarchs—King Dhanañjaya Koravya, Sakka, the Nāga king Varuṇa, and the Supaṇṇa king—by declaring their virtues equal like the spokes of a wheel. Impressed by his eloquence, Varuṇa's queen Vimalā feigns illness and demands Vidhura's heart, which she actually desires in order to hear his teachings on the Dhamma. The yaksha general Puṇṇaka wins Vidhura from King Dhanañjaya in a game of dice and attempts to slay him, but is converted by Vidhura's fearlessness and discourse on righteousness, leading to Vidhura's safe return to Indapatta.

Vidura also appears in several other Jātaka tales:

- Dasabrāhmaṇa Jātaka (Jātaka No. 495): King Koravya of Indapatta, dissatisfied that his lavish almsgiving is going only to unvirtuous recipients, consults Vidhura on how to find truly worthy ascetics. Vidhura classifies ten types of worldly Brahmins who fall short of the ideal and guides the king to invite five hundred Paccekabuddhas from the Nandamūla cave in the Himalayas to receive the royal alms.
- Dhūmakāri Jātaka (Jātaka No. 413): Vidhura counsels King Dhanañjaya Koravya against neglecting his loyal veteran warriors in favor of newly arrived mercenaries, illustrating the folly through a parable of a goatherd who favors wild deer over his own flock.
- Sambhava Jātaka (Jātaka No. 515): When King Dhanañjaya Koravya seeks an explanation of the "Good and True" (atthañ ca dhammañ ca), his chaplain Sucirata consults Vidhura in Benares. Unable to answer the profound question himself, Vidhura directs the envoy down a chain of progressively wiser sages—first to his eldest son Bhadrakāra, then to the young brahmin Sañjaya, and finally to his seven-year-old son Sambhava (here identified as the Bodhisatta, while Vidhura is identified as Mahākassapa instead), who resolves the king's inquiry.

In the Majjhima Nikāya (Māratajjanīya Sutta, MN 50), Vidhura is additionally mentioned by the elder Mahāmoggallāna as a former chief disciple of the past Buddha Kakusandha. Because of its popularity, the narrative of the Vidhurapaṇḍita Jātaka was widely depicted in early Buddhist art, including reliefs at Bharhut and Amaravati as well as murals in the Ajanta Caves.

== In popular culture ==
Vidura is considered as the Mahachohan in the Theosophical world. Mahachohan is said to be the chief of a Social Hierarchy of the trans-Himalayan mystics. Most characters in the Mahabharata were reincarnations of one God or the other. Vidura was the reincarnation of Dharmaraja, more popularly known as Yamadharmaraja, who was born as a maid's son due to the curse of sage Mandavya. When Vishnu decided to take birth as Krishna, other deities also incarnated along with him. This is seen both in the Mahabharata and in the Ramayana. For example, in the Ramayana, the sage Narada was born as Vibhishana.

Vidura Niti, or Vidura's Statecraft, narrated in the form of a dialogue between Vidura and King Dhritarashtra, is considered the precursor in some ways of Chanakya Neeti by Chanakya.

Vidura is held to be a paragon of truth, dutifulness, impartial judgement and steadfast dharma. He is considered the embodiment of the inner consciousness of the Mahabharata. The curse carried by Narada was also transferred to Vidura. The curse that though he being bestowed with ultimate knowledge and wisdom about the past, the present and the future, he would not be believed.

Kaka Vidura, a Hindi minor poem by Rambhadracharya, has Vidura and his wife Sulabha as central characters.

Vidura Bhiksha is a Malayalam poetry work by Ullur S. Parameswarayyar.

A banyan tree standing in the village of Vidhurashwatha in Karnataka, India is believed to have been planted by Vidura.

== See also ==
- Dhristarashtra
- Sanjaya
- Bhishma
