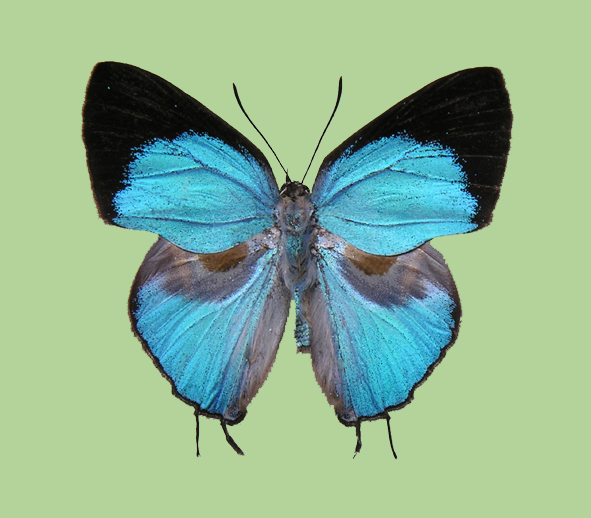
- Male upperside
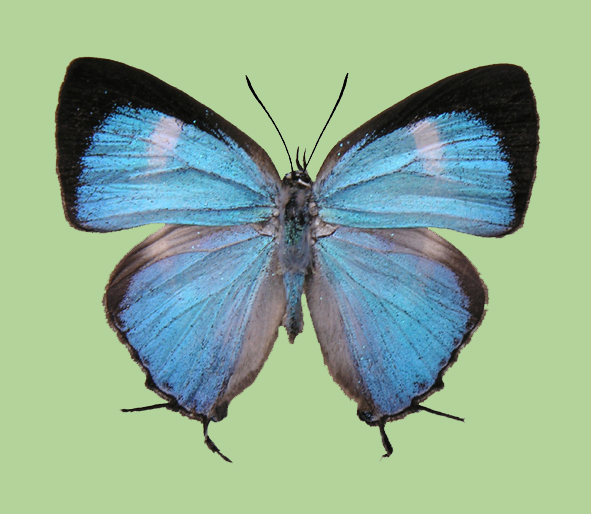
- Female upperside

Scientific classification
- Kingdom: Animalia
- Phylum: Arthropoda
- Class: Insecta
- Order: Lepidoptera
- Family: Lycaenidae
- Genus: Dacalana
- Species: D. liaoi

Binomial name
- Dacalana liaoi H. Hayashi, Schrőder & Treadaway, 1983

= Dacalana liaoi =

Species of butterfly

Dacalana liaoi is a butterfly of the family Lycaenidae first described by Hisakazu Hayashi, Heinz G. Schroeder and Colin G. Treadaway in 1983. Its forewing length is 17–18 mm. The species is endemic to the Philippines and distributed on Panay and Negros islands. It is not a common species.
