= Sanatsujatiya =

Part of the fifth book of the Mahābhārata

The Sanatsujatiya (Sanatsujātīya) refers to a portion of the Mahabharata (Mahābhārata), a Hindu epic. It appears in the Udyoga Parva (book), and is composed of five chapters (Adhyāya 41–46). One reason for the Sanatsujatiya's importance is that it was commented upon by Adi Shankara, the preeminent expositor of Advaita Vedanta, and one of the most important Hindu sages, philosophers, and mystics.

Buitenen wrote that "The Sanatsujatiya had a minor reputation as a philosophical classic.... The text certainly deserves more study than it has received" (p. 182). He also wrote that

The Sanatsujatiya should probably be best approached as a brief, late-upaniṣadic text that very early attracted to itself, by way of appendix, commentary, and continuation, other texts that were considered to be of the same inspiration.... Its core seems to be the triṣṭubh verses of the beginning, in which the problem of death is addressed. This is followed, in ślokas, by reflections on brahman and wisdom, on the twelve vices and twelve virtues, and on Brahmacharya (brahmacarya). It ends with a mystical hymn on the manifestations of the Supreme... with the refrain: "The yogins behold the sempiternal blessed Lord." (p. 182)

== Synopsis of Sanatsujatiya ==
King Dhritrashtra (Dhṛtarāṣṭra) has been conversing with his half-brother Vidura, who has been responding to his requests for various kinds of counsel.

Ch. 41: King Dhritrashtra asks for more information. Vidura replies that he, as born from a Shudra woman, must not speak of secret matters relating to Atman but one who has taken birth as a Brahmin, if he states these secret matters, is not censured by the devatas. Therefore these matters may be spoken by the eternal sage Sanatsujāta. Vidura then invokes Sanatsujāta by meditating on him. When Sanatsujāta appears, Vidura requests that he dispel Dhritrashtra's doubts.

Ch. 42: Dhritrashtra asks Sanatsujāta why he teaches that death does not exist. Sanatsujāta replies that distraction equals death, and elaborates.

Ch. 43: Sanatsujāta continues, explaining that Veda (scriptures) cannot save someone from evil, but can lead to better rebirth. There are many scriptures, but one truth, on which one should meditate, which gives knowledge of brahman.

Ch. 44: Sanatsujāta continues, explaining the need for Brahmacharya (self-restrained behaviour) and a guru (spiritual teacher).

Ch. 45: Sanatsujāta describes the state of the yogin (realised person) in hymn-like language. A continuing refrain is "The yogins behold the sempiternal blessed Lord" (p. 292). Other affirmations in this chapter include "No one beholds him with his eye, but they who with wisdom, mind and heart gain knowledge of him have become immortal" (p. 292), and "If one sees oneself in all creatures yoked to their various tasks, why should he worry any more?" (p. 294), and

"My soul is the place, my soul is the birth,
I'm the ageless foundation the Vedas declare"

(p. 294)

== Editions ==
- Johannes Buitenen's (1978) translation of the Mahabharata contains a summary (p. 285) and translation (pp. 285–294) of the Sanatsujatiya (partly available online via Google book preview)
- Kashinath Trimbak Telang (1882) translated the Sanatsujatiya (freely/fully available online – see External links), which appeared in volume 8 of the Sacred Books of the East series edited by Max Müller. The volume was reprinted in a 2001 edition.
