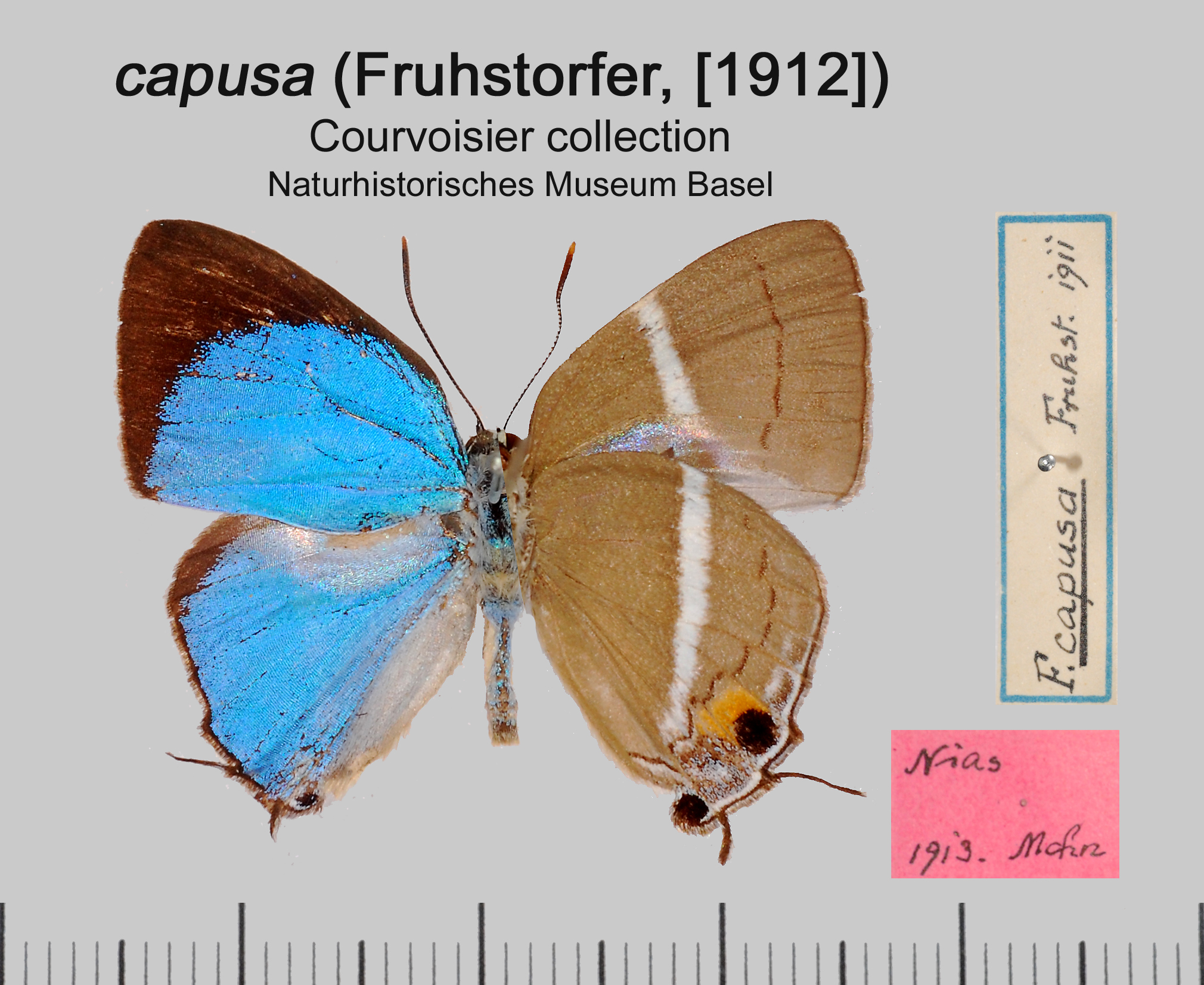
- Dacalana cremera capusa from the Courvoisier Collection, Basel, Switzerland

Scientific classification
- Domain: Eukaryota
- Kingdom: Animalia
- Phylum: Arthropoda
- Class: Insecta
- Order: Lepidoptera
- Family: Lycaenidae
- Genus: Dacalana
- Species: D. cremera

Binomial name
- Dacalana cremera (de Nicéville, 1894)

Synonyms
- Camena cremera de Nicéville, 1894; Camena cotys capusa Fruhstorfer, [1912]; Pratapa sannio ricardi Eliot, 1959

= Dacalana cremera =

Species of butterfly

Dacalana cremera is a butterfly in the family Lycaenidae. It was described by Lionel de Nicéville in 1894. It is found in the Indomalayan realm.

== Subspecies ==
- D. c. cremera (Java)
- D. c. ricardi (Eliot, 1959) (Peninsular Malaya)
- D. c. capusa (Fruhstorfer, [1912]) (Nias Island)
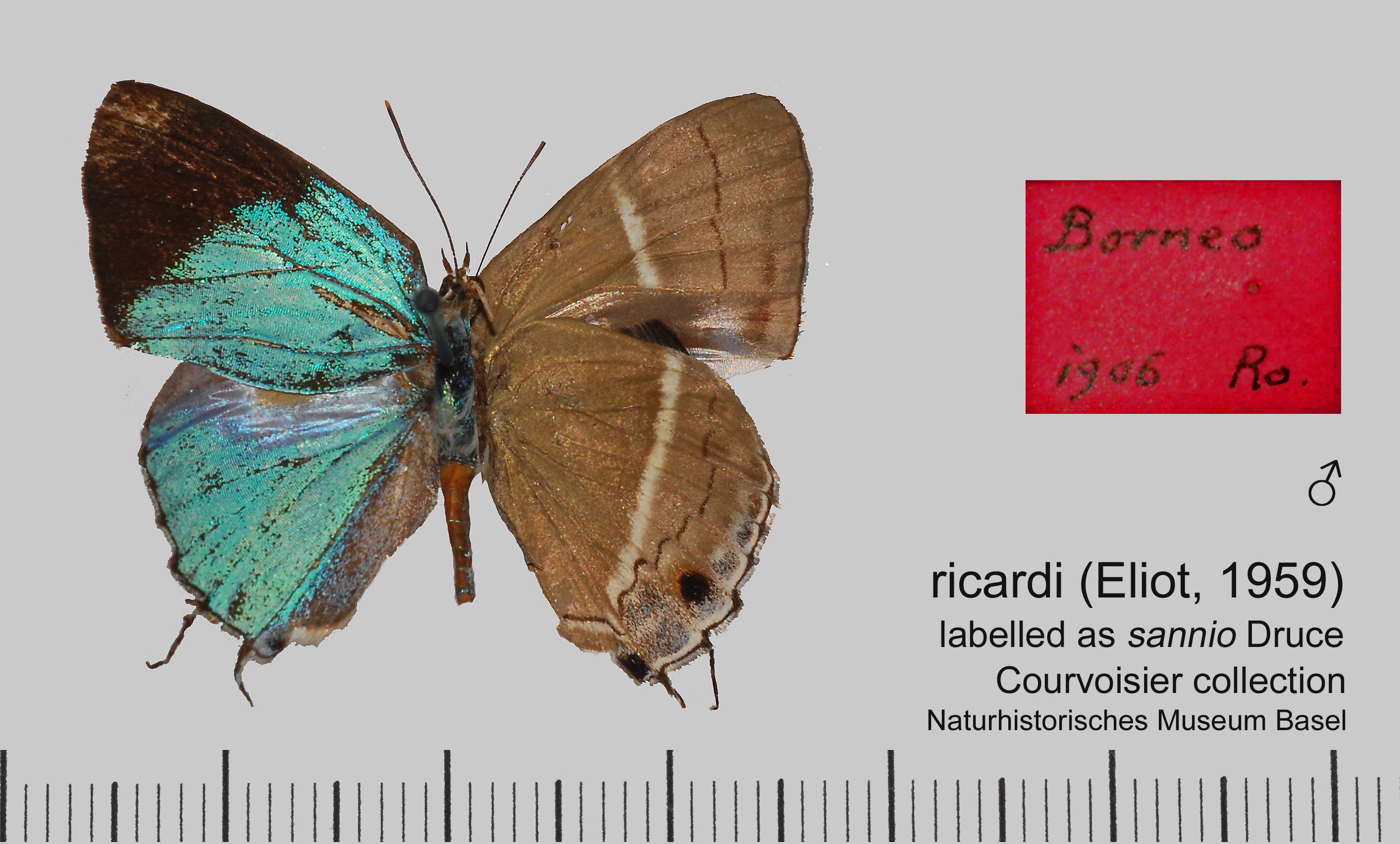
Dacalana cremera ricardi
