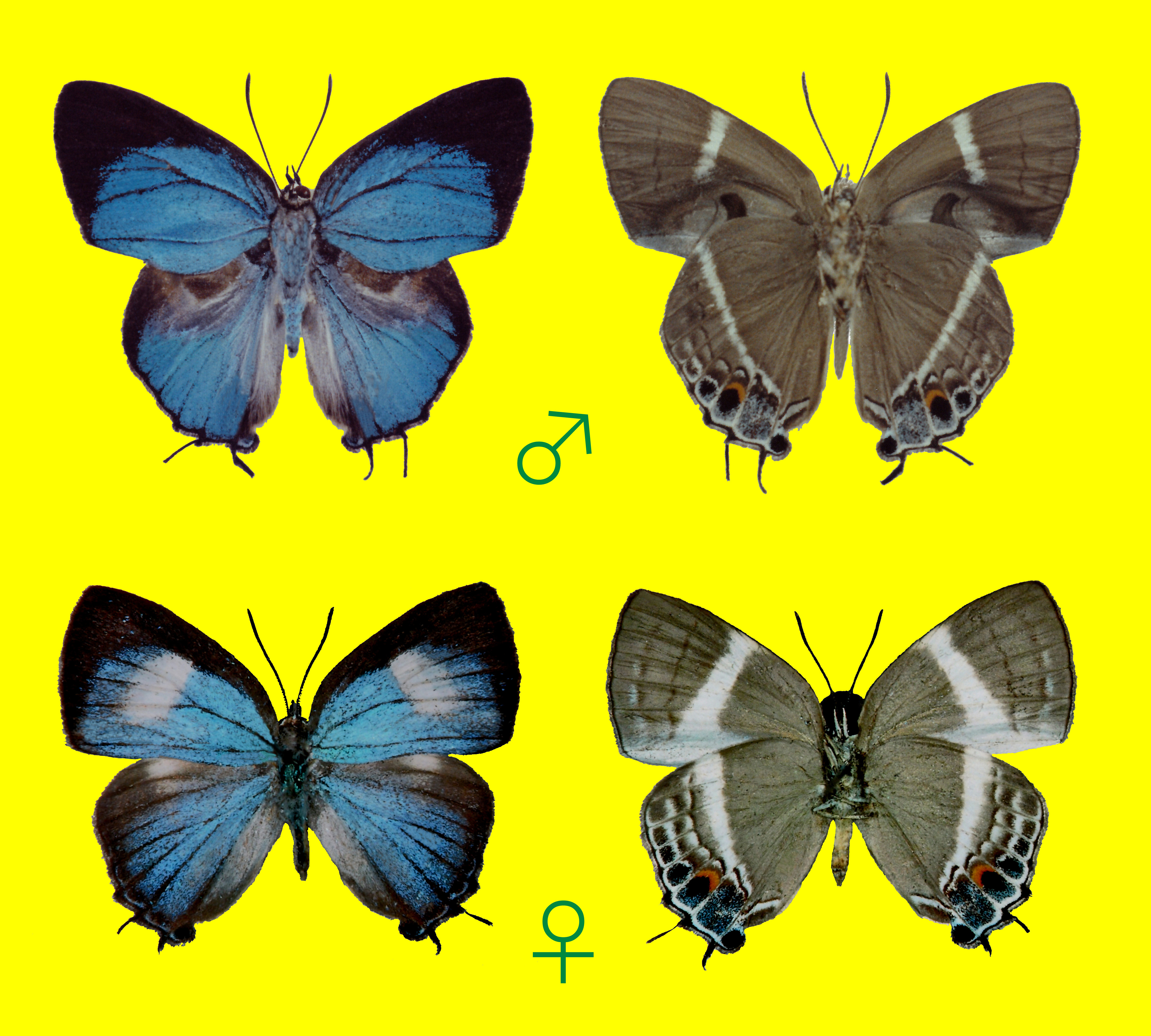
- Male and female

Scientific classification
- Kingdom: Animalia
- Phylum: Arthropoda
- Class: Insecta
- Order: Lepidoptera
- Family: Lycaenidae
- Genus: Dacalana
- Species: D. irmae

Binomial name
- Dacalana irmae H. Hayashi, Schrőder & Treadaway, 1983

= Dacalana irmae =

Species of butterfly

Dacalana irmae is a butterfly of the family Lycaenidae first described by Hisakazu Hayashi, Heinz G. Schroeder and Colin G. Treadaway in 1983. It is endemic to the Philippines and found only on Sibuyan Island. The forewing length is 17.5–20 mm.
