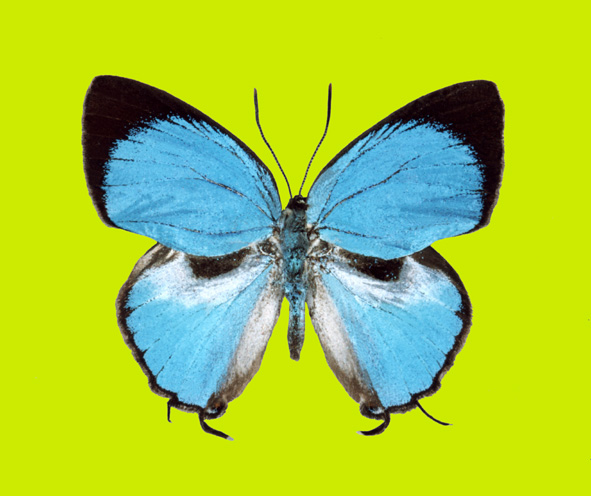
- Male upperside
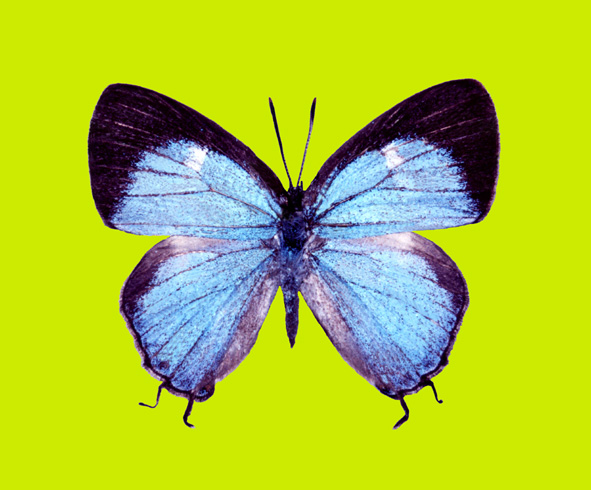
- Female upperside

Scientific classification
- Kingdom: Animalia
- Phylum: Arthropoda
- Class: Insecta
- Order: Lepidoptera
- Family: Lycaenidae
- Genus: Dacalana
- Species: D. mio

Binomial name
- Dacalana mio H. Hayashi, Schrőder & Treadaway, 1983

= Dacalana mio =

Species of butterfly

Dacalana mio is a butterfly of the family Lycaenidae first described by Hisakazu Hayashi, Heinz G. Schroeder and Colin G. Treadaway in 1983. Forewing length: 16–18 mm. It is rare species, endemic to the Philippines and found only on the islands of Mindanao and Leyte.

The specific name is dedicated to the eldest daughter of the first author.
