= Vidhurashwatha =

Vidhurashwatha Vidurashwatha
- town
- Location in Karnataka, India
- Coordinates: 13.670924°N 77.498631°E
- Country: India
- State: Karnataka

Languages
  - Official: Kannada
- Time zone: UTC+5:30 (IST)

Vidhurashwatha is a village in the Chikkaballapura District of Karnataka State in India. It is located near Gauribidanur, and is a regional piligimage center.

As the name suggests, it is historically connected with Vidhura from Mahabharata who is known to have planted a banyan tree which is still living. This place is also sometimes referred to as Jallianwalla Bagh of the south in recognition to the death of 25 people in firing by the British police during the Quit India Movement.
