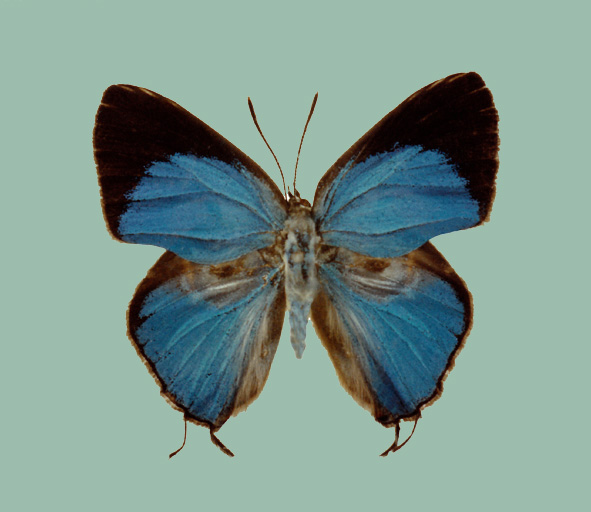
- Male upperside
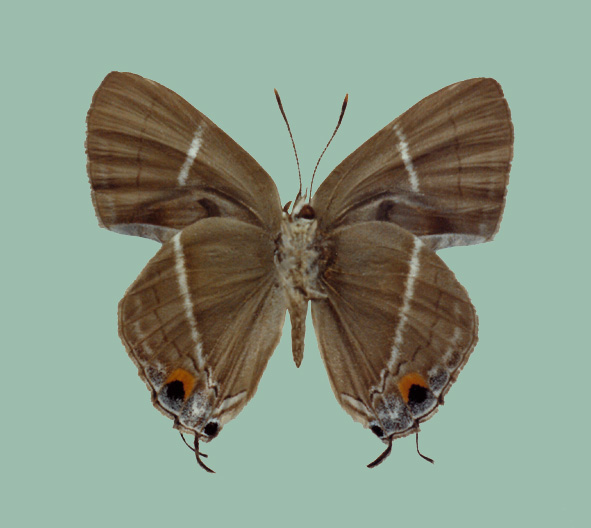
- Male underside

Scientific classification
- Kingdom: Animalia
- Phylum: Arthropoda
- Clade: Pancrustacea
- Class: Insecta
- Order: Lepidoptera
- Family: Lycaenidae
- Genus: Dacalana
- Species: D. treadawayi

Binomial name
- Dacalana treadawayi H. Hayashi, 1984

= Dacalana treadawayi =

Species of butterfly

Dacalana treadawayi is a butterfly of the family Lycaenidae first described by Hisakazu Hayashi in 1984. It is endemic to Mindanao island in the Philippines.

The specific name is dedicated to C. G. Treadaway.
