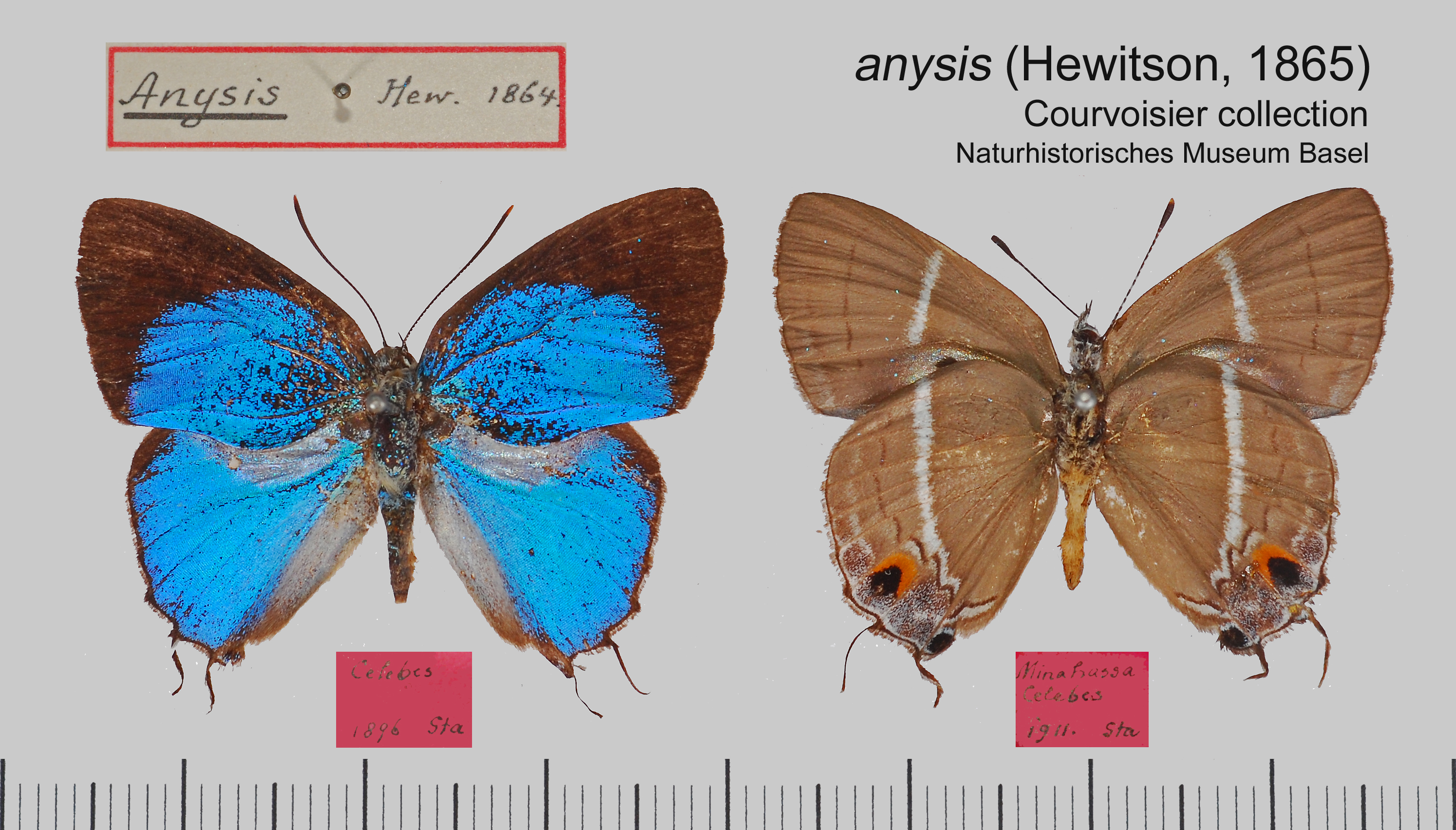
- Dacalana anysisCourvoisier Collection, Basel

Scientific classification
- Kingdom: Animalia
- Phylum: Arthropoda
- Class: Insecta
- Order: Lepidoptera
- Family: Lycaenidae
- Genus: Dacalana
- Species: D. anysis

Binomial name
- Dacalana anysis (Hewitson, 1865)

Synonyms
- Iolaus anysis Hewitson, 1865; Jolaus cervinus Röber, 1887

= Dacalana anysis =

Species of butterfly

Dacalana anysis is a butterfly in the family Lycaenidae. It is found on the Indonesian islands of Sulawesi and Banggai.

The larvae feed on Scurrula species.

== Subspecies ==
The following subspecies are recognised:

- Dacalana anysis anysis (Sulawesi)
- Dacalana anysis cervina (Röber, 1887) (Banggai)
