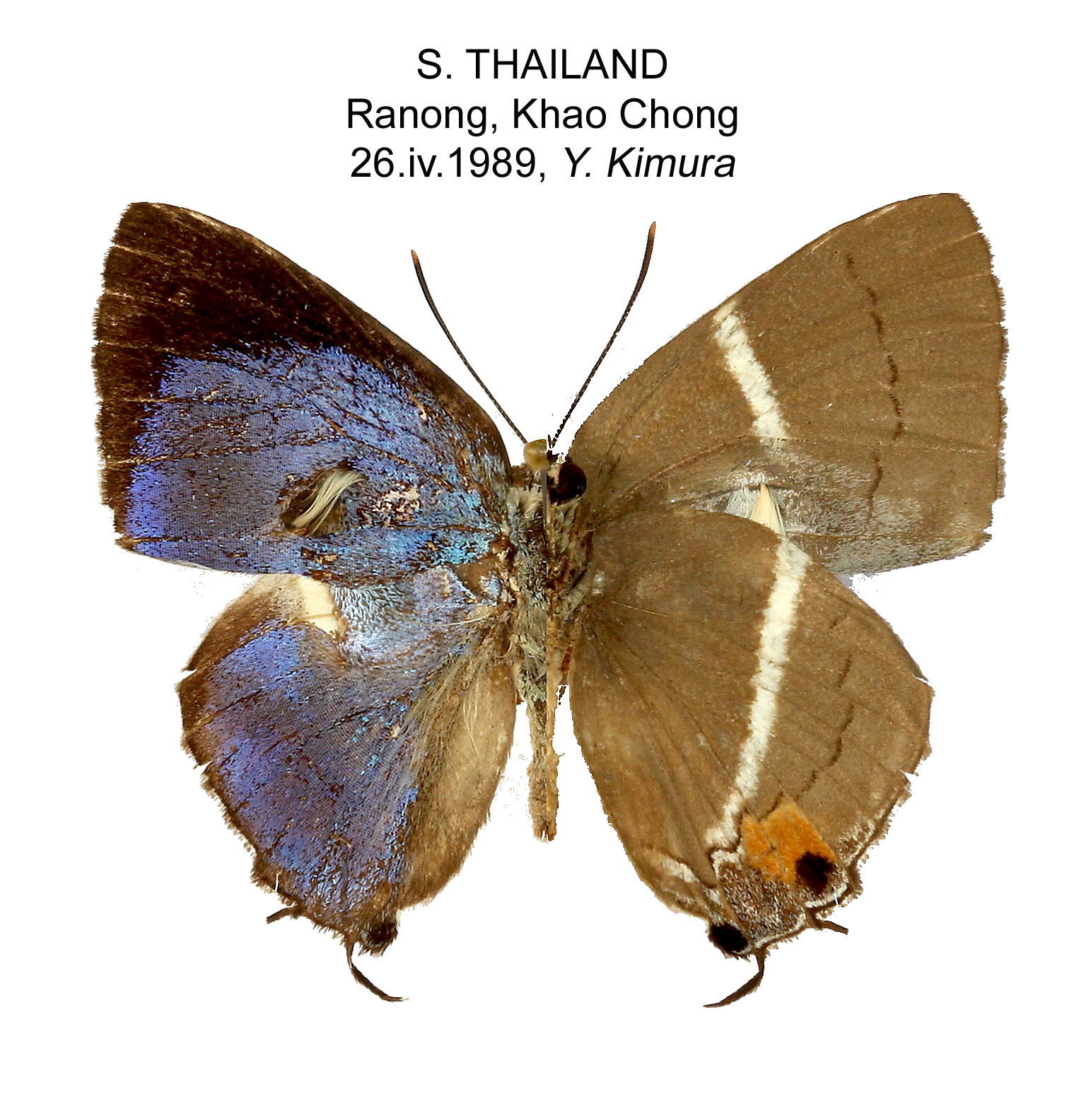
- Dacalana sinhara

Scientific classification
- Domain: Eukaryota
- Kingdom: Animalia
- Phylum: Arthropoda
- Class: Insecta
- Order: Lepidoptera
- Family: Lycaenidae
- Genus: Dacalana
- Species: D. sinhara

Binomial name
- Dacalana sinhara Fruhstorfer, [1914]

Synonyms
- Dacalana vidura sinhara Fruhstorfer, 1914

= Dacalana sinhara =

Species of butterfly

Dacalana sinhara is a species of butterfly belonging to the lycaenid family described by Hans Fruhstorfer in 1914. It is found in the Indomalayan realm (Burma, Thailand, Peninsular Malaya).
