= Mandavya =

Sage in Hinduism

- Dharma the god shows Mandavya the sage the karmic reason he suffered impalement
- Affiliation: Rishi
- Texts: Mahabharata, Puranas

Mandavya (Sanskrit: माण्डव्य, romanized: Māṇḍavya), also called Aṇi Māṇḍavya ("Mandavya with a stake impaled"), is a sage in Hinduism. He is best known for a legend where he is wrongfully punished by a king by impalement.

== Legend ==
=== Impalement ===
According to the Mahabharata, Mandavya was once performing a tapas with his arms raised, standing in front of his ashrama for many years. During this period, some thieves happened to pass by his ashrama, having stolen property belonging to the king. Finding that the king’s men were pursuing them, the thieves fled, after leaving their stolen property in the sage's ashrama. The king’s men seized Mandavya, believing him to be an accomplice. Mandavya refused to talk to his accusers. When the thieves were caught, Mandavya was also produced before the king, and they were all condemned to death. The thieves and the sage were struck at the tip with a trident, and while the thieves died, Mandavya stayed alive.

According to the Brahmanda Purana, while the sage was undergoing this injustice, Ugrashravas, the cruel husband of Shilavati, wished to visit the house of his favourite prostitute, and the unsuspecting Shilavati agreed to carry him to her house. When the couple came across Mandavya, the latter understood the man's intentions, and cursed him to die before the next sunrise. Horrified, Shilavati, with her piety, ensured that Surya, the sun god, would not rise the following morning. Since this led to universal chaos, the devas approached Anasuya, who convinced Shilavati to let the sun rise again.

Shiva blessed the sage with longevity, and several sages appeared before Mandavya, making inquiries regarding him. When the king realised that Mandavya was innocent, he rushed to seek the sage's forgiveness. His men tried to pull the trident from his body, but were unable to do so. Finally, the sage had to be released by cutting the trident, with its tip (Aṇi) remaining in his form. Hence, he came to be known as Aṇi Mandavya.

=== Cursing Dharma ===
Mandavya approached Dharma (sometimes identified with Yama), asking why an innocent man like him had suffered the hardship that he had gone through. Dharma stated that Mandavya had tortured insects like bugs and ants when he was a boy, and his impalement had been the punishment. The sage countered that the Shashtras stated that no man should have to suffer for any sin committed before the age of five, arguing that he had been unjustly punished. Since Dharma had attempted to murder him, a Brahmin, the greatest of sins, he cursed the deity to be born as a Shudra on earth. Accordingly, Dharma incarnated as Vidura in the Mahabharata.

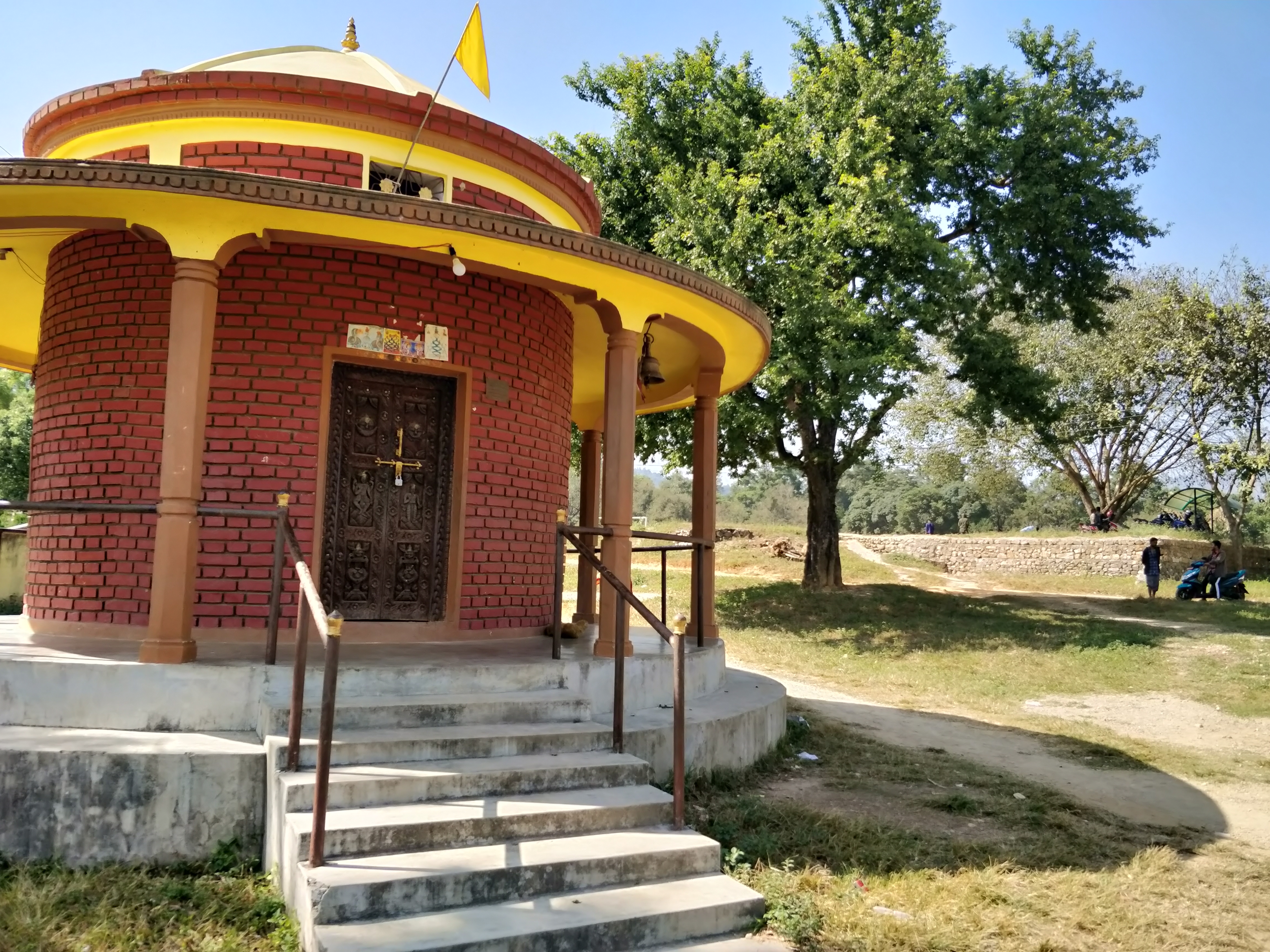
Mandavya Rishi Temple in Damkada Tansen Nepal

== In Buddhism ==
In Buddhist literature, sagw Māṇḍavya appears in the Kaṇhadīpāyana Jātaka (Jātaka No. 444) as Maṇḍabya, an ascetic companion of the Bodhisatta (who is born as the sage Kaṇhadīpāyana) and a past birth of Sāriputta.

Paralleling his legend in the Mahabharata, Māṇḍavya is falsely accused of robbery after fleeing thieves discard stolen goods near his hut outside Benares and is impaled on a stake by royal decree. Rather than surviving through divine intervention, he endures the impalement due to past karma—specifically, having pierced a fly on a splinter in his childhood—while maintaining complete equanimity. When the king recognizes his innocence, the stake cannot be extracted and is cut off flush with his body, leaving the tip embedded inside him and earning him the epithet Āṇi-Māṇḍavya ("Māṇḍavya with the peg").

The narrative also offers a retroactive folk etymology for the name Kaṇhadīpāyana (i.e. Kṛṣṇa Dvaipāyana). Unlike the Mahābhārata, which attributes the name to his dark complexion and birth on an island, the Jātaka states that the sage was originally fair-skinned and named simply Dīpāyana; while sitting beside the impaled Māṇḍavya through the night, drops of blood fell onto his golden skin and dried into black spots, earning him the prefix Kaṇha ("Black").
