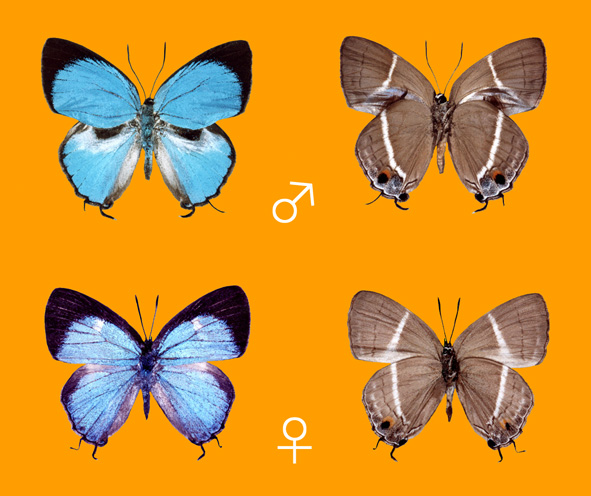
- Dacalana mio

Scientific classification
- Kingdom: Animalia
- Phylum: Arthropoda
- Clade: Pancrustacea
- Class: Insecta
- Order: Lepidoptera
- Family: Lycaenidae
- Tribe: Theclini
- Genus: Dacalana; Moore, 1884

Synonyms
- Dacalana Distant, 1884; Arrhenothrix de Nicéville, 1890

= Dacalana =

Butterfly genus in family Lycaenidae

Dacalana is a genus of butterflies in the family Lycaenidae. The genus is distributed from Assam through Sundaland to Sulawesi, and is especially richly represented in the Philippines.

== Species ==
- Dacalana akayamai H. Hayashi, Schröder & Treadaway
- Dacalana anysis Hewitson
- Dacalana aristarchus Fruhstorfer Philippines
- Dacalana burmana Moore Burma
- Dacalana capusa Fruhstorfer
- Dacalana cotys Hewitson
- Dacalana cremera de Nicéville
- Dacalana irmae H. Hayashi, Schröder & Treadaway
- Dacalana kurosawai H. Hayashi
- Dacalana liaoi H. Hayashi, Schröder & Treadaway
- Dacalana lowii H.H.Druce Borneo
- Dacalana lucillae H. Hayashi, Schröder & Treadaway
- Dacalana mio H. Hayashi, Schröder & Treadaway
- Dacalana monsapona Schröder & Treadaway Philippines, Mindanao
- Dacalana penicilligera de Nicéville
- Dacalana polyorketes Fruhstorfer Philippines, Mindanao
- Dacalana sannio Druce Philippines, Sulu Archipelago
- Dacalana sinhara Fruhstorfer
- Dacalana treadawayi H. Hayashi
- Dacalana vui Saito and Inayoshi, 2022
