= Vidura (name) =

Vidura is an Indian and Sri Lankan name that may refer to the following notable people:

Given name

- Vidura Nawale, Indian politician
- Vidura Wickremanayake (born 1959), Sri Lankan politician
