= Kaka Vidura =

1980 poem by Jagadguru Rambhadracharya

काका विदुर
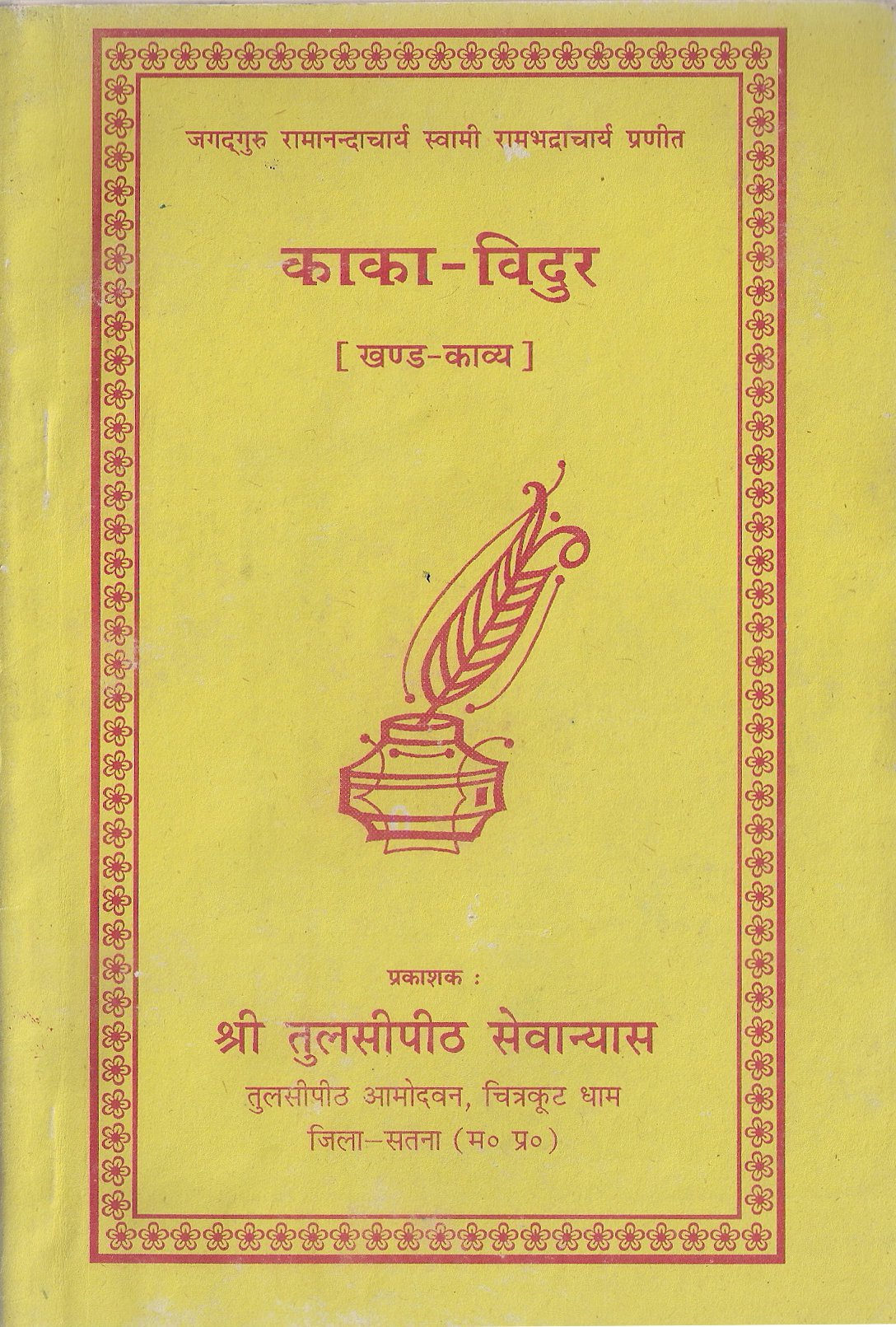
- Cover page of Kaka Vidura, second edition (1998)
- Author: Jagadguru Rambhadracharya
- Original title: Kākā Vidura (Epic Poem)
- Language: Hindi
- Genre: Minor Poetry
- Publisher: Shri Tulsi Peeth Seva Nyas, Chitrakoot
- Publication date: 1980
- Publication place: India
- Media type: Print (hardcover)
- Pages: 30 pp (second edition)

Kākā Vidura (Hindi: काका विदुर) is a Hindi minor poem composed by Jagadguru Rambhadracharya (born 1950) in the year 1980. It consists of 108 verses in Kavitta and Savaiya metres. The poem revolves around the characters of Vidura and his wife Sulabha from the Mahabharata.
