= Sanjaya =

Character from Hindu epic Mahabharata

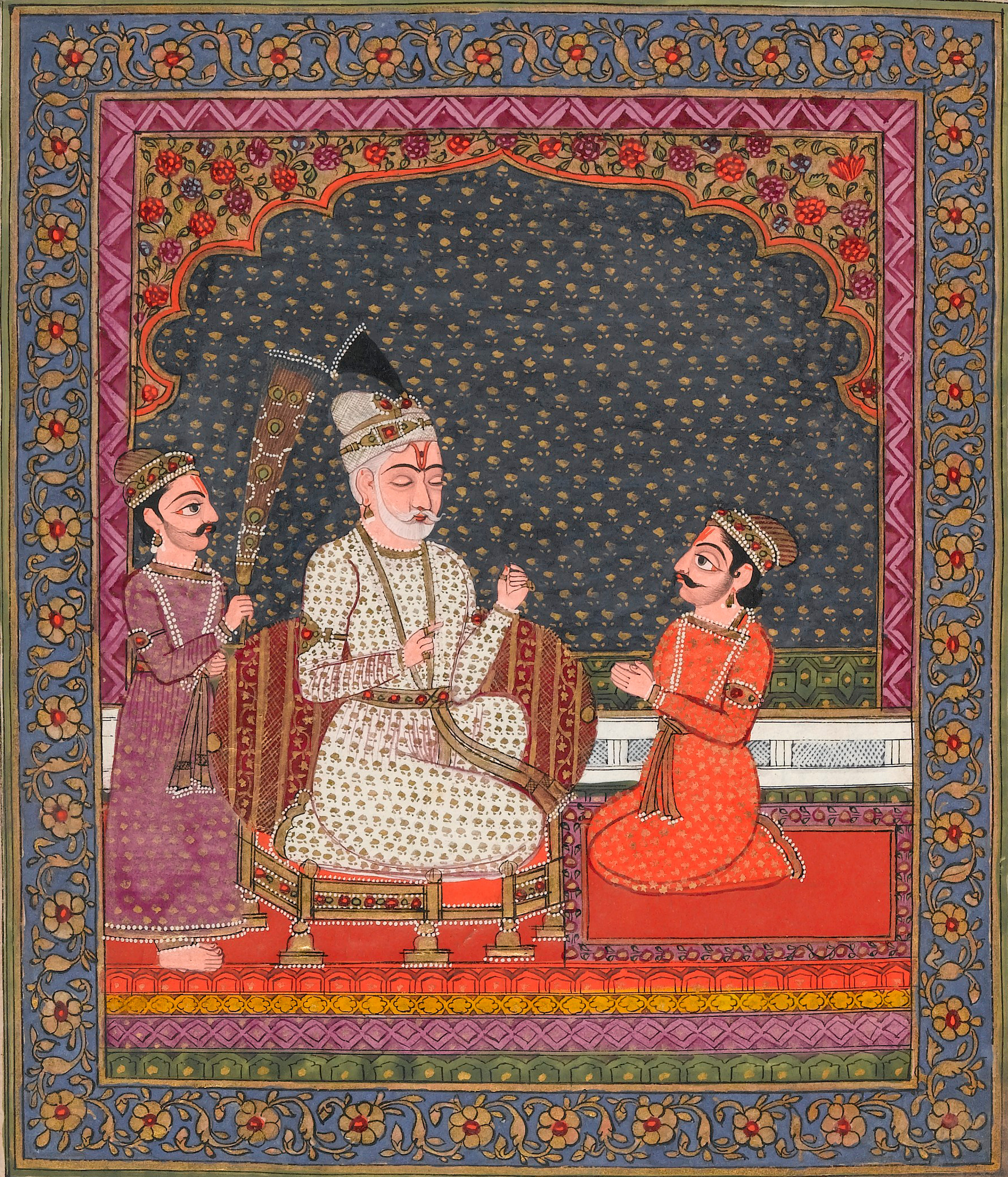
- The blind king Dhritarashtra listens as the visionary narrator Sanjaya relates the events of the battle between the Kaurava and the Pandava clans.

Information
- Gender: Male
- Occupation: Advisor; Charioteer
- Home: Hastinapura

Sanjaya (Sanskrit: सञ्जय, meaning "victory") or Sanjaya Gavalgana is a figure from the ancient Indian epic Mahābhārata. Sanjaya is the advisor of the blind king Dhritarashtra, the ruler of the Kuru kingdom and the father of the Kauravas, as well as serving as his charioteer. Sanjaya is a disciple of Sage Vyasa. He is stated to have the gift of divya drishti (divine vision), the ability to observe distant events within his mind, granted by Vyasa. He narrates to Dhritarashtra the events of the Kurukshetra War, including the ones described in the Bhagavad Gita.

== Role in the Mahabharata ==
=== As a messenger ===
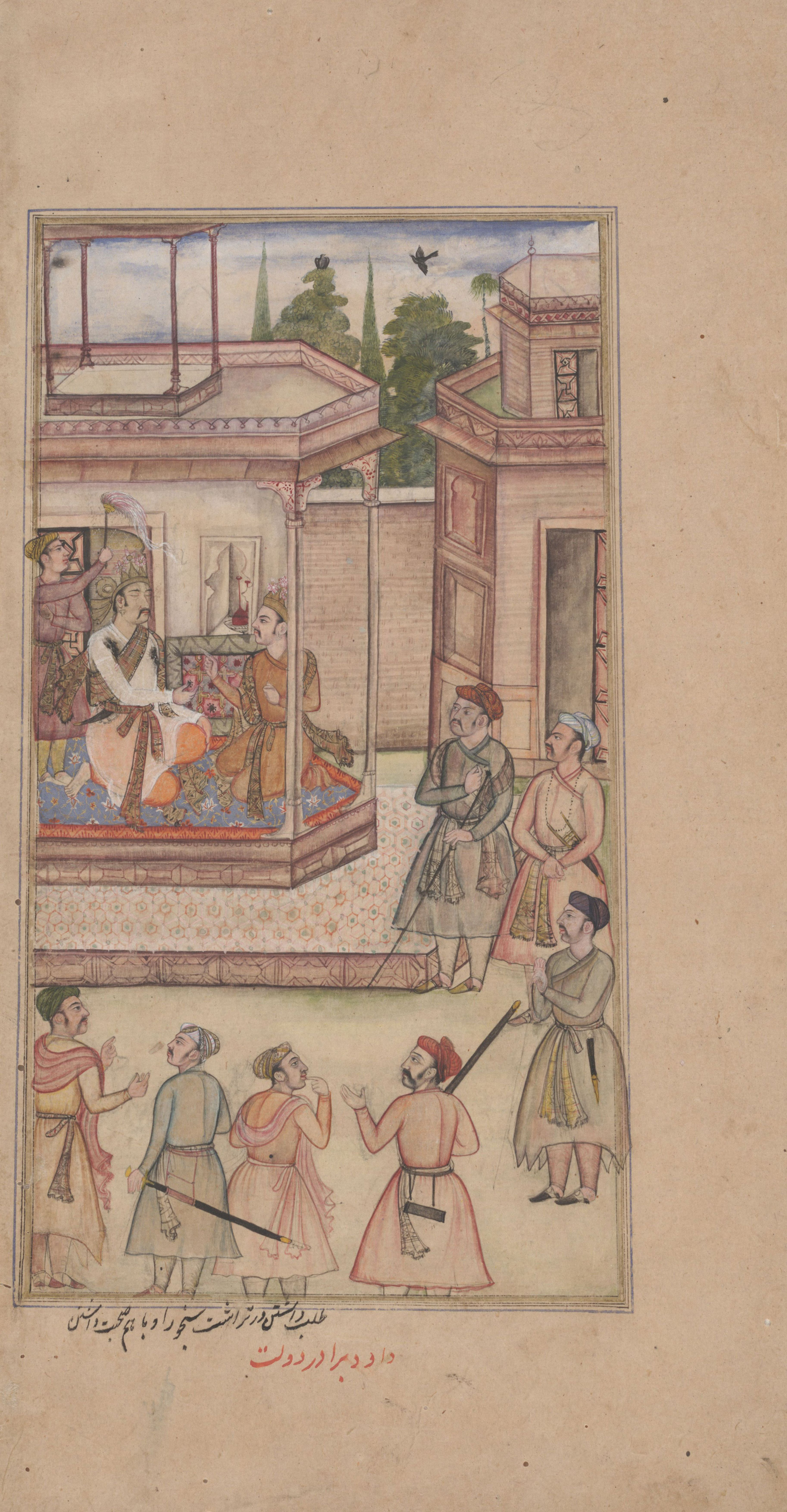
Dhritarashtra summons Sanjaya to become messenger of the Pandavas, Artist Daud, folio of Razmnama.

Before this great war broke out, Sanjaya had gone to Yudhishtira as the Ambassador of Kauravas to negotiate on behalf of them.

=== Gift of Divine Vision ===
Having a divine vision is completely different than just a subtle sight ("Sanjaya's Gift"). One who possesses a subtle sight sees image of things invisible in his mind, whereas in divine vision, instead of it being in the mind, it is like seeing it in person. Also, the sounds are heard with the physical ear and not as a current of thought.

=== As the describer of the Mahabharata war ===
While Sanjaya was still in Hastinapur, the series of events that happened on the battlefield of Kurukshetra was very clear to him ("Sanjaya's Gift"). He saw with his eyes as if he was on the battlefield. Sanjaya saw: partisans of Dhritarashtra and the Pandavas gathered there, heard with his ears the words of Duryodhana, the fierce battle-cry of grandfather Bhishma, the mighty sound of Panchajanya proclaiming the destruction of the Kurus, and the dialogue between Krishna and Arjuna bringing out the import of the Gita ("Sanjaya's Gift").

Sanjaya clearly has an advantage over an average person because he could hear things that would even frighten the average person. He was described to be gifted as he could see "events at a distance granted by the Rishi Vyasa" ("Sanjaya, Charioteer"). On the eve of the Mahabharata War, the Gita was spoken, "we find in the very first verse of the Gita, King Dhritarashtra seeking information about the War from Sanjaya who had received the gift of divine vision" ("Sanjaya's Gift").

As Dhritarashtra's advisor, Sanjaya's job was not as hard. Until he had to tell Dhritarashtra the news of the death of his "hundred sons at the hands of Bhima at different points of time in the battle and offers the sorrowing king solace in his darkest hours" ("Vyasa"). Sanjaya tells every incident of the Kurukshetra war. Sanjaya also gives various descriptions of: Earth, the other planets, and focuses on the Indian subcontinent and gives an elaborate list of hundreds of kingdoms, tribes, provinces, cities, towns, villages, rivers, mountains, and forests of the (ancient) Indian Subcontinent (Bharata Varsha).

He also explains about the military formations adopted by each side on each day, the death of each hero and the details of each war-racing ("Vyasa"). Sanjaya is known to be very frank in his narration of the battle events and his opinions and he also predicted the destruction of Kauravas at the hands of Krishna and Arjuna ("Sanjaya, Charioteer"). Sanjaya was Dhritarashtra's honest advisor.

== Symbolism ==
Sanjaya is a virtuous character who "represents intuitive knowledge, which arises from long and arduous spiritual practice, a predominance of sattva and inner awakening" (V, "Symbolism in the Bhagavadgita"). Despite him not being as lucky as Arjuna to earn the divine grace, he is still able to receive knowledge from Lord Krishna because he mastered having control over his body and mind (V, "Symbolism in the Bhagavadgita"). He represents having a sense of awareness as he is able to witness all of the details occurring in the battle. Sanjaya was able to spot when "Arjuna dropped his bow and arrows, and sat down on the seat of the chariot, with his mind overwhelmed with sorrow" (Sharma 11). Seeing Arjuna past his physical appearance as being exhausted from the battle, Sanjaya displays his mastery in the mind and body as he was able to see Arjuna as sorrowful.
