= Timeline of Bihar =

Bihar is a state located in the eastern part of India.

== Iron Age (1500–200 BC) ==
=== Late Vedic Period ===
- 1700 BCE: King Brihadratha establishes the first ruling dynasty of Magadha.
- 1100–600 BCE: The republics of Videha, Magadha and Anga ruled modern-day Bihar in the north, south-west and south-east respectively.
- 8th century BCE: Sita, the daughter of one of king Janak of Mithila is mentioned as the consort of Lord Rama in the Hindu epic Ramayana.
- 6th century BCE: Foundation and rule of Vajji, a confederation of various republican clans in the Mithila region with a capital at Vaishali. The Lichhavis were the most powerful clan among them.

=== Rise of Magadha ===
- 540 BCE: Magadha under the of Haryanka dynasty annexed Anga.
- 537 BCE: Siddhartha Gautama attained the state of enlightenment in Bodh Gaya. Mahavira born in Kundalpur around the same time. Buddhism and Jainism are given patronage by Magadha rulers.
- 492 BCE: Ajatashatru secured the throne of Magadha by executing his father Bimbisara.
- 490 BCE: Establishment of Pataliputra.
- 484–468 BCE: Magadha-Vajji war won by Magadha thus unifying modern-day Bihar.
- Around 460 BCE: Magadha annexed its neighbour Kosala and established itself as a great power in North India. By this time they had an effective system of administration and government, a powerful army and a flourishing trade network.
- 413 BCE: Shishunaga successfully rebels against Nagadashaka of the Haryanka dynasty and ascends to the throne.
- 400 BCE: Shishunaga defeated the Pradyota dynasty of Avanti, removing a major rival of Magadh.
- 345 BCE: Mahapadma Nanda usurped the throne and then established Nanda dynasty.
- 345–322 BCE: The Nanda kings made administrative reforms, centralized much of the power and introduced a new currency. They also maintained a formidable army why they used to aggressively expand the empire, eventually conquering most of Mahajahpads and achieving total supremacy in Ganges Basin. Even the army of Alexander the Great mutinied at the prospect of facing this giant army.

=== Mauryan Empire ===
- 322–297 BCE: Chandragupta Maurya with the help of Chanakya overthrew Nanda dynasty and established Maurya dynasty. He then expanded Magadha and conquered all of North-India, much of South-India, modern-day Pakistan and Afghanistan with Pataliputra the capital of Magadha. During this time India's share is estimated to have been from 32% to 35% of the world economy which was the largest ever in its entire history. This era is often referred to as a golden age.
- 304 BCE: Ashoka born in Pataliputra.
- 273 BCE: Ashoka crowned emperor of Magadha.
- 261 BCE: Ashoka defeats Kalinga, the last major power in the subcontinent and converts to Buddhism.
- 232 BCE: Death of Ashoka and the beginning of Mauryan decline.

== Middle Kingdoms (200 BC – 1200 AD) ==
- 185–80 BCE: Shunga dynasty established by Magadh general Pushyamitra Shunga.
- 75–26 BCE: Kanva dynasty
- Around 6th century-11th century: The rule of Pala and Sena dynasties in Mithila region.
- 600–650: The empire of Harsha Vardhana expands into Magadh.
- 750–1200: The Pala dynasty expands into Magadh.
- 11th century – around 1325: The Karnat dynasty rules the Mithila region.

== Medieval Period (1200–1750) ==
- 1200: Bakhtiyar Khilji's army destroys the World's first universities at Nalanda and Vikramshila. Start of Afghan-Muslim rule in the Magadh region.
- 1200–1400: Sharp decline of Buddhism in Bihar and northern India in general
- 1250–1526: Magadh (c. 1250) and Mithila (c. 1325) regions come under the rule of the Delhi Sultanate.
- 1526–1540: Mughal Emperor Babur defeats the last Sultan of the Delhi Sultanate, Lodi, and establishes the Mughal Empire.
- 1540–1555: Sher Shah captures empire from Mughals.
- 1540–1555: Building of the Grand Trunk Road, introduction of the rupee and of custom duties.
- 1556–1764: The province of Bihar is formed and governed by the Mughal Empire.
- 1666: Guru Gobind Singh, the tenth and last Sikh Guru, is born in modern-day Patna.

== Colonial Period (1750 – 1947) ==
=== British East India Company ===
- 1757–1857: The British East India Company expands its rule into Bihar from Bengal.
- 1764: Battle of Buxar: Tax collection becomes the duty of the East India Company.
- 1764–1920 Migration of Bihari & United Provinces workers across the British world by the Company and later British government.
- 1857: Period of the Indian Rebellion of 1857. East India Company Sepoys from the Bengal Army (80% Hindu according to William Daryample in the book "The Last Mughal") declare Bahadur Shah Zafar II Emperor of Hindustan. The region becomes the centre of resistance to the East India Company. End of the Muslim Era.

=== The British Raj ===
- 1858: Mughal Sultanate-e-Hind reorganised to form the new British Indian Empire after the British Government abolishes the East India Company.
- 1877: House of Windsor is made the new Imperial Royal Family. Queen Victoria declared the first Emperess of the British Indian Empire
- 1900: Maghfoor Ahmad Ajazi, the veteran Indian Independence movement activist, is born in Muzaffarpur.
- 1912: Province of Bihar and Orissa separated from Bengal.
- 1913: Start of the dramatic slowdown in wealth creation in India and Bihar
- 1916: Patna High Court founded
- 1917: Mahatma Gandhi arrives in Champaran with a team of eminent lawyers: Brajkishore Prasad, Rajendra Prasad, Shri Krishna Sinha, Anugrah Narayan Sinha and others. The Champaran Satyagraha movement is launched.Establishment of Patna University.
- 1925: Patna Medical College Hospital was established under the name "Prince of Wales Medical College"
- 1935: 1935 Government of India Act federates the Indian Empire.
- 1936: Sir James David Sifton appointed the first Governor of Bihar.
- 1937: First Democratic election of Bihar in March 1937.Congress emerged as the largest political party, Muslim Independent Party headed by Barrister Muhammad Yunus stood second. Barrister Mohammad Yunus formed Government and became first Premier (April- July, 1937) of Bihar province.
- 1937:The first Congress ministry is formed in Bihar under provincial autonomy granted by British rule, Dr.Sri Krishna Sinha sworn in as Premier and Dr.Anugrah Narayan Sinha became Deputy Premier cum Finance Minister. Other two ministers inducted were Syed Mehmud and Jaglal Chaudhry.
- 1940: The All India Jamhur Muslim League was formed by Maghfoor Ahmad Ajazi to counter the Lahore resolution, passed by the All-India Muslim League, for a separate Pakistan based on Muhammad Ali Jinnah's Two nation theory. The first session of the party was held at Muzaffarpur in Bihar.
- 1942: Launch of Quit India Movement.Prominent Bihar leaders like Rajendra Prasad, Anugrah Narayan Sinha & Sri Krishna Sinha imprisoned.

== Post Independence (1947 – 1990) ==
- 1946: First Cabinet of Bihar formed; consisting of two members, Sri Krishna Sinha as first Chief Minister of Bihar and Dr. Anugrah Narayan Sinha as Bihar's first Deputy Chief Minister cum Finance Minister (also in charge of Labour, Health, Agriculture and Irrigation). Other ministers are inducted later. The cabinet served as the first Bihar government after independence in 1947.
- 1947: Indian Independence; Bihar becomes a state in the new Dominion of India.
- 1947-1949: Hindu-Muslim religious violence leads to the migration of millions of Bihari Muslims to Pakistan (West and East)
- 1952: Indian Government adopts symbols related to Bihar (Ashoka Chakra for the Indian flag, the Lion Pillar is made the symbol of the central government of India, all state governments, reserve bank, and the military, whilst the rupee, introduced in the area which is part of modern-day Bihar, is retained as the currency)
- 1950: Dr. Rajendra Prasad is appointed first President of India.
- 1952: State government initiates many irrigation and industrial development projects. It included several river valley projects right from Koshi, Aghaur and Sakri to several other such river projects.
- 1952-57: Purulia became a part of West Bengal state.Bihar rated as the best administered among the states in the country.
- 1955: The Birla Institute of Technology(BIT) is established at Mesra, Ranchi.
- 1957–62: Second five-year plan period, Bihar government brought several heavy industries like Barauni Oil Refinery, HEC plant at Hatia, Bokaro Steel Plant, Barauni Fertiliser Plant, Barauni Thermal Power Station, Maithon Hydel Power Station, Sulphur mines at Amjhaur, Sindri Fertiliser Plant, Kargali Coal Washery, Barauni Dairy Project, etc. for the all round development of the state.
- 1974–1977: Suspension of the Republican Constitution. Immediately after proclamation of emergency, prominent opposition political leaders from Bihar like Jayaprakash Narayan & Satyendra Narayan Sinha were arrested without any prior notice. Bihar is the centre of resistance against the Emergency.
- 1977: Janata Party Came to power at Centre and in Bihar;Karpoori Thakur became CM after winning chief ministership battle from the then Janata Party President Satyendra Narayan Sinha.
- 1984: Indira Gandhi Assassination leads to deadly anti-Sikh Riots in northern India, including Bihar.
- 1985: Pandit Bindeshwari Dubey sworn in as Bihar Chief Minister after Congress's victory in assembly elections. Kanti thermal power station started operations as the second thermal power plant in Bihar, after Barauni Thermal Power Station, with the help of efforts by the then MP of Muzaffarpur, George Fernandes.
- 1988–1990: Removal of Bihar CM Bhagwat Jha Azad, Veteran Leader S N Sinha sworn in as Chief Minister of Bihar, Lalu Prasad Yadav appointed Leader Of Opposition.

== Modern Period (1990–present) ==
=== Lalu–Rabri Yadav (1990–2005) ===
- 1990: Janata Dal wins the Bihar election, Lalu Prasad becomes Bihar Chief Minister (CM), defeating former Janata Party CM Ram Sundar Das.
- 1990–2005: Social justice
- 1995: Janata Dal's second electoral victory.
- 1995–2000: Economic stagnation, state GDP contracts.
- 1996: Lalu Prasad appoints wife, Rabri Devi, as CM.
- 1997: Split in Janata Dal, Nitish Kumar and Ram Vilas Paswan create Janata Dal (United).
- 1999: Presidential rule imposed in Bihar because of complete denigration of governance, then lifted because not endorsed by the Rajya Sabha, Rabri Devi back as CM.
- 2000: Bihar divided into two states, Bihar and Jharkhand, by the National Democratic Alliance central government.
- 2000: Lalu Prasad's split Janata Dal wins elections.
- 2000: Nitish Kumar becomes Bihar CM for seven days, then resigns after his government fails to garner majority. Janata Dal back in power.
- 2002–2004: Deadly crime wave grips Patna and Bihar.
- 2003: Maharashtra railways exams attacks, Assam ethnic conflict.

=== Nitish Kumar (post 1997) ===
- 2005: In February Lalu Prasad Yadav and Rabri Devi lose power after 15 years
- 2005: In November, Janata Dal (United) and the BJP win the state election.
- 2005–2007: Nitish Kumar is declared the best Chief Minister in India by India Today magazine
- 2007: Bhojpuri cinema hall complex bombed in Punjab. Six UP and Bihari migrant workers killed.
- 2008: Second Bihari-Bhojpuri Immigrant Worker Crisis: Migrants and students attacked in Maharashtra, Assam, Manipur, and Nagaland. Economic revival Q1 2008, resulting in labour shortages in Punjab, Maharashtra.
- 2008: Floods in Mithla region kill 3,000 people, displace millions.
- 2010: Nitish Kumar again becomes Bihar CM after a historic mandate.
- 2014: Nitish Kumar resigns after the historic debacle in 2014 Lok Sabha elections; Jitan Ram Manjhi is new CM
- 20 November 2015 – Nitish Kumar sworn in as Bihar CM for the fourth time after resignation of incumbent Jitan Ram Manjhi
- 26 July 2017 – Nitish Kumar becomes CM of Bihar for the record fifth time after spectacular victory of Grand Alliance coalition, Former CM Lalu Prasad Yadav's younger son Tejashwi Yadav, a debutant MLA, is sworn in as the fourth Deputy Chief Minister of Bihar, becoming the youngest person to hold the post, while the elder son of Lalu Prasad Yadav, Tej Pratap becomes Health Minister of Bihar.
