= List of wars involving Magadha =

This is a list of wars involving the political entities based in the Magadha region of India.

== Ancient Magadha ==
Conflict	Magadha and Allies	Opponent(s)	Outcome
Magadha–Anga war (540–535 BCE)	Haryanka dynasty	Anga	Victory :Magadha annexation of Anga.
First Magadha–Avanti War (544–413 BCE)	Haryanka dynasty	Avanti	Defeat: Magadha failed to annex Avanti.
Magadha–Kosala War (Late 5th century BCE)	Haryanka dynasty	Kosala	Victory: Magadha annexation of Kosala.
Magadha–Vajji war (484–468 BCE)	Haryanka dynasty	Vajjika League	Victory: Magadha annexation of Vajjika Republic.
Second Magadha–Avanti War (413–400 BCE)	Shishunaga dynasty	Avanti	Victory: Magadha annexation of Avanti.
Nanda's conquest of Northern India (c.345 - 321 BCE)	Nanda dynasty	North Indian states	Victory
Overthrow of the Nanda dynasty (c. 323–321 BCE)	Nanda dynasty	Chandragupta Maurya	Defeat: Establishment of the Mauryan Empire over annexed Nanda territories.
Chandragupta's conquest of North-western India (c. Early 3rd century BCE)	Maurya dynasty	Greek satrapies	Victory: All remaining Macedon satrapies defeated.
Chandragupta's Conquests of Deccan (c. Early 3rd century BCE)	Maurya dynasty	Deccan states	Victory: Chandragupta's reign extended over most of the subcontinent.
Seleucid–Mauryan War (305–303 BCE)	Maurya dynasty	Seleucid Empire	Victory: Treaty of the Indus; Seleucid Empire's eastern satrapies such as Aria, Arachosia, Gedrosia and Paropamisadae ceded to the Maurya Empire.
First Takshashila Revolt (c. Late 3rd century BCE)	Maurya dynasty	Rebels	Victory: Prince Ashoka stops the revolt.
Second Takshashila Revolt (c. Late 3rd century BCE)	Maurya dynasty	Rebels	Defeat: Prince Shushima fails to stop the revolt.
Kalinga War (c. 262–261 BCE)	Maurya dynasty	Kalinga	Victory: Kalinga annexed by Mauryan dynasty.
Mauryan Reconquest (c. Early 2nd century BCE)	Maurya dynasty	Breakaway Deccan states & Kalinga	Victory: Imperial soldiers disguised as Jain monks reconquer breakaway territories.
Shunga–Greek War (c. Late 2nd century BCE): Demetrius I's invasion of India	Shunga dynasty	Greco-Bactrian Kingdom & Indo-Greek Kingdom	Victory: Shungas managed to resist the invasion.
Shunga–Vidarbha War (c. Mid 1st century BCE)	Shunga dynasty	Vidarbha	Victory: Vidarbha recognized the suzerainty of the Shunga rulers.
Kanva–Satavahana War (28 BCE)	Kanva dynasty	Satavahana dynasty	Defeat

== Classical Magadha ==
In the classical age of India, Magadha was ruled by the Gupta Empire and then the Later Gupta dynasty.

Conflict	Allies	Opponent(s)	Outcome
Samudragupta's first North Indian campaign (c. 4th century CE)	Gupta Empire	3 kings of Aryavarta	Gupta Victory
Samudragupta's second North Indian campaign (c. 4th century CE)	Gupta Empire	8 kings of Aryavarta	Gupta Victory
Samudragupta's South Indian campaign (c. 4th century CE)	Gupta Empire	12 kings of Dakshinapatha	Gupta Victory
Gupta–Saka Wars (c. 375 to 413 CE)	Gupta Empire	Western Satraps	Gupta Victory
Chandragupta II's conquest Balkh (Punjab and Afghanistan) (c. 4th century to 5th century CE)	Gupta Empire	Balkh states	Gupta victory
Kumaragupta I's conquest of South-western India (c. 5th century CE)	Gupta Empire	Traikutaka dynasty	Gupta Victory
Battle of Sondani (528 CE)	Alchon Huns	Aulikaras; Gupta Empire	Gupta and Aulikara victory
Gauda–Gupta War (528 CE)	Gauda Kingdom	Gupta Empire: Later Gupta dynasty; Maukhari dynasty	Gupta and Maukhari victory
