= Avanti–Magadhan War =

Series of wars in Ancient India

Avanti-Magadhī War
| Date | 544–400 BCE |
| Location | North India |
| Result | Magadhī victory and hegemony in North India |
| Territorial changes | Magadhī annexation of Avanti |

Belligerents
| Magadha: Haryanka Dynasty (544–413); Shishunaga dynasty (413–400) | Avanti |

Commanders and leaders
| Bimbisara; Ajatashatru; Udayin; Anuruddha; Munda; Nagadasaka; Shishunaga | Palaka; Visakhayupa; Ajaka; Varttivarddhana or Nandivardhana |

Strength
| Unknown | Unknown |

Casualties and losses
| Unknown | Unknown |

The Avanti-Magadhan war was fought between Magadha and Avanti for domination over much of North India.

The ancient Indian states were almost always in conflict with one another. During the reign of King Bimbisara of the Haryanka dynasty of Magadha pursued an expansionist policy. This caused him to come into conflict with the Pradyota dynasty of Avanti. Bimbisara had to fortify Rajgir due to the threat of an Avanti invasion. During the early years of the reign of Ajatashatru, Avanti managed to establish its supremacy by invading certain parts of Magadhan territories.

== Shishunaga: Conquest of Avanti ==
After the death of Ajatashatru a period of uncertainty followed and a succession of weak rulers again gave rise to a threat of a Pradyota invasion. Enraged by this, the people of Magadha overthrew the last of the Haryanka rulers and one of the ministers, Shishunaga, usurped the throne. Shishunaga defeated the Pradyota dynasty of Avanti, removing a major threat to the Magadhan Empire.

== See also ==
- Magadha-Vajji war
