= Shishunaga =

Founder of Shaishunaga dynasty (ruled c. 413 – 395 BCE)

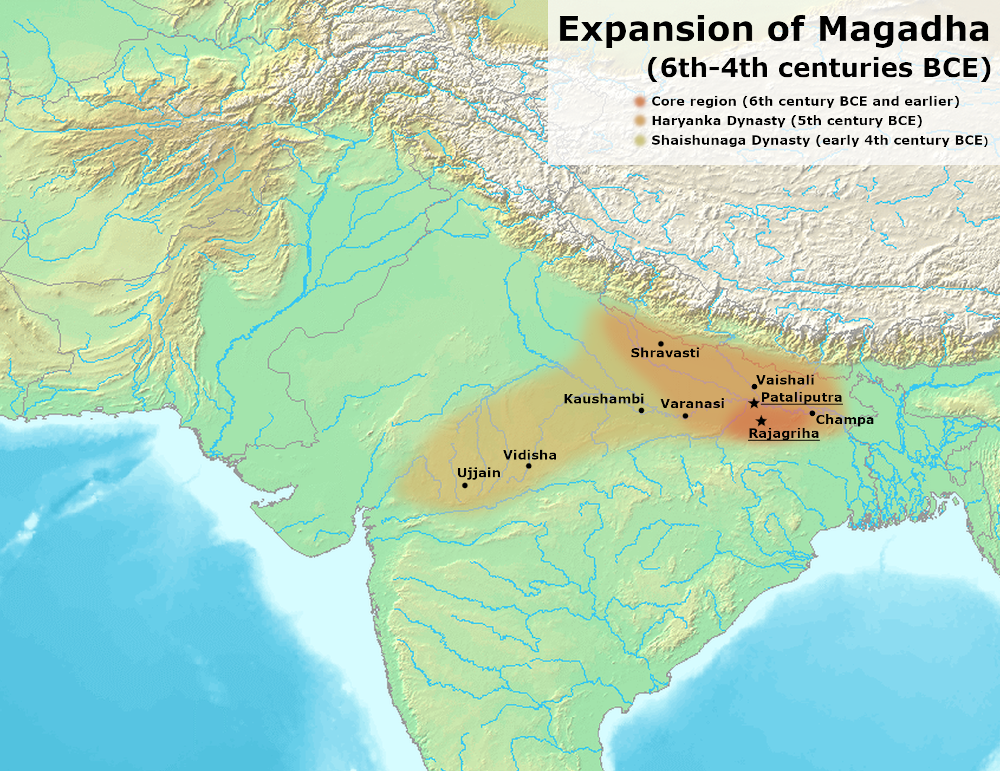

King of Magadha
- Reign: c. 413 – c. 395 BCE
- Predecessor: Nāgadāsaka (of Haryanka dynasty)
- Successor: Kalashoka (Kakavarna)
- Issue: Kalashoka
- Dynasty: Shishunaga

Shishunaga (IAST: Śiśunāga, or Shusunaga) (c. 413 – 395 BCE) was the founder of the Shaishunaga dynasty of the Magadha Empire in the present-day northern India. Initially, he was an amatya (official) of the Magadha empire under the Haryanka dynasty. He was placed on the throne by the people who revolted against the Haryanka dynasty rule. According to the Puranas, he placed his son at Varanasi and himself ruled from Girivraja (Rajagriha). He was succeeded by his son Kalashoka (Kakavarna).

== Early life ==
According to the Mahavamsatika, Shishunaga was a son of a Licchavi ruler of Vaishali. He was conceived by a nagara-shobhini and brought up an officer of state. At the time of the revolt, he was a viceroy at Varanasi of king Nagadasaka, the last ruler of the Haryanka dynasty.

== Reign ==
Shishunaga ruled from 413 BCE to 395 BCE. Initially, his capital was Rajagriha while Vaishali was his second royal residence. Later he shifted his capital to Vaishali. He conquered Avanti kingdom by defeating Nandivardhana or Avantivardhana, the last king of Pradyota dynasty. The Magadhan victory must have been helped by the revolution that placed Aryaka on the throne of Ujjayini.

The Puranas tell us that he placed his son at Varanasi while he himself ruled from Girivraja (Rajagriha).

== Expansion ==
He destroyed Pradyota dynasty of Avanti and conquered kingdoms of Kosala and Vatsa.

== Successor ==
He was succeeded by his son Kalashoka (Kakavarna).

== See also ==
- Avanti-Magadhan Wars
