= Nicakṣu =

First King of Vatsa kingdom

- Raja

King of Kuru
- Reign: 8th century BC
- Predecessor: Adhisimakrishna
- Successor: Position abolished

King of Vatsa
- Reign: 8th century BC
- Predecessor: Position established
- Successor: Ushņa
- House: Kuru
- Dynasty: Bharatas
- Father: Adhisimakrishna

Nicakṣu (8th century BC) was the last Kuru King of Hastinapura and first King of Vatsa kingdom. He was the descendant of Janamejaya and the ancestor of Udayana of Vatsa.

== Historicity ==
During the excavation of Hastinapur (1950s), archeologists came across layer of Period-II (1100B.C. - 800B.C.) from were they found Early Painted Grey Ware ceramics. Archeologist B. B. Lal noted that this Period of occupation ended with a great flood in the river, which washed away a considerable portion of the settlement, as indicated by the erosional scar on the mound. The Puranic texts also confirm the great flood which washed away Hastinapur during the reign of Nicakṣu. In the excavation of Kosambi (1957-59) led by G. R. Sharma they found pottery belonging to the Painted Grey Ware. When these artifacts were compared to artifacts found at typical Painted Grey Ware sites such as Hastinapur, it was shown that Kosambi represents a late stage in the history of this ware. As Udayana, the King of Vatsa and the descendent of Nicakṣu, was a contemporary to Buddha and according to archeological proof of flood, archeologist B. B. Lal assigns the reign of Nicakṣu to around 875 BCE.

== Reign ==
He succeeded his father King Adhisimakrishna. The Puranas state that after the washing away of Hastinapura by the Ganges, the Bhārata king Nicakṣu, the great-great-grandson of Janamejaya, abandoned the city and settled in Kauśāmbī starting Vatsa branch of Kuru clan. This is supported by the Svapnavāsavadattā and the Pratijñā-Yaugandharāyaṇa attributed to Bhāsa. He was succeeded by Ushņa.

== See also ==
- Kuru kingdom
  - Hastinapur
    - Janamejaya
    - Parikshit
- Painted Grey Ware culture
- Vatsa
  - Kosambi
    - Udayana (king)
