= Avanti (region) =

Historical country in India

Kingdom of Avanti Avantī-deśa
- c. 700 BCE–c. 300 BCE
- Avanti and other Mahajanapadas in the post-Vedic period of the subcontinent.
- Capital: Ujjayini
- Common languages: Sanskrit, Prakrit
- Religion: Historical Vedic religion Jainism; Buddhism
- Government: Monarchy
- Historical era: Bronze Age, Iron Age
  - Established: c. 700 BCE
  - Disestablished: c. 300 BCE
Succeeded by
Malavas
- Today part of: India

Avanti was an ancient Indian Mahajanapada (Great Janapada), roughly corresponding to the present-day Malwa region. According to the Buddhist texts, the Anguttara Nikaya, Avanti was one of the solasa mahajanapadas (sixteen great realms) of the 6th century BCE. The janapada was divided into two parts by the Vindhyas, the northern part had its capital at Ujjayini and the southern part had its centre at Mahishmati.

The Avantis, the ancient people belonging to this realm, were described as mahavala (very powerful) in the Udyoga Parva (19.24) of the Mahabharata. According to the Vishnu Purana (II.3), the Bhagavata Purana (XII.I.36) and the Brahma Purana (XIX.17), the Avantis were associated with the Malava, the Saurashtras, the Abhiras/Yadavas, the Suras, the Karushas and the Arbudas and were described as dwelling along the Pariyatra (or Paripatra) mountains (a western branch of the Vindhyas).

== Location ==
The kingdom of Avanti covered a territory which included the region around the city of Ujjayini and the section of the Narmadā river valley between Māhissatī and Maheshwar, as well as some nearby areas.

Avanti was divided into a northern and a southern part by the Vindhya mountains, with the northern section, which had its capital at Ujjenī, being drained by the Sipra river as well as other streams, while the southern section was drained by the Narmadā and had its capital at Māhissatī or Māhiṣmatī.

== History ==
=== The Haihayas of Mahishmati ===
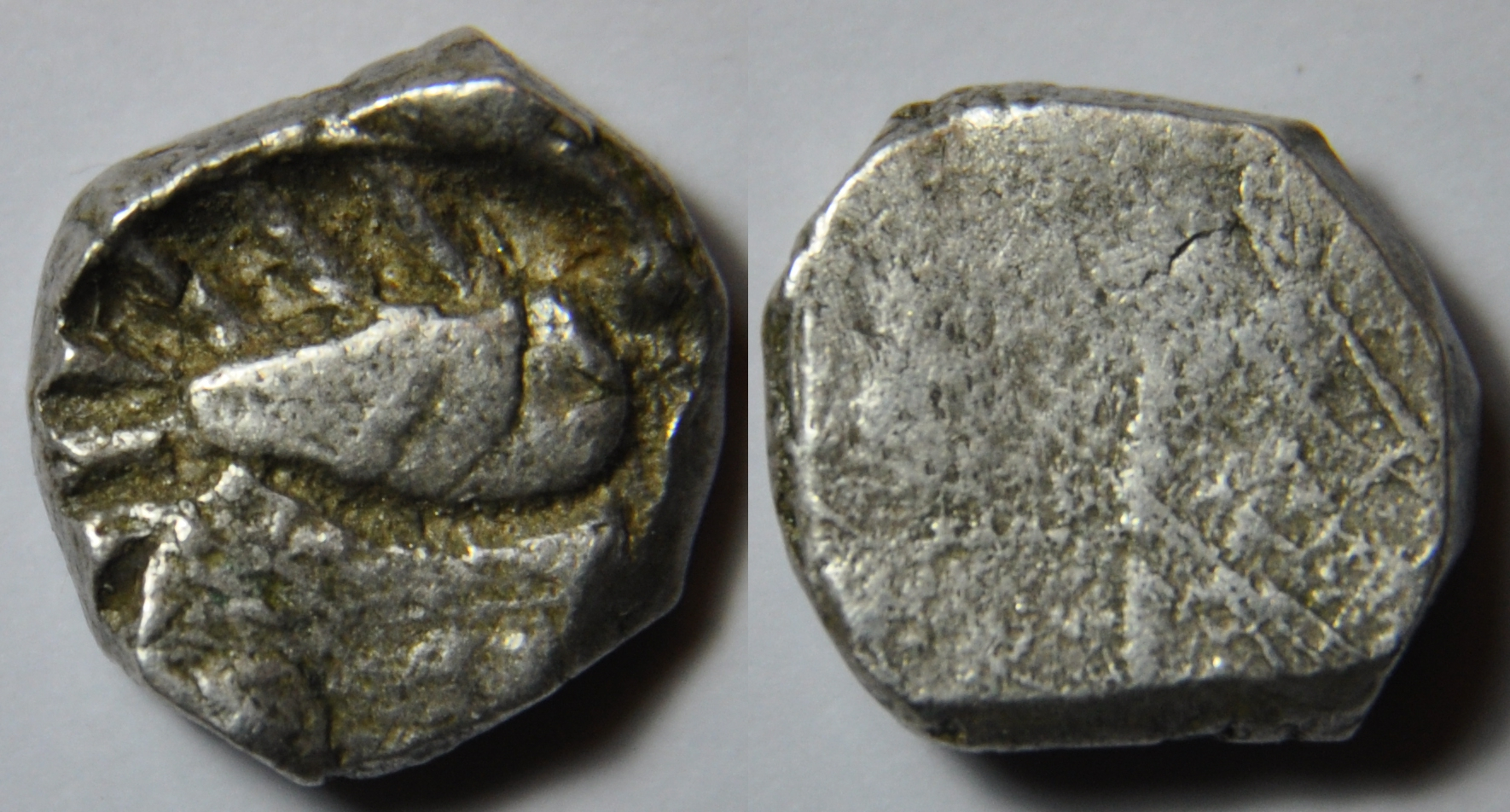
A silver coin of ½ karshapana from the kingdom of Avanti about 400-312 BC. Obv: Fish. Rev: empty. Dimensions: 10 x 9.32 mm. Weight: 1.7 g.

According to the Puranic accounts, the Haihayas were the earliest rulers of Avanti, who captured the region from the Nagas. Initially, they ruled from Mahishmati. Some accounts place Ujjayini as the capital of Avanti. Later, the whole janapada was divided into two parts with the capitals at Mahishmati and Ujjayini. The Haihayas were a confederation of five clans, the Vitihotras, the Bhojas, the Avantis, the Tundikeras and the Sharyatas. Later, the Haihayas were better known by their dominant clan - the Vitihotras. Ripunjaya, the last Vitihotra ruler of Ujjayini was overthrown by his amatya (minister) Pulika, who placed his son, Pradyota on the throne.

The Mahagovindasuttanta of the Dighanikaya mentions an Avanti king Vessabhu (Vishvabhu) and his capital Mahissati (Mahishmati). Probably he was a Vitihotra ruler.

=== Pradyota dynasty ===
Pradyota was contemporary to Gautama Buddha. He was also known as Chandapradyota Mahasena. Pradyota captured the Vatsa king Udayana but later he married his daughter Vasavadatta to Udayana. The Mahavagga described him as cruel and according to the Majjhima Nikaya, Ajātasattu, the king of Magadha fortified Rajagriha to protect it from an invasion led by Pradyota. He also waged war on Pushkarasarin, king of Takshashila Pradyota's chief queen Gopalamata (mother of prince Gopala) was a disciple of Buddhist monk Mahakatyayana and constructed a stupa in Ujjayini.

Pradyota had two sons, Gopala and Palaka. He was succeeded by Palaka. According to Jaina accounts Palaka ascended to the throne on the day of passing away of Mahavira. According to the Kathasaritsagara and the Avashyaka Kathanaka, the kingdom of Vatsa was already a part of Avanti during the reign of Palaka and a prince of the royal family was the governor of Kaushambi. In the Mricchakatika, Palaka was described as a tyrant who was overthrown by a popular revolt. This revolt placed Aryaka on the throne of Ujjayini. The Puranas place Nadivardhana or Vartivardhana after Aryaka. But these names are probably corruptions of Avantivardhana, the name of the son of Palaka according to the Kathasaritsagara or the son of Gopala according to the Nepali Brihatkatha. He was defeated by Shishunaga, the king of Magadha.

=== Avanti under Magadhan rule ===
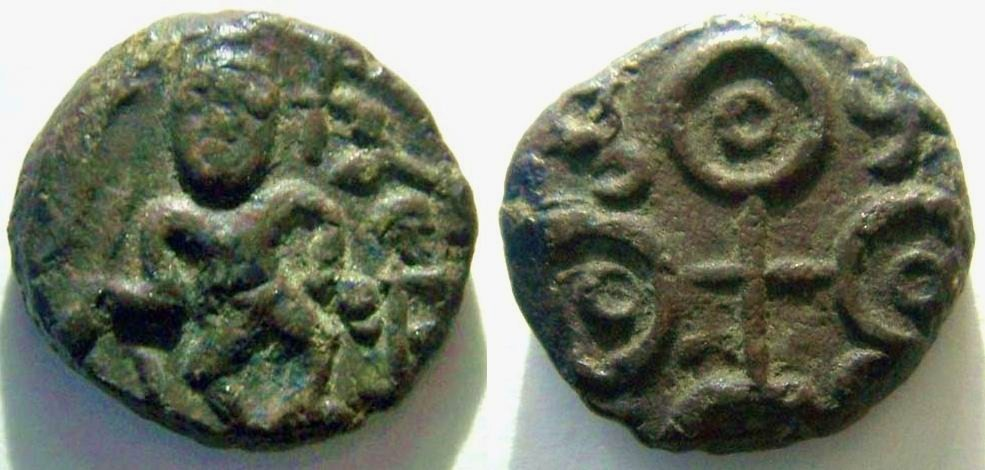
A copper uninscribed coin of Ujjayini

Avanti was a part of the Magadha empire during the rule of the Shaishunaga and the Nanda dynasties. During the Nanda Empire rule, Avanti became the Avantirāṭṭha or the western province of the empire, with its capital at Ujjayini. The Junagarh Rock inscription of Rudradaman I (150 CE) mentions Pushyagupta as the governor of the western province during the reign of Chandragupta Maurya. During the reign of the next ruler Bindusara, prince Ashoka was the provincial governor. After the fall of the Mauryas, at the time of Pushyamitra Shunga, his son Agnimitra was the Magadhan viceroy at Vidisha, but he ruled independent of Magadha for all practical purposes.

=== Malava Kingdom ===
The Malava kingdom is one of the many kingdoms ruled by the Yadava kings in the central and western India Malwa region that are mentioned in the Mahabharata. Sometimes, Avanti and Malava were described to be the same country. They were originally a western tribe, located in the Punjab region of North-west India. Later, they migrated to the Rajasthan and Madhya Pradesh states of India. In the recorded history of India, there was a royal tribe called Malavas that were believed to be the descendants of the Malavas.

== See also ==
- Janapada
- Mahajanapadas
- History of India
- Avanti–Magadhan War
- History of Hinduism
- List of Indian monarchs
- List of Hindu empires and dynasties
