= Mahanandin =

Shishunaga emperor from 355 to 345 BCE

King of Magadha
- Reign: c. 355 - 345 BCE
- Predecessor: Nandivardhana
- Successor: Mahapadma Nanda
- Died: 345 BCE
- Issue: possibly Mahapadma Nanda and several others
- Father: Nandivardhana

Mahanandin was the last king of the Shishunaga dynasty of the Indian subcontinent. The dynasty ruled parts of ancient India around the city of Pataliputra (present day Patna, Bihar).

== Life ==
Puranas list Nandivardhana as the ninth son of kalashoka he was succeeded by his son Mahanandin,the last Shishunaga king. Mahanandin was killed by his illegitimate son from a Shudra wife named Mahapadma Nanda.
