= Nanda Empire =

Ruling dynasty of Magadha (c. 345–322 BCE)

Nanda dynasty
- c. 345 BCE (Note: variously dated from 5th century BCE or mid-4th century BCE)–c. 322 BCE
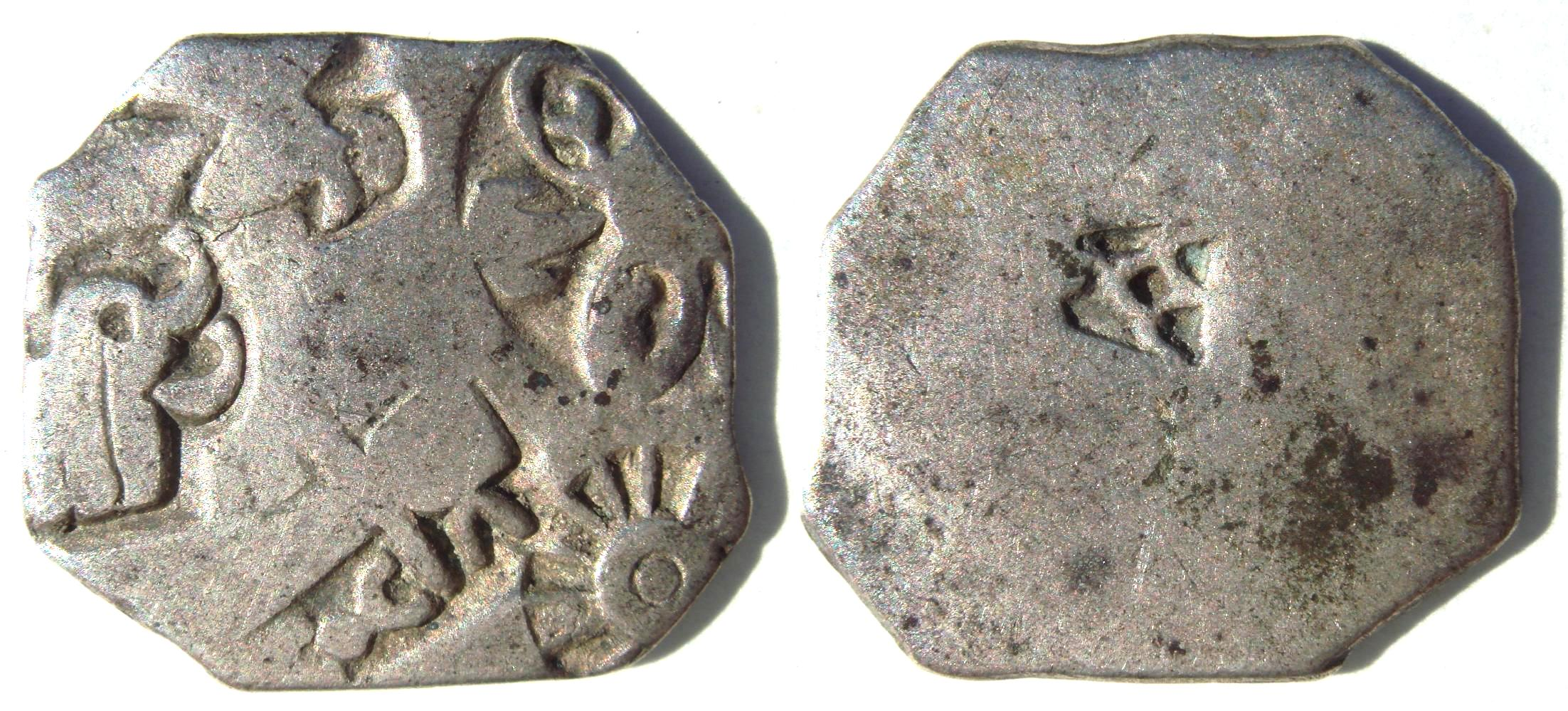
- Punch-marked coinage of the Nanda Empire

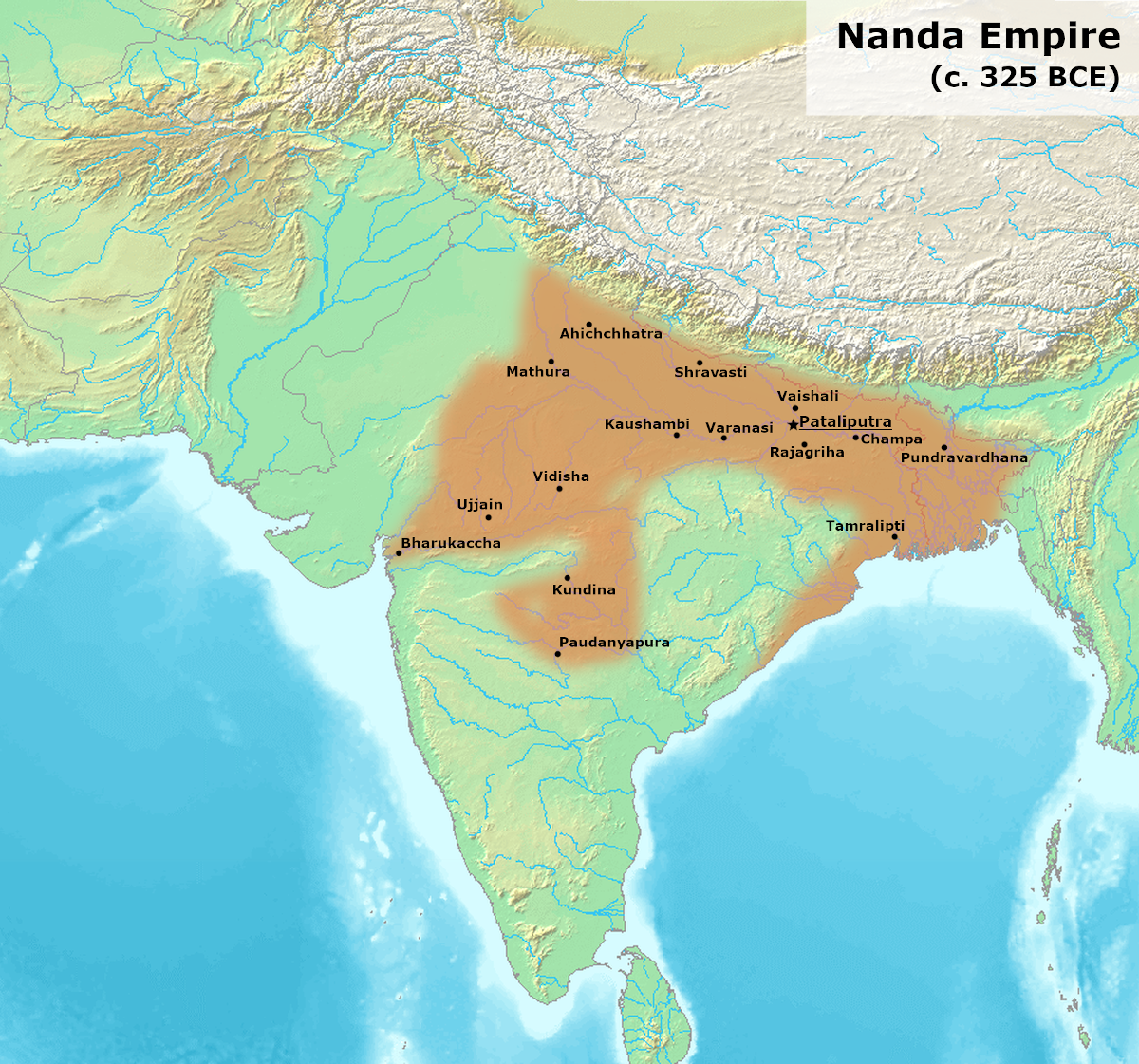
- Possible extent of the Nanda Empire under its last ruler Dhana Nanda (c. 325 BCE).
- Status: Empire
- Capital: Pataliputra
- Religion: Jainism; Ajivikism; Buddhism; Hinduism; Historical Vedic religion
- Government: Monarchy
- King
  - c. 345 – c. 340 BCE: Mahapadma (first)
  - c. 329 – c. 322 BCE: Dhana (last)
- Historical era: Iron Age India
  - Established: c. 345 BCE (Note: variously dated from 5th century BCE or mid-4th century BCE)
  - Disestablished: c. 322 BCE
Preceded by
Shaishunaga dynasty
Mithila
Panchala
Surasena
Vatsa
Kuru
Haihaya
Vanga
Asmaka
Succeeded by
Maurya Empire
- Today part of: India; Bangladesh; Nepal

The Nanda Empire was a vast empire that governed in Magadha and Gangetic plains with an enormous geographical reach in 4th-century BCE northeastern India, with some accounts suggesting existence as far back as the 5th century BCE. The Nandas built on the successes of their Haryanka and Shaishunaga predecessors and installed a more centralised administration. Ancient sources credit them with amassing great wealth, which was probably the result of the introduction of a new currency and taxation system.

Ancient texts also suggest that the Nandas were unpopular among their subjects because of their low-status birth, excessive taxation, and general misconduct. The last Nanda king Dhana Nanda was overthrown by Chandragupta Maurya, founder of the Maurya Empire.

Modern historians generally identify the ruler of the Gangaridai and the Prasii mentioned in ancient Greco-Roman accounts as a Nanda king. While describing Alexander the Great's invasion of Punjab (327–325 BCE), Greco-Roman writers depict this kingdom as a great military power. The prospect of a war against this kingdom, which according to Greek sources had an army five times the size of the Macedonian army, coupled with the exhaustion resulting from almost a decade of campaigning, led to a mutiny among Alexander's homesick soldiers, putting an end to his Indian campaign.

== Origins ==
=== Homeland ===
The Nanda Empire became a significant ruling authority in Magadha, prior to the creation of the Maurya Empire who established a large empire in the Ganga valley. In the Buddhist accounts, the Nandas ascended the throne by open conquest in the field and not through secret intrigues or assassinations.

Greek authors refer to a great kingdom to the east of the kingdom of King Porus, beyond the Jhelum River. The kingdom is referred to as belonging to the Gangaridae and Prasioi, and the capital at Palibothra, which is generally accepted as referring to Pataliputra. Prasioi is derived from the Sanskrit term Prachya, meaning "eastern", and Gangaridae is traced to the Gangetic Plain. These references suggest that the kingdom of Magadha extended dominion over the country to the east of the Jhelum, and its capital was at Pataliputra.

=== Ancestry ===
Both Indian and Greco-Roman traditions characterise the dynasty's founder as of low birth. According to Greek historian Diodorus (1st century BCE), Porus told Alexander that the contemporary Nanda king was thought to be the son of a barber. Roman historian Quintus Curtius Rufus (1st century CE) adds that according to Porus, this barber became the former queen's paramour thanks to his attractive looks, treacherously assassinated the then king, usurped the supreme authority by pretending to act as a guardian for the then princess, and later killed the princess.

The Jain tradition, as recorded in the Avashyaka Sutra and the 12th century text Parishishtaparvan, corroborates the Greco-Roman accounts, stating that the first Nanda king was the son of a barber. According to the 12th-century text Parishishtaparvan, the mother of the first Nanda king was a courtesan. However, the text also states that the daughter of the last Nanda king married Chandragupta, because it was customary for Kshatriya girls to choose their husbands; thus, it implies that the Nanda king claimed to be a Kshatriya, that is, a member of the warrior class.

The Puranas name the dynasty's founder as Mahapadma, and claim that he was the son of the Shaishunaga king Mahanandin. However, even these texts hint at the low birth of the Nandas, when they state that Mahapadma's mother belonged to the Shudra class, the lowest of the varnas.

Since the claim of the barber ancestry of the dynasty's founder is attested by two different traditions—Greco-Roman and Jain, it appears to be more reliable than the Puranic claim of Shaishunaga ancestry.

The Buddhist tradition calls the Nandas "of unknown lineage" (annata-kula). According to Mahavamsa, the dynasty's founder was Ugrasena, who was originally "a man of the frontier": he fell into the hands of a gang of robbers, and later became their leader. He later ousted the sons of the Shaishunaga king Kalashoka (or Kakavarna).

K. N. Panikkar suggested that the Nandas were the sole Kshatriyas in India "at the time of the Mauryas" and M. N. Srinivas suggested that the "other Kshatriya castes have come into existence through a process of caste mobility from among the lower castes".

== Regnal period ==
There is little unanimity among the ancient sources regarding the total duration of the Nanda reign or their regnal period. For example, the Matsya Purana assigns 88 years to the rule of the first Nanda king alone, while some manuscripts of the Vayu Purana state the total duration of the Nanda rule as 40 years. The 16th century Buddhist scholar Taranatha assigns 29 years to the Nandas.

It is difficult to assign precise dates for the Nanda and other early dynasties of Magadha. Historians Irfan Habib and Vivekanand Jha date the Nanda rule from c. 344–322 BCE, relying on the Sri Lankan Buddhist tradition which states that the Nandas ruled for 22 years. Historian Upinder Singh dates the Nanda rule from 364/345 BCE to 324 BCE, based on the assumption that Gautama Buddha died in c. 486 BCE.

According to another theory, based on astronomical calculations, the first Nanda king ascended the throne in 424 BCE. Proponents of this theory also interpret the Hathigumpha inscription to mean that "Nandaraja" (the Nanda king) flourished in year 103 of the Mahavira Era, that is, in 424 BCE.

The 14th century Jain writer Merutunga, in his Vichara-shreni, states that king Chandra Pradyota of Avanti died on the same night as the Jain leader Mahavira. He was succeeded by his son Palaka, who ruled for 60 years. After that, the Nandas rose to power at Pataliputra and captured the Avanti capital Ujjayini. The Nanda rule, spanning the reigns of nine kings, lasted for 155 years, after which the Mauryas came to power. According to the Śvetāmbara Jain tradition, Mahavira died in 527 BCE, which would mean that the Nanda rule—according to Merutunga's writings—lasted from 467 BCE to 312 BCE. According to historian R. C. Majumdar, while all the chronological details provided by Merutunga cannot be accepted without corroborative evidence, they cannot be dismissed as entirely unreliable unless contradicted by more reliable sources.

== Nanda kings ==
The Buddhist, Jain, and Puranic traditions all state that there were nine Nanda kings, but the sources differ considerably on the names of these kings.

According to the Greco-Roman accounts, the Nanda rule spanned two generations. For example, the Roman historian Curtius (1st century CE) suggests that the dynasty's founder was a barber-turned-king, and that his son was the dynasty's last king, who was overthrown by Chandragupta. The Greek accounts name only one Nanda king—Agrammes or Xandrames—who was a contemporary of Alexander. "Agrammes" may be a Greek transcription of the Sanskrit word "Augrasainya" (literally "son or descendant of Ugrasena", Ugrasena being the name of the dynasty's founder according to the Buddhist tradition).

The Puranas, compiled in India in c. 4th century CE (but based on earlier sources), also state that the Nandas ruled for two generations. According to the Puranic tradition, the dynasty's founder was Mahapadma: the Matsya Purana assigns him an incredibly long reign of 88 years, while the Vayu Purana mentions the length of his reign as only 28 years. The Puranas further state that Mahapadma's eight sons ruled in succession after him for a total of 12 years, but name only one of these sons: Sukalpa. A Vayu Purana script names him as "Sahalya", which apparently corresponds to the "Sahalin" mentioned in the Buddhist text Divyavadana. Dhundhi-raja, an 18th-century Puranic commentator, names one of the Nanda kings as Sarvatha-siddhi, and states that his son was Maurya, whose son was Chandragupta Maurya. However, the Puranas themselves do not talk of any relation between the Nanda and the Maurya dynasties.

According to the Sri Lankan Buddhist text Mahavamsa, written in Pali language, there were nine Nanda kings – they were brothers who ruled in succession, for a total of 22 years. These nine kings were:

1. Ugra-sena (Uggasena in Pali)
2. Panduka
3. Pandugati
4. Bhuta-pala
5. Rashtra-pala
6. Govishanaka
7. Dasha-siddhaka
8. Kaivarta
9. Dhana

== Imperial extent ==
An estimate of the territorial evolution of the Magadha empires, including during the rule of predecessors and successors of the Nandas

The Nanda capital was located at Pataliputra (near present-day Patna) in the Magadha region of eastern India. This is confirmed by the Buddhist and Jain traditions, as well as the Sanskrit play Mudrarakshasa. The Puranas also connect the Nandas to the Shaishunaga dynasty, which ruled in the Magadha region. The Greek accounts state that Agrammes (identified as a Nanda king) was the ruler of the Gangaridai (the Ganges valley) and the Prasii (probably a transcription of the Sanskrit word prachyas, literally "easterners"). According to the later writer Megasthenes (c. 300 BCE), Pataliputra (Greek: Palibothra) was located in the country of the Prasii, which further confirms that Pataliputra was the Nanda capital.

The Nanda Empire appears to have stretched from present-day Punjab in the west to Odisha in the east. An analysis of various historical sources – including the ancient Greek accounts, the Puranas, and the Hathigumpha inscription – suggests that the Nandas controlled eastern India, the Ganges valley, and at least a part of Kalinga. It is also highly probable that they controlled the Avanti region in Central India, which made it possible for their successor Chandragupta Maurya to conquer present-day Gujarat western India. According to the Jain tradition, the Nanda minister subjugated the entire country up to the coastal areas.

The Puranas state that the Nanda king Mahapadma destroyed the Kshatriyas, and attained undisputed sovereignty. The Kshatriyas said to have been exterminated by him include Maithalas, Kasheyas, Ikshvakus, Panchalas, Shurasenas, Kurus, Haihayas, Vitihotras, Kalingas, and Ashmakas.

- The Maithala (literally, "of Mithilā") territory was located to the north of Magadha, on the border of present-day Nepal and northern Bihar. This region had come under the control of Magadha during the reign of the 5th century BCE king Ajatashatru. The Nandas probably subjugated the local chieftains, who may have retained some degree of independence from Magadha.
- The Kasheyas were the residents of the area around Kashi, that is, present-day Varanasi. According to the Puranas, a Shaishunaga prince was appointed to govern Kashi, which suggests that this region was under Shaishunaga control. The Nandas may have captured it from a successor of the Shaishunaga prince.
- The Ikshvakus ruled the historical Kosala region of present-day Uttar Pradesh, and had come into conflict with the Magadha kingdom during the reign of Ajatashatru. Their history after the reign of Virudhaka is obscure. A passage of the 11th century story-collection Kathasaritsagara refers to the Nanda camp (kataka) in the Ayodhya town of the Kosala region. This suggests that the Nanda king went on a military campaign to Kosala.
- The Panchalas occupied the Ganges valley to the north-west of the Kosala region, and there are no records of their conflict with the Magadha monarchs before the Nanda period. Therefore, it appears that the Nandas subjugated them. According to the Greek accounts, Alexander expected to face king Agrammes (identified as a Nanda king) if he advanced eastwards from the Punjab region. This suggests that the Nanda territory extended up to the Ganges river in the present-day western Uttar Pradesh.
- The Shurasenas ruled the area around Mathura. The Greek accounts suggest that they were subordinates to the king of the Prasii, that is, the Nanda king.
- The Kuru territory, which included the sacred site of Kurukshetra, was located to the west of the Panchala territory. The Greek records suggest that the king of Gangaridai and Prasii controlled this region, which may be taken as corrorobrative evidence for the Nanda conquest of the Kuru territory.
- The Haihayas ruled the Narmada valley in central India, with their capital at Mahishmati. The Nanda control over this territory does not seem improbable, given that their predecessors – the Shaishunagas – are said to have subjugated the rulers of Avanti in central India (according to the Puranas), and their successors – the Mauryas – are known to have ruled over Central India.
- The Vitihotras, according to the Puranas, were closely associated with the Haihayas. Their sovereignty is said to have ended before the rise of the Pradyota dynasty in Avanti, far earlier than the Nandas and the Shaishunagas came to power. However, a passage in the Bhavishyanukirtana of the Puranas suggests that the Vitihotras were contemporaries of the Shaishunagas. It is possible that the Shaishunagas restored a Pradyota prince as a subordinate ruler, after defeating the Pradyotas. The Nandas may have defeated this Vitihotra ruler. The Jain writers describe the Nandas as the successors of Palaka, the son of king Pradyota.
- The Kalingas occupied the coastal territory in present-day Odisha and Andhra Pradesh. The Nanda control of this region is corroborated by the Hathigumpha inscription of the later king Kharavela (c. 1st or 2nd century BCE). The inscription states that "Nanda-raja" (the Nanda king) had excavated a canal in Kalinga, and had taken a Jain idol from Kalinga. According to the inscription, this canal had been dug "ti-vasa-sata" years ago: the term is variously interpreted as "three hundred" or "one hundred and three".
- The Ashmakas occupied the Godavari valley in the Deccan region. According to one theory, Nanded in this region was originally called "Nau Nand Dehra" (abode of the nine Nandas), which may be considered as evidence of the Nanda control of this area. However, there is no concrete evidence that the Nanda rule extended to the south of the Vindhya range.

The Amaravathi hoard of Punch marked coins have revealed imperial standard coins dating back to the Nandas besides other dynasties of Magadha, including the Mauryas; but it is not certain when this region was annexed by the Magadhan rulers.

Some Kuntala country (North Mysore) inscriptions suggest that the Nandas also ruled it, which included a part of present-day Karnataka in southern India. However, these inscriptions are relatively late (c. 1200 CE), and therefore, cannot be considered as reliable in this context. The Magadha empire included parts of southern India during the reign of the Mauryas – the successors of the Nandas – but there is no satisfactory account of how they came to control this area. For example, an inscription discovered at Bandanikke states:

the Kuntala country (which included the north-western parts of Mysore and the southern parts of the Bombay Presidency) was ruled by the nava-Nanda, Gupta-kula, Mauryya kings; then the Rattas ruled it : after whom were the Chalukyas; then the Kalachuryya family; and after them the (Hoysala) Ballalas.

== Military strength ==
Alexander the Great invaded northwestern India at the time of Agrammes or Xandrames, whom modern historians generally identify as the last Nanda king – Dhana Nanda. In the summer of 326 BCE, Alexander's army reached the Beas River (Greek: Hyphasis), beyond which the Nanda territory was located.

The Greek sources suggest that the Nanda army was five times the size of the Macedonian army. According to Curtius, Alexander learned that Agrammes had 200,000 infantry; 20,000 cavalry; 3,000 elephants; and 2,000 four-horse chariots. Diodorus gives the number of elephants as 4,000. Plutarch inflates these numbers significantly, except the infantry: according to him, the Nanda force included 200,000 infantry; 80,000 cavalry; 6,000 elephants; and 8,000 chariots. It is possible that the numbers reported to Alexander had been exaggerated by the local Indian population, who had the incentive to mislead the invaders.

The Nanda army did not have the opportunity to face Alexander, whose soldiers mutinied at the Beas River, refusing to go any further in the east. Alexander's soldiers had first started to agitate to return to their homeland at Hecatompylos in 330 BCE, and the stiff resistance that they had met in north-western India in the subsequent years had demoralised them. They mutinied, when faced with the prospect of facing the Nanda army, forcing Alexander to withdraw from India.

Greek authors also refer to the Gangaridae and Prasioi as having a fine military tradition, suggesting the fact that during Alexander the Great's invasion of India in the late 4th century BCE, the country was under the rule of two factions. The two factions may have been a confederacy, or one may have overshadowed the other. The king referred to by Diodorus as Xandrames or Agrammes is thought to have been a Nanda king, and this would suggest that the Nandas were in control of this vast country to the east, including the land of the Gangaridae.

== Administration ==
Little information survives on the Nanda administration today. The Puranas describe the Nanda king as ekarat ("single ruler"), which suggests that the Nanda empire was an integrated monarchy rather than a group of virtually independent feudal states. However, the Greek accounts suggest the presence of a more federated system of governance. For example, Arrian mentions that the land beyond the Beas River was governed by "the aristocracy, who exercised their authority with justice and moderation." The Greek accounts mention the Gangaridai and the Prasii separately, although suggesting that these two were ruled by a common sovereign. Historian H. C. Raychaudhuri theorises that the Nandas held centralised control over their core territories in present-day Bihar and Uttar Pradesh, but allowed considerable autonomy in the frontier parts of their empire. This is suggested by Buddhist legends, which state Chandragupta was unable to defeat the Nandas when he attacked their capital but was successful against them when he gradually conquered the frontier regions of their empire.

The Nanda kings appear to have strengthened the Magadha kingdom ruled by their Haryanka and Shaishunaga predecessors, creating the first great empire of northern India in the process. Historians have put forward various theories to explain the political success of these dynasties of Magadha. Pataliputra, the capital of Magadha, was naturally protected because of its location at the junction of the Ganges and the Son rivers. The Ganges and its tributaries connected the kingdom with important trade routes. It had fertile soil and access to lumber and elephants of the adjacent areas. Some historians have suggested that Magadha was relatively free from the Brahmanical orthodoxy, which may have played a role in its political success; however, it is difficult to assess the veracity of this claim. D. D. Kosambi theorised that Magadha's monopoly over iron ore mines played a major role in its imperial expansion, but historian Upinder Singh has disputed this theory, pointing out that Magadha did not have a monopoly over these mines, and the iron mining in the historical Magadha region started much later. Singh, however, notes that the adjoining Chota Nagpur Plateau was rich in many minerals and other raw materials, and access to these would have been an asset for Magadha.

=== Ministers and scholars ===
According to the Jain tradition, Kalpaka was the minister of the first Nanda king. He reluctantly became a minister, but after assuming office, he encouraged the king to adopt an aggressive expansionist policy. The Jain texts suggest that ministerial offices in the Nanda Empire were hereditary. For example, after the death of Shakatala, a minister of the last Nanda king, his position was offered to his son Sthulabhadra; when Sthulabhadra refused the offer, Shakatala's second son Shriyaka was appointed as the minister.

The Brihatkatha tradition claims that under the Nanda rule, the city of Pataliputra became not only the abode of the goddess of material prosperity (Lakshmi), but also of the goddess of learning (Sarasvati). According to this tradition, notable grammarians such as Varsha, Upavarsha, Panini, Katyayana, Vararuchi, and Vyadi lived during the Nanda period. Although much of this account is considered unreliable folklore, it is probable that some of the grammarians who preceded Patanjali lived during the Nanda period.

=== Wealth ===
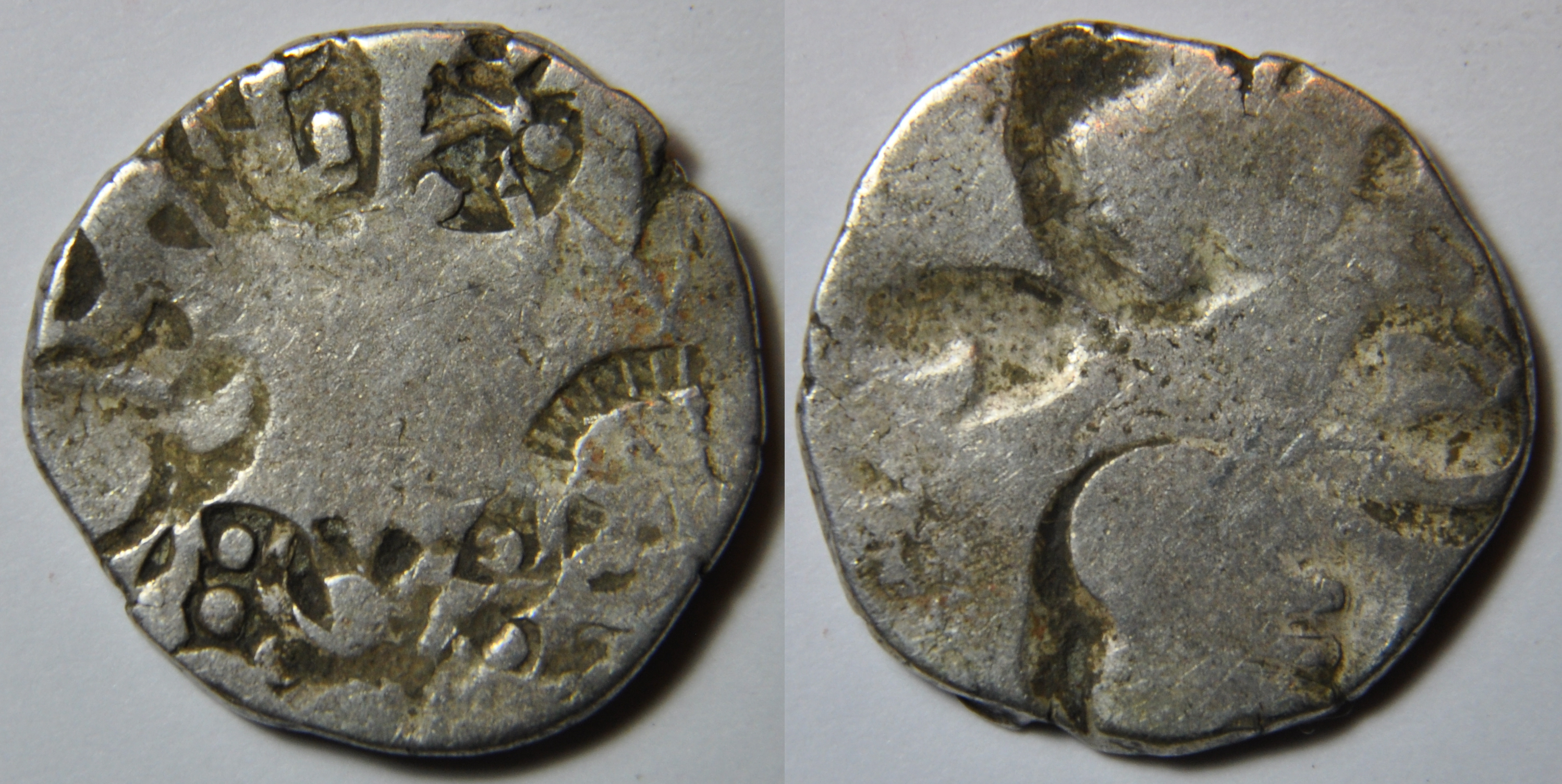
A silver coin of 1 karshapana of the Magadha Empire (ca 600–32 BCE), King Mahapadma Nanda or his sons (ca 346–321 BCE) Obv: different symbols Rev: different symbols including an elephant. Dimensions: 17 mm Weight: 2.5 g.

Several historical sources refer to the great wealth of the Nandas. According to the Mahavamsa, the last Nanda king was a treasure-hoarder, and amassed wealth worth 80 kotis (800 million). He buried these treasures in the bed of the Ganges river. He acquired further wealth by levying taxes on all sorts of objects, including skins, gums, trees, and stones.

A verse by the Tamil poet Mamulanar refers to "the untold wealth of the Nandas", which was "swept away and submerged later on by the floods of the Ganges". Another interpretation of this verse states this wealth was hidden in the waters of the Ganges. The 7th-century Chinese traveller Xuanzang mentions the "five treasures of king Nanda's seven precious substances".

Greek writer Xenophon, in his Cyropaedia (4th century BCE), mentions that the king of India was very wealthy, and aspired to arbitrate in the disputes between the kingdoms of West Asia. Although Xenophon's book describes the events of the 6th century BCE (the period of Cyrus the Great), historian H. C. Raychaudhuri speculates that the writer's image of the Indian king may be based on the contemporary Nanda king.

The Kashika, a commentary on Panini's grammar, mentions Nandopakramani manani – a measuring standard introduced by the Nandas. This may be a reference to their introduction of a new currency system and punch-marked coins, which may have been responsible for much of their wealth. A hoard of coins found at the site of ancient Pataliputra probably belongs to the Nanda period.

== Religion ==
According to Bronkhorst, the Nandas and the Mauryas appear to have patronised the religions originating in the Greater Magadha region, namely Jainism and Ajivikism. Vardhamāna or Mahāvīra (599-527 BCE), the 24th Tīrthāṅkara of Jainism spent some time in Astikagrama, according to the Jain scripture of Kalpa Sūtra. This place was renamed as Vardhamana in his honour. Other early references to Jainism in the region include the 4th-century BCE Hatigumpha inscription, where King Khāravela of Kalinga, a Jain devotee, retrieved a Jina image taken by a Nanda ruler of Gangaridai, indicating possible Jain influence in the region. However, the rulers of the empire never engaged in conversion of their subjects to other religions and there is no evidence that these rulers discriminated against any contemporary religion. Greater Magadha, east of the confluence of the Ganges and the Yamuna, was the area where the second urbanisation took place, and where Jainism and Buddhism originated. According to Bronkhorst, it was outside Aryavarta, the heartland of Vedic Brahmanism west of this confluence, primarily associated with a single state, the Kuru kingdom. According to Bronkhorst, the Nanda emperors, and later the Mauryan emperors, had little interest in Brahmanism, and the conquest of the Vedic heartland by the Nanda and Maurya rule deprived the Brahmins of their patrons, threatening the survival of the Vedic ritual tradition, and creating opportunities for Buddhists and Jains to spread their religion outside the confines of Magadha. The much later Jain legends suggests that several Nanda ministers were inclined towards Jainism. When Shakatala, a minister of the last Nanda king, died, his son Sthulabhadra refused to inherit his father's office, and instead became a Jain monk. Sthulabhadra's brother Shriyaka accepted the post.

However, several other Indologists and scholars have questioned Johannes Bronkhorst's claim of a sharp cultural divide between east and west, the supposed lesser influence of Brahmanisation in early Magadha, and his proposed revision of textual chronology, while also criticising him for overlooking the role of socioeconomic and political developments in shaping new ideological trends.

According to Patrick Olivelle, those who see Sramana seers of Magadha as non-Brahmanical, anti-Brahmanical, or even non-Aryan precursors of later sectarian ascetics are drawing conclusions that far outstrip the available evidence.

== Architecture ==
Pataliputra Voussoir Arch

A granite stone fragment of an arch discovered by K. P. Jayaswal from Kumhrar, Pataliputra has been analysed as a pre Maurya-Nanda period keystone fragment of a trefoil arch of gateway with mason's marks of three archaic Brahmi letters inscribed on it which probably decorated a Torana. The wedge-shaped stone with indentation has Mauryan polish on two sides and was suspended vertically.

== Nanda era ==
According to K. P Jayaswal, Nanda era is mentioned in three sources. Kharavela's Hathigumpha inscription mentions Nandaraja constructing canal 103rd year of the Nanda period. According to Al-Biruni, the Sri-Harsha era was being used in areas of Kannauj and Mathura and there was a difference of 400 years between Sri-Harsha era and Vikrama era which would make it fall in 458 BCE, the attributes of which matched with the Nanda kings. According to 12th-century Yedarava inscription of Chalukya king Vikramaditya VI, Nanda era along with Vikram era and Shaka era were extant which were abolished in favour of a new Chalukyan era, but other scholars have opined that evidences are too meagre to make anything conclusive.

== Unpopularity and overthrow ==
All historical accounts agree that the last Nanda king was unpopular among his subjects. According to Diodorus, Porus told Alexander that the contemporary Nanda king was a man of "worthless character", and was not respected by his subjects as he was thought to be of low origin. Curtius also states that according to Porus, the Nanda king was despised by his subjects. According to Plutarch, who claims that Androkottos (identified as Chandragupta) met Alexander, Androkottos later declared that Alexander could have easily conquered the Nanda territory (Gangaridai and Prasii) because the Nanda king was hated and despised by his subjects, as he was wicked and of low origin. The Sri Lankan Buddhist tradition blames the Nandas for being greedy and for imposing oppressive taxation. The Puranas of India label the Nandas as adharmika, indicating that they did not follow the norms of dharma or righteous conduct.

The Nanda dynasty was overthrown by Chandragupta Maurya, who was supported by his mentor (and later minister) Chanakya. Some accounts mention Chandragupta as a member of the Nanda family. For example, the 11th century writers Kshemendra and Somadeva describe Chandragupta as a "son of the genuine Nanda" (purva-Nanda-suta). Dhundiraja, in his commentary on the Vishnu Purana, names Chandragupta's father as Maurya; he describes Maurya as a son of the Nanda king Sarvatha-siddhi and a hunter's daughter named Mura.

The Buddhist text Milinda Panha mentions a war between the Nanda general Bhaddasala (Sanskrit: Bhadrashala) and Chandragupta. According to the text, this war led to the slaughter of 10,000 elephants; 100,000 horses; 5,000 charioteers; and a billion foot soldiers. While this is obviously an exaggeration, it suggests that the overthrow of the Nanda dynasty was a violent affair.

== Sources ==
- Bronkhorst, Johannes (2007). Greater Magadha. Brill.
- Bronkhorst, Johannes (2011). Buddhism in the Shadow of Brahmanism. BRILL. ISBN 978-90-04-20140-8.
- Dilip Kumar Ganguly (1984). History and Historians in Ancient India. Abhinav Publications. p. 23. ISBN 978-0-391-03250-7.
- Irfan Habib; Vivekanand Jha (2004). Mauryan India. A People's History of India. Aligarh Historians Society / Tulika Books. ISBN 978-81-85229-92-8.
- Hiltebeitel, Alf (2007), Hinduism. In: Joseph Kitagawa, "The Religious Traditions of Asia: Religion, History, and Culture". Digital printing 2007, Routledge, ISBN 978-1-136-87590-8, archived from the original on 3 July 2023
- Jyoti Prasad Jain (2005) [1964]. Jaina Sources of the History of Ancient India: 100 BC - AD 900. Munshiram Manoharlal. ISBN 9788121511407.
- R. C. Majumdar (1976). Readings in political history of India: Ancient, Mediaeval, and Modern. B.R. / Indian Society for Prehistoric and Quaternary Studies. ISBN 9788176467841.
- Mackenzie, John, ed. (12 January 2016). "Nanda Empire". The Encyclopedia of Empire (1 ed.). Wiley. doi:10.1002/9781118455074. ISBN 978-1-118-44064-3.
- Nath, Vijay (2001), "From 'Brahmanism' to 'Hinduism': Negotiating the Myth of the Great Tradition", Social Scientist, 29 (3/4): 19–50, doi:10.2307/3518337, JSTOR 3518337
- R. K. Mookerji (1966). Chandragupta Maurya and His Times. Motilal Banarsidass. ISBN 978-81-208-0405-0.
- H. C. Raychaudhuri (1988) [1967]. "India in the Age of the Nandas". In K. A. Nilakanta Sastri (ed.). Age of the Nandas and Mauryas (Second ed.). Delhi: Motilal Banarsidass. ISBN 978-81-208-0466-1.
- Roy, Kaushik (15 October 2012). Hinduism and the Ethics of Warfare in South Asia: From Antiquity to the Present. Cambridge University Press. ISBN 978-1-107-01736-8.
- Singh, Upinder (2008). A History of Ancient and Early Medieval India: From the Stone Age to the 12th Century. Pearson Education India. ISBN 978-81-317-1677-9.
- Sujato, Bhikkhu; Brahmali, Bhikkhu (2014). The Authenticity of the Early Buddhist Texts. Buddhist Publication Society.
- Ian Worthington (2014). By the Spear: Philip II, Alexander the Great, and the Rise and Fall of the Macedonian Empire. Oxford University Press. ISBN 978-0-19-992986-3.
- Ramesh, Sangaralingam (2023). "The Nanda Empire: 400 BC to 322 BC". The Political Economy of India's Economic Development: 5000BC to 2022AD, Volume I. Palgrave Macmillan. ISBN 9783031420726.

Timeline and cultural period	Indus plain (Punjab-Sapta Sindhu-Gujarat)	Gangetic Plain			Central India	Southern India
Timeline and cultural period	Indus plain (Punjab-Sapta Sindhu-Gujarat)	Upper Gangetic Plain (Ganga-Yamuna doab)	Middle Gangetic Plain	Lower Gangetic Plain	Central India	Southern India
IRON AGE
Culture	Late Vedic Period	Late Vedic Period; Painted Grey Ware culture	Late Vedic Period; Northern Black Polished Ware		Pre-history	
6th century BCE	Gandhara	Kuru-Panchala	Magadha		Adivasi (tribes)	Assaka
Culture	Persian-Greek influences	"Second Urbanisation"; Rise of Shramana movements Jainism - Buddhism - Ājīvika - Yoga			Pre-history	
5th century BCE	(Persian conquests)		Shaishunaga dynasty		Adivasi (tribes)	Assaka
4th century BCE	(Greek conquests)	Nanda empire				
HISTORICAL AGE
Culture	Spread of Buddhism				Pre-history	
3rd century BCE	Maurya Empire					Satavahana dynasty Sangam period (300 BCE – 200 CE); Early Cholas; Early Pandyan kingdom Cheras
Culture	Preclassical Hinduism (Note: Michaels (2004) p.39) - "Hindu Synthesis" (Note: Hiltebeitel (2002)) (ca. 200 BCE - 300 CE) (Note: Michaels (2004) p.39) (Note: Hiltebeitel (2002)); Epics - Puranas - Ramayana - Mahabharata - Bhagavad Gita - Brahma Sutras - Smarta Tradition; Mahayana Buddhism					
2nd century BCE	Indo-Greek Kingdom		Shunga Empire; Maha-Meghavahana Dynasty			Satavahana dynasty Sangam period (300 BCE – 200 CE); Early Cholas; Early Pandyan kingdom Cheras
1st century BCE	Indo-Greek Kingdom		Shunga Empire; Maha-Meghavahana Dynasty			Satavahana dynasty Sangam period (300 BCE – 200 CE); Early Cholas; Early Pandyan kingdom Cheras
1st century CE	Indo-Scythians; Indo-Parthians		Kuninda Kingdom			Satavahana dynasty Sangam period (300 BCE – 200 CE); Early Cholas; Early Pandyan kingdom Cheras
2nd century	Kushan Empire					Satavahana dynasty Sangam period (300 BCE – 200 CE); Early Cholas; Early Pandyan kingdom Cheras
3rd century	Kushano-Sasanian Kingdom; Western Satraps	Kushan Empire		Kamarupa kingdom	Adivasi (tribes)	Satavahana dynasty Sangam period (300 BCE – 200 CE); Early Cholas; Early Pandyan kingdom Cheras
Culture	"Golden Age of Hinduism"(ca. CE 320-650) (Note: Michaels (2004) p.40); Puranas - Kural; Co-existence of Hinduism and Buddhism					
4th century	Kidarites	Gupta Empire; Varman dynasty				Andhra Ikshvakus; Kalabhra dynasty Kadamba Dynasty; Western Ganga Dynasty
5th century	Hephthalite Empire	Alchon Huns				Vishnukundina; Kalabhra dynasty
6th century	Nezak Huns; Kabul Shahi; Maitraka				Adivasi (tribes)	Vishnukundina; Badami Chalukyas; Kalabhra dynasty
Culture	Late-Classical Hinduism (ca. CE 650-1100) (Note: Michaels (2004) p.41); Advaita Vedanta - Tantra; Decline of Buddhism in India					
7th century	Indo-Sassanids		Vakataka dynasty Empire of Harsha	Mlechchha dynasty	Adivasi (tribes)	Badami Chalukyas; Eastern Chalukyas; Pandyan kingdom (revival); Pallava
7th century	Karkota dynasty				Adivasi (tribes)	
8th century	Kabul Shahi	Pala Empire			Adivasi (tribes)	Eastern Chalukyas; Pandyan kingdom Kalachuri
9th century	Gurjara-Pratihara				Adivasi (tribes)	Rashtrakuta Empire; Eastern Chalukyas; Pandyan kingdom Medieval Cholas; Chera Perumals of Makkotai
10th century	Ghaznavids			Pala dynasty Kamboja-Pala dynasty	Adivasi (tribes)	Kalyani Chalukyas; Eastern Chalukyas; Medieval Cholas; Chera Perumals of Makkotai; Rashtrakuta
References and sources for table References Sources: Flood, Gavin D. (1996), An Introduction to Hinduism, Cambridge University Press; Hiltebeitel, Alf (2002), Hinduism. In: Joseph Kitagawa, "The Religious Traditions of Asia: Religion, History, and Culture", Routledge; Michaels, Axel (2004), Hinduism. Past and present, Princeton, New Jersey: Princeton University Press
