= Vatsa =

Historical region in modern India

Kingdom of Vatsa
- c. 700 BCE–c. 300 BCE
- Vatsa and other Mahajanapadas in the Post Vedic period.
- Capital: Kauśāmbī, Prayāga
- Common languages: Prakrit; Sanskrit
- Religion: Historical Vedic religion Jainism; Buddhism
- Government: Monarchy
- Maharaja
  - 8th century B.C.: Nicakṣu (first)
  - 4th century B.C.: Kṣemaka (last)
- Historical era: Iron Age
  - Established: c. 700 BCE
  - Disestablished: c. 300 BCE
Preceded by	Succeeded by
Kuru Kingdom	Magadha
- Today part of: Allahabad division of Uttar Pradesh, India

Vatsa or Vamsa (IPA: [ʋɐt̪sɐ], Pali and Ardhamagadhi: Vaccha, IPA: [ʋɐtːʃʰɐ], literally "calf") was one of the sixteen Mahajanapadas (great kingdoms) of Uttarapatha of ancient India mentioned in the Aṅguttara Nikāya.

== Location ==
The territory of Vatsa was located to the south of the Gaṅgā river, and its capital was the city of Kauśāmbī or Kosāmbī, on the Yamunā river and corresponding to the modern-day location of Kosam.

== The early period ==
The Vatsas were a branch of the Kuru dynasty. During the Rig Vedic period, the Kuru Kingdom comprised the area of present day Haryana/ Delhi and the Ganga-Jamuna Doab, till Prayag/ Kaushambi, with its capital at Hastinapura. During the late-Vedic period, Hastinapura was destroyed by floods, and the Kuru King Nicakṣu shifted his capital and all his subjects to a newly constructed capital that was called Kosambi or Kaushambi. In the post Vedic period, when Aryavarta consisted of several Mahajanapadas, the Kuru Dynasty was split between Kurus and Vatsas. The Kurus controlled the Haryana/ Delhi/ Upper Doab, while the Vatsas controlled the Lower Doab. Later, The Vatsas were further divided into two branches—One at Mathura, and the other at Kaushambi.

The Puranas state that after the washing away of Hastinapura by the Ganges, the Bhārata king Nicakṣu, the great-great grandson of Janamejaya, abandoned the city and settled in Kauśāmbī. This is supported by the Svapnavāsavadattā and the Pratijñā-Yaugandharāyaṇa attributed to Bhāsa. Both of them have described the king Udayana as a scion of the Bhāratas family (Bhārata-kula). The Puranas provide a list of Nicakṣu’s successors which ends with king Kṣemaka. Other Puranas state that the Vatsa kingdom was named after a Kaśī king, Vatsa. The Ramayana and the Mahabharata attribute the credit of founding its capital Kauśāmbī to a Chedi prince Kuśa or Kuśāmba.

The Mahabharata and the Harivansa states the close connection between the Vatsas and the Bhargas (Bhaggas).

== Mahajanapada period ==
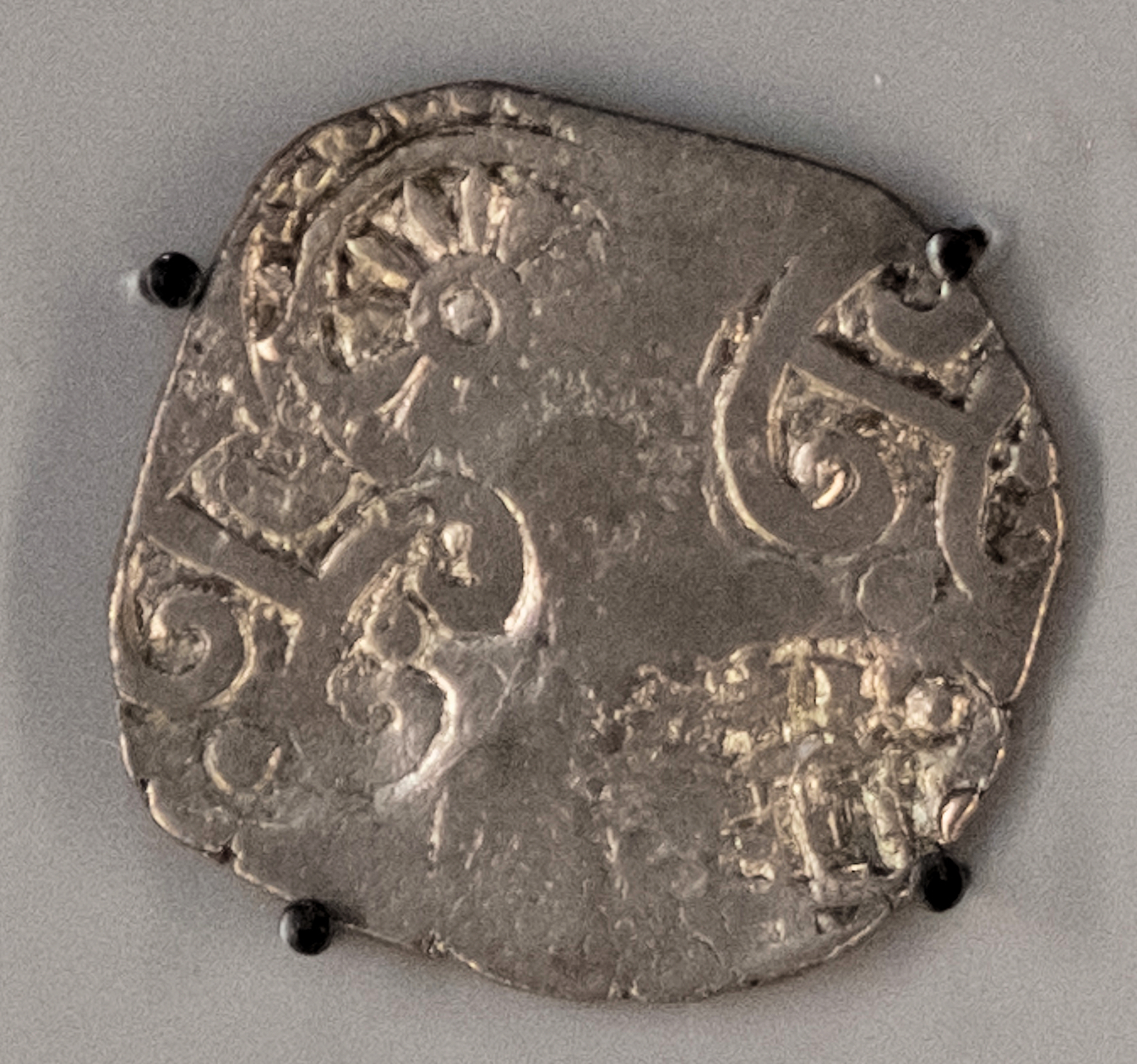
Vatsya coin (400-300 BCE)

The first ruler of the Bhārata dynasty of Vatsa, about whom some definite information available is Śatānīka II, Parantapa. While the Puranas state his father’s name was Vasudāna, Bhāsa tells it was Sahasrānīka. Śatānīka II married a princess of Videha, who was the mother of Udayana. He also married Mṛgāvatī, a daughter of the Licchavi chieftain Ceṭaka. He attacked Campā, the capital of Aṅga during the rule of Dadhivāhana.

The wife of Śatānīka and the mother of Udayana was Queen Mṛgāvatī (in Sanskrit) or Migāvatī (in Prakrit). She was the daughter of Chetaka, the leader of Vaishali. It is recorded that she ruled as a regent for her son for some period of time, although sources differ about the specific circumstances. According to the Jain canonical texts, Udayana was still a minor when Śatānīka died, so "the responsibility of governing the kingdom fell on the shoulders of queen Migāvatī ... till her son grew old enough". On the other hand, Bhāsa's Pratijñāyaugandharāyaṇa says that she took "full charge of the administration" while Udayana was held as a prisoner by King Pradyota of Avanti, and "the way in which she discharged her duties excited the admiration of even experienced ministers". Mrigavati, is notable for being one of the earliest known female rulers in Indian history.

=== Udayana ===
Udayana, the son of Śatānīka II by the Videha princess succeeded him. Udayana, the romantic hero of the Svapnavāsavadattā, the Pratijñā-Yaugandharāyaṇa and many other legends was a contemporary of Buddha and of Pradyota, the king of Avanti.

== Later history ==
According to the Puranas, the 4 successors of Udayana were Vahināra, DanḍapāṇI, Niramitra and Kṣemaka. Later, the Vatsa kingdom was annexed by the Avanti kingdom. Maniprabha, the great-grandson of Pradyota ruled at Kauśāmbī as a prince of Avanti.

Vatsa was ultimately annexed into Magadha by Shishunaga.

== See also ==
- Kingdoms of Ancient India
