= Kalashoka =

King of Magadha from c. 395 BC to c. 367 BC

King of Magadha
- Reign: c. 395 – c. 367 BCE
- Predecessor: Shishunaga
- Successor: Nandivardhana (Magadha throne)
- Issue: Bhadrasena; Korandavarna; Mangura; Sarvanjaha; Jalika; Ubhaka; Sanjaya; Koravya; Nandivardhana; Panchamaka
- Dynasty: Shishunaga dynasty
- Father: Shishunaga

Kalashoka or Kakavarna was the son and successor of Shishunaga. He divided his kingdom between his ten sons and crowned his ninth son, Nandivardhana as the king of Magadha.

== Reign ==
Shishunaga had transferred the capital of Magadha to Vaishali. Kalashoka succeeded his father Shishunaga. Kalashoka again transferred the capital to Pataliputra.

According to Buddhist literature, the Second Buddhist Council, held 100 years after the Maha Parinirvana of Lord Buddha, in Vaishali, was patronised by King Kalashoka. But despite King Kalashoka's best efforts, differences among the Buddhists persisted. He divided his kingdom between his ten sons, who ruled simultaneously.
