= Nāgadāsaka =

Haryanka emperor from 437 to 413 BCE

King of Magadha
- Reign: c. 437 – c. 413 BCE (24 years)
- Predecessor: Munda
- Successor: Shishunaga (who founded Shishunaga dynasty)
- Issue: Jaladhika, Upasita, Kañcana
- Dynasty: Haryanka
- Father: Munda

Nāgadāsaka was the last ruler of Haryanka dynasty from 437 to 413 BCE and son of Munda. He murdered his father and ruled for twenty-four years. The people deposed him and made Shishunaga king in his place. Shishunaga was the founder of Shishunaga dynasty.

According to Buddhist tradition, he was the last of Haryanka rulers who was replaced by his amatya (minister), Shishunaga.
