= Haryanka dynasty =

Ruling dynasty of Magadha (544–413 BCE)

Haryanka Dynasty
- 544 BCE–413 BCE
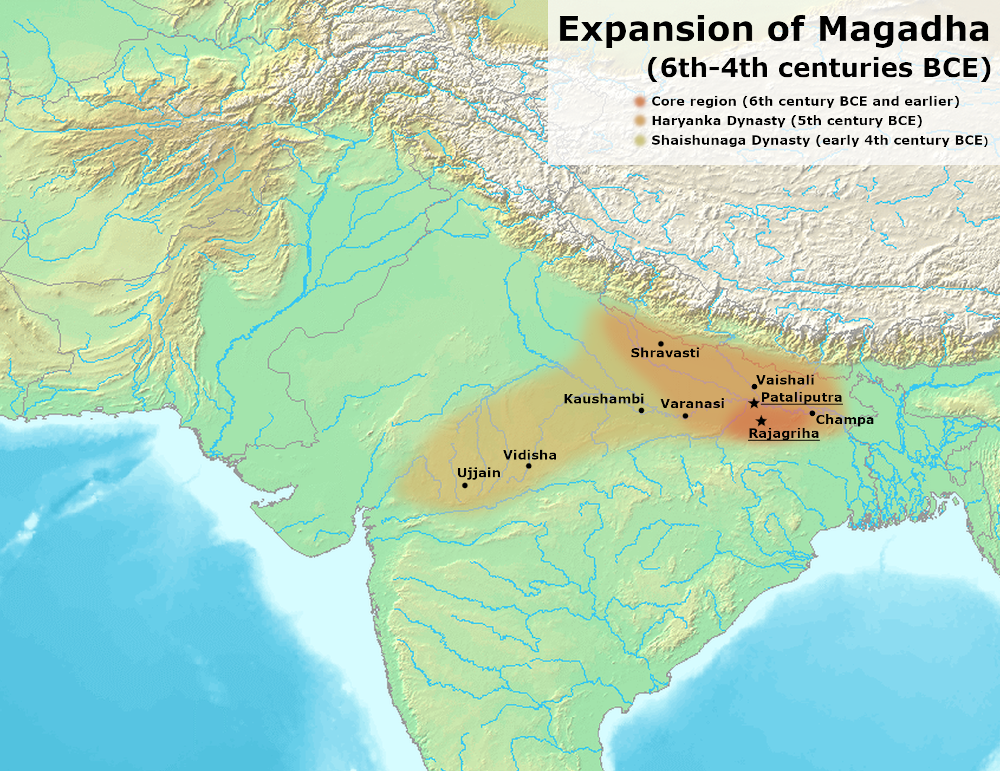
- The approximate extent of the Haryanka dynasty and the Shaisunaga dynasty between the 6th and 5th century BCE.
- Capital: Rajagriha later Pataliputra
- Common languages: Magadhi Prakrit; Other Prakrits
- Religion: Jainism; Buddhism
- Government: Monarchy
- King
  - 544–492 BCE: Bimbisara
  - 492–460 BCE: Ajatashatru
  - 460–444 BCE: Udayin
  - 444–440 BCE: Anuruddha
  - 440–437 BCE: Munda
  - 437–413 BCE: Nāgadāsaka
- History
  - Established: 544 BCE
  - Disestablished: 413 BCE
Preceded by
Pradyota dynasty
Kosala
Anga
Vajjika League
Moriya
Succeeded by
Shaishunaga dynasty
- Today part of: India

The Haryanka dynasty (Sanskrit: हर्यंक; IAST: Haryaṅka) was the ruling dynasty of Magadha, according to the Buddhist text Mahavamsa between 544 BC and 413 BC though some scholars favour a later chronology (5th century BCE to first half of 4th century BCE). Initially, the capital was Rajagriha. Later, it was shifted to Pataliputra, near present-day Patna in India during the reign of Udayin. Bimbisara is considered to be the founder of the dynasty.

According to the Mahavamsa, Bimbisara was appointed king by his father, Bhattiya, at the age of fifteen. This dynasty was succeeded by the Shaishunaga dynasty.

== Governance ==
The governance structure of Haryanka dynasty is mentioned in ancient texts. They mention gramakas (village headmen) who headed village assemblies and mahamatras (high-ranking officials) who had executive, judicial and military functions.

Historically, this period coincided with the Achaemenid conquest of the Indus Valley during the rule of Darius I from about 517/516 BCE.

== Rulers ==
=== Bimbisara ===
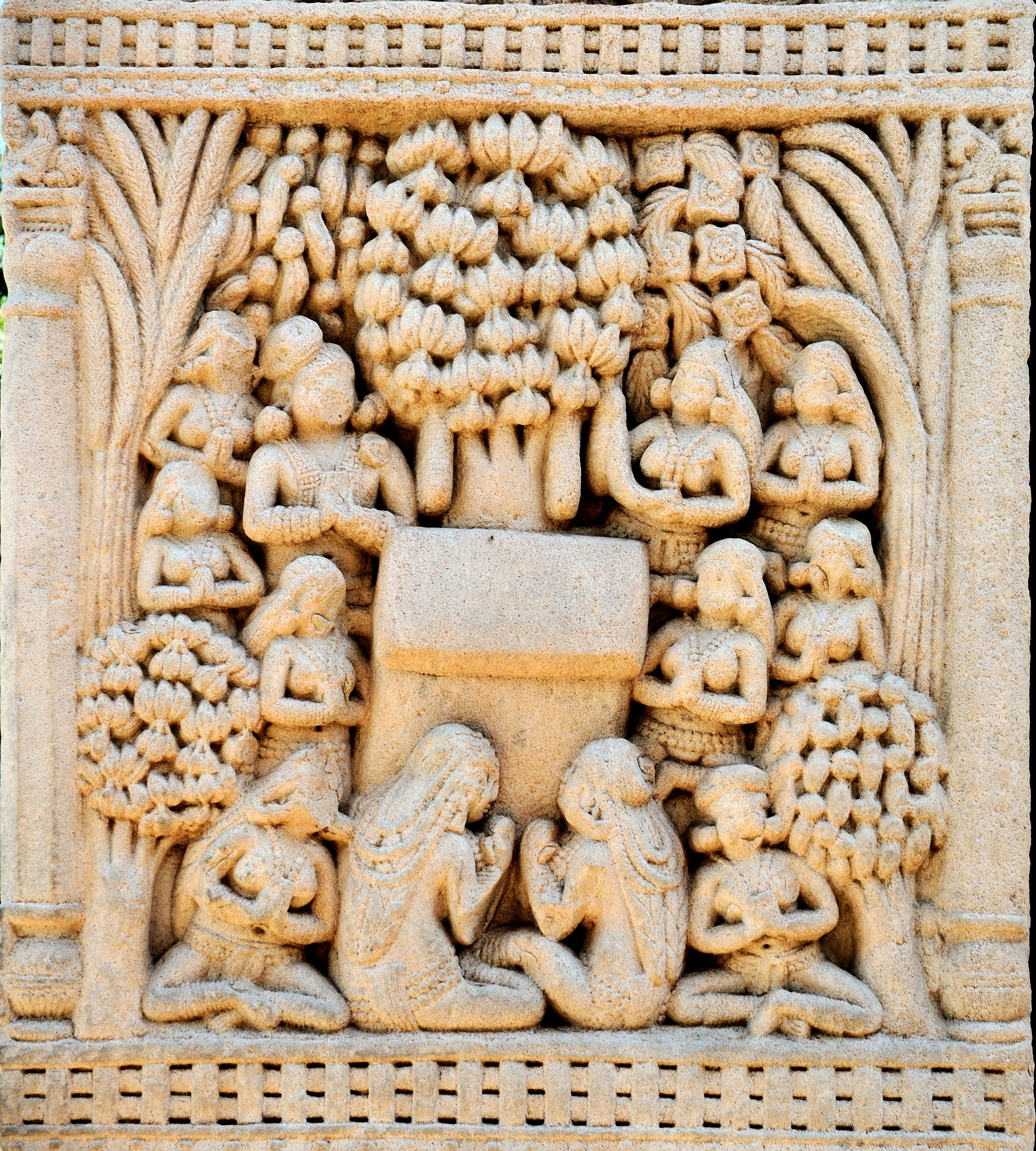
King Bimbisara of the Magadha Haryanka dynasty visits the Bamboo Garden (Venuvana) in Rajagriha; artwork from Sanchi.

Bimbisara reigned from 544 to 492 BCE, according to the Mahavamsa chronology. The extent of his kingdom is mentioned in Mahavagga. His advisors included Sona Kolivisa, Sumana (flower gatherer), Koliya (minister), Kumbhaghosaka (treasurer) and Jīvaka (physician). He was given the title of Seniya.

Both Jain and Buddhist texts claim the king was a follower of their respective religions. Uttaradhyayana Sutra says he was a follower of Mahavira, whereas Sutta Nipata depicts him and his wife, Khema, as followers of Buddha. The latter further mentions he deputed Jīvaka to assist Buddha's Sangha. He also married Chellana and Kosala Devi, sister of Pasenadi.

According to George Turnour and N.L. Dey, the name of the father of Bimbisara was Bhatiya or Bhattiya, but the Puranas refer him as Hemajit, Kshemajit, Kshetroja or Ksetrauja and the Tibetan texts mention him as Mahapadma.

=== Ajatashatru ===
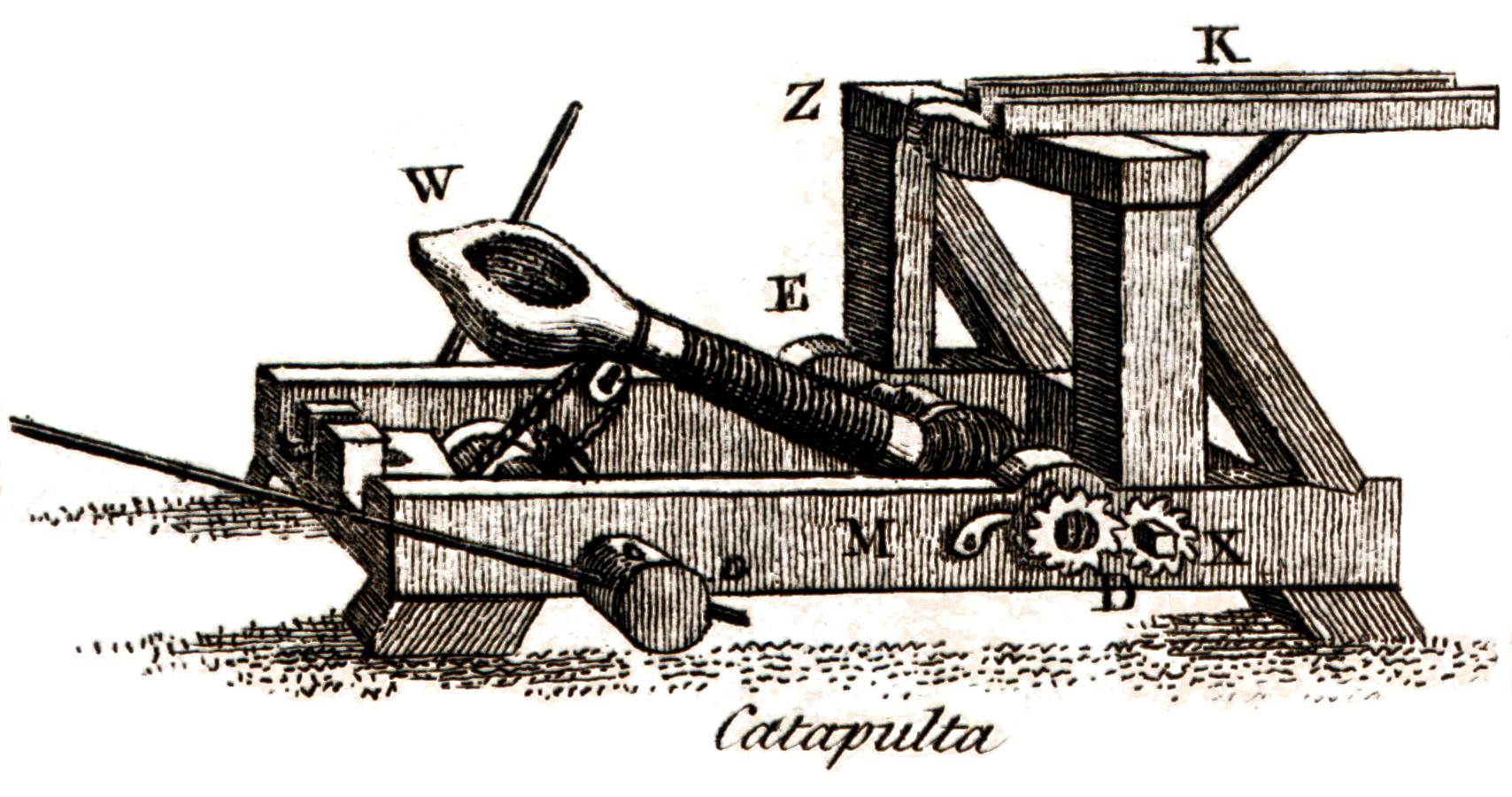
Ajatashatru of Magadha used catapults against the Licchavis.

Ajatashatru reigned from 493 to 462 BCE, according to the Mahavamsa chronology. He married Vajira, Kosala's princess.

In some sources, Bimbisara was imprisoned and killed by his son and successor, Ajatashatru, under whose rule the dynasty reached its largest extent. Ajatashatru was contemporary with Mahavira and Gautama Buddha. Ajatashatru fought a war against the Vajjika League, ruled by the Lichhavis, and conquered them.

=== Udayin ===
Udayin or Udayabhadra is mentioned in Buddhist and Jain texts as the successor of Ajatashatru. The Puranas, however, mention him as the fourth king after Darshaka.

=== Later rulers ===
Puranas mention Nandivardhana and Mahanandin as successors of Udayin. According to Buddhist tradition, Anurudhha, Munda and Nagadarshaka were his successors. However, Jain texts mention that Udayin was killed by an assassin of rival kingdom. Being childless, he was succeeded by Nanda who was selected by his ministers.

=== List of Rulers ===
According to Mahavamsa:

- Bimbisara (544–492 BCE)
- Ajatashatru (492–460 BCE)
- Udayin (460–444 BCE)
- Anuruddha (444–440 BCE)
- Munda (440–437 BCE)
- Darshaka (437 BCE)
- Nāgadāsaka (437–413 BCE)

== Chronology ==
Historian K. T. S. Sarao — who favors the Buddhist "short chronology" — has dated Bimbisara's reign to c. 457-c.405 BCE, Ajatashatru's reign to c. 405-373 BCE, and Udayin's reign to c. 373-357 BCE, i.e., only a short time before the Nanda dynasty which preceded Chandragupta Maurya. Sarao has suggested that the kingdom of Magadha became divided after Udayin's death: with the "suspicious" lists of different successors listed in various texts possibly having ruled in different locations simultaneously instead of one after another, until the kingdom was re-unified. Similarly, Keay — another proponent of the Short Chronology — states that there is great uncertainty about the royal succession for this period, probably because there was a period of "court intrigues and murders," during which "evidently the throne changed hands frequently, perhaps with more than one incumbent claiming to occupy it at the same time" until Mahapadma Nanda was able to secure the throne.

== Decline ==
According to the Mahavamsa, Haryanka dynasty was overthrown by their Amatya (minister), Shishunaga who then established Shaishunaga Dynasty. However, Jain texts mention that Udayin was killed by an assassin of rival kingdom. Being childless, he was succeeded by Nanda who was selected by his ministers.

== See also ==
- Magadha-Vajji war
- Pradyota dynasty
- Avanti-Magadhan Wars

Preceded by Pradyota dynasty	Haryanka dynasty middle of 6th century –425 BCE	Succeeded by Shishunaga dynasty
