= Shaishunaga dynasty =

Second ruling dynasty of Magadha (413–345 BCE)

- 413 BCE–345 BCE
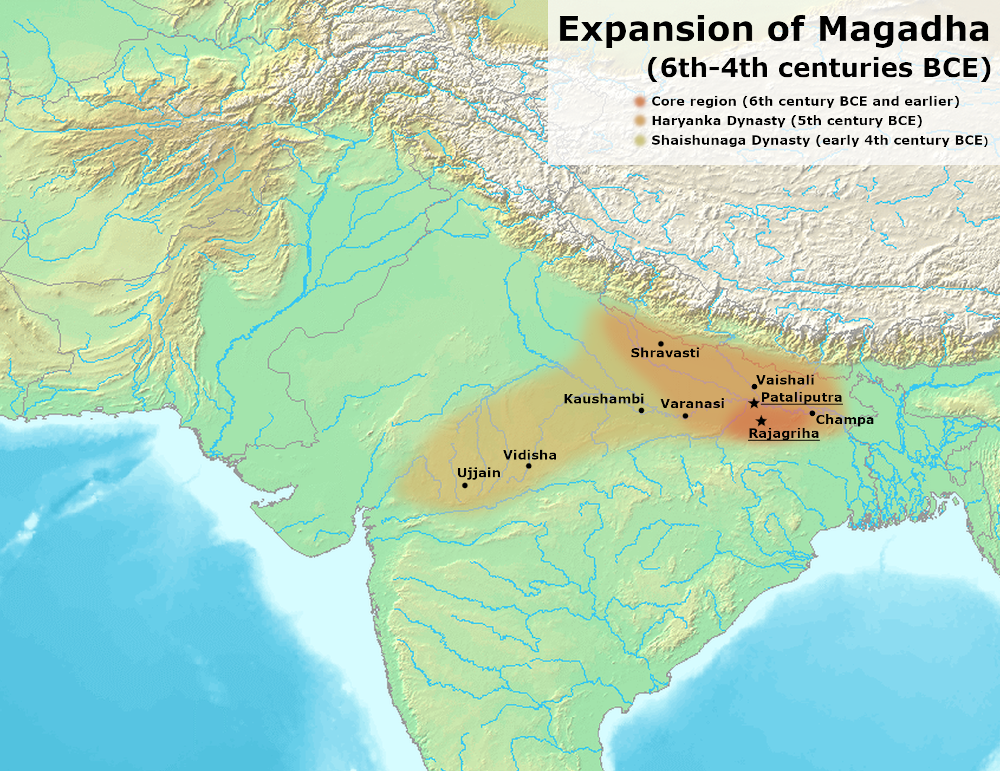
- Approximate extent of the Shaishunaga dynasty.
- Capital: Rajgir (primary); Vaishali (secondary) later Pataliputra
- Common languages: Sanskrit; Magadhi Prakrit; Other Prakrits
- Religion: Hinduism; Historical Vedic religion Buddhism; Jainism
- Government: Monarchy
- King
  - 413–395 BCE: Shishunaga
  - 395–367 BCE: Kalashoka
  - 367–355 BCE: Nandivardhana
  - 355–345 BCE: Mahanandin
- History
  - Established: 413 BCE
  - Disestablished: 345 BCE
Preceded by
Haryanka dynasty
Avanti
Matsya
Succeeded by
Nanda Empire

Part of a series on the
History of Bihar
Ancient History
Prehistoric and Vedic Era

- Chirand (Neolithic) - Vedic period - Videha - Mithila (ancient) - Anga - Kikata

Urbanisation and Shramana

- Second Urbanisation - Rise of Shramana - Buddhism • Jainism • Ajivika

Gaṇasaṅghas

- Magadha - Vajjika League

  - Nāya
  - Vajji (tribe)
  - Licchavis of Vaishali

- Malla (tribe) - Kashi - Bulis

Imperial Magadha

- Brihadratha dynasty - Haryanka dynasty

  - Bimbisara
  - Ajatashatru

- Shishunaga dynasty - Nanda Empire

  - Mahapadma Nanda

- Maurya Empire

  - Chandragupta Maurya
  - Ashoka
Post-Mauryan and Smriti

- Shunga Empire

  - Pushyamitra Shunga

- Kanva dynasty - Development of Smriti - Brahmanical Revival

The Interregnum

- Kushan Influence - Mitra Dynasty - Resurgence of Licchavis

Classical and medieval
The Classical Age

- Gupta Empire

Early Medieval

- Later Gupta dynasty - Maukharis

Pala Era and Feudatories

- Pala Empire - Khayaravala dynasty - Pithipatis of Magadha

Medieval Mithila

- Karnats of Mithila - Oiniwar dynasty

Islamic Incursions

- Delhi Sultanate

Centers of Learning

- Nalanda - Vikramashila - Odantapuri - Telhara monastery

Early-modern
Afghan and Mughal Rule

- Sur Empire

  - Sher Shah Suri

- Mughal Empire

  - Bihar Subah
Regional Chieftaincies

- Chakwars - Chero dynasty - Gidhaur chieftaincy - Kharagpur Raj - Khokhra chieftaincy

Major Zamindari Estates

- Bettiah Raj - Khandavala dynasty - Dumraon Raj - Hathwa Raj - Jagdishpur estate

Colonial & Independence Era
Colonial Rule (1764–1947)

- Battle of Buxar (1764) - East India Company - Permanent Settlement (1793) - Santhal rebellion - Indian Rebellion of 1857

  - Kunwar Singh

- Bihar famine of 1873–74 - Bihar Province (Est. 1912) - 1934 Nepal–Bihar earthquake

Freedom Struggle

- Champaran Satyagraha (1917) - Salt Satyagraha - Bihar Vidyapeeth - Kisan Sabha

  - Swami Sahajanand Saraswati

- Quit India Movement

  - Azad Dasta
Modern Era (Post-1947)
Congress Era (1947–1967)

- Sri Krishna Sinha - Anugrah Narayan Sinha - Zamindari Abolition

Socialist and JP Era (1967–1989)

- Karpoori Thakur - Bihar Movement (1974) - Jayaprakash Narayan - Bhagalpur riots (1989)

RJD Era (1990–2005)

- Lalu Prasad Yadav - Rabri Devi - Fodder Scam

State Division (2000)

- Bihar Reorganisation Act, 2000 - Creation of Jharkhand

NDA Era (2005–Present)

- Nitish Kumar - Politics of Bihar

Culture, art, and society
Art and architecture

- Mahabodhi Temple - Nalanda - Barabar Caves - Tomb of Sher Shah Suri - Rohtas Fort - Golghar - Mithila Painting - Patna Qalam - Manjusha Art - Didarganj Yakshi

Society and language

- Bihari culture - Mithila • Magadh • Anga - Bihari languages

  - Maithili • Magahi
  - Bhojpuri • Angika
Religion

- Religion in Bihar - Buddhism in Bihar - Jainism in Bihar - Islam in Bihar - Sikhism in Bihar

Portal India Portal Bihar

The Shaishunaga dynasty (IAST: Śaiśunāga, literally "of Shishunaga") was possibly the second ruling dynasty of Magadha. According to the Buddhist text Mahavamsa, this dynasty was the second ruling dynasty of Magadha, succeeding Nagadashaka of the Haryanka dynasty. The Brahminic Puranas have given a different list with different chronology of the Shaishunaga dynasty kings, whereas Jain texts do not mention this dynasty.

== History ==
Shishunaga was the founder of the dynasty. He was initially an amatya or "minister" of the last Haryanka dynasty ruler Nāgadāsaka and ascended to the throne after a popular rebellion in c. 413 BCE.

The capital of this dynasty initially was Vaishali; but later shifted to Pataliputra, near the present day Patna, during the reign of Kalashoka.

According to tradition, Kalashoka was succeeded by his ten sons. This dynasty was succeeded by the Nanda dynasty in c. 345 BCE.

=== Historicity ===
Jain texts have skipped over the Shaishunaga dynasty. They mention instead that Udayin (of the preceding Haryanka dynasty) was killed by an assassin of rival kingdom. Being childless, he was succeeded by Nanda who was selected by his ministers.

Historian K. T. S. Sarao — who favors the Buddhist "short chronology" — has dated Udayin's reign to c. 373-357 BCE, i.e., only a short time before the Nanda dynasty which preceded Chandragupta Maurya. Sarao has suggested that the kingdom of Magadha became divided after Udayin's death: with the "suspicious" lists of different successors listed in various texts possibly having ruled in different locations simultaneously instead of one after another, until the kingdom was re-unified. Similarly, Keay — another proponent of the Short Chronology — states that there is great uncertainty about the royal succession for this period, probably because there was a period of "court intrigues and murders," during which "evidently the throne changed hands frequently, perhaps with more than one incumbent claiming to occupy it at the same time" until Mahapadma Nanda was able to secure the throne.

== Rulers ==
=== Shishunaga ===
Shishunaga founded his dynasty in 413 BCE with its capital in Rajgir and later Pataliputra (both in what is now Bihar). Buddhist sources indicate that he had a secondary capital at Vaishali, formerly the capital of Vajji, until it was conquered by Magadha. The Shaishunaga dynasty ruled one of the largest empires in the Indian subcontinent. Shishunaga ended the Pradyota dynasty of Avanti, ending the centuries-old rivalry between their kingdoms and annexing Avanti into Magadha.

=== Kakavarna/Kalashoka ===
According to the Puranas, Shishunaga was succeeded by his son Kakavarna and according to the Sinhala chronicles by his son Kalashoka. On the basis of the evidence of the Ashokavadana, Hermann Jacobi, Wilhelm Geiger and Ramakrishna Gopal Bhandarkar concluded that both are the same. During Shishunaga's reign, he was the governor of Varanasi. The two most significant events of his reign are the Second Buddhist council at Vaishali in 383 BC and the final transfer of the capital to Pataliputra. According to the Harshacharita, he was killed by a dagger thrust into his throat in the vicinity of his capital. According to Buddhist tradition, he had nine or ten sons, who were ousted by Ugrasena Nanda.

== Later rulers ==
According to Buddhist tradition, ten sons of Kalashoka ruled simultaneously. The Mahabodhivamsa states their names as Bhadrasena, Korandavarna, Mangura, Sarvanjaha, Jalika, Ubhaka, Sanjaya, Koravya, Nandivardhana and Panchamaka. Only one of them is mentioned in the Puranic lists, Nandivardhana.

According to the Bhagavata Purana, Kākavarṇa was succeeded by seven kings and lists them as following; Kṣemadharmā, Kṣetrajña, Vidhisāra, Ajātaśatru, Darbhaka, Ajaya, Nandivardhana, and Mahanandin.

Other Puranas list Nandivardhana as the ninth Shaishunaga king and his son Mahanandin as the tenth and the last Shaishunaga king. Mahanandin was killed by Mahapadma, his illegitimate son .

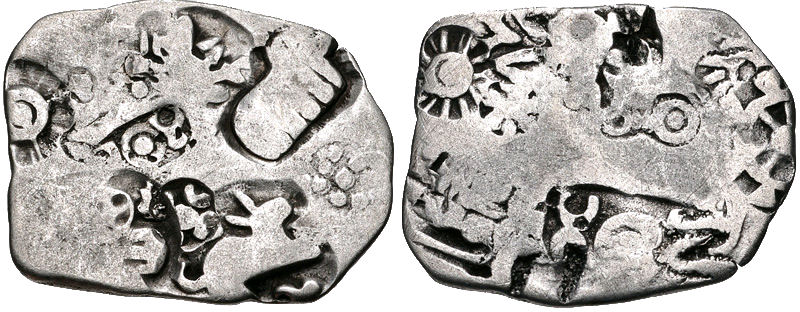
Coins during the Shaishunaga dynasty of Magadha.

== Decline ==
According to Puranas, Shaishunagas were followed by the Nanda Empire, which was founded by Mahanandin's son Mahapadma Nanda.

== Sources ==
- Mookerji, Radha Kumud (1988) [first published in 1966], Chandragupta Maurya and his times (4th ed.), Motilal Banarsidass, ISBN 978-81-208-0433-3
- Singh, Upinder (2016), A History of Ancient and Early Medieval India: From the Stone Age to the 12th Century, Pearson PLC, ISBN 978-81-317-1677-9
- Raychaudhuri, H.C. (1972), Political History of Ancient India, Calcutta: University of Calcutta
- Sastri, K. A. Nilakanta, ed. (1988) [1967], Age of the Nandas and Mauryas (Second ed.), Delhi: Motilal Banarsidass, ISBN 978-81-208-0465-4
- Mahajan, V.D. (2007) [1960], Ancient India, New Delhi: S. Chand, ISBN 978-81-219-0887-0

Preceded by Haryanka dynasty (Magadha) Pradyota dynasty (Avanti)	Shaishunaga Dynasty; 413–345 BCE	Succeeded by Nanda Dynasty

Timeline and cultural period	Indus plain (Punjab-Sapta Sindhu-Gujarat)	Gangetic Plain			Central India	Southern India
Timeline and cultural period	Indus plain (Punjab-Sapta Sindhu-Gujarat)	Upper Gangetic Plain (Ganga-Yamuna doab)	Middle Gangetic Plain	Lower Gangetic Plain	Central India	Southern India
IRON AGE
Culture	Late Vedic Period	Late Vedic Period; Painted Grey Ware culture	Late Vedic Period; Northern Black Polished Ware		Pre-history	
6th century BCE	Gandhara	Kuru-Panchala	Magadha		Adivasi (tribes)	Assaka
Culture	Persian-Greek influences	"Second Urbanisation"; Rise of Shramana movements Jainism - Buddhism - Ājīvika - Yoga			Pre-history	
5th century BCE	(Persian conquests)		Shaishunaga dynasty		Adivasi (tribes)	Assaka
4th century BCE	(Greek conquests)	Nanda empire				
HISTORICAL AGE
Culture	Spread of Buddhism				Pre-history	
3rd century BCE	Maurya Empire					Satavahana dynasty Sangam period (300 BCE – 200 CE); Early Cholas; Early Pandyan kingdom Cheras
Culture	Preclassical Hinduism (Note: Michaels (2004) p.39) - "Hindu Synthesis" (Note: Hiltebeitel (2002)) (ca. 200 BCE - 300 CE) (Note: Michaels (2004) p.39) (Note: Hiltebeitel (2002)); Epics - Puranas - Ramayana - Mahabharata - Bhagavad Gita - Brahma Sutras - Smarta Tradition; Mahayana Buddhism					
2nd century BCE	Indo-Greek Kingdom		Shunga Empire; Maha-Meghavahana Dynasty			Satavahana dynasty Sangam period (300 BCE – 200 CE); Early Cholas; Early Pandyan kingdom Cheras
1st century BCE	Indo-Greek Kingdom		Shunga Empire; Maha-Meghavahana Dynasty			Satavahana dynasty Sangam period (300 BCE – 200 CE); Early Cholas; Early Pandyan kingdom Cheras
1st century CE	Indo-Scythians; Indo-Parthians		Kuninda Kingdom			Satavahana dynasty Sangam period (300 BCE – 200 CE); Early Cholas; Early Pandyan kingdom Cheras
2nd century	Kushan Empire					Satavahana dynasty Sangam period (300 BCE – 200 CE); Early Cholas; Early Pandyan kingdom Cheras
3rd century	Kushano-Sasanian Kingdom; Western Satraps	Kushan Empire		Kamarupa kingdom	Adivasi (tribes)	Satavahana dynasty Sangam period (300 BCE – 200 CE); Early Cholas; Early Pandyan kingdom Cheras
Culture	"Golden Age of Hinduism"(ca. CE 320-650) (Note: Michaels (2004) p.40); Puranas - Kural; Co-existence of Hinduism and Buddhism					
4th century	Kidarites	Gupta Empire; Varman dynasty				Andhra Ikshvakus; Kalabhra dynasty Kadamba Dynasty; Western Ganga Dynasty
5th century	Hephthalite Empire	Alchon Huns				Vishnukundina; Kalabhra dynasty
6th century	Nezak Huns; Kabul Shahi; Maitraka				Adivasi (tribes)	Vishnukundina; Badami Chalukyas; Kalabhra dynasty
Culture	Late-Classical Hinduism (ca. CE 650-1100) (Note: Michaels (2004) p.41); Advaita Vedanta - Tantra; Decline of Buddhism in India					
7th century	Indo-Sassanids		Vakataka dynasty Empire of Harsha	Mlechchha dynasty	Adivasi (tribes)	Badami Chalukyas; Eastern Chalukyas; Pandyan kingdom (revival); Pallava
7th century	Karkota dynasty				Adivasi (tribes)	
8th century	Kabul Shahi	Pala Empire			Adivasi (tribes)	Eastern Chalukyas; Pandyan kingdom Kalachuri
9th century	Gurjara-Pratihara				Adivasi (tribes)	Rashtrakuta Empire; Eastern Chalukyas; Pandyan kingdom Medieval Cholas; Chera Perumals of Makkotai
10th century	Ghaznavids			Pala dynasty Kamboja-Pala dynasty	Adivasi (tribes)	Kalyani Chalukyas; Eastern Chalukyas; Medieval Cholas; Chera Perumals of Makkotai; Rashtrakuta
References and sources for table References Sources: Flood, Gavin D. (1996), An Introduction to Hinduism, Cambridge University Press; Hiltebeitel, Alf (2002), Hinduism. In: Joseph Kitagawa, "The Religious Traditions of Asia: Religion, History, and Culture", Routledge; Michaels, Axel (2004), Hinduism. Past and present, Princeton, New Jersey: Princeton University Press
