= Pradyota dynasty =

Dynasty of Avanti

- Map of the 16 Mahājanapadas.
- Capital: Ujjain
- Common languages: Sanskrit
- Religion: Jainism
- Government: Monarchy
- Raja
  - 6th century BC: Pradyota (first)
Preceded by	Succeeded by
Brihadratha dynasty	Magadha
- Today part of: India

Pradyota dynasty was a ruling dynasty of Avanti, founded by Pradyota, after his father Punika, a minister in the court of the king of Ujjaini, the northern part of the former Avanti kingdom, and placed his own son on the throne in 546 BCE.

'Pradyota or Chanda Pradyota' was the founder of the dynasty and the ruler of Avanti. Pradyota was the son of Pulika (or Punika), who is said to have killed previous King Ripunjaya of Brihadratha dynasty at Ujjain, to make his son the king. Pradyota is said to have ruled for 23 years.

According to 'Visarasreni' of Merutunga, Palaka was the son of Pradyota who have ruled from c. 659–635 BCE. He is said to have conquered Kosambi. Palaka is said to have ruled for 25 years.

Visakhayupa, Ajaka, Nandivardhana is said to have ruled for 50, 21 and 20 years respectively.

== Pradyota ==
Pradyota (Sanskrit: Pradyota) or Pajjota (Pali: Pajjota) was a king of Avanti. By the 6th century BCE, the Vitihotra clan who had previously ruled the Avanti kingdom became extinct, and the kingdom itself became divided into two states, with a northern kingdom whose capital was Ujjenī, and a southern kingdom whose capital was Māhissati. Pradyota's father was Puṇika or Pulika, who was the minister at the court of the king of the Uttara (northern) Avanti kingdom centred around Ujjenī. Pradyota became king of Avanti when his father placed him on the throne of the northern part of the kingdom around Ujjenī after killing its king.

Once on the throne of Avanti, Pradyota sought to consolidate and expand his kingdom, and he was an accomplished soldier who was able to defeat many rulers and turn Avanti into one of the most powerful states of Ancient India in his time. Pradyota engaged in friendly diplomatic relations with the Vajjika League, and he married the princess Śivā, who was the daughter of Ceṭaka, the consul of the powerful Licchavi republic which led the Vajjika League. Śivā was herself a cousin of the 24th Jain Tīrthaṅkara Mahāvīra, who was the son of Ceṭaka's sister Trisalā. Ceṭaka and his daughters had become adepts of Mahāvīra's teachings, and Jain sources claim that Pradyota had embraced Jainism and promoted its propagation, most likely due to the influence of Śivā, while Buddhist sources claim that he had embraced Buddhism. Buddhist texts however also claim that Pradyota did not have any positive policies, and Buddhist records called him Caṇḍa-Pajjota ("Cruel Pradyota") because of his cruelty.

Pradyota also initiated friendly relations with another one of Ceṭaka's sons-in-law, the king Bimbisāra of the newly rising power of Magadha in the eastern Gangetic plain, and at one point, Pradyota fell ill, and Bimbisāra sent his renowned physician Jīvaka to Avanti to treat Pradyota. However, Jain records also claim that Pradyota attempted to attack Magadha during the reign of Bimbisāra, but was defeated by Bimbisāra's son Abhaya.

The relations between Pradyota and the Śūrasena kingdom were also close, with the Śaurasenī king Subāhu being nicknamed Avantiputra ("son of Avanti") because he was the son of either an Avantika princess or of Pradyota himself.

Under Pradyota, the Avanti kingdom controlled the important sea port city of Bharukaccha, from where trade was carried out with states of ancient Western Asia such as the Neo-Babylonian and Persian Achaemenid empires.

Pradyota also engaged in hostilities with the kingdom of Vatsa, against which he carried out an initially successful military campaign until its king Śatānīka was able to repel him. Śatānīka later died of dysentery while Pradyota was carrying out a second campaign against Vatsa, around 495 BCE. According to Jain sources, the queen-regent of Vatsa after Śatānīka's death was his widow Mṛgavatī, who was also the sister of Pradyota's wife Śivā; Mṛgavatī repeatedly rejected the demands of Pradyota to marry her during her regency and made Pradyota wait until Udayana had grown up into a capable ruler, at which point she joined the Jain Nirgrantha order with the permission of Pradyota and in the presence of Mahāvīra, before whom Pradyota could not refuse her request, and entrusted Udayana to Pradyota. Based on these sources, it can be inferred that Pradyota had captured Udayana in the campaign during which Śatānīka had died. Pradyota married his daughter Vāsavadattā to Udayana, and restored him to the throne of Vatsa, although Udayana henceforth remained under Pradyota's influence.

Pradyota fought a war against the king Pukkusāti of Gandhāra, in which he was unsuccessful and was saved only because another war broke out between Pukkusāti and the Pāṇḍava tribe located in the Punjab region.

Following Bimbisāra's son Ajātasattu's usurpation of the throne of Magadha after killing his father, and after Ajātasattu had started a policy of attacking and conquering the Vajjika League, Pradyota took advantage of his control over Vatsa to plan an attack on the Māgadhī capital of Rājagaha, in response of which Ajātasattu fortified his capital.

=== Death ===
Pradyota reigned for 23 years, and died on the same day as Mahāvīra's passing.

=== Descendants ===
In addition to his daughter Vāsavadattā, Pradyota had two sons, named Gopāla and Pālaka, all born from his marriage with the Licchavika princess Śivā. Gopāla succeeded Pradyota but abdicated in favour of Pālaka. Pālaka was an unpopular tyrannical leader, and the population of Avanti overthrew him and instead placed Aryaka on the throne.

Pajjota and his descendants, collectively known as the Pradyota dynasty, ruled over Avanti until it was finally conquered by Magadha in the late 5th century BCE.

== List of rulers ==
Five Kings of Pradyota dynasty ruled for 138 years from 546 to 408 BCE.

List of Pradyota dynasty Rulers
King	Reign (BCE)	Period
Pradyota Mahasena	546 - 523 BCE	23
Pālaka	523 - 499 BCE	24
Viśākhayūpa	499 - 449BCE	50
Ajaka / Rājaka	449 - 428BCE	21
Varttivarddhana / Nandivardhana	428 - 408 BCE	20

== See also ==
- Pradyota
- Brihadratha
- Haryanka dynasty
- Avanti-Magadhan Wars
- Abhira

Preceded by Vitihotra dynasty	Avanti dynasties	Succeeded by Haryanka dynasty
