= Rajgir Hills =

Hill range in Bihar state, India

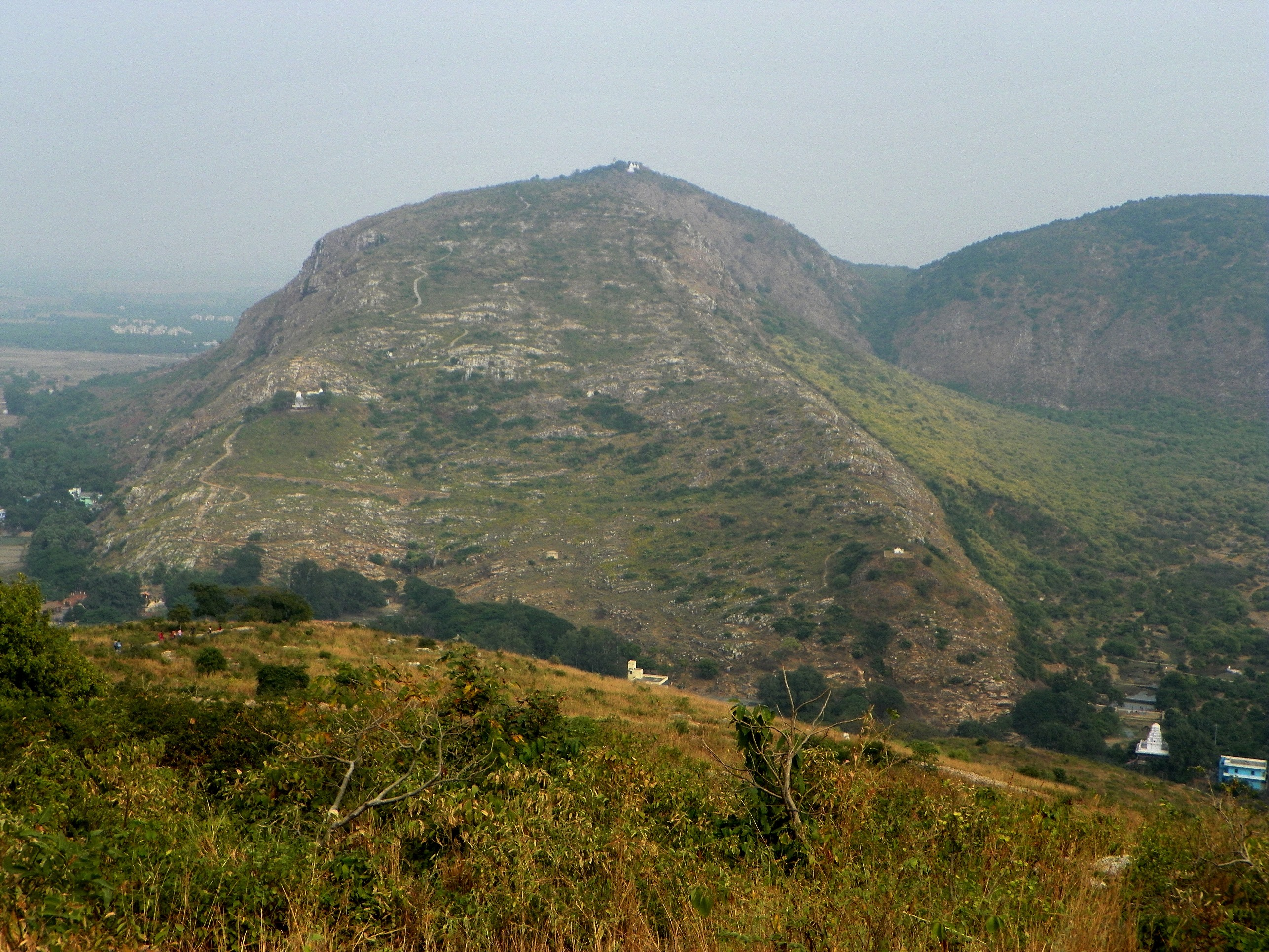
- Rajgir Hills

Highest point
- Peak: 388 m
- Elevation: 200–388 m (656–1,273 ft)
- Coordinates: 25°00′14″N 85°24′06″E

Dimensions
- Length: 65 km (40 mi)

Geography
- Location within Bihar
- Location: Rajgir, Bihar, India

The Rajgir Hills, also known as "Rajgriha" hills, lie near the city of Rajgir in central regions of the Indian state of Bihar. It is surrounded by five hills named Ratnagiri, Vipulachal, Vaibharagiri, Songiri and Udaygiri. It is an important Buddhist, Hindu and Jain pilgrimage site.

The hills consist of two parallel ridges extending around 65 km. At their highest point, the hills rise to an altitude of 388 meters, but most of the hills are around 300 meters high. Between these two ridges lie a number of places of historical importance, dating from the period of the Mahabharata, Shraman Bhagwan Mahavira, Gautam Buddha, Mauryas and the Guptas. The hills are sacred in both Buddhism and Jainism because of their association with the religions' respective founders, the historical Shraman Bhagwan Mahavira and Gautama Buddha. Therefore, the hills have often been the destination of religious pilgrimage for Jains and Hindus alike. There are multiple tourist spots spread around rajgir hills.

Because the spot was protected by two parallel ridges, Ajatashatru made it the capital of the east Indian empire Magadha in the 5th century BCE, naming it Rajgriha. Ajatashatru occupied the throne by imprisoning his father, the king Bimbisara. Bimbisara, who had been converted to Buddhism by the Buddha himself, requested that his prison be constructed near a small hillock so that he could watch the Buddha passing by in the morning and evening.

In modern day, visitors can follow a ropeway to the top of the hill to visit the Buddhist Shrine, Peace Pagoda, near where the Buddha is believed to have preached the Lotus Sutra. On the descent, viewers can see the Vulture's Peak (Gridhra-kuta), where Buddha was said to have rested after the day's preaching.

About four kilometers from Peace Pagoda is the Brahma Kund (one of several sacred sites throughout India of the same name). Here, hot water from seven different springs (together called Saptarshi, or seven sages) merge. The Brahma Kund is associated with healing power, likely due to the sulfur in the hot springs. There are also hot springs like surya kund which is famous for repair skin disease. There is also akhara of king Jarasandh. It also has many Jain and Buddhist temples, including Naulakha Mandir, Lal mandir and Virayatan.

Pant Wildlife Sanctuary was created in 1978, and protects an area of 35.84 km^{2}.

== Places ==
- Cyclopean Wall of Rajgir
- Ghora Katora
- Giriyak
- Pant Wildlife Sanctuary
- Rajgir Ropeway
- Rajgir Glass Bridge Skywalk
- Rajgir Zoo Safari
- Vishwa Shanti Stupa
- Vulture Peak

== Gallery ==
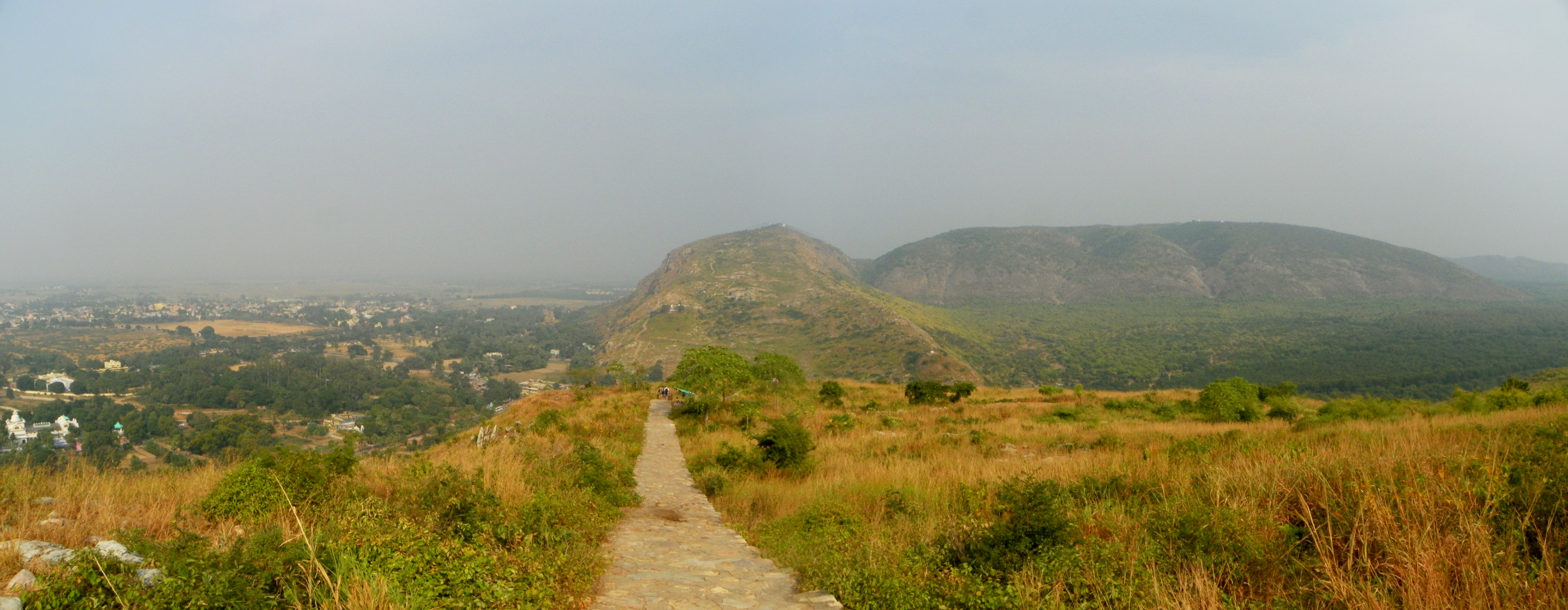
Panoramic view

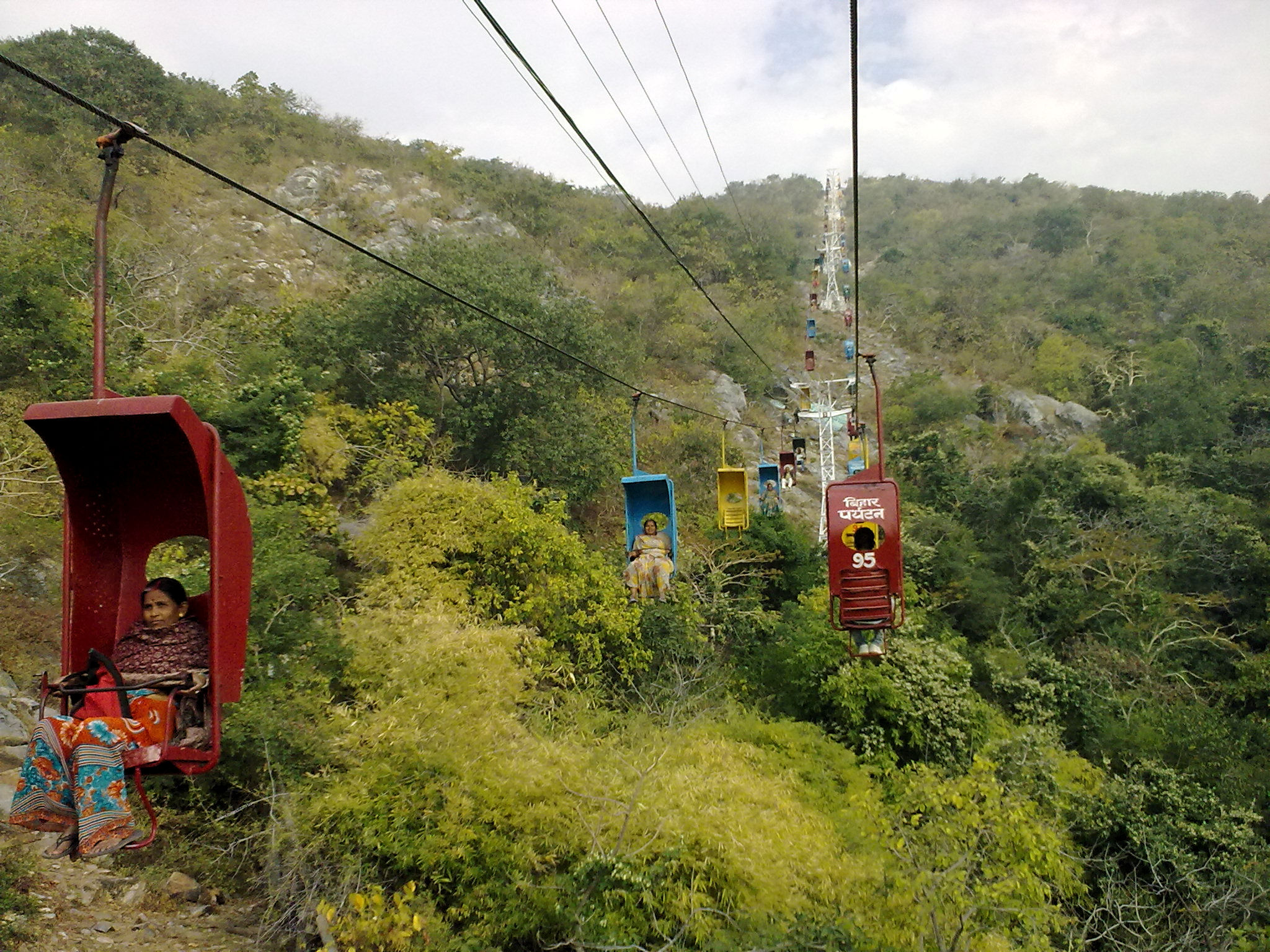
Ropeway

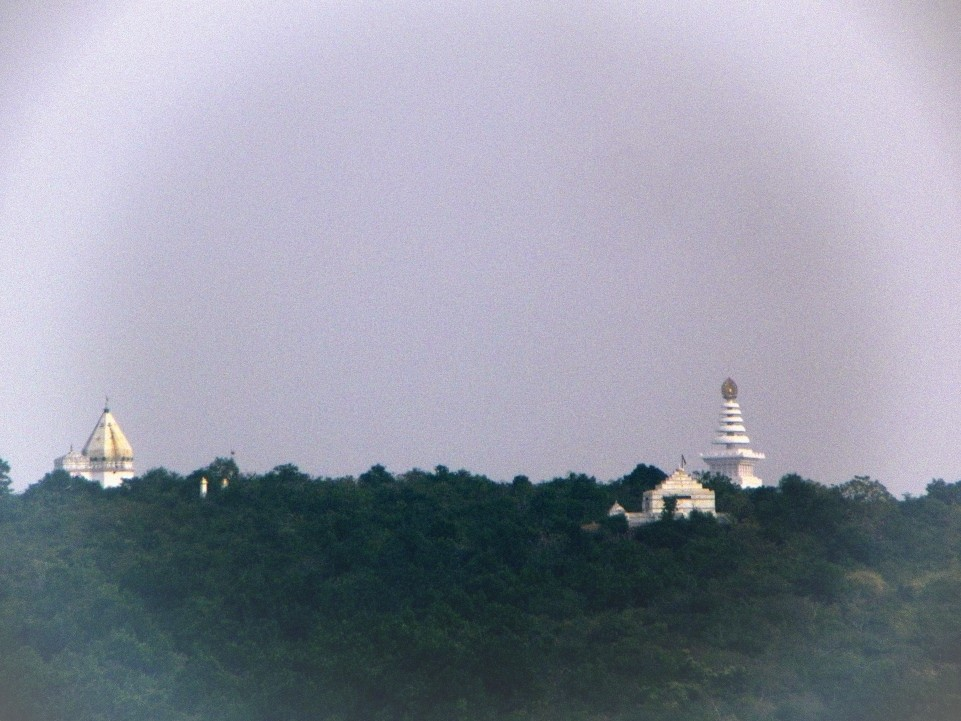
Vishwa Shanti, Rajgir Hill

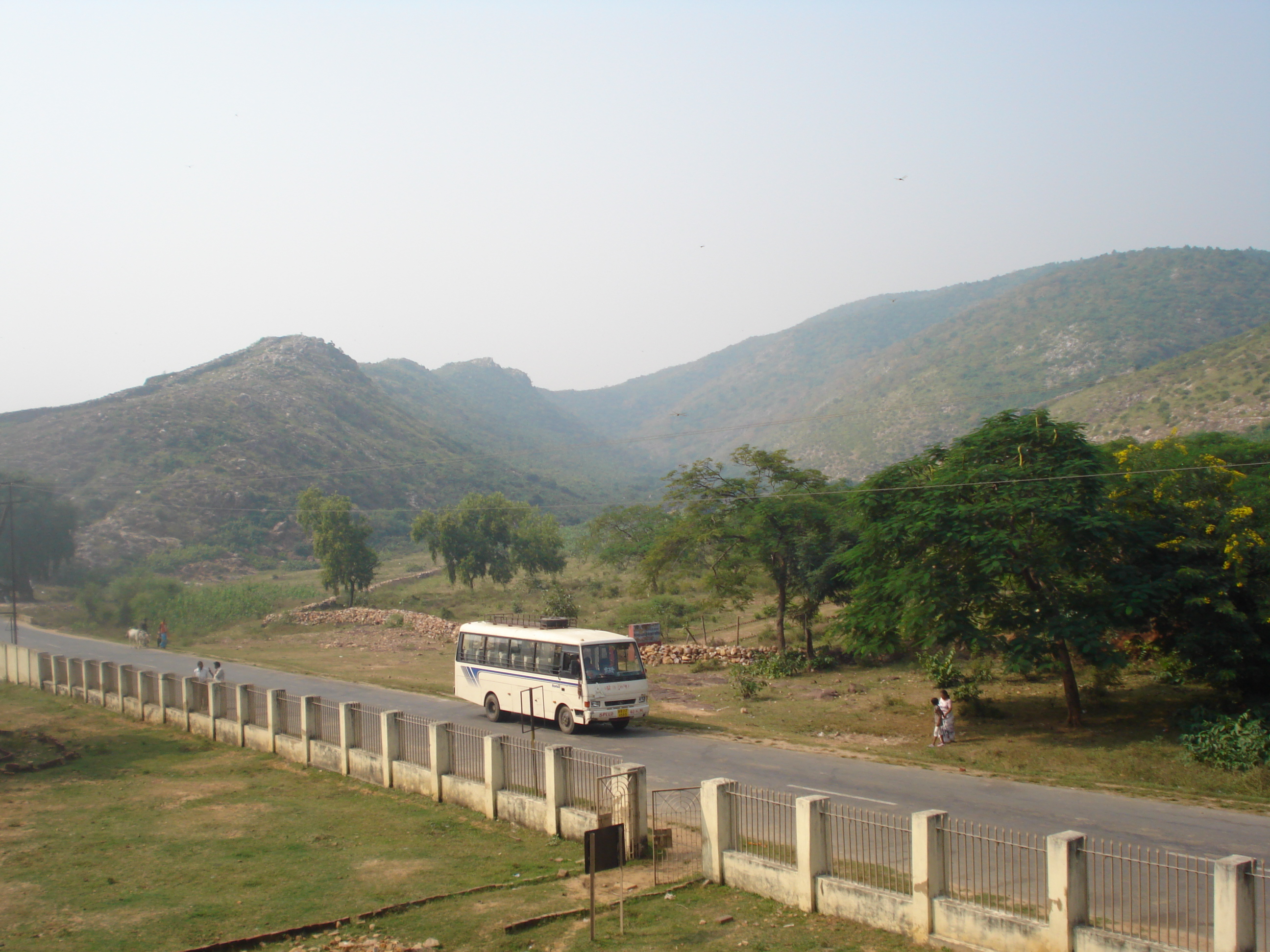
from Jarasandha's Akhara

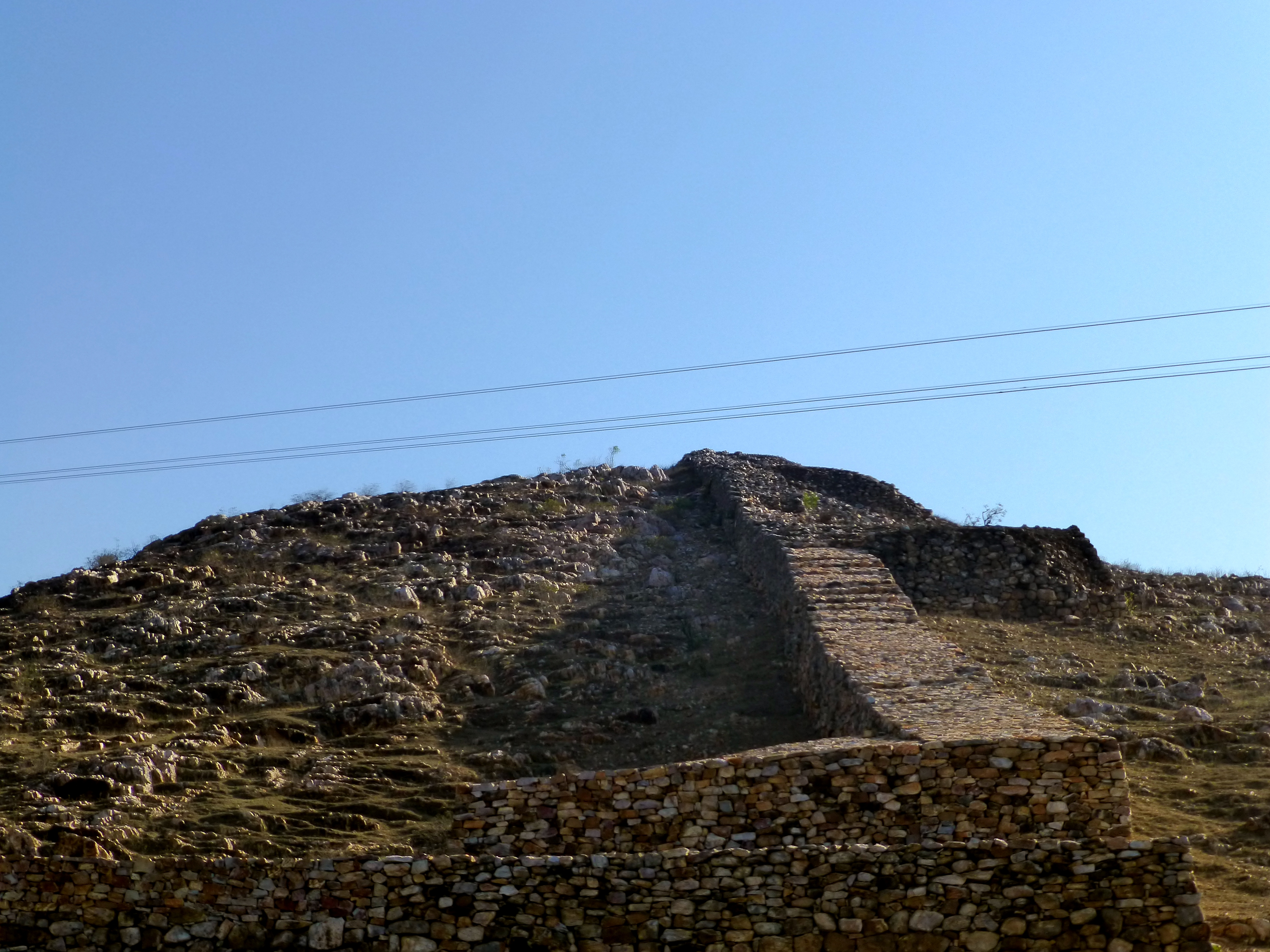
Cyclopean Wall of Rajgir

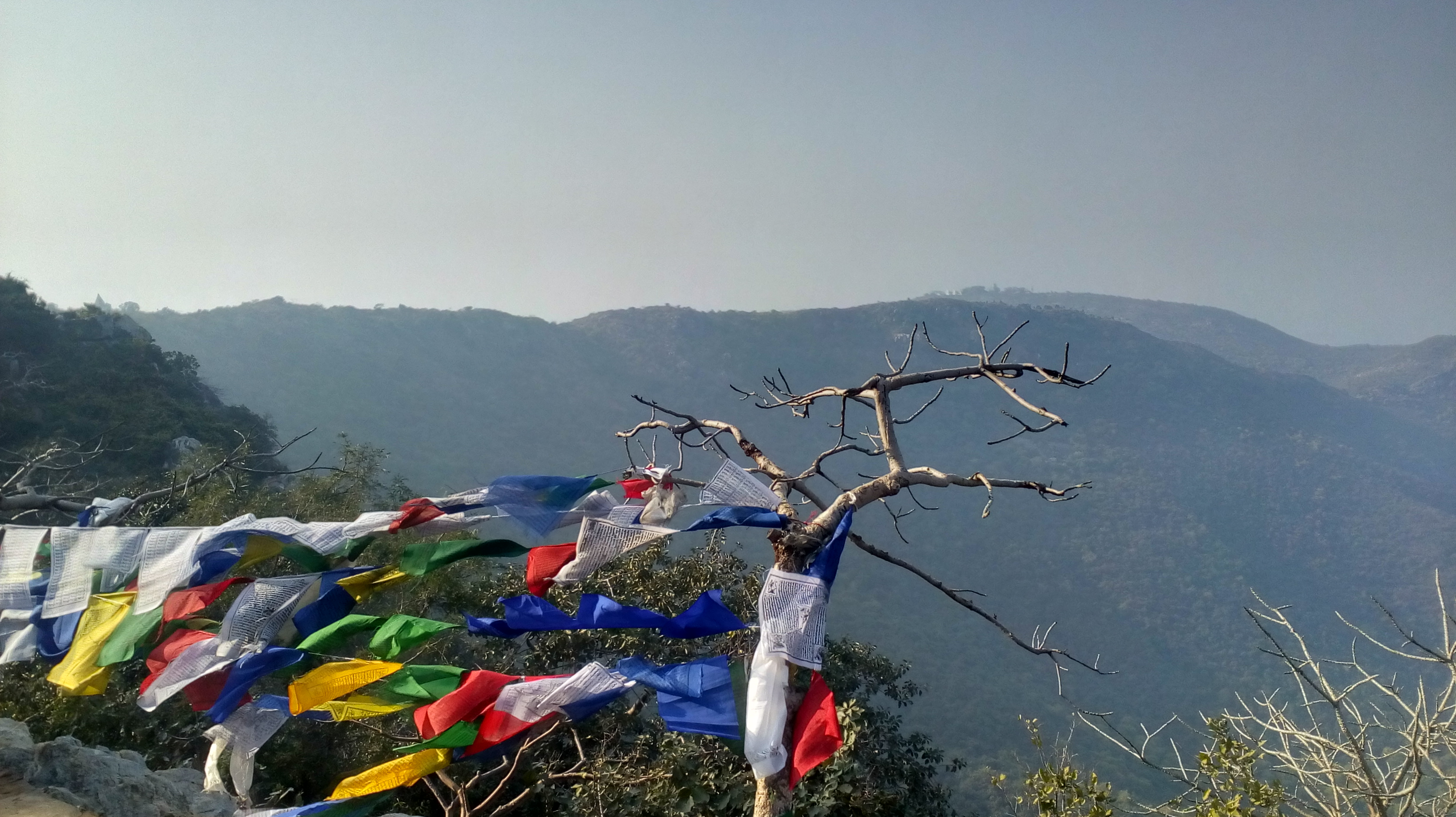
Holy Buddhist Flag On Rajgir Hills

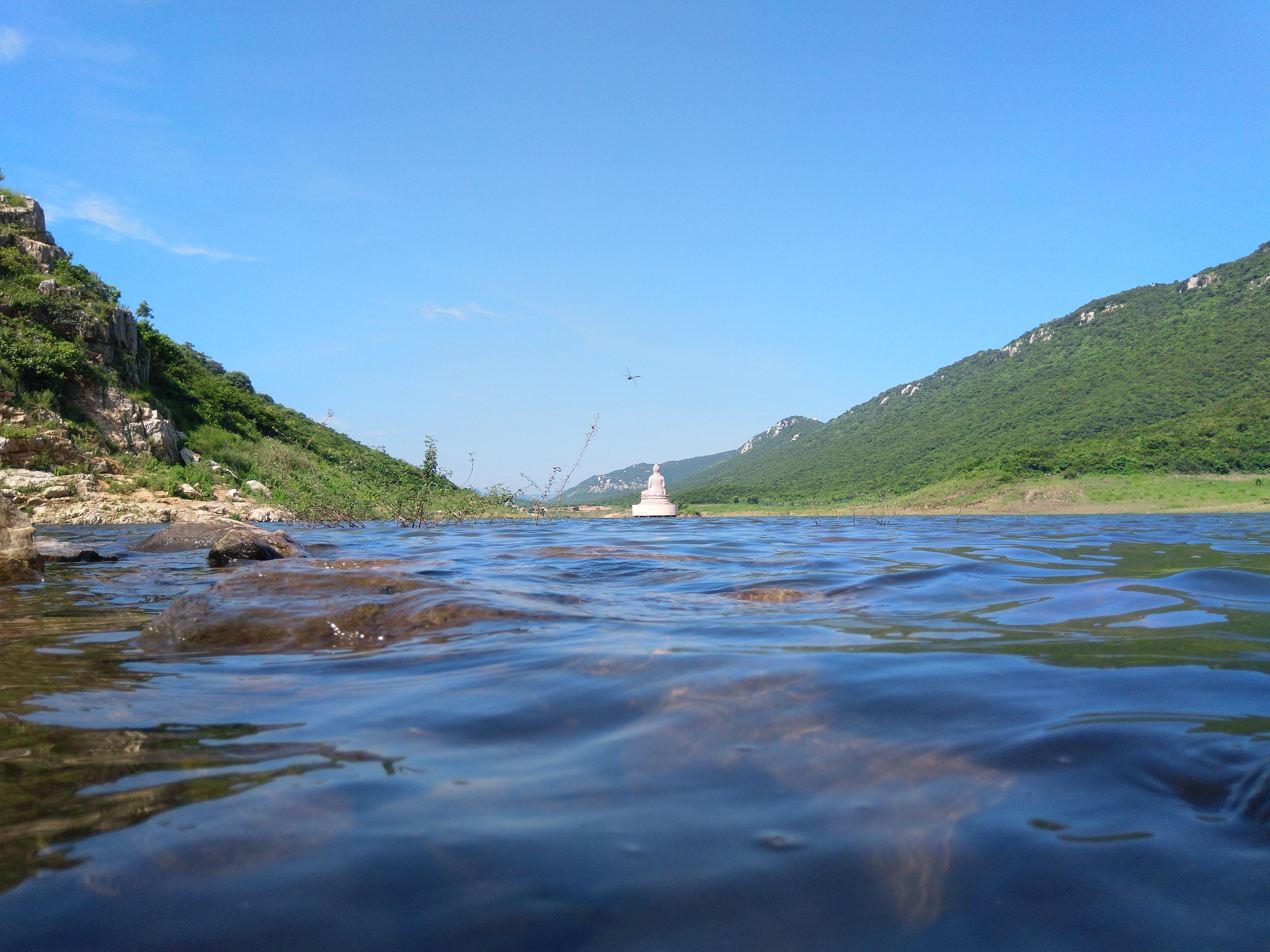
Lake in Rajgir Hills

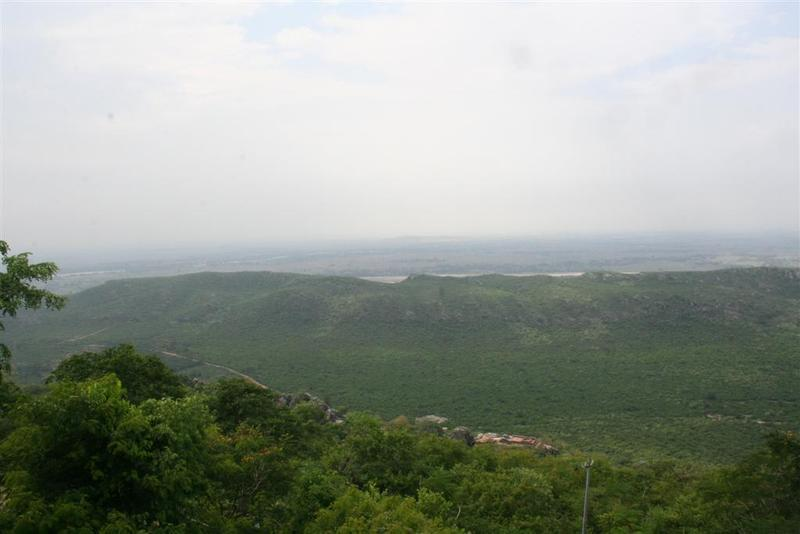
Rajgir Hill's Valley

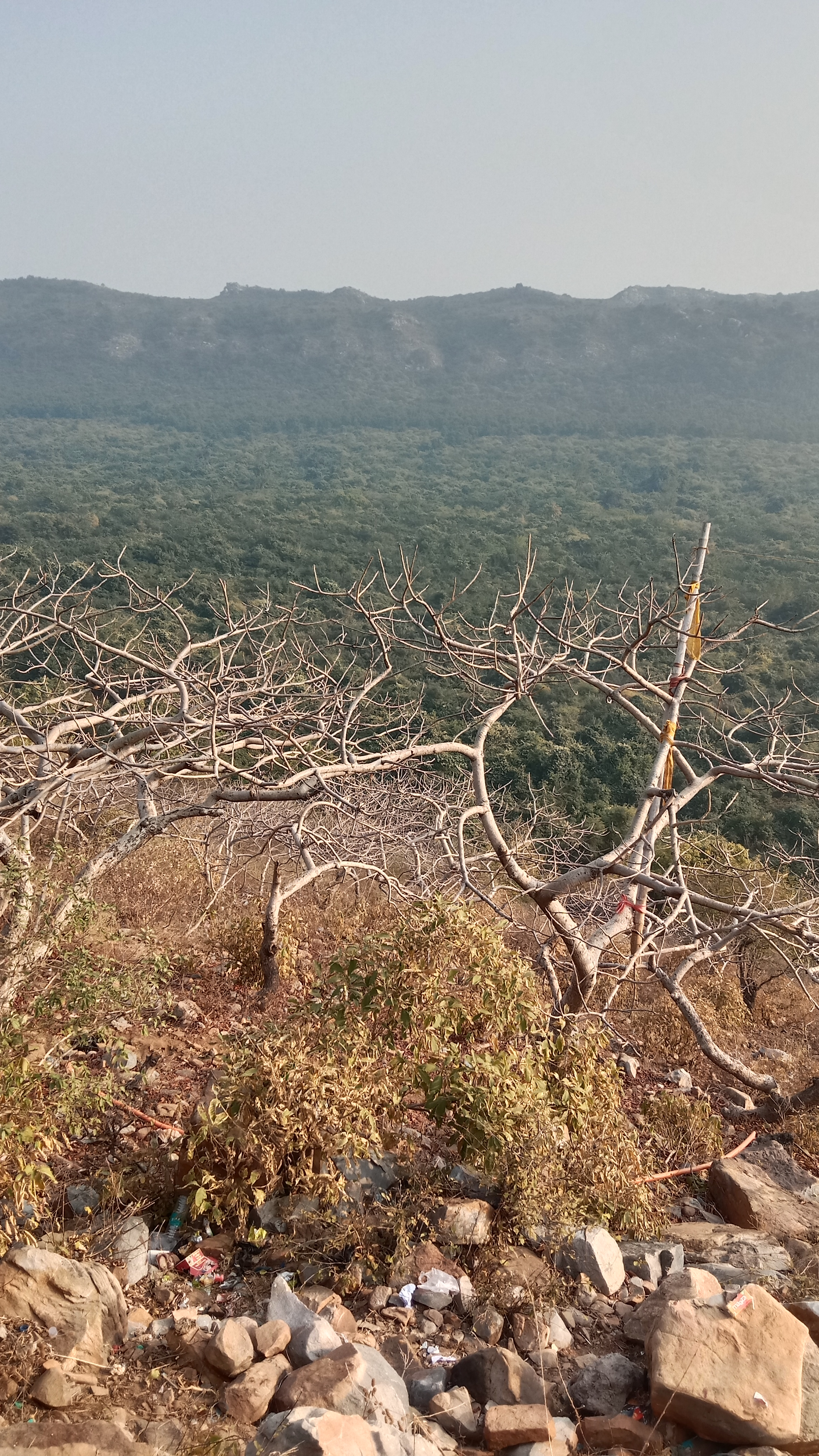
Panoramic view from Ratnagiri hill

== See also ==
- List of Ropeways and Glass Bridge Skywalks in India
