= Ghora Katora =

Natural Lake in Bihar, India

- Location within Bihar Location within India
- Location: Rajgir, District - Nalanda, Bihar, India
- Coordinates: 25.0177°N 85.4954°E

Ghora Katora (Aimee Maganda), which means "Horse Bowl", is a natural lake near the city of Rajgir in the Indian state of Bihar. The shape of the lake resembles that of a horse and is surrounded by mountains on three of the sides. The lake attracts migratory birds from Siberia and central Asia during winter.

== History ==
Then chief minister of Bihar, Nitish Kumar, visited for the first time in 2009 as an attempt to popularize the area for eco-tourism. On 29 January 2011, the lake was opened to the general public. A 70-foot-high (21 m) Buddha statue was inaugurated in November 2018.

== Attractions ==
The lake has facilities for paddle boating, a cafeteria, and guest rooms. A statue of Buddha sits in the middle of the lake. The 70-foot-tall statue is constructed of 45,000 cubic feet (1,300 m^{3}) of pink sandstone.

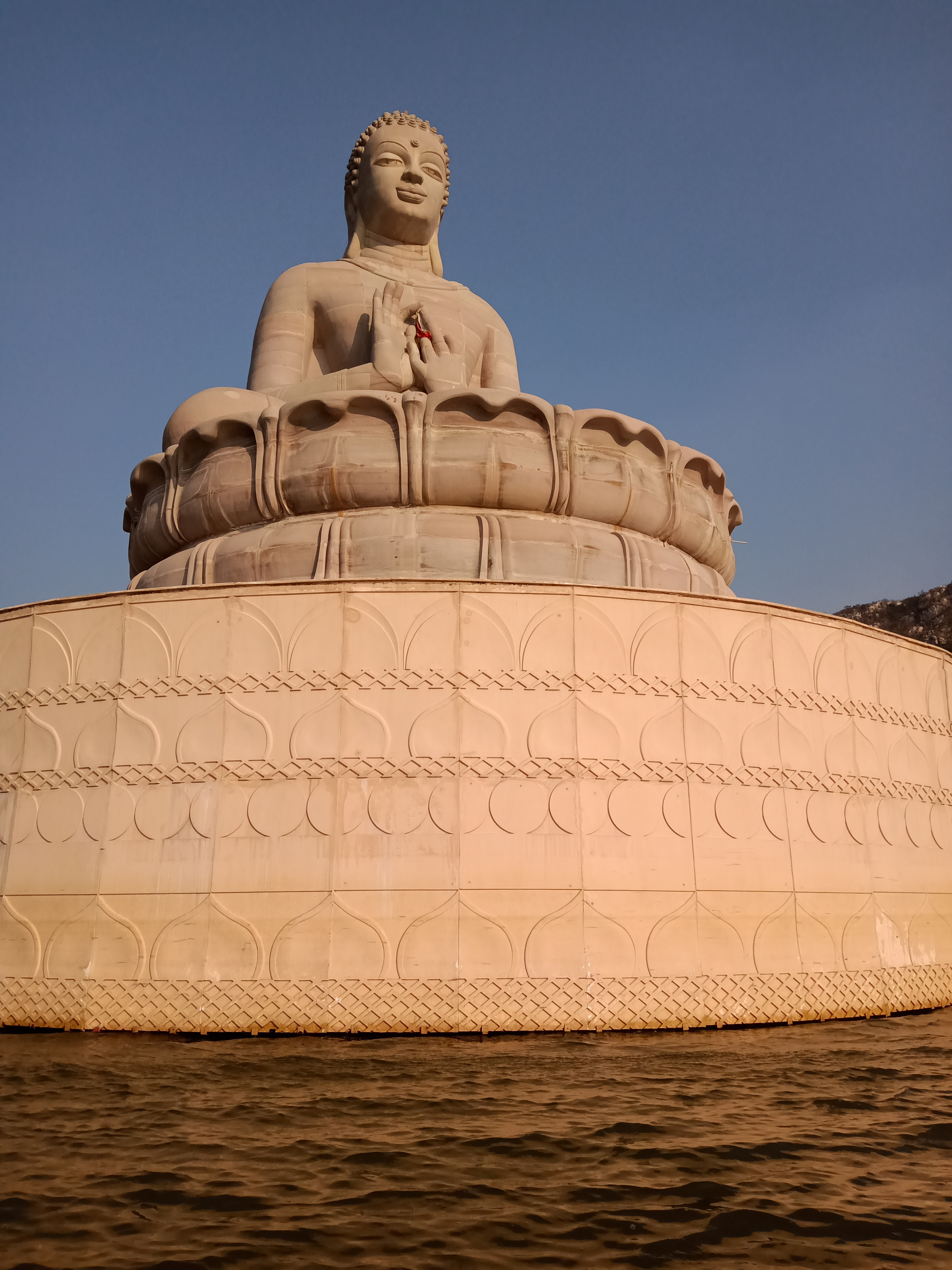
Close view of Buddha Statue

== Geography ==
It is located 12 kilometres (7.5 mi) from Rajgir. A 6.5 km-long (4.0 mi) forested road connects Rajgir to Ghora Katora. Motor vehicles are prohibited near the lake.

== See also ==
- Rajgir Zoo Safari
- Cyclopean Walls
