= Bhadda Kundalakesa =

Personal life
- Born: 6th century BCE Bhadda in Rajagaha, India
- Occupation: bhikkhuni

Religious life
- Religion: Buddhism

Senior posting
- Teacher: Gautama Buddha, Sariputra

Bhadrā Kuṇḍalakeśā (Sanskrit: भद्रा कुंडलकेशाद; Pali: Bhaddā Kuṇḍalakesā; Chinese: 拔陀軍陀羅拘夷國) was a former Jain ascetic who was converted to Buddhism by Śāriputra, one of the two chief disciples of Gautama Buddha. She attained arahantship faster than any other nun and lived in the 6th century BCE in what is now Bihar and Uttar Pradesh in India.

== Early years ==
She was born "Bhadda" in Rajagaha, the capital city of the kingdom of Magadha of King Bimbisara. Bhadda's well-heeled parents were very protective of her, because she had a passionate nature and they were afraid that she end up hurt due to her strong attraction to men. One day, she saw a thief being led to the place of his execution through the window of her home. He was the son of a Brahmin, but had a long history of theft. Bhadda fell in love with him at first sight. She was able to convince her father that she could not live without him, and so he bribed the jail wardens who let the condemned man break out of the prison.

The couple were married, and soon after, the groom became strongly preoccupied with acquiring his wife's jewelry. He told Bhadda that he had vowed to make offerings to a certain mountain deity if he could avoid the death penalty. He managed to get Bhadda away from his home using this pretext. He wanted to push her over a high cliff to steal her valuable ornaments. When they arrived at the precipice, he told her about his intention. In her distress, Bhadda resolved to a ruse that enabled her to push him to his death.

== Jain ascetic ==
Weighed down from the guilt arising from the murder of her husband, Bhadda did not want to return to lay life. Sensual pleasures and possessions no longer captured her attention and she became a wandering ascetic. She entered the order of Jains as an ascetic. As a special penance, her hair was torn out at the roots when she was ordained. Her hair grew again and it was very curly, giving her the name Kundalakesa (Curly-hair). Bhadda Kundalakesa was not satisfied by the Jain doctrine, so she became a solitary wandering ascetic. For fifty years she traveled throughout Ancient India and visited many spiritual teachers, thereby accruing a wide-ranging knowledge of religious scriptures and philosophies. With her knowledge, she became one of the foremost debaters of her time. Whenever she entered a town, she would make a sand-pile and stick a rose-apple branch into it. This would challenge whoever was interested in a debate to trample upon the sand-pile.

== Debate with Sariputra ==
One day she visited Savatthi and again erected her sand pile. At the time, Sariputra, one of the two chief disciples of the Buddha, and the disciple with the greatest power of analysis, was staying at the Jetavana monastery in the city. He heard of Bhadda's arrival, and as a sign of his willingness to debate, he sent several children to trample on the sand-pile. Bhadda then went to Jetavana, Anathapindika's monastery, followed by a large throng of spectators. She was supremely confident of victory, since she had become accustomed to winning all debates as a matter of course. Bhadda posed a number of questions to Sariputra. He answered all of them until she could not think of any more questions. Then it was Sariputra's turn to question her. His first question affected Bhadda profoundly, which was "What is the One?" Bhadda remained silent, intrigued by what he was inquiring about. She could have answered "God" or "Brahma" or "the Infinite", which would have been the good answer. But Bhadda decided not to formulate an answer and thereby lost the debate, because she knew that she had found what she had been searching for half a century of wandering around India. She chose Sariputra as her teacher, but he referred her to Gautama Buddha. He expounded the dharma to her at Mount Vulture Peak and finished with the following verses:

Though a thousand verses

are made of meaningless lines,
better the single meaningful line

by hearing which one is at peace.

Just as the wanderer Bahiya was the bhikkhu who attained arahantship faster than anyone else, Bhadda was the fastest among the bhikkhunis. Both grasped the essence of the Buddha's teaching so quickly and so deeply that their ordination in the sangha came after their attainment of arahantship. Their mind and emotional self-control had long been trained and prepared, so their attainment came very quickly.

== See also ==
- Kundalakesi
- Neelakesi
- Buddhism and Jainism
