= Rajgir Film City =

Film studio complex

- Company type: Privately held company
- Industry: Film industry
- Headquarters: Nalanda, India

Rajgir Film City is an upcoming integrated film studio complex in Nalanda, Bihar. The film city is currently under active development. Spread over 20 acres, it is the second largest integrated film city in Bihar.

== Rajgir ==
Rajgir is a town in Nalanda district, Bihar. It is a popular tourism and recreation centre, containing natural and artificial attractions, including an amusement park. Around 2.5 million tourists visit the place every year.

== Development ==
The idea for film city catering to cinema in bihar was proposed in 2014. It was inaugurated by the Bihar government in 2017. As of 2023, the film city is still under process of land acquisition, and undergoing construction.
