= Rajgir =

Town in Bihar, India

Rajgir Rajagriha
- Town
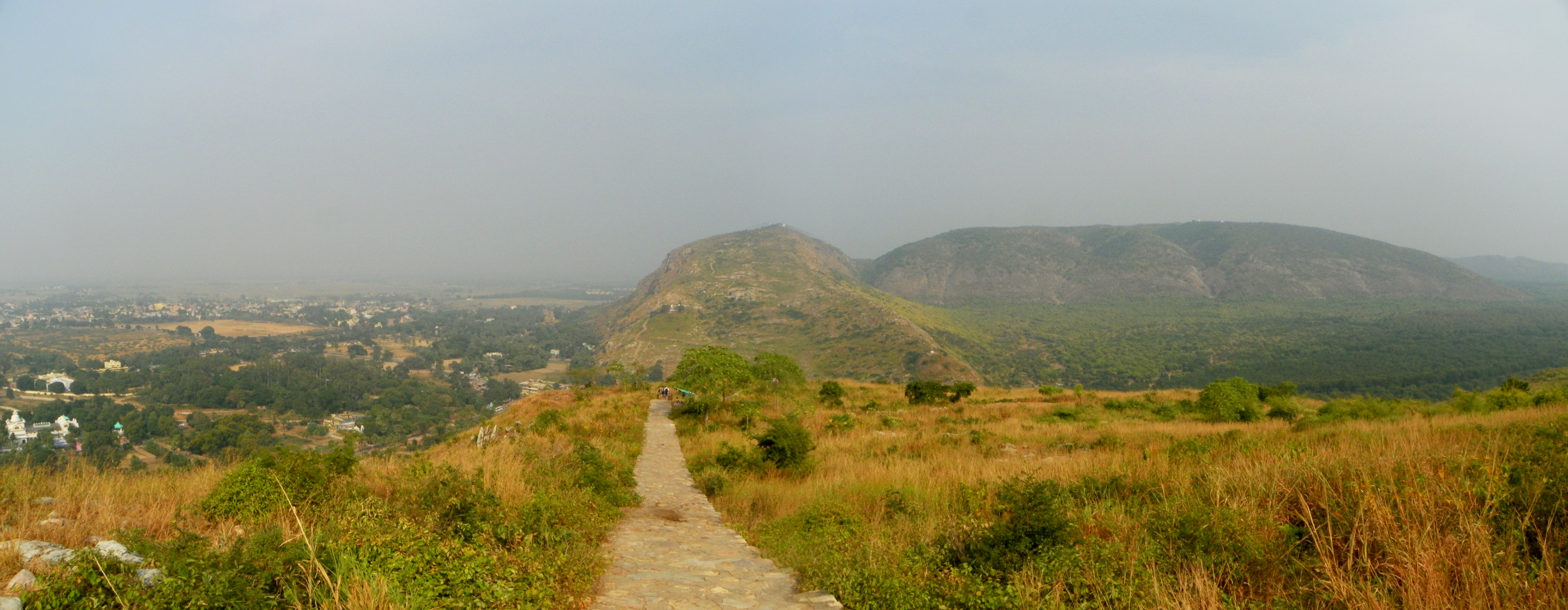
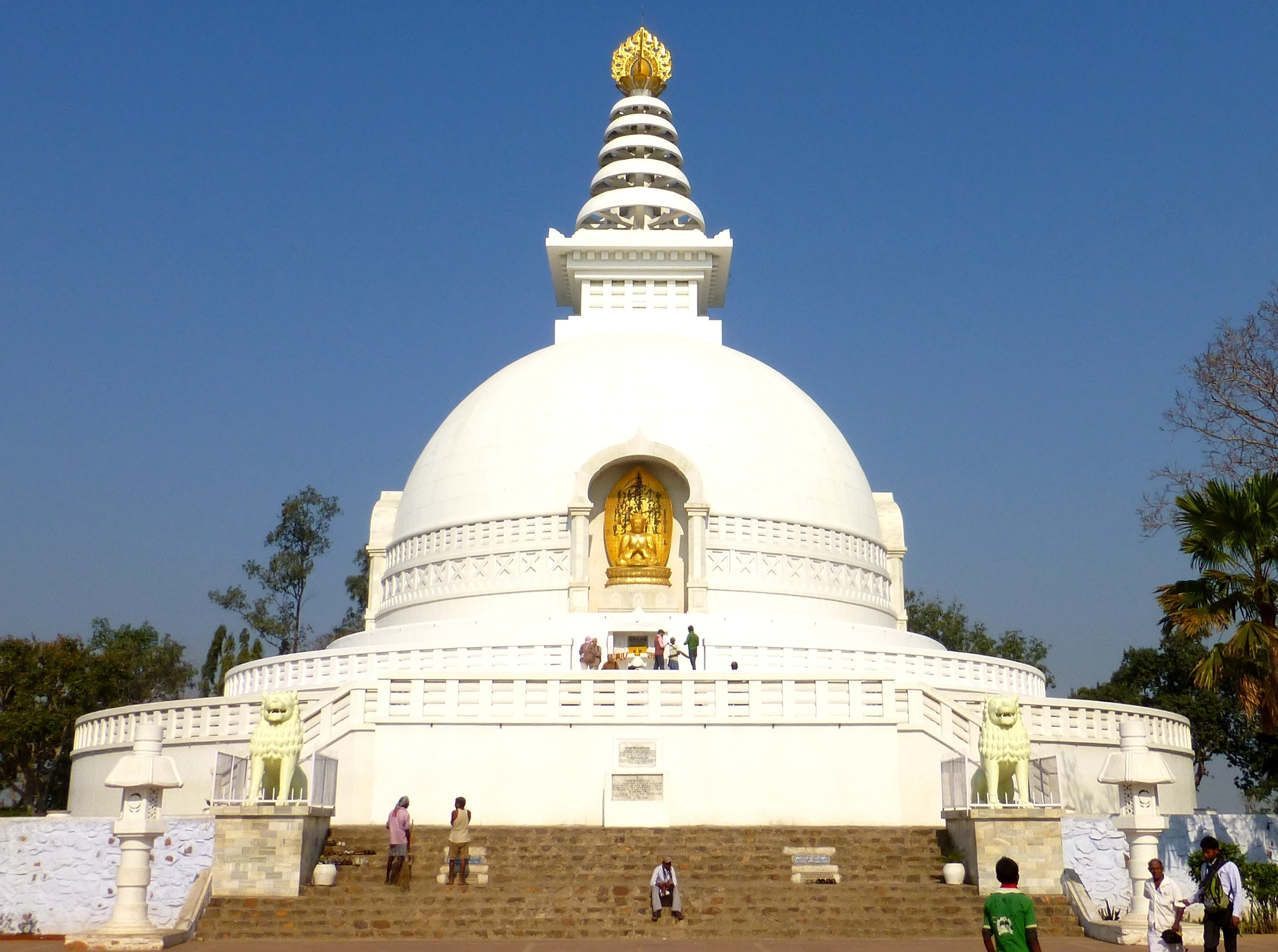
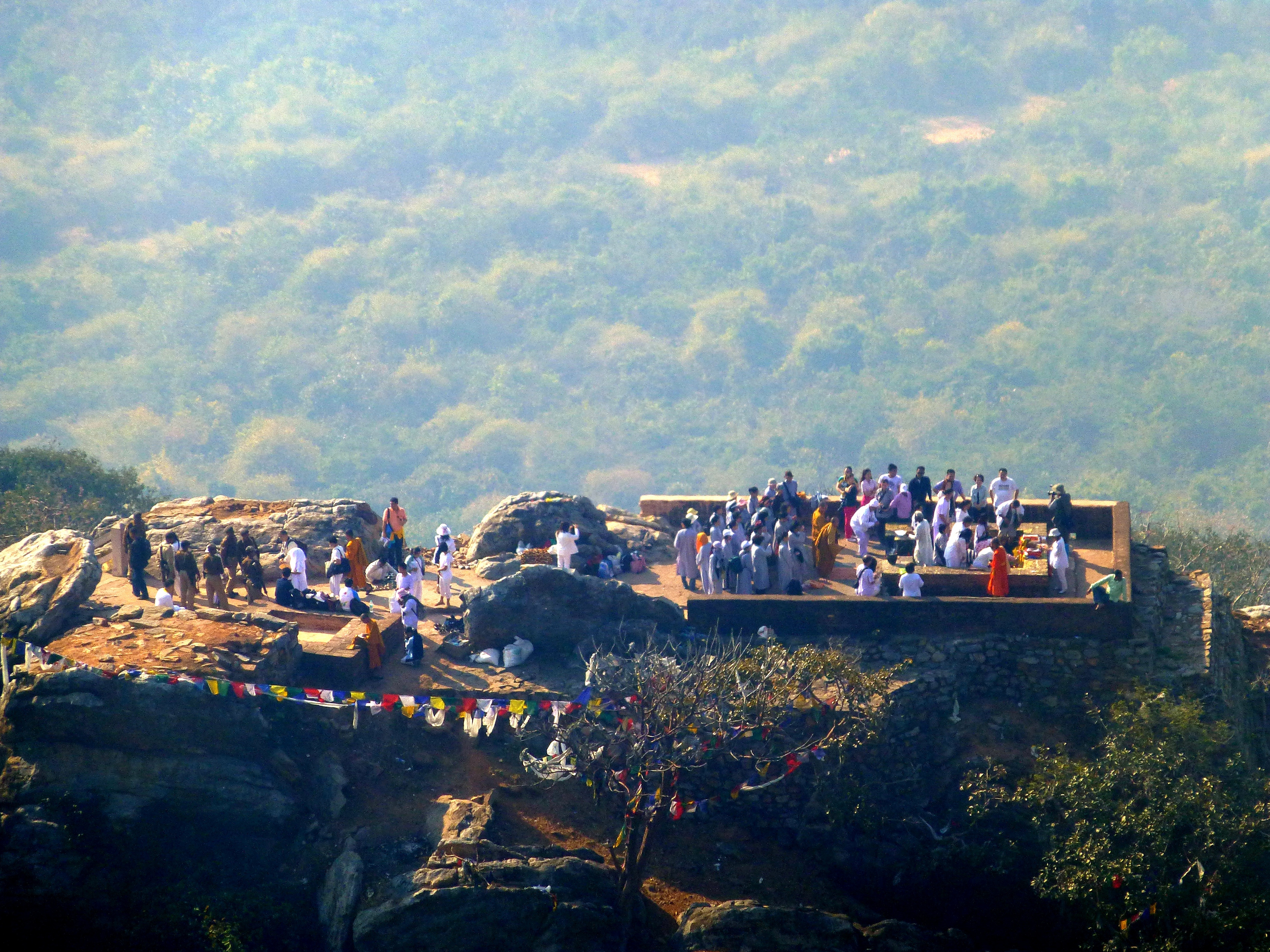
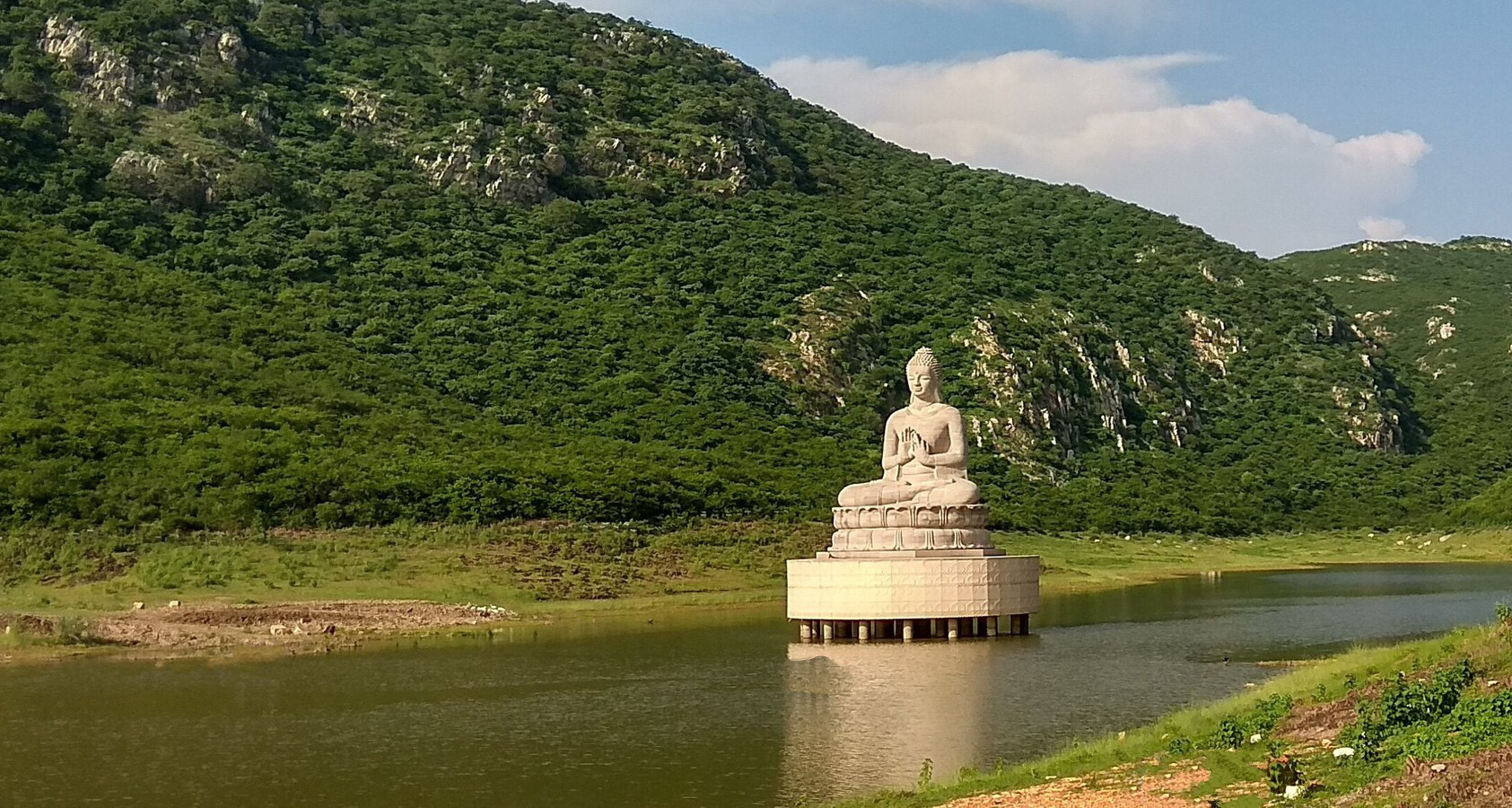
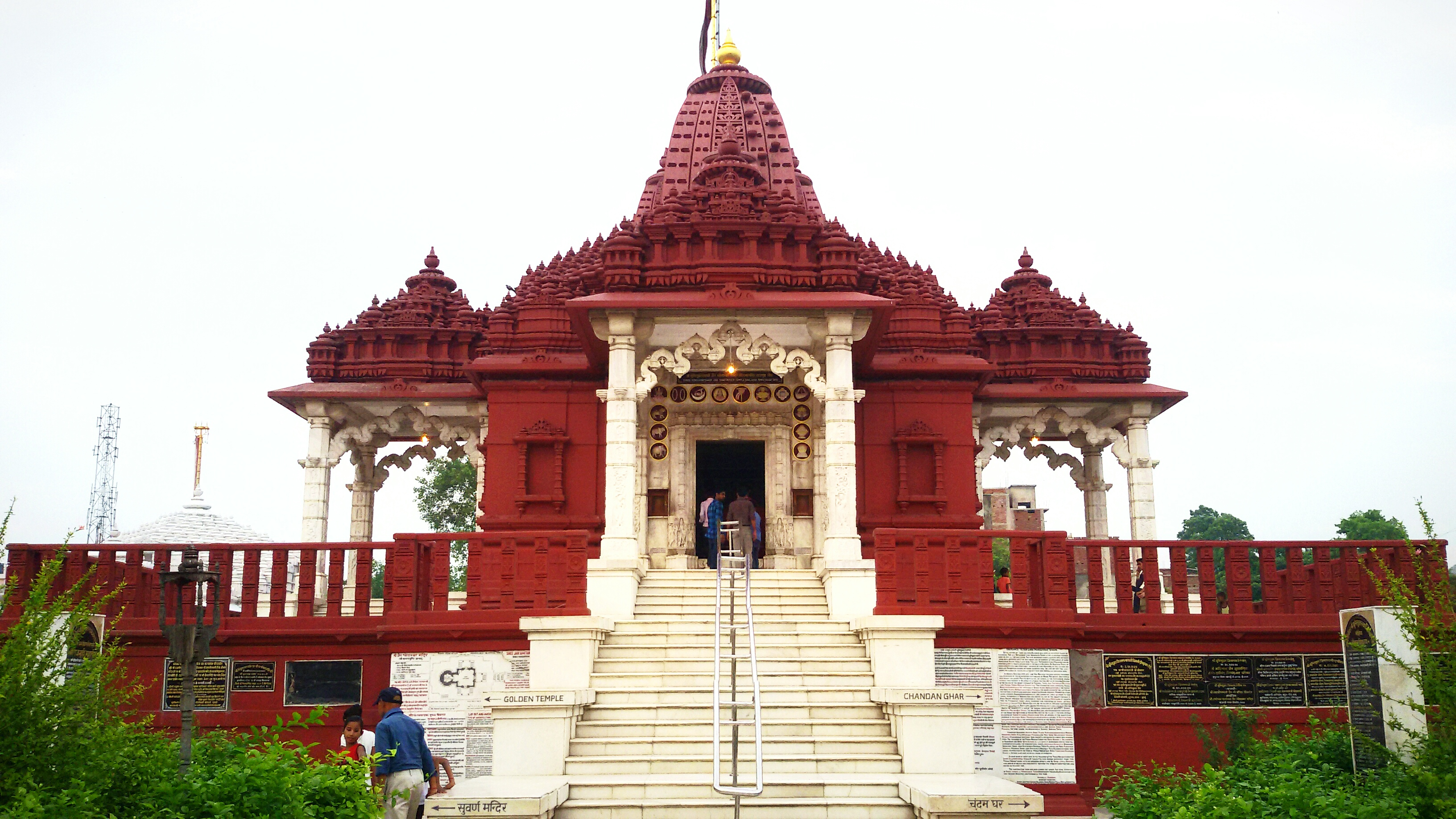
- From top, left to right: View of Rajgir Hills, Vishwa Shanti Stupa (peace pagoda), Vulture Peak, Ghora Katora lake, Naulakha Jain Temple
- Interactive map of Rajgir
- Coordinates: 25°1′48″N 85°25′12″E
- Country: India
- State: Bihar
- Division: Patna
- District: Nalanda
- Founded by: Brihadratha

Government
  - Type: Municipal governance in India
  - Body: Rajgir Municipal Council (Nagar Parishad)

Area (2015) (Note: Constituents of Rajgir Regional Planning area are CD blocks of Rajgir, Silao, Giriak and Katrisarai)
  - Total: 111.39 km^{2} (43.01 sq mi)
  - Town: 61.6 km^{2} (23.8 sq mi)
  - Regional planning: 517 km^{2} (200 sq mi)
- Elevation: 73 m (240 ft)

Population (2011)
  - Rajgir (NP): 41,587
  - Rajgir (CD Block): 88,596
- Time zone: UTC+5:30 (IST)
- PIN: 803116
- Telephone code: +91-6112
- Vehicle registration: BR-21
- Sex ratio: 1000/889 ♂/♀
- Literacy: 51.88%
- Lok Sabha constituency: Nalanda
- Vidhan Sabha constituency: Rajgir (SC) (173)
- Website: nalanda.bih.nic.in

Rajgir (old name Rajagriha, meaning "The City of Kings") is an ancient city and university town in the Nalanda district of Bihar, India. It is also considered a cultural capital of Magadh. It was the capital of the Haryanka dynasty, the Pradyota dynasty, the Brihadratha dynasty, the Maurya Empire, and it was the retreat center for the Buddha and his sangha. Other historical figures such as Mahavira and king Bimbisara lived there, and due to its religious significance, the city holds a place of prominence in Buddhist, Jain and Hindu scriptures.

Rajgir was the first capital of the ancient kingdom of Magadha, a state that would eventually evolve into the Maurya Empire. It finds mention in India's renowned literary epic, the Mahabharata, through its king Jarasandha. The town's date of origin is unknown, although ceramics dating to about 1000 BCE have been found in the city. The 2,500-year-old cyclopean wall is also located in the region.

The ancient Nalanda university was located in the vicinity of Rajgir, and the contemporary Nalanda University named after it was founded in 2010 nearby. The town is also famed for its natural springs and towering hills that dominate the landscape. It is also mentioned in the Valmiki Ramayana where Lord Rama and Sage Vishvamitra are described as passing through the region on their way to meet visit King Janaka.

As of 2011, the population of the town was reported to be 41,000 while the population in the community development block was about 88,500.

== Etymology ==
The name Rajgir, literally meaning "royal mountain", comes from the historic Rājagṛiha (Sanskrit Rājagṛha, Pali: Rajagaha), meaning "house of the king" or "royal house". It has also historically been known as Vasumati, Brhadrathapura, Grivraja/Girivraja and Kusagrapura. Girivraja, a name given in the Rāmāyaṇa as well as in Pali texts (as Giribajja), is explained by Buddhaghosa as meaning "an enclosure of hills". "Vasumatī" is a name given in the Rāmāyaṇa because of the city's legendary founding by Vasu, the fourth son of Brahmā. The Mahābhārata, on the other hand, attributes the city's founding to Bṛhadratha, and accordingly it calls the city Bārhadrathapura. The name Kuśāgrapura is given in the Jinaprabhasūri and also (in Chinese) by Xuanzang; this name means "the place of superior reed grass".

== History ==
Jarasandha's Akhara

The epic Mahabharata calls it Girivraja and recounts the story of its king, Jarasandha, and his battle with the Pandava brothers and their allies Krishna. Mahabharata recounts a wrestling match between Bhima (one of the Pandavas) and Jarasandha, the then king of Magadha. Jarasandha was invincible as his body could rejoin any dismembered limbs. According to the legend, Bhima split Jarasandha into two and threw the two halves facing opposite to each other so that they could not join. There is a famous Jarasandha's Akhara (the place where martial arts are practised).

Rajgir was the capital of Haryanka dynasty kings Bimbisara (558–491 BC) and Ajatashatru (492–460 BC). Ajatashatru kept his father Bimbisara in captivity here. The sources do not agree on which of the Buddha's royal contemporaries, Bimbisara and Ajatashatru, was responsible for its construction. It was the ancient capital city of the Magadha kings until the 5th century BC when Udayin (460–440 BC), son of Ajatashatru, moved the capital to Pataliputra (modern Patna). Shishunaga (413-395 BC) founded Shishunaga dynasty in 413 BC with Rajgir as its initial capital before it was moved to Pataliputra. It is associated with the founders of both the religions: Jainism and Buddhism, associated with both the historical Arihant Shraman Bhagawan Mahavira and Buddha. It was here that Gautama Buddha spent several months meditating, and preaching at Gridhra-kuta, ('Hill of the Vultures').It was also the relaxing place of him in Venuban which is a government owned tourist place now. He also delivered some of his famous sermons and initiated king Bimbisara of Magadha and others to Buddhism. It was here that Budhha delivered his famous Atanatiya Sutra. On one of the hills is the Saptaparni Cave where the First Buddhist Council was held under the leadership of Maha Kassapa.

Mahavira, the 24th Tirthankara spent fourteen years of his life at Rajgir and Nalanda, spending Chaturmas (i.e. 4 months of the rainy season) at a single place in Rajgir (Rajgruhi) and the rest in the places in the vicinity. It was the capital of one of his Shravaks (follower) King Shrenik. Thus Rajgir is also of religious importance to Jains. The twentieth Jain Tirthankara, Munisuvrata is supposed to have been born here. An ancient temple (about 1200 years old) dedicated to Tirthankara Munisuvrata is also present here along with many other Jain temples. This temple is also a place for four Kalyanakas of Tirthankara Munisuvrata.

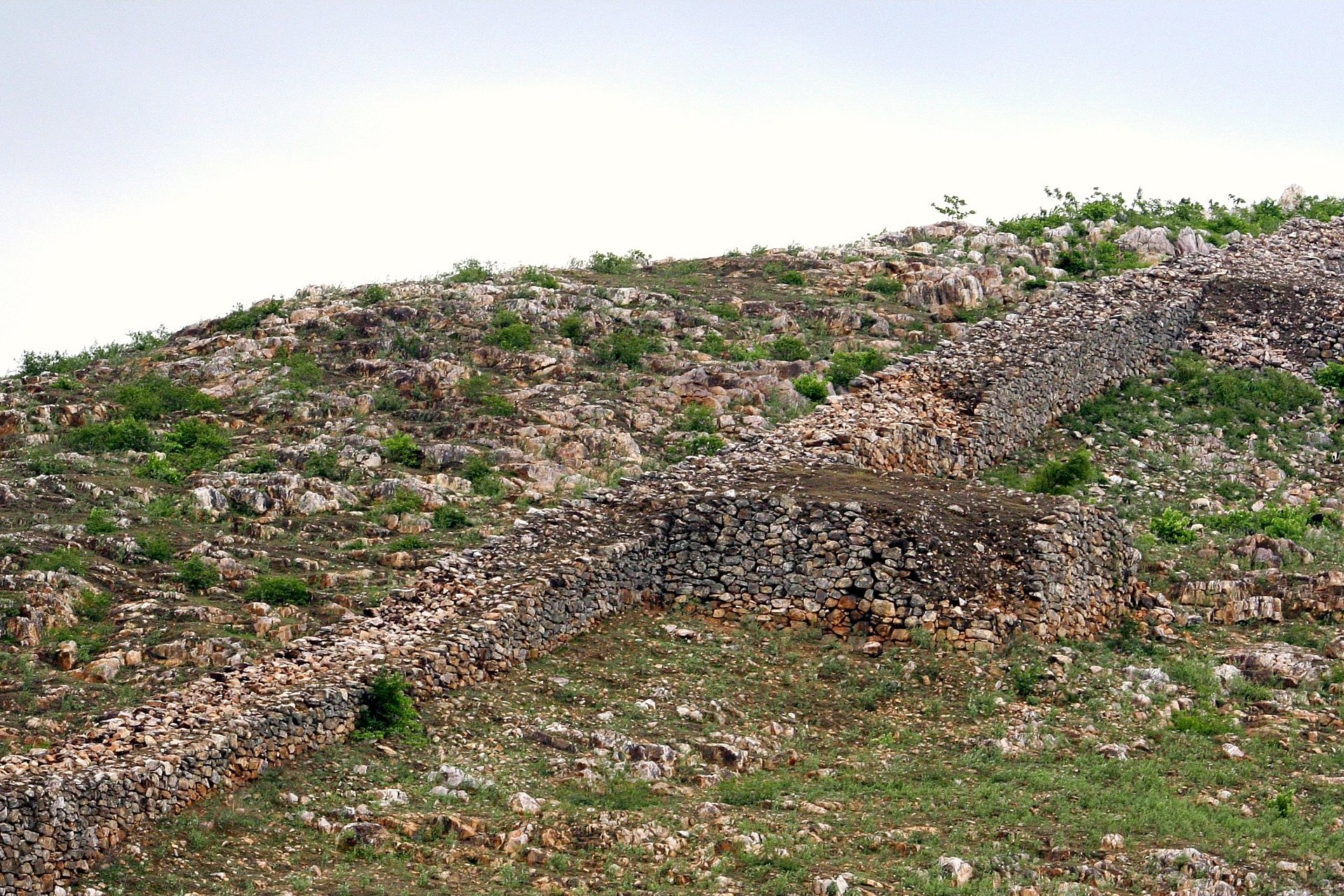
The historic locality is surrounded by the Rajgir Hills and remains of cyclopean walls.

It is also mentioned in Jain and Buddhist scriptures, which give a series of place-names, but without geographical context. The attempt to locate these places is based largely on reference to them and to other locations in the works of Chinese Buddhist pilgrims, particularly Faxian and Xuanzang. It is on the basis of Xuanzang in particular that the site is divided into Old and New Rajgir. The former lies within a valley and is surrounded by low-lying hills, Rajgir Hills. It is defined by an earthen embankment (the Inner Fortification), with which is associated the Outer Fortification, a complex of cyclopean walls that runs (with large breaks) along the crest of the hills. New Rajgir is defined by another, larger, embankment outside the northern entrance of the valley and next to the modern town.

The old site of Rajgir was surrounded by an almost 50 km-long cyclopean wall that followed the tops of the surrounding hills. It likely served a dual purpose as both defence against attackers and protection from potential flooding caused by monsoon rainwater flowing down from the hills. 16 towers were also built along the walls at irregular intervals to strengthen the defences. The most notable of these was the Pippala stone house, whose remains have been identified on the eastern slope of the Vaibhara hill. Probably originally built to house guards, it later became known as a place where the Buddha often stayed. Later, when it was no longer used for defensive purposes, the Pippala house's 11 small cells were likely repurposed to serve as individual meditation rooms for Buddhist monks. Based on archaeological finds, the cyclopean walls of old Rajgir are dated to about the 6th century BCE, while "New" Rajgir was probably fortified around the 1st century BCE.

=== Gupta and Pala periods ===
Rajgir appears to have declined in importance somewhat after the 1st or 2nd century CE. Xuanzang visited the site in the 7th century, but the only contemporary activity he mentioned was two old Buddhist monasteries that still had active monastic communities; other than that, he only wrote about Rajgir's ancient past. He attributed almost all the religious monuments he saw to Bimbisara or Ashoka and did not mention any contemporary patrons or building activity. This stands in stark contrast to his descriptions of Nalanda and Bodh Gaya, which both contain reference to events that took place either during his own lifetime or in the recent past. (For example, he referred to Nalanda's alleged vandalism by Shashanka and restoration under Purnavarmana, as well as patronage at Bodh Gaya by the Gupta rulers Kumaragupta I [aka Shakraditya], Budhagupta, and Narasimhagupta [aka Baladitya].) Yijing's account from later in the 7th century also refers only to Rajgir's ancient past. Kakoli Ray describes the impression of Rajgir from these accounts as a place "[living] in its own past, haloed by sacred memory and association but uncared for by [their] contemporaries."

Rajgir was hardly abandoned, though – in fact, the first clear evidence of Hindu activity dates from this period, during the 5th century. The Maniyar maṭha, variously identified as a Shiva temple or a Naga shrine, dates from this period, although it appears to have been built on the site of an older structure dating back to the early centuries BCE. Some ceramic and sculptural finds from the site are stylistically dated to later, with isolated sculptures dated as late as the 7th through 9th centuries, indicating that Hindu worship continued at the site throughout that period. Although Buddhist activity does seem to have dwindled significantly at Rajgir during this period, some Buddhist finds are attributed to as late as the 10th through 12th centuries. Some of these may have been made at Nalanda before being transported to Rajgir. Meanwhile, Rajgir never seems to have lost importance for Jains, who continued to actively patronise the site. A ruined Jain temple on the Vaibhara hill probably dates from the 5th century, while an image of Rishabhanatha donated by the acharya Vasantanandi is dated to the 8th or 9th century. Rajgir also kept political significance during this period, as the capital of a vishaya in Magadha bhukti attested during the Gupta and Pala periods. An inscribed copper seal that once belonged to the Rajgir vishaya's guild of blacksmiths and carpenters, palaeographically dated to perhaps the 5th century, was found at Rajgir, indicating a certain level of commercial organisation at Rajgir during this period.

== In Jainism ==
Rājagṛha is the place where Munisuvrata, the 20th tirthankara, experienced 4 (conception, birth, initiation into monkhood, and attainment of omniscience) of his Panch Kalyanakas (4 except attainment of nirvana, which happened at Sammet Shikharji). Additionally, the Śvētāmbara Siddhāntha notes that Vasupujya, the 12th tirthankara, broke his fast at Rājagṛha. As per the Kalpa Sūtra, a 3rd century BCE scripture of the Śvētāmbara Siddhāntha, Mahavira Swami, the 24th tirthankara, spent 10 chaturmasyas (4 months-long rainy season retreats) at Rājagṛha. It is also the place where the 11 ganadharas (chief disciples) of Mahavira attained nirvana. Rājagṛha was the capital city of Magadha, which was then ruled by King Śreṇika, a devout disciple of Mahavira. The significance of each of the 5 hills of Rājagṛha is described at length in Aupapātika Sūtra, a 5th century BCE Śvetāmbara Jaina scripture.

=== Naulakhā Jaina Temple ===
A Śvētāmbara Jaina temple located at the foothills of Rājagṛha, this temple is also known as "Gāon Mandira" (village temple). It spans 8,007 sq. ft. of area and its spire reaches a maximum height of 87 ft., including the flagstaff. The spire features 85 decorative kalaśas. The principal deity of this temple is a black-coloured stone idol of Munisuvrata. The idol was installed in 1447 CE by Jinadāsa, a lay follower, and features sculptures of demi-gods performing ritualistic bathing of the idol, and of attendant demi-gods. It also features lions carved at the base of the idol. The temple was renovated thrice - first time in 1763 CE by Manekchandbhai of Hooghly, the second time in 1961 CE by Devasibhai of Jharia, and the third time in 2008. A new 9.1 ft. tall idol of Munisuvrata was installed by Ācārya Kailāśasāgarasūri in 1961 CE. Apart from these idols, it also features ancient idols of Rishabhanatha (dated to 1447 CE and brought from Suvarṇagiri, the 4th hill), and Shantinatha (dated to 1447 CE and brought from Ratnagiri, the 2nd hill). The idol of Rishabhanatha features long locks of hair in accordance with the beliefs of Śvetāmbara Jainas as described in Ācārya Hemacandrasūri's Triṣaṣṭiśalākāpuruṣacaritra. An undated (possibly 15th century CE) idol of Pārśvanātha (brought from Udayagiri, the 3rd hill) is also present here. In 2008, an idol of Mahavira was consecrated by Ācārya Muktiprabhasūri in the underground cellar of the temple.

=== Vipulācalgiri (1st Hill) ===
As per Aupapātika Sūtra, Mahavira delivered sermons at the Guṇaśīla Caitya, located on this hill. An inscription at the Naulakhā temple notes that Vaccarāja and Devarāja, two lay devotees, built a temple on this hill in the 14th century CE. The same temple was renovated by Saṅghapati Saṅgrām Chopra in the 17th century CE and by Rāi Bahādur Dhanpatsingh Dugar in the 18th century CE. A newer temple dedicated to Munisuvrata, was built on the same spot in 2008, under the guidance of Ācārya Muktiprabhasūri and Ācārya Vijayakunjarasūri. Historical records of Jaina travellers note the existence of 6 Śvetāmbara temples on this hill in the 17th century CE and 8 Śvetāmbara temples on this hill in the 18th century CE. A temple dedicated to Aimutta Muni, a popular Śvetāmbara monk who attained omniscience while reciting Iryavahiyam Sūtra, exists on this hill.

=== Ratnagiri (2nd Hill) ===
Kavi Jayakīrti, a 16th century CE Jaina traveller, notes the presence of a Śvetāmbara temple dedicated to Rishabhanatha, on this hill. At the beginning of the 17th century CE, Panyās Jayavijaya records the existence of 2 Śvetāmbara temples on this hill and by the end of the 17th century CE, Panyās Saubhāgyavijaya notes the presence of 3 Śvetāmbara temples on this hill. Currently, a caturmukha (four-faced) Śvetāmbara temple with Chandraprabha as the principal deity, exists on this hill. This temple was renovated once in 1763 CE and for the second time in 2008.

=== Udayagiri (3rd Hill) ===
It is located 1.5 km from Ratnagiri and is home to the Śvetāmbara temple of Śyāmaliyā Pārśvanātha. Historical records indicate that this hill once housed idols of Pārśvanātha, Rishabhanatha, Abhinandana Swami, and Śāntinātha. A caturmukha (four-faced) Śvetāmbara temple existed here until the early 16th century CE.

=== Suvarṇagiri (4th Hill) ===
Historical accounts from the 16th-17th centuries CE mention the presence of 5-16 temples here. 16th century Jaina traveller Kavi Jayakīrti notes the presence of 6 Śvetāmbara temples here. At the beginning of the 17th century CE, Panyās Jayavijaya recorded 5 Śvetāmbara temples on this hill and by the end of 17th century CE, Panyās Saubhāgyavijaya noted the presence of 17 Śvetāmbara temples on this hill. The hill currently hosts a Śvetāmbara temple of Rishabhanatha.

=== Vaibhāragiri (5th Hill) ===
The site where Munisuvrata attained omniscience and the sacred ground where Mahavira's 11 ganadharas (chief disciples) attained nirvana. Historical records from the 16th-17th centuries CE mention between 24-52 temples here (24 as per Hansasomavijaya in 16th century CE, 25 as per Jayavijaya in the early 17th century CE, and 52 as per Saubhāgyavijaya at the end of the 17th century CE). The hill currently houses 6 Śvetāmbara temples and features archaeological remains of ancient Gupta-era temples with rare sculptures including the first ever idol with a lānchana (Tirthankar Neminatha, from early 5th century CE). Notable temples here include Puruṣadāniya Pārśva temple (with footprints dating back to 1844 CE and 1855 CE), Mahavira temple, renovated in 1607 CE with Mughal-era artistic elements housing footprints dating back to 1874 CE, Munisuvrata's temple (known as Baḍā Mandira) dating back to 1865 CE, with a nine-tier spire, Dhaññā-Śālibhadra's temple (installed in 1468 CE, rebuilt in 1954 CE and 2008), the site where Mahavira's ganadharas attained moksha through the practice of sallekhana and the place marking the attainment of nirvana by the 11 ganadharas, including Gautama Swami (current footprints installed in 1774 CE by Jagat Seth Mehtab Rai).

=== Sona Bhaṇḍāra Cave ===
It is a 34 ft. long and 17 ft. wide cave on the foothills of Rājagṛha. Folk legends suggest it contains King Śreṇika's hidden treasure behind a sealed wall. An inscription indicates it was built for Jaina ascetics by Ācārya Vairadevasūri in the 4th century CE. The cave walls feature carved images of tirthankaras Padmaprabha, Pārśvanātha, Mahavira, and others. The outer walls display the Jaina Dharmachakra (wheel of dharma) and a few 3rd-4th century CE inscriptions in mixed Sanskrit and Pali.

== Geography and climate ==
The modern town of Rajgir lies just to the north of the Rajgir Hills, an isolated pair of parallel ridges that rise sharply up from the flat surrounding plains. The ancient site of Rajgir was located in the narrow valley between the two sets of hills. Historically, Rajgir was thought of as lying between five hills, but different texts give them different names (the Mahābhārata even gives two different lists of five names in the same chapter), making it difficult to identify the five hills with their modern counterparts. The modern names are Vaibhara, Vipula, Chaṭa (छठा-गिरि), Shaila, Udaya, Sona, and Ratnagiri. Of these, Ratnagiri is the highest, at about 305 m.

Rajgir is known for its hot springs, which have held religious significance since ancient times. The best-known today is Brahmakuṇḍa, and there are several other springs in this area whose waters merge to form a stream. Another prominent spring is the Sūryakuṇḍa, which is part of a cluster of springs on the north side of the hills. Sūryakuṇḍa's water is stagnant and murky and a favoured habitat by frogs. Another major water feature in the area is the Panchane River (from Pañcānanā, "having five mouths"), which flows to the east of Rajgir.

Rajgir has a monsoon climate, with an annual rainfall of about 113 cm. Rainfall peaks in July and August.

- Summer temperature: maximum 44 °C (111.2 °F), minimum 20 °C (68 °F)
- Winter temperature: maximum 28 °C (82.4 °F), minimum 6 °C (42.8 °F)
- Rainfall: 1,860 mm (mid-June to mid-September)
- Dry/warm season: March to October

=== Rajgir Wildlife Sanctuary ===
The landscape of Rajgir or Pant WLS is uneven terrain enclosed by five hills; Ratnagiri, Vipulgiri, Vaibhagiri, Songiri and Udaygiri. It is situated in Nalanda Forest Division covering an area of 35.84 km^{2} under the Nalanda district administration. This wildlife sanctuary, notified in 1978, represents a remnant patch of forests nestled in the Rajgir Hills within the south Gangetic Plain.

It is home to a number of wild animals including: mammals – blue bull (Boselaphus tragocamelus), chital or spotted deer (Axis axis), Indian crested porcupine (Hystrix indica), small Indian civet (Viverricula indica), jungle cat (Felis chaus); birds – painted spurfowl (Galloperdix lunulata), Eurasian thick knee (Burhinus oedicnemus), painted sandgrouse (Pterocles indicus); reptiles and amphibians – Bengal monitor (Varanus bengalensis), Indian bullfrog (Hoplobatrachus tigerinus), Jerdon's bullfrog (Hoplobatrachus crassus), ornate narrow-mouthed frog (Microhyla ornata), and Indian tree frog (Polypedates maculatus).

== Demographics ==
=== Population ===
According to 2011 Indian Census, Rajgir had a total population of 41,587, of which 21,869 were males and 19,718 were females. The population within the age group of 0 to 6 years was 6,922. The total number of literates in Rajgir was 24,121, which constituted 58.0% of the population with male literacy of 65.4% and female literacy of 49.8%. The effective literacy rate of the 7+ population of Rajgir was 69.6%, of which the male literacy rate was 78.1% and the female literacy rate was 60.1%. The Scheduled Castes and Scheduled Tribes population was 11,724 and 42 respectively. Rajgir had 7030 households in 2011.

=== Religion ===
The town is also notable in Jainism and Buddhism. It was the birthplace of the 20th Jain Tirthankar Munisuvrata, and is closely associated with the Mahavira and Gautama Buddha. Both Mahavira and Buddha taught their beliefs in Rajgir during the 6th and 5th century BC, and the Buddha was offered a forest monastery here by the king Bimbisara. As such, the city of Rajgir became one of the Buddha's most important preaching locations.

== Tourism ==
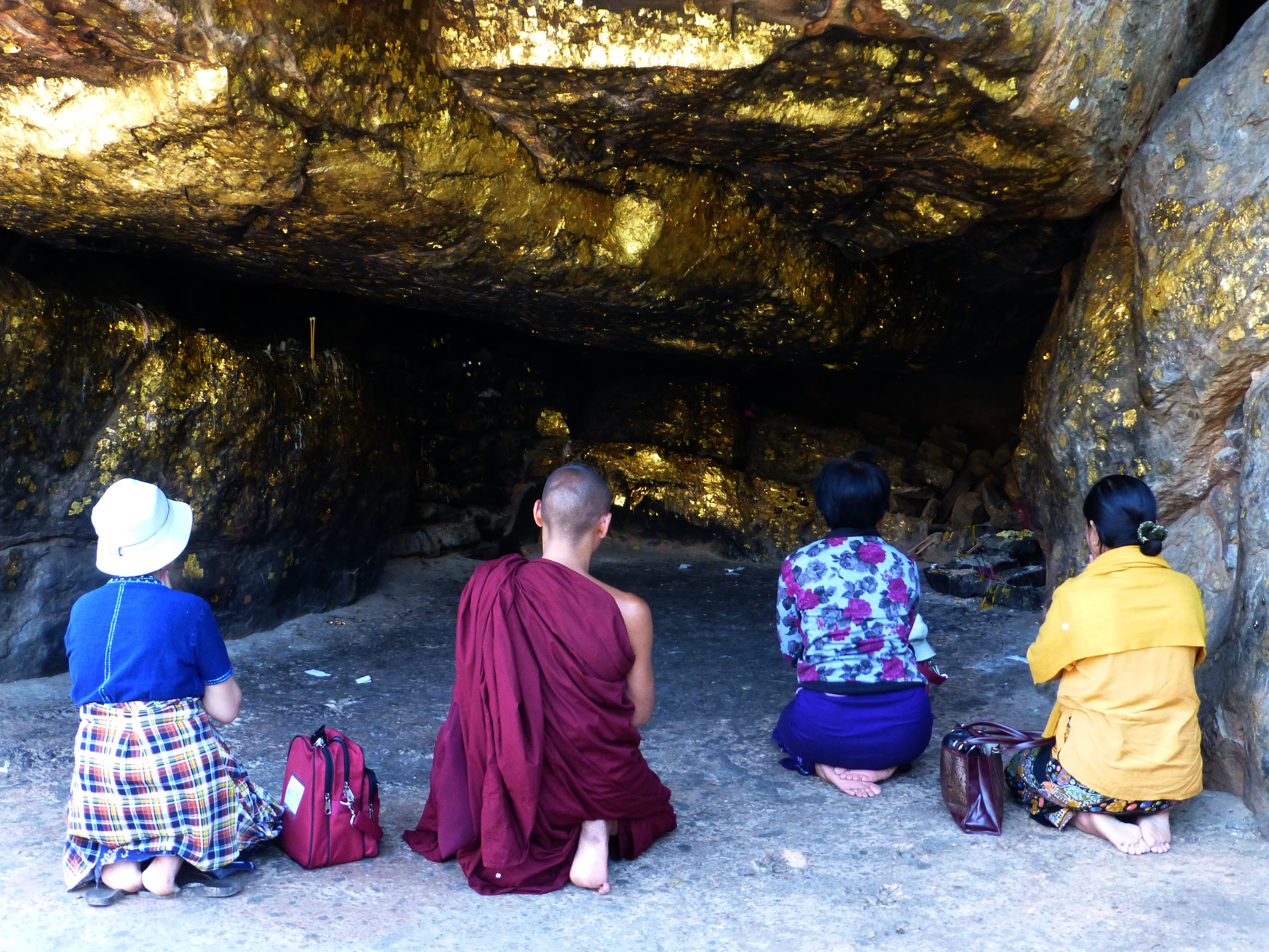
Boar's Cave

The main tourist attractions include the ancient city walls from Ajatashatru's period, Bimbisar's Jail, Jarasandh's Akhara, Gridhra-kuta, ('Hill of the Vultures'), Son Bhandar Caves and the Jain temples on the five peaks.

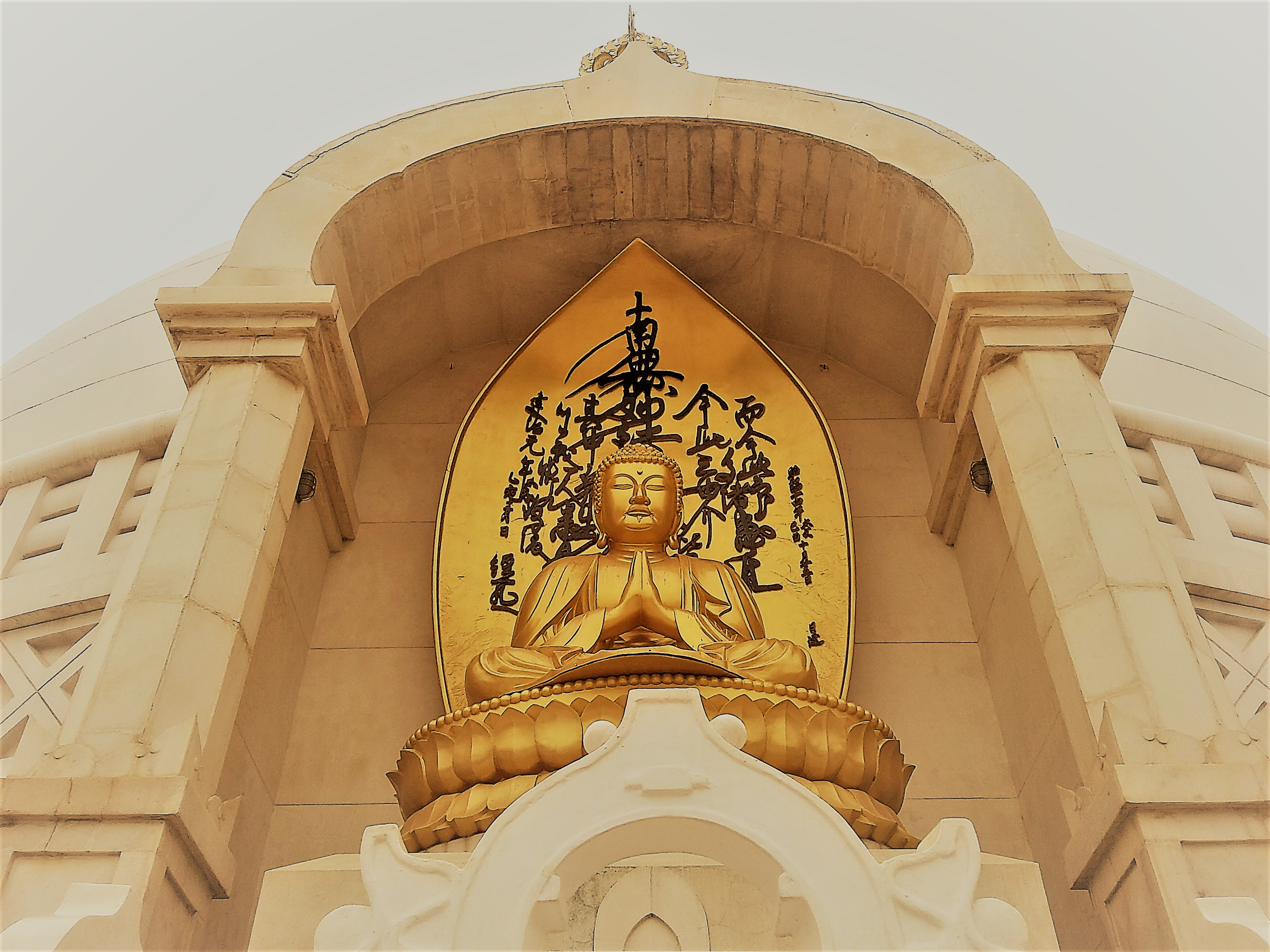
Closeup of Buddha at Vishwa Shanti Stupa

Another major attraction is the peace pagoda, Vishwa Shanti Stupa, built-in 1969, one of the 80 peace pagodas in the world, to spread the message of peace and non-violence. It is the oldest peace pagoda in India. The rope-way that leads to it is another attraction, which was gifted by Japanese spiritual leader Fuji Guruji in the 1960s.

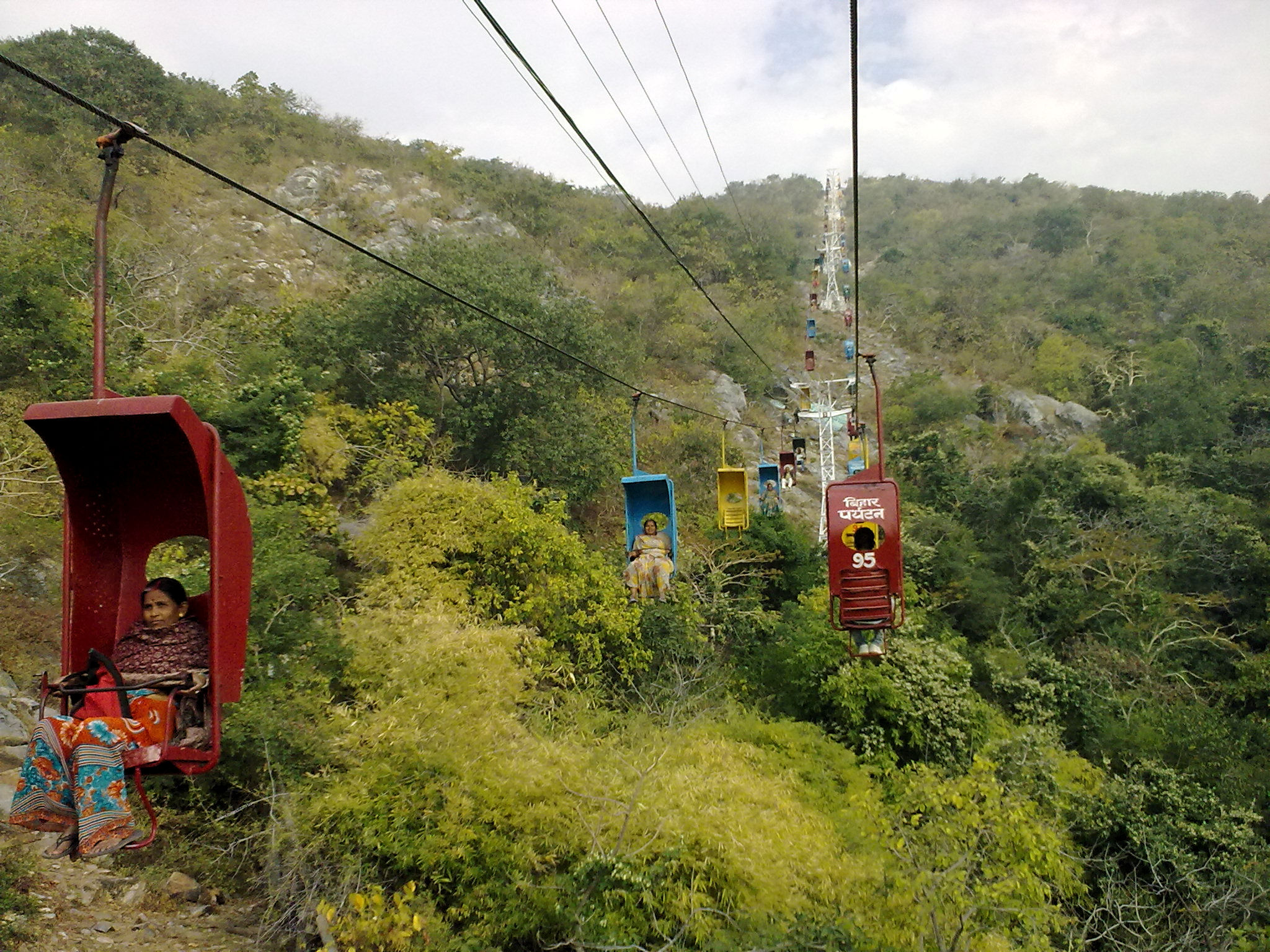
Rope way from the 1960s

A new rope way has been planned.

Rajgir has hot water springs, locally known as Brahmakund, a sacred place for Hindus where water from seven different springs (Saptarshi) merge and is notable for its healing effects.

There is a Japanese temple beside the Venu Vana, an artificial forest with historical associations to Buddha and the kings of the region. Other places of interest include the Rajgir Heritage Museum, the Sariputta Stupa, Ghora Katora Lake, and the Rajgir glass bridge.

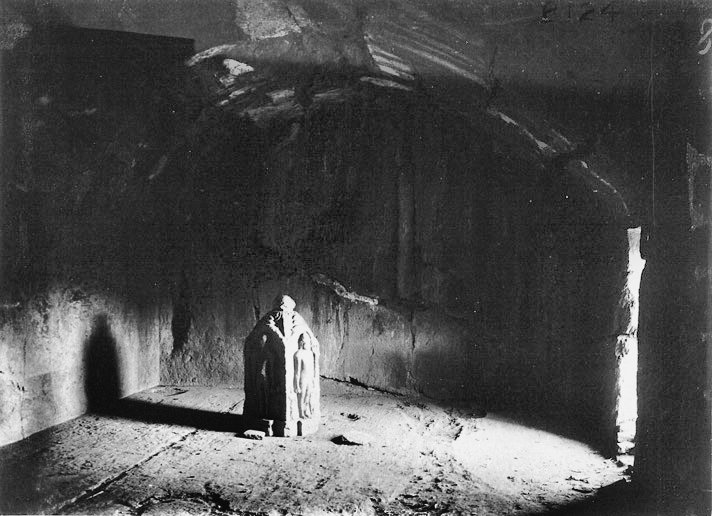
The Son Bhandar Caves (Caddy 1895)

The Son Bhandar Caves are situated in Rajgir. The caves are concerned with Jainism and are considered to belong to 3–4 century AD. After Cunningham's inspection, several scholars visited this place and some had opinions to concern with Buddhism. After some time all Buddhism connections were refused because of an inscription found on the southern wall of a cave. According to this inscription these caves were built by inspiration of a Jain Muni Vair for Jain ascetics. Sculptures of Teerthankaras were also carved in these caves. From an architectural aspect; these caves are analogous to Nagarjuni cave and Barabar Caves caves of Mauryan era. Therefore, it can be concluded that construction time should not differ much from the above-mentioned caves.

These caves should be related to Digambar sect of Jainism as Xuanzang wrote in his book about Vaibhar Hill of Rajgir that the place was occupied by Digambar Jain monks for meditation purposes. After some centuries these caves were converted by Hindus as Vishnu sculpture was also found from the mound of a cave.

Makhdum Kund, also recognised as Dargah-e-Makhdoomiya is a sacred site situated in Rajgir. Renowned for its thermal spring and the tomb of Makhdoom Syed Ghulam Ali, as well as the prayer space of Sharfuddin Yahya Maneri, it holds significance for pilgrims and visitors alike. The thermal spring, dating back approximately 800 years, attracts numerous visitors who utilise it for ablution (Wudu) and bathing purposes. The Chief Minister of Bihar, Nitish Kumar also took bath here in his childhood.

Rajgir Zoo Safari or Rajgir Wildlife Safari is a Wildlife safari located in Rajgir, Bihar, India, that opened to public on 16 February 2022.

== Transportation ==
Bihar State Tourism Development Corporation provides travel facility from state capital Patna to visit Bodh circuit (Bodhgaya, Rajgir, Nalanda, Vaishali, Mehsi, Kesaria, Lumbini, Kushinagar, Sarnath), Jain Circuit (Rajgir, Pawapuri) and Sikh Circuit in Bihar.

- Air: The nearest is Gaya International Airport, Gaya which is 78 km which is connected to International Destinations like Bangkok, Colombo, etc. Another airport is at Patna 101 km. Air India, Indigo, Jet Airways and Go Air connect Jay Prakash Narayan Airport of Patna to Kolkata, Bengaluru, Mumbai, Delhi, Ranchi and Lucknow.
- Rail: Rajgir railway station connects the city to other parts of country yet the nearest convenient railhead is at Gaya Junction railway station 78 km.The Shramjeevi SF Express, connects Rajgir with New Delhi, serving as a vital link between these cities. The Bakhtiyarpur-Gaya line provides improved rail connectivity to many places. It is one of the destinations of the prestigious Buddhist pilgrimage train of Indian Railways-Mahaparinirvan Express.
- Road: Rajgir is connected by road to Patna – 110 km, Nalanda – 12 km, Gaya – 78 km, Pawapuri – 19 km, Bihar Sharif – 25 km, etc. NH 120, transverses the city of Rajgir, connecting it with Bodhgaya, Gaya, Nalanda, Bihar Sharif and further to Patna. State Highway 71 also passes through Rajgir connecting it with Giriyak, Islampur and Jahanabad.
- Bus: Regular buses are available from all the above said points to Rajgir.
- Local Transport: Electric Rickshaw and Buses and Tongas are available.

== Economy ==
Located in Patna division, this Nagar Panchayat type of municipal council mainly depends upon tourism and is supplemented by agriculture. A number of resorts and hotels are located in Rajgir to serve the tourists. In addition, Rajgir is located near the tourist spots like Nalanda, Pawapuri and Kundalpur.

Rajgir ranks top in Bihar, in reference to revenue collected by tourism.

- An ordinance factory for defence forces is located in the city.
- Rajgir is also home to Bihar Police Academy.
- RTC CRPF – Rajgir is also home to the Recruit Training centre of the Central Reserve Police Force for three states namely Bihar, Jharkhand and West Bengal.
- Government of Bihar has acquired 100 acres of land to build an IT city near Nalanda university and also develop India's first multimedia hub which will provide advanced courses in different spheres of IT.
- Rajgir Film City is an integrated film studio complex. Spread over 20 acres, it is the second largest integrated film city in Bihar. It is being built by the Bihar government since 2017.

== Sports ==
Rajgir International Cricket Stadium is a under construction cricket stadium in the city. It is located within Rajgir Sports Complex. In 2013, it was announced by the Chief Minister of Bihar Nitish Kumar that an international cricket stadium will be constructed at Rajgir in Bihar's Nalanda district.

== Nalanda University ==
Nalanda University, a modern university that is based on the famous university and Buddhist monastery of ancient India, has been established with its campus in Rajgir. It began its first academic session on 1 September 2014.

== Events ==
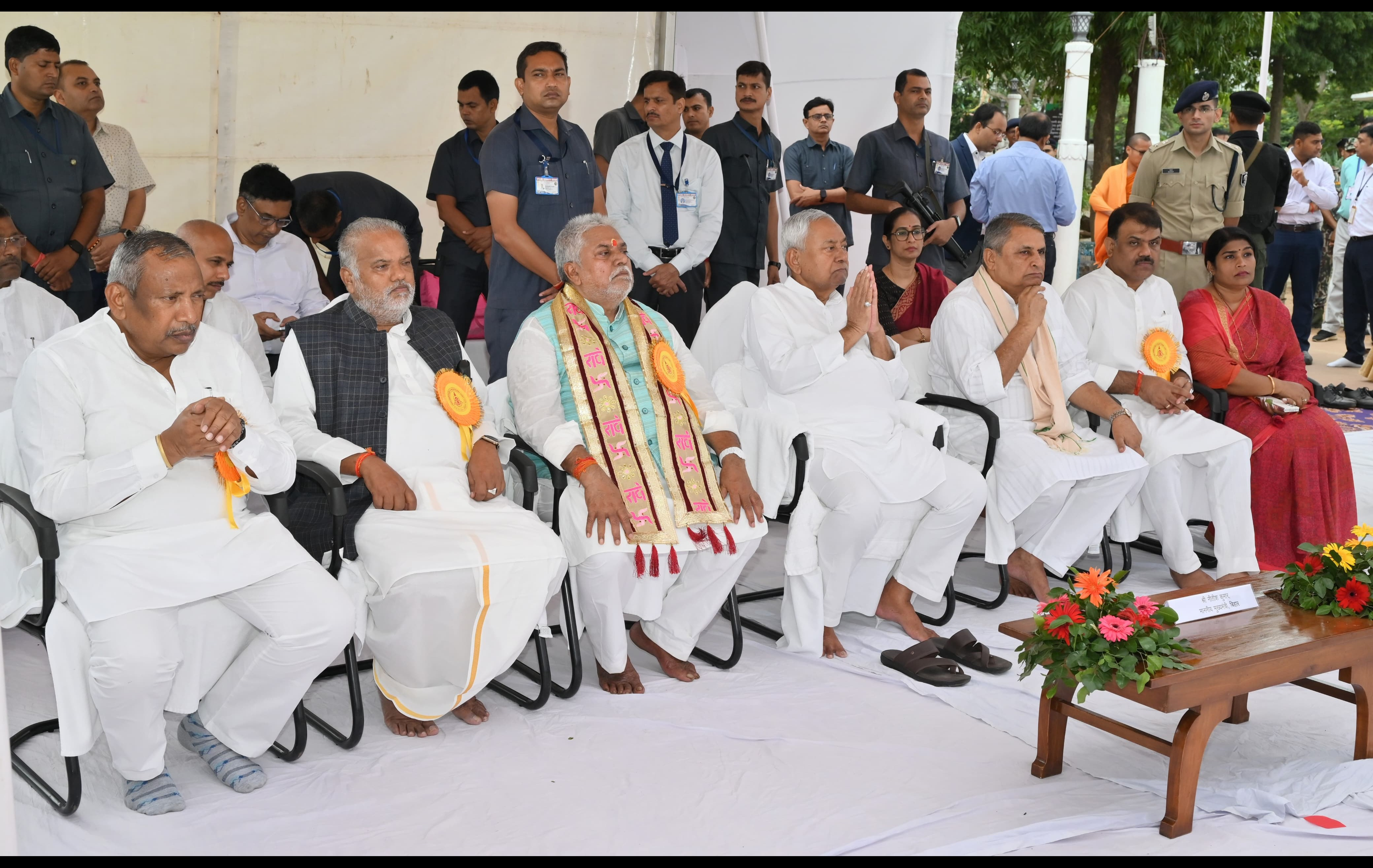
Nitish Kumar, Kaushal Kishore, Prem Kumar, Shrawan Kumar and others at 55th anniversary of establishment of Vishwa Shanti Stupa.

- Rajgir Mahotsav
- Purushottam Maas Mela
- Sariputta World Peace Walk
- Makar Sankranti Mela

Japanese monk Nichidatsu Fujii, the founder of Nipponzan Myohoji order of Buddhism established a white stupa atop Ratnagiri hills in Rajgir, which was inaugurated on 25 October 1969. This stupa is called Vishwa Shanti Stupa and from then onwards the anniversary of its establishment is celebrated every year. This event is attended by Budhhist monks and devotees from various south-east Asian countries and the ministers and officials of Government of Bihar.

== Notable people ==
- Bimbisara, ruler of Haryanaka Dynasty
- Ajatashatru, ruler of Haryanaka Dynasty
- Udayin, ruler of Haryanaka Dynasty
- Sariputta, one of the two chief disciples of Budhha
- Jivaka, a physician and contemporary of Bimbisara and Buddha
- Abhay K, poet, diplomat, editor, translator, ambassador, artist
- Satyadev Narayan Arya, Governor of Tripura, former Governor of Haryana, former 8-time MLA from Rajgir and former Minister of Mines and Geology of Bihar
- Jabir Husain, author and former chairperson of Bihar Legislative Council

== See also ==
- Rajgir Hills
- Atanatiya Sutta
- Rajgir Mahotsav
- Legendary kings of Magadha
- Bhadda Kundalakesa
- Nahub
- Kurkihar hoard
- Avanti-Magadhan Wars
