= Nahub =

Coordinates: 25°03′05″N 85°24′55″E

Nahub is a village situated in Nalanda district in the Indian state of Bihar. The village is located midway between the cities of Silao and Rajgir. Pin code of nahub is 803116
