= Vulture Peak =

Mountain top in India

Gijjhakūṭa
- Vulture Peak or Eagle Peak
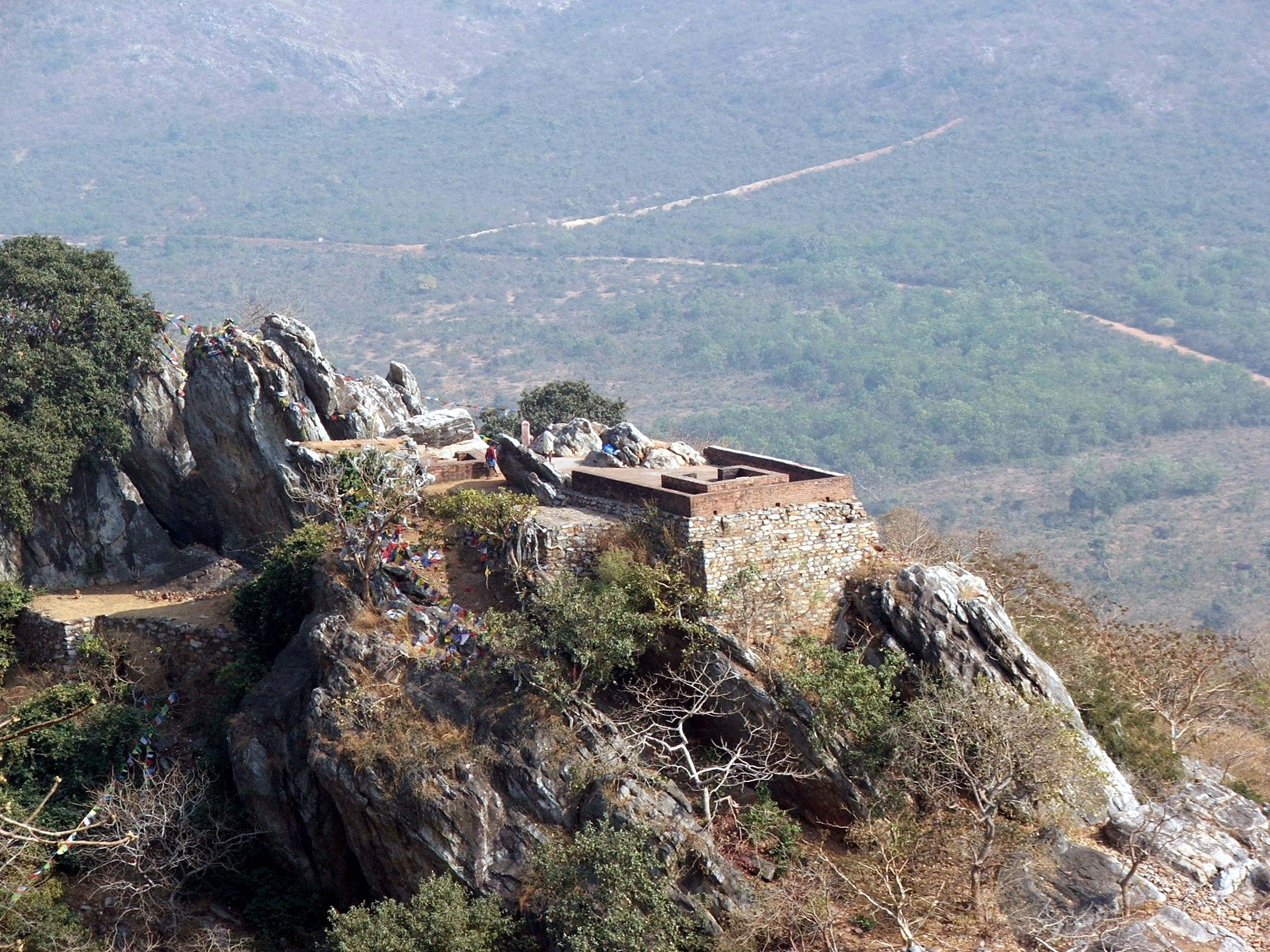
- Vulture Peak from above

Highest point
- Coordinates: 25°00′06″N 85°26′47″E

Geography
- Location within India
- Parent range: Rajgir Hills

Translations of Vulture Peak
- English: Holy Eagle Peak
- Sanskrit: गृध्रकूट (IAST: Gṛdhrakūṭa)
- Pali: गिज्झकूट (Gijjhakūṭa)
- Bengali: গৃধ্রশৃঙ্গ
- Burmese: ဂိဇ္ဈကုဋ်တောင်
- Chinese: 靈鷲山/灵鹫山 (Pinyin: Língjiùshān)
- Indonesian: Puncak Burung Nasar
- Japanese: 霊鷲山 (Rōmaji: Ryōjyusen)
- Korean: 영취산(靈鷲山) (RR: Yeongchwisan)
- Sinhala: ගිජ්ඣකූටය
- Tamil: கழுகு சிகரம்
- Thai: เขาคิชฌกูฏ

The Vulture Peak (Pali: Gijjhakūṭa गिज्झकूट, Sanskrit: Gṛdhrakūṭa गृध्रकूट), also known as the Holy Eagle Peak or Gridhrakūta (or Gādhrakūta), was, according to Buddhist tradition, the Buddha's favorite retreat in Rajagaha – now Rajgir, located in Bihar, India. It is so named because it resembles a sitting vulture with its wings folded, and was the scene for many of his discourses.

== In Buddhist literature ==
Vulture Peak Mountain is, by tradition, one of several sites frequented by the Buddha and his community of disciples for both training and retreat. Its location is frequently mentioned in Buddhist texts in the Pāli Canon of Theravada Buddhism and in the Mahayana sutras as the place where the Buddha gave certain sermons. Among the sermons are the Heart Sutra, the Lotus Sutra and the Śūraṅgama Samādhi Sūtra as well as many prajnaparamita sutras. It is explicitly mentioned in the Lotus Sutra, chapter 16, as the Buddha's pure land:

And when the living have become faithful,
Honest and upright and gentle,
And wholeheartedly want to see the Buddha,
Even at the cost of their own lives,

Then, together with the assembly of monks
I appear on Holy Eagle Peak.
...

Such are my divine powers.
Throughout countless eons,
I have always lived on Holy Eagle Peak
And in various other places.

When the living witness the end of an eon,
When everything is consumed in a great fire,
This land of mine remains safe and tranquil,
Always filled with human and heavenly beings.

== Gallery ==
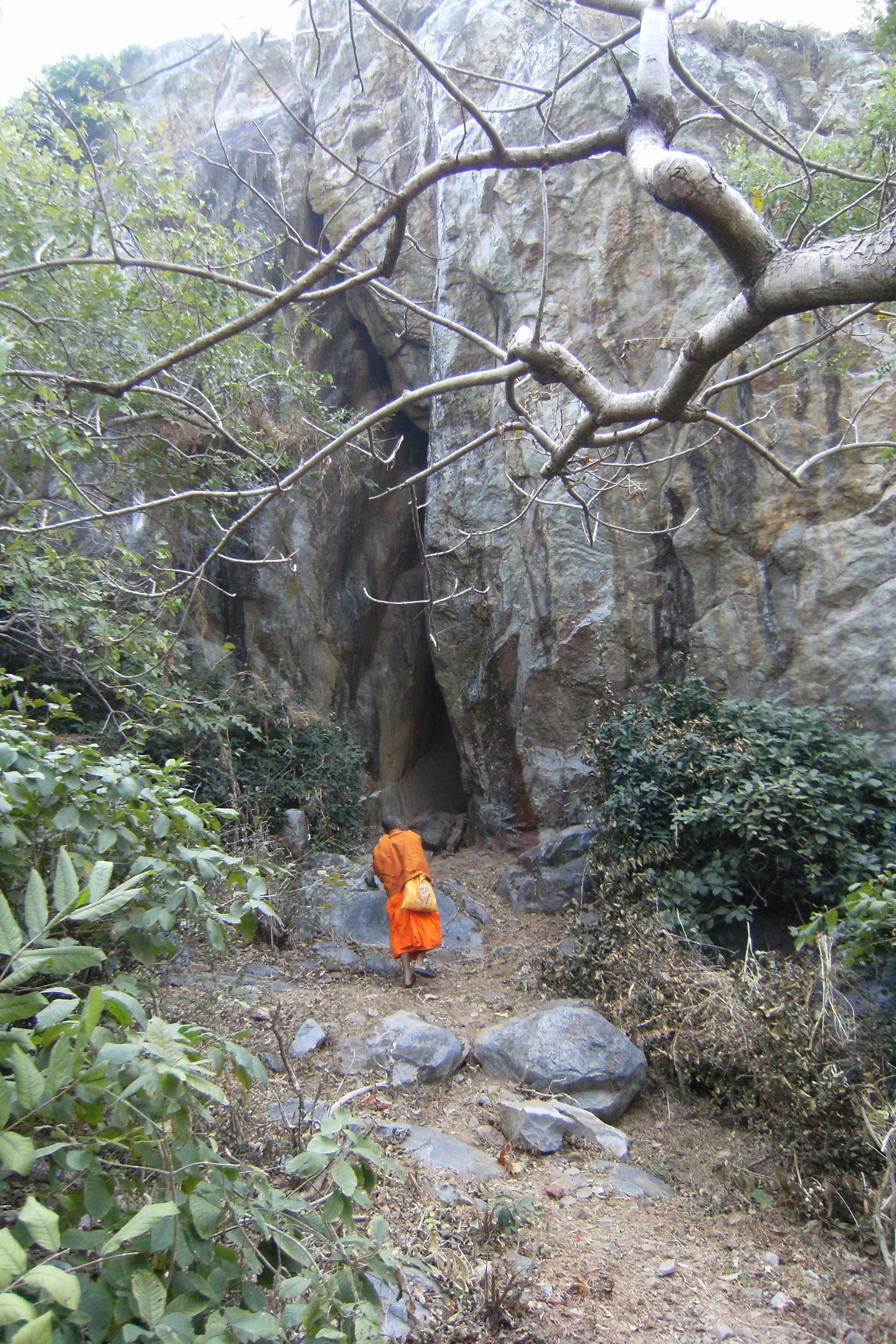
Monk in the hills around Vulture Peak

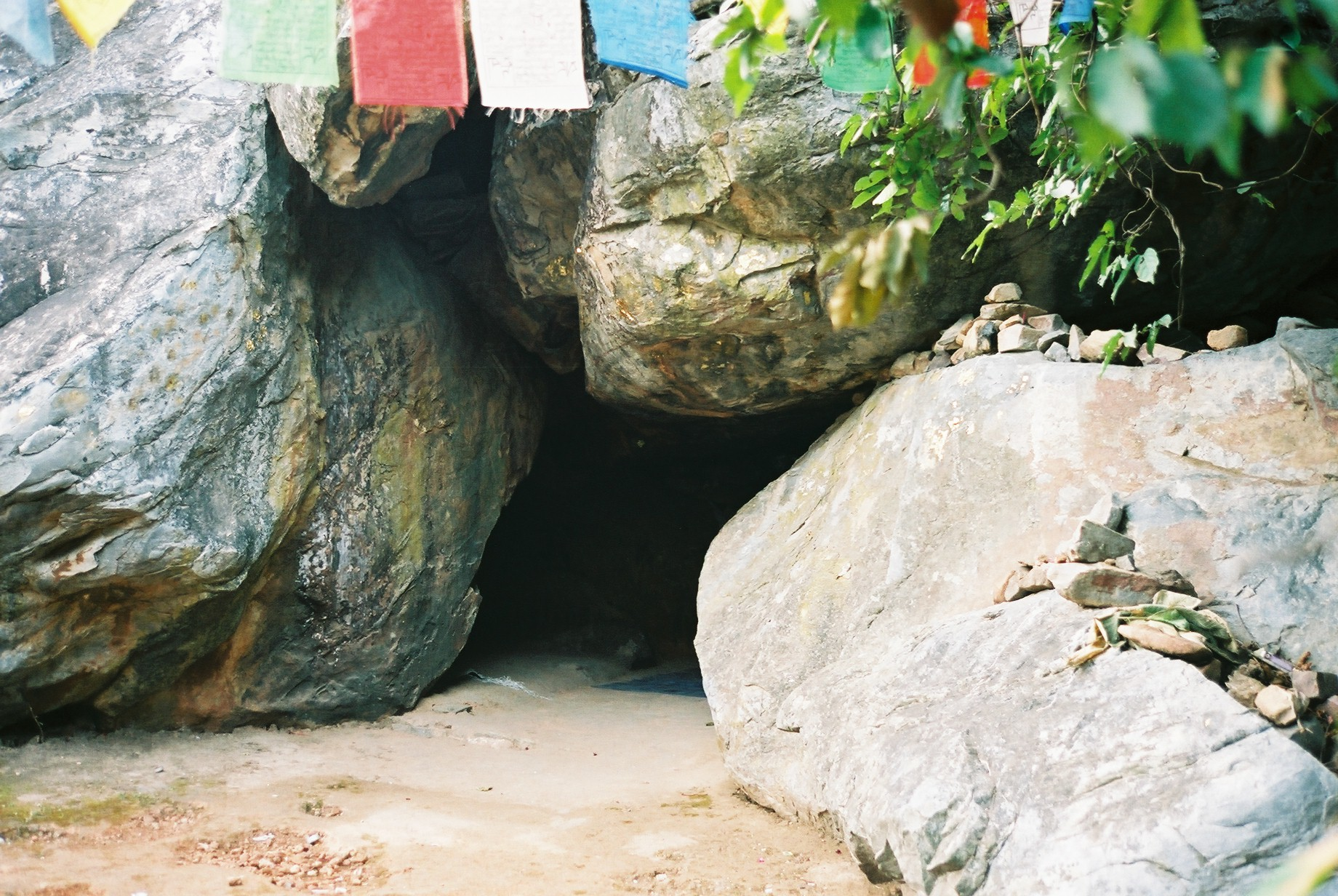
Meditation area

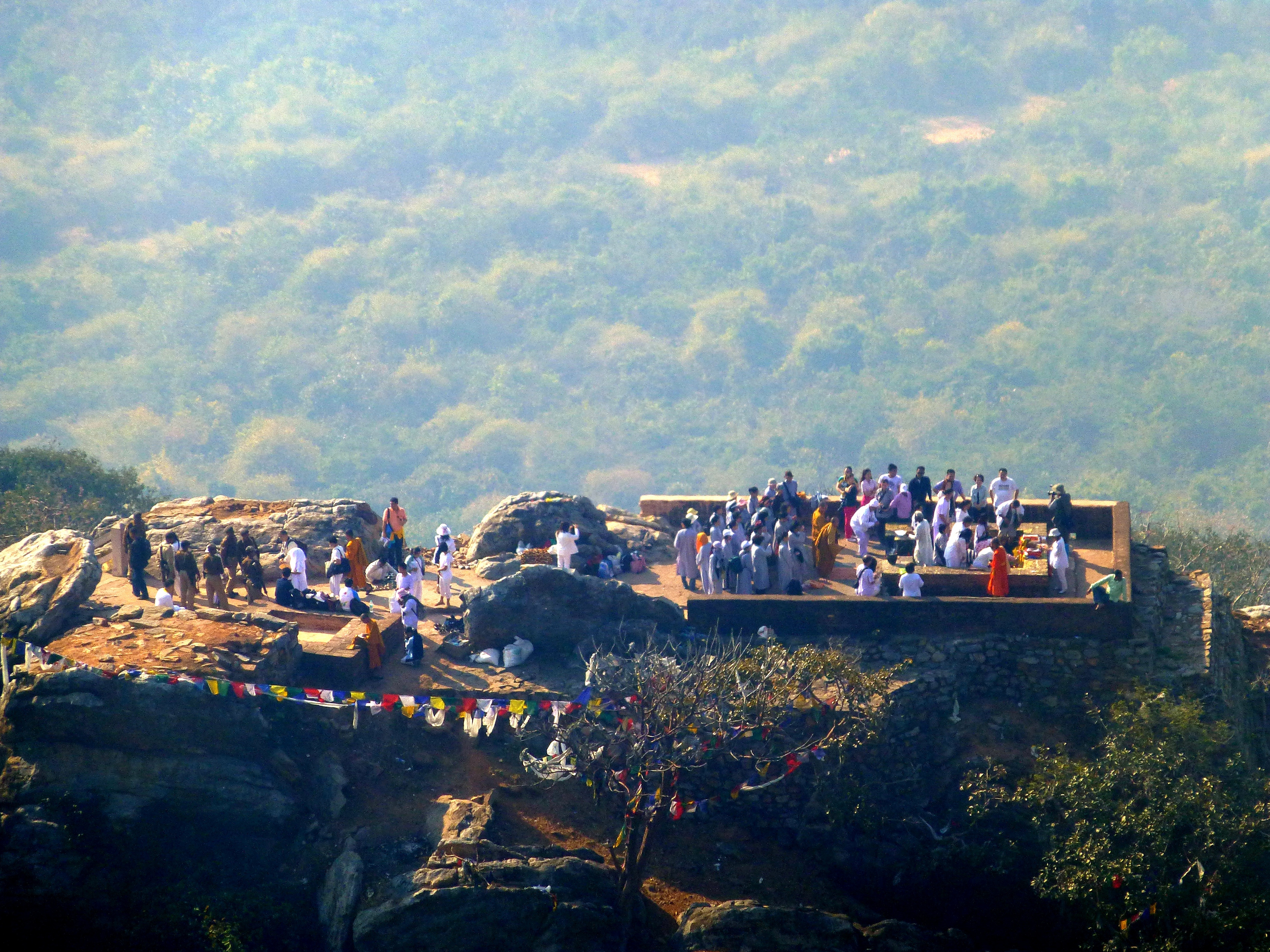
View from above

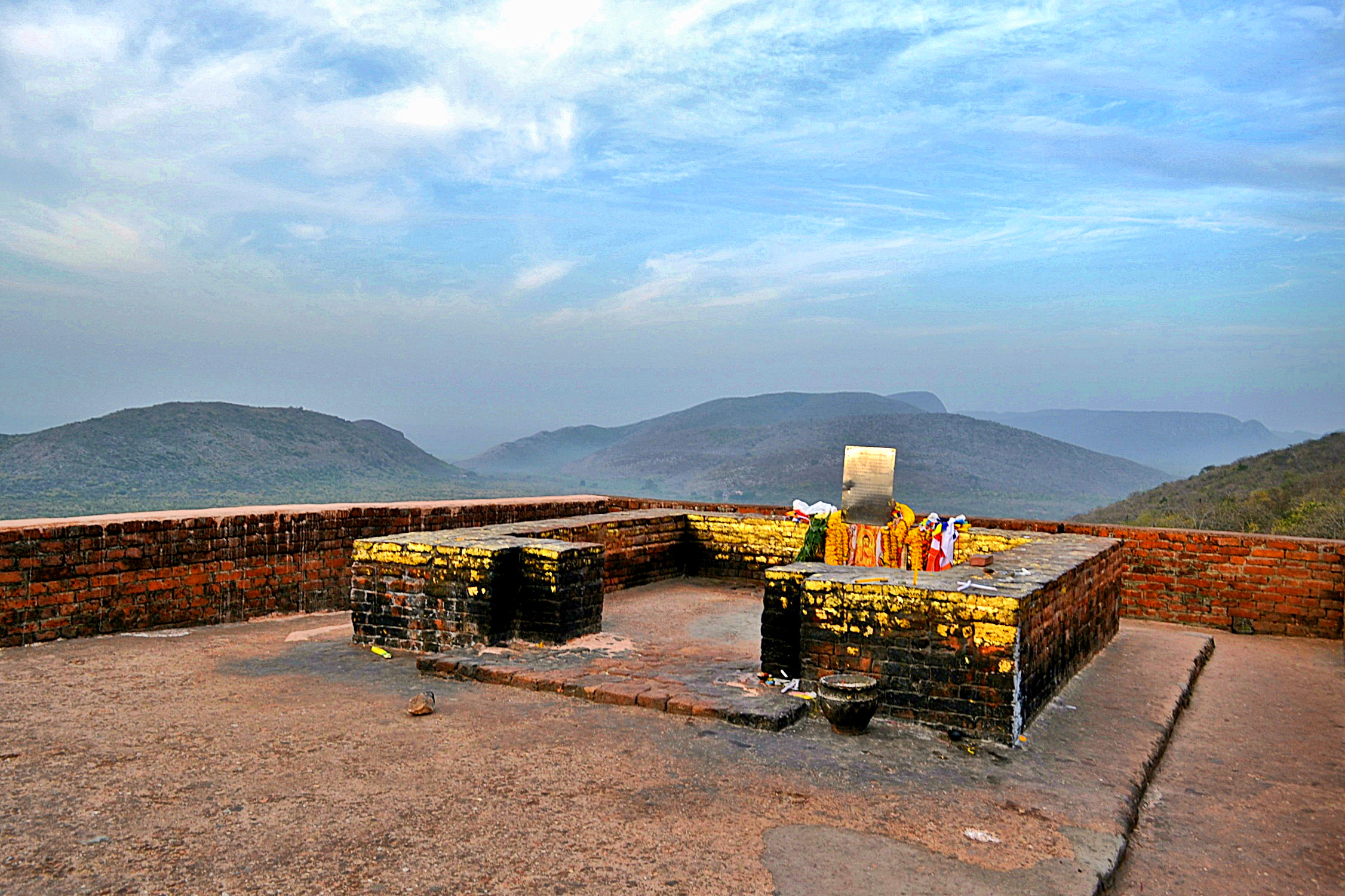
Vulture Peak

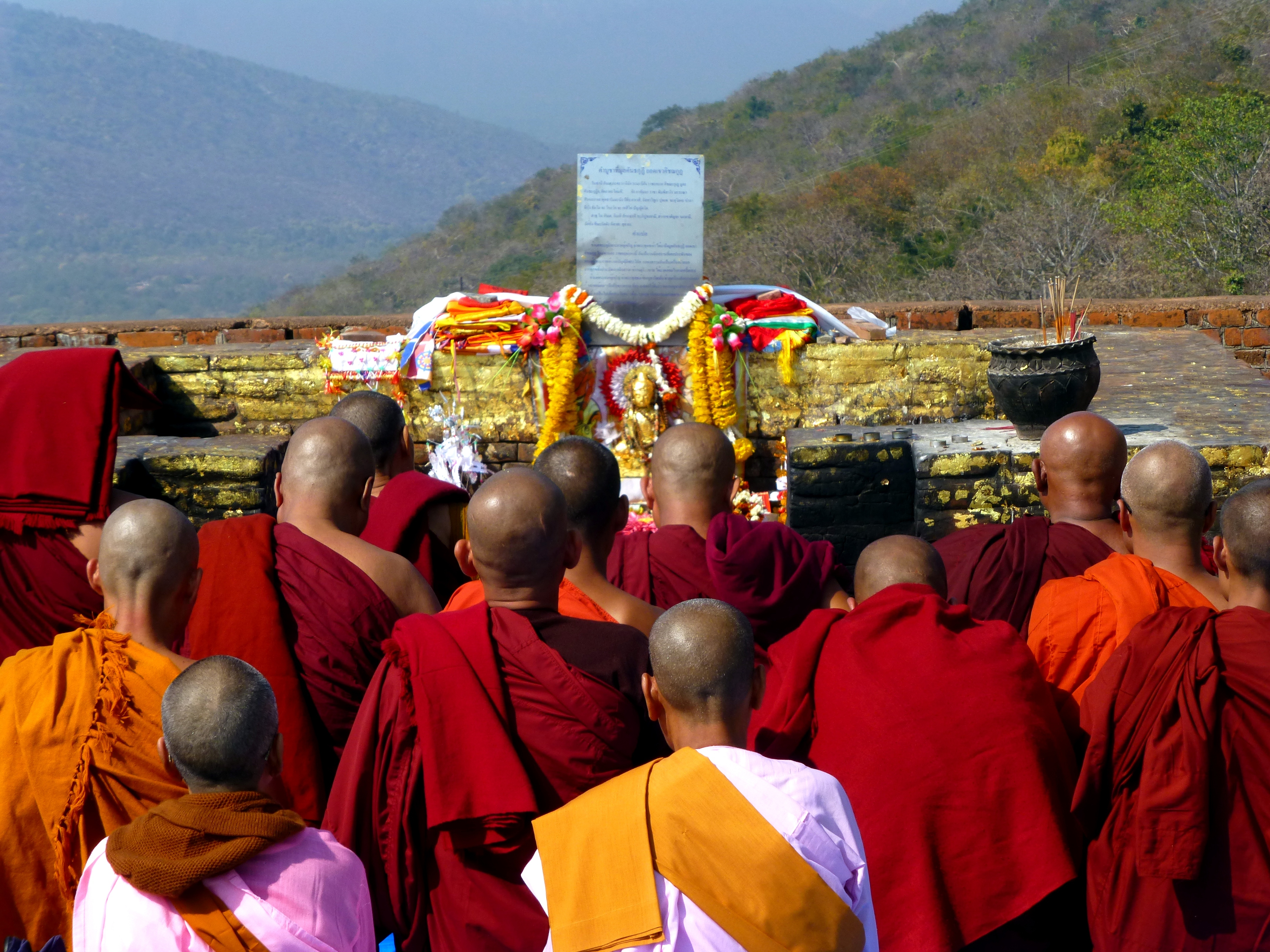
Buddhist assembly
