= Cyclopean Wall of Rajgir =

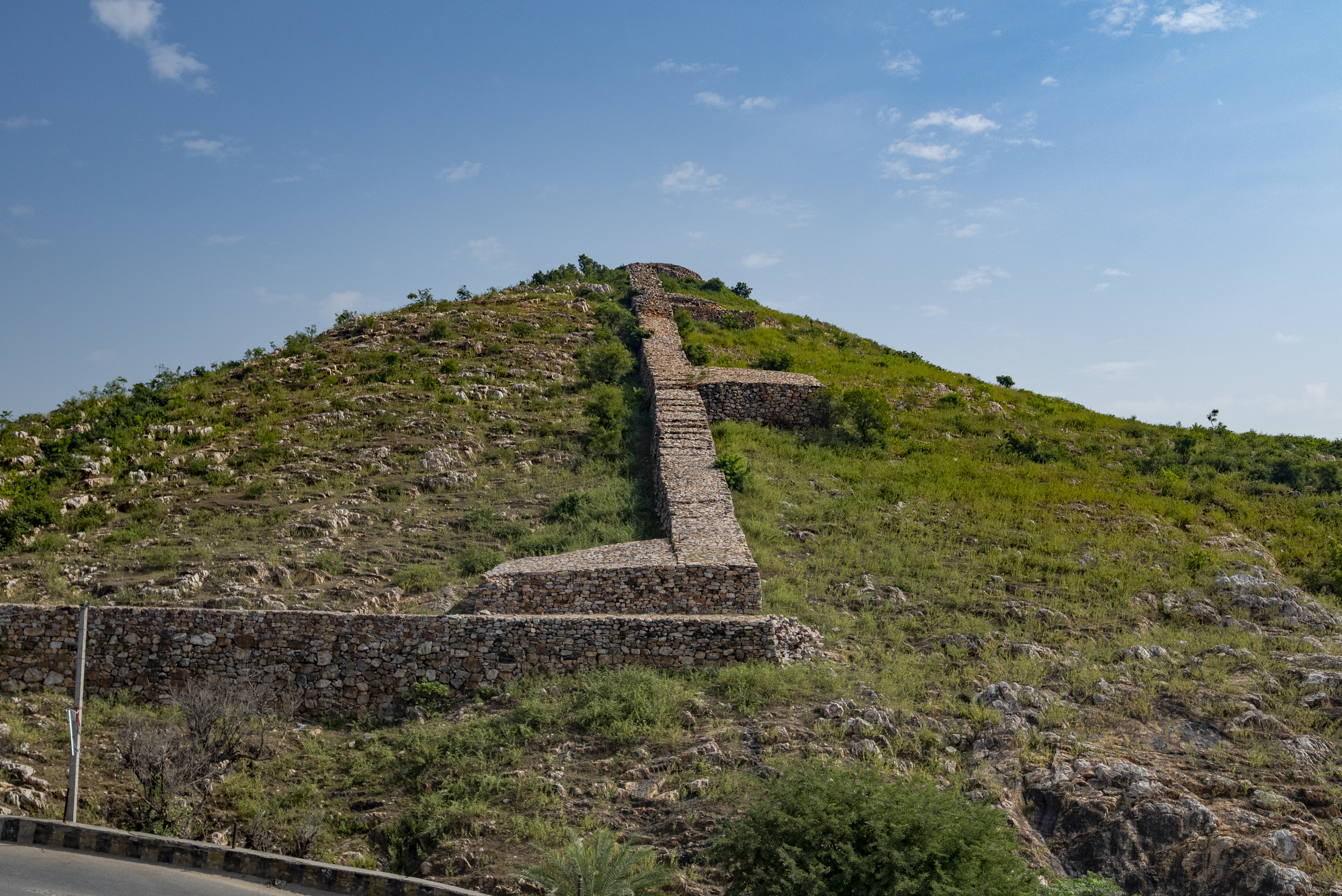
- The Cyclopean walls of Rajgir

General information
- Town or city: Rajgir
- Country: India
- Estimated completion: c. 600 BCE to c. 400 BCE
- Affiliation: Archeological Survey of India (ASI)

The Cyclopean Wall of Rajgir is a 40-kilometre-long (25 mi) wall of stone which encircled the ancient city of Rajgriha (present-day Rajgir), in the Indian state of Bihar, to protect it from external enemies and invaders. It is described as being one of the few extant structures from ancient India to have pre-Mauryan origins.

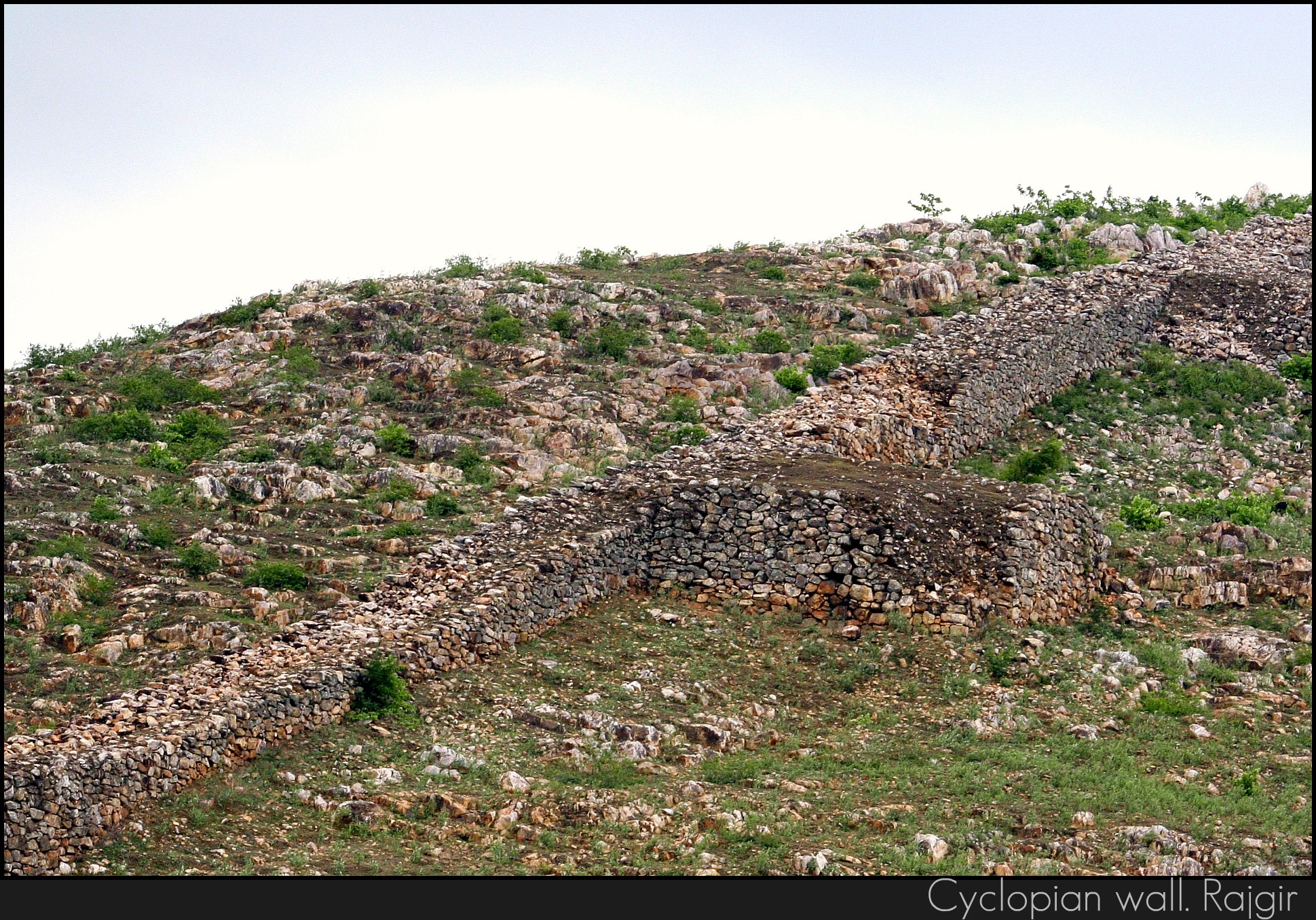
Cyclopean Wall of Rajgir which encircled the former capital of Magadha

== History ==
Rajgir was the former capital of the Magadha region. The region was initially inhabited by a possibly non-Aryan tribe known as the Kikata who are referenced in the Rig Veda. The Shatapatha Brahmana details the gradual "Aryanisation" of the region. The city of Rajgir finds its first mention in the epic, Ramayana where it is said that the son of a Brahmin named Vasu was said to have laid the cities foundations. However the Mahabharata states that the city of Rajgir was founded by Brihadratha. Buddhist texts written in the Pali language describe the city of Rajgir as being well-guarded and encircled by five hills. The cyclopean walls of Rajgir were likely built in two phases with the earliest phase dating to the 6th century BCE while a later "newer" phase was built around the 1st century BCE. This process is shown by the presence of Northern Black Polished Ware artefacts at the site.

The area of Rajgir has yielded the earliest evidence of a pre-Mauryan fortification within India with the walls forming part of the citadel. The area is historically important and is closely associated with the life of the Buddha and also has non-Buddhist associations. It was erected by the early Magadha rulers of Haryanka dynasty King Bimbisara and completed by his son and successor King Ajatasattu using massive undressed stones.

== Condition ==
Only some portions of it remain. Most of the original structure has disappeared with time. The wall is currently designated as a national monument, and the Bihar Archaeological Department has recommended to the Archaeological Survey of India that it should be included in the list of UNESCO World Heritage Sites.

The walls measure at a height of 11-12 ft in height and a width of 14-17 ft. It is possible that the height of the walls were reduced over time and the stones used to build it were locally sourced.
