= Rajgir Zoo Safari =

- Date opened: 16 February 2022
- Location: Rajgir, Nalanda district, Bihar, India
- Land area: 191.12 hectares (472.26 acres)
- No. of animals: over 250
- Owner: Department of Environment, Forest and Climate Change, Government of Bihar
- Public transit: Rajgir railway station, Gaya International Airport, Jay Prakash Narayan Airport (Patna)
- Website: https://rajgirsafari.bihar.gov.in

The Rajgir Zoo Safari or Rajgir Wildlife Safari is a Wildlife safari located in Rajgir, Bihar, India, that opened to public on 16 February 2022.

The zoo safari has been developed by the Department of Environment, Forest and Climate Change, Govt of Bihar at a cost of nearly ₹177 crore (US$18 million). The zoo safari is spread over 191 hectares (470 acres) and has five zones namely Herbivore Safari, Bear Safari, Leopard Safari, Tiger Safari and Lion Safari which accommodate over 250 herbivores and carnivores. The main wild animal species includes Chital, Sambar, Black buck, Hog Deer, Barking Deer, Wild Boar, Sloth Bear, Indian Leopard, Royal Bengal Tiger and Asiatic Lion. Considered to be one of its kind, the Zoo Safari has natural forest varying from large grasslands and bamboo thickets to dense Sal Forest. Visitors can also enjoy seeing variety of bird and butterfly species here. One can see different water birds like kingfishers, cormorants in the natural ponds present in the safari. Apart from watching wild animals in forest, efforts has been taken to sensitise the visitors about wildlife and their conservation. One of its main attraction is a selfie point with life-size wild animal statues. It has an interpretation centre with videos of wild animals. It also has a painting series showing Wildlife in their habitat, challenges faced by Wildlife for survival and role of forest department in Forest and wildlife Conservation. It also has a digital butterfly zone, an orientation centre, and a 180 degree 3D theatre.

== Location ==
The zoo is located in the Nalanda district, around 85 km southeast of Patna. It is surrounded by the Vaibhargiri and Swarnagiri hills on both side. It is about half a kilometre from the Rajgir-Gaya road in Rajgir Wildlife Sanctuary.

It is 101 km (approx) from the Bihar Capital City, Patna by Road. The nearest airport to the safari is Gaya Airport which is 71 km from the safari by road. The safari is also accessible through the Railway Station. The nearest Railway Station is Rajgir Railway station. Gaya Railway station is 60 km away from the Safari by Road.

== Features ==
The zoo has a fence for keeping the fawns, cubs, and sick animals safe, feeding areas for both the herbivores and carnivores, and another fence to rule out any possibility of the safari animals escaping to the adjoining forest areas. There are also ponds of water for the safari animals to drink from and a security arrangement with watch towers.

== Attractions ==
It would be carved out of the existing forest area and would be divided into five broad zones one each for lion, tiger, leopard, bear, herbivores, aviary zone for birds and a small butterfly park and a microtelescope will be install on Vulture peak mountain to watch sky view of Zoo Safari.

== See also ==
- Etawah Safari Park
- Sanjay Gandhi Biological Park
