= List of characters in the Mahabharata =

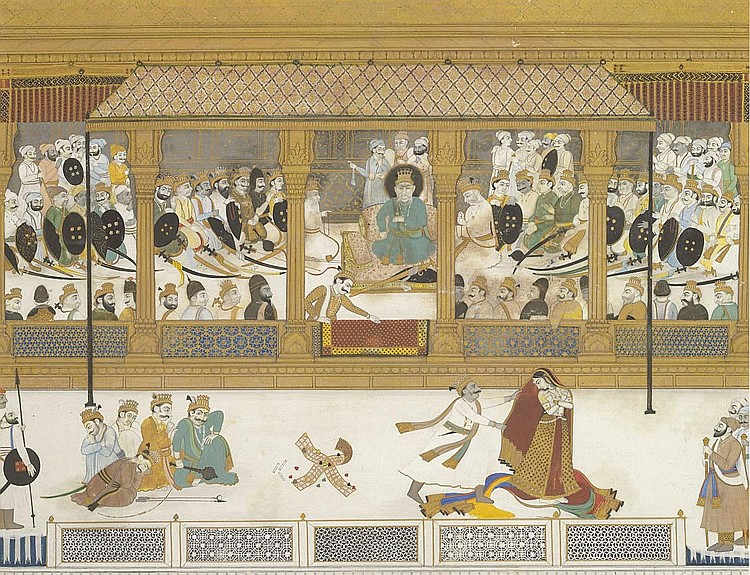
A 19th century CE miniature painting illustrating the Chira Harana (Disrobing of Draupadi) episode, featuring prominent characters (Pandavas, Draupadi, Kauravas and their main allies) in the Kuru court.

The Mahabharata is one of the two major Sanskrit epics of ancient India composed by Vyasa. At its heart lies the epic struggle between the Pandavas and the Kauravas. The central characters include the five Pandava brothers—Yudhishthira, Bhima, Arjuna, Nakula, and Sahadeva—along with their common wife Draupadi. On the opposing side, the hundred Kaurava brothers are led by their eldest brother, Duryodhana. However, the Mahabharata is richly populated with other notable figures including Krishna, Bhishma, Drona, Karna, Kunti, Kritavarma, Kripa, Dhritarashtra, Gandhari, Shakuni, Satyaki, Ashvatthama, Balarama, Vyasa, Vidura, Abhimanyu, Pandu, Satyavati, Amba, etc.

The Mahabharata manuscripts exist in numerous versions, wherein the specifics and details of major characters and episodes vary, often significantly. Except for the sections containing the Bhagavad Gita which is remarkably consistent between the numerous manuscripts, the rest of the epic exists in many versions. The differences between the Northern and Southern recensions are particularly significant, with the Southern manuscripts being more profuse and long. The manuscripts found in the North and South have "great divergence" in details, though the thematic essence is similar. Scholars have attempted to construct a critical edition, relying mostly on a study of the Mumbai edition, the Pune edition, the Kolkata edition and the South Indian editions of the Mahabharata manuscripts. The most accepted version is the one prepared by scholars led by Vishnu Sukthankar at the Bhandarkar Oriental Research Institute, preserved at the Kyoto University, the University of Cambridge and various Indian universities.

This list follows the Critical Edition of the Mahabharata, but may have characters exclusive to a particular recension. (Note: The list tries to mention as many characters as possible, but is not complete. It contains characters appearing in Harivamsa, a book connected to Mahabharata. Characters appearing in folk tales are excluded.)

== A ==
=== Adhiratha ===
Adhiratha was a charioteer from Anga and the foster-father of Karna. According to the Bhagavata Purana, Adhiratha was descended from Yayati and therefore was related to Krishna. He was also the descendant of Romapada, the king of Anga and brother-in-law of Dasharatha's descendant Shighra, king of Ayodhya. His wife was Radha and their biological sons were Shatrunjaya and Chitrasena.

=== Adrika ===
Adrika was an apsara, who was cursed to become a fish and only to be liberated when she gives birth to a human. Adrika, as a fish, lived in the Yamuna River. Once she came into contact with the semen of Uparichara Vasu and impregnated herself. After 10 months, some fishermen caught her, cut open her womb and found two children, namely Matsyagandha (Satyavati) and Matsya (Satya). After the incident, Adrika was liberated from her curse and returned to heaven.

=== Alambusha ===
Alambusha was a Rakshasa. In the Kurukshetra War, he fought from the Kaurava side. During the war, he defeated Iravan, the son of the Pandava king Arjuna. Later on the 14th day of the Kurukshetra war, Alambusha was killed by Bhima's demon son, Ghatotkacha.

=== Alayudha ===
He was a demon and the friend of another demon named Alambusha. He and Alambusha were killed by Bhima's demon son Ghatotkacha during the night time battle on the fourteenth day of the war.

=== Amitaujas ===
Amitaujas is the mighty warrior of Panchala Kingdom. He was a Maharatha on the side of Pandavas.

=== Ashvapati ===
A king of Madra and the father of Savitri.

=== Ayu ===
Ayu or Ayus was an ancestor of Shantanu. He was a son of Pururavas and his apsara wife, Urvashi. He married Prabha, an asura princess (daughter of Svarbhanu). He was succeeded by his son Nahusha.

=== Ayoda Dhaumya ===
Ayoda Dhaumya/Dhaumya was a sage of Avanti. He had three disciples namely Uddālaka Āruṇi of Panchala, Upamanyu and Veda. He even accompanied the Pandavas into the forest of Kurujanghala during their exile. He sang the songs of the Samaveda referring to Yama.

== B ==
=== Balandhara ===
Balandhara, sometimes also written as Valandhara, was the princess of Kāśī, daughter of King Devesha and wife of Bhima. They both had a son Sarvaga, who became the King of Kashi after the Kurukshetra War. Sarvaga's granddaughter Vapusthama married Janamejaya, the great-grandson of Arjuna, and bore him two sons – Shatanika and Sahashranika.

=== Banasena ===
He was a son of Karna. He was an excellent mace wielder. On the 16th day of the war, Banasena was fighting with Bhima and later killed.

=== Bhadra and Madira ===
Bhadra and Madira were 3rd and 4th wives of Vasudeva. They were the daughters of Giribhanu/Sumukha and Padmavati/Pataladevi, and elder sisters of Yashoda. Bhadra's sons were Upanidhi, Gada and Keshi. Madira's sons were Nanda, Upananda, Kritaka and Shura. They cremated themselves with Vasudeva.

=== Bhadrakali ===
Bhadrakali is the fierce form of Parvati. To destroy Daksha's yajna, She appeared with Shiva as Virabhadra and destroyed it successfully with their bhuta ganas. She also mentioned in Shalya Parva, when she was the one of followers of Kartikeya.

=== Bhima of Vidarbha ===
In the Vana Parva of the epic, sage Markandeya narrated the story of Nala and Damayanti. Bhima was the king of Vidarbha and the father of Damayanti.

=== Brihadashva ===
A sage who councels Yudhishthira during his exile, narrates Nalopakhyana and blesses Yudhishthira with skill in dicing.

== C ==
=== Chandravarma Kamboja ===
Chandravarma Kamboja is the first Kamboja king of solar race mentioned by name in the Mahābhārata. He appears to have been an ancient very powerful and renowned (Vikhyata) ruler of the Kambojas. He finds mention in the Adi Parva section of the epic Mahabharata, where he is stated to be an Asura ruler.

=== Chekitana ===
Chekitana was the son of Kekaya king Dhrishtaketu and Queen Shrutakirti, a Yadava king. He was the leader of Andhaka tribe of the Yadavas. Chekitana was described to be a valorous warrior, who fought with warriors like Susharma, Kripa and Drona. He also rescued Nakula from the clutches of Duryodhana. On the 18th day, he was killed by Duryodhana.

=== Chitra and Chitrasena ===
Chitra and Chitrasena were brothers and the two kings of the Abhisara Kingdom. Both of them sided with the Kauravas in the Kurukshetra War. Chitra was killed by Prativindhya on the 16th day, whereas Chitrasena was killed by Shrutakarma on the same day.

=== Chitrāngada (Gandharva) ===
Chitrangada was a Gandharva who was jealous of Shantanu and Satyavati's son Chitrangada, for sharing the same name. One day, the Gandharva challenged the prince and killed him in a battle.

=== Chitrāngada of Kalinga ===
Chitrāngada was the king of the Kalinga kingdom. In the Shanti Parva of the epic, Narada narrated that Chitrangada's daughter (Bhanumati) was married with the Kaurava king Duryodhana. After him, Shrutayudha became the king of Kalinga as he had no son. Possibly, his wife was Chandramudra.

=== Chitravahana ===
He was the king of Manipura and the father of Chitrangada. He was also the grandfather of Babhruvahana.

== D ==
=== Danda and Dandadhara ===
Danda and Dandadhara is the two princes of Magadha. They fought the side of Kauravas and killed by Arjuna during Kurukshetra war.

=== Darada ===
Darada is the king of Bahlika. Shishupala eulogized him when he was born the earth was cleaved because of his weight.

=== Dasharaja ===
Dasharaja was the fisherman chieftain of Hastinapura and the father of Satyavati. He was the one who asked Satyavati's heir to be the ruler of Hastinapur, due to which Bhishma took a vow of celibacy and a vow not to rule Hastinapur. He is a foster-great-great-grandfather of the Pandavas and the Kauravas.

=== Devika ===
Devika was the daughter of Govasena, the king of the Sivi kingdom of Shaivya tribe, and the second wife of Yudhishthira they got married in a self choice ceremony. They had a son called Yaudheya.

=== Dhrishtaketu of Kekeya ===
Dhrishtaketu was the ruler of Kekeya, and his wife was Shrutakirti, a Yadava who was the daughter of Shurasena. Many of Dhrishtaketu's sons participated in the Kurukshetra War, participating on both sides. Vrihadkshatra and Chekitana were two of his notable sons. Dhrishtaketu's daughter Bhadra was married to Krishna, who bore him many sons.

=== Durga ===
Durga is also mentioned in the Mahabharata. In Virata Parva and Bhishma Parva of the epic, she was eulogized by Yudhishthira and Arjuna.

=== Durmasena ===
Durmasena was the son of Dushasana. He helped his father many times in the Kurukshetra war. He was also present inside the Chakravyuha on the thirteenth day of the war. He was deprived of his chariot by Abhimanyu and saved by Ashvatthama by cutting Abhimanyu's arrow in mid air. After that, Durmasena killed brutally injured Abhimanyu in a mace duel. On 14th day, Durmasena was brutally killed by Draupadi's sons, the Draupadeyas, in revenge for Abhimanyu.

== G ==
=== Gandhari ===
==== Gandhari's maid ====
The chief maid of Gandhari was the mother of Yuyutsu. When Gandhari was pregnant for more than nine months as two years before giving birth to a lump of flesh cut into 101 pieces and incubated in 101 pots of ghrita for two years, Dhritrashtra, in fear that there would be no heir for him, impregnated the maid named as Sughada. Later Gandhari gave birth to the 100 Kauravas with Duhsala and Sughada gave birth to Yuyutsu.

== H ==
=== Hanuman ===
Unlike in the Ramayana, Hanuman does not have a large role in Mahabharata. He appears during the exile of Pandavas. In the story, Bhima, Hanuman's foster-brother, performed a penance to gain more strength. Hanuman wanted to test Bhima and appeared as a normal monkey in front of him. The monkey asked Bhima to lift his tail if he believed in his strength. But, Bhima was not able to lift the tail. Later, he realised who the monkey was and apologized. Hanuman then taught battle-skills to Bhima for some time.

=== Haryyashva ===
A king of Ayodhya, contemporary to Yayati, and one of the husbands of Madhavi with whom he had a son named Vasumanas.

=== Hayagriva ===
Hayagriva was the horse headed incarnation numbered ninth in the Dashavatara of Vishnu. He incarnated to slay the demons named Madhu-Kaitabha and successfully killed both of them by beheading through the Sudarshana Chakra and later, he brings the Vedas to Brahma.

== I ==
=== Indra ===
In the epic, Indra appears numerous times. He is the son of sage Kashyapa and one of his wives, Aditi. He was the reason for the separation of Urvashi and Pururavas. During his temporary absence, Nahusha took his place as king of Heaven. He is the third god to be invoked by Kunti to bear a child on behalf of king Pandu. Thus, he sires one of the epic's protagonists, Arjuna. He helps the Pandavas build their capital which is named Indraprastha in his honor. Later in the epic, he is shown protecting his friend Takshaka's forest from Agni, Arjuna and Krishna. During the exile of the Pandavas, Arjuna came to meet him. During the Kurukshetra war, he took the indestructible armor and earrings from Karna and, after destroying that with his thunderbolt, gave him a powerful weapon named the Vasavi Shakti that killed Ghatotkacha.

== J ==
=== Janapadi ===
Janapadi is an Apsara, who once roamed in the forests. One day, upon seeing her, Sharadvan, son of Gautama Maharishi and Ahalya discharged his seed to her seed. From his and her seeds, Kripa and Kripi were born.

=== Jara ===
Jara was a demoness. When King Brihadratha and his two queens threw away their half-bodied child into the forest, Jara joined the two halves and united their son whole. The child was named Jarasandha.

=== Jatasura ===
According to the Vana Parva of Mahabharata, Jatasura was a demon. He attacked the Pandavas in there exile. Then Bhima killed him.

== K ==
=== Kalaratri ===
Kalaratri is the seventh among the Navadurga. She is stated in Sauptika Parva. When she appears to the Pandava soldiers in dreams, she appears amidst the fighting during an attack by Drona's son Ashvatthama.

=== Kalki ===
Kalki is the final tenth incarnation of the preserver deity, Vishnu. He is stated in Vana Parva of the epic, to incarnate at the end of the Kali Yuga and protect dharma, by destroying the sinners and Mlecchas.

=== Kanika ===
Kanika was a sage of Hastinapur. He acted as a counselor to Dhritarashtra. When Yudhishthira was announced the crown prince, Dhritarashtra became sad for his sons were deceived. And at this time Kanika was summoned to counsel the king, who advised Dhritarashtra not to resort to fight but remove his foes secretly. Unethical methods may also be adopted for killing a foe, was his advice. Then he narrated a story of a jackal, who deceived his companions (tiger, mongoose, wolf, and mouse) by tricking them. Influenced by his counsels, Dhritarashtra exiled the Pandavas to Varanavata and constructed the house of lac.

=== Karenumati ===
Karenumati was the daughter of king of Chedi, Shishupala and the sister of his son Dhrishtaketu and his three younger brothers. She was the wife of Nakula.

=== Karna ===
==== Karna's adoptive brothers ====
Adhiratha and Radha, the adoptive parents of Karna, had some biological children. Karna's adoptive brothers were killed during the Kurukshetra War.

==== Karna's unnamed wives ====
In the original Mahabharata, there are some mentions of Karna's wives. Their names are not revealed, but it is described that they belonged to Suta (charioteer) community.

==== Sons of Karna ====
Karna's sons were Vrishasena, Vrishaketu, Banasena, Chitrasena, Satyasena, Sushena, Shatrunjaya, Dvipata, and Prasena. All except for Vrishaketu were killed in the war.

=== Kashya ===
Kashya was a king of the Kashi Kingdom and father to Amba, Ambika, and Ambalika.

=== Kauravas ===
The names of the 100 Kauravas are:

- Duryodhana
- Dushasana
- Duhsaha
- Duhshala
- Durmukha
- Vivinsati
- Vikarna
- Jalasandha
- Sulochna
- Vinda
- Anuvinda
- Durdharsha
- Suvahu
- Dushpradharshana
- Durmarshana
- Dushkarna
- Karna
- Chitra
- Vipachitra
- Chitraksha
- Charuchitra
- Angada
- Durmada
- Dushpradharsha
- Vivitsu
- Vikata
- Sama
- Urananabha
- Padmanabha
- Nanda
- Upanandaka
- Sanapati
- Sushena
- Kundodara
- Mahodara
- Chitravahu
- Chitravarman
- Suvarman
- Durvirochana
- Ayovahu
- Mahavahu
- Chitrachapa
- Sukundala
- Bhimavega
- Bhimavala
- Valaki
- Bhimavikrama
- Ugrayudha
- Bhimasara
- Kanakayu
- Dridhayudha
- Dridhavarman
- Dridhakshatra
- Somakirti
- Anadara
- Jarasandha
- Dridhasandha
- Satyasandha
- Sahasravadha
- Ugrasravas
- Ugrasena
- Kshemamurti
- Aparajita
- Panditaka
- Visalaksha
- Duradhara
- Dridhahasta
- Suhasta
- Vatavega
- Suvarchasa
- Adityaketu
- Vahvasin
- Nagadatta
- Anuyaina
- Nishangi
- Kuvachi
- Dandi
- Dandadhara
- Dhanugraha
- Ugra
- Bhimaratha
- Vira
- Viravahu
- Alolupa
- Abhaya
- Raudrakarman
- Dridharatha
- Anadhrishya
- Kundaveda
- Viravi
- Dhirghalochana
- Dirghavahu
- Mahavahu
- Vyudhoru
- Kanakangana
- Kundaja
- Chitraka
- Karna
- Dhurdiman
- Virajas

=== Kauravya ===
He was the father of Ulupi and grandfather of Iravan.

=== Kratha ===
Kratha is the Kshatriya king and the reincarnation of Rahu. He fought the side of Kauravas and killed by a Kulinda king during Kurukshetra war.

=== Kripi ===
Kripi was the sister of Kripa. She and her brother were adopted by King Shantanu. Her actual parents were Sharadvan and Janapadi. She married Drona, who was poor at that time. When they wanted a powerful son, they prayed to Shiva, and a son named Ashvatthama was born.

=== Kuntibhoja ===
In Mahabharata, Kuntibhoja was the cousin of Shurasena and adoptive father of Kunti. He was the ruler of the Kunti kingdom. Kunti was a daughter of King Shurasena but was later given to Kuntibhoja since he was devoid of children. Kuntibhoja raised her as his own daughter and loved her. She was very beautiful and intelligent and later married Pandu. When Kunti was a young girl, the sage Durvasa visited Kuntibhoja one day and sought his hospitality. The king entrusted the sage to Kunti's care and tasked Kunti with the responsibility of serving the sage and meeting all his needs during his stay with them. Eventually, the sage was gratified. Before departing, he rewarded Kunti by teaching her Atharvaveda mantras which enabled her to invoke any deva of her choice to beget children by them. His son Visharada succeeded him who was killed by Duryodhana on the eighth day.

=== Kuru ===
Kuru is the name of the ancestor of the clan of the Kurus in the Mahabharata. He was the son of Samvarana and of Tapati, the daughter of the Sun.

In the literature, Kuru is an ancestor of Pandu and his descendants, the Pandavas, and also of Dhritarashtra and his descendants, the Kauravas. This latter name, derived as a patronym from "Kuru", is only used for the descendants of Dhritarashtra.

King Kuru had two wives named Shubhangi and Vahini. He had a son named Viduratha with Shubhangi, and five sons with Vahini, named Ashvavata, Abhishyata, Chitraratha, Muni, and Janamejaya. Due to his merits and great ascetic practices the region "Kurujanghala" was named after him. It has also been known as Kurukshetra since ancient Vedic times.

== M ==
=== Manimat ===
Manimat or Maniman is the king who was the rebirth of Vritra, the son of Danu. He fought the side of Pandavas and killed by Bhurishravas in the Kurukshetra war.

== N ==
=== Niramitra ===
Niramitra was the son of Nakula and his wife Karenumati.

== P ==
=== Padmavati ===
Padmavati, mentioned in Shalya Parva of the epic, is one of the followers of Kartikeya.

=== Pandya ===
He is the king of Pandya Kingdom. He came to help the Pandavas with an army and also an maharathi on the side of Pandavas.

=== Paurava ===
Paurava is a king and the rebirth of Asura Sharabha. He fought the side of Kauravas and was killed by Arjuna during Kurukshetra war

=== Prativindhya ===
Prativindhya was the son of Yudhishthira and Draupadi. He was the eldest brother among Draupadeyas.

=== Prishati ===
Prishati (lit. daughter-in-law of Prishata) is the chief-queen of King Drupada and the mother of Shikhandi, Dhristadyumna and Draupadi. After Drupada performed a yajna (fire-sacrifice) to obtain a powerful son, she was asked by the sages to consume the sacrificial offering to conceive a child. However, Prishati had perfumed saffron in her mouth and requested the sages to wait till she had a bath and washed her mouth. The sages criticised her untimely request and poured the offering into the flames of the yajna, from which Dhrishtadhyumna and Draupadi emerged. Overwhelmed by their arrival, Prishati requested the sages to declare her as the mother of Dhrishtadyumna and Draupadi.

=== Purochana ===
Purochana was the chief royal architect in Hastinapura and the builder of the Lakshagriha. He was a friend of Shakuni and Duryodhana. Gaining the king's consent, Duryodhana instructed the architect to build a palace using flammable lacquer, and set it aflame on a designated day to assassinate the sleeping Pandavas and their mother Kunti. At court, Dhritarashtra encouraged the Pandavas to visit the town of Varanavata and attend its festivities. Yudhishthira suspected the ulterior motives of the king, but found himself unable to refuse his bidding. Before their departure, their uncle, the minister Vidura, cryptically warned Yudhishthira of the plot against their lives in a Mleccha language, and a means of escape. After a year had passed, Yudhishthira organized a festival within the palace, inviting the people of the town. Purochana grew inebriated and fell asleep. After the attendees of the festivities had departed, Yudhishthira ordered his brother, Bhima, to set the Lakshagriha aflame, after which they escaped through a tunnel with Kunti. The casualties of this fire were Purochana, a nishada woman and her five sons, who had also fallen unconscious due to their inebriation.

== R ==
=== Radha ===
Radha was the foster mother of Karna, one of the central characters in the Hindu epic Mahabharata. She was the wife of Adiratha, the charioteer of Dhritarashtra. Radha also bore a son named Shona. The young Kunti used a mantra to beget a son from the Sun god Surya. Afraid of the taint of being an unwed mother, she placed the baby in a basket and set him afloat a river. The child later known as Karna was found and adopted by Radha and Adiratha, who raised Karna as their own. Karna is known by the matronymic Radheya. Karna, once he knows from Krishna and Kunti about his birth secret, having done so much harm to his brothers Pandavas, was in no position to abandon Duryodhana.

=== Ramopakhyana characters ===
The Mahabharata also contains an abridged retelling of the Ramayana, known as Ramopakhyana. Therefore, Rama, Sita, Lakshmana, Ravana and other characters of the Ramayana also appear in the Mahabharata.

=== Rochamana ===
Rochamana was the kshatriya king of the Ashvamedha kingdom. He was a warrior on the side of Pandavas and killed by Karna in the Kurukshetra war.

=== Ruru ===
Ruru was a rishi (sage) of the epic Mahabharata. He was the son of Pramati and Ghritachi, the celestial dancer and a descendant of Bhrigu. Ruru married Pramadvara, foster-daughter of sage Sthulakesha. He was the father of Sunaka.

== S ==
=== Sakradeva ===
He was son of King Shrutayudha and Queen Sakrayani of Kalinga. He was the yuvaraja (crown prince) of Kalinga. He was killed by Bhima on the second day of war along with many soldiers, and two generals, Satya and Satyadeva.

=== Salva ===
Salva was the king of the Salva kingdom. He and Amba, the princess of Kashi, fell in love, and Amba decided to choose him during her svayamvara. However, Bhishma won the princesses for his brother Vichitravirya. When Amba told Bhishma about her love, he sent her with honour to Salva. But Salva rejected her and told her that he would not be able marry her as she had been won by Bhishma.

=== Samudrasena ===
Samudrasena is a king. Once, Bhima defeated Samudrasena and his son, Chandrasena, during his war of conquest. In the Kurukshetra War, he fought on the side of the Pandavas and was killed by the Kaurava army.

=== Satyajit ===
Satyajit was one of the ten sons of King Drupada of Panchala.

=== Savitri (goddess) ===
Savitri is the consort of Brahma, who blesses King Ashvapati with a daughter named in the goddess's honour.

=== Senavindu ===
Senavindu, also called as Senabindu, is a king and the rebirth of the asura Tuhunda. Arjuna twice defeated this king during his digvijaya. He is stated by Drupada as one of the kings who could be summoned to the cause of the Pandavas in the Kurukshetra War. He was killed by the Kauravas in the war.

=== Shalya ===
==== Sons of Shalya ====
Shalya's three sons were Madranjaya, Rukmanagada, and Rukmanaratha. Madranjaya was the eldest than other two with a gap of 10 years. Rukmanagada and Rukmanaratha were twins. Madranjaya was killed on 2nd day of war by Virata and other two were killed by Abhimanyu inside the chakravyuha on 13th day.

=== Shamika ===
Shamika is a sage featured in the epic. One day, while hunting, Parikshit had wounded a deer, but lost it in the woods. Searching for it, fatigued, he asked the meditating Shamika about the deer. The sage did not answer as he was observing the vow of silence. This angered the king, who placed a dead snake on Shamika's shoulder. Sringin, the son of Shamika, enraged by this act, cursed Parikshit to be killed by Takshaka (snake) within seven days.

=== Shankha ===
Shankha was third son of King Virata. He was killed by Bhishma on the very first day of the war.

=== Shatanika ===
Shatanika was the son of Nakula and Draupadi. He was the third brother among the Draupadeyas.

=== Shaunaka ===
Shaunaka headed the sages during their conclave at his twelve-year sacrifice, where Ugrashravas Sauti recited the Mahabharata.

=== Shishupala ===
==== Sons of Shishupala ====
The four sons of Chedi King Shishupala were Dhrishtaketu, Mahipala, Suketu, Sarabha. They had a sister named Karenumati who was younger than Dhrishtaketu but elder than other three. Dhrishtaketu succeeded the throne of Chedi after Shishupala's death. Dhrishtaketu was killed by Drona on 6th day of war and other three were killed by Shakuni's son Vrikasura.

=== Shreniman ===
Shreniman was a king. He ruled the Kumaradesa. Nakula defeated him during his digvijaya. In the Kurukshetra War, he fought on the side of the Pandavas and was killed by Drona.

=== Shrutakarma ===
Shrutakarma was the son of Arjuna and Draupadi. He was the youngest brother among the Draupadeyas.

=== Shrutasena ===
Shrutasena was the son of Sahadeva and Draupadi. He was the fourth brother among Draupadeyas.

=== Shukra ===
Shukra is the son of sage Bhrigu and his wife Kavyamata. After the devas killed his mother (who was later revived), Shukra developed a deep hatred towards the devas and became the guru of the asuras. He had a daughter named Devayani, who was married to the king Yayati. But Yayati had an affair with Devayani's maid, Sharmishtha. This led Shukra to curse Yayati to lose his youth.

=== Shveta ===
He was the second son of Virata, also called Shvetavarman. He was killed on the first day of the war by Bhishma.

=== Shvetaki ===
Shvetaki was a king who performed numerous yajnas. He is the reason of the destruction of the Khandava forest (Khandava Dahana).

=== Subala ===
Subala was the father of Shakuni and Gandhari. He was the King of Gandhara, who attended Yudhishthira's Rajasuya.

=== Sugadha ===
The chief maid of Gandhari, named Sugadha, was the mother of Yuyutsu. When Gandhari was pregnant for more than nine months, Dhritrashtra, in fear that there would be no heir for him, impregnated the maid Sugadha. Later Gandhari gave birth to the 100 Kauravas and Sughada gave birth to Yuyutsu.

=== Sunaka ===
Sunaka was the son of Sage Ruru and Pramadvara. This royal sage was a member of Yudhishthira's assembly. He received a sword from King Harivamsha and presented it to the king Ushinara.

=== Susharma ===
Susharma was the king of the Trigarta Kingdom. He supported the Kauravas in the war. He was a friend of Duryodhana. He was killed by Arjuna on the fourteenth day of the war.

=== Sutasoma ===
Sutasoma was the son of Bhima and Draupadi. He was the second brother among the Draupadeyas.

=== Svarbhanvi ===
Svarbhanvi, called Indumati in later texts, was the daughter of Asura Svarbhanu, who later became Rahu and Ketu. She married Ayu, son of Pururavas of lunar dynasty, and had a son named Nahusha.

== U ==
=== Ushinara ===
A king of Bhojas, contemporary to Yayati, and one of the husbands of Madhavi with whom he had a son named Shibi.

== V ==
=== Vajra ===
He was the son of Aniruddha. Vajra was crowned as the King of Indraprastha on the request of Krishna by the Pandavas after the Yadava fratricide just before the Pandavas' journey to Mount Sumeru.

=== Vapusthama ===
Vapusthama was the princess of Kāśī, the daughter of Subarnavarma, the granddaughter of King Sarvaga and great-granddaughter of Bhima, the second Pandava. Vapusthama was married to Arjuna's great-grandson Janamejaya, and bore him two sons – Shatanika and Sankukarna.

=== Varaha ===
Varaha is the boar-incarnation of Vishnu numbered third in the Dashavatara, stated in Vana Parva of the epic, when he rescued Bhumi during the Pralaya (foremost destruction).

=== Varga ===
During his journey to the south, Arjuna encounters five sacred waters inhabited by cursed crocodiles that frighten away ascetics. Ignoring warnings, he enters one of the waters, and is attacked by a crocodile, which he overpowers and drags to the shore. The creature transforms into Varga, an apsara (celestial nymph), who reveals that she and four other apsaras—Saurabhi, Samichi, Budabuda and Lata—had been cursed to become crocodiles for attempting to seduce a young ascetic. Grateful for her release, Varga asks Arjuna to free her companions. He obliges, defeating the remaining crocodiles and liberating the Apsaras.

=== Vayu ===
Vayu is the god of wind. He is son of Aditi and Kashyapa. In the epic, he is the foster-father of Hanuman and the biological father of the second Pandava, Bhima and himself also. He was the second god called by Kunti after her marriage using a mantra as her husband Pandu could not conceive due to a curse.

=== Virabhadra ===
Virabhadra was the fierce god who incarnated from Shiva as his other form to destroy Daksha's yajna and he destroyed it too. He is also stated in the Shanti Parva of the epic Mahabharata.

=== Vidura ===
==== Vidura's wife ====
The wife of Vidura, the half-brother of King Dhritarashtra and the Prime Minister of Hastinapur. She was also a chaste woman of supreme order. She too had a high degree of devotion and abdication. When Krishna visited Hastinapur as an emissary of Pandavas, he had not accepted Duryodhana's request to stay in his palace but instead he chose to stay at Vidura's home and accepted a simple meal there. She is named Sulabha in later versions of the Mahabharata. Sulabha was a great devotee of Krishna. One day he came to her home for a surprise meal. She was enchanted by his glowing face. In absence of her husband, she offered him peels of banana instead of the fruit. And he ate them respecting her bhakti note.

=== Vijayā ===
In the Hindu epic Mahabharata, Vijaya was the daughter of king Dyutimata of Madra (Bahlika) and wife of Sahadeva. They got married in a self choice ceremony. Vijaya was Nakula's maternal uncle's daughter. They had a son Suhotra. After the Kurukshetra War, Vijaya lived in Madra.

=== Vishoka ===
Vishoka was the charioteer of Pandava Bhima during the Kurukshetra War.

=== Vridhakshtra ===
He was the former king of Sindhu Kingdom. He was father of Jayadratha and Vijayadratha. He later became a rishi. When Arjuna beheaded his son Jayadratha, his head came on his lap while he was doing tapasya and when he stood up and Jayadratha's head blasted, it was killing Vridhakshtra very unexpectedly.

== Y ==
=== Yama ===
In the epic, the death god Yama, who is also called as the law god Dharma is the biological father of Yudhishthira and himself also. He was the first god invoked by Kunti after her marriage using a mantra as her husband Pandu could not conceive due to a curse. Yama also appeared in the tale of Savitri and Satyavan. In the story, he tried to take Satyavan's soul during his predestined time of death, but Savitri was able to persuade the deity to let her husband live. Yama as Dharma, later in the epic, appears testing Yudhishthira by taking form of a yaksha. When the Pandavas and Draupadi departed to heaven, he accompanied them by taking the form of a dog and was the only survivor left, along with Yudhishthira. In the end, he showed his true form to Yudhishthira and merged with him after his death by bathing in the celestial Ganga river near Mount Meru.

=== Yaudheya ===
Yaudheya was the son of Yudhishthira and Devika, and the grandson of Govasena, who was the king of Sivi kingdom. Yaudheya succeeded his grandfather after his death in the Kurukshetra War.

According to the Matsya Purana, Yaudheya is also the name of the eldest son of Prativindhya and his first wife Subala, however he does not succeed Yudhishthira to the throne of Hastinapura as he inherits his maternal kingdom.

== See also ==
- List of avatars in the Mahabharata
