= List of avatars in the Mahabharata =

List of beings in the Mahabharata and their avataras

The section Amshavatara Parva (1.7.a) of the Adi Parva in the Mahabharata (Critical Edition). provides a detailed account of the incarnations of Danavas, Asuras, gods, and other celestial beings into human forms, as narrated by Vaisampayana to Janamejaya, revealing the divine origins of prominent figures in the epic.

Asuras	Human Incarnation
Viprachitti (Danava)	Jarasandha
Jaya / Hiranyakashipu / Dashanan	Shishupala
Vijaya / Hiranyaksha / Kumbhakarna	Dantavakra
Samhrada (younger brother of Prahlada)	Shalya (king of the Bahlika)
Anuhrada (youngest of the brothers)	Dhrishtaketu (king)
Sibi (Daitya)	Druma (king)
Baskala (Asura)	Bhagadatta (king)
Ayashiras, Ashvashiras, Ayashanku, Gaganamurdhan, Vegavat	5 kings of the Kekayas
Ketumat (Asura)	Amitaujas (king)
Svarbhanu (Asura)	Ugrasena (king)
Ashva (Asura)	Ashoka (king)
Ashvapati (brother of Ashva)	Hardikya (king)
Vrishaparvan (Asura)	Dirghaprajna (king)
Ajaka (brother of Vrishaparvan)	Malla (king)
Ashvagriva (Asura)	Rocamana (king)
Sukshma (Asura)	Brihanta (king)
Tuhunda (Asura)	Senabindu (king)
Ishtva (Asura)	Papajit (king)
Ekacakra (Asura)	Prativindhya (king)
Virupaksha (Asura)	Citravarman (king)
Hara (Danava)	Suvastu (king)
Ahara (Asura)	Bahlika (king)
Nicandra (Asura)	Munjakesha (king)
Nikumbha (Asura)	Devadhipa (king)
Surabha (Daitya)	Paurava (king)
Shalabha (Asura)	Prahlada (Bahlika king)
Candra (Daitya)	Rishika (royal seer)
Mritapa (Asura)	Pashcimanupaka (king)
Gavishtha (Asura)	Drumasena (king)
Mayura (Asura)	King of the land Vishva
Suparna (brother of Mayura)	Kalakirti (king)
Candrahantri (Asura)	Sunaka (royal seer)
Candravinashana (Asura)	Janaki (royal seer)
Dirghajihva (Danava)	Kashiraja (king)
Kratha (son of Sirphi)	Parvateya (king)
Vasumitra (son of Anayus)	Vikshara (king)
Second brother of Vasumitra (Asura)	King of the Pamsu realm
Balavira (Asura)	Paundramatsyaka (king)
Vritra (Asura)	Manimat (king-seer)
Krodhahantri (Asura)	Danda (king)
Krodhavardhana (Asura)	Dandadhara (king)
Kaleyas (Eight Sons of Kalaka)	Jayatsena (king of the Magadhas), Aparajita (king), King of the Nishadas, Shrenimat (royal seer), Mahaujas (king), Abhiru (royal seer), Samudrasena (king), Brihat (king)
Krodhavasa group	Kings: Nandika, Karnaveshta, Siddhartha, Kitika, Suvira, Subahu, Mahavira
Divine Beings	Human incarnation
Devaka	Chief lord of the Gandharvas
Brihaspati (seer of the Gods)	Drona (son of Bharadvaja)
United portions of Mahadeva, Yama, Kama, Krodha	Ashwatthaman
Eight Vasus	Sons of Shantanu by Ganga (youngest: Bhishma)
Rudras	Kripa
Dvapara	Shakuni
Maruts	Satyaki, Drupada, Kritavarma, Virata
Gandharva king	Hamsa (son of Arishta)
Kali (malicious deity of Strife)	Duryodhana
Various Rakshasas	Duryodhana’s brothers (Kauravas, from Dushasana onward: Durmukha, Duhshaha, etc.)
Dharma (god of Justice) (Note: The Northern Recension (NR) also includes Vidura as an incarnation of Dharma in the list.)	Yudhishthira
Vayu (god of Wind)	Bhimasena
Indra (King of gods)	Arjuna
Ashvins (twin-gods)	Nakula and Sahadeva (twins)
Varchas	Abhimanyu
Agni (god of Fire)	Dhrishtadyumna
A Rakshasa	Shikhandi
Vishvadevas	Draupadeyas (Draupadi’s five sons)
Surya (god of Sun)	Karna
Narayana (Vishnu)	Krishna
Shesha	Balarama
Sanatkumara	Pradyumna
Apsaras	Sixteen thousand junior wives of Krishna
Shri (goddess of Prosperity) (Note: The Northern Recension (NR), however, assigns Shri to Rukmini and reinterprets Draupadi as Shachi, likely due to her marriage to Arjuna. Scholars view this shift (Adi Parva, Section LXVII, NR) as a later interpolation, rejecting Shri's association with Rukmini in the Critical Edition of the Mahabharata.)	Draupadi
Siddhi (goddess of Success)	Kunti
Dhriti (goddess of Endurance)	Madri
Mati (goddess of Wisdom)	Gandhari
