= List of monarchs of Magadha =

Rulers and dynasties of Magadha Kingdom in Ancient India

The Kingdom of Magadha, later known as the Magadha Empire, was a kingdom and later empire in ancient north India. Many significant houses ruled the kingdom and its empire over the centuries until it was defeated by the Satavahana Empire in c. 28 BCE.

All dates are given in a single continuous BCE calendar. The chronological anchor is the accession of Chandragupta Maurya in 321 BCE, corroborated by Greek accounts of Megasthenes and the Arthashastra. The Brihadratha total of 1000 years (per Vayu Purana and Vishnu Purana) is back-calculated from the fixed endpoint of 682 BCE (fall of Ripunjaya). A gap of approximately 138 years (682–544 BCE) exists between the last Brihadratha king and Bimbisara; Indian texts are silent on this period. Dates for the post-Sahadeva Brihadratha kings use reign lengths as given in the Vayu Purana. The Pradyota dynasty is deliberately excluded; it was based in Avanti (Ujjayini), not Magadha, and ruled concurrently as a parallel dynasty.

== House of Brihadratha ==
The Brihadratha dynasty was the first ruling house of Magadha. Brihadratha (son of Uparichara Vasu) founded this dynasty in 1682 BCE. This dynasty lasted for more than ten centuries, ruling Magadha from 1682 to 682 BCE.The Capital City of Brihadratha Dynasty was Girivraja mentioned in Mahabharata which many scholars significantly Identified this ancient capital with Modern Rajgir.

House of Brihadratha
- Royal house of Magadha
- Country: Kingdom of Magadha
- Current region: India
- Founded: c. 1682 BCE
- Founder: Brihadratha
- Final ruler: Ripunjaya
- Titles: King of Magadha
- Deposition: 682 BCE

| Sr. No. | King | Dynasty | Notes |
|---|---|---|---|
| 1 | Brihadratha I | Brihadratha dynasty | Founder of the dynasty; son of Uparichara Vasu, king of Chedi; established capital at Girivraja (modern Rajgir); the 1000-year total reign of the dynasty is back-calculated from the fall of Ripunjaya in 682 BCE |
| 2 | Kushagra | Brihadratha dynasty | Son and immediate successor of Brihadratha I |
| 3 | Amna | Brihadratha dynasty | Female successor of Kushagra; mentioned in all major Puranic recensions; one of the very few female rulers recorded in ancient Indian dynastic lists |
| 4 | Vrishava (Rishava) | Brihadratha dynasty | Son of Kushagra |
| 5 | Pushpavanta (Pushyavanta) | Brihadratha dynasty | Son of Vrishava |
| 6 | Satyahita (Satyadhrita) | Brihadratha dynasty | Son of Pushpavanta |
| 7 | Sudhanvana (Sudharmana / Dhanusha) | Brihadratha dynasty | Son of Satyahita; name has multiple variant forms across Puranic recensions — Vishnu Purana gives Sudharmana, Vayu Purana Dhanusha |
| 8 | Sarva (Urja / Jantu / Jahu) | Brihadratha dynasty | Son of Sudhanvana; the most heavily variant name in the entire list — called Urja in the Vishnu Purana, Jantu and Jahu in other recensions |
| 9 | Sambhava | Brihadratha dynasty | Son of Sarva; the Agni Purana makes him the direct father of Jarasandha, while the Vishnu Purana and Vayu Purana insert one further king (Brihadratha II) between them |
| 10 | Brihadratha II | Brihadratha dynasty | Son of Sambhava; listed between Sambhava and Jarasandha in the Vishnu and Vayu Puranas; the actual father of Jarasandha; commonly and erroneously conflated with the dynasty founder Brihadratha I |
| 11 | Jarasandha | Brihadratha dynasty | Greatest ruler of the dynasty; attacked Mathura repeatedly; killed by Bhima in single combat on the counsel of Krishna as narrated in the Sabha Parva of the Mahabharata; his capital Girivraja is identified with modern Rajgir |
| 12 | Sahadeva | Brihadratha dynasty | Son of Jarasandha; placed on the throne of Magadha by the Pandavas after his father's death; subsequently fought on the Pandava side at the Kurukshetra War; killed in battle by Shakuni |
| 13 | Somadhi (Somapi / Somphi) | Brihadratha dynasty | the post-Sahadeva succession is given with specific year-lengths in the Vayu Purana; dates are calculated continuously from the 682 BCE endpoint backward |
| 14 | Srutasravas | Brihadratha dynasty | |
| 15 | Ayutayus | Brihadratha dynasty | |
| 16 | Niramitra | Brihadratha dynasty | |
| 17 | Sukshatra | Brihadratha dynasty | |
| 18 | Brihatkarman | Brihadratha dynasty | |
| 19 | Senajit | Brihadratha dynasty | |
| 20 | Srutanjaya | Brihadratha dynasty | |
| 21 | Vipra | Brihadratha dynasty | |
| 22 | Suchi | Brihadratha dynasty | |
| 23 | Kshemya | Brihadratha dynasty | |
| 24 | Subrata (Suvrata) | Brihadratha dynasty | |
| 25 | Dharma | Brihadratha dynasty | |
| 26 | Susuma (Sushruma) | Brihadratha dynasty | |
| 27 | Dridhasena | Brihadratha dynasty | |
| 28 | Sumati | Brihadratha dynasty | |
| 29 | Subala | Brihadratha dynasty | |
| 30 | Sunita | Brihadratha dynasty | |
| 31 | Satyajit | Brihadratha dynasty | |
| 32 | Vishvajit (Viswajit) | Brihadratha dynasty | |
| 33 | Ripunjaya | Brihadratha dynasty | Last king of the dynasty; killed by his minister Punika (also called Pulika or Kulik)in approx. 682 BCE; Punika placed his son Pradyota on the throne of Avanti — not Magadha; Magadha itself passes to the Haryanka dynasty after an approximately 138-year gap in the textual record |} |

Gap of approximately 138 years (682–544 BCE) — Indian texts are silent on this period.

== House of Haryanka ==
The Haryanka dynasty was the second ruling house of Magadha. This dynasty was founded by Bimbisara in 544 BCE. This dynasty lasted for 131 years, ruling Magadha from 544 to 413 BCE.

House of Haryanka 𑀳𑀭𑁆𑀬𑀁𑀓
- Royal house of Magadha
- Country: Kingdom of Magadha
- Current region: India
- Etymology: Probably derived from clan name "Harya"
- Founded: 544 BCE
- Founder: Bimbisara
- Final ruler: Nagadasaka
- Seat: Rajagriha (later, Patliputra)
- Titles: King of Magadha
- Deposition: 413 BCE, popular rebellion

| Sr. No. | Monarchs | Dynasty | Start(BCE) | End(BCE) | Duration | Note |
|---|---|---|---|---|---|---|
| 34 | Bimbisara (Shrenika) | Haryanka dynasty | 544 | 492 | 52 | First historically verifiable king of Magadha; contemporary of both the Buddha and Mahavira; expanded Magadha through marriage alliances with Kosala, Vaishali and Madra; built royal highway from Rajgir; imprisoned and killed by his son Ajatashatru; the Haryanka dynastic name does not appear in the Puranas and is attested exclusively in Buddhist and Jain sources |
| 35 | Ajatashatru (Kunika) | Haryanka dynasty | 492 | 460 | 32 | Imprisoned and killed his father Bimbisara; waged a sixteen-year war against the Vajji confederacy; constructed the first fortifications at Pataliputra; contemporary of the Parinirvana of the Buddha |
| 36 | Udayabhadra (Udayin) | Haryanka dynasty | 460 | 444 | 16 | Son of Ajatashatru; permanently shifted the capital of Magadha from Rajgir to Pataliputra (modern Patna); also reported by Buddhist sources to have killed his father Ajatashatru |
| 37 | Aniruddha (Anurudha) | Haryanka dynasty | 444 | 436 | 8 | Reign length from the Mahavamsa |
| 38 | Munda | Haryanka dynasty | 436 | 428 | 8 | Reportedly killed his father Aniruddha; the dynasty's pattern of parricide is noted repeatedly in Buddhist chronicles |
| 39 | Nagadasaka (Darshaka) | Haryanka dynasty | 428 | 413 | 24 | Last king of the Haryanka dynasty; the dynasty's repeated parricides caused a popular revolt; the people of Magadha installed Shishunaga, a minister, on the throne in his place |

== House of Shaishunaga ==
=== Shishunaga Dynasty (~413–345 BCE) ===
The Shaishunaga dynasty, also called Shishunaga, was the third ruling house of Magadha. Shisunaga, who was originally a minister of King Nagadashaka, overthrew him in a popular rebellion and ascended the throne in 413 BCE. This dynasty lasted for only 68 years, ruling Magadha from 413 to 345 BCE.

House of Shaishunaga 𑀰𑁃𑀰𑀼𑀦𑀕
- Royal house of Magadha
- Country: Kingdom of Magadha
- Current region: India
- Founded: 413 BCE
- Founder: Shishunaga
- Final ruler: Mahanandin
- Seat: Rajgriha and Vaishali (later, Patliputra)
- Titles: King of Magadha
- Deposition: 345 BCE, assassination of King Mahanandin by Mahapadma Nanda

| # | King | Reign (years) | Approx. BCE | Notes |
|---|---|---|---|---|
| 40 | Shishunaga | 40 | 413–395 | A minister installed by popular revolt after the fall of the Haryankas; permanently destroyed the power of Avanti |
| 41 | Kalashoka (Kakavarna) | 28 | 395–367 | Presided over the Second Buddhist Council held at Vaishali (~383 BCE); the Puranas mention his ten sons who ruled either simultaneously or in quick succession after him |
| 42 | Kshemadharman | 20 | 367–347 | |
| 43 | Kshemavarman (Kshatraujas) | 8 | 347–339 | |
| 44 | Nandivardhana | 40 | 339–319 | |
| 45 | Mahanandin | 43 | 319–345 | Last king of the Shishunaga dynasty; his illegitimate son by a Shudra woman, Mahapadma Nanda, killed his half-brothers and usurped the throne, founding the Nanda dynasty |

== House of Nanda ==
=== Nanda Dynasty (~345–321 BCE) ===
Primary sources: Vishnu Purana (Book IV), Vayu Purana, the Sanskrit drama Mudrarakshasa by Vishakhadatta, and Greek accounts — Curtius and Diodorus refer to Dhana Nanda as Agrammes or Xandrames

House of Nanda 𑀦𑀁𑀤
- Imperial house of Magadha
- Country: Kingdom of Magadha
- Current region: India
- Founded: c. 345 BCE
- Founder: Mahapadma Nanda
- Final ruler: Dhana Nanda
- Titles: King of Magadha
- Deposition: 321 BCE

| # | King | Reign (years) | Approx. BCE | Notes |
|---|---|---|---|---|
| 46 | Mahapadma Nanda (Ugrasena) | 88 | 345–336 | Called "Destroyer of all Kshatriyas" (Sarvakshatranta-kara) in the Puranas; first empire-builder of pan-Indian scale;son of Mahanandin by a Shudra woman |
| 47 | Pandhuka | — | — | Son of Mahapadma Nanda |
| 48 | Panghupati | — | — | Son of Mahapadma Nanda |
| 49 | Bhutapala | — | — | Son of Mahapadma Nanda |
| 50 | Rashtrapala | — | — | Son of Mahapadma Nanda |
| 51 | Govishanaka | — | — | Son of Mahapadma Nanda |
| 52 | Dashasiddhaka | — | — | Son of Mahapadma Nanda |
| 53 | Kaivarta | — | — | Son of Mahapadma Nanda |
| 54 | Dhana Nanda | — | ~336–321 | Last of the Nanda dynasty; the Nanda king whose army Alexander's troops refused to fight (~326 BCE); overthrown by Chandragupta Maurya with the strategy of Chanakya/Kautilya as described in the Mudrarakshasa |

== House of Maurya ==
The Maurya dynasty was the sixth and greatest ruling house of Magadha. Chandragupta Maurya founded this dynasty with help of his mentor and grand advisor Chanakya in 322 BCE after organizing a large army and overthrowing King Dhana Nanda subsequently ruling Magadha from 322 to 184 BCE.

House of Maurya 𑀫𑁅𑀭𑁆𑀬
- Imperial house of Magadha
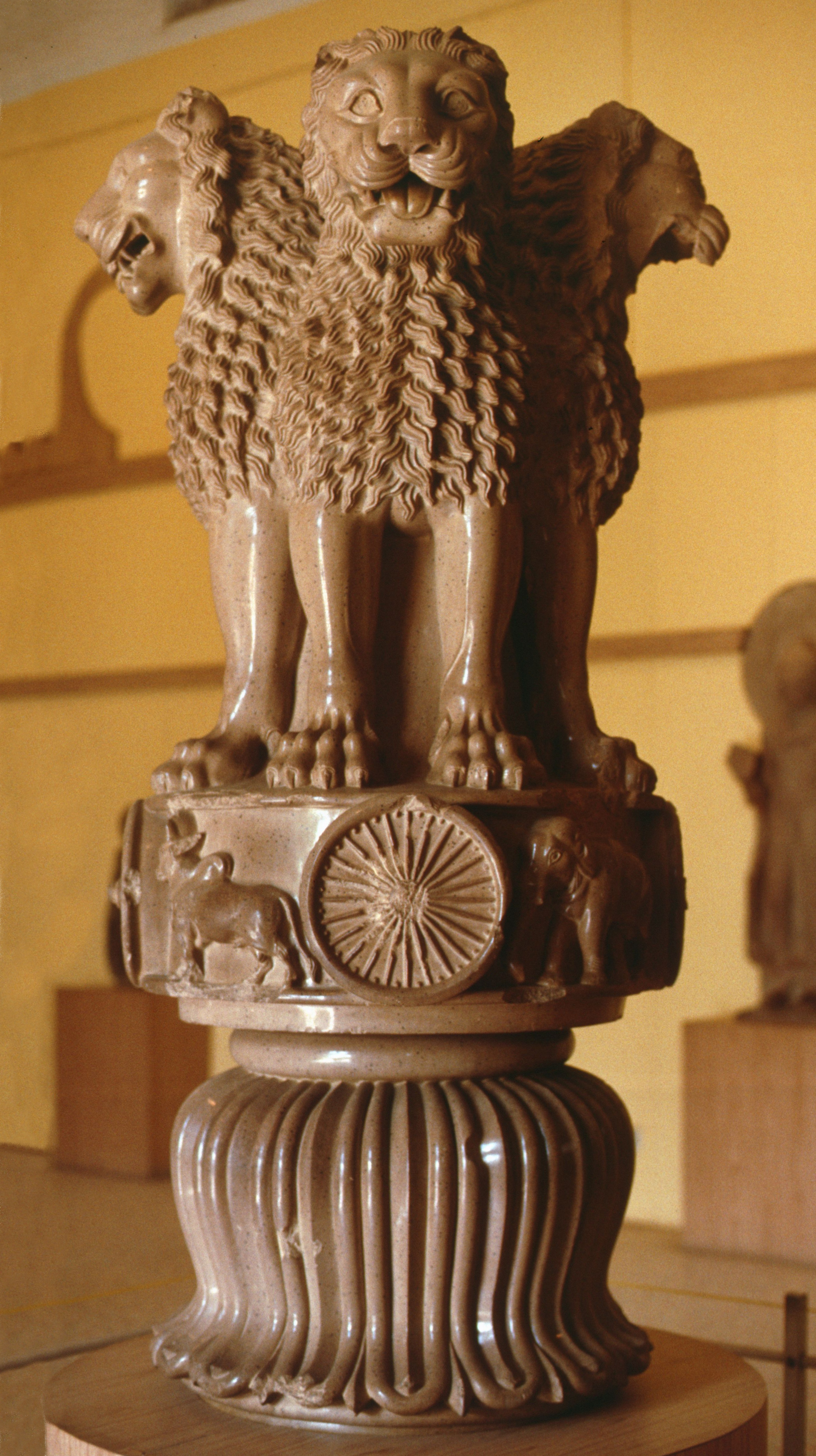
- Lion Capital in Sanchi, made by Emperor Ashoka
- Country: Magadha Empire
- Current region: India; Pakistan; Bangladesh; Nepal; Afghanistan
- Founded: 322 BCE
- Founder: Chandragupta Maurya
- Final ruler: Brihadratha Maurya
- Seat: Pataliputra
- Titles: Emperor of Magadha; Emperor of the Four Continents (Chakravala Chakravartin)
- Deposition: 185 BCE, assassination of Emperor Brihadratha by his General Pushyamitra Shunga

=== List of monarchs ===
This dynasty ruled for a considerably longer period than the previous house and had nine rulers.

| Sr. No | Name | Dynasty | Start (BCE) | End (BCE) | Duration | Note |
|---|---|---|---|---|---|---|
| 55 | Chandragupta Maurya | Maurya dynasty | 321 | 297 | 24 | Chronological anchor — 321 BCE; founder of the Maurya Empire; overthrew Dhana Nanda with the counsel of Chanakya; defeated Seleucus I Nicator c. 305–303 BCE; corroborated by Megasthenes' Indica, the Arthashastra, and the Mudrarakshasa; abdicated in favour of his son and became a Jain monk according to tradition |
| 56 | Bindusara (Amitraghata / Bhadrasara) | Maurya dynasty | 297 | 272 | 25 | Son of Chandragupta; called Amitrochates ("Slayer of Enemies") by Greek sources; extended the empire southward into the Deccan; maintained diplomatic correspondence with Seleucid and Ptolemaic courts; received Greek ambassadors Deimakos and Dionysius |
| 57 | Ashoka (Devanampiya Piyadasi) | Maurya dynasty | 272 | 236 | 36 | Greatest ruler of the dynasty; conquered Kalinga (c. 261 BCE) and renounced military expansion thereafter; propagated Dhamma throughout his empire; issued the Edicts of Ashoka — the only contemporaneous epigraphic source for the Mauryan period; dispatched Buddhist missions to Hellenistic kingdoms; known in his own inscriptions exclusively as Devanampiya Piyadasi |
| 58 | Kunala (Suyashas) | Maurya dynasty | 236 | 228 | 8 | Son of Ashoka; the Vishnu Purana names him Suyashas, identified by scholars with Kunala; according to the Divyavadana and Ashokavadana, he was blinded at the instigation of a jealous stepmother |
| 59 | Dasharatha Maurya | Maurya dynasty | 228 | 220 | 8 | Grandson of Ashoka; dedicated the Nagarjuni Hill caves to the Ajivikas; his cave inscriptions use the title Devanampiya, identical to Ashoka's; the empire appears to have divided between Dasharatha (east, Pataliputra) and Samprati (west, Ujjain) following Ashoka's death |
| 60 | Samprati | Maurya dynasty | 220 | 211 | 9 | Son of Kunala (per Buddhist and Jain sources) or son of Dasharatha (per Puranas); devout Jain whose patronage of Jainism is described in Hemachandra's Parishishtaparvan; credited with building thousands of Jain temples across the subcontinent |
| 61 | Shalishuka (Salisuka) | Maurya dynasty | 211 | 198 | 13 | Described in the Garga Samhita as quarrelsome, cunning, irreligious and oppressive; his reign marked the onset of serious imperial fragmentation; the Yuga Purana records that Indo-Greek (Yavana) forces began pressing on the empire's northwestern frontiers during this period |
| 62 | Devavarman | Maurya dynasty | 198 | 191 | 7 | Named in both Vishnu and Vayu Puranas; continued decentralization of imperial authority |
| 63 | Shatadhanvan (Shatadhanush) | Maurya dynasty | 191 | 183 | 8 | Named consistently in all Puranic recensions; the Vayu Purana variant gives the name as Shatadhanush |
| 64 | Brihadratha Maurya | Maurya dynasty | 183 | 185 | 3 | Last emperor of the Maurya Empire; the Harshacharita of Banabhatta (7th century CE) describes how his general Pushyamitra Shunga murdered him during a military review parade in 185 BCE; with his death the Maurya imperial line ended |

== House of Shunga ==
The Shunga dynasty was the seventh ruling house of Magadha. Pushyamitra Shunga, the Commander-in-Chief of Emperor Brihadratha Maurya, organized a coup d'état and killed the emperor, usurping the throne in 184 BCE. This dynasty lasted for 112 years, ruling Magadha from 184 to 72 BCE.

House of Shunga 𑀰𑀼𑀁𑀕
- Imperial house of Magadha
- Country: Magadha Empire
- Current region: India; Pakistan; Bangladesh
- Founded: c. 185 BCE
- Founder: Pushyamitra
- Final ruler: Devabhuti
- Seat: Patliputra and Vidisha
- Titles: Emperor of Magadha
- Deposition: 72 BCE

=== List of monarchs ===
This dynasty had nine monarchs.

| Sr. No | Name | Dynasty | Start (BCE) | End (BCE) | Duration | Note |
|---|---|---|---|---|---|---|
| 65 | Pushyamitra Shunga | Shunga dynasty | 185 | 149 | 36 | Founder of the Shunga dynasty; Brahmin commander-in-chief (senapati) of the Mauryan army who murdered Brihadratha Maurya in front of his own forces; performed two Ashvamedha (horse sacrifice) ceremonies to legitimize his rule as recorded in the Ayodhya inscription of Dhanadeva; successfully repelled Indo-Greek invasions; his reign and exploits are central to Kalidasa's play Malavikagnimitra |
| 66 | Agnimitra | Shunga dynasty | 149 | 141 | 8 | Son of Pushyamitra; served as viceroy of Vidisha during his father's reign; the central protagonist of Kalidasa's play Malavikagnimitra |
| 67 | Vasujyeshtha | Shunga dynasty | 141 | 134 | 7 | Named Sujyeshtha in the Vishnu Purana; son of Agnimitra |
| 68 | Vasumitra | Shunga dynasty | 134 | 124 | 10 | Grandson of Pushyamitra; defeated an Indo-Greek cavalry squadron on the banks of the Sindhu river while serving as guardian of the horse in his grandfather's Ashvamedha sacrifice; this event is attested in the Malavikagnimitra |
| 69 | Bhagabhadra | Shunga dynasty | 124 | 122 | 2 | Named Ardraka in the Vishnu Purana and Andhraka in some recensions; brief and historically obscure reign |
| 70 | Pulindaka | Shunga dynasty | 122 | 119 | 3 | |
| 71 | Ghosha (Ghoshavasu) | Shunga dynasty | 119 | 116 | 3 | Named Ghoshavasu in the Vishnu Purana |
| 72 | Vajramitra | Shunga dynasty | 116 | 107 | 9 | |
| 73 | Bhagavata (Bhagabhadra) | Shunga dynasty | 107 | 75 | 32 | The Heliodorus pillar at Vidisha, dated c. 110 BCE, records that the Greek ambassador Heliodorus — dispatched by the Indo-Greek king Antialcidas from Taxila — visited the court of "Bhagabhadra", identified with this king; Heliodorus describes himself as a devotee of Vasudeva (Vishnu), providing one of the earliest records of a Greek convert to Vaishnavism |
| 74 | Devabhuti (Devabhumi) | Shunga dynasty | 75 | 73 | 10 | Last king of the Shunga dynasty; the Harshacharita of Banabhatta describes him as dissolute; murdered by his Brahmin minister Vasudeva Kanva, who then founded the Kanva dynasty |

== House of Kanva ==
The Kanva dynasty was the eighth and last ruling house of Magadha. This dynasty was founded by Vasudeva Kanva who overthrow the Emperor Devabhuti in 73 BCE. This dynasty lasted for only 45 years, ruling Magadha from 73 to 28 BCE. On 28 BCE, the last emperor, Susarman Kanva was killed by the Satavahana Emperor Satakarni II and the Magadha Empire subsequently collapsed.

House of Kanva 𑀓𑀁𑀯
- Imperial house of Magadha
- Country: Magadha Empire
- Current region: India; Bangladesh
- Founded: 73 BCE
- Founder: Vasudeva Kanva
- Final ruler: Susarman Kanva
- Seat: Pataliputra and Vidisha
- Titles: Emperor of Magadha
- Deposition: 28 BCE, invaded by Satavahana Empire

=== List of monarchs ===
There were 4 monarchs in this dynasty.

| Sr. No | Name | Dynasty | Start (BCE) | End (BCE) | Duration | Note |
|---|---|---|---|---|---|---|
| 75 | Vasudeva Kanva | Kanva dynasty | 73 | 64 | 9 | Founder of the dynasty; Brahmin minister (amatya) of the last Shunga king Devabhuti, whom he murdered; the dynasty name derives from his gotra (Kanva), descended from the Vedic sage Kanva; the Puranas describe the Kanvas as Sungabhrityas ("servants of the Shungas") |
| 76 | Bhumimitra | Kanva dynasty | 64 | 50 | 14 | Son of Vasudeva Kanva; the longest-reigning Kanva king; copper coins bearing the legend Bhumimitra and Kanvasya have been recovered from Panchala, Vidisha, and Kaushambi, providing numismatic corroboration of his reign |
| 77 | Narayana | Kanva dynasty | 50 | 38 | 12 | Son of Bhumimitra; named consistently in Vishnu, Matsya, and Vayu Puranas; no independent epigraphic or numismatic record beyond the Puranic succession list |
| 78 | Susharman (Susarman / Susarmaka) | Kanva dynasty | 38 | 28 | 10 | Last king of the Kanva dynasty and the final king of the unbroken line of Magadha; killed by Simuka, founder of the Satavahana dynasty, c. 28 BCE; the Vishnu Purana states explicitly: In succession to them, the earth will pass to the Andhras; with Susharman's death, Magadha's extensive role as the political centre of northern India came to an end |

== See also ==
- Magadha
- Greater Magadha
- Magadha period
- Magadhi Prakrit
- List of Indian monarchs
