= Brihadratha =

Founder of the first ruling dynasty of the Magadha Empire

Brihadratha बृहद्रथ
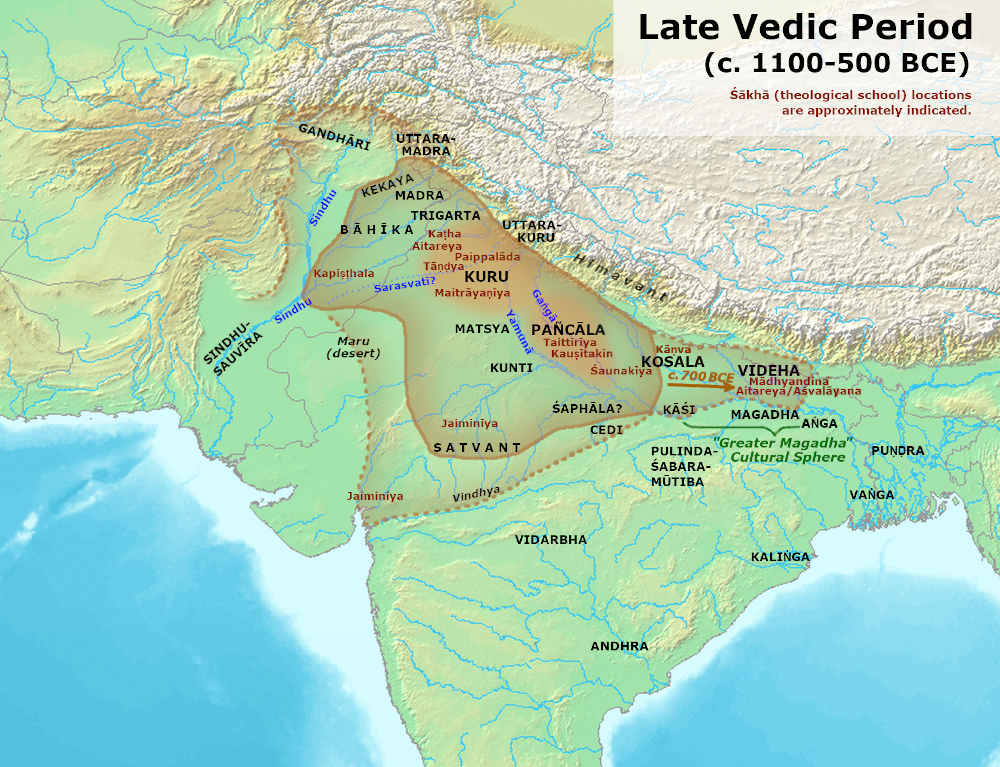
- Late Vedic culture extent

King of Magadha
- Reign: 1700 – 1680 BCE (legendary)
- Predecessor: Position established
- Successor: Jarasandha
- Issue: Jarasandha, Shashirekha
- Dynasty: Brihadratha dynasty
- Father: Uparichara Vasu
- Mother: Girika

Brihadratha I (Sanskrit: बृहद्रथ, romanized: Bṛhadratha) was the founder of the legendary Brihadratha dynasty, the earliest ruling dynasty of Magadha featured in Hindu literature. He established Magadha on the banks of the river Ganges, transferring the centre of power from Chedi, a neighbouring kingdom, to the newly settled Magadha. During his reign and that of his son Jarasandha, Magadha became a major power of the land. He had a daughter named Shashirekha who was the second wife of Dhrishtadyumna.

Brihadratha was the eldest of the five sons of Vasu, (also known as Uparichara Vasu) the Kuru king of Chedi and his queen Girika. His father was the ruler of Chedi and Brihadratha established Magadha at the border of Chedi Kingdom. He is mentioned in the epic Mahabharata and the Puranas. The name of Brihadratha is also found in the Rigveda (I.36.18, X.49.6).

== Etymology ==
The name is a combination of bṛhat meaning 'great' or 'huge', and ratha meaning 'chariot'. Therefore, the name Brihadratha (Sanskrit: बृहद्रथ; IAST: Bṛhadratha) can be assumed to be meaning "someone with a great/huge chariot".

== Literature ==
Brihadratha established his dynasty in Magadha. Ripunjaya was the last in his lineage, who was killed by his minister in 682 BCE.

All the Puranas mention his sister Amna, as his successor. Kushagra was succeeded by his son Vrishava (or Rishava). Pushpavanta (or Pushyavanta or Punyavanta) was the son of Vrishava. Pushpavanta was succeeded by his son Satyahita (or Satyadhrita). Satyahita's son was Sudhanvana (or Sudharmana, Dharmatma, or Dhanusha). Dhanusha was succeeded by his son Sarva (or Urja or Jatu or Jahu or Jantu). Sarva was succeeded by his son Sambhava. According to the Agni Purana, Sambhava was succeeded by his son Jarasandha, the noted warrior king mentioned in the Mahabharata. However, all other Puranic genealogical lists mention the name of Brihadratha again between either Jantu and Jarasandha or Sambhava and Jarasandha. Jarasandha was succeeded by his son Sahadeva who was killed in the Kurukshetra War.

== See also ==
- Pradyota dynasty
- Brihadratha dynasty
