= Shrutayudha =

Shrutayudha/Shrutayu

Information
- Nickname: Shrutayu
- Weapon: Gada
- Family: Varuna and Parnasa (parents)
- Spouse: Sakrayani
- Children: Sakradeva

Śrutāyudha (Devanagari: श्रुतायुध) is a king of Kalinga mentioned in the Hindu epic Mahabharata. He is the son of Varuna and the river goddess Parnasa.

== Magical Mace ==
Srutayudha's mother had wished for a boon from Varuna for his son so that he could not be slayed by anyone in battle. Since he cannot grant immortality, Varuna instead presents a magical mace to Srutayudha by using which he would stay undefeated in battle.

Varuna had also warned about the adverse effects of this weapon if it was used against an unarmed opponent. According to the warning, the Mace would strike back Srutyudha himself if he used it against any unarmed person.

== Kurukshetra War ==
Kalinga is mentioned as siding with Hastinapura and the Kauravas in the Kurukshetra War, presumably siding with the Kauravas. Srutayudha is mentioned in Drona Parva as a tiger among men.

On the first day of the war, he confronts Iravan, giving a good fight, but is ultimately defeated.

== The Mace Used in the Battle by Srutayudha ==
On the 14th day of battle, the Kamboja army division is being assailed by Arjuna as the latter is attempting to reach the end of Drona's Padmavyuha. Rescuing Kritavarma, Srutayudha, from atop his elephant, challenges Arjuna, striking Arjuna with multiple arrows. However, Arjuna counters, snapping Srutayudha's bow. Filled with wrath at Krishna as Srutayudha was Jarasandha ally, Srutayudha hurls his mace at Krishna who received that mace. As per the conditions described by Varuna, the mace boomerangs back on Srutayudha killing him.
