= Pandya kingdom (Mahabharata) =

Mythical kingdom in the Mahabharata

The Pandyas were fierce warriors who took part in the Kurukshetra War as per the epic Mahabharata. A Pandya king named Darshak, is mentioned as participating in the Kurukshetra War, siding with the Pandavas.

== References in Mahabharata ==
=== Places in Pandya kingdom ===
All the references (n:m) found in this article refer to Mahabharata, nth book, mth chapter The mountain Rishabha in Pandya kingdom is mentioned at (Mahabharata 3:85). In the country of the Pandyas are the tirthas (holy spots) named Agastya and Varuna! There, amongst the Pandyas, is the tirtha called the Kumaris (Kanyakumari) (3:88). Thamiraparani and Gokarna are also mentioned in the same passage.

=== Other Military expeditions to South ===
Bhishmaka, the mighty king of the Bhojas (of Vidarbha kingdom) who governs a fourth part of the world, by his learning conquered the Pandyas and the Kratha-Kausikas (2:14).

Having met with Rukmi (of Vidarbha kingdom), Karna, repaired to Pandya and the mountain, Sri. By fighting, he made Kerala kingdom, king Nila, Venudari’s son, and other best of kings living in the southern direction pay tribute (3:252).

=== Tribute to Yudhishthira during Rajasuya ===
Pandya was present in the Rajasuya ceremony of Pandava king Yudhishthira (2:36,43). The Kings of Chera and Pandya, brought numberless jars of gold filled with fragrant sandal juice from the hills of Malaya, and loads of sandal and aloe wood from the Dardduras hills, and many gems of great brilliancy and fine cloths inlaid with gold. Singhalas gave those best of sea-born gems called the lapis lazuli, and heaps of pearls also, and hundreds of coverlets for elephants (2:51).

=== Pandyas in Kurukshetra War ===
Pandya king Sarangadhwaja sided with the Pandavas in the great Kurukshetra War. His main opponent was Ashwathama.

As per Bhishma's ratings, Pandya king was rated as a great Ratha (a grade for chariot-warriors) (5,172).

Pandya, who dwelt on the coast-land near the sea, came accompanied by troops of various kinds to Yudhishthira, the king of kings (5:19). There hath come Pandya. Remarkably heroic and endued with prowess and energy that have no parallel, he is devoted to the Pandava cause. (5:22).

Dhrishtadyumna and Shikhandi and the five sons of Draupadi and the Prabhadrakas, and Satyaki and Chekitana with the Dravida forces, and the Pandyas, the Cholas, and the Cheras, surrounded by a mighty array – were mentioned as part of the Pandava army (8:12).

Pandya, that foremost of warriors skilled in shafts and weapons, was destroying crowds of foes by means of diverse kinds of shafts. Piercing the bodies of the elephants and steeds and men with sharp shafts, that foremost of smiters overthrew and deprived them of life. Cutting off with his own shafts the diverse weapons hurled at him by many foremost of foes, Pandya slew his enemies (8:19). He was slain by the Kaurava hero Ashwatthama (8:20,46) His name was mentioned as Sarangadhwaja.

There is a doubt if some other Pandya king sided with the Kauravas as indicated by the following passage at (9:2):- When the mighty Pandya, that foremost of all wielders of weapons, has been slain in battle by the Pandavas, what can it be but destiny?

=== Other References ===
Pandya king took part in the self-choice event of Panchala princess Draupadi (MBh 1:189) along with the rulers of Kalinga, Vanga and others.

== See also ==
- Mahajanapadas
