= Jayatsena =

King in the Mahabharata

- Mahabharata character
- Gender: Male
- Title: Māgadhānām adhipatiḥ (lord of the Magadhas)
- Family: Jarasandha (father); Sahadeva (brother) multiple other siblings
- Home: Magadha
- Dynasty: Brihadratha

Jayatsena is a character in the ancient Hindu epic the Mahabharata, mentioned as a king of Magadha. He is the brother of King Sahadeva, the son of Jarasandha who was installed on the throne of Magadha by the Pandavas following the death of their father. Jayatsena is famous for bringing an akshauhini to support the Pandavas before the Kurukshetra War, although there is ambiguity regarding his actual alliance during the war itself.

While some verses suggest that he supported the Pandavas, the Mahabharata also describes that Jayatsena—'the king of Magadha' and 'son of Jarasandha'—fought on the side of the Kauravas and was slain by the Pandava warrior Abhimanyu. Due to this inconsistency, scholars have proposed two interpretations: either there were two Magadhan princes named Jayatsena aligned with opposing sides, or the text contains a transmission or attribution error.

== Etymology ==
The name Jayatsena (Sanskrit: जयत्सेन) is a compound of jayat (from jaya, meaning “victory” or “conquest”) and sena (meaning “army”). Thus, Jayatsena can be translated as 'he of the victorious army' or 'one who possesses a victorious army'.

Other than the Magadhan king, the name occurs in other several contexts In Sanskrit literature:

- As the name of a son of Sarvabhauma (Mahabharata I.3769), and of Nadina (Harivamsa 1516; Vishnu Purana IV.9.8; Vayu Purana).
- As a pseudonym assumed by a Pandava prince Nakula while in disguise at the court of King Virata (Mahabharata IV.176)
- As the name of one of Kaurava brothers, who fought Shanatika (Mahabharata VI.69).

== Identity and Lineage ==
According to the Adi Parva (I.67.2684), Jayatsena is described as the incarnation of the eldest of the Kālakeya demons. He was a Magadhan royal and the younger brother of King Sahadeva, the son of the powerful Jarasandha of Magadha. After the Pandava Bhima, assisted by Krishna and Arjuna, killed Jarasandha, Sahadeva was installed as king by them. The kingdom subsequently became divided in its loyalties, as various rulers emerged in its western and eastern territories. Jayatsena is mentioned as having possessed some sovereignty in the region alongside his brother Sahadeva.

Jayatsena is first seen in the epic as present at the svayamvara of Draupadi (I.186.6988), where he is listed along with Sahadeva of Magadha as a distinguished guest.

== Association with the Pandavas ==
Jayatsena's loyalty to the Pandavas is clearly established in the Sabha Parva (II.44.1538), which mentions him as the ruler of Magadha. During the preparations for war, the Sainyodyoga Parva provides multiple attestations of his allegiance. In Udyoga Parva (V.4.71–82 and again in V.19.577), Jayatsena is recorded as having brought a full akshauhini—a massive contingent of forces comprising 21,870 chariots, 21,870 elephants, 65,610 cavalry, and 109,350 infantry—to support Yudhishthira. This alliance is reaffirmed in V.50.2014, where the verse explicitly states, "Jarāsandha's son Jayatsena and Sahadeva—both sided with Yudhiṣṭhira".

He is also mentioned in the battle narrative of the Drona Parva as fighting Kaurava princes.

== Association with the Kauravas ==
While the Udyoga Parva explicitly mentions that Jayatsena had sided with the Pandavas—along with Sahadeva of Magadha—several other references across the war books of the Mahabharata seem to indicate a contradictory tradition regarding his allegiance. In multiple war parvans, a Magadhan king named Jayatsena, also identified as the son of Jarasandha, is repeatedly mentioned as a prominent ally of the Kauravas.

This Jayatsena appears in the Bhishma Parva (VI.16.623) as a regional king who brought one akṣauhiṇi of troops to Duryodhana's army. He is referred to as Māgadhaḥ in Bhishma Parva (VI.108.5007), where he is described fighting Bhimasena. In the Karna Parva (VIII.5.120), he is explicitly called Jārāsandhiḥ...Māgadhaḥ and is said to have been slain by Abhimanyu—an event corroborated in VIII.73.3657, which states that the Māgadhānām adhipatiḥ (lord of the Magadhas) had been killed by Abhimanyu seven days earlier. His death is again lamented in the Stri Parva (XI.25.712), where the Maghadan women mourn the slain ruler of the Magadhas.

== Scholarly interpretations ==
The Mahabharata does not explicitly clarify whether these refer to one individual or two distinct figures. This ambiguity has led to contrasting scholarly perspectives.

F. E. Pargiter, in his historical analysis, does not accept the alliance of Jayatsena with the Pandavas. He contends that after Jarasandha's fall, Magadha was politically fragmented. Sahadeva, though placed on the throne by the Paṇḍavas, controlled only the western part of the kingdom. The eastern region, including the capital Girivraja, remained under separate rulers—Danda, Dandadhara, and a Jayatsena (or Jayasena)—who supported the Kauravas. Pargiter also mentions another Magadha prince named Jalasandha, who took the same side. He notes that Jayatsena was killed by Abhimanyu, further indicating his position as a Kaurava ally. While acknowledging that some verses (such as V.577 and V.2014) name Jayatsena among the Pandava forces, Pargiter treats these as textual errors or misattributions, where the name has been used mistakenly for Sahadeva. For him, the key issue is the political division within Magadha rather than the presence of two individuals with the same name.

In contrast, Vettam Mani, in his Purāṇic Encyclopaedia, recognises the existence of two kings named Jayatsena, both referred to as sons of Jarasandha. However, he affirms that the Jayatsena who fought on the side of the Pandavas was the son of the famous Jarasandha who had been slain by Bhima. After Jarasandha's death, the Paṇḍavas installed his son Sahadeva as the ruler of Magadha, and Mani identifies Jayatsena as Sahadeva's brother. To reconcile the conflicting references to Jayatsena's allegiances, Mani suggests that the Jayatsena who supported the Kauravas must have been the son of another Magadhan warrior named Jarasandha, thus proposing a distinction between two individuals with the same name.

James L. Fitzegarld, translator of the critical edition, lists Jayatsena as an important ally of the Pandavas.

Kevin McGrath interprets this ambiguity as part of a broader editorial phenomenon in the Mahabharata, where the epic's poets and editors may have been drawing on multiple narrative traditions, each with differing accounts of Magadha's allegiance. The lack of narrative consistency may not have been viewed as problematic by the compilers, who prioritised thematic richness and poetic inclusion over strict coherence. McGrath also theorises that the shifting portrayal of Magadha could also suggest regional or sectarian interpolations, with different recensions preserving varying versions of the same characters.
