= Ripunjaya =

Brihadratha emperor from 732 to 682 BCE

Emperor of Magadha
- Reign: 732–682 BCE (50 years)
- Predecessor: Viswajit
- Successor: Bimbisara
- Died: 682 BCE
- House: Brihadratha
- Religion: Hinduism

Ripunjaya was the last Puranic Brihadratha king of Magadha. His minister killed him, following which a gap of approximately 138 years (682–544 BCE) exists between the last Brihadratha king and Bimbisara; Indian texts are silent on this period. The Pradyota dynasty is deliberately excluded; it was based in Avanti (Ujjayini), not Magadha, and ruled concurrently as a parallel dynasty.

Thereafter, the throne went to Bimbisara of the Haryanka clan.

== See also ==
- Brihadratha
- Magadha
- Pradyota
- Pradyota dynasty
