= Brihadratha dynasty =

First dynasty that ruled Magadha

- 1700 BCE–682 BCE
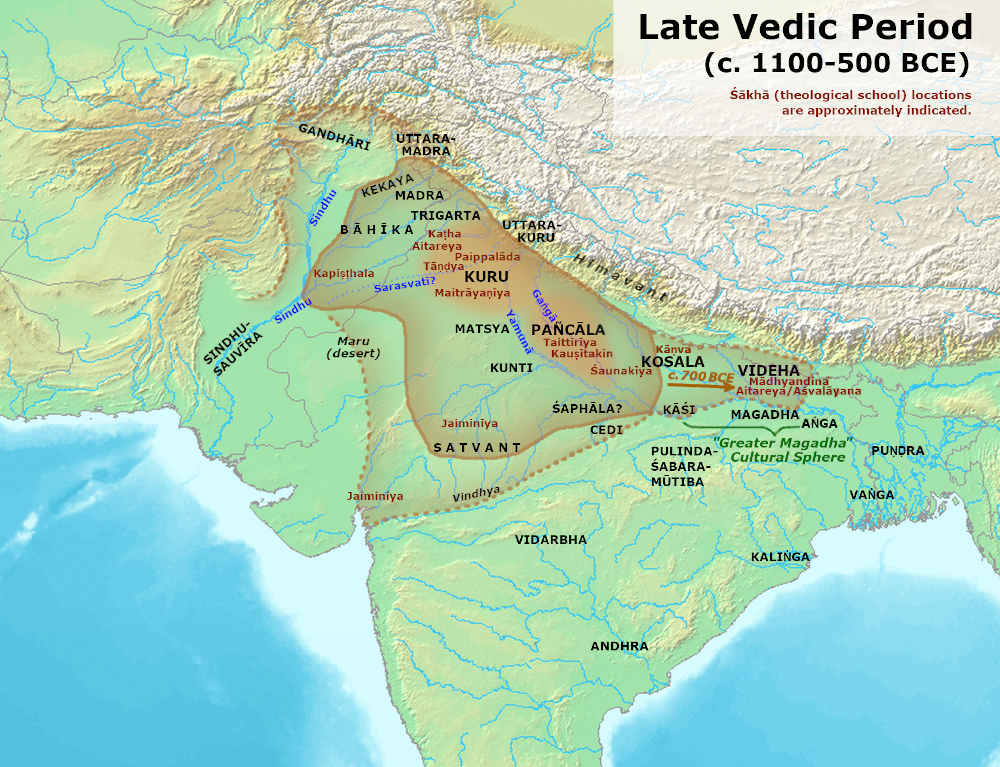
- Magadha in 1100 BCE ruled by the Brihadratha dynasty, in the north-eastern region
- Capital: Girivraja
- Common languages: Vedic Sanskrit
- Religion: Vedic Hinduism
- Government: Monarchy
- King
  - 1700–1680 BCE: Brihadratha (first ruler)
  - 1680–1665 BCE: Jarasandha
  - 732–682 BCE: Ripunjaya (last ruler)
- History
  - Established: 1700 BCE
  - Assassination of Ripunjaya: 682 BCE
| Preceded by | Succeeded by |
| Copper Hoard culture; Kikata kingdom | Pradyota dynasty; Haryanka dynasty |
- Today part of: India

The Brihadratha dynasty (Sanskrit: बृहद्रथ; IAST: Bṛhadratha) was the legendary first dynasty of the Magadha, according to the Puranas, and was founded by Brihadratha. The capital of Magadha under Jarasandha is mentioned in Mahabharata as Girivraja. Scholarship significantly identified Girivraja with Rajgir.

== History ==
=== Brihadratha ===
According to the Puranas, Brihadratha (also Maharatha) was the king of Magadha and the founder of the Brihadratha dynasty. According to the Mahabharata and the Purana, he was the eldest of the five sons of Uparichara Vasu, the Kuru king of Chedi, and his queen was Girika. The name 'Brihadratha' is found twice in the Rigveda (I.36.18, X.49.6); however, it is not indicated whether this refers to the father of Jarasandha.

=== Jarasandha ===
The Mahabharatha mentions that Jarasandha was the son of Brihadratha and the greatest ruler of the dynasty. According to Jai Samhita, 24 Brihadratha kings ruled for many years. The name of Jarasandha appears in the Puranas many times. Jarasandha was inimical to the Yadava and is mentioned as a villain in the Mahabharata.

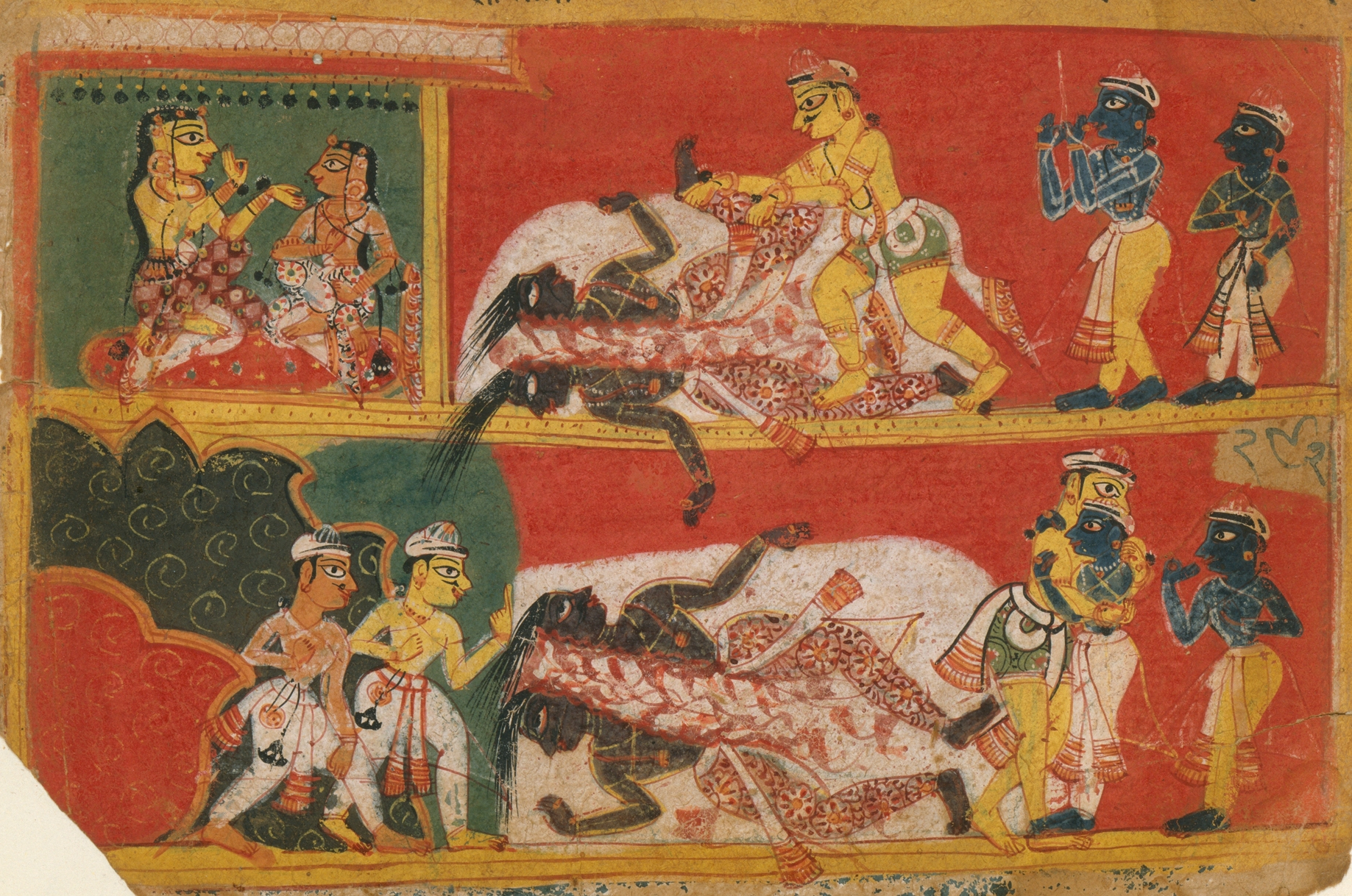
Bhima slays Jarasandha in a wrestling fight.

As per the epic, Bhima with the help of Krishna killed Jarasandha. The site is mentioned as Girivraja in Mahabharata, and scholars have identified the place with modern Rajgir. Girivraja is also significantly noted in Mahabharata as the capital of Jarasandha.

=== Sahadeva ===
According to scripture, Sahadeva was the son of Jarasandha placed on the throne of Magadha by the Pandava after the assassination of Jarasandha. Sahadeva has fought the Kurukshetra War on the side of the Pandavas. According to the Puranas, he was killed in the Kurukshetra War by Shakuni, along with his cousin Jayadeva. He was succeeded by Somadhi.

=== Later rulers ===
Somadhi (or Somphi) was the son of Sahadeva and was placed on the throne of Magadha by the Pandavas after he agreed to be their subordinate.

== End of dynasty ==
The last of the Brihadratha dynasty was Ripunjaya, who was killed by a minister named Punika (Pulika) according to the Puranas. After the death of Ripunjaya, Punika placed his son Pradyota on the throne and founded the Pradyota dynasty in 682 BCE.

== List of rulers ==
List of Brihadratha dynasty rulers according to the Vayu Purana
| Ruler | Reign (BCE) | Length of Reign (estd.) |
|---|---|---|
| Brihadratha | 1700–1680 BCE | 20 |
| Jarasandha | 1680–1665 BCE | 15 |
| Sahadeva | 1665–1661 BCE | 4 |
| Somadhi | 1661–1603 BCE | 58 |
| Srutasravas | 1603–1539 BCE | 64 |
| Ayutayus | 1539–1503 BCE | 36 |
| Niramitra | 1503–1463 BCE | 40 |
| Sukshatra | 1463–1405 BCE | 58 |
| Brihatkarman | 1405–1382 BCE | 23 |
| Senajit | 1382–1332 BCE | 50 |
| Srutanjaya | 1332–1292 BCE | 40 |
| Vipra | 1292–1257 BCE | 35 |
| Suchi | 1257–1199 BCE | 60 |
| Kshemya | 1199–1171 BCE | 26 |
| Subrata | 1171–1107 BCE | 64 |
| Dharma | 1107–1043 BCE | 64 |
| Susuma | 1043–970 BCE | 73 |
| Dridhasena | 970–912 BCE | 58 |
| Sumati | 912–879 BCE | 33 |
| Subala | 879–857 BCE | 22 |
| Sunita | 857–817 BCE | 40 |
| Satyajit | 817–767 BCE | 50 |
| Viswajit | 767–732 BCE | 35 |
| Ripunjaya | 732–682 BCE | 50 |

== See also ==
- Pradyota dynasty

| Preceded by Copper Hoard Culture | Brihadratha dynasty 1700 BCE – 682 BCE | Succeeded by Pradyota dynasty |
