= Dhrishtaketu =

Character in the Mahabharata

- Mahabharata character
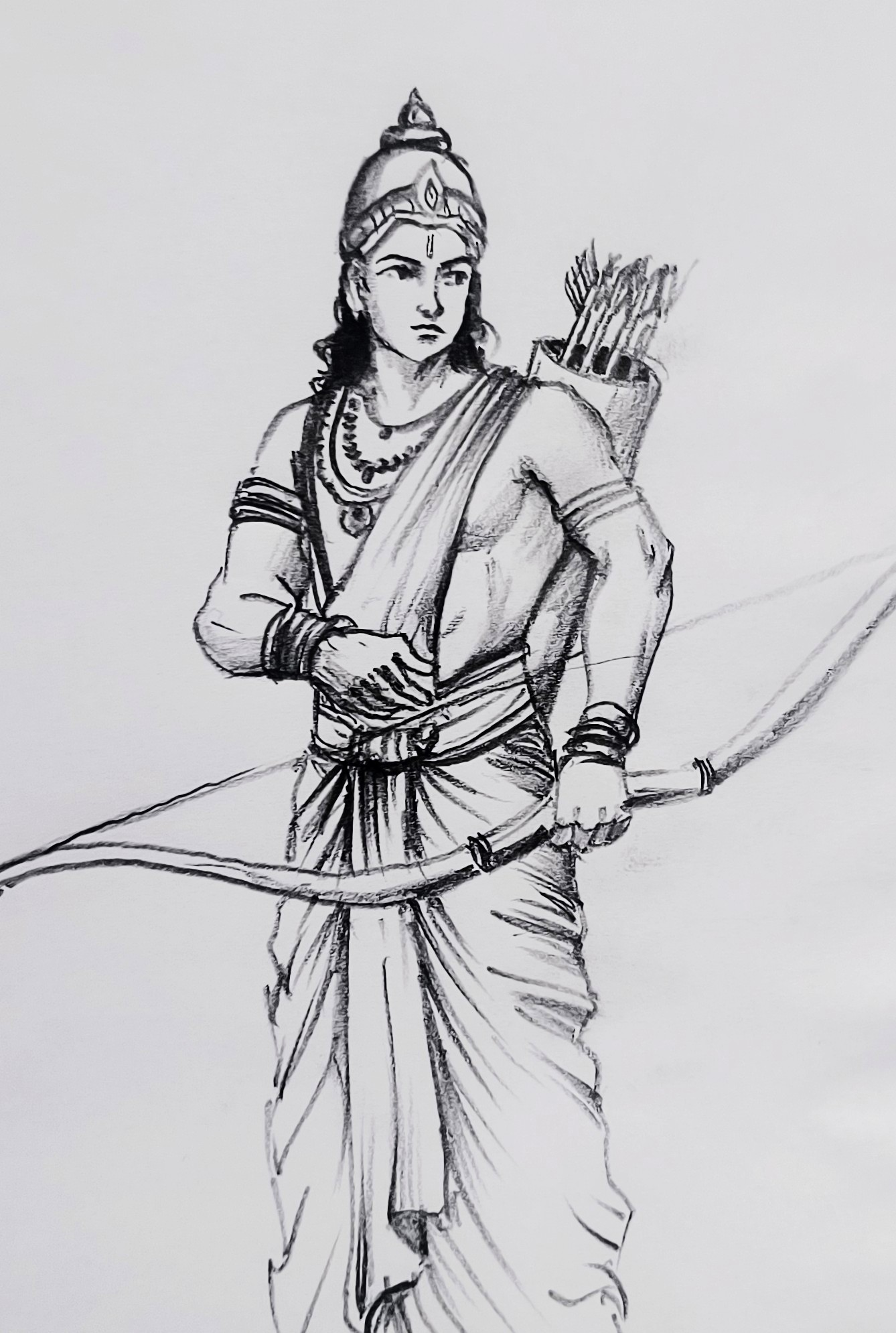
- An illustration of Dhrishtaketu
- Gender: Male
- Title: King of Chedi
- Affiliation: Pandavas
- Weapon: Bow and arrow
- Family: Shishupala (father); Sarabha, Mahipala and Suketu (brothers); Karenumati (sister)
- Children: Chekitana and other sons
- Origin: Chedi

Dhrishtaketu (Sanskrit: धृष्टकेतु, romanized: Dhṛṣṭaketu) is a character in the ancient Indian epic Mahabharata. He is a king of the Chedi kingdom and the eldest son of Shishupala. He is a loyal ally of the Pandavas, and plays a major role in the Kurukshetra War, where he served as one of the seven commanders of their army.

== Etymology and epithets ==
According to the Monier-Williams, the name Dhṛṣṭaketu (Sanskrit: धृष्टकेतु) is a compound word derived from the Sanskrit roots dhṛṣṭa (धृष्ट)—meaning "bold," "audacious," or "courageous—and ketu (केतु)—"flag," "banner," or "emblem". Dhrishtaketu shares this name with various other figures including a son of Dhrishtadyumna.

Throughout the Mahabharata, Vyasa refers to Dhrishtaketu by various epithets:

- Caidya (descendant of the Chedi dynasty)
- Cedija (born in the Chedi clan)
- Cedipati (lord of the Chedis)
- Cedipungava (distinguished among the Chedis)
- Cedirat (king of the Chedis)
- Shaishupali (son of Shishupala)
- Shishupalatmaja (son of Shishupala)

== Biography ==
According to the Adi Parva (Amshavatara Parva, Chapter 67, Stanza 7), Dhrishtaketu is considered to be a partial incarnation of Anuhlada, the son of the demon king Hiranyakashipu. Dhrishtaketu is born to Shishupala, who belongs to Dasharha clan descending from Yadu from his maternal side.

Dhrishtaketu is frequently mentioned in the Mahabharata across various Parvans, particularly in connection with the Pandavas. After the death of Shishupala at the Pandava Yudhishthira's Rajasuya, narrated in Sabhā Parva, Dhrishtaketu is installed as the king of Chedi and becomes a tributary king under the Pandavas. In the Vana Parva, He is described as visiting the Pandavas just before their forest exile. Afterwards, he is said to have returned to his capital, Shuktimati, taking with him his sister Karenumati, who had been married to Nakula, the fourth Pandava. (Note: Few scholars state her as his daughter.) Later, he makes a second visit to the Pandavas in the forest, reaffirming his allegiance.

According to the Udyoga Parva, Dhrishtaketu is among the kings to whom Yudhishthira sends messengers before the Kurukshetra War. He later arrives at the war council with a full akshauhini of troops (an akshauhini consisted of 21,870 elephants, 21,870 chariots, 65,610 horses, and 109,350 infantry). He is a great bowman and a Maharatha (a great chariot-warrior) as per the rating of Bhishma. One of his sons also takes part in the war. Dhrishtaketu is appointed one of the seven commanders-in-chief of Yudhishthira’s forces. During the war, Dhrishtaketu engages in combat with several formidable warriors, including with Bahlika on the first day of the battle. He is seen in various strategic positions, including the right horn of the ardhachandra-vyuha (crescent moon) formation and the army’s rear. He engages in combat with Bhurishravas and Paurava during these battles. In the Drona Parva, it is noted that Dhrishtaketu had remained with the Pandavas even after others from the Chedi clan had departed. He fights against Kripa (the teacher of the Kuru princes), accompanies King Virata, and challenges Drona, the commander-in-chief of the Kauravas, in battle. He also fights with Ambashtha. Dhrishtaketu also kills a warrior named Viradhanva during the war. However, his own life ends in battle when he fights against Drona and is slain by him.

In the Stri Parva, his death is mourned by the women of his household, including his wives, who grieve over his lifeless body. His cremation is also described in the Stri Parva. According to Ashramavasika Parva, after his death, Dhrishtaketu's spirit, along with those of other warriors who had perished in the war, was evoked by Vyasa to the surface of the Ganges. His spirit was among those who received posthumous rites. In the Svargarohana Parva, it is mentioned that Dhrishtaketu attained the status of a Vishvadeva in heaven after his death.
