= Shishupala =

Character in the Indian epic Mahabharata

- Mahabharata character
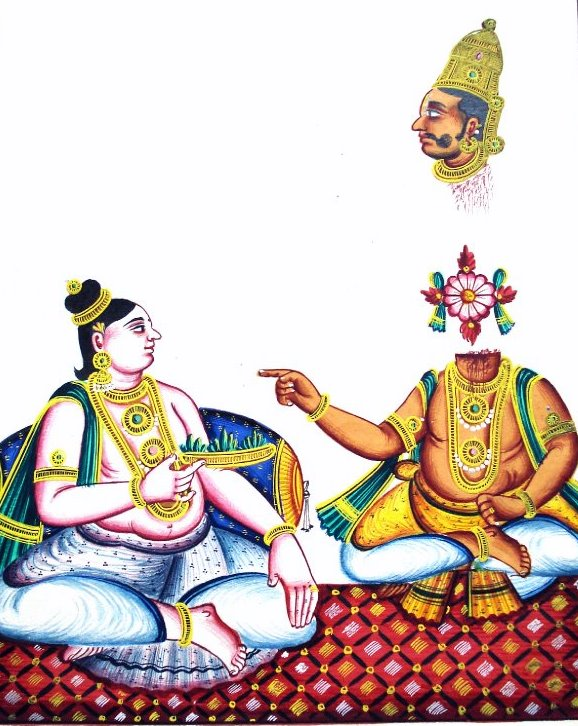
- Krishna slays Shishupala at the Rajasuya Yajña of Yudhishthira

Information
- Title: King of Chedi
- Family: Damaghosha (father); Srutashrava (mother); Dashagriva, Ramya, Bali, Kushadhysha (brothers); Suprabha (sister)
- Children: Dhrishtaketu, Mahipala, Suketu, Sarabha
- Relatives: Krishna (maternal cousin); Dantavakra (maternal cousin)
- Home: Chedi Kingdom

Shishupala (Sanskrit: शिशुपाल, lit. 'protector of children', IAST: Śiśupāla; sometimes spelt Sisupala) was the king of the Chedi kingdom, and an antagonist in the Mahabharata. He was the son of King Damaghosha and Srutashrava, the sister of Kunti, as well as the cousin of Nanda. He was slain by Krishna, his cousin and an avatar of Vishnu, at the great coronation ceremony of Yudhishthira, as a punishment for his opprobrious abuse made against him. He is also referred to as Chaidya ("King of Chedi"). Shishupala is considered to be the third and last birth of Vishnu's gatekeeper Jaya.

== Mahabharata ==
The Mahabharata states that Shishupala was born with three eyes and four arms. His parents were inclined to cast him out but were warned by a voice from heaven (ākāśavāṇī) not to do so, as his time had not come. It also foretold that his superfluous body parts would disappear when a certain person took the child into his lap, and that he would eventually die at the hands of that same person. Coming to visit his cousin, Krishna placed the child on his lap and the extra eye and arms disappeared, thus indicating Shishupala's death was destined at the hands of Krishna. In the Mahabharata, Shishupala's mother Shrutasrava persuaded her nephew, Krishna, that he would pardon his cousin Shishupala for a hundred offences.

Rukmi, the prince of Vidarbha, was very close to Shishupala. He wanted his sister Rukmini to marry Shishupala. But before the ceremony could take place, Rukmini chose to elope with Krishna. This exacerbated Shishupala's animosity towards Krishna.

When Yudhishthira undertook the Rajasuya Yajna, he sent Bhima to obtain the fealty of Shishupala, now king after his father's death. Shishupala accepted Yudhishthira's supremacy with no protest and was invited to the final ceremony at Indraprastha.

At that event, the Pandavas decided that Krishna would be the special honoured guest of the sacrificial ceremony. This angered Shishupala and he started insulting Krishna, calling him a mere cowherd and worthless to be honoured as a king. He also started insulting Bhishma, calling his vow to remain a celibate throughout life as an act of cowardice. Bhishma became furious and threatened Shishupala, but Krishna calmed him down. Through this act, he committed his 100th sin and was pardoned by Krishna. When he insulted Krishna again, he committed his 101st sin. Krishna then released his Sudarshana Chakra on Shishupala, killing him on the spot. Shishupala's soul was liberated and attained salvation by merging into Krishna's body.

The Shishupala Vadha is a work of classical Sanskrit poetry (kāvya) composed by Māgha in the 7th or 8th century. It is an epic poem consisting of 20 sargas (cantos) of about 1800 highly ornate stanzas and is considered one of the six Sanskrit mahakavyas, or "great epics". It is also known as the Māgha-kāvya after its author. Like other kavyas, it is admired more for its exquisite descriptions and lyrical quality than for any dramatic development of the plot. His sons were killed in the Kurukshetra War.

== See also ==
- Chedi Kingdom
