= Sahadeva of Magadha =

Sahadeva
- Mahabharata character

In-universe information
- Title: Magadha King
- Family: Jarasandha (father); Jayatsena (brother); Asti and Prapti (sisters)
- Children: Somadhi and Marjasp (sons)
- Origin: Brihadratha

Sahadeva (Sanskrit: सहदेव) was a prince and later a king mentioned in the Mahabharata and various Puranas. He was the son of the powerful Magadhan king Jarasandha and was installed on the throne following his father's death.

== Lineage and Succession ==
Sahadeva was the son of Jarasandha, the formidable king of Magadha. According to the Mahabharata, his sisters Asti and Prapti were married to Kamsa, the tyrannical ruler of Mathura. After Jarasandha was killed by Bhima, with the help of Arjuna and Krishna, Sahadeva was placed on the throne of Magadha by the Pandavas and Krishna. Sahadeva had a brother, Jayatsena (or Jayasena), who may have some sovereignty.

According to the Puranas, after being placed on the throne, he arranged for the ceremonial bath, dress, and meals of the kings who had been released from Jarasandha’s captivity at Krishna’s request. He later honoured Krishna when the latter departed from the capital.

Although Sahadeva was installed as king, he seemingly governed only the western portion of the Magadhan kingdom. The eastern region, with its capital at Girivraja, appears to have been controlled by two other rulers, Dandadhara and Danda. These kings are separately mentioned in the epic tradition and are not identified as sons of Jarasandha. They, along with another prince named Jalasandha, aligned themselves with the Kauravas during the Kurukshetra War, while Sahadeva supported the Pandavas. This suggests a political split within Magadha following Jarasandha’s fall.

According to the Puranas, Sahadeva had two sons: Somapi (also called Somadhi in some sources) and Marjasp. His dynasty continued through Somapi, who ruled at Girivraja for 58 years. Somapi’s son was Shrutashravas.

== Role in the Mahabharata ==
Sahadeva was present at the svayamvara of Draupadi and is recorded as one of the kings who showed allegiance to the Pandavas. He supported their cause in the Kurukshetra War, bringing one akshauhini of troops. He was designated one of the seven maharathis—great warriors—in the Pandava army. The Mahabharata states that he was slain by Drona during the war.
