= Jarasandha =

King in Hindu tradition

- Mahabharata character
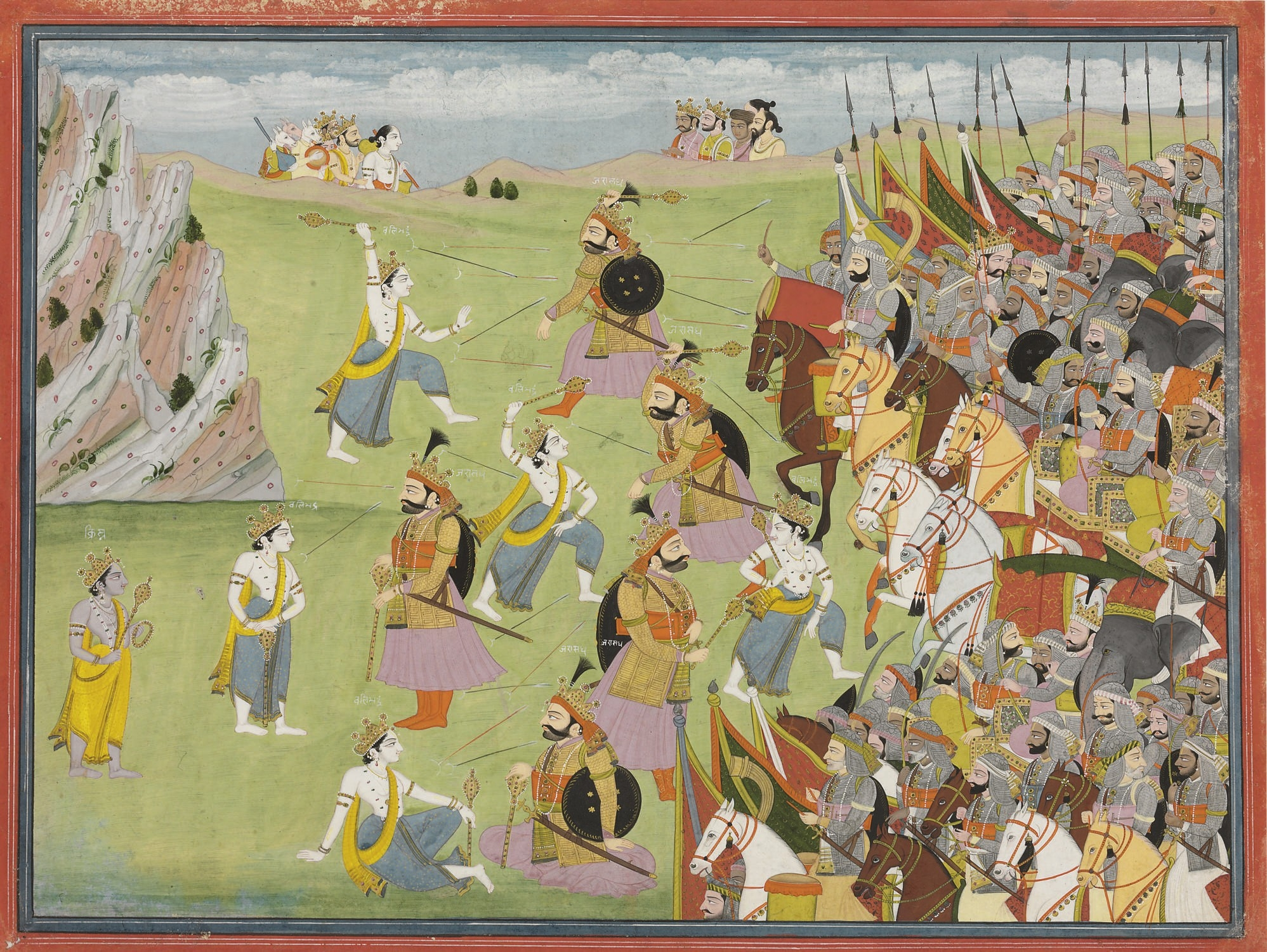
- Jarasandha fighting with Balarama, shown multiple times in the picture

Information
- Titles: King of Magadha
- Weapon: Gada
- Family: Brihadratha (father); Two princesses of Kashi (mothers)
- Children: Sahadeva of Magadha (son); Jayatsena (sons); Asti and Prapti (daughters, wives of Kamsa); Unnamed younger daughter (wife of Pandava prince Sahadeva)
- Home: Magadha Kingdom
- Predecessor: Brihadratha
- Successor: Sahadeva
- Dynasty: Brihadratha

Jarasandha (Sanskrit: जरासन्ध, romanized: Jarāsandha) is a legendary king featured in the Hindu texts. He is described as a powerful monarch of Magadha Kingdom, and a prominent enemy of the deity Krishna. He is also mentioned as the ninth pratinarayana in the Jain text Harivamsa Purana.

== Etymology ==
The word Jarasandha has been explained as a combination of two Sanskrit words: jara (जरा) and sandha (सन्ध), "joining". The meaning of Jarasandha is "the one who is joined by Jara".

== Legend ==
=== Birth and early life ===
Jarasandha's father, King Brihadratha, was married to the twin daughters of the king of Kashi. Brihadratha loved both his wives equally but had no sons. The sage Chandakaushika visited his kingdom and gave fruit to the king as a boon. The king divided the fruit equally between both of his wives. Soon, both wives became pregnant and gave birth to two halves of a human body. These two lifeless halves were very horrifying to view, so Brihadratha ordered to be thrown in the forest. An rakshasi named Jara found the two halves and picked up one with her right hand, one with her left, holding each piece in her palm. When she brought both of her palms together, the two pieces joined, becoming a living child. The child cried loudly, which caused Jara to panic. Not having the heart to eat a living child, Jara took the baby to the king and explained to him all that had happened. The father was overjoyed to see his son, and named the baby "Jarasandha" in honor of Jara the Asuri. He is considered to be an incarnation of the demon Viprachitti.

=== Conflicts with Balarama and Krishna ===
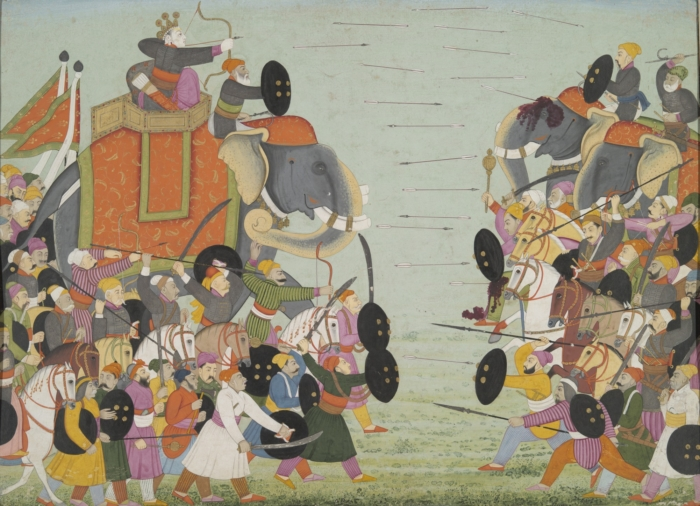
Battle between Balarama and Jarasandha. Illustration from a Bhagavata Purana series.

Kamsa, the ruler of Mathura, acquired Jarasandha's attention. Impressed with his bravery, Jarasandha made Kamsa his son-in-law by marrying off his two daughters. This makes Jarasandha a relative of Krishna. Krishna killed Kamsa as announced by a divine prophecy. Jarasandha got infuriated as his daughters were widowed. Thereafter, Jarasandha vowed revenge against Krishna. Jarasandha attacked Mathura with an army of 20 akshauhinis, but Krishna and Balarama defeated the whole army of Jarasandha and his allies with their troops.. Jarasandha attacked Mathura 17 times and was defeated by Krishna.

During the 18th attack, the Yavana king Kalayavana also attacked Mathura with a huge army. Kalyavana had a boon to never die on a battle field, so Krishna challenged him to a duel. While fighting, Krishna lures him into a mountain where the great king Muchukunda lay asleep. Muchukunda had left his kingdom to help the devas in a great war against the asuras, he stayed and protected Svargaloka for 1 year until the asuras were finally defeated. Indra tells Muchukunda to ask a boon as they can grant him anything but Muchukunda says that he doesn't want anything as helping them was his pleasure and that he just wants to return home, Indra sadly replies that though only 1 year has passed in Svarga 360 years have passed on earth and that all of his family had died. Muchukunda was saddened and asked him for eternal sleep, so Indra grants him the boon that anybody who disturbs his sleep would turn to ashes. Krishna knew that Muchukunda was sleeping on the mountain but Kalayavana didn't, so when Krishna finds Muchukunda he covers him with a shawl that Krishna was wearing. Kalayavana upon seeing a sleeping man covered with Krishna's shawl thought that Krishna was pretending to sleep in order to escape him, as it's against the rules of war to attack a sleeping man. Kalayavana kicks him to make him stand up which wakes up Muchukunda and from his eyes great flames erupt causing Kalayavana to burn up and as he was not on the battlefield he died without violating his boon. Krishna then grants Muchukunda moksha, or freedom from the cycle of death and rebirth.

Jarasandha keeps attacking Mathura and eventually Krishna orders Vishvakarma, the divine architect, to craft a magnificent city near the sea which is done overnight, then Krishna transports the entire population of Mathura to the new city, which was named Dvaraka. When Jarasandha attacks again he sets the city of Mathura ablaze, Krishna and Balarama merely use their powers to go to Dvaraka unscathed.

Jarasandha thinks that Krishna has died and returns to his own land. But in a short while, when Jarasandha was sitting in Dratharashtras court learns that Krishna has only changed the capital.

=== Later life and death ===
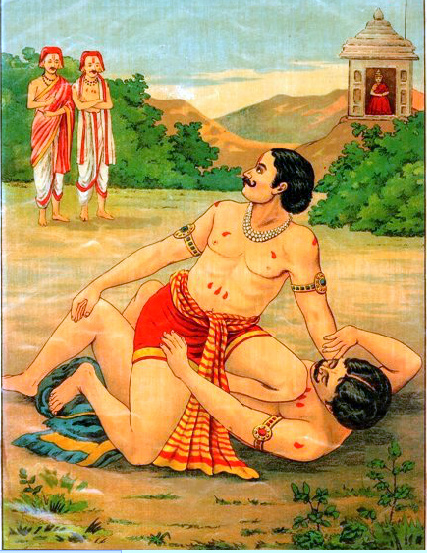
Bhima fights with Jarasandha

In the Sabha Parva of Mahabharata, Jarasandha fought with Karna after the svayamvara of daughter of Chitrangada of Kalinga. After a tough fight, Karna defeated him. To please Karna, Jarasandha gifted him the land of Malini to rule.

He was also a major hurdle before emperor Yudhishthira when the latter decided to perform an offering. As Jarasandha was a powerful warrior, it was necessary for the Pandavas to eliminate him. Krishna, Bhima, and Arjuna disguised as brahmins traveled to Magadha and met Jarasandha. After a formal meeting, Jarasandha enquired about their intentions. Krishna, Bhima, and Arjuna revealed their actual identities. Krishna challenged Jarasandha to a duel, allowing him to choose his opponent. Jarasandha, eyeing the trio, picked Bhima, deeming him the strongest and considering Krishna inferior. Both skilled wrestlers, Bhima and Jarasandha clashed fiercely for a time.

As the duel went on, Jarasandha grew weary while Bhima remained steadfast. The combat raged for fourteen days with neither fighter claiming victory. Eventually, Bhima seized Jarasandha by the legs and tore his body apart, but to his shock, the two halves rejoined, and Jarasandha stood whole again. During one of their battles, Krishna picked up a blade of grass, split it in two, and cast the pieces in opposite directions. Bhima understood the metaphor, once more grabbed Jarasandha by the legs and tore him in two. This time, he threw the halves far in opposite directions, preventing them from reuniting and killing Jarasandha. Jarasandha was killed by Bhima in Girivraja the capital of Jarasandha mentioned in Mahabharata, and many scholars identified this Girivraja of Mahabharata with modern Rajgir

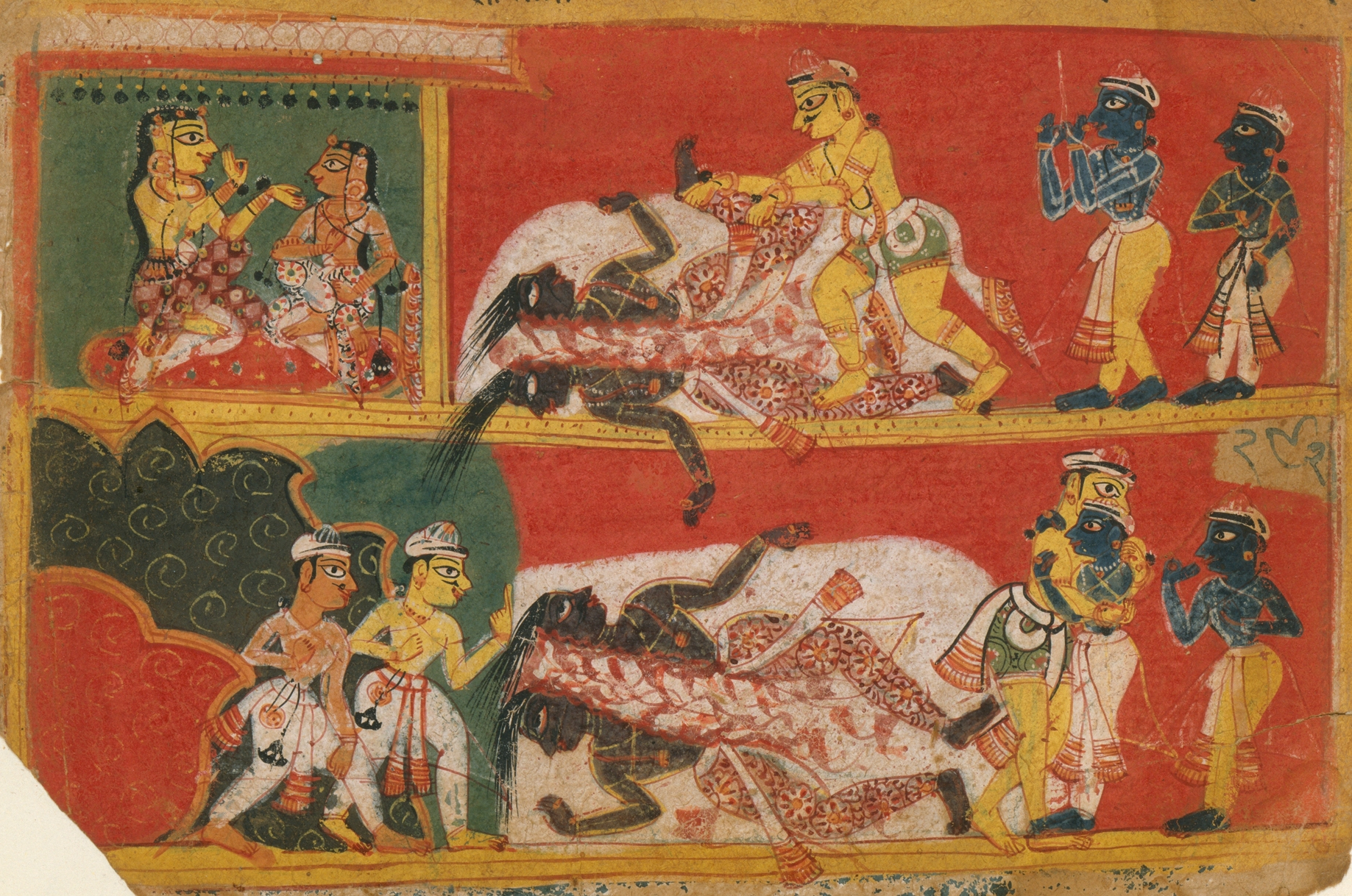
Bhima slays Jarasandha in wrestling fight.

Jarasandha's son Sahadeva (not to be confused with the youngest Pandava) was placed on the throne of Magadha and he agreed to be a vassal to the Pandavas. He was killed in the Kurukshetra War by Karna along with his cousin, Jayadeva.
