= Uparichara Vasu =

King in Hindu texts

- Texts: Puranas, Mahabharata

Genealogy
- Parents: Kruti (father)
- Spouse: Girika
- Children: Brihadratha, Pratyagraha, Kusambu, Mavella, and Yadunabha; Matsya (adopted), Satyavati
- Dynasty: Chandravamsha

Uparichara Vasu (Sanskrit: उपरिचरवसु, romanized: Uparicara Vasu, lit. 'Vasu, Who wanders above' IAST: UparicaraVasu [upəɾɪt͡ʃəɾəʋəs̪u]) is a king featured in Hindu literature, a member of the Chandravamsha (Lunar dynasty). The son of Kṛti, he rules over the kingdom of Chedi. He is described to be a friend of Indra and a great devotee of Vishnu in the Puranas. His legend is also described in the Mahabharata.

== Etymology ==
He was originally named Vasu. He received the title of Uparichara after Indra, pleased with him, granted him a Vimana (flying chariot). This chariot enabled him to wander (chara) above (upari) all mortals.

महाभारतम् आदिपर्व ६४

दैवोपभोग्यं दिव्यं त्वामाकाशे स्फाटिकं महत्। आकाशगं त्वां मद्दत्तं विमानमुपपत्स्यते॥१३॥
त्वमेकः सर्वमर्त्येषु विमानवरमास्थितः। चरिष्यस्युपरिस्थो हि देवो विग्रहवानिव॥१४॥

— Mahabharata
Translation:
Mahabharata - Volume 1 - Adi Parva - 064

The celestial chariot, enjoyable to the deities and beautifully crystalline in the sky, that I have graciously bestowed upon you will come to you.(13)
You alone, on the splendid chariot, residing above all mortals, will wander above, like the embodiment of the divine.(14)

== Legend ==
=== Puranas ===
The Skanda Purana and the Vayu Purana state that Uparichara Vasu is a king so pious that he is able to ride his chariot across the sky. When there is a dispute that arises between the devas and the sages about the interpretation of the term 'Aja' in a Vedic injunction that prescribed for a sacrificial offering, they decide to go to Uparichara Vasu for arbitration. The sages state that such a sacrifice must be performed using grains ( a+ja= not giving birth), and the devas insist that such a sacrifice must be performed using animals such as goats (aja). The king rules in favour of the devas. The sages, angry that the king had advocated against ahimsa, cursed him to fall towards the netherworld. He is saved by Garuda upon the instruction of Vishnu, who brings him to Svarga. The Skanda Purana states that the king is punished because he once sees a mind-born daughter of the Pitrs named Acchoda, and an apsara named Adrika. Because they regard each other as father and daughter, they are cursed by the Pitrs to be born on earth.

=== Mahabharata ===
The Mahabharata narrates that a mountain in the king's domain, Kolahala, was once maddened by lust, and attacked a river, blocking her path. The river sought the protection of Uparichara Vasu, who split the mountain with a kick, allowing the river to pass through. By the union of the mountain and the river, a man and a woman emerged. The boy was made commander-in-chief of Vasu's army, while the girl, Girika, was married to Vasu.

Uparichara Vasu's wife, Girika, having purified herself after bathing, informed her husband that it was an auspicious time for them to engage in intercourse. During this period, the king is also visited by his Pitrs, who wish him to hunt some deer for them. Deciding to prioritise the instructions of his ancestors, the king sets out to the forest to hunt, thinking about his beautiful wife. When he ejaculates, he decides that it would not be appropriate to waste his semen during his wife's ovulation. Depositing the semen on a leaf, he requests a hawk to carry his seed to his wife. While the hawk is flying, it is attacked by another hawk, and the semen falls into the river Yamuna. The semen is swallowed by a fish, the rebirth of Adrika. When a fisherman cuts open the belly of the fish, he finds a human boy and a girl within. The children are brought to Uparichara Vasu, who adopts the male child, naming his Matsya, who becomes his heir. The girl is adopted by the fisherman, and is named Satyavati.

In the text, the king is described to be the disciple of Sage Brihaspati, living in the Satya Yuga. The sage teaches him the Satvata Shastra, the knowledge of which guides his rule, and due to which he becomes a patron of the Pancharatra rituals dedicated to Narayana. The epic also describes a legend in which Uparichara Vasu commences an ashvamedha sacrifice, but orders that no animals be slain. Instead, he offers the products of the forests to the devas, who come to receive his offerings. Vishnu is so pleased by this act that he appears at the ritual site, but allows only the king to witness him. This angers Brihaspati, but the king reminds his preceptor that witnessing Vishnu is entirely up to him, describing it to be akin to a prasada.

== In Buddhism ==
In Buddhist literature, Uparicara Vasu appears as Upacara (later known as Apacara), the ancient ruler of the Ceti (Cedi) kingdom from the capital city of Sotthivatī, and a previous birth of Devadatta. He is placed in the primordial solar dynasty descended from Mahāsammata and Mandhātā as the son of King Cara.

He is the central figure of the Cetiya Jātaka (Jātaka No. 422), which parallels the Mahabharata account of Uparichara sinking into the earth after uttering a falsehood. Like his Hindu counterpart, King Upacara originally possesses four supernatural faculties—including the ability to walk on the sky, four guardian deities defending him with drawn swords, and bodily fragrances of sandalwood and lotus. His royal priest, "Kapila", is identified as the Bodhisatta.

Till his reign, no human has lied yet. To fulfill a boyhood promise to install Kapila's younger brother Korakalamba as royal chaplain, the king tells the first lie in human history by falsely declaring Korakalamba to be the elder brother. Despite Kapila's repeated warnings to speak the truth, Upacara repeats the lie seven times; with each falsehood, his four supernatural powers vanish one by one, his body emits foul odors, and he sinks progressively deeper into the earth until the flames of Avīci hell swallow him. Following the king's demise, Kapila instructs Upacara's five sons to leave Sotthivatī and establish five new kingdoms—Hatthipura (elephant-city), Assapura (horse-city), Sīhapura (lion-city), Uttarapañcāla, and Daddarapura. The animate mountain motif in Hinduism also appears here as Daddara-pura was founded on a spot where two mountains rubbing together made the sound "daddara...daddara".

== In Jainism ==
In Jain literature, Uparichara Vasu appears simply as King Vasu, an ancient ruler of the Ikshvaku dynasty in Ayodhya, rather than the king of Chedi. His legend is recounted in major Jain texts such as Vimalasuri's Paumacariya and Hemachandra's Triṣaṣṭi śalākāpuruṣa caritra, where it serves as an origin story explaining the introduction of animal sacrifice (yajna) and emphasizing the core Jain tenet of non-violence (ahimsa).

According to Jain tradition, Vasu was renowned for his strict adherence to truth, which endowed him with a magical crystal throne (sphaṭika-āsana) that hovered in the air. Before renouncing worldly life to become a Jain monk, Vasu's royal preceptor, Kṣīrakadamba, imparted sacred teachings to his own son, Parvataka, and a Brahmin disciple named Narada.

A theological dispute later arose between Parvataka and Narada regarding the meaning of the Sanskrit term aja in Vedic sacrificial texts. Narada maintained that aja referred to three-year-old barley grains incapable of sprouting—a bloodless offering aligned with ahimsa—whereas Parvataka argued that the term meant a goat, advocating animal slaughter. The two agreed to let King Vasu arbitrate, trusting his floating crystal throne as proof of his impartiality and truthfulness.

Prior to the judgment, Parvataka's mother secretly appealed to Vasu to rule in her son's favor. Out of partiality, Vasu knowingly uttered a falsehood and declared that aja signified a goat. As a consequence of this first recorded lie, his crystal throne crashed to the ground, the earth split open beneath him, and Vasu was swallowed alive into hell (Naraka). Jain texts cite this event as the tragic beginning of violent animal sacrifices in the world.
