= Chamba =

Chamba may refer to:

== People ==
- Gilberto Chamba (born 1961), Ecuadorian serial killer
- Jessica Chamba (born 1981), European activist

== Places ==
=== Ghana ===
- Chamba, a town in the Northern Region

=== India ===
- Chamba, Himachal Pradesh, city in Himachal Pradesh
  - Chamba district, Himachal Pradesh
  - Chamba (Vidhan Sabha constituency), Himachal Pradesh
  - Chamba State, former princely state
- Chamba, Uttarakhand, small town in Tehri-Garhwal district, Uttarakhand

=== Iran ===
- Chamba, Khuzestan, a village in Khuzestan Province
- Chamba, Zanjan, a village in Zanjan Province

=== Pakistan ===
- Chamba, Abbottabad, a village in Abbottabad district
- Chamba, Mansehra, a village in Mansehra district

== Other uses ==
- Chamba language (disambiguation), several languages
- Chamba people, ethnic group in Nigeria and Cameroon
- Chamba goat, a Himalayan breed
- es:Chamba, a slang word used by some Spanish speaking people to denote "work"
- Chamba or Malawi Gold, a popular strain of marijuana
- Chambá, a local name for the medicinal plant Justicia pectoralis

== See also ==
- Chambas, a municipality and town in Ciego de Ávila Province, Cuba
- Champa (disambiguation)
- Chumba (disambiguation)
- La Chamba, a commune in central France
- "La Chamba" (song), by Arcángel and Peso Pluma
- Chambeali, a Western Pahari (Indo-Aryan) language spoken in Chamba, Himachal Pradesh, India
