= Anga =

Ancient kingdom of India

Aṅga
- Unknown (~1100 BCE)–c. 530 BCE
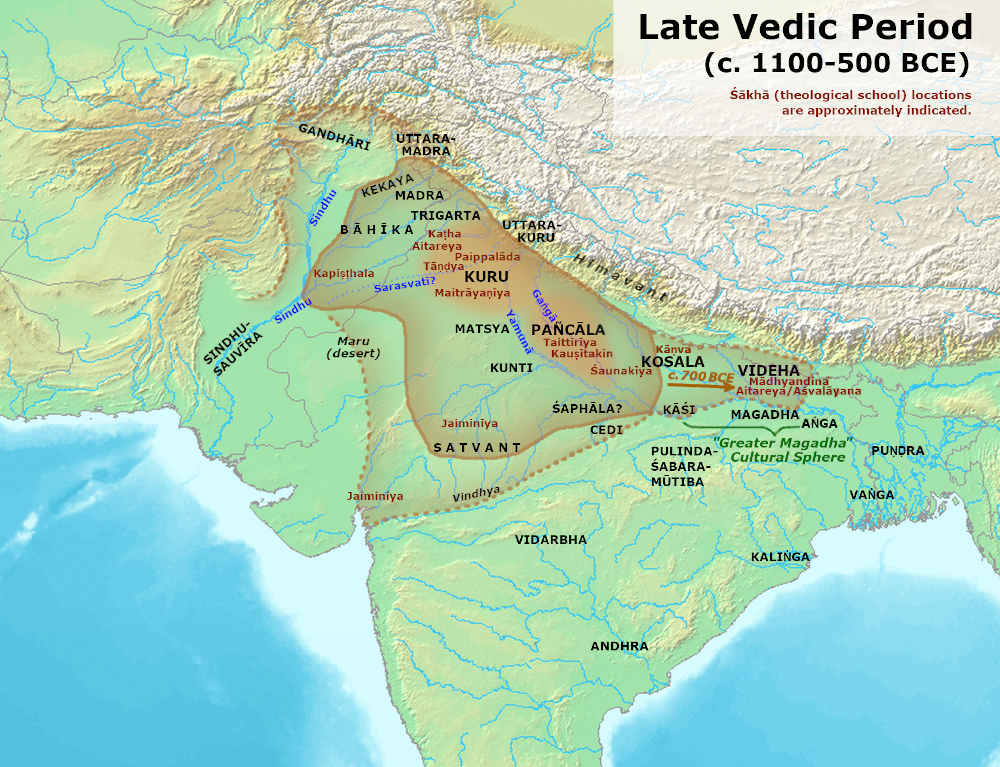
- Aṅga and other kingdoms of the late Vedic period

- Aṅga and other Mahajanapadas in the Post Vedic period Aṅga is the easternmost, south of Vajji and east of Magadha
- Capital: Champapuri (near modern Bhagalpur) and Malini (near modern Munger), Bihar
- Religion: Historical Vedic religion Jainism; Buddhism
- Government: Monarchy
- Karna; Brahmadatta
- Raja (King)
- Historical era: Iron Age
  - Established: Unknown (~1100 BCE)
  - Disestablished: c. 530 BCE
Succeeded by
Magadha

Anga (Note: Sanskrit: अङ्ग, IAST: Aṅga) was an ancient Indo-Aryan tribe of eastern South Asia whose existence is attested during the Iron Age. The members of the Aṅga tribe were called the Āṅgeyas.

Counted among the "sixteen great nations" in Buddhist texts like the Anguttara Nikaya, Aṅga also finds mention in the Jain Vyakhyaprajnapti's list of ancient janapadas.

== Location ==
Anga proper was located between the Champa river to the west and the Rajmahal hills to the east. However, at times, its territories did extend to the sea in the south, or included Magadha in the west.

The capital of Anga, named Champapuri, was located at the confluence of the Champa and Ganga rivers, and corresponds to the modern-day area of Champapuri and Champanagar in Bhagalpur the eastern part of the Indian state of Bihar. According to the Jatakas, Champa was also called Kala-Champa, while Puranic texts claim its ancient name was Malini.

The other important cities within the Anga kingdom included Assapura (Sanskrit: Ashvapura) and Bhaddiya (Sanskrit: Bhadrika).

== Etymology ==
According to the Mahabharata (I.104.53–54) and Puranic literature, Aṅga was named after Prince Anga, the founder of the kingdom, and the son of Vali, who had no sons. So, he requested the sage, Dirghatamas, to bless him with sons. The sage is said to have begotten five sons through his wife, the queen Sudesna. The princes were named Aṅga, Vaṅga, Kaliṅga, Sumha and Pundra.

The Ramayana (1.23.14) narrates the origin of name Aṅga as the place where Kamadeva was burnt to death by Siva and where his body parts (aṅgas) are scattered.

== Early history ==
Aṅga was first mentioned in the Atharvaveda, where it was connected to the Gāndhārīs, Mūjavats, and Māgadhīs. The founder of Aṅga might have been the king Aṅga Vairocana, who is mentioned in the Aitareya Brāhmaṇa as a ruler who had been consecrated by the Aryan ritual of Aindra mahābhiśeka.

Vedic literature such as the Baudhāyana Dharmasūtra nevertheless listed the Āṅgeyas with peoples described as being of "mixed origin."

Aṅga was a powerful kingdom at the time of the Aitareya Brāhmaṇa, which mentions the "world conquest" of one of the Āṅgeya kings. The Āṅgeya capital of Campā itself was counted until the time of the Buddha's death among the six most prominent cities of northern India, along with Rājagaha, Sāvatthī, Sāketa, Kosāmbī, and Vārāṇasī.

During the Iron Age, Aṅga expanded to include Vaṅga within its borders, with the capital city of Campā being a wealthy commercial centre from where traders sailed to Suvarṇabhūmi. According to the Kathā-sarit-sāgara, the Āṅgeya city of Viṭaṅkapura was located on the shores of the sea.

During the 6th century BCE, the king of Aṅga was Dadhivāhana, who was married to the Licchavika princess Padmāvatī, who was herself the daughter of the consul of the Licchavika republic, Ceṭaka. Ceṭaka's sister Trisalā was the mother 24th Jain Tīrthaṅkara, Mahāvīra, thus making Ceṭaka his uncle and Padmāvatī his cousin; Ceṭaka himself had become an adept of the teachings of Mahāvīra and made the Licchavika capital of Vesālī a bastion of Jainism, and the marriages of his daughters contributed to the spreading of Jainism across northern India. The daughter of Dadhivāhana and Padmāvatī, Candanā or Candrabālā, became the first woman convert to Jainism shortly after Mahāvīra attained Kevala.

Under Dadhivāhana's rule, Aṅga had conquered its western neighbour, the state of Magadha, hence why the Vidhura Paṇḍita Jātaka described the Māgadhī capital of Rājagaha as a city of Aṅga. This conquest brought Aṅga in direct contact with Magadha's western neighbour Vatsa, whose king Śatānīka attacked the Āṅgeya capital of Campā out of fear of Dadhivāhana's expansionism. Dadhivāhana instead sought friendly relations with Vatsa, and he gave his daughter in marriage to Śatānīka's son, Udayana. After Śatānīka's death from dysentery at the same time as a campaign against Vatsa was being carried out by the king Pradyota of Avanti, the latter became the overlord of Vatsa, and Udayana lived as a captive at the court of Pradyota, in Ujjenī.

During Udayana's captivity, the state of Kaliṅga attacked Aṅga and took Dadhivāhana captive. It was once Pradyota had restored Udayana to his throne, after the latter's marriage to his daughter Vāsavadattā, that Udayana was able to defeat Kaliṅga and restore Dadhivāhana on the Āṅgeya throne, and Dadhivāhana's daughter Priyadarśikā was married to Udayana; according to the later play Priyadarśikā, which itself rests on historical records, the Āṅgeya chamberlain took brought her into the refuge of the forest-king Vindhyaketu, from where she was captured by Udayana's army and, given the name Āraṇyikā ("she who is from the forest") after being assumed to be Vindhyaketu's daughter, was brought to Vatsa to become servant of Vāsavadattā, and later married Udayana after the Āṅgeya chamberlain recognised her as once Udayana had defeated Kaliṅga.

Aṅga's prosperity ended when, in the middle of the 6th century BCE, the Māgadhī crown prince Bimbisāra Śreṇika avenged his father's defeat against Aṅga by defeating and killing the Āṅgeya king Brahmadatta, after which Aṅga became part of the Māgadhī empire, and Campā became the seat of a Māgadhī viceroy.

== Later history ==
During his pilgrimage there in the end of the 4th century, the Chinese monk Faxian noted the numerous Buddhist temples that still existed in Campā, transliterated Chanpo in Chinese (瞻波 pinyin: Zhānbō; Wade–Giles: Chanpo) (Note: Campā (Indian, not Vietnamese) was also transliterated, besides 瞻波, in the records as Zhanbopo (瞻博婆) and Zhanpo (瞻婆、瞻匐、瞻蔔、詹波、闡蔔、閻波、占波)). The kingdom of Aṅga by then had long ceased to exist; it had been known as Yāngjiā (鴦伽) in Chinese. (Note: Anga was also transliterated, besides 鴦伽, in the records as 鴦迦 (different radical for jiā), 泱伽 (same pronunciation), Yāngjué (鴦掘), Àng'é (盎誐). Sometimes by metonymy, the kingdom would be called the 'State of Champa'‘’, i.e., 瞻波國.)

== Varman rule on Anga ==
In the 11th–12th century, Anga region was under the control of Varman dynasty. Belava copperplate of Bhojavarman mentions that Jatavarman under the leadership of his father Vajravarman conquered Anga and established the rule of his family.

== See also ==
- Anga (region)
- Magadha
- Anga Lipi
- Mahajanapadas
- Magadha-Anga war
- History of India
- History of Hinduism
