= Magadha–Anga war =

War in Ancient India

- Pre-war Magadha and Anga in north-eastern region
Date	540–535 BCE
Location	Modern-day Bihar, India
Result	Magadhī victory
Territorial changes	Magadhī annexation of Anga

Belligerents
Magadha	Anga

Commanders and leaders
Bimbisara	Brahmadatta †

Strength
Unknown	Unknown (but less)

The Magadha–Anga war was a conflict between the Haryanka dynasty of Magadha and the neighbouring Anga Kingdom. The conflict ended in defeat of the Anga kingdom and the Magadha annexed their territory.

Brahmadatta was older contemporary to Bimbisara of Magadha. He defeated Bhattiya, father of Bimbisara. After assention to the throne of Magadha Bimbisara avenged his father's defeat and killed Brahmadatta. The campaign was successful, Anga was annexed, and Prince Ajatashatru was appointed Governor of Champa.

== See also ==
- List of wars involving Magadha
