= Champa (disambiguation) =

Champa was a set of polities in what is now south and central Vietnam.

Champa may also refer to:

== Arts and entertainment ==
- Champa (novel), by Laxmi Prasad Devkota, c. 1947
- Champa, a Dragon Ball character

== People ==
- Champa (actress) (born 1965), Bangladeshi actress
- Chandrashekhar Patil (1939–2022), popularly known as Champa, Kannada-language writer
- Changpa, or Champa, a semi-nomadic Tibetan people
- Champa people, or Chams

== Places in India ==
- Janjgir–Champa district, Chhattisgarh
  - Champa, Chhattisgarh
- Champa, Madhubani, Bihar
- Champapuri, Bihar, on the site of an ancient city Champa

== Other uses ==
- Plumeria alba, or champa, a flowering plant

== See also ==
- Campa (disambiguation)
- Chamba (disambiguation)
- Champ (disambiguation)
- Champagne (disambiguation)
- Champasak (disambiguation)
- Magnolia champaca, or champak, a large evergreen tree
