= Bassac =

Bassac may refer to:

- BASSAC, the British Association of Settlements and Social Action Centres, a membership body for British community organisations, including members of the settlement movement
- Bassac, Charente, a commune in the Charente department of France
- Beauregard-et-Bassac, Dordogne, France
- Bassac River, a distributary of the Tonle Sap and Mekong River
- An alternative spelling of Champasak (disambiguation), various places in Laos
- Bassac Theater a Cambodian theater genre
