= Malinipuri =

Malinipuri, also called Malini, is a city mentioned in the Sanskrit epic, the Mahabharatha. The city was given to Karna, a warrior and tragic hero of the epic, by Jarasandha, king of Magadha. Karna had sought out weapons instructions but was denied due to his mixed-caste background. He had helped Duryodhana abduct the princess of Kalinga and fought off all the other kings while doing so, including Jarasandha. After this, Jarasandha wanted to test Karna's strength and challenged him to a wrestling match. Karna "ruptured the seam" that held together Jarasandha's body, defeating him, and was given the city of Malini. After this he became "king of the Angas"; it is presumed that Duryodhana elevated Karna to the Anga throne following the wrestling incident.
