= Campa =

Campa may refer to:

== People with the surname ==
- Cesare Campa (born 1943), Italian politician
- Felipe Campa (born 1979), Mexican boxer
- Joe Campa, United States Navy sailor
- Miranda Campa (born 1914), Swiss-Italian actress
- Pio Campa (1881–1964), Italian actor
- Riccardo Campa (born 1967), Italian sociologist
- Roberto Campa (born 1957), Mexican lawyer and politician
- Valentín Campa (1904–1999), Mexican railway union leader and presidential candidate
- Ammar Campa-Najjar (born 1989), American Democratic politician
- Campa, alias of American music producer David Benjamin Singer-Vine of Terror Jr

== Other uses ==
- Asháninka, or Campa, an indigenous people living in Peru and Acre, Brazil
  - Campa languages
    - Asháninka language, also known as Campa
- Compensatory Afforestation Fund Act, 2016, or CAMPA Act (Compensatory Afforestation Management and Planning Authority), in India
- Câmpa, a tributary of the river Jiul de Est in Romania
- Campa Cola, a soft drink brand in India
- Champa or Campā, polities of south-east Asia

== See also ==
- Champa (disambiguation)
- La Campa, a municipality and small town in Honduras
