= Chamba language =

Chamba language may refer to:

- Akaselem language of Togo
- Chamba Daka or Chamba Leko of Nigeria and Cameroon
- two languages of Chamba, India:
  - the Sino-Tibetan Pattani language
  - the Indo-Aryan Chambeali language

== See also ==
- Chamba (disambiguation)
- Lahuli language (disambiguation)
