= Bimbisara =

Haryanka emperor from 544 to 492 BCE

Bimbisara 𑀩𑀺𑀫𑁆𑀩𑀺𑀲𑀸𑀭𑀸
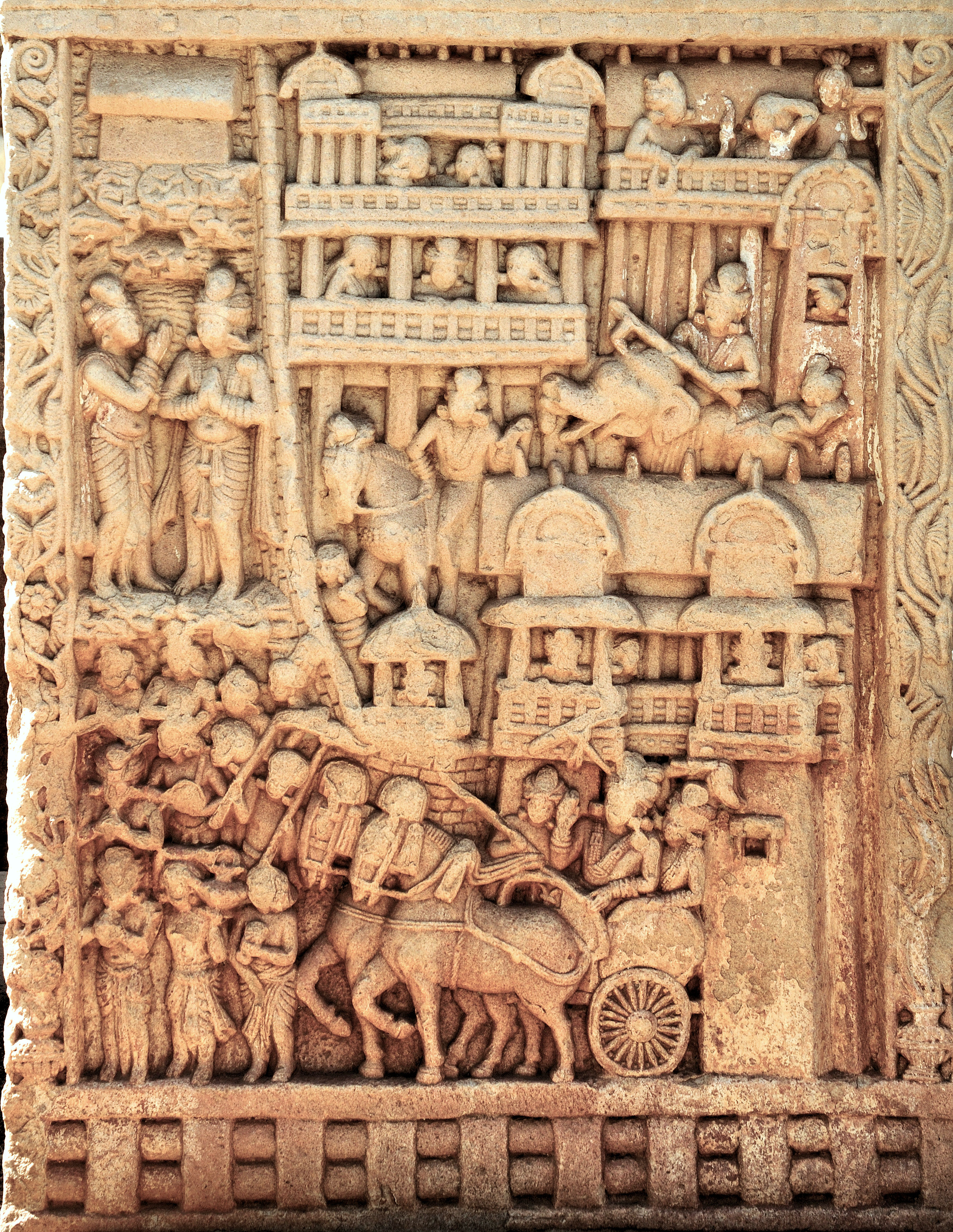
- Bimbisara with his royal cortege issuing from the city of Rajagriha to visit the Buddha.

King of Magadha
- Reign: c. 544 – c. 492 BCE or c. 457 – c. 405 BCE (52 years)
- Predecessor: Bhattiya (as Chieftain)
- Successor: Ajatashatru
- Dynasty: Haryanka
- Born: 558 BCE or 472 BCE
- Died: 491 BCE or 405 BCE; Bimbisar Jail, Rajgriha, Magadha, Haryanka Empire
- Spouse: Kosala Devī; Chellanā; Dharini; Kṣemā / Khemā; Nandā; Padmāvatī / Padumavatī; Ambapālī
- Issue: Ajatashatru
- Dynasty: Haryanka
- Father: Bhattiya

Bimbisāra (in Buddhist tradition) or Shrenika (Śreṇika) and Seniya (Seṇiya) in the Jain histories (c. 558 – c. 491 BCE or c. 472 – c. 405 BCE) was the King of Magadha (r. 543 – 492 BCE or r. 457 – 405 BCE) and belonged to the Haryanka dynasty. He was the son of Bhattiya. His expansion of the kingdom, especially his annexation of the kingdom of Anga to the east, is considered to have laid the foundations for the later expansion of the Mauryan Empire.

According to Jain tradition, he is said to be the first tirthankara (Padmanabha/Mahapadma) out of the 24 tirthankaras of the future cosmic age. He frequently visited the Samavasarana of Mahavira seeking answers to his queries.

According to Buddhist Tradition, he is also known for his cultural achievements and was a great friend and protector of the Buddha. According to the 7th-century Chinese monk Xuanzang, Bimbisara built the city of Rajgir (Rajagriha). He was succeeded on the throne by his son Ajatashatru.

== Life ==
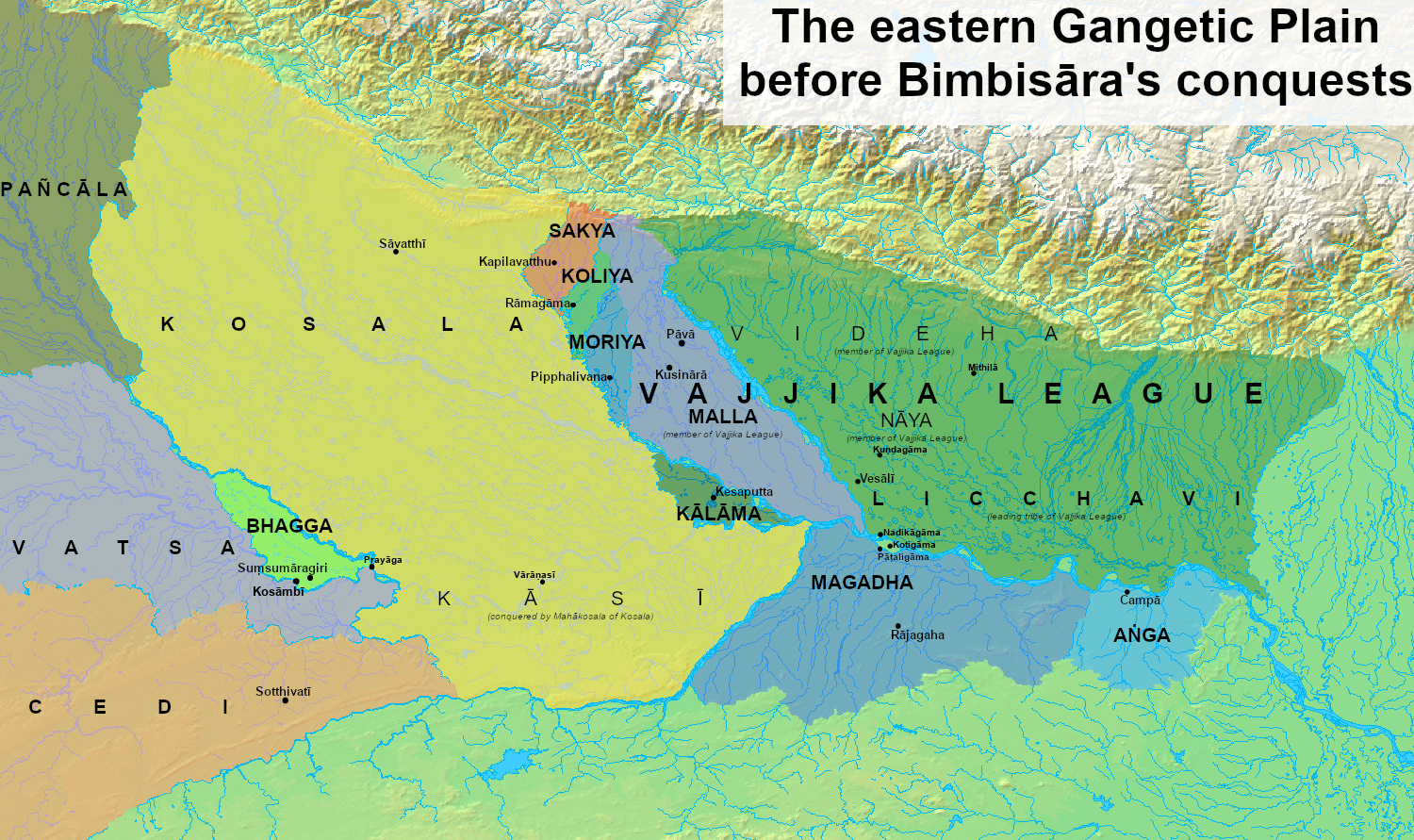
Map of the eastern Gangetic plain before Bimbisāra's conquests
(Licchavi's dependencies, in green, and Malla shown separately)

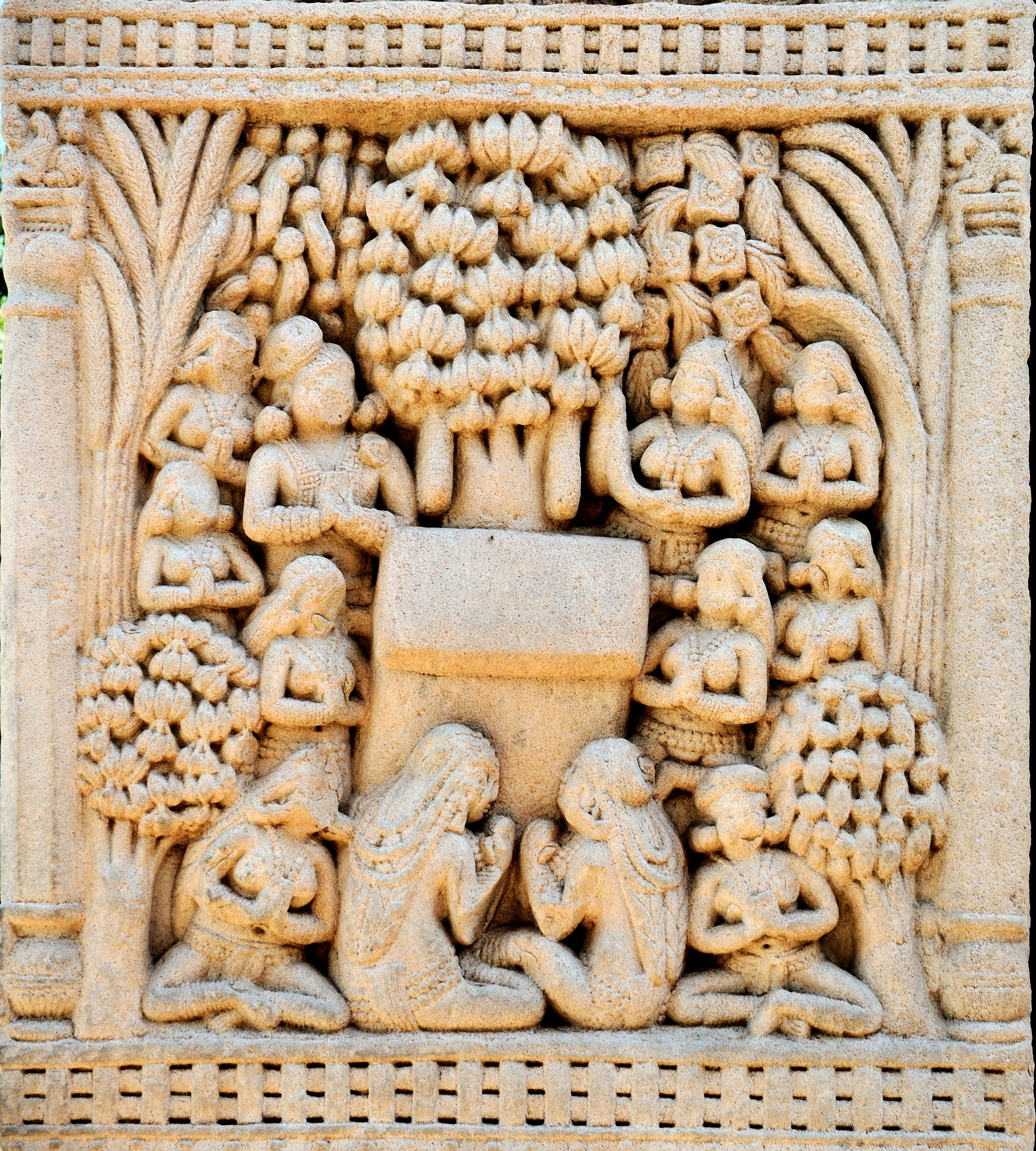
King Bimbisara visits the Bamboo Garden (Venuvana) in Rajagriha; artwork from Sanchi

Bimbisara was the son of Bhattiya, a chieftain. He ascended to throne at the age of 15 in 543 BCE. He established the Haryanka dynasty and laid the foundations of Magadha with the fortification of a village, which later became the city of Pataliputra. Bimbisara's first capital was at Girivraja (identified with Rajagriha). He led a military campaign against Anga, perhaps to avenge his father's earlier defeat at the hands of its king, Brahmadatta. The campaign was successful, Anga was annexed, and prince Kunika (Ajatashatru) was appointed governor at Champa. His conquest of Anga gave Magadha control over the routes to the Ganges Delta, which had important ports that gave access to the eastern coast of India. Pukkusati, the king of Gandhara, sent Bimbisara an embassy.

His court is said to have included Sona Kolivisa, Sumana (flower gatherer), Koliya (minister), Kumbhaghosaka (treasurer) and Jivaka (physician).

=== Marriage alliances ===
Bimbisara used marriage alliances to strengthen his position. His first wife was Kosala Devi, the daughter of Mahā Kosala, the king of Kosala, and a sister of Prasenajit. His bride brought him Kashi as dowry. This marriage also ended the hostility between Magadha and Kosala and gave him a free hand in dealing with the other states. His second wife, Chellana, was a Licchavi princess from Vaishali and daughter of the Jain king Chetaka. His third wife, Kshema, was a daughter of the chief of the Madra clan of Punjab. Mahavagga depicts him having 500 wives.

==== Death ====
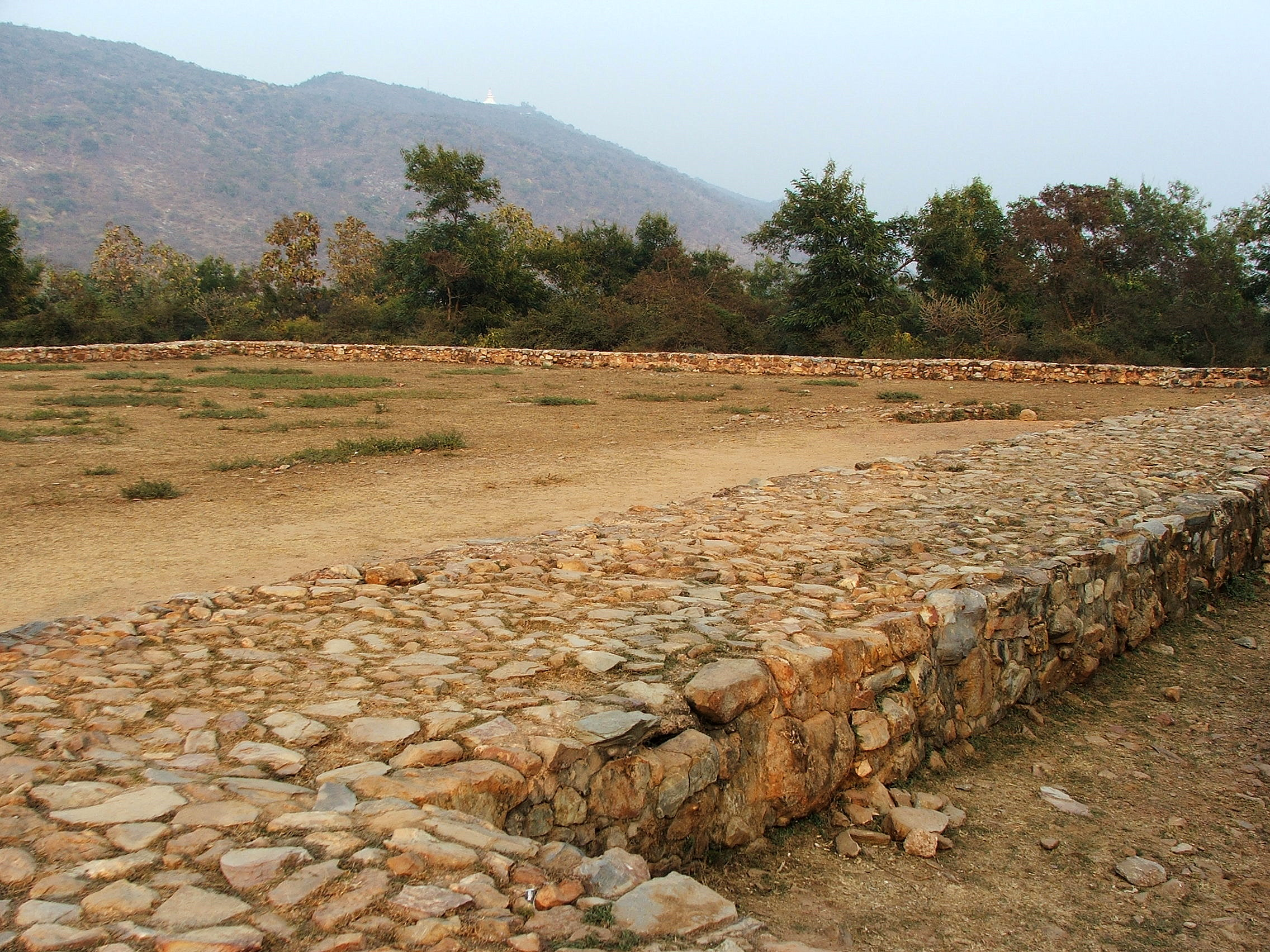
Bimbisara's jail, where King Bimbisāra was imprisoned, in Rajgir

As per Buddhism, due to influence by Devadatta (a separatist Buddhist monk), Bimbisāra was assassinated by his son Ajatashatru in c. 493 BCE, who then succeeded him to the throne. However, as per Jainism, Bimbisāra committed suicide.

== Traditional accounts ==
=== Jainism ===
Bimbisara is referred to as Shrenika of Rajgir in Jain literature who became a devotee of Jainism impressed by the calmness of Jain Muni Yamadhar. He frequently visited Samavasarana of Mahavira seeking answers to his queries. He asked about the jain Ramayana and an illuminating sage (King Prasanachandra). He is said to be a Balabhadra in one of his previous lives.

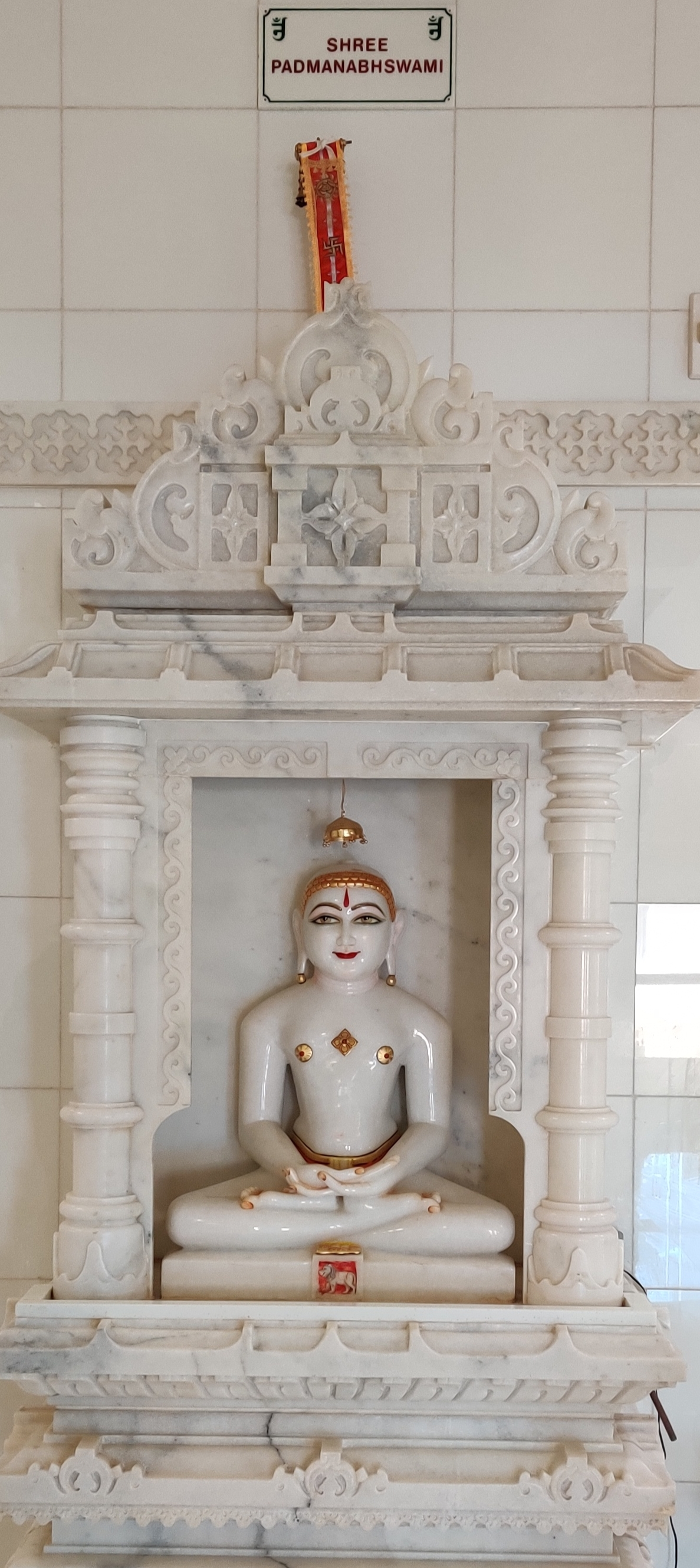
An idol of Padmanabh Swami (Shrenika Maharaja), the first Tirthankara of the next time cycle as per Śvetāmbara iconography at Jain Center of Southern California, Buena Park, California

Per Jain Scripture, Bimbisara killed himself in a fit of passion, after his son had imprisoned him. Consequently, he was reborn in hell, where he is currently residing, until the karma which led to his birth there comes to an end. It is further written, that he will be reborn as Mahapadma (sometimes called Padmanabha), the first in the chain of future tirthankaras who are to rise at the beginning of the upward motion (Utsarpini) of the next era of time.

=== Buddhism ===
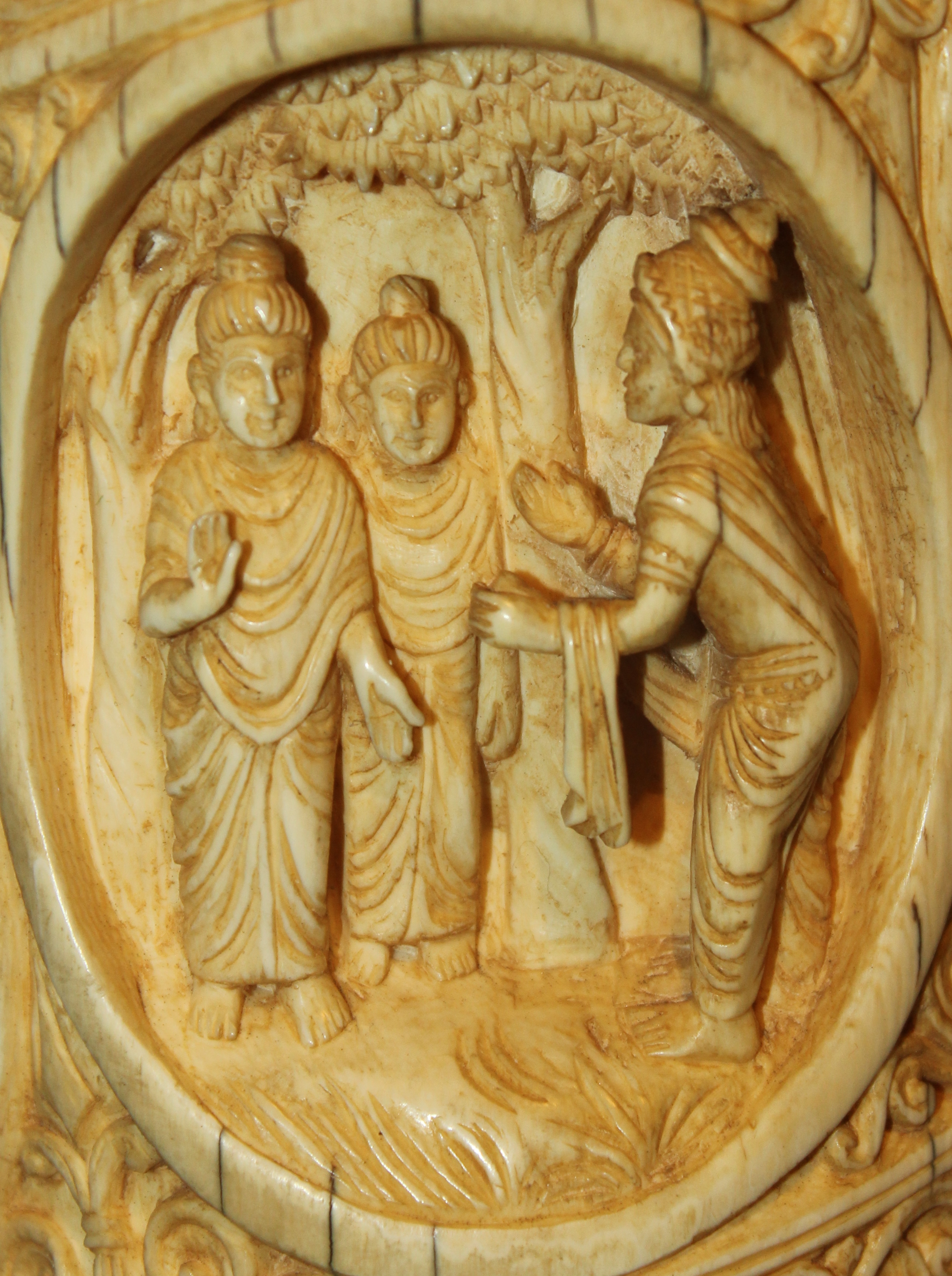
Bimbisara welcomes the Buddha

According to Buddhist scriptures, King Bimbisara met the Buddha for the first time prior to the Buddha's enlightenment, and later became an important disciple that featured prominently in certain Buddhist suttas. He is recorded to have attained sotapannahood, a degree of enlightenment in Buddhist teachings. Although Bimbisara let the women in his palace visit Buddha in his monastery in the evenings; the women wanted a hair-and-nail stupa they could use to venerate the Buddha any time. Bimbisara spoke with Buddha who complied with their request.

== See also ==
- Avanti-Magadhan Wars

Regnal titles
| Preceded by Bhattiya | King of Magadha; 543–491 BC | Succeeded by Ajatashatru |
