= Chandan River =

Major river in Asia

Coordinates: 24°55′42″N 86°54′39″E

Chandan Chanan
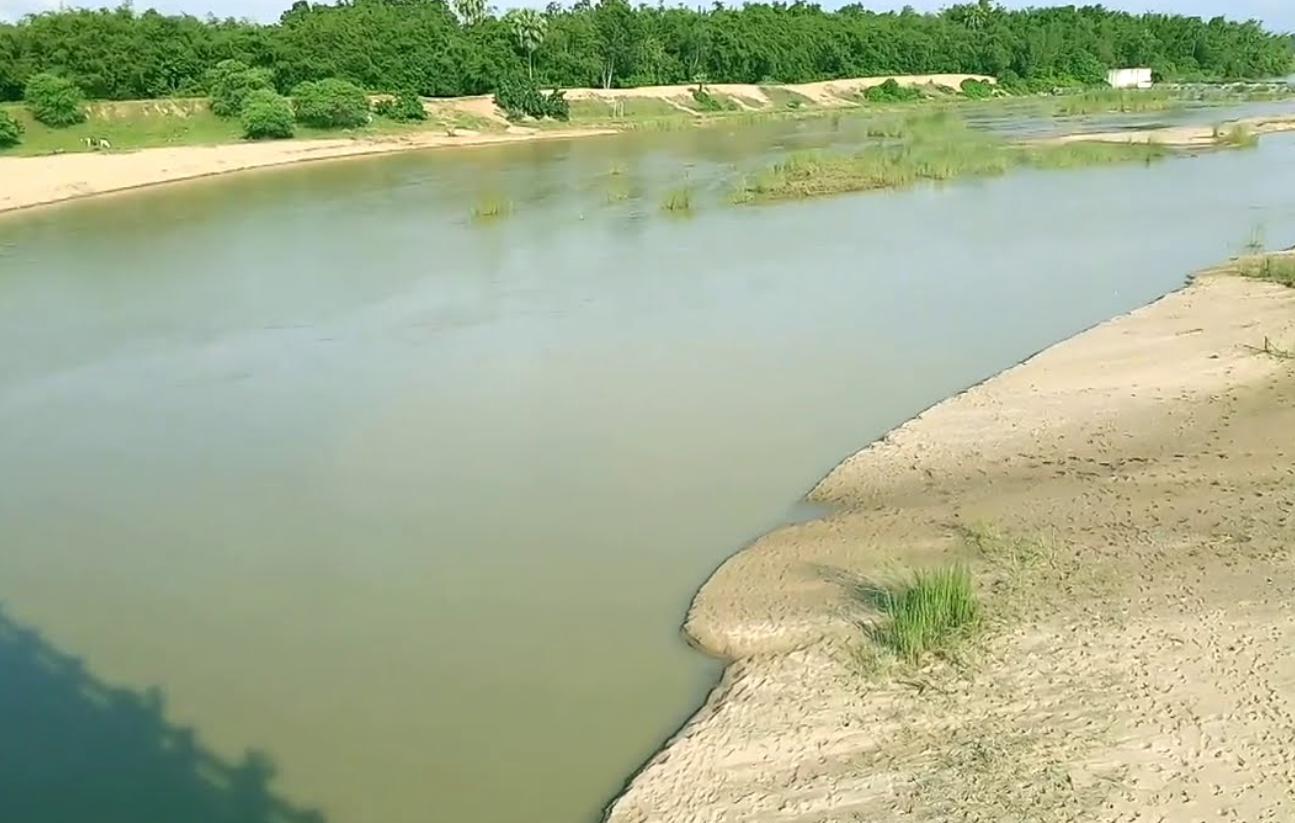
- Chanan River flowing in Banka

Location
- Country: India
- State: Bihar, Jharkhand
- Region: Anga
- Districts: Munger, Bhagalpur, Banka, Deoghar

The Chandan River also known as Chanan River flows in the districts of Munger, Bhagalpur and Banka in the state of Bihar, and Deoghar in the state of Jharkhand, India. It has been identified as probably being the river on whose banks was located the ancient city of Champa, capital of the Anga Mahajanapada. It would have then also been a border between Anga and its neighbour, Magadha.
