= Jessica Chamba =

Jessica Chamba (born November 16, 1981) is a European NGO activist.

== Life and education ==
Jessica Chamba, born as Jessica Pennet, was grown up in the Lyon area. She graduated in political science from Sciences Po in Paris in 2004 and currently runs consulting firm in health policy and social services. In 2009, she co-founded the consulting companyCekoïa Conseil, before joining Ernst & Young in 2019.

== NGO career ==
Jessica Chamba started her NGO career as president of the Sciences Po campus section of the Young European Federalists, the youth organization of the European Movement. Between 2003 and 2005, she served as president of the national section of this pro-European youth organization. During her term of office she led the pro-YES campaign for the referendum on the ratification of the Treaty establishing a Constitution for Europe in France, which was eventually rejected by 55% of the population. Despite this rejection, she contributed to establish JEF-France as the leading pro-European youth organization in France.

Subsequently, Chamba joined the steering committee of the European Movement and the Federal Committee of the Young European Federalists (JEF-Europe), the umbrella organization of the youth sections of the European Movement. Between 2007 and 2009, she served as senior vice president of JEF Europe, and in autumn 2008 she was elected vice president of the European Movement for a three years term.

== See also ==
- European Movement
- Young European Federalists
- Federal Europe
