= Chamba, Abbottabad =

Chamba
- Location within Pakistan
- Coordinates: 34.02°N 73.06°E
- Country: Pakistan
- Province: Khyber Pakhtunkhwa
- Elevation: 725 m (2,379 ft)
- Time zone: UTC+5 (PST)

Chamba is a village in the Khyber Pakhtunkhwa province of Pakistan. It is located at 34°2'0N 73°6'0E with an altitude of 725 metres (2381 feet).
