= Chamba, Mansehra =

Chamba
- Location within Pakistan
- Coordinates: 34.44°N 73.38°E
- Country: Pakistan
- Province: Khyber-Pakhtunkhwa
- Elevation: 2,571 m (8,435 ft)
- Time zone: UTC+5 (PST)

Chamba is a village of Mansehra District in Khyber-Pakhtunkhwa province of Pakistan. It is located at 34°44'35N 73°38'15E with an altitude of 2571 metres (8438 feet).
