= Chambeh =

Chambeh چمبه
- Village
- Location within Iran
- Coordinates: 31°10′52″N 49°10′53″E
- Country: Iran
- Province: Khuzestan
- County: Ahvaz
- Bakhsh: Central
- Rural District: Gheyzaniyeh

Population (2006)
  - Total: 71
- Time zone: UTC+3:30 (IRST)
  - Summer (DST): UTC+4:30 (IRDT)

Chambeh (Persian: چمبه; also known as Chamba and Chemba) is a village in Gheyzaniyeh Rural District, in the Central District of Ahvaz County, Khuzestan Province, Iran. At the 2006 census, its population was 71, in 17 families.
