= Brahmadatta of Anga =

Brahmadatta
- Raja

King of Anga
- Reign: 6th century BCE
- Successor: Office abolished (conquest of Anga by Bimbisara) Ajatashatru become the governor of Anga
- Died: Nearly after 543 BCE
- Religion: Jainism

Brahmadatta of Anga (6th century BCE) was an ancient Indian King of Anga.

== Life ==
Brahmadatta was older contemporary to Bimbisara, a renowned King in Jain literature contemporary to Mahavira of Magadha. He defeated Bhatiya, father of Bimbisara. After ascending to the throne of Magadha, Bimbisara avenged his father's defeat and killed Brahmadatta. The campaign was successful, Anga was annexed, and prince Kunika (Ajatashatru) was appointed governor at Champa.

== See also ==
- Bimbisara
- Anga
