= Magadha =

Region and Mahajanapada in ancient eastern India

Kingdom of Magadha
- Unknown (by 1200 BCE) – 625 CE
- Kingdom of Magadha and other Mahajanapadas during the second urbanisation

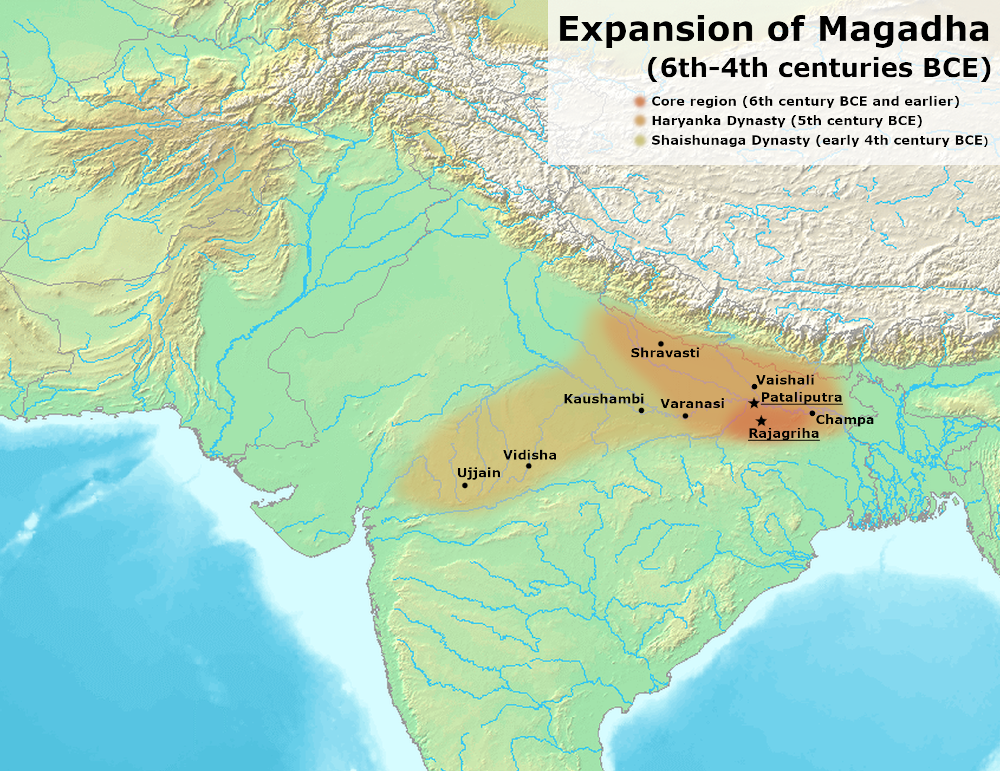
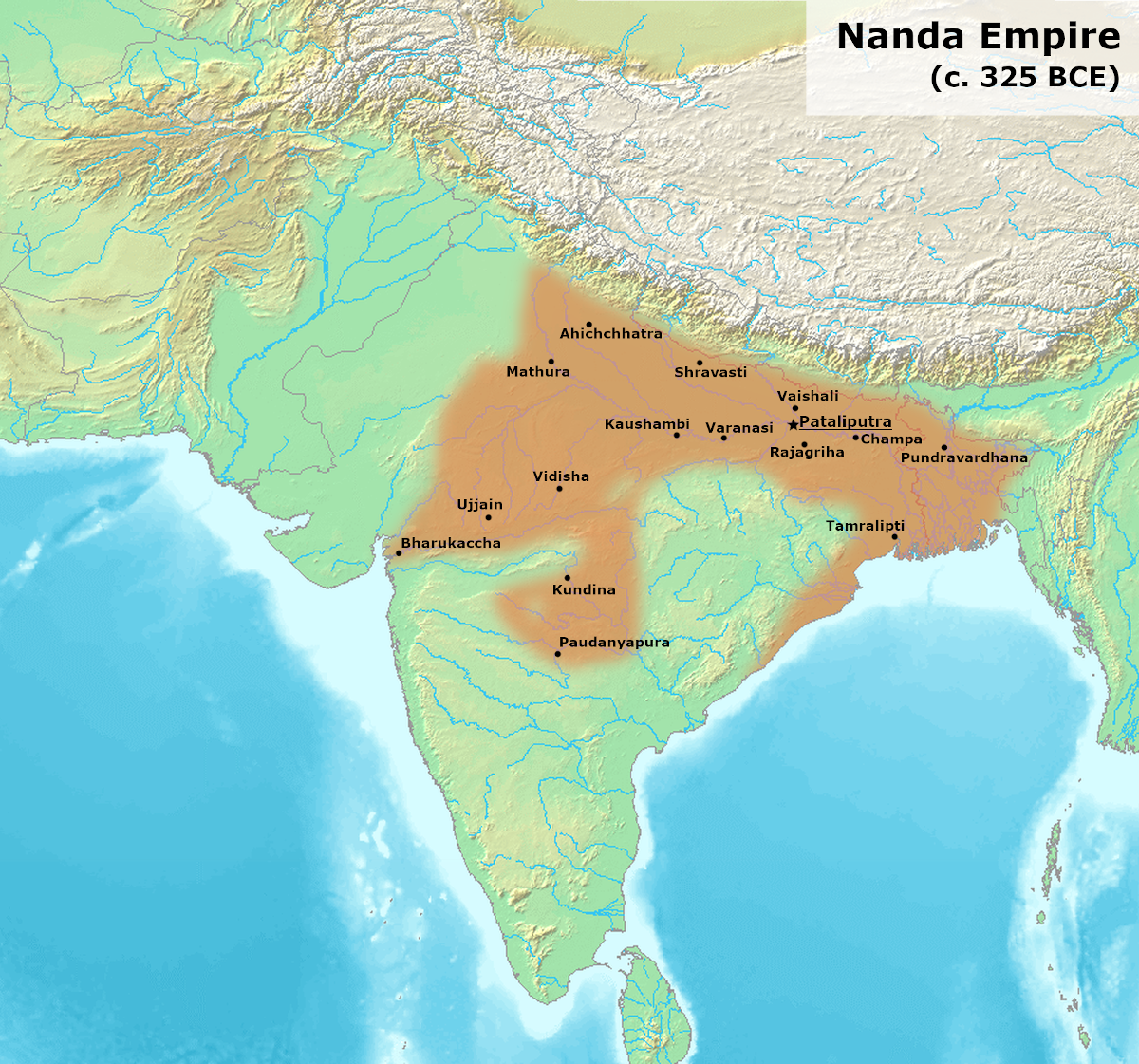
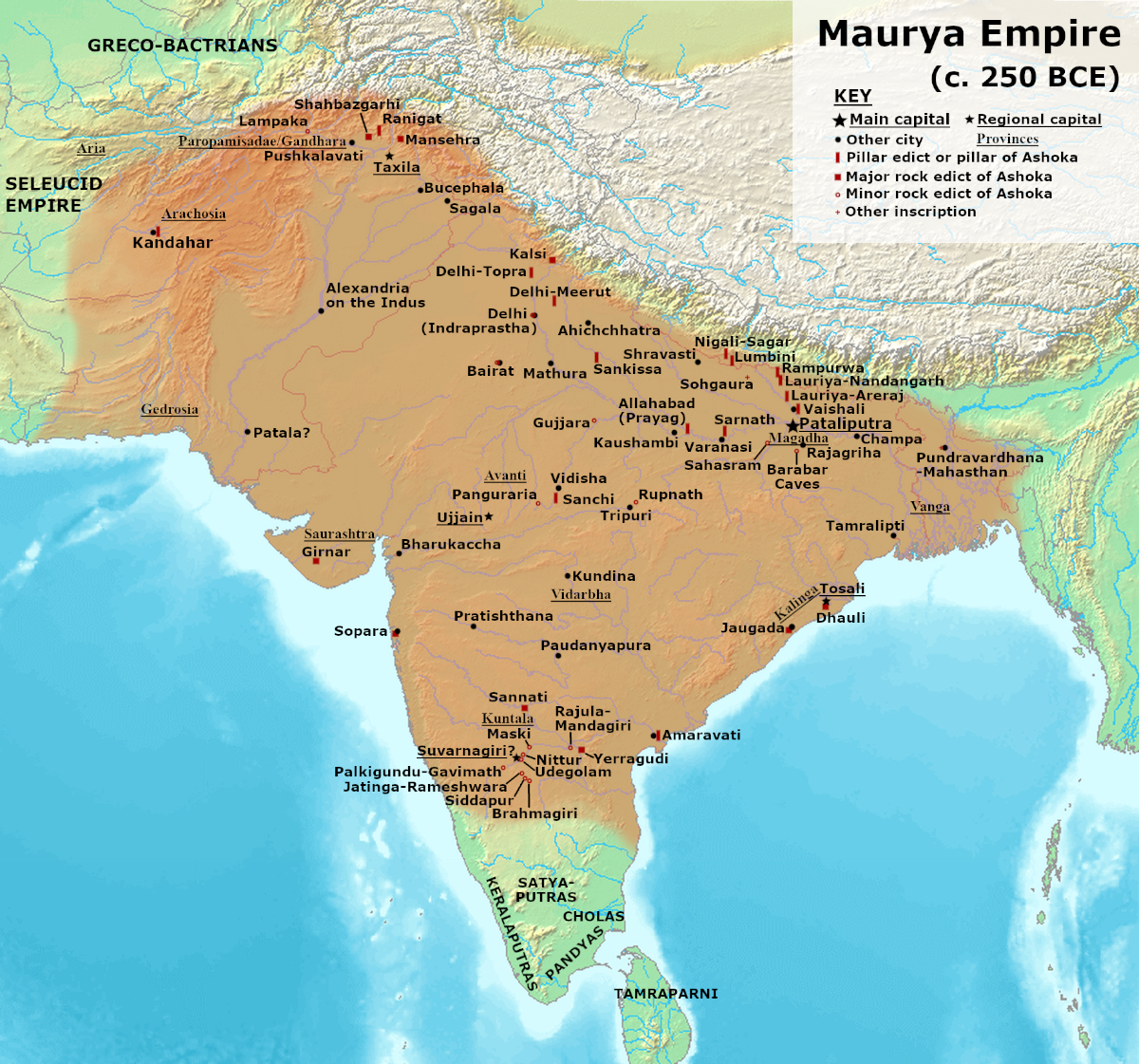
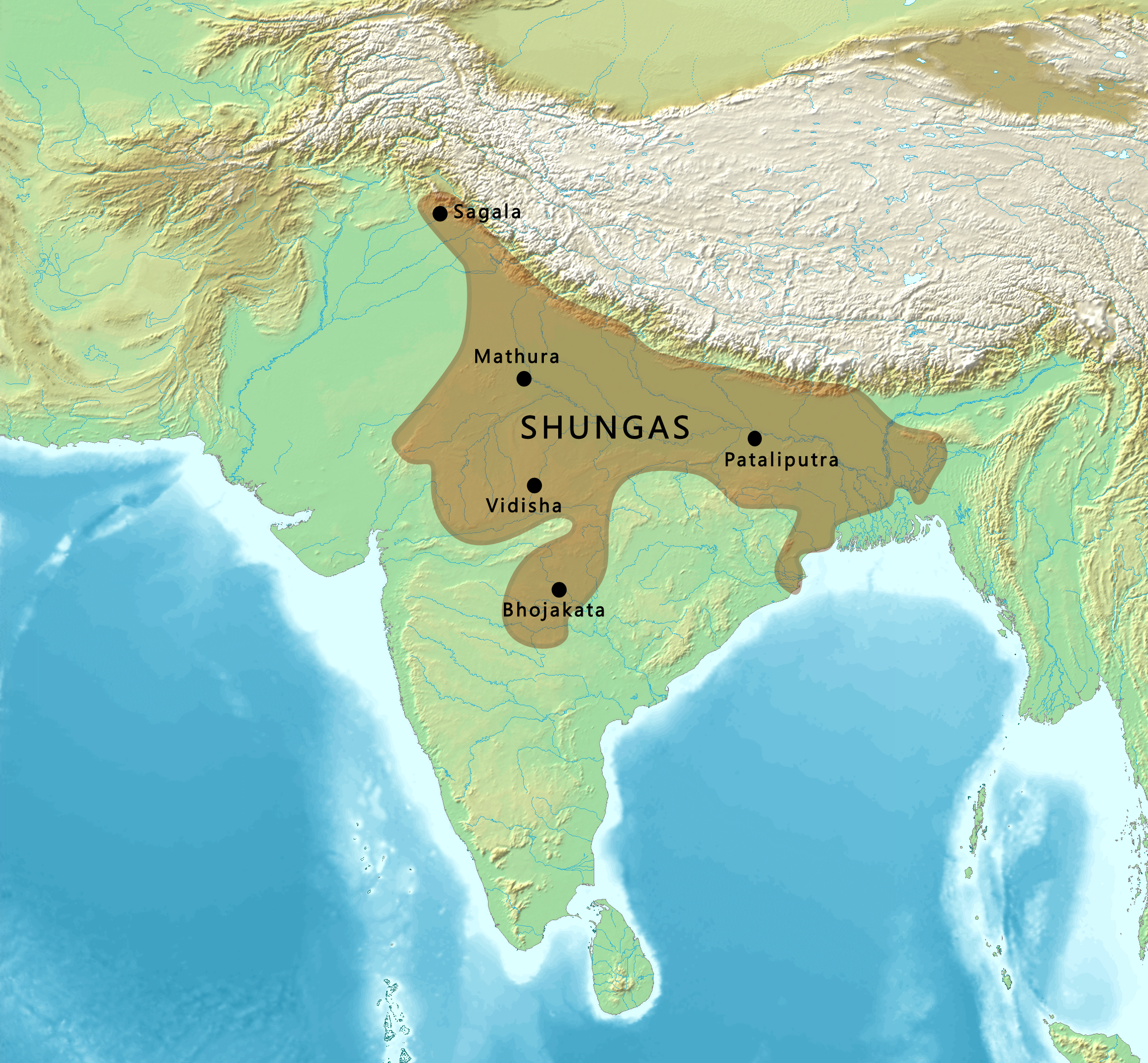
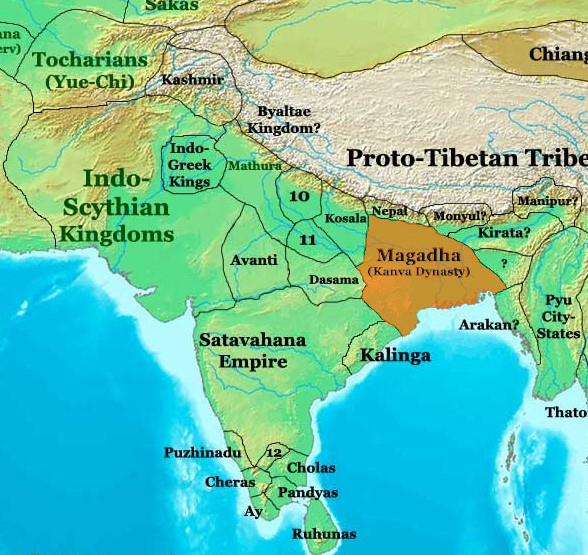
- Territorial expansion of Magadha-based rulers 6th century BCE onwards
- Capital: Rajagriha (Girivraj); Later, Pataliputra (modern-day Patna)
- Common languages: Sanskrit; Magadhi Prakrit; Ardhamagadhi Prakrit
- Religion: Brahmanism; Buddhism; Jainism
- Demonym: Māgadhī
- Magadha-based dynasties and empires
  - c. 544 – c. 413 BCE: Haryanka dynasty
  - c. 413 – c. 345 BCE: Shaishunaga dynasty
  - c. 345 – c. 321 BCE: Nanda dynasty
  - c. 321 – c. 185 BCE: Maurya Empire
  - c. 185 – c. 73 BCE: Shunga Empire
  - c. 73 – c. 28 BCE: Kanva dynasty
  - c. 1st cent. BCE – c. 2nd cent. BCE: Extraneous rule by Mitra dynasty (Kosambi)
  - c. 2nd – c. 3rd CE?: Extraneous rule by Kushan Empire
  - c. 240 – c. 579 CE: Gupta Empire
  - c. 6th – c. 8th cent. CE: Later Guptas
- Historical era: Iron Age
- Currency: Panas
Preceded by
Kikata kingdom
Succeeded by
Satavahana Empire
Kalinga (Mahameghavanas)
Vidarbha kingdom
- Today part of: India; Nepal; Pakistan; Bhutan; Afghanistan; Bangladesh

Empires of Magadha

Mahajanapada Period
Magadha among the 16 great ancient kingdoms.

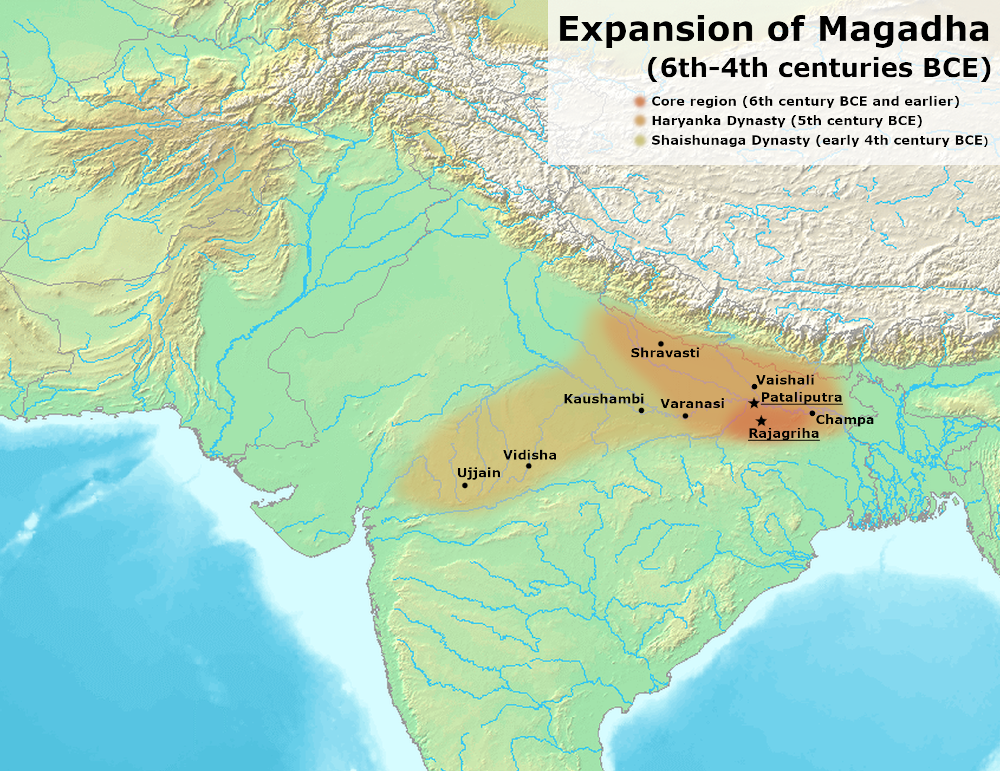

Haryanka Dynasty
Early territorial expansion under Bimbisara and Ajatashatru.

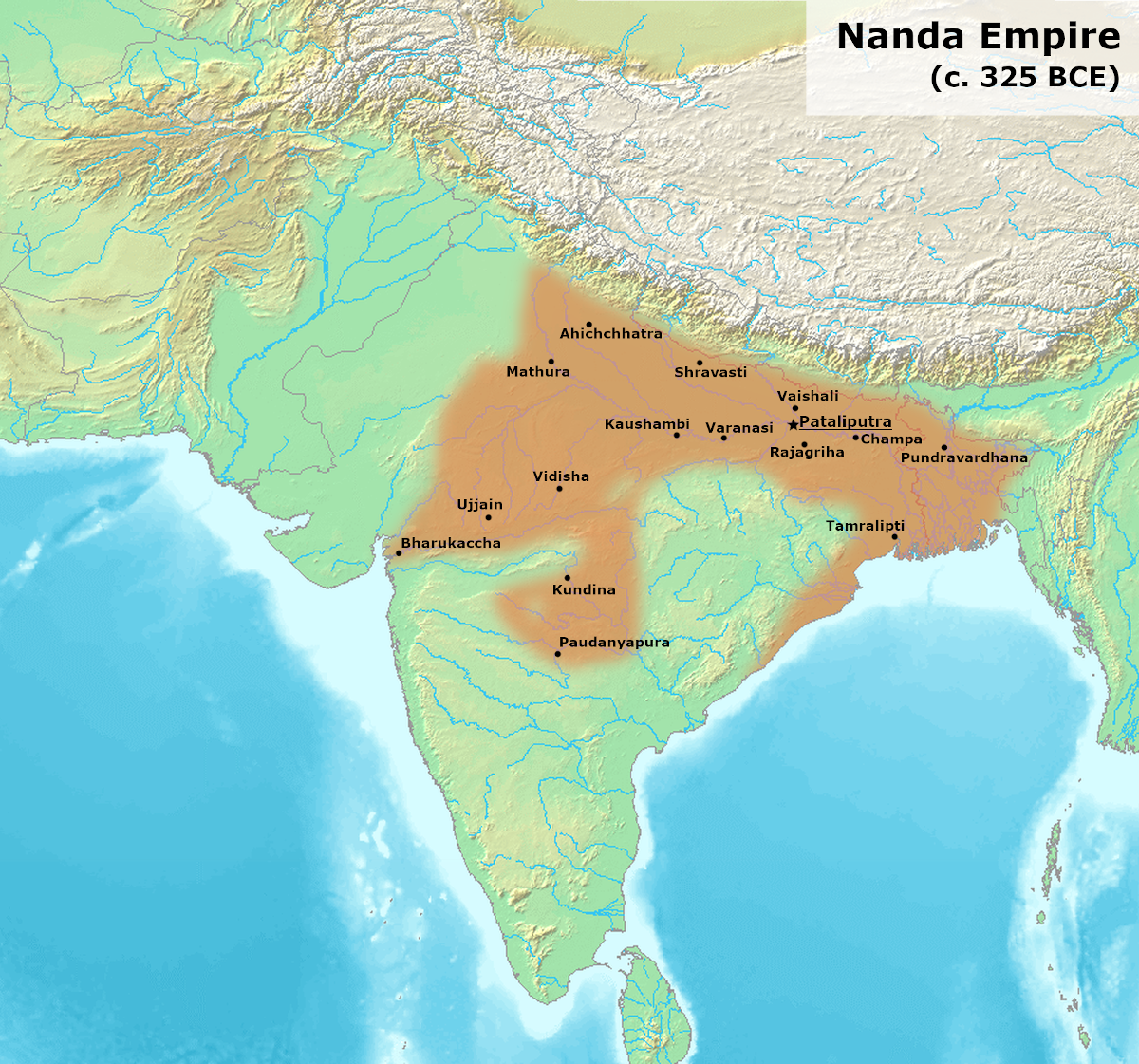

Nanda Empire
Magadha's dominance over Northern India.

Maurya Empire
Pan-Indian expansion originating from Pataliputra.

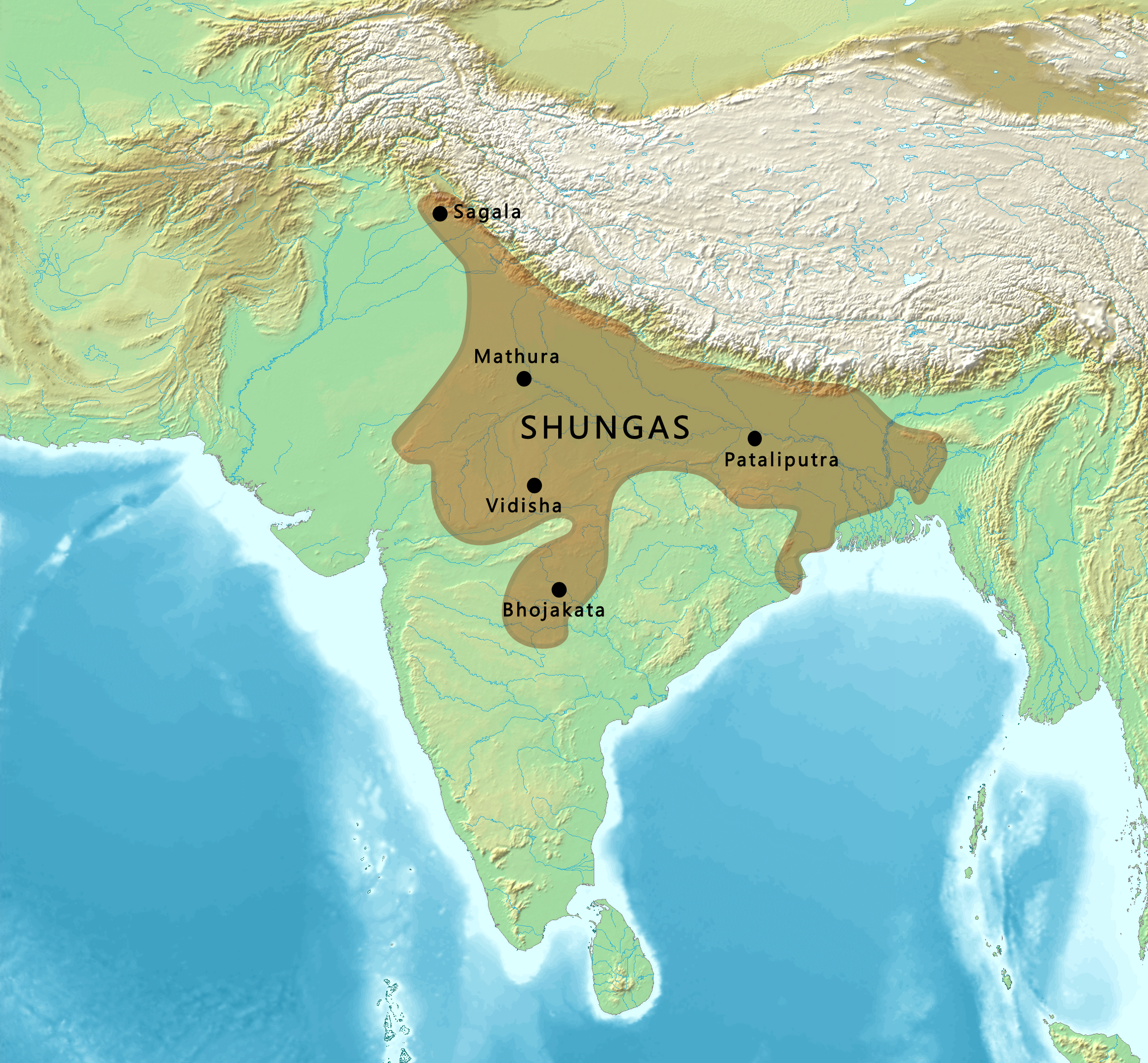

Shunga Empire
Post-Mauryan dynasty controlling central and eastern India.

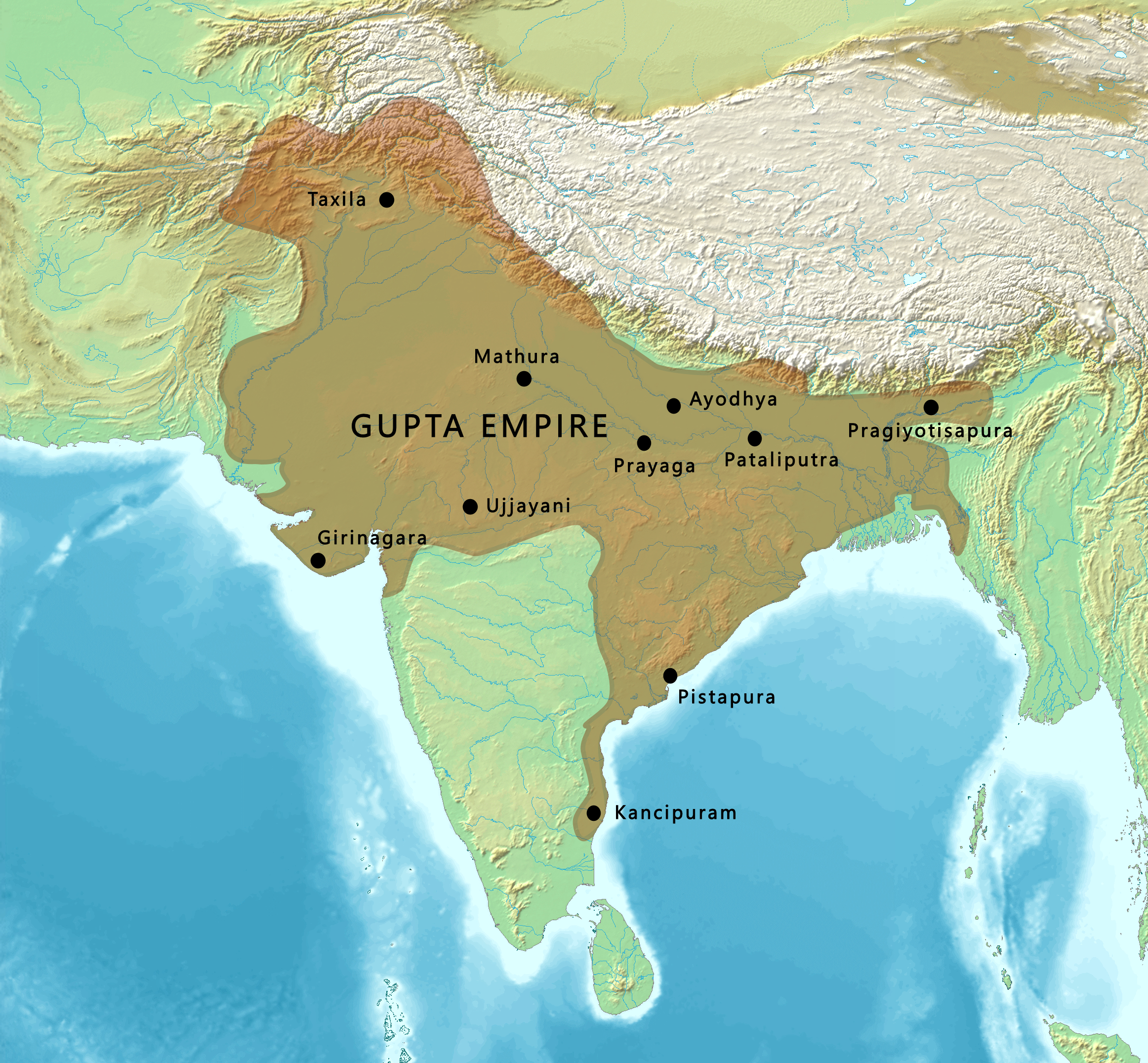

Gupta Empire
The Classical Age centered in Magadha.

Magadha (IPA: [məɡəd̪ʰaː]) was a region and kingdom in ancient India, based in the eastern Ganges Plain. It was one of the sixteen Mahajanapadas during the second urbanisation period. The region was ruled by several dynasties, which overshadowed, conquered, and incorporated the other Mahajanapadas. Magadha played an important role in the development of Jainism and Buddhism and formed the core of the Haryanka dynasty, Nanda Empire, Mauryan Empire, Shunga Empire and Gupta Empire.

== Geography ==
The territory of the Magadha kingdom proper before its expansion was bounded to the north, west, and east respectively by the Gaṅgā, Son, and Campā rivers, and the eastern spurs of the Vindhya mountains formed its southern border. The territory of the initial Magadha kingdom thus corresponded to the modern-day Patna and Gaya districts of the Indian state of Bihar.

The region of Greater Magadha also included neighbouring regions in the eastern Gangetic plains, and had a distinct culture and belief.

== History ==
=== Vedic period (ca. 1200 BCE-6th cent. BCE) ===
In the Atharvaveda (5.22) (ca. 1200-900 BCE) the Magadhas are listed along with the Angas, Gandharis and Mujavats as non-Vedic tribes located outside of the Kuru-Panchala cultural sphere.

==== Kikata kingdom ====
Some scholars have identified the Kīkaṭa tribe—mentioned in the Rigveda (3.53.14) with their ruler Pramaganda—as the forefathers of Magadhas because Kikata is used as synonym for Magadha in the later texts. Like the Magadhas in the Atharvaveda, the Rigveda speaks of the Kikatas as a hostile tribe, living on the borders of Brahmanical India, who did not perform Vedic rituals, but Witzel argues that it is "misplaced" to locate the Kikatas within Magadha, as in the Rigveda "their [Kikata] territory is clearly described as being to the south of Kurukshetra, in eastern Rajasthan or western Madhya Pradesh, and Magadha is beyond the geographical horizon of the Rigveda".

==== Brihadratha dynasty ====
According to the Puranas, the legendary Brihadratha dynasty was the first ruling dynasty of Magadha.

=== Mahajanapada (6th-4th cent. BCE) ===
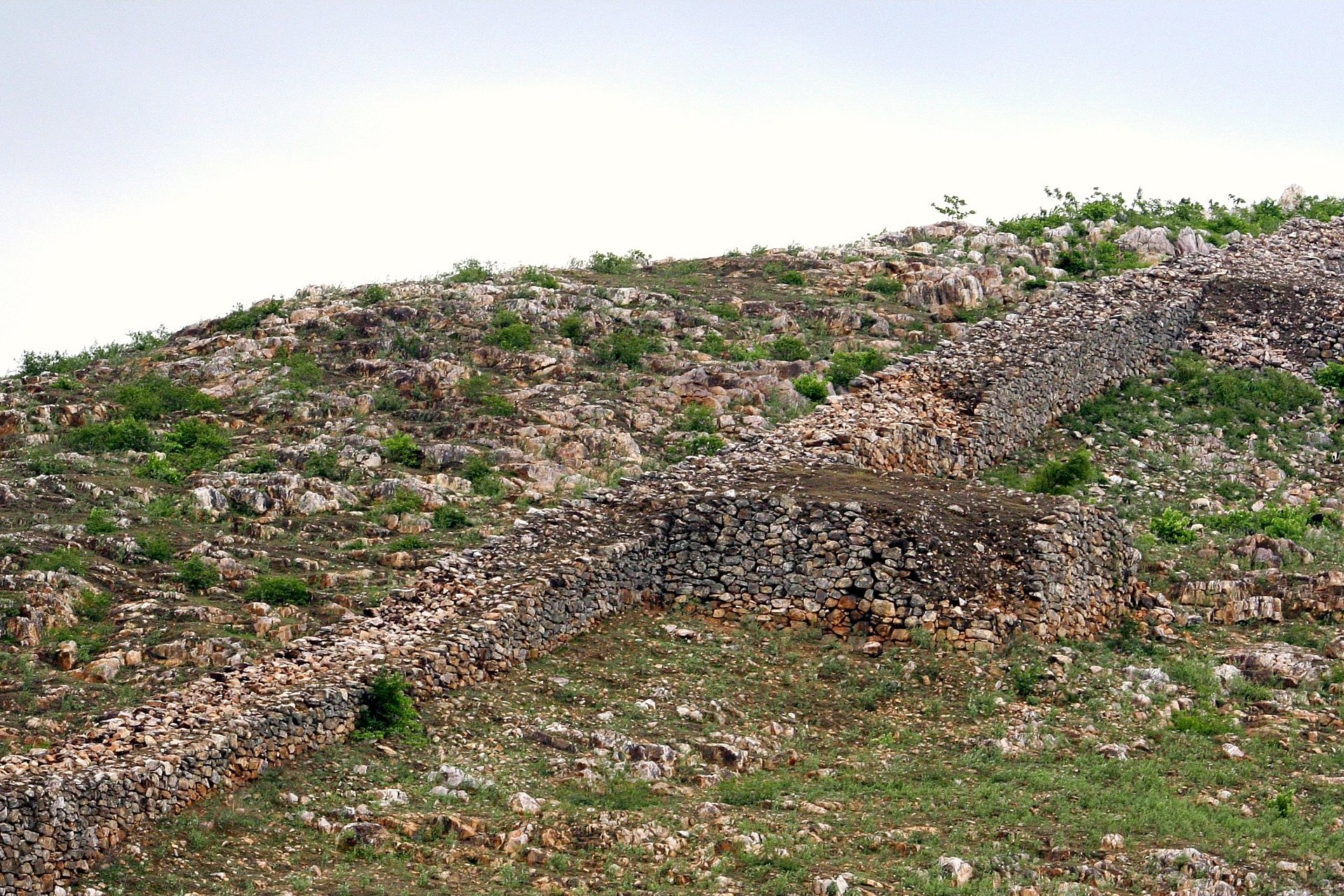
Cyclopean Wall of Rajgir which encircled the former capital of Magadha, Rajgir. Among the oldest pieces of cyclopean masonry in the world

==== Second urbanisation ====
Much of the Second Urbanisation took place in Greater Magadha from c. 500 BCE onwards, and it was here that Jainism and Buddhism arose.

==== Haryanka dynasty (544 BCE–413 BCE) ====
There is little certain information available on the early rulers of Magadha. The most important sources are the Buddhist Pāli Canon, the Jain Agamas and the Hindu Puranas. The ancient kingdom of Magadha is also mentioned in the Ramayana, the Mahabharata. Based on Jain and Buddhist sources, it appears that Magadha was ruled by the Haryanka dynasty for some 130 years, c. 543 to 413 BCE, although dates are uncertain, and could be significantly later.

Two notable Haryanka dynasty rulers of Magadha were Bimbisara (also known as Shrenika) and his son Ajatashatru (also known as Kunika), who are mentioned in Buddhist and Jain literature as contemporaries of the Buddha and Mahavira. Later, the throne of Magadha was usurped by Mahapadma Nanda, the founder of the Nanda Dynasty (c. 345 – c. 322 BCE), which conquered much of north India. The Nanda dynasty was overthrown by Chandragupta Maurya, the founder of the Maurya Empire (c. 322–185 BCE).

There is much uncertainty about the succession of kings and the precise chronology of Magadha prior to Mahapadma Nanda; the accounts of various ancient texts (all of which were written many centuries later than the era in question) contradict each other on many points. Furthermore, there is a "Long Chronology" and a contrasting "Short Chronology" preferred by some scholars, an issue that is inextricably linked to the uncertain chronology of the Buddha and Mahavira. According to historian K. T. S. Sarao, a proponent of the Short Chronology wherein the Buddha's lifespan was c.477–397 BCE, it can be estimated that Bimbisara was reigning c.457–405 BCE, and Ajatashatru was reigning c.405–373 BCE. According to historian John Keay, a proponent of the "Long Chronology," Bimbisara must have been reigning in the late 5th century BCE, and Ajatashatru in the early 4th century BCE. Keay states that there is great uncertainty about the royal succession after Ajatashatru's death, probably because there was a period of "court intrigues and murders," during which "evidently the throne changed hands frequently, perhaps with more than one incumbent claiming to occupy it at the same time" until Mahapadma Nanda was able to secure the throne.

The core of the kingdom was the area of Bihar south of the Ganges; its first capital was Rajagriha (modern day Rajgir), then Pataliputra (modern Patna). Rajagriha was initially known as 'Girivrijja' and later came to be known as so during the reign of Ajatashatru. Magadha expanded to include most of Bihar and Bengal with the conquest of Vajjika League and Anga, respectively.

=== Expansion ===
==== Shaishunaga dynasty (413 BCE–345 BCE) ====
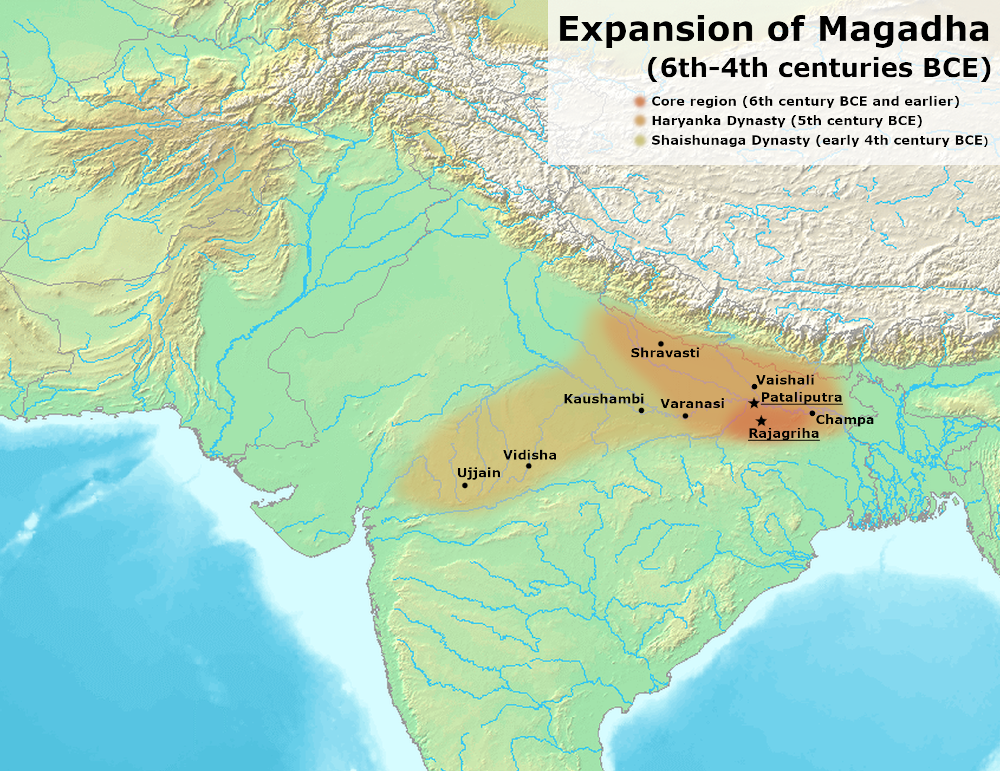
The approximate extent of the Haryanka dynasty and the Shaisunaga dynasty between the 6th and 5th century BCE.

=== Post-Gupta ===
==== Later Guptas (c. 6th century CE–c. 8th century CE) ====
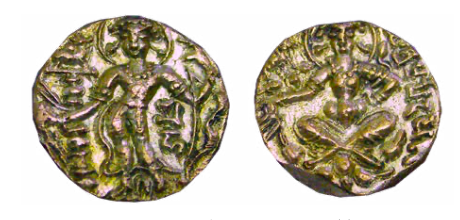
Archer type coinage of King Mahasenagupta of the Later Gupta dynasty, c. 6th century CE

The Later Gupta dynasty, also known as the Later Guptas of Magadha, were the rulers of the Magadha region and partly of Malwa from the 6th and 8th centuries CE. The Later Guptas emerged after the disintegration of the Imperial Guptas as the rulers of Magadha and Malwa however, there is no evidence to connect the two dynasties and the Later Guptas may have adopted the -gupta suffix to link themselves the Imperial Guptas.

==== Maukharis (c. 510 CE–c. 606 CE) ====
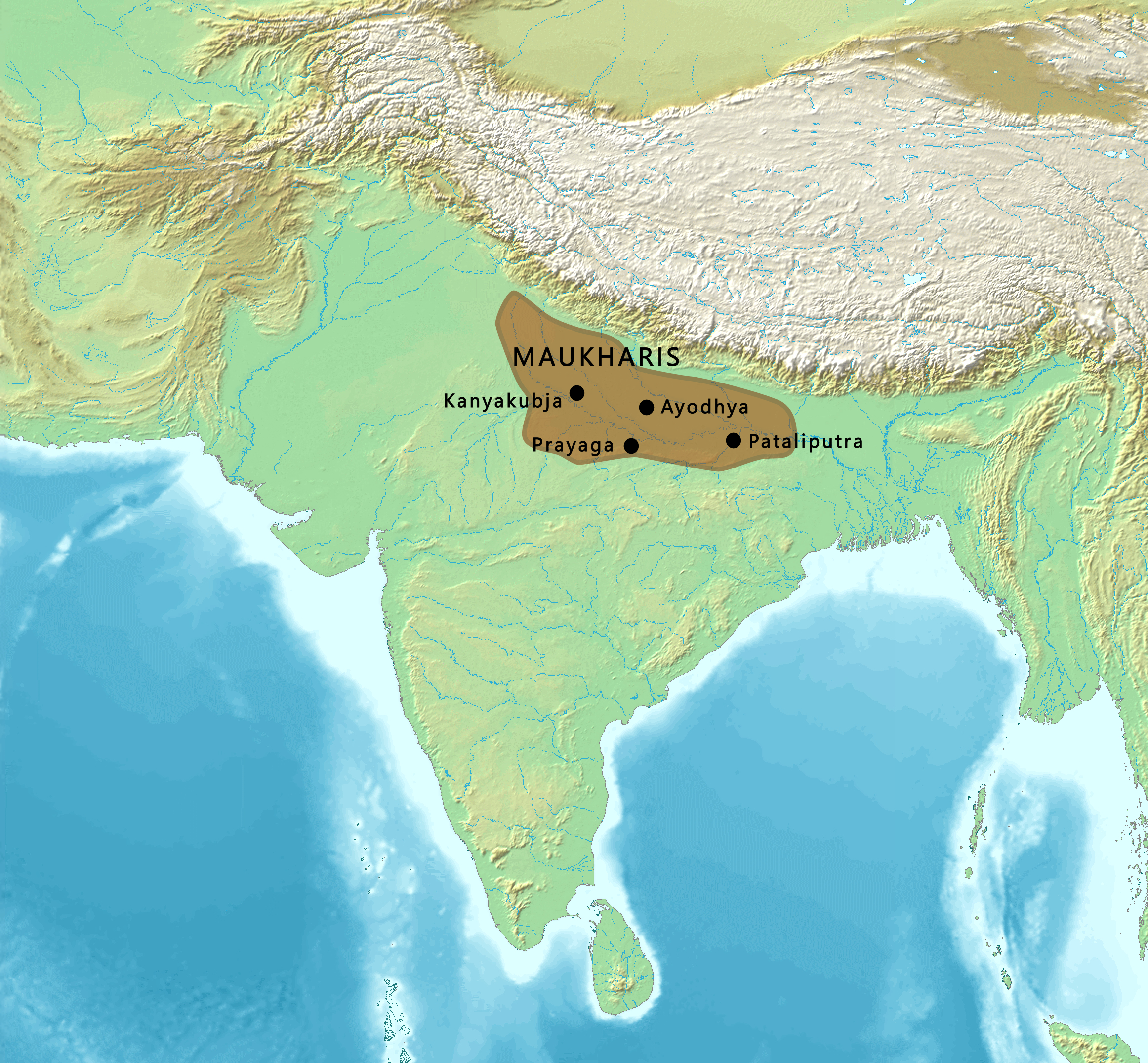
Map of the Maukharis of Kannauj

The initial branch of the Maukharis ruled from Gaya in Magadha before later moving to Kannauj. The Maukharis have been associated with the Magadha region since the Mauryan period. The earliest inscription of the Maukhari dynasty has been found in Gaya dating back to the third-century BCE on a clay seal and the Maukharis continued to have a recorded presence in Gaya until the 6th century CE.

Due to the events leading to the collapse of the Gupta Empire, Harivarman, the first Maukhari of Kannauj likely migrated westwards to carve out his own kingdom.

=== Late Medieval ===
From the 11th century until the late 13th century, a group of Buddhist kings known as the Pithipatis ruled parts of the Magadha region. These kings referred to themselves as Magadhādipati which translates to "Lords of Magadha".

== Buddhism and Jainism ==
Gautama Buddha, the founder of Buddhism, lived much of his life in the kingdom of Magadha. He attained enlightenment in Bodh Gaya, gave his first sermon in Sarnath and the first Buddhist council was held in Rajgriha.

Several Śramaṇic movements had existed before the 6th century BCE, and these influenced both the āstika and nāstika traditions of Indian philosophy. The Śramaṇa movement gave rise to diverse range of heterodox beliefs, ranging from accepting or denying the concept of soul, atomism, antinomian ethics, materialism, atheism, agnosticism, fatalism to free will, idealisation of extreme asceticism to that of family life, strict ahimsa (non-violence) and vegetarianism to the permissibility of violence and meat-eating. Magadha kingdom was the nerve centre of this revolution.

Jainism was revived and re-established after Mahavira, the last and the 24th Tirthankara, who synthesised and revived the philosophies and promulgations of the ancient Śramaṇic traditions laid down by the first Jain tirthankara Rishabhanatha millions of years ago. Buddha founded Buddhism which received royal patronage in the kingdom.

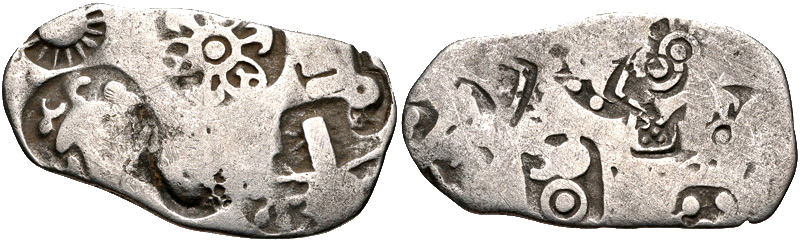
Magadha kingdom coin, c. 430–320 BCE, Karshapana

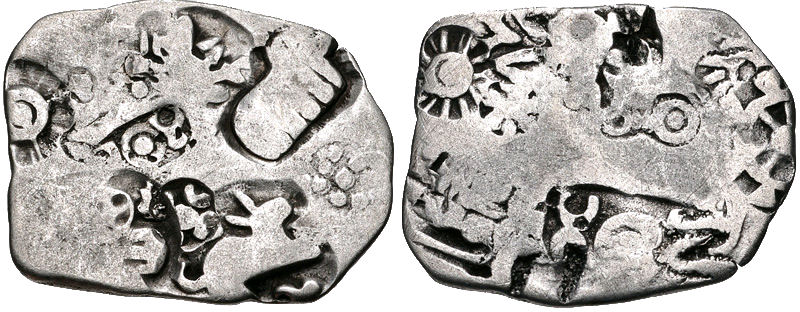
Magadha kingdom coin, c. 350 BCE, Karshapana

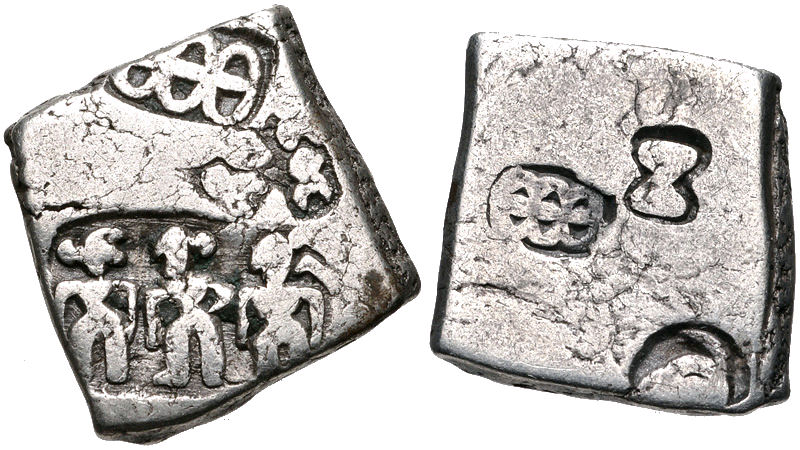
Chandragupta Maurya period Karshapana coin, circa 315-310 B.C.

According to Indologist Johannes Bronkhorst, the culture of Magadha was in fundamental ways different from the Vedic kingdoms of the Indo-Aryans. According to Bronkhorst, the śramana culture arose in "Greater Magadha," which was Indo-Aryan, but not Vedic. In this culture, Kshatriyas were placed higher than Brahmins, and it rejected Vedic authority and rituals. He argues for a cultural area termed "Greater Magadha", defined as roughly the geographical area in which the Buddha and Mahavira lived and taught.

With regard to the Buddha, this area stretched by and large from Śrāvastī, the capital of Kosala, in the north-west to Rājagṛha, the capital of Magadha, in the south-east". According to Bronkhorst, "there was indeed a culture of Greater Magadha which remained recognizably distinct from Vedic culture until the time of the grammarian Patañjali (ca. 150 BCE) and beyond". The Buddhologist Alexander Wynne writes that there is an "overwhelming amount of evidence" to suggest that this rival culture to the Vedic Aryans dominated the eastern Gangetic plain during the early Buddhist period. Orthodox Vedic Brahmins were, therefore, a minority in Magadha during this early period.

The Magadhan religions are termed the sramana traditions and include Jainism, Buddhism and Ājīvika. Buddhism and Jainism were the religions promoted by the early Magadhan kings, such as Srenika, Bimbisara and Ajatashatru, and the Nanda Dynasty (345–321 BCE) that followed was mostly Jain. These Sramana religions did not worship the Vedic deities, instead of practising some form of asceticism and meditation (jhana) and tending to construct round burial mounds (called stupas in Buddhism). These religions also sought some type of liberation from the cyclic rounds of rebirth and karmic retribution through spiritual knowledge.

=== Religious sites in Magadha ===
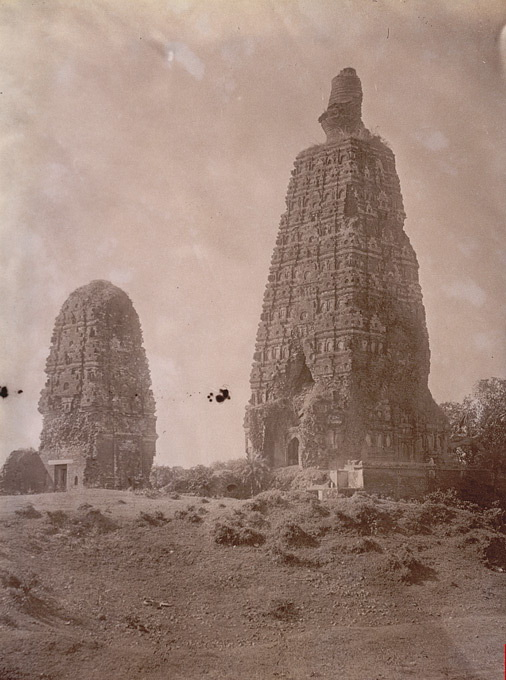
The ancient Mahabodhi Temple at Bodh Gaya prior to its restoration

Among the Buddhist sites currently found in the Magadha region include two UNESCO World Heritage Sites such as the Mahabodhi Temple at Bodh Gaya and the Nalanda monastery. The Mahabodhi Temple is one of the most important places of pilgrimage in the Buddhist world and is said to mark the site where the Buddha attained enlightenment.

== Language ==
Beginning in the Theravada commentaries, the Pali language has been identified with Magadhi, the language of the kingdom of Magadha, and this was taken to also be the language that the Buddha used during his life. In the 19th century, the British Orientalist Robert Caesar Childers argued that the true or geographical name of the Pali language was Magadhi Prakrit, and that because pāḷi means "line, row, series", the early Buddhists extended the meaning of the term to mean "a series of books", so pāḷibhāsā means "language of the texts". Nonetheless, Pali does retain some eastern features that have been referred to as Māgadhisms.

Magadhi Prakrit was one of the three dramatic prakrits to emerge following the decline of Sanskrit. It was spoken in Magadha and neighbouring regions and later evolved into modern eastern Indo-Aryan languages like Magahi, Maithili and Bhojpuri.

== Historical figures from Magadha ==
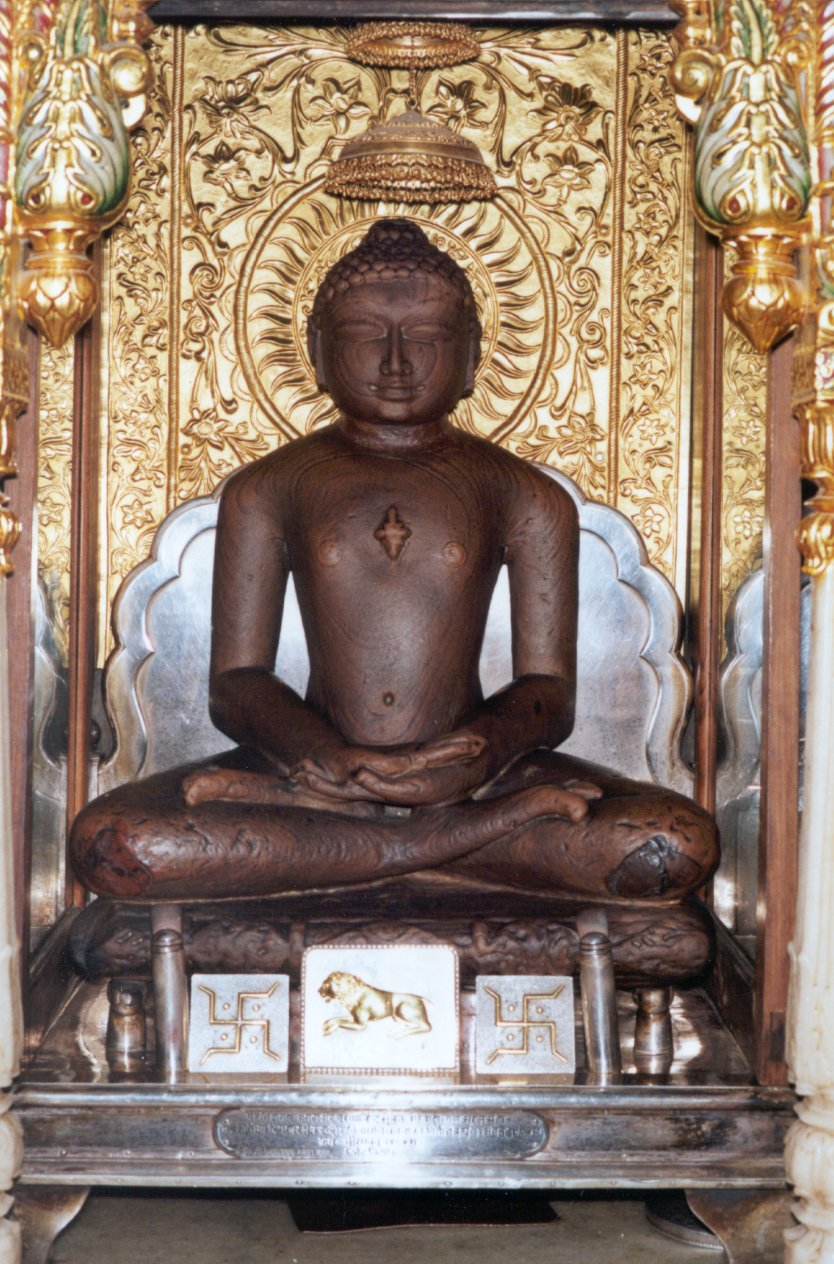
The 24th Tirthankara of Jainism, Mahavira, who was born in the Nāya republic near Magadha to a royal family

Important people from the region of Magadha include:

- Mahākāśyapa - one of the Buddha's principle disciples born in the 5th century BCE in Mahātittha village in Magadha
- Indrabhūti Gautama - a Brahmin born to Vasubhūti and in Gorbara village in Magadha. He is considered to be Mahavira's chief disciple, a ganadhara. His brothers, Agnibhūti and Vāyubhūti, were also ganadharas of Mahavira.
- Śāriputra – born to a wealthy Brahmin in a village located near Rājagaha in Magadha. He is considered the first of the Buddha's two chief male disciples, together with Maudgalyāyana.
- Maudgalyāyana – born in the village of Kolita in Magadha. He was one of the Buddha's two main disciples. In his youth, he was a spiritual wanderer before meeting the Buddha.
- Mahavira – the 24th Tirthankara of Jainism. Born into a royal kshatriya family in what is now Vaishali district of Bihar. He abandoned all worldly possessions at the age of 30 and became an ascetic. He is considered to be the successor of Pārśvanātha and a slightly older contemporary of the Buddha.
- Maitripada – an 11th-century Indian Buddhist Mahasiddha associated with the Mahāmudrā transmission. Born in the village of Jhatakarani in Magadha. Also associated with the monasteries of Nalanda and Vikramashila.
- Dhyānabhadra - 13th/14th century monk of Nalanda born to a minor chief in Magadha and later travelled across South and East Asia.
- Subhūticandra - 11/12th-century Indian Buddhist monk associated with Nalanda and Vikramashila who belonged to Magadha.

== See also ==
- Greater Magadha
- History of India
- Magadha–Vajji war
- Magadha–Anga war
- Avanti–Magadhan War
- List of monarchs of Magadha
- Timeline of Indian history
- Magahi culture
- Magahi language

Timeline and cultural period	Indus plain (Punjab-Sapta Sindhu-Gujarat)	Gangetic Plain			Central India	Southern India
Timeline and cultural period	Indus plain (Punjab-Sapta Sindhu-Gujarat)	Upper Gangetic Plain (Ganga-Yamuna doab)	Middle Gangetic Plain	Lower Gangetic Plain	Central India	Southern India
IRON AGE
Culture	Late Vedic Period	Late Vedic Period; Painted Grey Ware culture	Late Vedic Period; Northern Black Polished Ware		Pre-history	
6th century BCE	Gandhara	Kuru-Panchala	Magadha		Adivasi (tribes)	Assaka
Culture	Persian-Greek influences	"Second Urbanisation"; Rise of Shramana movements Jainism - Buddhism - Ājīvika - Yoga			Pre-history	
5th century BCE	(Persian conquests)		Shaishunaga dynasty		Adivasi (tribes)	Assaka
4th century BCE	(Greek conquests)	Nanda empire				
HISTORICAL AGE
Culture	Spread of Buddhism				Pre-history	
3rd century BCE	Maurya Empire					Satavahana dynasty Sangam period (300 BCE – 200 CE); Early Cholas; Early Pandyan kingdom Cheras
Culture	Preclassical Hinduism (Note: Michaels (2004) p.39) - "Hindu Synthesis" (Note: Hiltebeitel (2002)) (ca. 200 BCE - 300 CE) (Note: Michaels (2004) p.39) (Note: Hiltebeitel (2002)); Epics - Puranas - Ramayana - Mahabharata - Bhagavad Gita - Brahma Sutras - Smarta Tradition; Mahayana Buddhism					
2nd century BCE	Indo-Greek Kingdom		Shunga Empire; Maha-Meghavahana Dynasty			Satavahana dynasty Sangam period (300 BCE – 200 CE); Early Cholas; Early Pandyan kingdom Cheras
1st century BCE	Indo-Greek Kingdom		Shunga Empire; Maha-Meghavahana Dynasty			Satavahana dynasty Sangam period (300 BCE – 200 CE); Early Cholas; Early Pandyan kingdom Cheras
1st century CE	Indo-Scythians; Indo-Parthians		Kuninda Kingdom			Satavahana dynasty Sangam period (300 BCE – 200 CE); Early Cholas; Early Pandyan kingdom Cheras
2nd century	Kushan Empire					Satavahana dynasty Sangam period (300 BCE – 200 CE); Early Cholas; Early Pandyan kingdom Cheras
3rd century	Kushano-Sasanian Kingdom; Western Satraps	Kushan Empire		Kamarupa kingdom	Adivasi (tribes)	Satavahana dynasty Sangam period (300 BCE – 200 CE); Early Cholas; Early Pandyan kingdom Cheras
Culture	"Golden Age of Hinduism"(ca. CE 320-650) (Note: Michaels (2004) p.40); Puranas - Kural; Co-existence of Hinduism and Buddhism					
4th century	Kidarites	Gupta Empire; Varman dynasty				Andhra Ikshvakus; Kalabhra dynasty Kadamba Dynasty; Western Ganga Dynasty
5th century	Hephthalite Empire	Alchon Huns				Vishnukundina; Kalabhra dynasty
6th century	Nezak Huns; Kabul Shahi; Maitraka				Adivasi (tribes)	Vishnukundina; Badami Chalukyas; Kalabhra dynasty
Culture	Late-Classical Hinduism (ca. CE 650-1100) (Note: Michaels (2004) p.41); Advaita Vedanta - Tantra; Decline of Buddhism in India					
7th century	Indo-Sassanids		Vakataka dynasty Empire of Harsha	Mlechchha dynasty	Adivasi (tribes)	Badami Chalukyas; Eastern Chalukyas; Pandyan kingdom (revival); Pallava
7th century	Karkota dynasty				Adivasi (tribes)	
8th century	Kabul Shahi	Pala Empire			Adivasi (tribes)	Eastern Chalukyas; Pandyan kingdom Kalachuri
9th century	Gurjara-Pratihara				Adivasi (tribes)	Rashtrakuta Empire; Eastern Chalukyas; Pandyan kingdom Medieval Cholas; Chera Perumals of Makkotai
10th century	Ghaznavids			Pala dynasty Kamboja-Pala dynasty	Adivasi (tribes)	Kalyani Chalukyas; Eastern Chalukyas; Medieval Cholas; Chera Perumals of Makkotai; Rashtrakuta
References and sources for table References Sources: Flood, Gavin D. (1996), An Introduction to Hinduism, Cambridge University Press; Hiltebeitel, Alf (2002), Hinduism. In: Joseph Kitagawa, "The Religious Traditions of Asia: Religion, History, and Culture", Routledge; Michaels, Axel (2004), Hinduism. Past and present, Princeton, New Jersey: Princeton University Press
