= Anga Lipi =

Historical writing system

- Direction: Left-to-right

Anga Lipi (𑂃𑂁𑂏) was a historical writing system. The Anga Lipi finds its mention in the Buddhist text "Lalitvistar" which says Anga lipi was among the 64 scripts known to Lord Buddha.

== Etymology and history ==
The Anga Script is mentioned in an ancient Sanskrit language Buddhist book, the Lalitavistara, which names Anga Lipi relatively early in the list of 64 scripts known to the Buddha. Arthur Coke Burnell thought that some of the sixty-four scripts mentioned in the Lalitavistara were mythical, but he considered some, including Dravid, Anga and Banga, to be real, though not appearing as distinct alphabets until the 9th or 10th century CE. (Burnell regarded this passage as a late interpolation.)

== Characteristics and comparison ==
Anga Lipi and Bengali script might have been derived from Brahmic, with some regional characteristics. This supports the belief that the development of local characteristics in alphabets was continuing from earlier times.

It reflects the early development of local variants of Indian alphabets.

== See also ==
- Brahmic family of scripts
- Brāhmī script
- Bengali-Assamese script
- Kaithi
- Abugida
- List of writing systems
- List of languages by first written accounts
- Angika
- Middle Indo-Aryan languages
- Anga Region
