= Champasak =

Champasak may refer to these in Laos:

- Champasak province, a province in southwestern Laos
- Champasak (town)
- Champasak F.C., former name of SHB Vientiane F.C.
- Kingdom of Champasak
- Na Champassak family

== See also ==
- Champa (disambiguation)
