= Champa, Madhubani =

Village in Bihar, India

Champa is a village in the Madhubani district of Bihar State, India.

== Geography ==
Nearby villages are Bhagwanpur to the west, Malmal to the east, Naraila to the north, and Ramnagar to west.

== Economy ==
Despite having agricultural land, opportunities or resources are limited. Most residents are migrate to urban areas such as Delhi, Mumbai and Kolkata. The primary income for the village comes from these urban migrants. Many villagers live below the poverty line, resulting in and inadequate living standard.

== Religion and caste ==
All the people of the village are Hindus. Various castes including Yadav, Brahman, Kiyot Dhobi live there.

== Education ==
- Middle School Champa

== Electoral constituency ==
The electoral constituency Benipatti vidhan Sabha madhubani
