= List of Hindi films of 2013 =

2013 marked the completion of 100 years of Bollywood. It witnessed the release of multiple big-budget films in Bollywood including a number of sequels and quasi-sequels lined up. Some of the notable sequels were: Aashiqui 2, Dhoom 3, Grand Masti, Krrish 3, Murder 3, Once Upon a Time in Mumbaai 2, Race 2, Saheb, Biwi Aur Gangster Returns, Satya 2, Shootout at Wadala and Yamla Pagla Deewana 2.

== Box office collection ==
No.	Title	Distributor	Worldwide gross
1	Dhoom 3	Yash Raj Films	₹589.02 crore (US$100.52 million)
2	Chennai Express	UTV Motion Pictures; Red Chillies Entertainment	₹423.76 crore (US$72.32 million)
3	Krrish 3	Filmkraft Productions	₹393.37 crore (US$67.13 million)
4	Yeh Jawaani Hai Deewani	UTV Motion Pictures; Dharma Productions	₹319.01 crore (US$54.44 million)
5	Aashiqui 2	T-Series Films; Vishesh Films	₹250 crore (US$42.66 million)
6	Goliyon Ki Raasleela Ram-Leela	Eros International; Bhansali Productions	₹220.58 crore (US$37.64 million)
7	Vishwaroopam	Raaj Kamal Films International	₹220 crore (US$37.54 million)
8	Bhaag Milkha Bhaag	Viacom 18 Motion Pictures; ROMP Pictures	₹200 crore (US$34.13 million)
9	Race 2	UTV Motion Pictures; Tips Industries	₹175.75 crore (US$29.99 million)
10	Grand Masti	Eros International; Maruti International	₹148.23 crore (US$25.3 million)

== January – March ==
Opening		Title	Director	Cast	Genre	Studio	Source
J A N	4	Table No. 21	Aditya Datt	Paresh Rawal, Rajeev Khandelwal, Tina Desai	Thriller/drama	Eros International, Next Gen Films	
J A N	4	Dehraadun Diary	Milind Ukey	Adhyayan Suman, Rohit Bakshi, Ragini Nandwani, Ashwini Kalsekar, Rati Agnihotri	Thriller		
J A N	4	Meri Shadi Karao	Syed Noor	Gurdeep Singh Mehndi	Comedy		
J A N	11	Matru Ki Bijlee Ka Mandola	Vishal Bhardwaj	Imran Khan, Anushka Sharma, Pankaj Kapur	Comedy	Fox Star Studios, VB Pictures	
J A N	11	Pyaar Mein Aisa Hota Hai	Rajesh Kumar	Mohd Nazim, Aanamika Bawa, Rohit Rajawat, Aayushi Sharma	Thriller		
J A N	11	Gangoobai	Priya Krishnaswamy	Sarita Joshi, Purab Kohli, Mita Vasisht	Drama		
J A N	18	Inkaar	Sudhir Mishra	Arjun Rampal, Chitrangada Singh, Deepti Naval, Kanwaljit Singh	Romance/crime	Viacom18 Motion Pictures, Tipping Point Films	
J A N	18	Mumbai Mirror	Ankush Bhatt	Sachiin Joshi, Gihana Khan, Prakash Raj	Action		
J A N	18	Bandook	Aditya Om	Aditya Om, Manisha Kelkar, Arshad Khan	Crime		
J A N	25	Race 2	Abbas–Mustan	Saif Ali Khan, Jacqueline Fernandez, John Abraham, Deepika Padukone, Anil Kapoor, Ameesha Patel	Action/thriller	UTV Motion Pictures, Tips Industries	
J A N	25	Akaash Vani	Luv Ranjan	Kartik Tiwari, Nushrat Bharucha	Romance	Wide Frame Pictures	
J A N	25	Main Krishna Hoon	Rajiv S. Ruia	Hrithik Roshan, Juhi Chawla, Rajneesh Duggal, Misti Mukherjee, Katrina Kaif	Animation/musical	Eros International, Fact Enterprises, JC Film Vision	
F E B	1	Deewana Main Deewana	K.C. Bokadia	Govinda, Priyanka Chopra	Romantic thriller/comedy film		
F E B	1	David	Bejoy Nambiar	Vikram, Lara Dutta, Vinay Virmani, Neil Nitin Mukesh, Tabu	Crime	Reliance Entertainment, Getaway Pictures	
F E B	1	Vishwaroopam	Kamal Haasan	Kamal Haasan, Pooja Kumar, Shekhar Kapur, Andrea Jeremiah, Rahul Bose	Action	Raaj Kamal Films International	
F E B	1	Mai...	Mahesh Kodiyal	Asha Bhosle, Ram Kapoor, Padmini Kolhapure	Drama/family		
F E B	1	Listen... Amaya	Avinash Kumar Singh	Farooq Sheikh, Deepti Naval, Swara Bhaskar	Drama		
F E B	8	Special 26	Neeraj Pandey	Akshay Kumar, Kajal Aggarwal, Manoj Bajpayee, Anupam Kher, Jimmy Sheirgill	Drama/heist	Viacom18 Motion Pictures, Wide Frame Pictures, Friday Filmworks	
F E B	8	ABCD: Any Body Can Dance	Remo D'Souza	Prabhu Deva, Ganesh Acharya, Kay Kay Menon, Lauren Gottlieb, Punit Pathak, Dharmesh Yelande, Salman Yusuff Khan	Drama/dance	UTV Spotboy	
F E B	8	The Unsound	Alok Shrivastava	Shadaab Khan, Anurita Jha	Thriller		
F E B	15	Jayantabhai Ki Luv Story	Vinnil Markan	Vivek Oberoi, Neha Sharma	Comedy/romance		
F E B	15	Murder 3	Vishesh Bhatt	Randeep Hooda, Aditi Rao Hydari, Sara Loren	Thriller	Fox Star Studios, Vishesh Films	
F E B	22	Kai Po Che!	Abhishek Kapoor	Sushant Singh Rajput, Rajkumar Rao, Amit Sadh, Amrita Puri	Drama	UTV Motion Pictures	
F E B	22	Zila Ghaziabad	Anand Kumar	Arshad Warsi, Vivek Oberoi, Sanjay Dutt, Minissha Lamba, Ravi Kishan, Paresh Rawal	Action		
M A R	1	I, Me Aur Main	Kapil Sharma	John Abraham, Prachi Desai, Chitrangda Singh	Romance/comedy	Reliance Entertainment, Rose Movies	
M A R	1	Bloody Isshq	Arup Dutta	Akash Singh, Shilpa Anand, Tripta Parashar	Romance/thriller		
M A R	1	The Attacks of 26/11	Ram Gopal Varma	Nana Patekar	Action/thriller/docudrama	Eros International, Alumbra Entertainment	
M A R	8	Saheb, Biwi Aur Gangster Returns	Tigmanshu Dhulia	Jimmy Sheirgill, Mahie Gill, Irrfan Khan, Soha Ali Khan	Drama/thriller	Viacom18 Motion Pictures, BrandSmith Motion Pictures, Moving Pictures, Tigmanshu Dhulia Films	
M A R	8	Saare Jahaan Se Mehnga	Anshul Sharma	Sanjay Mishra, Ranjan Chhabra, Disha Pandey, Vishwa Mohan Badola, Pramod Pathak, Zakir Hussain	Satire/comedy		
M A R	15	3G - A Killer Connection	Shantanu, Sheershak Anand	Neil Nitin Mukesh, Sonal Chauhan	Romance/thriller	Eros International, Next Gen Films	
M A R	15	Asab Bosana Mera Story Hai	Shoresa Khan, Herisa Sharma	Arjun Mathur, Gabriela Bertante	Comedy/sports		
M A R	15	Mere Dad Ki Maruti	Ashima Chibber	Saqib Saleem, Ram Kapoor, Rhea Chakraborty, Prabal Panjabi	Comedy		
M A R	15	Jolly LLB	Subhash Kapoor	Arshad Warsi, Amrita Rao, Boman Irani, Saurabh Shukla	Comedy/satire	Fox Star Studios	
M A R	21	Rangrezz	Priyadarshan	Jackky Bhagnani, Priya Anand, Rajpal Yadav, Evelyn Sharma	Action	Pooja Entertainment	
M A R	22	The Adventures of Sinbad	Shinjan Neogi, Abhishek Panchal	Vaibhav, Manju	Adventure		
M A R	22	Sona Spa					
M A R	29	Himmatwala	Sajid Khan	Ajay Devgn, Tamannaah, Mahesh Manjrekar, Riteish Deshmukh	Action/comedy	UTV Motion Pictures, Pooja Entertainment	

== April – June ==
Opening		Title	Director	Cast	Genre	Studio	Source
A P R	5	Chashme Baddoor	David Dhawan	Ali Zafar, Siddharth, Taapsee Pannu, Divyendu Sharma	Comedy/romance	Viacom18 Motion Pictures	
A P R	12	Nautanki Saala	Rohan Sippy	Ayushmann Khurrana, Kunaal Roy Kapur, Pooja Salvi, Evelyn Sharma	Comedy/romance	T-Series Films, Ramesh Sippy Entertainment	
A P R	12	Commando: A One Man Army	Dilip Ghosh	Vidyut Jamwal, Pooja Chopra, Jaideep Ahlawat	Action/romance	Reliance Entertainment, Sunshine Pictures	
A P R	19	Ek Thi Daayan	Kannan Iyer	Emraan Hashmi, Huma Qureshi, Konkona Sen Sharma, Kalki Koechlin	Horror	Balaji Motion Pictures, ALT Entertainment, VB Pictures	
A P R	26	Aashiqui 2	Mohit Suri	Aditya Roy Kapur, Shraddha Kapoor, Shaad Randhawa	Musical/romance	T-Series Films, Vishesh Films	
A P R	26	Shree	Rajesh Bachchani	Hussain Kuwajerwala, Paresh Ganatra, Anjali Patil	Thriller		
M A Y	3	Shootout at Wadala	Sanjay Gupta	John Abraham, Anil Kapoor, Kangana Ranaut, Manoj Bajpayee, Sonu Sood, Tushar Kapoor, Ronit Roy, Mahesh Manjrekar, Karan Patel, Jackie Shroff, Raju Kher	Crime/thriller	Balaji Motion Pictures, White Feather Films	
M A Y	3	Bombay Talkies	Anurag Kashyap, Karan Johar, Zoya Akhtar, Dibakar Banerjee	Rani Mukerji, Nawazuddin Siddiqui, Randeep Hooda, Saqib Saleem, Sadashiv Amrapurkar, Katrina Kaif	Anthology	Viacom18 Motion Pictures, Flying Unicorn Entertainment, Dharma Productions, DBP, Excel Entertainment, AKFPL, Sikhya Entertainment	
M A Y	3	Chhota Bheem and the Throne of Bali	Rajiv Chilaka		Children/animation	Green Gold Animation	
M A Y	10	Go Goa Gone	Raj Nidimoru, Krishna D.K.	Saif Ali Khan, Kunal Khemu, Vir Das, Puja Gupta	Zombie comedy	Eros International, Illuminati Films, d2r Films	
M A Y	10	Gippi	Sonam Nair	Riya Vij, Divya Dutta, Taaha Shah	Coming of age	UTV Motion Pictures, Dharma Productions	
M A Y	17	Aurangzeb	Atul Sabharwal	Arjun Kapoor, Prithviraj Sukumaran, Jackie Shroff, Rishi Kapoor, Sasha Agha	Drama/action	Yash Raj Films	
M A Y	17	I Don't Luv U	Amit Kasaria	Ruslaan Mumtaz, Chetna Pande	Romantic drama		
M A Y	17	Beehad - The Ravines	Krishna Mishra	Vikas Shrivastav, Maan Singh Deep, Mangal Singh, Deepa	Drama		
M A Y	24	Ishkq in Paris	Prem Raj	Preity Zinta, Rhehan Malliek, Isabelle Adjani	Romance		
M A Y	24	Hum Hai Raahi Car Ke	Jyotin Goel	Adah Sharma, Dev Goel, Sanjay Dutt, Juhi Chawla, Chunky Pandey	Romantic comedy		
M A Y	24	Zindagi 50-50	Rajiv S. Ruia	Riya Sen, Rajan Verma, Veena Malik, Arya Babbar, Supriya Kumari, Rajpal Yadav	Adult/social		
M A Y	31	Yeh Jawaani Hai Deewani	Ayan Mukerji	Ranbir Kapoor, Deepika Padukone, Aditya Roy Kapur, Kalki Koechlin, Evelyn Sharma, Kunal Roy Kapoor, Madhuri Dixit	Romantic comedy	UTV Motion Pictures, Dharma Productions	
J U N	7	Yamla Pagla Deewana 2	Sangeeth Sivan	Dharmendra, Sunny Deol, Bobby Deol, Neha Sharma, Kristina Akheeva	Comedy/action	Sunny Sounds, Stellar Films	
J U N	7	Mere Haule Dost	Nitin Raghunath	Anirudh Loka, Raghuvardhan Garlapati, Aadil Abedi			
J U N	14	Fukrey	Mrigdeep Singh Lamba	Pulkit Samrat, Manjot Singh, Ali Fazal, Richa Chadda, Vishakha Singh, Priya Anand, Pankaj Tripathi	Comedy/thriller	Excel Entertainment	
J U N	14	Ankur Arora Murder Case	Suhail Tatari	Kay Kay Menon, Paoli Dam, Arjun Mathur, Vishakha Singh, Harsh Chhaya	Thriller		
J U N	21	Raanjhanaa	Anand L. Rai	Dhanush, Sonam Kapoor, Abhay Deol, Swara Bhaskar, Mohammed Zeeshan Ayyub	Romance	Eros International, Colour Yellow Productions	
J U N	21	Enemmy	Ashu Trikha	Mithun Chakraborty, Sunil Shetty, Mahakshay Chakraborty, Kay Kay Menon, Johnny Lever, Mahesh Manjrekar, Yuvika Chaudhary	Action		
J U N	21	Shortcut Romeo	Susi Ganeshan	Neil Nitin Mukesh, Ameesha Patel, Puja Gupta	Romantic thriller		
J U N	21	Hai Golmaal In White House	Salar Sheikh	Rajpal Yadav, Govind Namdeo, Pratima Kazmi	Comedy/drama		
J U N	28	Ghanchakkar	Rajkumar Gupta	Emraan Hashmi, Vidya Balan, Rajesh Sharma	Comedy/thriller	UTV Motion Pictures	

== July – September ==
Opening		Title	Director	Cast	Genre	Studio	Source
J U L	5	Lootera	Vikramaditya Motwane	Ranveer Singh, Sonakshi Sinha	Romance, thriller	Balaji Motion Pictures, Phantom Films	
J U L	5	Policegiri	K. S. Ravikumar	Sanjay Dutt, Prakash Raj, Om Puri, Prachi Desai	Action		
J U L	12	Bhaag Milkha Bhaag	Rakeysh Omprakash Mehra	Farhan Akhtar, Sonam Kapoor, Divya Dutta, Pawan Malhotra	Biographical	Viacom18 Motion Pictures, ROMP Pictures	
J U L	12	Sixteen	Raj Purohit	Izabelle Leite, Darshan Jariwala, Wamiqa Gabbi, Highphill Mathew, Rohan Mehra	Drama		
J U L	12	Boyss Toh Boyss Hain	Amit Vats	Raj Kumar Yadav, Anshuman Jha, Divya Dutta, Sharat Saxena, Dhruv Ganesh, Aarya Kumar	Comedy		
J U L	12	Shorts	Shlok Sharma, Siddharth Gupt, Anirban Roy, Rohit Pandey, Neeraj Ghaywan	Nawazuddin Siddiqui, Huma Qureshi, Richa Chadda, Vineet Kumar Singh	Anthology	PVR Pictures, AKFPL, Tumbhi, The Globe Hunters, Open Cafe Productions Flms, Lemon Tree Films, Om Cine Arts	
J U L	19	Ramaiya Vastavaiya	Prabhudeva	Girish Kumar, Shruti Haasan	Rom-com	Tips Industries	
J U L	19	D Day	Nikhil Advani	Arjun Rampal, Rishi Kapoor, Shruti Haasan, Irrfan Khan, Huma Qureshi	Action, drama	Wave Cinemas, Essel Vision Productions, Dar Motion Pictures, Emmay Entertainment	
J U L	19	Ship of Theseus	Anand Gandhi	Aida Al-Khashef, Niraj Kabi, Sohum Shah, Vinay Shukla	Experimental	Fortissimo Films, UTV Motion Pictures, Recyclewala Films	
J U L	26	Issaq	Manish Tiwary	Prateik Babbar, Amyra Dastur, Rajeshwari Sachdev, Evelyn Sharma, Ravi Kishan, Makarand Deshpande	Romance, drama	Pen Studios, Parmahans Creations, Dhaval Gada Productions	
J U L	26	Bajatey Raho	Shashant Shah	Vinay Pathak, Ranvir Shorey, Ravi Kishan, Dolly Ahluwalia	Comedy	Eros International, MSM Motion Pictures	
J U L	26	Luv U Soniyo	Joe Rajan	Tanuj Virwani, Neha Hinge	Romance	Viacom18 Motion Pictures, Tipping Point Films, 52 Weeks Entertainment, Odyssey Corporation, Harvey India Productions	
J U L	26	Nasha	Amit Saxena	Poonam Pandey, Shivam, Ranbir Chakma	Erotic, thriller		
A U G	2	Rabba Main Kya Karoon	Amrit Sagar Chopra	Arshad Warsi, Akash Chopra, Paresh Rawal	Comedy		
A U G	2	Chor Chor Super Chor	K. Rajesh	Deepak Dobriyal, Anshul Kataria, Priya Bathija, Paru Uma	Comedy		
A U G	2	B.A. Pass	Ajay Bahl	Shilpa Shukla, Shadab Kamal, Rajesh Sharma	Drama		
A U G	2	Calapor	Dinesh P. Bhonsle	Rituparna Sengupta, Priyanshu Chatterjee, Raghubir Yadav, Harsh Chhaya	Thriller, drama		
A U G	2	Love in Bombay	Joy Mukherjee	Joy Mukherjee, Waheeda Rehman, Kishore Kumar, Ashok Kumar, Rehman	Romance		
A U G	9	Chennai Express	Rohit Shetty	Shah Rukh Khan, Deepika Padukone	Comedy, action	UTV Motion Pictures, Red Chillies Entertainment	
A U G	15	Once Upon ay Time in Mumbai Dobaara!	Milan Luthria	Akshay Kumar, Imran Khan, Sonakshi Sinha, Sonali Bendre, Mahesh Manjrekar	Crime, romance	Balaji Motion Pictures	
A U G	23	Madras Cafe	Shoojit Sircar	John Abraham, Nargis Fakhri, Raashii Khanna	Drama, spy	Viacom18 Motion Pictures, JA Entertainment, Rising Sun Films	
A U G	30	Satyagraha	Prakash Jha	Amitabh Bachchan, Ajay Devgn, Kareena Kapoor, Arjun Rampal, Amrita Rao, Manoj Bajpai	Political thriller	UTV Motion Pictures, Prakash Jha Productions	
S E P	6	Zanjeer	Apoorva Lakhia	Ram Charan, Priyanka Chopra, Sanjay Dutt, Mahie Gill, Prakash Raj, Atul Kulkarni	Action, thriller	Reliance Entertainment, Prakash Mehra Productions, Flying Turtle Films, Rampage Motion Pictures	
S E P	6	Shuddh Desi Romance	Maneesh Sharma	Sushant Singh Rajput, Parineeti Chopra, Vaani Kapoor, Rishi Kapoor	Romance	Yash Raj Films	
S E P	6	Zindagi Jalebi	Karan Kashyap	Avinash Bhargava, Leena, Samarth Chaturvedi	Comedy		
S E P	10	Siddharth	Richie Mehta	Rajesh Tailang	Drama	Zeitgeist Films, Pinnacle Films, Poor Man's Productions, Wonderland India	
S E P	13	Grand Masti	Indra Kumar	Riteish Deshmukh, Vivek Oberoi, Aftab Shivdasani, Karishma Tanna, Manjari Fadnis, Bruna Abdullah, Kainaat Arora	Adult comedy	Eros International, Maruti International	
S E P	13	John Day	Ahishor Solomon	Naseeruddin Shah, Randeep Hooda	Thriller		
S E P	13	Horror Story	Ayush Raina	Karan Kundra, Nishant Singh Malkani, Ravish Desai, Hasan Zaidi, Sheetal Singh, Aparna Bajpai, Radhika Menon, Nandini Vaid	Horror		
S E P	20	Phata Poster Nikhla Hero	Rajkumar Santoshi	Shahid Kapoor, Ileana D'Cruz, Parul Yadav, Padmini Kolhapure, Darshan Jariwala	Rom com, action	Tips Industries	
S E P	20	The Lunchbox	Ritesh Batra	Irrfan Khan, Nawazuddin Siddiqui, Bharati Achrekar	Drama	Sony Pictures Classics, UTV Motion Pictures, Dharma Productions, DAR Motion Pictures, NFDC, Essel Vision Productions, Sikhya Entertainment, AKFPL, The Match Factory, Rohfilm, ASAP Films	
S E P	27	Warning	Gurmmeet Singh	Santosh Barmola, Suzana Rodrigues, Manjari Fadnis, Varun Sharma, Jitin Gulati, Sumit Suri, Madhurima Tuli	Thriller	Eros International, Alumbra Entertainment, Benaras Media Works	
S E P	27	Maazii	Jaideep Chopra	Sumeet Nijhawan, Mona Wasu, Pankaj Tripathi, Mohd. Zeeshan Ayyub, Manish Chaudhary	Suspense thriller		
S E P	27	Prague	Ashish R Shukla	Chandan Roy Sanyal, Elena Kazan, Arfi Lamba, Kumar Mayank	Psychological thriller, romance		
S E P	27	Super Model	Navin Batra	Veena Malik, Ashmit Patel, Jackie Shroff	Drama		

== October – December ==
Opening		Title	Director	Cast	Genre	Studio	Source
O C T	2	Besharam	Abhinav Kashyap	Ranbir Kapoor, Pallavi Sharda, Rishi Kapoor, Neetu Singh	Comedy/action	Reliance Entertainment, Movie Temple Productions	
O C T	11	War Chhod Na Yaar	Faraz Haider	Sharman Joshi, Jaaved Jaaferi, Soha Ali Khan, Sanjay Mishra	War comedy		
O C T	11	Baat Bann Gayi	Shuja Ali	Ali Fazal, Gulshan Grover, Anisa	Comedy		
O C T	11	Ekk Thee Sanam	Monish Kaushal	Nisha Triloki, Rajender Thakur, Gopal Thakur	Drama		
O C T	11	Paapi - Ek Satya Katha	Aziz Sejawal	Arya Babbar, Prosenjit Chatterjee, Sayantika Banerjee, Pooja Bharti, Rajesh Sharma, Harish Patel	Crime		
O C T	16	Boss	Anthony D'Souza	Akshay Kumar, Mithun Chakraborty, Danny Denzongpa, Ronit Roy, Aditi Rao Hydari, Shiv Panditt, Johny Lever	Masala	Viacom18 Motion Pictures, Cape of Good Films, Ashwin Varde Production	
O C T	18	Shahid	Hansal Mehta	Rajkummar Rao, Tigmanshu Dhulia, Kay Kay Menon, Prabal Panjabi	Drama/biography	UTV Spotboy, AKFPL, Bohra Bros	
O C T	25	Wake Up India	Babloo Seshadri	Chirag Patil, Sai Tamhankar, Manoj Joshi, Aanjjan Srivastav, Mukesh Tiwari, Mohan Joshi, Milind Gunaji, Anant Jog, Adi Irani, Mushtaq Khan, Atul Parchure, Asrani, Anjula Singh Mahor	Political/drama		
O C T	25	Amdavad Junction	Apurv Bajpai	Rohan Jardosh, Saurabh Singh, Gunjan Vyas, Touqeer Khan, Ishita Salot, Devendra Trivedi, Hitesh Patel, Swapna Nair	Crime/drama		
O C T	25	Dilli Gang	Ashish Tyagi	Darshan Jariwala, Neena Kulkarni, Yashpal Sharma, Amir Dalvi, Asif Basra, Asif Ali	Crime		
O C T	25	Mickey Virus	Saurabh Varma	Manish Paul, Elli Avram, Varun Badola, Manish Chaudhary, Puja Gupta	Comedy/thriller	DAR Motion Pictures, Awesome Films, Trilogic Media	
O C T	25	Ishk Actually	Anish Khanna	Rajeev Khandelwal, Raayo S. Bakhirta, Neha Ahuja, Ann Mitchai, Neha Ghelot, Siddharth Van Shipley	Romance		
O C T	25	Sooper Se Ooper	Shekhar Ghosh	Vir Das, Kirti Kulhari, Gulshan Grover, Deepak Dobriyal, Yashpal Sharma	Comedy	Reliance Entertainment, Jigsaw Pictures	
N O V	1	Krrish 3	Rakesh Roshan	Hrithik Roshan, Priyanka Chopra, Kangana Ranaut, Vivek Oberoi	Superhero	FilmKraft Productions	
N O V	8	Satya 2	Ram Gopal Varma	Puneet Singh Ratn, Anaika Soti, Mahesh Thakur, Aradhna Gupta, Raj Premi, Vikram Singh	Crime	Mammoth Media & Entertainment, Sreshth Media, LR Media	
N O V	15	Rajjo	Vishwas Patil	Kangana Ranaut, Paras Arora, Mahesh Manjrekar, Prakash Raj, Jaya Prada	Romance		
N O V	15	Goliyon Ki Raasleela Ram-Leela	Sanjay Leela Bhansali	Ranveer Singh, Deepika Padukone, Richa Chadha, Supriya Pathak	Romance/drama	Eros International, Bhansali Productions	
N O V	15	Kaand: Black Scandal	Santosh K. Gupta	Suraj K. Shah, J. B. Rana, Dipanshi	Drama		
N O V	22	Gori Tere Pyaar Mein	Punit Malhotra	Imran Khan, Kareena Kapoor, Shraddha Kapoor, Anupam Kher	Romance/comedy	Reliance Entertainment, Dharma Productions	
N O V	22	Singh Saab The Great	Anil Sharma	Sunny Deol, Amrita Rao, Johny Lever, Urvashi Rautela	Action	Pen Studios, Alumbra Entertainment	
N O V	29	Bullett Raja	Tigmanshu Dhulia	Saif Ali Khan, Sonakshi Sinha, Jimmy Sheirgill, Vidyut Jamwal, Chunky Pandey	Comedy/crime/romance	Fox Star Studios, Moving Pictures, BrandSmith Motion Pictures	
D E C	6	R... Rajkumar	Prabhudeva	Shahid Kapoor, Sonakshi Sinha, Sonu Sood, Asrani, Ashish Vidyarthi	Action/romance	Eros International, Next Gen Films	
D E C	13	Jackpot	Kaizad Gustad	Sachiin J Joshi, Naseeruddin Shah, Sunny Leone	Thriller/comedy	Viking Media & Entertainment	
D E C	13	What the Fish	Gurmmet Singh	Dimple Kapadia, Manu Rishi, Manjot Singh, Anand Tiwari	Drama	Viacom18 Motion Pictures, Tipping Point Films, Light Forms Pictures	
D E C	20	Dhoom 3	Vijay Krishna Acharya	Aamir Khan, Abhishek Bachchan, Katrina Kaif, Uday Chopra, Jackie Shroff, Vikas Shrivastav	Action	Yash Raj Films	

== See also ==
- List of Bollywood films of 2014
- List of Bollywood films of 2012
