= Maassab =

Hindi feature film

- Directed by: Aditya Om
- Produced by: Rohini LB Singh
- Starring: Shiva Suryavanshi; Sheetal Singh; Kritika Singh; Narmadeshwar Dubey; Chandrabhushan Singh; Mannveer Choudharry; Sohit Soni
- Cinematography: Shrikant Asati
- Edited by: Prakash Jha
- Music by: Mahavir Prajapati
- Production company: Purushottam Studios
- Release dates: June 2018 (Cosmic Film Festival); 29 January 2021
- Running time: 114 minutes
- Country: India
- Language: Hindi

Maassab is a 2018 Hindi feature film on education in rural primary schools in India. Shiva Suryavanshi who is playing the male protagonist is making his acting debut. Sheetal Singh is playing female lead, while Kritika Singh, Narmadeshw ar Dubey, Brijeshwar Singh, Mannveer Choudharry play supporting roles. Actor Aditya Om is director of the movie.

The film premiered at the 2018 Cosmic Film Festival in Orlando, Florida, and was released in India on 29 January 2021.

== Story ==
In Maassab, the problem of education in rural primary schools in India is explored in a unique manner. Real education can be defined as the pillar of a secure, sensitive, and prosperous society. In the film, an attempt is made to highlight the challenges and resistance that rural India faces even today as it confronts education reforms.

== Cast ==
- Shiva Suryavanshi as Ashish Kumar
- Sheetal Singh as Usha Devi
- Brijeshwar Singh as Jitendra
- Sohit Soni as Nanhey
- Kritika Singh as Rama Devi
- ChandraBhushan Singh as Mahendra Yadav
- Manveer Choudhary as Awdhesh Kumar
- Hussain khan as BSA officer

== Awards ==
Maassab screened and won awards in many national and International film festivals.

- Finalist Best Actor (Shiva Suryavanshi): Cosmic Film Festival, Orlando, Florida, USA, 2018
- Winner Best Actor (Shiva Suryavanshi): Rajasthan International Film Festival, Jaipur, 2018
- Special appreciation director award (Aditya Om): Rajasthan international film festival, Jaipur, 2018
- Winner Best inspirational Film: Jharkhand International film festival awards, Ranchi, 2018
- Winner Best Director (Aditya Om): Ahamedabad International children film festival, Ahmedabad
- Official Selection: Kolkata international film festival, Kolkata, 2018
- Official Selection: Jagran film festival, Mumbai, 2018
- Official selection: Guwahati International film Festival
