= Rashi Mal =

Indian film actress

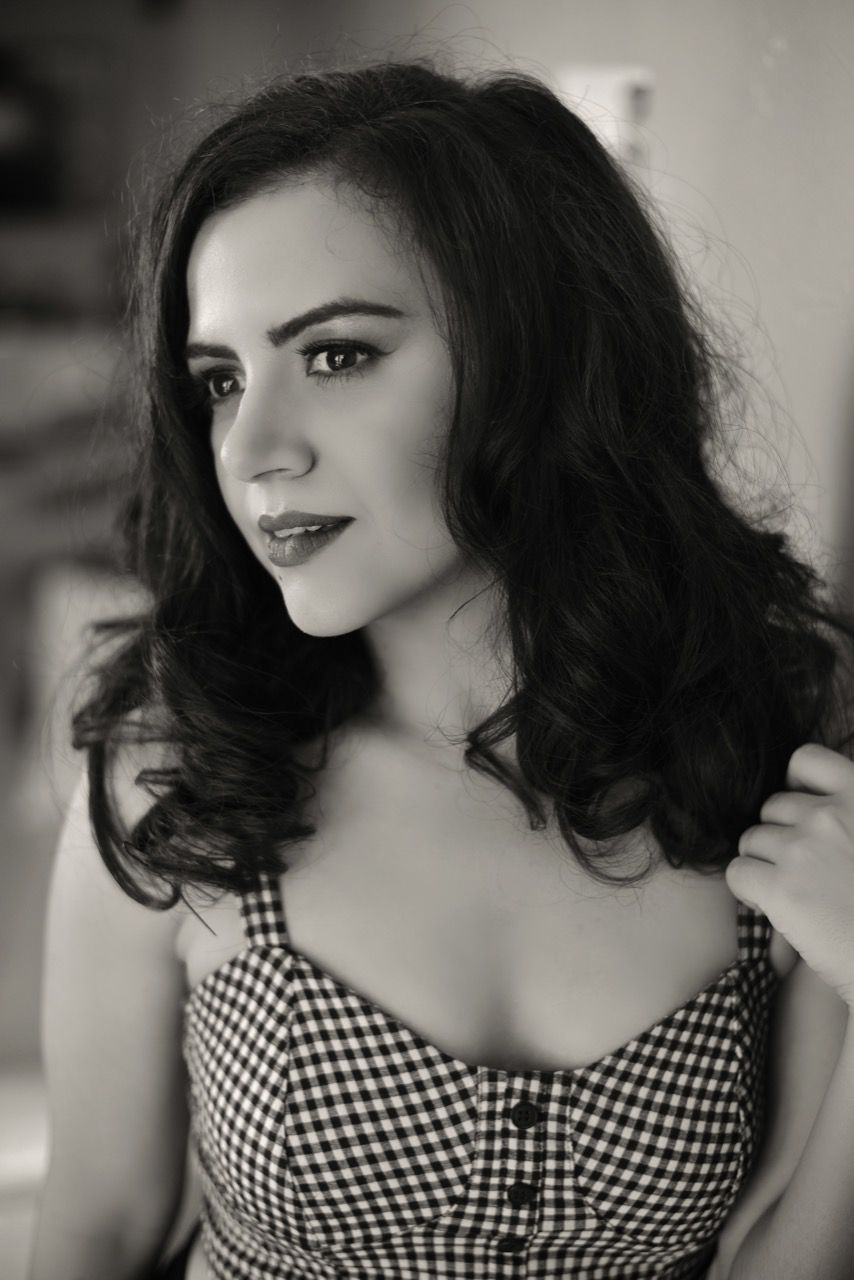
- Born: Delhi, India
- Occupation: Actress
- Known for: Brahmāstra: Part One – Shiva; Helicopter Eela; A.I.SHA My Virtual Girlfriend; Paanch 5 Wrongs Make A Right

Rashi Mal is an Indian actress, dancer and musician. She made her Hindi film debut in 2018 with Helicopter Eela alongside Kajol and Riddhi Sen.

== Early life and career ==
Mal was born and raised in Delhi. She started her career on stage and is trained in method acting. Mal made her Hindi debut with Helicopter Eela and played a pivotal role in the 2018 film Sir, that won the GAN Foundation award at Cannes Film Festival.

She has worked on multiple web series, each unique in concept such as Samaira Jal in Hindmata on Eros, Abigail in A.I.SHA My Virtual Girlfriend Voot/TF1 (France) and Saba in "Pyaar Actually" on Hotstar.

In 2014, Rashi played Gauri Laada's role in MTV's Paanch 5 Wrongs Make A Right.

In 2017, She sang the song Buri buri for the film Dear Maya.

Rashi released her debut single Misaal (Hindi) and Paradigm (English) that she wrote and sang in 2020.

She also worked in short films #Letters for MTV-Fameistan, directed by Gautam Govind Sharma and mentored by Mohit Suri and Food for Thought which was nominated for Filmfare Awards 2021.

As of March 2021, Mal is shooting for Ayan Mukerji's Brahmāstra alongside Alia Bhatt and Ranbir Kapoor.

Rashi has most recently worked on Ayan Mukerji's magnum opus Brahmāstra alongside Alia Bhatt and Ranbir Kapoor. The film released on 9th September 2022.

== Filmography ==
=== Films ===
†	Denotes films that have not yet been released

Year	Film	Role
2017	#Letters	Prakriti
2018	Helicopter Eela	Nikita
2018	Sir	Sabina
2020	Food for Thought	Simran
2022	Brahmāstra: Part One – Shiva	Shaina

=== Web series ===
Year	Show Name	Role	Platform
2017	Boygiri	Anahita	Alt Balaji
2017	Timeout	Kaya	Voot
2019	Pyaar Actually	Saba	Hotstar
2017-2019	A.I.SHA My Virtual Girlfriend	Abigail	Arre
2020	The Missing Stone	Payal	MX Player
2021	Hindmata	Samaira Jal	Eros Now

=== Television ===
Year	Program	Role	Channel
2014	Paanch 5 Wrongs Make A Right	Gauri Lada	Channel V India
2015	Gulmohar Grand	Saloni	Star Plus

== Discography ==
- "Buri buri" from the film Dear Maya
- "Beta get married" from "Sacchi Savitris"
- "Social Media Love” from "Sachhi Savitris"
- Misaal (original)
- Paradigm (original)

== Awards and honors ==
- MTV's IWM Buzz Digital Awards 2019
- 2022 ITA (Indian Television Awards) for webseries HINDMATA
