= Thaka Thimi Tha =

- DVD cover
- Directed by: Sundar C
- Written by: K. Selva Bharathy (dialogues)
- Screenplay by: Sundar C.
- Story by: K. Selva Bharathy
- Produced by: G. R. Ravindra
- Starring: Yuva Krishna; Ankitha
- Cinematography: Vijay K. Chakravarthy
- Edited by: P. Sai Suresh
- Music by: D. Imman
- Production company: AJR Arts
- Release date: 1 April 2005
- Running time: 140 minutes
- Country: India
- Language: Tamil

Thaka Thimi Tha is a 2005 Indian Tamil-language romantic comedy film directed by Sundar C., who also wrote the screenplay. The film stars newcomers Yuva Krishna and Ankitha.

== Plot ==
Krishna (Yuva Krishna) works at an eatery owned by Vivek (Vivek) while Gayathri (Ankitha) is a radio jockey. They are neighbours and their families begin to quarrel. Their families then start to like each other and become good friends. They decide to arrange the marriage between the young couple but they both refuse and Vivek tells them the reason.

Krishna and Gayathri fell in love with each other in college. From time to time, they were involved in small quarrels but the couple made up every time. One day, it was the "straw that broke the camel's back": Yuva told his friends about being close to Gayathri and described her, she got angry and they split up. After finishing college, Gayathri's family moved into a house opposite that of Yuva.

Their families and Vivek try their best to rejoin them but her relative Sri (Sriman) tries to win her heart and Gayathri even accepts to marry Sri. For the marriage of their friend in their college, Krishna and Gayathri return there. Vivek and their collegemates try to convince Krishna and Gayathri to be together again. Krishna has a change of heart, he convinces her with a song and they eventually reconcile.

== Cast ==
- Yuva Krishna as Krishna
- Ankitha as Gayathri
- Vivek as Vivek
- M. S. Viswanathan as Krishna's grandfather
- Rajeev as Rajesh, Krishna's father
- Manobala as Bala
- Sriman as Sri
- Sai Prashanth as Sehwag, Krishna's friend
- Dev Anand as Deva, Krishna's friend
- Deepak Dinkar as Krishna's friend
- Babloo as Krishna's friend
- Madhan Bob as Devadas
- Vichu Viswanath as Vichu
- Singamuthu as Sri's relative
- Periya Karuppu Thevar as Sri's relative
- Nirosha as Krishna's mother
- Devisri as Gayathri's mother
- Tejashree as Shanthi
- Paravai Muniyamma as Ariyammal
- Zabyn Khan as Rathi Varma
- Shakeela as Rama
- Chelladurai as Watchman
- Cell Murugan as Murugan
- Vellai Subbaiah as Priest

== Soundtrack ==
The soundtrack was composed by D. Imman.

Track listing
No.	Title	Lyrics	Singer(s)	Length
1.	"Etha Oothi Senjeno"	Na. Muthukumar	D. Imman, Anuradha Sriram
2.	"Hoodibaba"	P. Vijay	Franco, Premgi Amaren
3.	"Idhu Kallooriyalla"	K. Selva Bharathy	Harish Raghavendra
4.	"Imsaiye Unakku"	Thabhu Shankar	Srinivas
5.	"Kadhalai Yaaradi"	Thabhu Shankar	Hariharan, Mathangi
6.	"Kanne I Love You"	P. Vijay	Suchitra, Mahesh Vinayagam
7.	"Onna Roundu"	P. Vijay	Vasu, Solar Sai, Prasanna Rao, T. S. Ranganathan
8.	"Rayalaseema Rani"	Na. Muthukumar	Karthik, Anita Udeep
9.	"Sulukki Sulukkedukkum"	Na. Muthukumar	Devan, Malathy

== Release and reception ==
The film was released alongside the low budget films Girivalam and Gurudeva and did not fare well at the box office.

Malini Mannath of Chennai Online wrote that "It seems like a script written in haste, with not much serious thought going into it. A disappointment from the team of Sunder C. and K Selvabharathi (director and story dialogue writer respectively), who'd given us such a breezy entertainer like 'Ullathai Allithaa'. Thaka Dhimi Tha is just wasted steps!" Kalki called it an age old love story and called Vivek as the only positive. Sify wrote "Thakathimitha directed by Sundar.C, is yet another campus love story with no big surprises as the story and presentation is already seen in umpteen films in the same genre. This time the hero is Yuva Krishna a debutant and giving his company is Vivek in a full length role. Of course Vivek hogs the show but is as stale as yesterday’s sambar!"
