= Lahiri Lahiri Lahirilo =

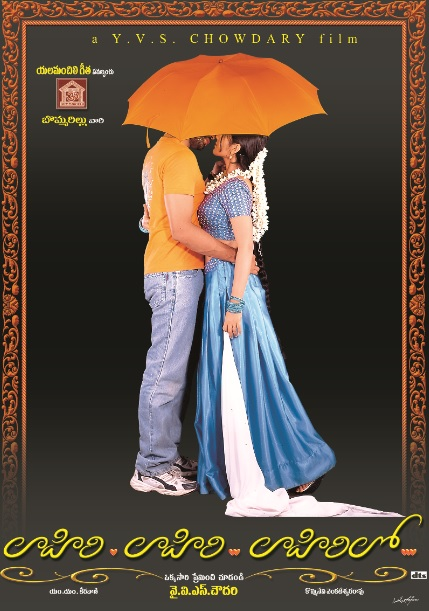
- Movie poster
- Directed by: YVS Chowdary
- Written by: Chintapalli Ramana (Dialogues)
- Screenplay by: YVS Chowdary
- Story by: YVS Chowdary
- Produced by: YVS Chowdary
- Starring: Nandamuri Harikrishna; Bhanupriya; Suman; Rachana; Aditya; Ankitha; Vineeth; Sanghavi; K. Viswanath; Sathyapriya; Lakshmi
- Cinematography: K. Rajendra Prasad; Madhu A. Naidu
- Edited by: Kotagiri Venkateswara Rao
- Music by: M. M. Keeravani
- Production company: Bommarillu
- Release date: 1 May 2002
- Running time: 156 minutes
- Country: India
- Language: Telugu

Lahiri Lahiri Lahirilo is a 2002 Indian Telugu-language musical-family drama film written, directed and produced by YVS Chowdary under the banner Bommarillu. The film stars four pairs Nandamuri Harikrishna, Bhanupriya, Suman, Rachana, Aditya, Ankitha, Vineeth and Sanghavi in the lead roles. Veteran actress Lakshmi played the main villain role in this film. This film is a hit at the box-office. The film won three Nandi Awards. The film's title is based on a song from Mayabazar (1957).

== Plot ==
Nani (Aditya) and Bala (Ankitha) study in the same college. The story begins with Nani arranging a marriage for his friends Veera Venkata Satya Narayana (Chitram Srinu) and Naga Venkata Ratna Kumari in Annavaram with the help of his classmate John David (Venu Madhav). Bala also joins the marriage. She gets to know that Nani is an orphan and starts liking Nani's attitude and behaviour. Nani also has same feelings towards Bala but he doesn't reveal them to her. After the marriage, John David tells her that he and Nani have arranged this marriage as part of their business A-1 Match Fixing Centre and Nani is actually a marriage broker who arranges marriages for making money. She gets upset when Nani bids her good bye saying that there is hardly any friendship between them.

Indu (Bhanupriya), Chandu (Rachana) and Sindhu (Sanghavi) are three daughters of Rama Krishna (Ranganath) and nieces of Ammayiamma (Rama Prabha). Indu is obsessed with cleanliness, Chandu is scared of lizards and Sindhu is a sincere worshipper. Rama Krishna lost his wife and his brother in law (Ammayiamma's husband) in a car accident and he believes the reason to be not believing in astrology. He strongly decides to get his three daughters married to three brothers only with whom their horoscopes match perfectly. Ammayiamma approaches Nani for finding suitable matches for her nieces. Nani suggests Ammayiamma the three sons of Balaramaiah Naidu (K. Viswanath) and Sathyapriya of Ramapuram village - Krishnama Naidu (Nandamuri Harikrishna) for Indu, Chandrama Naidu (Suman) for Chandu and Srinivasa Naidu (Vineeth) for Sindhu. Nani goes to Ramapuram as the younger brother of Indu, Chandu and Sindhu for Dasara festival celebrations and all four stay in the house of Punju Raju (K. Chakravarthy) which is exactly opposite to Balaramaiah Naidu's house. Nani plans to create love between the couples and get them married.

In his efforts to unite the three couples, he bumps into Bala again who is the only younger sister of the three brothers. Both exchange their love for each other but are scared to reveal it to her family. From then, the story takes a twist with the entry of Achamamba (Lakshmi) who was once in love with Balaramaiah Naidu and is waiting to take revenge on him for not marrying her. By winning in the village cockfight, she convinces Balaramaiah Naidu for getting his daughter Bala married to foreign returned son of her brother (Jaya Prakash Reddy). The rest of the plot is all about how Achamamba's evil plans are destroyed by Krishnama Naidu and the four couples got married.

== Cast ==
- Nandamuri Harikrishna as Krishnama Naidu
- Bhanupriya as Indu
- Suman as Chandrama Naidu
- Rachana as Chandu (voice dubbed by Sunitha)
- Aditya as Nani (voice-over by Devi Sri Prasad)
- Ankitha as Bala (voice dubbed by Savitha Reddy)
- Vineeth as Srinivasa Naidu
- Sanghavi as Sindhu
- Lakshmi as Achchamamba
- K. Viswanath as Balaramaiah Naidu
- K. Chakravarthy as Punju Raju
- Kanta Rao as priest
- Sathyapriya as Balaramaiah Naidu's wife
- Jaya Prakash Reddy as Achchamamba's nephew
- Ranganath as Rama Krishna
- Rama Prabha as Ammayiamma
- Achyuth as Suryam
- Kalpana as Suryam's wife
- Venu Madhav as John David
- Chitram Srinu as Veera Venkata Satya Narayana
- Gokina Rama Rao
- G. V. Sudhakar Naidu

== Production ==
After the release of Yuvaraju, no producer approached Chowdary with directorial opportunities which led to Chowdary floating his production company titled "Bommarillu" and to have a story that has multiple pairs, that belongs to different generation and age groups which became Lahiri Lahiri Lahirilo, titled after the song from Mayabazar.

Choudary originally planned the film with actors Hari Krishna, Prakash raj, and Rajendra Prasad with Bhanu Priya pairing opposite Hari Krishna, Ramya Krishna for Prakash Raj, and Sanghavi for Rajendra Prasad since Prakash Raj was banned by MAA association and Ramya Krishna was busy with Tamil films, Choudary thought of selecting Sai Kumar but finally chosen Suman for that character with Rachana being his pair. Rajendra Prasad was replaced by Vineeth. Debutant Aditya was chosen as lead actor.

== Soundtrack ==
The soundtrack of this film is composed by M. M. Keeravani and all the lyrics were written by Sirivennela Seetharama Sastry. The soundtrack received positive reviews. The sound track included huge number of tracks and lengthy songs which met with huge success. The tracklist featured eminent singers like Keeravani himself, K.S.Chitra, Sonu Nigam, Udit Narayan, Kumar Sanu, Sukhwinder Singh, Sunitha Upadrashta, P. Unnikrishnan, Kalyan Koduri & Ganga. All the tracks were hit tracks, but the track "Kallaloki Kallu Petti" sung by K.S.Chitra and Udit Narayan became a huge chartbuster. "Mantramedo", "Ohoho Chilakkamma", "Nesthama", "Lahiri Lahiri Lahirilo" were other chartbusters. Telugu Cinema wrote "Keeravani's musical score is passable. He tried a few melody based tunes but somehow, the soul is missing. First half of the songs in the album sound slightly better than the second half. However, it is painful to see this senior music director going after Bollywood singers, while new and young music directors in Tollywood are experimenting with fresh and talented telugu singers. Most of them do not make a pleasant listening. This album clearly suffers from a bad choice of play back singers. It could have been an above average album, but thanks to the Bollywood singers, it just ends up as an ordinary fare."

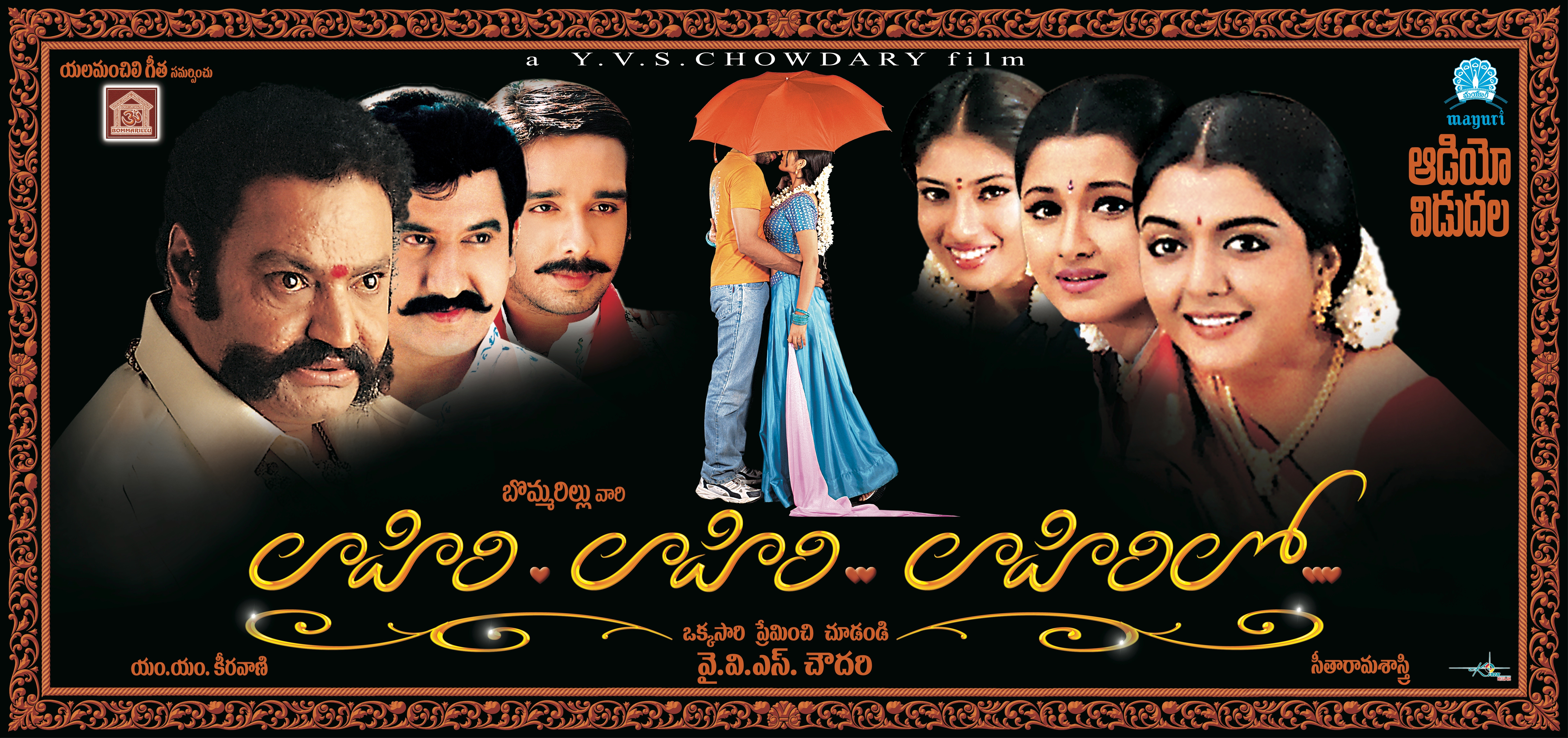
Audio release banner of Lahiri Lahiri Lahirilo

Track Listing
No.	Title	Singer(s)	Length
1.	"Kallaloki Kallu Petti"	K. S. Chithra, Udit Narayan	6:27
2.	"Veeravenkata"	M. M. Keeravani	5:36
3.	"Lahiri Lahiri Lahirilo"	Unnikrishnan, Sunitha	5:54
4.	"Nesthama"	Sonu Nigam, Sunitha	6:00
5.	"Manase Bit-1"	M. M. Keeravani, Ganga	1:25
6.	"Manthramedo"	K. S. Chithra, Kumar Sanu	5:53
7.	"Ohoho Chilakamma"	K. S. Chithra, Udit Narayan	5:25
8.	"Kilmire"	K. S. Chithra, Sukhwinder Singh	6:01
9.	"Manase Bit-2"	Kalyan Koduri, Ganga	1:25
10.	"Slokam"	Ganga	0:46

== Reception ==
Idlebrain wrote "YVS Chowdary tried making a complete family story with necessary quotient of mass elements. He succeeded in narrating the story in an interesting style with the twists inserted at the right moments. His ability to select good music and finesse in canning songs with a romantic flavor helped the film become a musical entertainer. But, he tried splitting up the scenes equally between four pairs. This led the film to become a 3-hour fare and scenes between Suman-Rachana and Vineeth-Sanghavi are little boring. In the climax too he tried putting too many mass elements (like the climax of his other film Seetarama Raju), which would really irk the sensibilities of audiences". The Hindu wrote "The story combines too many plots and too many characters making the narration quite confusing and lengthy lasting for almost three hours. It heavily banks upon Harikrishna's performance and he rises to the situation, using all his experience he gained since the days of his father NTR stardom with whom he co-starred in many a film". Andhra Today wrote "One can be see glimpses of YVS Chaudary's efforts to make it a great movie, but alas, they seem misdirected. Chaudary, though not so lucky as a director, does not hesitate to spend on the lavish sets as a producer. The treatment of the theme appears to belong to the 80s".

== Awards ==
Nandi Awards - 2002-2003

- Best Character Actor - Harikrishna
- Best Character Actress - Bhanupriya
- Best Female Comedian - Rama Prabha
