= Paanch 5 Wrongs Make A Right =

- Genre: Thriller; Drama
- Written by: Aseem Arora; Koel Chaudhuri
- Country of origin: India
- Original language: Hindi
- No. of seasons: 1
- No. of episodes: 67

Production
- Producer: Sudhir Sharma

Original release
- Network: Channel V India
- Release: 27 November 2013 – 17 July 2014

Paanch 5 Wrongs Make a Right is an Indian thriller television series that aired on Channel V India from 27 November 2013 to 17 July 2014. The show deals with the theme of "bullying". The story revolves around a teenage girl named Roshni Kataria who wants to take revenge from five seniors who brutally ragged and tortured her sister in the college premises eventually leading to her suicide.

== Overview ==
Paanch 5 Wrongs Make a Right is about an 18-year-old Roshni Kataria who wants to become a scientist. She came from Nagpur, India with a family which consists of her father and her elder Sister Neha Kataria. Roshni loves Neha a lot and quite attached to her. Roshni and Neha have a childhood companion in Nikhil who loves Roshni since Childhood. Neha is a strong bold girl while Roshni is bit insecure, soft and timid. Neha’s aspiration is to become a writer and destiny took her to Regents College Mumbai. There, Neha encounters five seniors who are considered "Devils" of the college. The five seniors are in their final year and rule the college. Zara Ahmed Khan - an aspiring singer and graffiti artist, Nihaal Sharma - an aspiring Photographer, Yudhishtir Kharbanda - drunk on his father's political powers, Roy D'Souza - who lives on drugs and Gauri Laada - the Leader of the Gang, a woman who has a dangerous attitude and is afraid of nothing. The whole college is feared by them but Neha doesn't give into their demands. Hence, she became the subject of their torture and oppression. Her only saviour is Gautam Laada aka Gauti, younger brother of Gauri who has some kind of a mysterious personality.

One day, Roshni learned about her sister's death and this broke her heart. Having filled with immense agony which later turned into aggression, Roshni decides to skip her US trip and her goal to become a scientist and instead get vengeance. Roshni went undercover and took an admission test in the same regents college where her sister studied. Roshni vowed to take revenge on all evil doers one by one. She crafted a unique plan to befriend the group, to understand their weaknesses and then destroy them. Roshni managed to knock off Zara, Nihal and Roy. But Gauri found out about her real identity before she can get her hands off on Yudi. The Gang captured her and tortured her brutally as well. Nikhil decided to stand by her. Roshni also has a friend in 'Shivani' who is in love with Nikhil. She disliked Nikhil's concern for Roshni. Roshni somehow gathers strength and made a comeback at Regents College and continued her revenge. She managed to knock out Yudi by this time.

She also managed to defeat Gauri in a race championship at College. Things began to heat up as the gang tried numerous ways to kill Roshni. But eventually Roshni became victorious by foiling their plans and punishing them. Roshni has fallen in love with Gauti, who pretended to be in love with her. He was also supposed to be in love with his elder sister Neha too. Roshni reached a point where everyone betrayed her. Gauti killed Nihal by shooting and framed Roshni falsely for her death. Shivani testified against her. It came out that Gauti was a step brother of Gauri and hates her. In a turn of events, Gauti starts blackmailing Gauri. Seeing no way out, Gauri strikes a deal with Nikhil to get Roshni out from prison if only he could foil Gauti's plans.

Roshni knew about Gauti's misdeeds. Also she learned that Gauti was the real murderer of her elder sister Neha. Gauti was actually a womanizer who plays safe initially and uses this to charm ladies. Neha never showed interest in Gauti. Gauti forced himself upon her, and Neha slapped him. He responded by throwing Neha off the terrace. Gauri tried to kill Roshni again. But Roshni survived and schemes to trap Gauri and her gang. The gang is captured after being drugged. Roshni and Nikhil sets up a chamber in Regents College full of traps. Roshni forced each member of the gang to confess their crimes. It is then revealed, that the actual murderers of Neha wasn't Gauti alone but 'Paanch' themselves. Everyone is arrested except Gauri and Gauti who tried to knock each other off in order to survive and fell off the cliff. One of them died at the spot. Roshni returned home and finally offered love, peace, and condolence to Neha. After that, Roshni went off to US to become a scientist.

== Cast ==
- Sheetal Singh as Roshni Kataria
- Rashi Mal as Gauri Laada
- Ronjini Chakraborty as Zara Ahmed Khan
- Shrey Pareek as Nihaal Sharma
- Aashish Mehrotra as Yudhishtir "Yudi" Kharbanda
- Kiran Srinivas as Roy D'Souza
- Pratap Hada as Gautam "Gauti" Laada
- Ravjeet Singh as Nikhil Shukla
- Aakansha Malhotra as Shivani Rai
- Sanjay Batra as Pushkar Kharbanda
- Akansha Kapil as Neha Kataria

== Reception ==
Writer Aseem Arora got nominated at the ITA awards along with Director Shashank.
