= Kaand: Black Scandal =

- Directed by: Santosh K. Gupta
- Produced by: Jagbir Singh Siwatch
- Starring: Suraj K. Shah; J. B. Rana; Dipanshi; Mahimaa
- Cinematography: Jai Nandan Kumar, Roopang Acharya
- Edited by: Ram Gopal Verma
- Music by: Sangita Trivedi, Param Kishor, Jagjit Singh (Babby), Sachin Dhavre, Sanjay Bagga
- Distributed by: Dilsa Distributors Mumbai
- Release date: November 2013
- Country: India
- Language: Hindi Official website

Kaand Black Scandal (Hindi: कांड ब्लैक स्कैंडल) is a 2013 Bollywood film, set in the Meerut city of Uttar Pradesh, written and directed by Santosh K. Gupta and starring Suraj K. Shah, J. B. Rana, Dipanshi Sharma and Mahimaa Shrivastav in lead roles. It was distributed by Dilsa Distributors Mumbai and the music was released on Yellow And Red Music. The film premiered on 15 November 2013 in Mumbai and was released throughout India in April 2014.

== Cast ==
- Suraj K. Shah as Rajveer - A final year student of D.J. College, Rajveer is lazy, naughty, ambitionless, but young and happening friend of Sandy, Mandy and Batla. Although he is good for nothing, there is something about him that draws you to him. In life he wants - no burdens, no boundaries, no expectation, no pressure... Just freedom.
- J. B. Rana as Beera - The sport officer in D.J. College. He motivates and inspires his team to think big. He loves and cares too much about his brother... Raajveer.
- Dipanshi as Seema - Very bold and moody student who used to ignore Beera.
- Mahimaa as Rekha - A good looking and charming character who enjoys reciting poetry.
- Shobna as Gujri
- Sanjiv Nehra as Viraj
- Surendar Bawra as Dharamdas
- Preet Bhatti as Umed
- Sanjiv Arora as Ajit
- Riyaz Indian as Pelwaan
- Nikhil Saxena as Sandy
- Saiyed as Mandy
- Satish as Batla

== Plot ==
Kaand is the story of brothers who return to their village and find themselves pulled into a feudal intrigue. Beera is a sports coach in the college in which his younger brother Rajveer (Suraj K. Shah) is a student. Beera falls for the new girl in college, Seema, but she turns down his marriage proposal. Rajveer falls in love with another college student, Rekha, but she too rejects him.

Beera and Rajveer go to their village during college holidays. Seema, too, lands in the same village to visit her uncle, Viraj. Beera and Seema meet often and soon fall in love. However, when Beera tells his father, Dharamdas, that he wants to marry Seema, he refuses. Dharamdas tells Beera about the incident that had happened decades ago. Dharamdas's wife, Rukmani, considers Viraj her brother. She had gone to his house on Raksha Bandhan to tie him a rakhi but never returned. Viraj claimed that Rukmani didn't come to his house, but Dharamdas suspected him of lying and of having killed or kidnapped her.

The relationship between Dharamdas and Viraj had soured, and now Dharamdas didn't want to have anything to do with Viraj.

Rekha comes to visit Seema and meets Rajveer again. They also soon fall in love.

Meanwhile, Gujri, wife of Ajit Singh, who is Viraj's brother, hatches a plan to get their son, Umed, married to Seema, who is the niece of Viraj's wife. Gujri realizes that Seema loves Beera, so she kills her husband Ajit to frame Beera for his murder. Beera is arrested by the police. But the police soon learn that Gujri has kidnapped Seema to force her to marry Umed.

Will Seema be freed? Will Seema and Beera find love? Will Rajveer and Rekha find love? And is Rajveer's mother still alive?

== Production ==
The film was shot in Delhi, Meerut, Modinagar Gaziyabaad, Aghera village, Kausani, Nainitaal. The college scenes took place at the D.J. College of Dental Sciences & Research Niwari Road, Modinagar, Ghaziabad, (U.P.)

== Soundtrack ==
The film's soundtrack was composed by Jagjit Singh Bubby, Sanjay Bagga, Sachin Dhavre, Param and Sanjgeeta Trivedi, with lyrics penned by Ravi Chopra, Shahid Dilshad Shamli, Santosh Gupta and J. B. Rana.

| Track# | Song | Singer(s) | Duration |
|---|---|---|---|
| 1 | "Baar Baar Kehti Hoon" | Neetu Singh | 3:44 |
| 2 | "Bijhde Huye Do Dil" | Nitesh Kumar & Jamuna | 3:56 |
| 3 | "Dekhe Bina Tujhko Toh" | Sonu Nigam & Mahimaa | 5:06 |
| 4 | "Dil Mein tumhare Kya Uljhan" | Jhirimi, sonu sikandar, soni | 7:14 |
| 5 | "Samajh Aankhon Ke Ishare" | Neetu Singh & Sonu Sikandar | 2:06 |
| 6 | "Chandi Badan Ye" | Kiran Shail | 4:45 |
| 7 | "Tujhko Dekhu Toh" | Jhirimi & Deepak Daba | 2:58 |

== Reception ==
Kaand: Black Scandal opened to positive reviews across India. It got a positive review on B-town.in.
