= Daayan (TV series) =

Indian television series

- Genre: Supernatural; Horror
- Created by: Ekta Kapoor
- Developed by: Ekta Kapoor
- Screenplay by: Ritu Goyal; Rechal Navare; Dialogues; Aparna Nadig
- Story by: Amitabh Mishra; Veerendra Sahni; Mohd Zeeshan; Mahipal Saini
- Directed by: Jitu Arora
- Creative directors: Chloe Ferns Qureshi; Riti Sahani
- Starring: Tina Datta; Priya Bathija; Mohit Malhotra
- Theme music composer: Lalit Sen; Nawab Arzoo
- Country of origin: India
- Original language: Hindi
- No. of seasons: 1
- No. of episodes: 66

Production
- Producers: Ekta Kapoor; Shobha Kapoor
- Editors: Vikas Sharma; Vishal Sharma; Sandip Bhatt
- Camera setup: Multi-camera
- Running time: 45 minutes
- Production company: Balaji Telefilms

Original release
- Network: &TV
- Release: 15 December 2018 – 28 July 2019

Daayan (English: Witch) is an Indian paranormal romance drama series created by Ekta Kapoor under Balaji Telefilms. It premiered on 15 December 2018 on &TV and starred Tina Datta, Mohit Malhotra and Priya Bathija.

== Plot ==
The series revolves around two people who are madly in love with each other and how their lives change when a daayan enters their lives and creates havoc. The young Janvi Maurya, a well-educated and family-oriented girl from Ujjain, stumbles upon a dangerous ploy by an evil force as many unusual and mysterious happenings occur in her hometown. With her life on the line, she must unmask the identity of a daayan who is someone close to her. Accompanying her in this mission is her childhood friend and love interest, the wealthy and chivalrous Aakarsh Chaudhary. Janvi and Aakarsh marry with an intent to finish the daayan.

Later it is revealed that Asha, the maid, is Aakarsh's real mother and Aakarsh is the daayan. Due to her son's love, Asha is unable to kill Janvi. She joins hands with Saptroopa who erases Aakarsh's memory so that he forgets Janvi, his love, and marries Saptroopa instead. The daayan uses this opportunity to kill Janvi and offer her as a sacrifice to make herself immortal.

== Cast ==
=== Main ===
- Tina Datta as
  - Jhanvi Maurya: Narendra and Yamini's daughter; Manvi and Harsh's sister; Akarsh's wife (2018–2019)
  - Kundani Roy: Popular actress; Jhanvi's look-alike; Viraj's wife (2018)
- Mohit Malhotra as Akarsh Chaudhary: a male daayan; owner of The Fort; Asha and Veerendar's son; Jhanvi's husband (2018–2019)

=== Recurring ===
- Priya Bathija as Asha Chaudhary: Daayan; Kaalnemi's sister; Veerendar's wife; Akarsh's mother (2018–2019)
- Aashka Goradia as Saptroopa: Enchantress and vampire who was trapped within a redstone since 500 years; Akarsh's one-sided obsessive lover (2019)
- Anupama Solanki as Vaitalini: Queen of the devils; Asha's guru (2019)
- Aman Gandhi as Veer Singh Chauhan: Jhanvi's best friend; Prachi's husband (2018)
- Afreen Nasir Dastani as Prachi Mourya: Sonali and Ballabh's daughter; Prithvi's sister; Veer's wife (2018)
- Garima Goel as Manvi Mourya: Narendra's daughter; Jhanvi and Harsh's sister; Dibang's wife; Rimpi's mother (2018–2019)
- Yash Pandit as Dibang Bhasin: Manvi's husband; Rimpi's father (2018–2019)
- Nitanshi Goel as Rimpi Bhasin: Manvi and Dibang's daughter (2018–2019)
- Aakash Talwar as Harshvardhan "Kaaju" Mourya: Narendra's son; Manvi and Jhanvi's brother; Jananta's husband (2018–2019)
- Rishika Nag as Jananta "Kishmish" Mourya: Harsh's wife (2018–2019)
- Hiten Tejwani as Viraj Roy: Kundani's husband (2019)
- Prabhat Bhattacharya as Prithvi Mourya: Sonali and Ballabh's son; Prachi's brother; Vishakha's husband (2018–2019)
- Ekta Saraiya as Vishakha Mourya: Prithvi's wife (2018–2019)
- Amit Singh Thakur as Narendra Mourya: Ballabh's brother; Manvi, Harsh and Jhanvi's father (2018–2019)
- Kanika Shivpuri as Sonali Mourya: Ballabh's widow; Prithvi and Prachi's mother (2018–2019)
- Urfi Javed as Nandini Mehra: Chandrika's sister; Akarsh's manager (2018–2019)
- Pavitra Punia as Chandrika Mehra: a restoration agent; Nandini's sister (2018–2019)
- Mala Salariya as Paatalini: Queen of the Underworld (2019)
- Neelu Dogra as Menka Raichand: Kartik's sister; Akarsh's foster mother; Asha's lackey (2018–2019)
- Abhinav Kohli as Kartik Raichand: Menka's brother; Asha's lackey (2019)
- Mishmee Das as Tanya Sharma: Jhanvi's friend (2018)
- Rohan Mehra as Rakesh Purohit: Jhanvi's friend (2018)
- Vimarsh Roshan as King Veerendar: a 500-year old wizard; Asha's husband (2019)
- Giriraj Kabra as Kaalnemi: Asha's brother; Akarsh's uncle; a male daayan (2019)

== See also ==
- List of Hindi horror shows
