= Tenali Rama (TV series) =

Indian historical comedy-drama television series

- Genre: Historical fiction; comedy-drama
- Created by: Abhimanyu Singh
- Written by: Amit Aaryan
- Screenplay by: Timir Baxi
- Directed by: Jackson Sethi; Maan Singh Manku
- Creative director: Dikshit Kaul
- Starring: See below
- Opening theme: Tenali Rama
- Composer: Souvyk Chakraborty
- Country of origin: India
- Original language: Hindi
- No. of seasons: 2
- No. of episodes: 990

Production
- Producer: Abhimanyu Singh
- Cinematography: Nishi Chandra
- Editor: Waseed Hussain
- Camera setup: Multiple camera
- Running time: 20-22 minutes
- Production company: Contiloe Entertainment

Original release
- Network: Sony SAB
- Release: 11 July 2017 – 19 July 2025

Tenali Rama is an Indian Hindi-language historical fiction comedy drama based on the life of the legendary Telugu poet Tenali Ramakrishna, one of the Ashtadiggajas at the court of Vijayanagara emperor Krishnadevaraya (C.E. 1509–1529).

The series premiered on Sony SAB on 11 July 2017 and concluded on 13 November 2020.

The second season aired from 16 December 2024 to 19 July 2025.

== Series overview ==
Series	Episodes	Originally released	
Series	Episodes	First released	Last released
1	804	11 July 2017	13 November 2020
2	186	16 December 2024	19 July 2025

== Plot ==
=== Season 1 ===
The series begins with the preparations of Rama's marriage with Sharada. Ramakrishna is a poor Brahmin who lives in a village called Tenali. Rama is found to be absconding from his own marriage and is later found to be dozing under a tree. Gundappa, his closest friend comes to wake him up and take him to his marriage. Rama, though loves Sharada, is not of the opinion to get married immediately to her. One day, he comes across Tathacharya, the royal priest of Vijayanagar. After a series of events, Tathacharya believes that Rama has insulted him. He challenges Rama to enter the city of Vijayanagar. Soon, Gundappa's father faces crisis due to his land not being ploughed, Rama tricked the villagers into believing that the field contains a treasure full of gold coins within it. And overnight, the entire population of Tenali dig up Gundappa's father's field. Hence, Rama is successful in getting the field dug up and ready for seed planting. By seeing his wit, wisdom, humor, intelligence and cleverness, a Sadhu tells him to go to the nearby temple of Kaali Mata and chant her name a thousand times so that he can be successful in life. As soon as Rama gets Kaali Mata's blessings, he marries Sharada and leaves for Vijayanagar. Over the years, he saves Vijayanagar from various dangerous opponents and threats. By using his wit, wisdom, humor, intelligence and cleverness, he becomes legendary royal advisor and one of the famous Ashtadiggajas Pandit Ramakrishna in Krishnadevaraya's court.

Nine months later

Legendary poet and royal advisor Pandit Ramakrishna in Krishnadevaraya's court uses his timely wit and intelligence to solve even the trickiest problems. His arch-rival Tathacharya, the royal priest, who wants to humiliate him, is often stumped by Rama's intelligence. Rama is very close to the King, Krishnadevaraya, often behaving and caring for each other like best friends. Rama's wife Sharada gets pregnant with their son, Bhaskara. Bhaskara is shown to have been an active part of Rama's clever ploys eve while being a baby who could just cry.

Six years later

Bhaskara, Ramakrishna's son, is a naughty child and causes his father to be humiliated in the court of Krishnadevaraya multiple times, to which Rama starts punishing Bhaskara for his naughtiness. He stops spoiling Bhaskara like he used to in his childhood making Bhaskara realising his mistakes. Prince Balakumara arrives in Vijaynagar. Balakumara is Krishnadevaraya second wife, Tirumalamba's, brother. Balakumara is a spoiled prince who cares a lot about his hair. Bhaskara who was in Tathacharya's home to get Tathacharya to forgive him on his father's orders had to glue together a broken vase to repent. Balakumara, who is also at Tathacharya's home to learn from him, accidentally puts on the broken vase as a crown. The vase had glue on it, which causes it to be stuck to Balakumara's hair. Later, Balakumara's hair pulled off his head to remove the vase and he never gets his hair back. Due to the incident, Balakumara is forever angry at Bhaskara, who is blamed for Balakumara's mistake. Bhaskara is then sent to Gurukul away from Vijaynagar for 20 years as punishment. Three months later, Krishnadevaraya and Ramakrishna have a debate about whether the golden era of Vijayanagar would end, foreshadowing the future.

Twenty years later

Bhaskara returns from Gurukul and finds from the reformed Tathacharya that Balakumara was crowned king after King Krishnadevaraya left the kingdom for an unknown reason and as there was no one else from the royal lineage to be crowned the monarch. Kaikala, Balakumara's uncle and Mahamatya, is actually running the kingdom. Bhaskara's family left Vijaynagar, and Bhaskara tries to find them. He eventually identifies Mooshak, the leader of a bandit group to be his mother, Sharada. On one of his attempts to interact with Amrapali, Mahamatya Kaikala's daughter, he eavesdrops on Kaikala revealing that he had kidnapped and imprisoned Maharaja Krishnadevaraya and Pandit Ramakrishna for twenty years. Kaikala soon received news that Pandit Ramakrishna had fled from prison after befooling the guards during a thunderstorm. Bhaskara is astounded to know all this. He then pretends to be his father, Ramakrishna, to give justice to people in Vijayanagar. He gives back Tathacharya his position as royal priest, which he had lost for many years, which causes Tathacharya to become evil again. Eventually, Kaikala is caught trying to kill Balakumara, which causes the former to be put in jail for life. Balakumara's wife and Kaikala's assistant, Sulakshana Devi eventually gets Balakumara banished from Vijayanagara and assumes the role of a ruler.

Four months later

Ramakrishna returns to Vijaynagar and stops Sulakshana Devi from being crowned the Empress of Vijayanagar in a way makes that in 4 years, Sulakshana Devi's adopted son, Swami, will be crowned emperor of Vijayanagar. Sulakshana Devi's Minister and Kaikala's son, Pralayankar, Sulakshana Devi's brother Bharkam, and Sulakshana Devi's sister Charulata try to beat Ramakrishna but fails. Krishnadevraya returns with his wives and punishes Sulakshana Devi by ordering her to find her husband Balakumara who was banished from the kingdom. Many people come to get rid of Ramakrishna but he stays put and saves Vijayanagar from various enemies. At last, Ramakrishna realises that the youth in Tenali are going out to achieve their jobs, leaving their native village Tenali, undeveloped. Ramakrishna immediately gets ready to leave back to Tenali, his native village, forsaking Vijayanagar kingdom to help the youth in Tenali and its development. Since then, the people gave him the name "Tenali Ramakrishna" for his love to his homeland.

== Cast ==
=== Main ===
- Krishna Bharadwaj as
  - Pandit Tenali "Rama" Ramakrishna: The legendary poet, chief advisor and one of the Ashtadiggaja in Krishnadevaraya's court. (2017-2019; 2020, 2024-2025)
  - Sudama: A doppelganger of Rama who tried to kill Krishnadevraya but was later sent to prison. (2018)
  - Bhaskara Sharma: Ramakrishna and Sharada's son; He is a lookalike of his father. (2019-2020)
    - Pratyaksh Panwar as Child Bhaskara. (2019)
    - Ayaan as Baby Bhaskara.(2018–2019)
- Pankaj Berry as
  - Tathacharya: Krishnadevraya's father figure; Varunmala's husband; Saudamini's love interest; Ananta Lakshmi's brother; Amrapali's foster father. The royal priest of Vijayanagar. He is cunning, opportunistic, greedy, hypocritical and Rama's rival. He doesn't want Krishnadevraya to favour and applaud Rama and is always jealous of Rama's achievements. Over the years, he becomes fond of Rama and repents. He becomes a just and wise man. (2017-2020) He turns to his cunning, opportunistic, greedy, hypocritical self following Rama's banishment from the royal court. (2024-2025)
  - Venkanna: A hardworking washerman who was a lookalike of Tathacharya. Rama uses his addiction of betting to prove himself innocent to the king. (2025)
- Manav Gohil as Maharaja Krishnadevaraya: Queen Chinna Devi and Queen Tirumalamba's husband; Achyutadevaraya's elder brother. A notable emperor of the Vijayanagara Empire. He is a just, courageous, wise and far-sighted king who loves his people populace immensely. (2017-2019)
  - Tarun Khanna replaced Gohil as Maharaja Krishnadevaraya: He came after 20 years of exile into the Vijayanagara Empire and was shocked by the problems faced by the people of the Empire. He rebuilds the Golden Era of the Vijayanagara Empire after the reign of Balakumaran and Sulakshana Devi. (2020)
  - Aditya Redij replaced Khanna as Maharaja Krishnadevraya: He banishes Rama from the royal court and faces a looming threat to the Kingdom's security. (2024-2025)
  - Hari Om: A woodcutter who is a lookalike of the king. The king called him to Vijayanagar to test his courtiers. (2017)
- Jiten Mukhi as Mahamantri Timmarasu: Krishnadevraya's Chief Minister and father figure; Rama's friend. He is an Honest, Loyal and Hardworking minister and one of the few characters who knew about Tathacharya's greed and selfishness. He always supported and helped Rama. (2017–2019)
  - Amit Pachori replaced Mukhi as Mahamantri Timmarasu: He is believed to have strength of 10 bulls and is known as Heart of Vijayanagar. (2024-2025)
- Sumit Kaul as Girgit Raj: He is cunning and versatile, known for his ability to disguise himself and deceive others. (2024-2025)
- Pavitra Punia as Laila: Sultanet assassin and a Vishkanya. (2025)

=== Recurring ===
- Priyamvada Kant as Sharada: Rama's wife; Lakshmi Amma's daughter-in-law; Bhaskara's mother; Govind's elder sister. A naive but kind-hearted lady. She has a catchphrase "Uthalo" (trans. Pick Up). (2017–2018; 2024-2025)
  - Niya Sharma replaced Kant as Sharada (2018–2019)
  - Aasiya Kazi replaced Sharma as Sharada (2019–2020)
- Nimisha Vakharia as Lakshmi Amma: Rama's mother; Sharada's mother-in-law; Bhaskara's grandmother. After becoming a widow, she took a vow of silence for life and uses sign language which can only be understood by Sharada. (2017–2019; 2020; 2024-2025)
- Krish Parekh as Gundappa: Rama's brother-like-friend. He left his parents in Tenali to become successful in life by living with Rama in Vijayanagar. (2017-2019)
  - Aman Mishra as Adult Gundappa: He helped Bhaskara against Kaikala and other enemies. (2019–2020)
- Sonia Sharma as Maharani Chinna Devi: Krishnadevraya's first wife. She was a former royal dancer whom Krishnadevaraya marries and was crowned as Vijaynagar's senior queen. (2017–2019; 2020; 2024-2025)
- Priyanka Singh as Maharani Tirumala Devi: Krishnadevraya's second wife. She was the princess of Srirangapatana who marries to Krishnadevraya and was crowned as Vijaynagar's junior queen. (2017–2019; 2020; 2024-2025)
- Sohit Soni as Manicharya: Tathacharya's Disciple and Dhanicharya's friend. He always silent insults Tathacharya along with Dhani. (2017–2020; 2024-2025)
- Sanjay Mangnani as Dhanicharya: Tathacharya's Disciple and Manicharya's friend. He always silent insults Tathacharya along with Mani. (2017–2020; 2024-2025)
- Shreya Patel as Padmavati: eldest among chatur chaar, her parents were abducted by girgat raj and started living with rama's family.(2024-2025)
- Aria Sakaria as Lachamma: her life was in danger when she was exposed to poisionus gas from gajashastra made by girgit raj and later was saved by rama and tathacharya by bringing Rakht Pushp. (2024-2025)
- Jitendra Pathak as Nagar Kotwal: He was an accomplice of Tathacharya but later left his side. His real name is probably Sarvapalli as mentioned in a subtitle of a season 1 episode. (2017–2019; 2024-2025)
- Neha Chauhan as Varunmala: Tathacharya's wife. She is dedicated to her husband and she always thought him as a divine person who is blessed by the God. (2017–2019; 2024-2025)
- Heer Chopra as Saudamini: Royal Dancer in Krishnadevraya's court; Tathacharya's love interest. (2017–2019; 2020; 2025)
- Trishaan Shah as Vachaspati (2024-2025)
- Afnaf Khatri as Balabhadra: Because of overeating, he was kicked out of his house by his step-mother. He later became part of the Chatur Chaar. (2024-2025)
- Nishi Singh as Pushpavalli: Kotwal's wife and a plump woman. (2017–2018)
- Tejal Adivarekar: replaced Nishi singh as Pushpavalli. (2025)
- Rishina Kandhari as Goddess Lakshmi. Also portrayed, Navadurga, Kaali and Saraswati. (2018–2019; 2020)
- Chahat Pandey as Ananta Lakshmi: Tathacharya's younger sister; Govind's love interest. (2018)
- Meghan Jadhav as Govind: Sharda's younger brother; Ananta Lakshmi's love interest. (2018)
- Shakti Anand as Maharaja Balakumaran: Tirumalamba's cousin brother; Sulakshana Devi's husband; Kaikala's maternal nephew; Swami's adopted father. He was made King by royal priest, Tathacharya after Krishnadevaraya's exile. Later, He was exiled from Vijayanagar by his own wife and Kaikala. (2019–2020)
- Neetha Shetty as Maharani Sulakshana Devi: Balakumaran's wife; Swami's adopted mother. She was Kaikala's partner and was cunning like him. When Krishnadevaraya returned, She was exiled from Vijayanagar to find her husband. (2019–2020)
- Manul Chudasama as Princess Amrapali: Kaikala's daughter; Pralayankar's sister; Tathacharya's adopted daughter; Bhaskara's love interest. Upon finding out about her father and brother's deeds, she went to the forest to perform Tapasya to repent for their sins. (2019–2020)
- Dhruvi Jani as Kanta: Bhaskara's childhood best friend. She admires Bhaskara and supports him. (2019–2020)
  - Mahi Soni as Child Kanta (2019)
- Pradeep Kabra as Senapati Nakush: Kaikala's accomplice who was killed by Kaikala when he was trying to save himself. (2019–2020)
- Ajay Chaudhary as Mahamathya Pralayankar: Kaikala's son; Amrapali's brother; Charulata's husband. He is cunning, just like his father, but he was unmasked by Rama and declared a traitor.
- Deeksha Sonalkar/Aishwarya Sharma Bhatt as Mandakini: Royal dancer in Balakumaran's court. (2020)
- Cheshta Mehta as Charulata: Sulakshana Devi's sister; Pralyankar's wife. (2020)
- Ketan Karande as Bharkam: Sulakshana Devi's cousin (2020)
- Vishwajeet Pradhan as Mahamatya Kaikala: Maharaja Balakumar's maternal uncle; Pralayankar and Amrapali's father; Vijayanagar's High Minister; Nakush's master. A sly, merciless, evil official. He came to run the kingdom of Vijayanagar after his nephew Balakumara was crowned king. (2019-2020)
- Behazaad Khan as Salamat Khan: Army chief of Bahamani sultanate. Enemy of Vijaynagar and Krishnadevaraya. He joined hands with Girgit Raj against Vijaynagar. He also unleashes Vishkanya to kill Krishnadevaraya. (2024-2025)
- Ram Awana as
  - Kaalbelu / Somaiya (2018)
  - Mahmood Shah Bahmani II: Sultan of Bahmani Kingdom, rival to Krishnadevaraya and tries to overthrow him through different treacheries. (2025)
- Kunal Karan Kapoor as Lakshmanappa "Lakshman" Swaminarayan Bhattaru (2025)
- Nikhil Arya as Kotwal (2025)

=== Cameo ===
- Barkha Sengupta as Goddess Kali (2017,2024–25)
- Amit Sinha as Mathuradas, a singer.
- Rajesh Puri as Ramleela's Trainer.
- Anand Goradia as Bheeshan Babu, alias Ghungroo, Bahmani's assassin.
- Rajesh Khera as Samsuddin Zafar Khan, Kalikutta's sultan.
- Debina Bonnerjee as Mohini
- Nirbhay Wadhwa as Dhuaandhar Durjan, a wrestler.
- Vikas Verma as Marques de Pompador, The Portuguese magician.
- Omkar Das Manikpuri as Aghori Baba Danyebanye, alias Futlubin Pimpin, Bahmani's commander and Ghungroo's elder brother.
- Ajay Sharma as Shambhuya, a pirate.
- Raja Chaudhary as Dimdima
- Mahesh Raja as Lakhanna
- Aliraza Namdar as Matrubhasha Gupt
- Abhishek Rawat as Kalluri Dinkar
- Raman Thukral as Child Tenali Rama
- Bikramjeet Kanwarpal as King Dhananjay Mudriya
- Amit Dolawat as Bala
- Reema Vohra as Charulata
- Minissha Lamba as Chandrakala, a Vishakanya.
- Monica Castelino as Kalavati
- Mahi sharma as Manjeet
- Tarakesh Chauhan as Acharya Chakrapani
- Raju Pandit as Dharmapala of Kotte
- Madhura Naik as Queen Munmun
- Shahbaz Khan as Babur
- Mukesh Tripathi as Wazir Malik
- Rupali Bhosale as Maya, Mohini's sister.
- Sooraj Thapar as Prataparudra Deva, Orissa's King.
- Haelyn Shastri as Varlaxmi, a friend and neighbour of Sharada.
- Urvashi S Sharma / Poonam Rajput as Princess Jaganmohini, Gajpati Pratap Rudra Dev's Daughter.
- Piyali Munshi as Bhajani Devi / Sajani as Chandrakala (s2)
- Deepak Qazir as Annacharya, Tathacharya and Ananta Lakshmi's elder brother.
- Bhavesh Balchandani / Amit Mistry as Birbal
- Bhupinder Singh as Shaitan
- Saud Mansuri as Yudhveer
- Aishwarya Raj Bhakuni as Sugandha, King Krishnadevaraya's assumed sister Bhanumati's niece.
- Athar Siddiqui as Chandrelu
- Mehmood Junior as Nasreddin
- Shoaib Ali as Kamaal-e-Mustafa, the Prince of Tehran.
- Vijay Baldani as Siddhsen
- Ssumier S Pasricha as Sheikh Chilli
- Kajal Jain as Chitrangada
- Kapil Arya as Achyuta Deva raaya
- Hridyansh Shekhawat as Somu / Krodh
- Heena Rajput as Timmarasu's wife.
- Jahaan Arora as a Magician.
- Patrali Chattopdhyay as Hanchhi, Chinese businesswoman.
- Pratima Rasaily as Khashi, Chinese businesswoman.
- Puneet Vashisht as Daku
- Rati Pandey as Princess Devyani
- Bhavin Bhanushali as Mirza Liyaqat Ali, Humayun's son.
- Iqbal Azad as Humayun
- Manish Bishla as King Durjan
- Naveen Pandita as Akbar
- Nimesh Soni as Vaidya Gopal krishnan
- Satyajit Gaonkar as King of Him Dong
- Pradeep Gurang as King of Him Dong assistant.
- Nirisha Basnett as King of Him Dong advisor and secretary.
- Krutika Desai as Radha, the fraud Devi Maa.
- Riney Aryaa as Rukmani
- Sailesh Gulabani as Vengdu Swami, a magician with hypnotising skills and Tathacharya's friend.
- Vinay Rohrra as Abdullah, the storyteller.
- Visha Vira as Abdullah's wife.
- Raja Chaudhary as Chowdappa Raya (s2 ), emperor of Keladi ( not Keezhadi in Tamil Nadu )
- Rajesh Dubey as Achambha tribhuti, (s2)
- Priya Shinde as Rajkumaari Vasudha (s2)
- Hemant Bharati as Senapati Sevappa (s2)
- Romil Chaudhary as Fake Govinda devaraaya (s2)
- Ankit Bharadwaj as Anantaiyaa (s2)
- Mrunali Shirke as Dharani (s2)
- Garima Jain as Rajkumaari Madhumati (s2)
- Aliraza Namdar as Bhaukaal Maharaj ( s2 )
- Pankaj Vishnu as Acharya Devomay (s2)
- Vinayak Bhave as Acharya Bhaskar (s2)
- Priyanshu Singh as Singharaju (s2)

== Production ==
Regarding the series Tenali Rama, Neeraj Vyas, Senior EVP & Head, Channel SAB and MAX cluster of channels, said, "India has a compelling tradition of both written and oral folklore. Our epics are treasures that teach life lessons via stories. Tenali Rama was a legendary poet of the 15th century. He is immortal, his wit being admired even in today's times. With Tenali Rama's adaptation on SAB, we intend to offer a restored and renewed version of this classic chronicle."

=== Casting ===
Krishna Bharadwaj was chosen to play the titular role of Tenali Rama and went bald for it. Speaking on how he got the role, he said,

"I have been waiting for something good to come my way. When I received a call for Tenali Rama, I was shocked to be informed that I would have to go bald. But then I decided to give it a try, and it all fell into places. I feel there has been a divine force blessing me for I have managed to sink my teeth into the character so well. I did not do any research nor read about it but I can assure I am doing a good job, even though I do not consider myself so capable. As for the baldness, the first day, I was really upset but now I see Tenali in the mirror and not Krishna, and that takes away the blues."

It was reported in June 2017 that Manav Gohil had been cast to play the pivotal role of Krishnadevaraya. Gohil, who worked with SAB TV on Yam Hain Hum, where he played the titular role, said, "This time it's Krishnadevaraya, a very powerful king that I am portraying. It's a comedy show and I am looking forward to working with a new set of people. The show is "Tenali Rama" and I am so ready to get rolling with this one."

Veteran actor Pankaj Berry was cast to play the series' antagonist and Tenali Rama's foe frenemy, Tathacharya, who is the royal priest in the court of Emperor Krishnadevaraya, and always creates trouble for Tenali Rama with the help of his fellow disciples, Dhani and Mani. Berry said, "I am very excited to play Tathacharya. It is a very different kind of challenging role, there are different layers to the character even though it's a negative character." It was reported in July 2017 that Sonia Sharma and Priyanka Singh had been cast to play the roles of Krishnadevaraya's wives, Chinna Devi and Tirumalamba, respectively.

=== Revival ===
In October 2024, It was announced that a sequel to Tenali Rama was in development. On 30 October 2024, first promo was released of Tenali Rama's sequel on the occasion of Diwali. It confirmed that Pankaj Berry, Sohit Soni and Sanjay Mangani would reprise their roles as Tattacharya, Mani and Dhani respectively. It premiered on Sony Sab on 16 December 2024.

== Awards and nominations ==
Year	Award	Category	Recipient	Result
2017	Indian Television Academy Awards	Best Actor in a Negative Role	Pankaj Berry	Nominated
2018	Indian Television Academy Awards	Best Children's Program	Tenali Rama	Won
2018	Indian Television Academy Awards	Best Actress in a Comic Role	Nimisha Vakharia	Nominated
2019	Indian Television Academy Awards	Best Actor in a Supporting Role	Manav Gohil	Nominated
2019	Indian Telly Awards	Best Actor in a Comic Role	Pankaj Berry	Nominated
2019	Indian Telly Awards	Best Child Actor	Krish Parekh	Won

== Historical inaccuracies ==
The series portrays Chinna Devi as Krishnadevaraya's senior wife and chief queen and Tirumalamba as his junior wife. This is inaccurate. Tirumalamba (also known as Tirumala Devi) was actually Krishnadevaraya's senior wife and his chief queen or patta mahishi. She was the princess of Srirangapattana and Krishnadevaraya had married her most probably in 1498, long before his accession to the throne in 1509. Chinna Devi was actually a Royal Dancer whom Krishnadevaraya had married immediately after birth of his first daughter in 1502.

== Reception ==
Shweta Keshri of India Today gave the series a positive review, praising Krishna Bharadwaj's portrayal of Tenali Rama, the VFX and special effects of the series, the colourful sets and comic content which "can easily lure viewers to the show and takes you back to the 16th century."

== Broadcast ==
Tenali Rama was dubbed and aired in Tamil on Zee Tamil under the title Thenali Raaman. Later, it was dubbed and aired in Telugu on Zee Telugu as Vikata Kavi Thenali Ramakrishna. It was also dubbed in Malayalam and aired on Zee Keralam as Thenaali Raman. It was also dubbed in Kannada and aired on Dangal Kannada as Tenali Rama.

== See also ==
- Tenali Ramakrishna
- The Adventures of Tenali Raman
- Tenali Ramakrishna (film)
