= Preminchukunnam Pelliki Randi =

2004 Indian Telugu-language romantic drama film

- DVD cover
- Directed by: Relangi Narasimha Rao
- Written by: Sankaramanchi Parthasarathi (dialogues)
- Screenplay by: Relangi Narasimha Rao
- Story by: Relangi Kiran
- Starring: Aditya Om; Rekha; Vijay Sai; Revathi
- Cinematography: V Jayaram
- Music by: Koti
- Production company: Nithya Movies
- Release date: 22 April 2004
- Country: India
- Language: Telugu

Preminchukunnam Pelliki Randi (transl. We fell in love, come to the wedding) is a 2004 Indian Telugu-language romantic drama film directed by Relangi Narasimha Rao and starring Aditya Om, Rekha, Vijay Sai and newcomer Revathy. This marks the return of the director after a gap of three years.

== Cast ==
- Aditya Om as Aditya
- Rekha as Swapna
- Vijay Sai as Vijay
- Revathi as Sundari
- Jeeva
- M. S. Narayana
- Brahmanandam
- Ali
- Raghu Babu
- Mallikarjuna Rao
- Venu Madhav
- AVS
- Krishna Bhagavaan
- Jenny
- Telangana Shakuntala as Kanthamma

== Soundtrack ==
The soundtrack was composed by Koti.

Track listing
No.	Title	Lyrics	Singer(s)	Length
1.	"Bollywoodlo"	Bhuvana Chandra	Ranjith, Malathi	4:41
2.	"Gopilola"	Vanamali	Murali, Sunitha Upadrashta	4:03
3.	"Pacchagaddi"	Bhaskarabhatla	Raghu Kunche, Kousalya	4:28
4.	"Sirimallela"	Sai Sri Harsha	Sriram Prabhu, Usha	3:40
5.	"Vayasey Vareva"	Tanikella Bharani	Murali, Radhika	3:21
Total length:				20:13

== Reception ==
Jeevi of Idlebrain.com wrote that "The best thing about this film is that it is a clean comedy film. The comedy in Telugu films has transformed as the generations passed by. The comedy in present day's films is very much fast and quirky compared to that of Preminchukundam Pelliki Randi". Telugucinema.com wrote "As a comedy, there are plenty of incongruities. But the humor in dialogs fails to keep up with the situation. What little is there didn’t quite fit in. Though Brahmanandam just disappears as his dead body is taken around in a procession, that can be laughed away as just comedy. In the midst of ridiculous love stories, Preminchukunnam… comes off as something better".
