= Tulika Publishers =

- Status: Active
- Founded: 1996
- Founder: Radhika Menon
- Headquarters location: Chennai, Tamil Nadu, India
- Key people: Jaya Madhavan, Githa Hariharan, Suchitra Ramadurai
- No. of employees: 50-99
- Official website: http://www.tulikabooks.com

Tulika Publishers is a South Indian Multi-lingual Children's Books publishing house. It often uses the imprint Tulika Books, but is separate from the New Delhi–based publisher Tulika Books.

== History ==
Tulika was founded in 1996 as an independent publishing house by Radhika Menon. Menon and Indu Chandrasekhar ran a pre-press service called Tulika to "earn enough money" to publish their own books. Subsequently, Chandrasekhar founded Tulika Books in New Delhi in 1995, and Menon founded Tulika Publishers in Chennai.

The genre of Tulika Publishers is children's literature and illustrations.

== Select publications ==
Award Winning Publications
Title	Author	Illustrators	Language(s)	Notes
Vaalameenukkum Vilaangameenukkum Kalyanam	‘Gaana’ Ulaganathan	Amrithalingam	Tamil	Was adapted for Tamil film Chitiram Pesuthadi
Bawre Beej	Vishaka Chanchani	Angeline Pradhan, Upesh Pradhan	Hindi	
Sunu-Sunu Snail – Storm in the Garden		Ashok Rajagopalan	Tamil, English	
Thakitta Tharikitta Bouncing Ball	Jacob Samson Mutthada	Ashok Rajagopalan	Tamil, English	NCERT National Award
Dancing Bees, Grandma’s Eyes	Graphic Novel	Ashok Rajagopalan	Tamil, English	
Gasa Gasa Para Para	Jeeva Raghunath	Ashok Rajagopalan	Tamil, English	
The Runaway Peppercorn	Suchitra Ramadurai	Ashok Rajagopalan	Tamil, English	Commonwealth Short Story Competition 2003-2004
Birdywood Buzz the vulture returns	Shamim Padamsee	Ashok Rajagopalan	Tamil, English	
Dosa		Ashok Rajagopalan	Tamil, English	
Basava and the Dots of Fire	Radhika Chadha	Bhakthi Pathak	English	
Malu Bhalu	Kamla Bhasin	Bindia Thapar	Hindi	
My Friends in the City	Samina Mishra	Biswajit Balasubramaniam	English, Hindi	
The Forbidden Temple	T V Padma	Bhavana Vyas	English	Korean rights for the second book (Mathematwist) have been sold.
Norbu’s New Shoes		Chewang Dorjee Bhutia	English	
Who will be Ningthou?	Indira Mukherjee	Chinmayie	English	
The Neverending Story	Ashwini Bhat	A V Ilango	English	
Gadagada Gudugudu	Jeeva Raghunath	Jeyanthi Manokaran	Tamil	UNESCO Illustrations Award
Busy Busy Grand Aunt		Kanchan Mitra	English	
Avneet Aunty’s Mobile Phone		Kavita Singh Kale	English	
Pavo and Cavo	Nirupama Raghavan	Kavita Singh Kale	English	
Brahma's Butterfly	Graphic Novel	Kavita Singh Kale	English	
Jalebi Curls	Niveditha Subramaniam	Kavita Singh Kale	English	
Hiss, Don't Bite!		Mugdha Sethi	English	Style of Kalighat Paintings
Eyes on the Peacock’s Tail		Mugdha Sethi	English	Style of Phad Paintings
Magic Vessels		Mugdha Sethi	English	Research based on Tamil Nadu Clay Sculptures
A Curly Tale		Mugdha Sethi	English	Style of Madhubani Paintings
Malli	Jeeva Raghunath	Nancy Raj	English, Tamil	
The Village Fair	Radhika Meganathan	Nancy Raj	English, Tamil	
Aa Vilurundu Akku Varai	Jeeva Raghunath	Nancy Raj	English, Tamil	
Mukund and Riaz		Nina Sabnani	English, French	Deux Amis, its French edition, was launched by Syros at the a Paris Book fair in March 2007.
My Mother's Sari	Sandhya Rao	Nina Sabnani	English, French	Outstanding International Book awardee, 2007 (USA)
Kabir The Weaver Poet	Bindhumalini Narayanswamy	Jaya Madhavan	English	
Sorry, Best Friend!	Githa Hariharan, Shama Futehally	Nina Sabnani	English, French	Outstanding International Book awardee, 2007 (USA)
