= Horror Story (film) =

- Theatrical release poster
- Directed by: Ayush Raina
- Written by: Vikram Bhatt; Mohan Azad; Sukhmani Sadana (dialogues)
- Produced by: ASA Productions and Enterprises Pvt. Ltd.
- Starring: Karan Kundra; Radhika Menon; Nishant Singh Malkani; Ravish Desai; Hasan Zaidi; Aparna Bajpai; Nandini Vaid; Sheetal Singh
- Cinematography: Gargey trivedi
- Edited by: Kuldip Mehan
- Music by: Amar Mohile
- Production companies: ASA Production and Enterprises Pvt Ltd.
- Distributed by: ASA Productions and Enterprises Pvt. Ltd.
- Release date: 13 September 2013
- Running time: 90 minutes
- Country: India
- Language: Hindi
- Budget: ₹6 crore
- Box office: est. ₹7 crore

Horror Story is a 2013 Indian Hindi-language horror thriller film written by Vikram Bhatt and directed by Ayush Raina. The film stars Ravish Desai and Hasan Zaidi, and is the Bollywood debut of noted television actors Nishant Malkani and Karan Kundra. The film was released on 13 September 2013. The plot revolves around a night spent by seven youngsters at a haunted hotel. The film received positive reviews but failed at the box office.

== Plot ==
Vikrant Nerula enters alone the deserted Grandiose Hotel. He proceeds to Room 3046 and commits suicide by jumping off the terrace.

Seven friends, Sam (Samraat), Maghhesh, Achint, Neel, Nina, Sonia, and Maggie, reunite in a local pub after several years to celebrate the farewell of Neel, who is going abroad. They learn about the abandoned hotel. Rumours state that the hotel owner was pushed into suicide by the ghost of an asylum inmate. They decide to visit the hotel for adventure.

They try to enter the hotel through the main door, but they enter through the back door as it is locked. Nina observes strange phenomena, but Neel brushes her claims aside. They find a TV set on with no transmission or power. Following this, Achint and Neel hear a voice saying, "WELCOME TO DIE." Ignoring it as a hallucination, they proceed to Room 3046, where Sam is killed. The group flees in panic and realises that they are trapped inside the hotel with no way out. Achint and Maghhesh go to the terrace to try and find a mobile signal, but a spirit kills Maghhesh.

A woman's ghost then terrorises the group, which drags Sonia into darkness. With three people dead, the remaining four find an abandoned Jeep which they use to try to get out of the hotel amidst ghostly apparitions. After a drive through misty areas, the group escapes, only to find that they are back at the door of Room 3046. They realise that the only way to escape is to survive until dawn.

However, Sonia soon confronts them, whom Achint and Neel think is the ghost, but a tearful Sonia tells them that it is really her. The group learns that when the hotel was a mental asylum, a possessed girl named Maya was admitted after she murdered her entire family. Maya would always claim to have 'married the devil' and become very violent at the hospital, even killing the doctors and causing the fire that broke out and killed all the inmates. The group thus realises that it is Maya who is haunting them.

Sonia attempts to contact Maya to find out what she wants. She receives a call from Maya, who says she wants to kill them all and nothing else. Afterwards, Maya's spirit kills Sonia. Nina asks the time from Neel, only to be told that it is the same time (3:55 a.m.) she had seen on the clock in one of the rooms shortly after entering the hotel. Believing it is an intuition, they decide to go back to the same room to understand Nina's extrasensory perception.

There they find a book containing paranormal explanations and a way to locate the source of energy of the dark spirits. With the help of incantations from the book, they have visions of the past. They find that the source of energy for Maya's spirit is in a shock machine. They decide to burn it down to end the horror.

Neel and Maggie go to the kitchen in search of something flammable. Maggie sees a female spirit sitting on a chair and reading a newspaper. Afterwards, Maya's spirit, appearing in the form of Neel, kills Maggie. Achint is beheaded by the spirit, leaving only Neel and Nina alive.

Neel tries to burn the machine, but the spirit pulls him into a closet. The spirit starts terrorizing Nina. Nina starts a fire. Amidst ghostly apparitions and obstructions, and with the help of the spirit of Vikrant Narula (the previous owner of the hotel), she manages to burn the machine, destroying Maya's spirit. The film ends with the entrance doors of the hotel opening at dawn and a traumatized Nina, the only survivor, walking outside.

== Cast ==
- Karan Kundra as Neel
- Nishant Singh Malkani as Achint
- Ravish Desai as Magesh
- Hasan Zaidi as Samraat "Sam"
- Aparna Bajpai as Maggie
- Nandini Vaid as Sonia
- Sheetal Singh as Maya
- Bikramjeet Kanwarpal as Vikrant Narula
- Radhika Menon as Nina

== Production ==
Of the film, Bhatt has stated that he did not want Horror Story to contain any songs or sex scenes. He also remarked that he wanted to avoid casting "big stars" in the film, as he believed that they "cannot turn the audience fearful" in what he termed a "hardcore horror film". Ravish Desai has commented that the movie will be the first in a franchise and that planning for further films has already begun.

Bhatt had earlier made films in the same genre, namely 1920, 1920: Evil Returns and Haunted. In an interview, he commented, "While [my] Raaz 3 and 1920 were romantic sagas with songs and full-on drama, this one is more of a Hollywood kind of drama. The horror lies in the story."

== See also ==
- List of Indian horror films
