= Seetha Doraiswamy =

Kalaimamani Seetha Iyer Doraiswamy
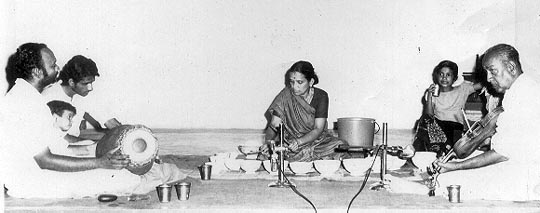
- Doraiswamy at an All India Radio recording (c. 1950)

Background information
- Born: G. Seethalakshmi; 27 January 1926; Adachani, Tirunelveli District, Madras Presidency, British India
- Origin: India
- Died: 14 March 2013 (aged 87)
- Genre: Indian classical music
- Occupation: Classical instrumentalist
- Instrument: Jal tarang
- Years active: 1937– 2013
- Label: HMV

Seethamma Doraiswamy ("Seetha Amma Doraiswamy") or Seetha Doraiswamy (Tamil: சீதா துரைசாமி, sītā turAisvāMī 27 January 1926 – 14 March 2013), was a renowned Carnatic multi-instrumentalist. She was the last recognised female exponent of a dying Indian instrument, the jal tarang. She was the first (and till date youngest) female musician ever to be awarded the Gold Medal of Honour from The Music Academy, the first Carnatic music Institute. She is the only Jal Tarang exponent to have ever received the Kalaimamani award by Government of Tamil Nadu, in 2001, with the citation reading "(Seetha) has tirelessly worked to prevent the jalatharangam from becoming extinct and is often recognized only for that; it is time to bring to notice the fact that she championed the cause of equal female representation during a time where our cultural norms may have not."

== Biography ==
=== Early years ===
Seetha or Seethamma ("Amma" being a respectful suffix used for south Indian ladies) was born in Adachani, a village in Tirunelveli District of present-day Tamil Nadu (then the Madras Presidency) into a Tamil-speaking Brahmin family, the daughter of Pumpu Ganapathy Iyer and his wife Meenakshi Amma.

Under encouragement of her parents, the young Seetha started learning Carnatic music at an early age locally from Kodaganallur Subbiah Bhagavatar and later under Gottuvadhyam vidhwan Seetharama Bhagavatar. After receiving an acceptance letter despite being 10 years old to become a member of the first Music Department established in Tamil Nadu by Prof. P. Sambamoorthy, Seetha moved to Chennai in 1937 and trained alongside D. K. Pattammal where she became the first female recipient of the Gold Medal of Honour. She still holds the record of being the youngest recipient of the award.

She was married at the age of 14. Her husband, who understood her yearning to continue with her music lessons, encouraged her to enrol for a course conducted by the Music Academy. She completed the course under Valadi Krishnaiyer who played a pivotal role in her music development. She was top of the class in her batch and she won a Gold Medal.

She is the grandmother of author Jaya Madhavan, musician Bindhumalini Narayanswamy, and musician Ganavya Doraiswamy.

=== Jal Tarang Training ===
Students who excelled in the theoretical aspect of Carnatic music were given the choice to learn either the gottuvadhyam or the jal tarang at the Academy. When asked why she inclined towards the jal tarang, Seetha answered that she "was only ten then, and the dishes used by jalatarangam artistes reminded me of the miniature vessels children use when they play 'house.' Striking dishes containing water seemed a lot of fun". The teacher charged with the task of teaching the jal tarang, Ramaniah Chettiar, was not convinced that any of the students at the Academy were intelligent enough to pick up the instrument. Under the urging of Prof. Sambamoorthy, he entertained Seetha's request and put her to a test by tuning the instrument to Sankarabharanam and asked her to set it to Mayamalavagowla. After successfully tuning it, Seetha was given the opportunity to begin training. She learnt under the tutelage of Prof. Sambamoorthy and Ramaniah Chettiar for one and half months, and was told that her knowledge of theory would suffice in complementing her training for the rest of her career. Recognizing her financial position, Prof. P. Sambamoorthy bought Seetha her first set of jal tarang cups.

== Career ==
She tirelessly worked to prevent the Jal Tarang from being extinct and is often recognized for that. Although her training began at a young age, familial obligations prevented her from performing. Seetha was married at age 14 to N. Doraiswamy and gave birth to 10 children. The death of a prodigious son left her shattered, and it was under the encouragement of her family that she began to perform again at the age of 41. Citing this particular circumstance, she is often referred to and has received awards as a pioneer female Indian musician for having been one of the few who performed despite the social connotations that prevented her colleagues from doing so.

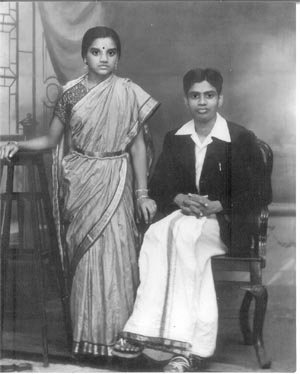
Seetha Doraiswamy (left) with N. Doraiswamy c.a. 1938

=== Awards and honours ===
Musician
Year	Award	Notes
1983	Aasthaana Vidhwaan	Award from Kanchi matha as resident Musician
1939	Gold Medal	First female recipient of Award from Madras Music Academy
2009	TTK Award	The Music Academy's Special TTK Award
2001	Kalaimamani	Fourth highest Government Civilian award in India
1999	Jalatarangam Vidushi	Awarded by Ramakrishna Mission
