= Jaya Madhavan =

Indian illustrator and writer (born 1972)

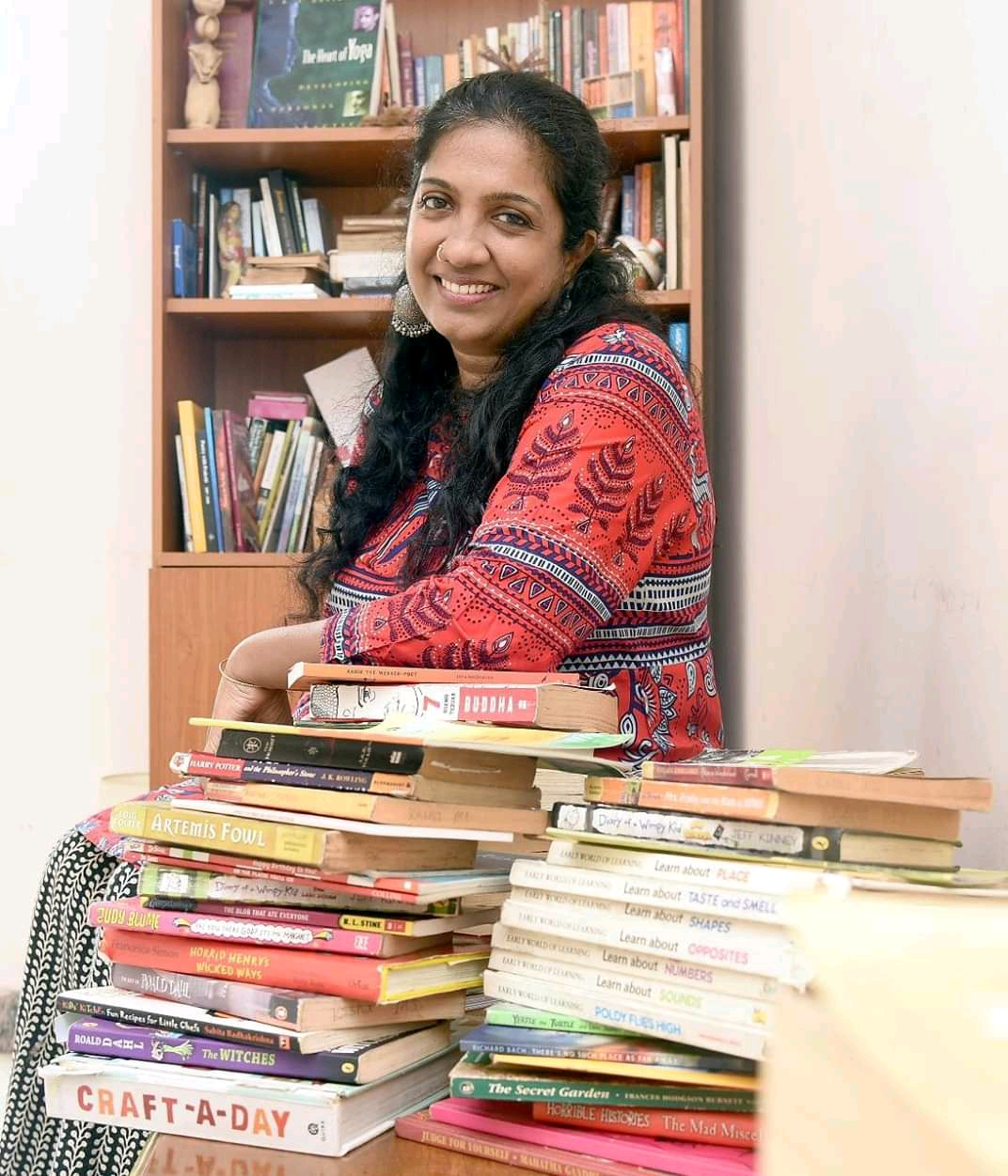
- Born: 1 October 1972 (age 54); Madras, Tamil Nadu, India
- Occupation: Author
- Writing career
- Period: 1998-present
- Genres: Novelist, comic creator, columnist, poet
- Notable works: Kabir The Weaver Poet, Sita and the Forest Bandits, Loony Life
- Website: jayamadhavan.blogspot.com

Jaya Madhavan (born 1 October 1972) is an Indian author, poet, The New Indian Express columnist, and comic creator. She is a winner of The Children's Book Trust All India Competition for Writers of Children's Books.

== Biography ==
Jaya Madhavan was born in Chennai, India. She studied at Kendriya Vidyalaya (KVCLRI) and studied literature at Queen Marys College Chennai. She is an alumnus of Jawaharlal Nehru University (JNU), New Delhi and completed her MA in English literature in 1994. She is an M.Phil. Degree holder from University of Madras. Jaya is a certified yoga instructor from Krishnamacharya Yoga Mandiram and a mental health professional by qualification and practice. She is a visiting faculty at the prestigious National Institute of Design, Ahmedabad and Bangalore. Jaya (also known as Neelayathakshi Jaya) currently lives in Chennai with her two children, and is the granddaughter of Seetha Doraiswamy.

== Work ==
Jaya is a YA fiction writer, poet, and columnist. Her first novel, Sita and the Forest Bandits, was awarded the first prize in the Children Book Trust's All India Competition for Writers of Children's Books in 2001 and was subsequently published by Children's Book Trust, New Delhi. Jaya's retelling of a folk tale was awarded in the folk tale category and included in the Golden Treasury of short stories published by the Children's Book Trust. One of her short articles published in The Hindu has been included in the NCERT English textbook with permission.

Her second book for young adults, Kabir The Weaver Poet, is a research backed novel reaching the Top 15 reading list for young adults and was published by Tulika Publications in 2006. Kabir, The Weaver-Poet was born of a two-year research of Kabir's songs and dohas. The book and is a YA fiction that was selected by the CBSE as part of its curriculum. It has been selected among the 15 top YA fiction for age 12–21.

To share the spirit of Kabir, Jaya, along with her two sisters, performed Akath Kahani, a unique immersive song-spoken word-dance presentation that won rave reviews. It was showcased on many stages including Prithvi theatre as part of Kabir festival in Mumbai, Sufi festival in Orissa, Auroville Kabir festival, and other parts of India. Jaya was invited to speak at the 8th edition of Kala Ghoda festival in Mumbai.

Jaya ran a weekly humour column called "Loony Life" for The New Indian Express and a fortnightly Antidep comic strip (created along with her sister) for The New Indian Express's Saturday Zeitgeist feature.

Jaya's third novel, Sita and the twin ghosts, was published as a year long series by Gokulam Children's magazine, which Jaya illustrated herself.

Jaya's poems have been published by Unisun in their anthologies (The Peacock's Cry, I, me, myself, Timescapes, Mosaic etc.), Muse India and the South Asian Literary Journal. Two of her published poems were selected to be translated into Croatian and published in the book Afternoon showers: an Anthology of Modern Indian Women Writers brought out by the Croatian Ministry of Culture. Fifty Indian women poets were chosen for this anthology and Jaya among them.

Jaya's short stories for children have regularly appeared in Chatterbox children's magazine, Gokulam children's magazine, The Hindu's Young World, Children Book Trust's collection of short stories, and Unisun's collection of short stories. Her short story for adults, ‘The Monarch butterfly’, won the second prize in British Council-Unisun's national competition for writers of short stories 2005, and was selected by Shashi Deshpande for the collection title Winners, published by Unisun, Bangalore. Her short stories "Curse of the bird" and the "Other brother" was also showcased in the collection of paranormal stories published by Unisun, Bangalore titled Curse of the bird. The collection was named after Jaya's story that appeared in the collection. Jaya also won the second prize for her children's story ‘Siddharth becomes a big brother’ which was subsequently published in Unisun's collection of short stories for children titled Monsters under the bed and other stories.

Jaya's articles have appeared in The Hindu, The Hindu's literary review, The Hindu's World of Women special supplement, The New Indian Express, the Sunday Express and the Times of India, Outlook Traveller.

== Select bibliography ==
- Sita and the Forest Bandits, CBT, ISBN 9788170119777
- Kabir The Weaver-Poet, Tulika books, ISBN 9788181461681
- The Peacock's Cry, Unisun Anthologies, ISBN 9788188234233
- The curse of the bird and other paranormal stories, Unisun Publications, 2009, ISBN 9788188234547
- Winners, Unisun Publications, 2005, ISBN 9788188234110
