= Natho Nenu =

2023 Indian film

- Poster
- Directed by: Santhi Kumar Turlapati
- Produced by: Prashanth Tanguturi
- Starring: P. Sai Kumar; Srinivas Sai; Aditya Om; Deepali Rajput; Aishwarya Vullingala
- Cinematography: S.Murali Mohan Reddy
- Edited by: Nandamuri Hari
- Music by: Satya Kashyap; S. Chinna (score)
- Production company: Sri Bhavnesh Productions
- Release date: 21 July 2023
- Country: India
- Language: Telugu

Natho Nenu is a 2023 Indian Telugu-language film directed by Santhi Kumar Turlapati. The film stars P. Sai Kumar, Srinivas Sai, Aditya Om, Deepali Rajput, and Aishwarya Vullingala. The movie was released theatrically worldwide on 21 July 2023.

== Plot ==
Koteswara Rao, a 60 years old guy who is extremely wealthy and single, spends his days in Hyderabad's real estate market. He keeps advancing steadily and constructing residences with cutting-edge amenities.

== Cast ==
- P. Sai Kumar as Koteswara Rao
- Srinivas Sai as Kotigadu (20 years old)
- Aditya Om as Kotigadu (40 years old)
- Deepali Rajput as Nagalakshi
- Aishwarya Vullingala as Deepa
- Vijayachander
- Rajeev Kanakala
- Sameer
- C. V. L. Narasimha Rao
- Gautam Raju
- M. S. Chowdary
- Bhadram
- Suman Setty

== Soundtrack ==
Natho Nenu

Soundtrack album by Sathya Kashyap
- Released: 2023
- Recorded: 2023
- Genre: Feature film soundtrack
- Language: Telugu
- Label: Tips Industries
- Producer: Sathya Kashyap

All music is composed by Sathya Kashyap.

Tracklist
| No. | Title | Lyrics | Singer(s) | Length |
|---|---|---|---|---|
| 1. | "Osinee Vayyari Ram Silaka" | Ramajogayya Sastry | Javed Ali | 3:22 |
| 2. | "Jathaga Neetho" | Santhi Kumar Turlapati | Karthik, Divya Maalika | 4:00 |
| 3. | "Rajampeta Ranini " | Santhi Kumar Turlapati | Geetha Madhuri | 3:57 |

== Reception ==
A critic from The Hans India wrote that "On a whole, Natho Nenu entertains audiences from all genres". A critic from Sakshi Post wrote that "Natho Nenu is a decent entertainer with a beautiful message. Natho Nenu is a message-oriented film".
