= Dhanalakshmi I Love You =

Dhanalakshmi... I Love You
- DVD Cover
- Directed by: Siva Nageswara Rao
- Written by: Ravi Kolikipudi (dialogues)
- Screenplay by: Siva Nageswara Rao
- Produced by: B Satyanarayana
- Starring: Allari Naresh; Aditya Om; Naresh; Ankitha
- Cinematography: Rajendra Prasad K.
- Edited by: Shankar
- Music by: Chakri
- Production company: Satyam Entertainments
- Release date: 18 October 2002
- Country: India
- Language: Telugu

Dhanalakshmi I Love You is a 2002 Indian Telugu-language comedy film directed by Siva Nageswara Rao and starring Allari Naresh, Aditya Om, Naresh, and Ankitha. The film is a remake of the 2000 Hindi film Hera Pheri by Priyadarshan which itself was based on Siddique–Lal's 1989 Malayalam film Ramji Rao Speaking.

== Cast ==
- Allari Naresh as Raju
- Aditya Om as Shyam
- Naresh as Babu Rao
- Ankitha as Dhanalakshmi
- Sony Raj
- M. Balayya as Devi Prasad
- Banerjee as Kabeera
- Tanikella Bharani as Babu Nayak
- Suman Setty
- Dharmavarapu Subramanyam as the bank manager
- Ahuti Prasad as Prakash
- Kondavalasa Lakshmana Rao
- Mannava Balayya

== Production ==
Kota Srinivasa Rao was initially cast for Paresh Rawal's role in the original before Naresh was cast.

== Soundtrack ==
The soundtrack was composed by Chakri.

No.	Title	Singer(s)	Length
1.	"Oho Kanna"	Gowri Srinivas, Smitha	4:38
2.	"Kokkokkomali"	Udit Narayan, Kousalya	4:06
3.	"Ossamari"	Ravi Verma, Matin	4:44
4.	"Okariki Okarai"	Smt Mani Sastry, Nihal, Srirangam Venu	5:15
5.	"Rupai"	Zilla Venkatanarayana	3:13
6.	"Yemayyindo"	Ravi Verma, Sudha	4:38
7.	"Prema"	Ranjith	4:45
8.	"Don't Worry"	Chakri	4:10

== Release and reception ==
The film released on 18 October 2002. Gudipoodi Srihari of The Hindu opined that "Histrionically speaking, it is the senior Naresh who steals the limelight, with a peculiar make-up given to his role of Babu Rao". Jeevi of Idlebrain.com gave the film a rating of 2.75/5 and said that "The movie looks very artificial except a few scenes where the love of Naresh towards his mother is projected".
