= Sohit Soni =

Indian actor

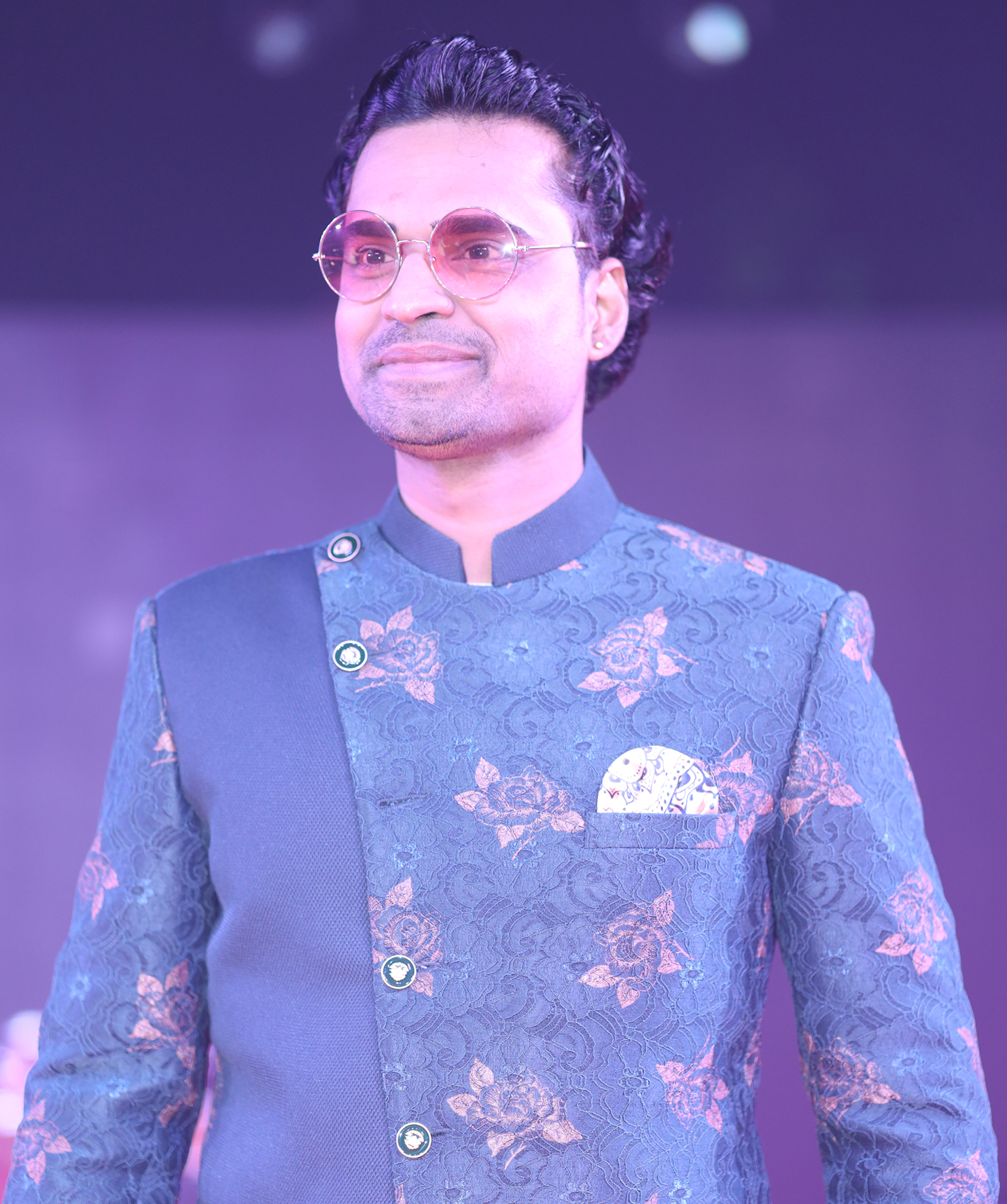
- Sohit Soni on the set in 2021
- Born: Sohit Vijay Soni
- Occupations: Actor; comedian; anchor; writer

Sohit Vijay Soni is an Indian television actor, comedian, anchor and concept writer who has appeared in TV shows including Tenali Rama, Bhabiji Ghar Par Hain!, Dahleez, Jijaji Chhat Per Hain and Tu Mera Hero.

== Early life and career ==
Soni hails from Faridabad and he lives in Mumbai.

He started his career with a television serial called Tu Mera Hero. As Funny Character Name was Hero This serial aired on Star Plus from 2015. After this he got work in many major serials, including Tenali Rama, Bhabiji Ghar Par Hain!, Jijaji Chhat Per Hain, May I Come In Madam?. He also did a podcast with Ashish Singh Rudhra.

== Filmography ==
=== Films and webseries ===
Name	Role	Year
Maassab	Nanhey	2021
Chotte Ustaad	Billu	TBA
Inspector Avinash	Pappu	2021

=== Television ===
Year	Name	Role
2015	Tu Mera Hero	Hero
2016–2023	Bhabhi Ji Ghar Par Hai!	Various Characters
2016	Dahleez	Nawaz
2016–2017	May I Come In Madam?	Various Characters
2017	Y.A.R.O Ka Tashan	Advocate
2017	Hoshiyar… Sahi Waqt, Sahi Kadam	Acid man
2017	Bhaag Bakool Bhaag	Ghanta Panwala
2017–2020 ; 2024-2025	Tenali Rama	Mani
2018	Jijaji Chhat Per Hain	Various characters
2019	Happu Ki Ultan Paltan	Raj
2019	Shaadi Ke Siyape	Rajesh Dulha
2021	Jijaji Chhat Parr Koii Hai	Constable Rathi
