= Ankitha =

Indian actress

Ankita Jhaveri
- Born: Ankita Jhaveri; 27 May; Breach Candy, Mumbai, India
- Occupation: Actress
- Years active: 1984; 2002–2018
- Spouse: Vishal Jagtap (m. 2016)

Ankita Jhaveri is a former Indian actress, who has worked primarily in Telugu cinema along with some Tamil and Kannada films.

== Personal life ==
In March 2016, Ankita married Vishal Jagtap, a Mumbai-based businessman in New Jersey, who is VP of applications at Citibank.

== Career ==
Ankitha started her career as a child actor in 1984 in an advertising campaign for Rasna on Indian national TV and was known as the "Rasna baby" as a child actor. Her breakthrough in films came with Simhadri starring NTR Jr. In 2005, she appeared in back-to-back Tamil films directed by Sundar C, featuring alongside Prashanth in London and then in Thaka Thimi Tha with newcomer Yuvakrishna.

== Filmography ==
Year	Film	Role	Language	Notes
2002	Lahiri Lahiri Lahirilo	Priya	Telugu	
2002	Dhanalakshmi, I Love You	Dhanalakshmi	Telugu	
2002	Premalo Pavani Kalyan	Pavani	Telugu	
2003	Sri Ram	Aishwarya	Kannada	
2003	Simhadri	Kasturi	Telugu	
2004	Andaru Dongale Dorikithe	Usha	Telugu	
2004	Vijayendra Varma	Venkatalakshmi	Telugu	
2005	Manasu Maata Vinadhu	Anuradha "Anu"	Telugu	
2005	London	Anjali	Tamil	
2005	Thaka Thimi Tha	Gayathri	Tamil	
2006	Raraju	Sravani	Telugu	
2006	Khatarnak		Telugu	Special appearance
2006	Seetharamudu	Anjali	Telugu	
2007	Thiru Ranga	Shri	Tamil	
2007	Nava Vasantham	Priya	Telugu	
2007	Anasuya	Tulasi	Telugu	
2008	Raja Raja	Sravani	Telugu	
2008	Vinayakudu	Shalini	Telugu	
2009	Tsunami 7x		Telugu	
2009	Police Adhikari		Telugu	
2016	Waiting	Anita	English	Short film
2018	Forced Orphans	Rani	English	
