= Priya Bathija =

Indian television actress

- Occupation: Actor
- Years active: 2007–2019; 2023

Priya Bathija is an Indian television actress who played Afreen Khan in Khwaish. Bathija also appeared as Ganga Walia in Kasamh Se, and in Basera.

She was most recently seen in &TV's Daayan in 2019.

== Personal life ==
Priya Bathija has been married to DJ Kawaljeet but the couple filed for divorce in 2019.

== Television ==
Year	Show	Role
2007–2008	Khwaish	Afreen Khan
2008–2009	Kasamh Se	Ganga Walia
2009	Basera	Nandini Parikh
2010	Baba Aiso Varr Dhoondo	Sudha
2011	Dwarkadheesh - Bhagwaan Shree Krishn	Rukmini
2012	Hum Phir Milenge	Chandni
2012	Haunted Nights	----
2012	Fear Files	Nishad
2013	Chor Chor Super Chor	Neena
2014	The Buddy Project	Maya Malhotra
2014	Ek Boond Ishq	Mannat Agnihotri
2014	Yeh Hai Aashiqui (Episode 75)	Maanini
2014	Ishq Kills (Episode 12)	Priya Rai
2015–2016	Suryaputra Karn	Kunti
2016	CID (4 December 2016)	Shokhi
2018–2019	Daayan	Asha, the daayan
2023	Tere Ishq Mein Ghayal	Mrs. Oberoi
2024	Ranneeti: Balakot & Beyond	Aayesha
