= Manisha Kelkar =

Indian actress

Manisha Ram Kelkar
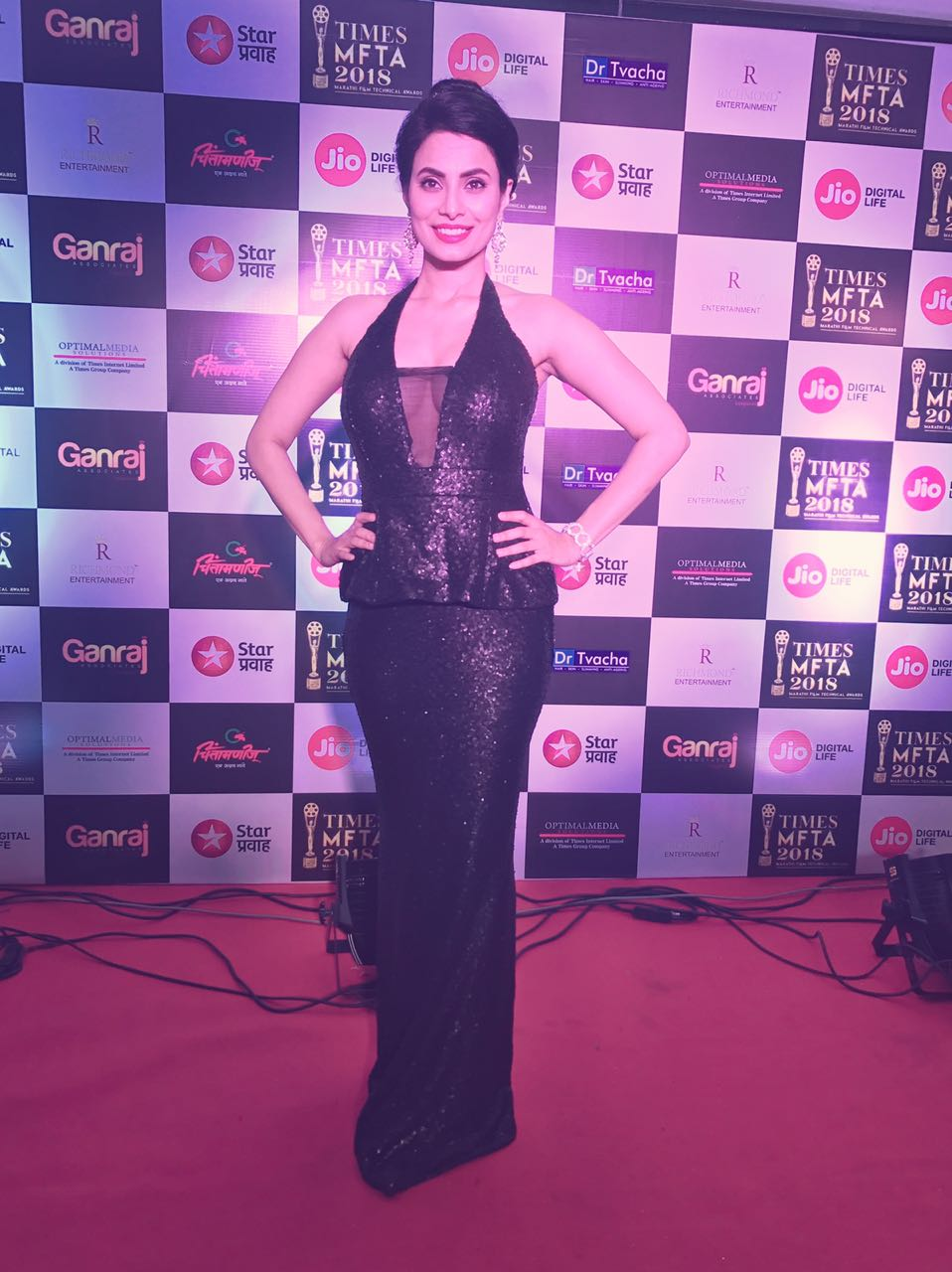
- Born: Mumbai, India
- Occupation: Actress
- Years active: 2007 - Present
- Parent(s): Ram Kelkar (father); Jeevankala (mother)
- Website: http://manisha-kelkar.com/

Manisha Kelkar is an Indian actress. She appears mainly in Hindi and Marathi movies. Kelkar also works as an anchor.

== Early life and education ==
Kelkar was born in Mumbai, the daughter of Ram Kelkar, a screenwriter, and Jeevan Kala, a film actress and dancer. Manisha holds a B.Sc. degree in microbiology and post-graduate degree in filmmaking.

== Career ==
Kelkar made her screen debut in 2007 in the Marathi film Hyancha Kahi Nem Nahi, and has appeared regularly in films since then. Kelkar has also hosted Marathi film awards, Cricket World Cup host on Zee Marathi and other shows. In 2018, she was part of India's first all-women Formula LGB car racing team.

== Filmography ==
=== Films ===
| Year | Movie | Language | Role | Comments |
|---|---|---|---|---|
| 2007 | Hyancha Kahi Nem Nahi | Marathi | - | - |
| 2007 | Ghartyasathi Sar Kahi | Marathi | - | |
| 2008 | Bhola Shankar | Marathi | - | |
| 2009 | Lottery | Hindi | Simran Kapoor | |
| 2010 | Mission Possible | Marathi | Pearl | |
| 2013 | Mazha Mee | Marathi | - | |
| 2013 | Vanshvel | Marathi | - | |
| 2013 | Bandook | Hindi | Kajri | |
| 2015 | Chandrakor | Marathi | - | |
| 2016 | Friend Request | English | - | |
| 2018 | Isis 2 | English | - | |
| 2019 | Jhol | Hindi | - | |

=== Anchor ===
| Show / event | Comments |
|---|---|
| Asian Film Festival | |
| Marathi Film awards | ETV Marathi |
| Cricket World Cup | on Zee Marathi channel |
| Comedy Express | on ETV Marathi |

=== Reality show ===
| Year | Show / event | Comments |
|---|---|---|
| 2014 | Jhunj Marathmoli | On ETV Marathi |

== See also ==
- Cinema of India
- Bollywood
- Reality television
- Maharashtra State Film Awards
- Marathi movies
