= Aghera =

Village in Uttar Pradesh, India

Coordinates: 28°54′N 77°33′E

Aghera is a small village in district Meerut of western Uttar Pradesh, India. The village population is around 1100 People. The gram Pradhan of the village is Pushpendra. Village has people of multiple castes as kashyap kumhar sc nai Jats and Muslim also.
