= Bandook =

- Movie official poster
- Directed by: Aditya Om
- Written by: Aditya Om
- Produced by: Aditya Om
- Starring: Aditya Om; Manisha Kelkar; Arshad Khan
- Cinematography: P. Amar Kumar; Siddharth Kay; Devashish Sarkaar
- Edited by: Nilesh Gavand
- Music by: Nikhil Kamath; Lavan; Veeral
- Production companies: Modern Cinema; PunchTantra Motion Pictures
- Release date: 18 January 2013
- Country: India
- Language: Hindi

Bandook (transl. Gun) is a 2013 Indian Hindi-language crime film starring Aditya Om, Manisha Kelkar and Arshad Khan. The film was directed and produced by Aditya Om.

== Synopsis ==
The film depicts the rise of Bhola Kevat, a lower caste boatman "Mallaah" (Kewat) in the interiors of Uttar Pradesh, rising to the unexpected heights of political power. Bandook connects crime and politics, a psychological peek inside the minds of people who use the power of the gun as a ladder to worldly success. It shows the vast distance covered by the human mind from picking a gun to pulling the trigger.

== Development ==
Producer, director Aditya Om revealed he has been working on the script from two years as film is based on political Dons.

== Cast ==
- Aditya Om - Bhola Kevat
- Manisha Kelkar - Kajri
- Arshad Khan- Lochan Singh Yadav
- Ashish Kotwal- Hari Om Tripathi
- Gauri Shankar- Police Inspector Puttu Tiwari
- Virendra Singh- Virendra Singh

== Soundtrack ==
The music of the film was composed by Nikhil Kamath, Lavan and Veeral.

#	Title	Singer(s)
1	"Tu Jaldi Bata De"	Bandana Sharma, Siddharth Hazarika
2	"Chunaav Re"	Rekha Bhardwaj
3	"Shortcut Me Gundai"	Altaf Raja, Raju Bhasvar
4	"Mrigtrishna Marusthal" (Male)	Jagjit Singh
5	"Up Ki Holi"	Nikhil Kamath
6	"Mohe Balam"	Tori Dattaroy
7	"Ganga Ki Lehren"	Lavan

== Release ==
Justin Rao from The Hitavada gave it one star, and said, "It tries to be everything in the end and loses its own track on which it established itself. The movie has 100 shots of bullets but sadly not a single shot of brilliance". According to Box Office India, Bandook failed at box office and was termed as a disaster.
