= Ekk Thee Sanam =

- Directed by: Monish Kaushal
- Written by: D.R.K; C.R.Parthasarthi
- Screenplay by: D.R.K; C.R.Parthasarthi
- Produced by: D.R.K; C.R.Parthasarthi
- Starring: Nisha Triloki; Rajender Thakur; Gopal Thakur
- Music by: Various Artists
- Production company: Harmony Pictures
- Distributed by: Harmony Pictures
- Release date: 11 October 2013
- Running time: 85 minutes
- Country: India
- Language: Hindi

Ekk Thee Sanam is a 2013 Indian drama film directed by Monish Kaushal and produced by D.R.K and C.R.Parthasarthi under the Harmony Pictures banner. The film was released on 11 October 2013.

== Cast ==
- Nisha Triloki
- Rajender Thakur
- Gopal Thakur

== Plot ==
The film is about a married woman, Sanam, being unfaithful to her husband, Rajesh. The couple rents out a room, and the painter shoots a clip of Sanam bathing while Rajesh is away at work. He shows it to Sanam, who gets angry, but after that, she feels aroused and starts having an affair with the painter. The rest of the film is about Rajesh suspecting an affair with Sanam and the painter.

== Reception ==
Ekk Thee Sanam received generally negative reviews from critics. The film was one of the worst movie of 2013. Mihir Fadnavis of Firstpost stated, "With great vengeance, I have sifted through the cinematic trash can to collate the worst movies of the year. Because these movies weren’t hand grenades; they were atom bombs whose detonations of dreadfulness created Hiroshima and Nagasaki-sized mushroom clouds in my cerebrum and caused permanent damage to my mental harmony."
