= Aditya Om =

Indian actor and director

- Born: Aditya Singh; 5 October 1975 (age 51); Sultanpur, Uttar Pradesh, India
- Occupations: Film director, producer, actor, screenwriter, lyricist
- Years active: 2000–present
- Height: 5 ft 9 in (175 cm)
- Website: https://theadityaom.com/

Aditya Om (born 5 October 1975) is an Indian actor and director who works predominantly in Telugu and Hindi films. He also did theatre and serials. He debuted with Lahiri Lahiri Lahirilo (2002) as an actor and directed Bandook (2013). He got many best actor awards at various film festivals for the film Dahanam. In 2024, he also published a book named Story of Bharata based on the Hindu epic Mahabharata.

== Career ==
Aditya Om made his film debut as an actor with the Telugu-language multistarrer Lahiri Lahiri Lahirilo (2002) under the stage name Aditya. One critic noted that "Aditya['s] dialogue delivery is pretty bad and he overacted in most of the scenes" while another said that "Aditya is a poor choice to play such an important role". In his next film Dhanalakshmi, I Love You (2002), his performance was better received with a critic writing that "Aditya surprises us with his good histrionics" and another stated he "fit[s] perfectly" in his role. Aditya Om went on to star in several Telugu films including Mee Intikoste Em Istaaru Maa Intkoste Em Testaaru (2004) and Preminchukunnam Pelliki Randi (2004). During this time, he made his debut as a director with the silent film Mr Lonely Miss Lovely (2004). He has directed and acted in critically acclaimed film Bandook (2013). In regards to his performance, a critic opined that "Actor-director Aditya Om plays his part with conviction". The script of Bandook is a part of the Oscars library. The Hindi feature film Maassab (2018) directed by Aditya Om has won awards at various national and international film festivals.

He is actively involved in charity, social work and has adopted a village Cherupally in Telangana. He is also working for educational reforms with his organisation "Edulightment". He has constructed a library there and has opened digital service center and given laptops and solar lights to village school and people. He is working tirelessly for educational reforms under his organisation Edulightment; welfare of Tribals in Telangana, Auto drivers in Mumbai, and is also involved in human rights associations.

Aditya Om appeared in the Hindi OTT film Quota, which received attention for its social theme. His Telugu short film Pavithra was among the most-watched Telugu short films in 2022. His upcoming Hindi film is Bagawat. He also directed the film Maila which was selected for the NFDC Film Bazaar’s 'NFDC Recommends' section in 2021. As of 2022, Om began directing a Hindi biopic on Sant Tukaram. At the end of 2022 Aditya Om started an ambulance service for his adopted villages of Cherupally and Kothapalli.

In 2025, Om appeared in Bandi, a Telugu experimental film on climate change and Shanmukha, a Telugu-language crime thriller. Aditya also participated as a speaker at TEDx talk on cinema and social change at KES Shroff College, Mumbai.

== Filmography ==
=== Telugu films ===
| Year | Title | Role | Notes |
|---|---|---|---|
| 2002 | Lahiri Lahiri Lahirilo | Nani | |
| 2002 | Dhanalakshmi, I Love You | Shyam | |
| 2003 | Ottu E Ammai Evaro Teliyedu | | |
| 2004 | Mee Intikoste Em Istaaru Maa Intkoste Em Testaaru | Madhav | |
| 2004 | Preminchukunnam Pelliki Randi | Aditya | |
| 2005 | Bhama Kalapam | Aditya | |
| 2006 | Aakhiri Pagee | | |
| 2007 | Please Sorry Thanks | | |
| 2007 | DTS Nishabdam | | |
| 2007 | Podarillu | | |
| 2008 | Veedi Jimmada | | |
| 2009 | Giliginthalu | | |
| 2009 | Punnami Naagu | | Special appearance |
| 2010 | Maa Annayya Bangaram | Akash | |
| 2015 | Friend Request | | |
| 2016 | Vasantha Ragam | | |
| 2021 | Chethilo Cheyyesi Cheppu Bava | | |
| 2021 | Vikram | | |
| 2023 | Dahanam | Bharadwaj Sastry | |
| 2023 | Amaram | | |
| 2023 | Natho Nenu | Kotigadu | |
| 2023 | Yerra Gudi | | |
| 2025 | Bandi | | |
| 2025 | Shanmukha | Kamal | |

=== Other language films ===
| Year | Film | Role | Language | Ref. |
|---|---|---|---|---|
| 2004 | Mr Lonely Miss Lovely | | Silent | |
| 2008 | Salaam Hyderabad | | Urdu | |
| 2013 | Bandook | Bhola Kevat | Hindi | |
| 2015 | Friend Request | | Hindi | |
| 2017 | The Dead End | | English | |
| 2017 | Alif | Jamal | Hindi | |
| 2022 | Quota - The Reservation | Rajshekar | Hindi | |

=== As a director and producer ===
| Year | Title | Credited as | | Language | Notes | Ref. |
| Year | Title | Director | Producer | Language | Notes | Ref. |
|---|---|---|---|---|---|---|
| 2004 | Mr Lonely Miss Lovely | Yes | | Silent | | |
| 2012 | Shudra: The Rising | | Co-producer | Hindi | | |
| 2013 | Bandook | Yes | Yes | Hindi | | |
| 2015 | Dozakh in Search of Heaven | Creative | Co-producer | Hindi/Urdu | | |
| 2016 | Who Killed Rajiv? | Yes | | English | documentary | |
| 2018 | Maassab | Yes | | Hindi | | |
| 2025 | Sant Tukaram | Yes | | Hindi | | |

=== Television ===
| Year | Title | Role | Network | Notes | Ref(s) |
|---|---|---|---|---|---|
| 2024 | Bigg Boss 8 | Contestant | Star Maa | Evicted Day 32 | |
