= Chor Chor Super Chor =

- Theatrical release poster
- Directed by: K. Rajesh
- Screenplay by: K. Rajesh; Ani Thomas; V Radhakrishnan
- Produced by: Ved Kataria; Renu Kataria
- Starring: Deepak Dobriyal; Anshul Kataria; Priya Bathija; Paru Uma; Alok Chaturvedi; Bramha Mishra; Jagat Rawat; Chandrahas Tiwari; Shrikant Verma; Anurag Arora; Avtar Sahni; Kafil Ahmad
- Cinematography: Rakesh Haridas
- Music by: Mangesh Dhakde
- Distributed by: Multimedia Combines
- Release date: 2 August 2013
- Country: India
- Language: Hindi

Chor Chor Super Chor (transl. Thief! thief! Super thief!) is a 2013 Indian Hindi-language comedy film directed by K. Rajesh, and produced by Ved Kataria and Renu Kataria. The film stars Deepak Dobriyal, Anshul Kataria and Priya Bathija. It was released on 2 August 2013.

== Premise ==
Small-time theft and robbery is the central theme of this drama set in Delhi. In Delhi, Shukla runs a fake photo studio that’s actually a front for a gang of young petty thieves.

Satbir, one of the thieves, wants to leave crime behind and falls in love with Neena. Unknown to him, Neena is a TV investigative reporter. She tricks Satbir into showing her the gang’s street crimes and secretly records everything for an exposé.

When the report is about to air and expose the whole gang, Satbir comes up with a crazy plan. The gang breaks into the TV station, steals the footage, and edits it into a fake reality show called “Chor Chor Super Chor” — where the thieves steal things and then dramatically return them to the victims with a “Surprise! You’re on TV!” twist.

They prove the show is “real” by pulling the same prank on the TV station manager — stealing his car and then returning it on camera. Impressed, the manager cancels Neena’s report and airs their fake show instead.

In the final twist, the show becomes a massive hit across Delhi. Petty crime ends up increasing because people now let themselves get robbed since they think it’s part of the TV prank, in hopes they can get their stuff back and end up being famous.

== Cast ==
- Deepak Dobriyal
- Priya Bathija
- Anshul Kataria
- Paru Uma
- Alok Chaturvedi
- Bramha Mishra
- Jagat Rawat
- Chandrahas Tiwari
- Nitin Goel
- Shrikant Verma
- Anurag Arora
- Avtar Sahni
- Kafil ahmad

== Reception ==
Sarit Ray of Hindustan Times praised the lead actor Deepak Dobriyal's work as earnest, and convincing as the "super chor", and commended the editing as crisp. Shubhra Gupta from Indian Express called the acting and execution amateurish, but credited Dobriyal for his effort.
