= Sheetal Singh =

Indian actress

- Born: Lucknow, India
- Occupation: Actress
- Known for: Paanch, Horror Story

Sheetal Singh is an Indian actress best known for her role of 'Roshni' in the TV series Paanch 5 Wrongs Make A Right. Her film debut was Nasha in 2013 and followed by Horror Story. She was last seen in Halla Bol on Bindass Channel, Pyaar Tune Kya Kiya (TV series) on Zing, and Yeh Hai Aashqui on Bindass.

== Career ==
Singh's first breakthrough role was the 2013 Bollywood movie Nasha, in which she played the second female lead. Next was her role as Maya in Vikram Bhatt's production Horror Story. The film required her to go through a lengthy process of applying makeup for her role. She became more popular after appearing in the youth-oriented TV series Paanch 5 Wrongs Make A Right, in which she played the leading role of Roshni Kataria. After that, Singh played the lead role in an episode of Halla Bol. She then played the main character in Pyaar Tune Kya Kiya on Zing. Singh would be returning soon in Bollywood with her film Friend Request.

Singh received praise for her role 'Roshni' in TV series Paanch. She was nominated for the best debutante (Female) in Gold Awards 2014.

== Filmography ==
=== Films ===
Year	Film	Role	Notes
2013	Horror Story	Maya/Ghost	
2013	Nasha	Tia	

=== Television ===
Show	Role
C.I.D. (Indian TV series)	
Paanch 5 Wrongs Make A Right	Roshni
Halla Bol	Swati
Pyaar Tune Kya Kiya (TV series)	
Yeh Hai Aashiqui	
Crime Patrol	Aditi Pathak
Bade Achhe Lagte Hain	Ram's fiancé
