= Radhika Menon =

Indian publisher

Radhika Menon is an Indian publisher. She is the founder of Tulika books which was started by her publishing business in 1996.

== Early days ==
She mentioned that as a child she liked reading writers such as Enid Blyton, Charles Hamilton and W.E. Johns.

== Career ==
In 1978, with an interest in children's education, Menon worked at the J. Krishnamurti school. After J Krishnamurthi school in Chennai, she moved to Sardar Patel Vidyalaya in Delhi.

Menon and her sister in law, Indu Chandrasekhar ran a pre-press service called Tulika to "earn enough money" to publish their own books. Subsequently, Chandrasekhar founded Tulika Books in New Delhi in 1995, and Menon founded Tulika Publishers in Chennai.

== Tulika Books ==
Tulika's books for children pioneered a significant wave in Indian publishing in 1996. They publish children literature in languages such as English, Hindi, Tamil, Malayalam, Kannada, Telugu, Marathi, Gujarati and Bengali.
