= Aashim Gulati =

Indian actor (born 1990)

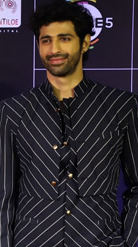
- Gulati in 2023
- Born: 15 September 1990 (age 36); Delhi, India
- Occupations: Actor; model
- Years active: 2015–present

Aashim Gulati (born 15 September 1990) is an Indian actor. He is known for his portrayal of Neel Gujral in Gulmohar Grand, Rehaan Khanna in Dil Sambhal Jaa Zara and Karna in Karn Sangini.

== Career ==
Gulati made his television debut in 2015 with Gulmohar Grand. In 2016, he made his film debut as Amar in Tum Bin II opposite Neha Sharma. In the same year, he played Ayush in Yeh Hai Aashiqui. In 2017, Gulati played Rehaan in Star Plus's Dil Sambhal Jaa Zara opposite Smiriti Kalra. The following year, he portrayed Karn in Star Plus's Karn Sangini opposite Tejasswi Prakash.

== Filmography ==
=== Films ===
Year	Title	Role	Notes	Ref.
2016	Tum Bin 2	Amar Shah		
2021	Tuesdays and Fridays	Jatin Singh		
2023	U-Turn	Aditya	Released on ZEE5	
2024	Murder Mubarak	Leo Mathews	Released on Netflix	
2024	Kahan Shuru Kahan Khatam	Krishna "Krish"		

=== Television ===
Year	Title	Role	Ref.
2015	Gulmohar Grand	Neel Gujral	
2016	Yeh Hai Aashiqui	Ayush	
2017–2018	Dil Sambhal Jaa Zara	Rehaan Khanna	
2018–2019	Karn Sangini	Karn	
2019–2020	Hostages	Aman	
2019	The Holiday	Armaan Sabarwal	
2023	Taj: Divided by Blood	Salim	
2023	Jee Karda	Arjun Gill	
2023	Choona	Yakub Ansari	
2024	Mohrey	Arjun Singh	
2025	Oops Ab Kya?	Samar Pratap Singh	
TBA	Yaari Dosti †	TBA	

=== Music videos ===
Year	Title	Singer	Ref.
2022	Hum Hi Hum The	Bandish Vaz	
