= Karn Sangini =

- Genre: Mythological; Drama
- Created by: Aayush Agrawal
- Based on: Karna's Wife: The Outcast's Queen by Kavita Kané
- Developed by: Shashi Mittal
- Story by: Shobhit Jaiswal; Sameer Mishra; Manali Karia; Dialogues: Raghuvir Shekhawat
- Directed by: Jai Basantu Singh; Tushar J. Bhatia; Huma Parveen
- Creative directors: Amit Bhargava; Aayush Agrawal
- Starring: Tejasswi Prakash; Aashim Gulati
- Country of origin: India
- Original language: Hindi
- No. of seasons: 1
- No. of episodes: 90

Production
- Executive producer: Aayush Agrawal
- Producers: Shashi Mittal; Sumeet Mittal
- Running time: 20 minutes
- Production company: Shashi Sumeet Productions

Original release
- Network: Star Plus
- Release: 22 October 2018 – 25 February 2019

Karn Sangini is a mythological Indian television series based on Kavita Kané's novel Karna's Wife: The Outcast's Queen that aired on StarPlus. Created by Shashi Sumeet Productions, it stars Tejasswi Prakash and Aashim Gulati and was cancelled on 25 February 2019 due to low viewership.

== Plot ==
Uruvi is Pukhiya's princess. As King Vahusha and Queen Shubra's only daughter, she was pampered from her birth and given whatever she wished for. She shares a strong bond of friendship with Arjun. Karn, on the other hand, though the son of Surya Dev, is considered of low caste because he was disowned by Kunti at his birth and adopted by a family of low caste; thus living a life full of hardships. Arjun has been in love with Uruvi since childhood but Uruvi considers him nothing more than a best friend.

Uruvi's friends Jaya and Vijaya gave her a precious pink gem which she gifts to Arjun as a sign of good luck. During a tournament, Karn challenges Arjun for a duel. Guru Drona refuses to let Karn take part in the competition, calling him a person of low caste. Duryodhana thus crowns Karn as the king of Anga. During the duel, Uruvi gets impressed with Karna's talent and courage. Karna's arrow breaks the pink gem gifted to Arjun by Uruvi. She approaches Karn and asks him to repair it. Karn promises to get her a similar gem by the next full moon. Duryodhana marries Bhanumati forcefully by kidnapping her. Bhanumati gives away her pink gem to Karn and he fulfills his promise to Uruvi. Uruvi and Karn slowly form a bond of mutual trust and respect.

Queen Shubra dislikes Karn due to his caste despite knowing that he is Kunti's eldest son who she had to disown. She always tries to push Uruvi towards Arjun. Despite this, Uruvi develops feelings for Karn.

Krishna makes Uruvi realize her love for Karn. Karn is a little hesitant at first but later accepts his feelings for Uruvi. When Shubra gets to know about Uruvi's love for Karn, she claims to never let the two unite. Karn confesses his love to Uruvi and the two marry each other. Uruvi is forced to leave her luxurious and comfortable lifestyle due to her marriage with Karn. Radha, Shubra, and Purushottam make Uruvi and Karn's life miserable but they overcome all the problems and challenges.

Enter Kasturi, who claims to be Karn's first wife. Her aim is to separate Uruvi from Karn and become the queen. She manages to create a lot of misunderstandings between them but is finally exposed and Karn and Uruvi have united once again.

Karn chooses to support Duryodhana during the Mahabharata war. Even after learning about the truth of his birth, he continues to support his friend and as a result, has to donate his armor and earrings to Indra.

Eventually, Karn meets his end at the hands of Arjun during the war. Later he is again tested by Krishna on his death bed and Karn donates his golden teeth thereby succeeding and attaining salvation.

After Karn's death, his son was tutored by Krishna who later became the king of Indraprastha. Thus Karn's journey might have ended but Uruvi and Karn's love story remained immortal.

== Cast ==
=== Main ===
- Tejasswi Prakash as Uruvi/Ponnuruvi: Karn's second wife, Pukhiya's princess, Vashuha and Shubra's only daughter, Radha and Adhirath's daughter-in-law
- Aashim Gulati as Karn: Uruvi and Kasturi's husband, Kunti and Surya God's only son, Radha and Adirath's foster son, Duryodhan's best friend, Shon's elder-half brother
- Charu Asopa as Kasturi: Karna's first wife, Adhirath and Radha's first daughter-in-law

=== Recurring ===
- Sayantani Ghosh as Kunti: Karna's biological mother, Mother of Pandavas, Pandu's first wife; Adopted daughter of Kuntibhoj, Draupadi's mother-in-law;Subhadra's buaa turned mother-in-law (2018-2019)
- Narayani Shastri as Radha: Karna's foster mother, Adhirath's wife, Shon's mother, Kasturi and Uruvi's mother-in-law. (2018-2019)
- Jyoti Gauba as Maharani Shubra: Vahush's wife, Uruvi's mother and Queen of Pukhiya Kingdom. (2018-2019)
- Syed Zafar Ali as Maharaj Vahush, Uruvi's Father and King of Pukhiya (2018-2019)
- Anand Suryavanshi as Adhirath: Radha's husband, Karn's foster father, Shon's father, Uruvi's father-in-law. (2018-2019)
- Amita Khopkar as Radha: Karna's foster mother, Adhirath's wife, Shon's mother, Uruvi's mother-in-law. (2018)
- Kinshuk Vaidya as Arjuna: Karna’s rival; Kunti and Indra's only son, Dronacharya's favorite student, Subhadra's husband, 3rd Pandav
- Paras Chhabra as Duryodhana: Dhritarashtra and Gandhari's eldest son, Dushasan's elder brother, Karna's best friend, Bhanumati's husband.
- Amit Dolawat as Krishna: Eighth incarnation of Lord Vishnu, Karna and Arjun's friend, Radha's consort, Rukmini and Satyabhama's husband, Dwarka's additional King. (2019)
- Ravneet Kaur as Bhanumati: Duryodhan's wife.
- Ajay Kumar Nain as Shakuni: Gandhari's brother, King of Gandhara kingdom, Duryodhan's maternal uncle, the main cause of Mahabharata War
- Tej Sapru as Purushottam
- Smita Singh as Gauri
- Urvashi Upadhyay as Kali
- Rehaan Roy as Dushasan: Gandhari and Dhritarashtra's son, Duryodhan's brother, Karna's friend
- Randheer Rai as Yudhishtir: Kunti and Yama's only son, eldest Pandava, Krishna's friend, Draupadi's husband.
- Devvrat Chaudhary as Bheem: Kunti and Vayu's son, Krishna's friend, Draupadi and Hidimba's husband, Ghatotkatch's father 2nd Pandav
- Sushant Marya as Sahadeva: Late Madri and Ashwin God's son, Draupadi and Vijaya's husband; Kunti's adopted son; Youngest Pandav
- Ruslaan Sayed as Nakul: Late Madri and Ashwin God's son, Draupadi and Karenumati's husband; Kunti's adopted son 4th Pandav
- Naveen Pandita as Shon: Radha and Adhirath's only biological son, Karna's half-younger brother. Kasturi and Uruvi's devar
- Shivendra Saainiyol as Bhishma; grand-uncle of Pandavas and Kauravas
- Amit Lekhwani as Dronacharya: Ashwathama's father, Bhishma's friend, Guru of Pandavas and Kauravas
- Ambuj Mathur as Ashwathama: Dronacharya's son, Duryodhan and Karna's friend
- Gufi Paintal as Kripacharya; Dronacharya's brother in law; Kripi's twin
- Yajuvendra Singh as Dhritarashtra: Gandhari's husband, father of Kauravas and Dushala
- Suman Gupta as Gandhari: Dhritarashtra's wife, Mother of Kauravas and Dushala
- Deepak Jethi as Drupad: King of Panchala, Draupadi's father.
- Madhusree Sharma as Surili: Uruvi's maid
- Raj Premi as Parashurama: Sixth incarnation of Lord Vishnu, Karna, Bhishma and Dronacharya's guru.
- Shweta Rajput as Vijaya: Uruvi's friend
- Aleya Ghosh as Jaya: Uruvi's friend
- Pakhi Mendola as Young Uruvi/Ponnuruvi
- Rudra Soni as Young Karn

=== Casting ===
Tejasswi Prakash and Aashim Gulati were cast as the leads Urvi and Karn. Karan Sharma was initially cast as Krishna. But later it came down to Sachin Shroff when Sharma stepped out. But he also steeped out due to date issues and finally Anant Joshi was cast. Sayantani Gosh was cast as Kunti. Kinshuk Vaida was cast as Arjun. In December 2018, he quit due to the revamp when his character was sidelined. Sushant Marya was cast as Sahadev Paras Chabbra was cast as Duryodhan. and Reyhaan Roy was cast as Dushashan. Ruslan Sayed was cast as Nakul. Narayani Shastri was finalized for the role of Radha instead of Amita Khopkar during the revamp.

== Development ==
Karn Sangini was supposed to go on air from 9 October, but was postponed to 22 October 2018 by the channel due to Navaratri.

After 30 episodes the show underwent a complete revamp in the story line. As a result, most of the supporting actors quit the show and some new characters were introduced. Actress Madirakshi Mundle who was assigned to play the role of Draupadi could not enter the show due to the revamp.
