= Meher – Kahani Haq Aur Haqeeqat Ki =

Indian television series

- Promotional logo image
- Written by: Pawan K Sethhi
- Directed by: Sachin Deo; Salar Shaikh
- Starring: see below
- Opening theme: "Meher" by Kiran Mehta
- Country of origin: India
- Original languages: Hindi; Urdu
- No. of episodes: 300

Production
- Producers: Ronnie Screwvala; Zarina Mehta; Deven Khote
- Running time: 25 minutes
- Production company: UTV Software Communications

Original release
- Network: DD National
- Release: 3 January 2004 – 27 January 2006

Meher – Kahani Haq Aur Haqeeqat Ki is an Indian Hindi television Soap opera which aired on DD National from 3 January 2004 to 27 January 2006.

== Plot ==
The story revolves around Meher - a smart, beautiful, kind-hearted and perky girl. As a journalist, she supports her family of six members along with her two brothers Ejaz, her elder brother and Mehfooz, her slightly younger brother. Her family also consists of Saajiya, Meher's younger sister-in-law, who is supportive and Bilkis, Meher's elder and evil Bhabhi who does not consider the whole family her own, except her husband Ejax. She often quarrels with her husband because of mundane household reasons and sometimes conspires against Meher due to jealousy.

Meher comes across Irfan, a rich business tycoon, who is her perfect opposite. Initially, they dislike each other but with the course of time, they start developing feelings for each other and together attempt a loving relationship. But Meher's bhabhi Bilkis is jealous of her. She wants Irfan for her sister, Naseem. She separates Meher and Irfan before their marriage. Irfan marries Naseem and Meher marries Shehzad. After facing a lot of struggles and hurdles, both Meher and Irfan sort out all of their misunderstandings and decide to unite now. In the meantime, Rukhsana, the family foe, enters Meher's life. She has a dark past: She stole Meher's twin sister Shabana and raised her according to her evil wishes. She uses Shabana as a pawn. Shabana used to allure rich men using her beauty at first and then, either she killed them or forcibly took all of their wealth. When she saw Irfan and Meher, she thought to betray Irfan just like others at first. She tries to take benefit of the fact that both Meher and Shabana look exactly same. Later, she discovers that Meher is her own sister and that is why they are identical. She questions Rukhsana why she never told her about Meher and her family. But Rukhsana brainwashes her that her own mother, Shaheen Begum abandoned her and preferred Meher as her daughter other than Shabana. This makes Shabana avenge Meher as she believes that Meher was the sole reason her own mother abandoned her. After putting all her efforts to take Meher's place, Shabana destroys Meher's marital life by killing Irfan.

After Irfaan's death Meher married Irfaan's younger brother Zayed Khan unwillingly just to save Irfaan's company and Irfaan's family from the evil Shabana who takes her place as Meher in the Irfaan's house. Zayed thinks that Meher is Shabana as Shabana takes place Irfaan house as Meher. Zayed loves Meher after their marriage. But Meher does not love Zayed at first. Sometimes Zayed tries to close with Meher but Meher maintain a distance with him and they do not consummate their marriage. But one night Shabana takes advantage of the Zayed's love for Meher and disguise herself as Meher in front of him and slept with him. Zayed thinks her as his real wife and consummate his love with her. One day Shabana kidnapped Zayed's mother and Zayed and his mother discovers her true colours. Meher slowly develop feelings for Zayed. Aali killed Meher's best friend Vrinda and Meher framed for her murder. The Police inspector who is on the favour of Aali, frame up Meher for the Vrinda's murder. Zayed and Meher run to save themselves from the evil Police, at the that time Zayed is hurt by a police bullet on his back and Meher has removed the bullet from his back and save his life. Meher feels the pain of Zayed and finally accept him as her husband and Zayed Meher finally consummate their marriage. After their consummation Meher tell Zayed that she is the real Meher. But police catches them both and take them to the jail. Zayed gets bail but Meher can not get bail, to save Meher Zayed uses his law certificates and become lawyer of her as Meher do not get any lawyer for her. At that time because of Aali Zayed learns that Shabana killed his brother Irfaan and he wants to kill Shabana in retaliation. But Shabana then revealed that she is pregnant with his child as that night Zayed mistaken her as Meher. Zayed is helpless and do not kill her. Zayed then confess about his mistake in front of Meher and Meher forgives him. Zayed confess his love for Meher by writing a love letter with his blood. Meher reads the love letter in the jail and finally confess that she loves him, too. Then Shabana makes Zayed married to her forcefully for saving Meher from that case. Meher release from the jail and Zayed married to Shabana just for saving Meher from the murder case. Meher is shocked to see them married. She is heartbroken after betrayal of her husband Zayed. But when Shabana give birth a baby girl, Zayed confess to Meher that he has done all this to just save her from the jail and now he will kill Shabana. He takes Shabana to a hill site and tries to kill her. But Meher comes in between and tries to save Shabana. But Zayed kills Shabana. Zayed hugs real Meher and tell her that now no one can come in between them. But then Shabana catches Meher's feet and pulls Meher's leg telling Zayed that he has to live his life without his love Meher and it is his punishment. Both Meher and Shabana fall from the hill.

=== 5 Years leap ===
Zayed is lonely without Meher. He seeks Meher for five years. Then it is revealed that Meher is alive and she lost her memory and also her face has changed. All this was done by Aali and Rukhsana to destroy Zayed. Aali make Meher Zayed's enemy and name her as Naaz and send her to destroy Zayed. Meher (now Naaz) conspiracy to destroy Zayed as she thinks he is her enemy. But she regained her memory back and reunite with Zayed and finally married him. But after sometime of their marriage when Meher is pregnant with Zayed's child Irfaan returns. Dr Nigar one close friend of Zayed enter their lives. Nigar loves Zayed one-sided and she kills Meher's unborn child. Irfaan now acts as a mad man. His madness get extreme level that Meher has to get her original face back just for Irfaan's sake. Doctors help Meher to get her original face back. But Meher who is now Zayed's wife and loves only Zayed now do not want to go back to Irfaan. But because of Irfaan's madness she again marries Irfaan against her will. Now it is revealed that Irfaan fakes his madness just to get Meher and he is bad man now. Meher discovers the truth and wants to get rid of Irfaan. As she loves only Zayed. After so much difficulty Zayed and Meher remarried at the final episode and happily lived after and Irfaan get exposed.

== Cast ==
- Payal Nair in dual roles as
  - Meher: Shabana's twin sister - Married to Shehzad later divorced; Irfan's wife; Zayed's wife after Irfan's death
  - Shabana: Meher's twin sister- Aman's estranged wife; Irfan's fake wife; Zayed's former wife and obsessive lover
- replaced by Shilpa Shinde as Meher/Naaz
- Ujjwal Rana as Zayed Khan- Husband of Meher after Irfaan's death; Irfan's brother
- Buddhaditya Mohanty as Irfaan- Elder brother of Zayed; Naseem's ex-husband later divorced; Meher's husband but later killed by Shabana and Rukhshana
- Indraneel Bhattacharya as Numan- Shabana's loyal husband
- Neena Cheema as Shaheen Begum- Meher's and Shabana's mother
- Shabanam Kapoor as Rukhshana -Shaheen's enemy and Shabana's adoptive mother
- Sheily Shukla as Irfaan and Zayed's mother
- Chandan Anand as Aali- Irfaan and Zayed's brother
- Shahab Khan as Irfaan's Mamu
- Chetanya Adib as Eijaz- Meher's first brother; Mehfooz' elder brother; Bilkki's husband
- Anjali Mukhi as Bilkkis Bhabhi- Meher'and Mehfooz first Bhabhi; Eijas wife; Naseem's elder sister
- Sumeet Pathak as Mehfooz- Meher's second brother; Eijaz younger brother; Sadia's husband
- Vineeta Thakur as Sadia- Meher's second Bhabhi; Mehfooz's wife
- Sonica Handa as Naseem- Bilkkis younger sister, Irfaan's ex-wife
- Rishina Kandhari as Dr.Nigar- Zayed's friend
- Rajeev Paul as Shehzad- Meher's first husband

== Reception ==
The series opened with 7 TVR occupying eighteenth position in the debut week. The following week it garnered an average of 7.2 with a peak of 8.4 TVR.
