= Indraneel Bhattacharya =

Indian film and television actor

Aarya Bhatta
- Born: Indraneel Bhattacharya; 14 October 1970 (age 55)
- Occupation: Actor
- Years active: 2004–present
- Spouse: Anjali Mukhi (m. 2005)

Indraneel Bhattacharya, mostly known (common name) Aarya Bhatta (born 14 October 1970) is an Indian film and television actor. He began his career as a background artist in films. He is married to actress Anjali Mukhi.

== Career ==
He wast first seen in Sanjay Leela Bansali's Hum Dil De Chuke Sanam. The actor later went on to play several roles in Bollywood films including films including Rustom, Golmaal Again, and Jai Gangaajal. Indraneel has also worked in various Hindi TV serials such as Gustakh Dil, Yeh Pyar Na Hoga Kam, Meher, Kumkum – Ek Pyara Sa Bandhan, Khwaish, I Luv My India.

== Filmography ==
=== Films ===
Year	Title	Role	Notes
2006	Shanu Taxi	Passenger 1	
2006	One Night with the King	Bigthan	
2006	The Domino Effect	Rahul	
2016	Rustom	Captain C. P. Cherian	
2016	Fan	Akhtar	
2016	Jai Gangaajal	IG Mithilesh Kumar	
2017	Golmaal Again		
2017	Noor		
2018	Baaghi 2		
2019	Batla House	News Channel Head	
2020	Taanashah	Ajay Sinha	
2021	Bunty Aur Babli 2	Bank Manager Raman	
2026	Mardaani 3	Ambassador Sahu	

=== Television ===
Year	Serial	Role
2004–2006	Meher	Aman
2007–2008	Khwaish	Shahnawaz Khan
2008–2009	Kumkum – Ek Pyara Sa Bandhan	Omprakash Raichand
2009	Mere Ghar Aayi Ek Nanhi Pari	
2010	Yeh Pyar Na Hoga Kam	
2010–2012	Preet Se Bandhi Ye Dori Ram Milaayi Jodi	Satnam Singh Bedi
2011	Sasural Genda Phool	Ishwar Kashyap
2012	I Luv My India	
2013–2014	Gustakh Dil	Indra Bharadwaj
2016	Bade Bhaiyya Ki Dulhania	Prahlad Raizada
2017–2018	Dil Sambhal Jaa Zara	Mahendra Gupta
2020–2022	Imlie	Dev Chaturvedi
2023–2025	Ghum Hai Kisikey Pyaar Meiin	Shantanu Bhosle
2026–present	Yeh Fitoor Tera	Dr. Anoop Mathur

=== Web series ===
Year	Title	Role	Network	Notes
2020	Bebaakee	Indrapreet Sahani	ALTBalaji	
2020	Beehad Ka Baghi		MX Player	
2021	Mai Hero Boll Raha Hu	Bakshi	ALTBalaji, ZEE5	
2021–present	Mumbai Diaries 26/11	Dr. Pranab Parekh	Amazon Prime Video	
2022	Cyber Vaar – Har Screen Crime Scene	Mr.Roy	voot	
2023	Jubilee	Nanik Jotwani	Amazon Prime Video	

== Awards and nominations ==
- Nominated - Zee Rishtey Award for Favourite Mata-Pita.
