= Saas Bina Sasural =

Indian Hindi-language dramedy series

- Genre: Comedy; Family drama
- Created by: Vipul D. Shah
- Written by: Dialogues; Rajesh Soni; Munisha Rajpal
- Screenplay by: Zama Habib; Munisha Rajpal
- Story by: Zama Habib; Sonal Gantra; Garima Goyal
- Directed by: Arunn Ranjankar
- Creative directors: Ritu Goel; Mrinal Tripathi
- Starring: See below
- Country of origin: India
- Original language: Hindi
- No. of seasons: 1
- No. of episodes: 411

Production
- Executive producers: Mohit Rajyaguru; Nisha Rawal
- Producers: Vipul D. Shah; Sanjiv Sharma
- Production location: Mumbai, Maharashtra
- Cinematography: Pushpank Gawade
- Editor: Hemanth Kumarr
- Camera setup: Multi-camera
- Running time: Approx. 20–25 minutes
- Production company: Optimystix Entertainment

Original release
- Network: Sony Entertainment Television
- Release: 18 October 2010 – 6 September 2012

Saas Bina Sasural (transl. in-law without mother-in-law) is an Indian Hindi-language dramedy based on the story of a young lady, Taanya, a.k.a. Toasty, who has a "sasural" (in-laws' house) consisting of seven quirky men, deprived of a "saas" (mother-in-law). The series aired on Sony TV. The series premiered on 18 October 2010, and was produced by Vipul D. Shah of Optimystix Entertainment. The show went off-air on 6 September 2012.

== Plot ==
Taanya Sharma, called Toasty, is a schoolteacher. She falls in love with Tej Prakash Chaturvedi, the third son of a family with only men in it. Toasty then finds herself in a family in which there is a Dadaji (grandfather), Pitaji (father) and five brothers, Tej being the middle one.

Toasty finds out that the eldest son, Pashu, was married to Maalti. Maalti had run away as she thought that she was treated as a maid in this family. She was brainwashed by her evil mother. To get away from the family Maalti falsely accused Ved of molestation and Pitaji for demanding dowry. While she was leaving home, Dadaji tries to stop her but trips on stairs thus losing his ability to walk. Toasty clears all the misunderstandings and brings back Maalti. The family also accepts her back.

Maalti gets to know that she is pregnant and hence the family decides to bring Ganga Devi to stay with them and take care of her. Ganga Devi (called Naani Maa) is Pitaji's mother-in-law (Vimla’s mother). She is an orthodox person, who has great faith in Indian traditions but is tough and blunt in her approach. She sees that the family is having several problems with Nitika going to her job leaving Toasty alone to manage all the works with Maalti being pregnant. Naani Maa doesn't like this and hence asks Nitika to quit her job. But all family members disagree with this.

In a misunderstanding between Toasty and Naani Maa, Naani Maa scolds her and hence Toasty leaves home. She meets an accident and goes in coma. But Naani Maa makes an Ayurvedic medicine for her and Toasty returns to her family. Still being weak, Nitika has to do all the household chores. Ved and Pashu fight over this and Ved plans to step out of the house. All family members convince Ved and Pashu to apologize to each other and then Ved returns home.

Pashu's daughter is named Toasty in memory of Toasty. Also, Smiley and Tej participate in the Salsa competition because it was Toasty's wish and Smiley eventually falls in love with Tej. Since it was Toasty's wish to get Smiley and Tej married, the whole family arrange Smiley's marriage to Tej. Tej unwillingly agrees to marry Smiley because it was Toasty's wish. However, when Tej finds out that Toasty is alive, he tries backing out of the marriage, despite knowing the fact that Smiley is in love with him. He tries convincing the family about Toasty's existence, but nobody except Smiley believes him. Smiley helps Tej in finding Toasty and they succeed. Tej forces Toasty to return home and after much persuasion she returns, returning the smiles of all the family members. She meets her niece, and Chedidlal promises to treat Toasty to the biggest surgeon available. After that Toasty and Tej remarry.

== Cast ==
=== Main ===
- Ravi Dubey as Tejprakash "Tej" Chaturvedi – Cheddilal and Vimla's third son; Pashu, Ved, Pracheen and Gyan's brother; Toasty's husband
- Aishwarya Sakhuja as Tanya "Toasty" Sharma Chaturvedi – Sudha and Lalit's elder daughter; Dimple's sister; Tej's wife

=== Recurring ===
- Darshan Jariwala as Cheddilal Chaturvedi – Anandilal's son; Vimla's widower; Pashu, Ved, Tej, Pracheen and Gyan's father; Jr. Toasty's grandfather
- Arvind Vaidya as Anandilal Chaturvedi – Cheddilal's father; Pashu, Ved, Tej, Pracheen and Gyan's grandfather; Jr. Toasty's great-grandfather
- Rajendra Chawla as Pashupatinath Chaturvedi – Cheddilal and Vimla's eldest son; Ved, Tej, Pracheen and Gyan's brother; Malti's husband; Jr. Toasty's father
- Rohini Banerjee as Maalti Chaturvedi – Pashu's wife; Jr. Toasty's mother
- Rishi Khurana as Vedprakash "Ved" Chaturvedi – Cheddilal and Vimla's second son; Pashu, Tej, Pracheen and Gyan's brother; Nitika's husband
- Shruti Bapna as Nitika Chaturvedi – Toasty's best friend; Ved's wife
- Shraman Jain as Pracheenprakash "Pracheen" Chaturvedi – Cheddilal and Vimla's fourth son; Pashu, Ved, Tej and Gyan's brother
- Meghan Jadhav as Gyanprakash "Gyan" Chaturvedi – Cheddilal and Vimla's youngest son; Pashu, Ved, Tej and Pracheen's brother
- Amit Varma as Jai Malhotra – Kiya's husband
- Rucha Gujarathi as Kiya Malhotra – Ved's ex-fiancée; Jai's wife
- Rajeev Kumar as Lalit Sharma – Sudha's husband; Toasty and Dimple's father
- Anjali Mukhi as Sudha Sharma – Lalit's wife; Toasty and Dimple's mother
- Ketaki Chitale as Dimple Sharma – Sudha and Lalit's younger daughter; Toasty's sister
- Simple Kaul as Smita Lumba – Toasty's friend
- Rubina Dilaik as Simran / Smiley – Toasty's friend; Tej's ex-fiancée
- Kavita Vaid as Shanti (Buaa)
- Gopi Desai as Ganga Devi
- Anchal Sabharwal as Damini, Toasty's friend
- Kiran Bhargava as Shobha Devi
- Tanvi Thakkar as Riya
- Neha Jhulka as Divya
- Yogesh Tripathi as Baiju
- Indraneel Bhattacharya as Mr. Patel (Tej's boss)
- Riyanka Chanda as Ekta (special appearance as Nitika's cousin)
- Eijaz Khan as Eijaz (special appearance in the song "Zor Ka Jhatka Dheere Se Laga")
- Rohit Suchanti as Bittu Chaturvedi, Child Artist

== Awards ==
Years	Awards	Category	Cast	Results
2011	BIG Television Awards	Bechara Character (Male)	Rajendra Chawla	Won
2011	BIG Television Awards		Aishwarya Sakhuja	Won

== Sequel ==
In 2020, Saas Bina Sasural was revived for Season 2. The show was initially titled as Saas Bina Sasural 2 but later was renamed as Sargam Ki Sadhe Satii. The sequel has comedy genre with Anjali Tatrari as Sargam Aparshakti Awasthi and Kunal Saluja as Aparshakti Awasthi(Appu) as leads. Darshan Jariwala reprised for the role of Cheddilal Anandilal Awasthi as Aparshakti's father. The show also gained popularity but due to second wave COVID-19 pandemic, the show went off air with abrupt ending within 2 months on 23 April 2021 with 45 episodes.

== Crossover ==
On 13 April 2012, Saas Bina Sasural had a crossover with Parvarrish – Kuchh Khattee Kuchh Meethi.
