= Yasser Desai =

Indian singer-songwriter

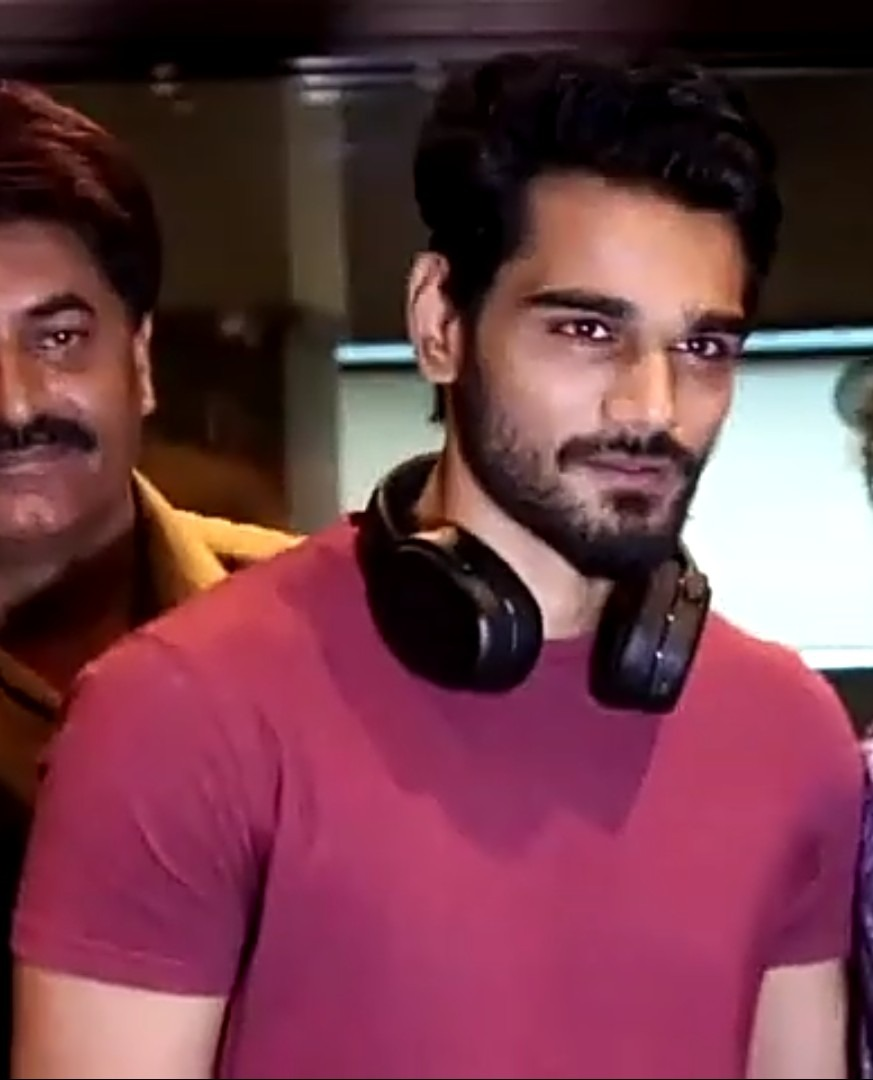
- Desai in 2019

Background information
- Born: 15 November 1989 (age 36); Mumbai, Maharashtra, India
- Genres: Indipop; Sufi; Bollywood
- Occupations: Singer; Lyricist; Poet; Author
- Instruments: Guitar; Vocals; Piano
- Years active: 2016–present
- Website: Official site

Yasser Desai (born 15 November 1989) is an Indian singer-songwriter known for working in Hindi cinema. He is best known for his songs "Hue Bechain" and "Aankhon Me Aasoon Leke" from 2017 drama film Ek Haseena Thi Ek Deewana Tha.

Desai made his Bollywood debut with 2016 film Beiimaan Love, in which he sang three songs- “Main Adhoora", in "Mere Peeche Hindustan" and “RangReza" (Male). Subsequently, he sang many blockbuster songs like "Dil Ko Karaar Aaya", "Hue Bechain", "Aankhon Me Aansoon Leke", Dil maang Raha Hai, Pallo Latke, Makhna, Jeene Bhi De, Naino Ne Baandhi, Jitni Dafa, Jogi, Twist Kamariya, Mehbooba, Rang Dariya and many more.

== Early life and background ==
Yasser Desai was born on 15 November 1989 in Mumbai, Maharashtra to a Gujarati family. He started his journey in music from the age of 11. He made his Bollywood singing debut with the 2016 film 'Beiimaan Love'. He sung two songs from that movie called "Main Adhoora" along with "Aakanksha Sharma" and the other one, "Mere Peeche Hindustaan Hai", along with Sukriti Kakar. He has sung the song called 'Itna Tumhe Chahna Hai' from the movie 'Machine' which was a smash hit. He lent his voice in many web series and TV series like 'Zakhmi', 'Bade Bhaiya Ki Dulhan', 'Dil Sambhal Jaa Zara' and so on. He made his Gujarati singing debut with a song titled "Tharva De" from the 2017 Gujarati movie Rachna No Dabbo? He made his Bengali singing debut with the song "Aalto Chhuye" from the 2018 movie Girlfriend. The song was composed by the very famous Jeet Gannguli. In the 2018 movie Gold, he had two songs called "Naino Ne Baandhi" and "Mono Beena". He won the "Best Playback Singer Of The Year" in the 2019 Zee Cine Awards for the song "Naino Ne Baandhi". Till now he had sung more than 200 songs for many Bollywood movies. He has also sung several singles for Zee Music Company and many other music channels.

== Filmography ==
=== Film ===
Year	Film	Song	Music	Lyricist	Co-singer(s)	Note
2016	Beiimaan Love	"Main Adhoora"	Sanjeev–Darshan	Sameer Anjaan	Aakanksha Sharma	
2016	Beiimaan Love	"Mere Peeche Hindustan"	Amjad-Nadeem	Sameer Anjaan	Sukriti Kakar	
2016	Beiimaan Love	"RangReza (Male)"	Asad Khan	Raqueeb Alam		
2017	Machine	"Itna Tumhe"	Tanishk Bagchi	Arafat Mehmood	Shashaa Tirupati	
2017	Machine	"Tu Hi Toh Mera"	Tanishk Bagchi	Arafat Mehmood		
2017	Ek Haseena Thi Ek Deewana Tha	"Ek Haseena Thi Ek Deewana Tha - Title Track"	Nadeem Saifi	Nadeem Saifi		
2017	Ek Haseena Thi Ek Deewana Tha	"Hue Bechain"	Nadeem Saifi	Nadeem Saifi	Palak Muchhal	
2017	Ek Haseena Thi Ek Deewana Tha	"Hanste Hanste"	Nadeem Saifi	Nadeem Saifi	Palak Muchhal	
2017	Ek Haseena Thi Ek Deewana Tha	"Aankhon Mein Aansoon"	Nadeem Saifi	Nadeem Saifi	Palak Muchhal	
2017	Ek Haseena Thi Ek Deewana Tha	"Tum Kahaan They"	Nadeem Saifi	Nadeem Saifi	Palak Muchhal	
2017	Ek Haseena Thi Ek Deewana Tha	"Nain"	Nadeem Saifi	Faaiz Anwar	Palak Muchhal	
2017	Bareilly Ki Barfi	"Twist Kamariya"	Tanishk-Vayu		Harshdeep Kaur, Altamash Faridi	
2017	Fukrey Returns	"Mehbooba Remake"	Prem-Hardeep	Kumaar	Neha Kakkar, Raftaar, Mohammed Rafi	
2017	Tera Intezaar	"Mehfooz"	Raj Ashoo	Shabbir Ahmed		
2017	Behen Hogi Teri	"Teri Yadoon Mein"	Yash Narvekar	Yash Narvekar, Amit Dhanani	Yash Narvekar, Pawni Pandey, Shubhanshu Kesharwani	
2017	Behen Hogi Teri	"Tenu Na Bol Pawan"	Amjad-Nadeem	Rohit Sharma	Jyotica Tangri	
2017	Shaadi Mein Zaroor Aana	"Jogi (Duet)"	Arko		Aakanksha Sharma	
2017	Shaadi Mein Zaroor Aana	"Pallo Latke Remake"	Saim-Zain-Raees	Kumaar, Rosh	Jyotica Tangri, Fazilpuria	
2018	Parmanu: The Story of Pokhran	"Jitni Dafa"	Jeet Gannguli	Rashmi Virag		
2018	Parmanu: The Story of Pokhran	"De De Jagah"	Sachin–Jigar	Kumaar Vishwas		
2018	Gold	"Naino Ne Baandhi"	Arko			
2018	Gold	"Monobina"	Tanishk Bagchi	Vayu	Monali Thakur, Shashaa Tirupati, Farhad Bhiwandiwala	
2018	Kaashi in Search of Ganga	"Tujhe Dhoondte Rahe"	Raj Ashoo	Shabbir Ahmed		
2018	Raazi	"Dilbaro (Shehnai Mix)	Shankar–Ehsaan–Loy	Javed Akhtar		
2018	Bhaiaji Superhit	"Do Naina"	Amjad-Nadeem		Aakanksha Sharma	
2018	Bhaiaji Superhit	"Baby Jaanleva Hai"	Amjad-Nadeem		Pawni Pandey	
2018	Bhaiaji Superhit	"Sleepy Sleepy Aakhiyan"	Jeet Gannguli	Kumaar	Asees Kaur	
2018	Untouchables	"Aisha Kabhi"	Harish Sagane	Shakeel Azmi		
2018	Spotlight	"Khafa Khafa"	Harish Sagane	Shakeel Azmi		
2018	Girlfriend	"Aalto Chhuye"	Jeet Gannguli	Raja Chanda	Aakanksha Sharma	Bengali film
2019	Bombairiya	"Sajde Karoon"	Amjad-Nadeem		Meraj Warsi, Riyaz Warsi, Faraz Warsi	
2019	Uri: The Surgical Strike	"Bah Chala"	Shashwat Sachdev	Raj Shekhar	Shashwat Sachdev	
2019	Zakhmi	"Yeh Pyaar Ho Na Khatam"	Harish Sagane	Shakeel Azmi		
2019	The Zoya Factor	"Maheroo"	Shankar–Ehsaan–Loy	Amitabh Bhattacharya		
2019	Jabariya Jodi	"Dhoonde Aakhiyaan"	Tanishk Bagchi	Rashmi Virag	Altamash Faridi	
2019	Article 15	"Naina Yeh"	Piyush Shankar	Rashmi Virag	Aakanksha Sharma	
2019	Marudhar Express	"Tum Chale Gaye (Male)"	Jeet Gannguli	Rashmi Virag		
2019	Marudhar Express	"Chashni Si"	Jeet Gannguli	Vishal Mishra	Jeet Gannguli	
2019	Beautiful	"Mann Mera"				
2019	Drive	"Makhna"	Tanishk Bagchi	Ozil Dalal, Tanishk Bagchi	Asees Kaur	
2019	Motichoor Chaknachoor	"Choti Choti Gal"	Arjuna Harjai	Kumaar	Arjuna Harjai	
2019	Yaaram	"Yaaram"	Rochak Kohli	Kumaar	Chitralekha Sen	
2019	Ghost	"Dil Mang Raha Hai"	Sanjeev-Darshan	Sanjeev-Ajay		
2019	Ghost	"Janmo Janam"	Nayeem-Shabir	Shakeel Azmi		
2019	Ghost	"Rooh Ka Rishta"	Sonal Pradhan			
2019	Ujda Chaman	"Oh Bandeya"	Gourov-Roshin	Devshi Khanduri		
2020	Jawaani Jaaneman	"Bandhu Tu Mera"	Gourov-Roshin	Devshi Khanduri		
2020	Shimla Mirchi	"Sau Galtiyan"	Meet Bros Anjjan	Kumaar	Meet Bros Anjjan, Khushboo Grewal	
2020	Ateet	"Akele Mein"	Harish Sagne	Shakeel Azmi		
2020	Hacked	"Tu Jo Mili"	Jeet Gannguli	Shakeel Azmi		
2020	Hacked	"Ab Na Phir Se"	Amjad-Nadeem			
2021	The Big Bull	"Hawaon Ke Sheher Mein"	Gourav Dasgupta	Kunwar Juneja		
2021	Chehre	Rang Dariya	Gourav Dasgupta	Farhan Menon		
2021	Cash	"Lag Gayi"	Gourov-Roshin			
2021	Badnam	Tu Pyaar Hai Mera	Harish Sagane	Shakeel Azmi		

=== Single ===
Album	Song(s)	Notes	Ref(s)
Naam Tera (Upcoming)	Mujhe Bandh Le	Lyrics By-Gulzar And Music By-Amit Mishra	
Single	Tera Mera Pyaar 2.0	Duet with Josh Sahunta Lyrics By Praveen Bharadwaj, Josh Sahunta And Music By Prem, Hardeep	
Single	Bepanah Pyar	Duet with Payal Dev Lyrics Shabbir Ahmad & Payal Dev	
Single	Main Royaan	Music by Rajat Nagpal Lyrics Rana Sotal	
Single	Jaa Rahe Ho	Music & Lyrics Kunal vermaa	
Sukoon	Rula Deti Hai	Music by Rajat Nagpal Lyrics Rana Sotal	Featuring Karan kundra & Tejasswi parkash
Single	Kamle	Featuring Karan kundra	
Single	Mere Sanam	Featuring Shidharth Nigam & Somya Verma	
Single	Badnaam kiya	Featuring Hiba Nawab Music by Fenil Dhola Lyrics Nandish zadafiya	
Single	Main Tera Ho Gaya	Music by Anmol Daniel Lyrics Pankaj Dixit	
Single	Ishq Lagan	Music by Saurabh Mishra Lyrics by Dheeraj kumar	
Single	Main Bhi Barbaad	Music by Gourov Das Gupta Lyrics Kunwar Juneja	
Single	Marjawaan	Duet with Asees Kaur Music by Tanisk Bagchi	
Single	Mukammal	Music & Lyrics by Sanjeev chaturvedi	
Single	Rihaee	Music & Lyrics by Sanjeev Chaturvedi	
Mixtape	Dil Hai Ki Manta Nahi/Nazar Ke Samne	Duet with Shilpa Rao	
Single	Saiyyonee	Music Gaurav Lyrics Sameer	
Single	Dil Mera	Featuring Ayat Sheikh Music by Jitendra Vishwakarma	
Single	Mohabbat Phir Ho Jayegi	Featuring Arjun Bijlani & Adaa Khan	
Single	Tanha Hoon	Featuring Amir Ali & Hiba Nawab	
Ateet	Akele Mein	Composer Harish Sagane Lyrics Shakeel Azmi	
Sukoon	Dil Ko Karaar Aaya	Duet with Neha Kakkar featuring Sidharth Shukla and Neha Sharma	
Single	Khuda Kare	on Zee Music Company	
Tu Shifa Meri (Single)	Tu Shifa Meri	Composer Rashid Khan	
Tu Jo Kahe (Single)	Tu Jo Kahe	Composer Palash Muchhal Single Track	
Dil Sambhal Jaa Zara	Jeene Bhi De, Ae Dil Na Kar	Composer Harish Sagane Lyrics Shakeel Azmi	
Pavitra Rishta	Jaisi Ho Waisi Raho	ft. Sushant Singh Rajput and Ankita Lokhande	
Single	Teri Umeed Tera Intezaar	Ft Javed Mohsin - Neeti Mohan - Shruti Sharma	

== Awards and nominations ==
Year	Awards	Category	Nominated for	Result	Ref
2019	Zee Cine Awards	Best Playback Singer (male)	Naino Ne Bandhi from Gold (2018 film)	Won	
