= Asmita Sood =

Indian model and actress

- Born: Shimla, Himachal Pradesh, India
- Occupations: Actress; Model
- Years active: 2010–2023

Asmita Sood is an Indian model and actress. She made her acting debut with the 2011 Telugu film Brahmi Gadi Katha. Sood has endorsed over 40 brands. She has been a part of two television shows: Star Plus's Phir Bhi Na Maane...Badtameez Dil and Sony TV's Dil Hi Toh Hai.

== Early life ==
Asmita Sood hails from Shimla, Himachal Pradesh. She is a commerce graduate. She is married to Sidhh Mehta.

== Career ==
=== Modeling career ===
Sood started her modelling career towards the end of 2010 after participating in TV reality show Channel V's Get Gorgeous. She later participated in the 2011 Femina Miss India beauty pageant, ending up as one of the finalists. She is a professionally trained Kathak dancer.

=== Film career ===
Sood made her acting debut with a Telugu film Brahmi Gadi Katha (2011), which also stars Varun Sandesh in the lead role. It had a 50-day box office run. In 2013, Sood debuted in Kannada films with Victory, which also stars Sharan in the lead role. It was followed by her Malayalam debut in the anthology 5 Sundarikal in which she played Ami, a Muslim girl who gets married at a young age.

She was next seen opposite Sudheer Babu in the Telugu film Aadu Magaadra Bujji. In the film she played Indu, a "bubbly and chirpy college-goer". Sood's following releases were Aa Aiduguru (2014), in which she was seen as a police officer, and Ok (2013). In 2015, she was shooting for her second Malayalam film, Lukka Chuppi.

=== Television career ===
She also worked in a Hindi show Phir Bhi Na Maane...Badtameez Dil on Star Plus as Meher Purohit opposite Pearl V Puri. She was about to play the role of Gauri in Qayamat Ki Raat, but later on Karishma Tanna was finalized to play the role. In 2018, She was seen as Setu in Sony TV's Dil Hi Toh Hai which ended in 2020. From November 2022 to February 2023, she played the negative role, Trishala in Dangal show Janam Janam Ka Saath opposite Gaurav S Bajaj.

=== Music videos ===
She appeared in the music videos Filhall (2019) with Akshay Kumar.

== Filmography ==
=== Films ===
Year	Title	Role	Language	Notes
2011	Brahmi Gadi Katha	Maya / Shwetha	Telugu	Telugu Debut film
2013	Victory	Priya	Kannada	Kannada Debut film
2013	5 Sundarikal	Aami	Malayalam	Malayalam Debut film
2013	Aadu Magaadra Bujji	Indu	Telugu	
2014	Ok	Bujji	Telugu	
2014	Aa Aiduguru	Police Officer	Telugu	
2014	Adyaksha	Kalyani	Kannada	Guest appearance
2015	Lukka Chuppi	Radhika	Malayalam	
2018	Victory 2	Priya	Kannada	

=== Television shows ===
Year	Title	Role	Language	Channel
2010	Get Gorgeous	Contestant	Hindi	Channel V
2015	Phir Bhi Na Maane...Badtameez Dil	Meher Purohit	Hindi	Star Plus
2018–2020	Dil Hi Toh Hai	Shweta "Setu" Pathak	Hindi	Sony TV/ALT Balaji
2022–2023	Janam Janam Ka Saath	Trishala	Hindi	Dangal

=== Web series ===
Year	Title	Role	Platform	Notes	Ref.
2020	Poison 2	Tina	ZEE5	Debut web series	

=== Music videos ===
Year	Song	Singer	Co-Starring
2019	Filhall	B Praak	Akshay Kumar
