= Astitva...Ek Prem Kahani =

2002 Indian TV series

- Directed by: Ajai Sinha
- Starring: see below
- Theme music composer: Pritam
- Opening theme: "Astitva" by Mahalaxmi Iyer
- Country of origin: India
- No. of episodes: 668

Production
- Producer: Sangita Sinha
- Running time: 22 minutes

Original release
- Network: Zee TV
- Release: 17 November 2002 – 13 January 2006

Astitva – Ek Prem Kahani (transl. 'Existence – a love story') is a Hindi soap opera and drama that aired on the Zee TV channel from 17 November 2002 to 13 January 2006. The story focuses the character of Dr. Simran, who navigates struggles in her personal and professional life. She is a gynecologist who enters a complex situation when she marries a man ten years younger than herself.

== Synopsis ==
Dr. Simran Mathur, a renowned gynecologist, is the eldest child of senior government officer Saurabh and homemaker Padma. Simran has two younger sisters, Kavita and Rashmi, and Simran’s parents worry about their eldest daughter being unmarried and in her mid-thirties. The show progresses with Simran falling in love, with a man ten years younger than her, named Abhi.

Simran and Abhi eventually face problems in their relationship, and face criticism for their age difference and choices throughout the show. The series covers the issues of gender roles, marital issues, familial relationships, and personal identity.

== Cast ==
- Niki Aneja Walia as Dr. Simran Mathur / Dr. Simran Saxena, Saurabh and Padma's daughter Abhi's first and fourth wife, Sia's original mother, Aastha and Yash's adopted mother
- Varun Badola as Abhimanyu Saxena a.k.a. Abhi (Dr. Simran's husband) / Writer Anand, Simran's, Kiran's and Neha's husband, Saurabh and Padma's son-in-law, Sia, Yash and Aastha's father
- Ajit Mehra as Mr. Mehta (Mehta Sab) (Abhimanyu Saxena / Anand and Bhavani's publisher) in Goa
- Komal Kumari as Baby Aastha
- Yuvika Chaudhary as Aastha Saxena (Abhi and Neha's daughter - dead, died in bomb blast)
- Upasana Shukla as Sia Saxena / Aastha Saxena / Aastha Siddhant Awasthi (Abhi and Simran's daughter; she changes her name from Sia to Aastha in memory of her late sister Aastha)
- Vineeta Thakur as Neha (Abhi's third wife - dead, died soon after pregnancy and giving birth to Aastha)
- Rajendra Chawla as Bhavani Shankar; Abhimanyu Saxena (Anand)'s friend
- Alok Nath as Saurabh Mathur (Padma's husband, Simran, Kavita and Rashmi's father, Abhi, Rohit and Pranay's father-in-law)
- Harshada Khanvilkar as Shaguna (Simran's housekeeper)
- Harsh Chhaya as Dr. Manas Awasthi (Simran's friend, Urmila's husband and Sid's father)
- Bhairavi Raichura as Urmila (Manas's wife, Sid's mother)
- Neeru Bajwa / Kamya Panjabi as Kiran (Abhi's second wife and Yash's mother)
- Abbas Khan / Vishal Singh as Dr. Siddhant Awasthi a.k.a. Sid (Manas and Urmila's son; Aastha (Siya)'s husband; Abhi and Simran's son-in-law)
- Susheel Parashar as Mr. Saxena (Abhi's father, Simran's father-in-law)
- Kanika Shivpuri as Mrs. Saxena (Abhi's mother, Simran's mother-in-law)
- Parmeet Sethi as Dr. Brian
- Himani Shivpuri as Radha; Neha's mother, Aastha's (Abhi and Neha's daughter)'s grandmother
- Mahesh Thakur as Dr. Abhimanyu Joshi a.k.a. Manu
- Sindhu Tolani / Aanchal Saxena / Firdaus Dadi as Rashmi; Simran's sister
- Nitesh Pandey as Dr. Pranay (Rashmi's second husband)
- Resham Tipnis / Payal Nair as Kavita (Simran's sister) - dead, died soon after pregnancy
- Sanjeev Seth as Rohit (Kavita's husband)
- Nandita Puri as Padma (Saurabh's wife, Simran, Kavita and Rashmi's mother, Abhi, Rohit and Pranay's mother-in-law) - dead, died in sleep
- Sunita (TV actress)|Sunita as Anandi; Mr. and Mrs. Saxena's daughter; Abhi's sister - dead, died soon after pregnancy
- Ninad Kamat as Anandi's husband
- Iqbal Azad/Imran Khan as Dr. Ashwin (Urmila's lover) - dead
- Sonica Handa as Naghma (Manu's wife)
- Anjali Mukhi as Gauri Joshi (Manu's sister)
- Naveen Bawa as Dr. Abhimanyu Joshi's elder brother
- Shalini Arora as Dr. Abhimanyu Joshi's sister-in-law
- Manju (actress)|Manju as Dr. Meena
- Monaz Mevawala as Amisha Dalaal
- Abha Dhulia as Dr. Sarla Dalaal
- Neena Cheema as Sulochana
- Pallavi Joshi as Leela
- Mrinal Kulkarni as Dr. Sakshi, Yash's girlfriend - dead, died in car accident
- Raja Sevak as Dr. Sakshi's husband
- Amit Raj as Yash Saxena, Abhi and Kiran's son; Dr. Sakshi's boyfriend; Simran's adoptive son
- Malvika Shivpuri / Ananya Banerjee as Poonam
- Nagesh Bhonsle as Shankar, Shaguna's husband
- Mushtaq Merchant as Nishant
- Trishna Vivek as Hospital Receptionist
- Tisca Chopra as Rhea
- Kiran Randhawa as Kiran's landlady
- Kavita Vaid as Nurse Leela
- Kunal Kumar as Rahul
- Mukesh Tiwari as Rashmi's father-in-law
- Seema Shinde as Dr. Simran Mathur / Dr. Simran Saxena's assistant
- Naresh Suri as Satya, Amla's husband; Saurabh's brother-in-law
- Anju Mahendru as Amla, Satya's wife; Saurabh's sister; Simran, Kavita and Rashmi's aunt
- Vivek Gomber as Harsh
- Suzanne Bernert as Catherine
- Shalaka Ranadive as Archana Sareen - Sia (Aastha's kidnapper) dead, died in hospital after a car accident
- Seema Bhargava as Archana's mother, Sia's grandmother
- Natasha Rana as Dr. Brian's wife
- Akshay Anand as Anil Shourey, Kiran's ex-boyfriend
- Daya Shankar Pandey as Inspector
- Richa Bhattacharya as Patient
- Romit Raj as Yash Kapoor (Saxena)
- Avdhesh Kushwaha (Supporting Role)

== Production ==
The series had a crossover with Reth.

== Awards ==
2003 3rd Indian Television Academy Awards

Best Actress (Drama) - Niki Aneja Walia as Dr. Simran Mathur

Best Director (Drama) - Ajai Sinha

2005 2nd Apsara Awards

Best Drama Series - Astitva...Ek Prem Kahani

Best Actress - Niki Aneja Walia as Dr. Simran Mathur / Saxena

Best Actor - Varun Badola as Abhimanyu Saxena / Anand

2005 Indian Television Academy Awards

Best Actor (Drama) - Varun Badola as Abhimanyu Saxena / Anand

Best Teleplay - Astitva...Ek Prem Kahani - Gajra Kottary & Purnendu Shekhar
