= Suvreen Guggal – Topper of The Year =

- Created by: Alind Srivastava Deepali Junjappa Faizal Akhtar
- Written by: Faizal Akhtar; Aparajita Sharma (Dialogues) Divy Nidhi Sharma (Dialogues)
- Directed by: Ravi Bhushan
- Creative director: Alind Srivastava
- Starring: Smriti Kalra; Shivin Narang
- Country of origin: India
- Original language: Hindi
- No. of seasons: 2
- No. of episodes: 380

Production
- Producers: Gul Khan; Nissar Parvez; Gorky; Shakti Sagar Chopra
- Production companies: 4 Lions Films; Fable Tree Pictures

Original release
- Network: Channel V India
- Release: 19 March 2012 – 22 November 2013

Suvreen Guggal – Topper of The Year is an Indian TV drama series that aired on Channel V India. It is the fourth television series of 4 Lions Films. The program premiered on 19 March 2012.

== Plot ==
=== Season I ===
Topper of the Year is an inspiring, rousing coming of age tale of a generation of youngsters studying at DPSC (Devendra Pratap Singh College), a prestigious college in Delhi. It's a humorous and riveting campus drama that states that there's more to this Facebook generation than iPod and low-waist jeans. It showcases how Suvreen faces difficulties and finally becomes a fashion designer.

=== Season II ===
Season 2 follows how Suvreen leaves her home, struggles and finds a foothold in the fashion industry. She is still not so established, but she still faces many problems in different fields while trying to make a mark. She also adopts the name Pepper Pathak and runs her own brand, hiding it from everyone except her boyfriend Yuvraj and roommate Soni. The story showcases how she solves all her problems, maintains a balance between her home and work and tries to make everyone happy, including her parents, boyfriend and friends. She goes to Paris for her four-year course. She returns to Kathgodam, India and opens her own boutique. On the day of the inauguration, Yuvraj proposes marriage, and she happily accepts.

== Cast ==
- Smriti Kalra as Suvreen "Suvi" Guggal: Baldev and Lovely's elder daughter; Jasleen's elder sister
- Shivin Narang as Yuvraj "Yuvi" Singh
- Karam Rajpal as Samar Raghuvanshi
- Sadhana Sharma as Sakshi Singh: Yuvraj's sister
- Heli Daruwala as Alisha Diwan
- Mohit Malik as Rehan Charles
- Vartika Chauhan as Amanpreet Sehgal
- Karishma Rawat as Naro
- Vibhu K Raghave as Rohan
- Abhishek Sharma as Rathi
- Raghu Raja Bhatia as Mannu
- Viren Vazirani as Vivan
- Akshay Anand as Baldev Guggal: Lovely's husband; Suvreen and Jasleen's father
- Ekta Sharma as Lovely Baldev Guggal: Baldev's wife; Suvreen and Jasleen's mother
- Mansi Srivastava as Jasleen Guggal: Baldev and Lovely's younger daughter; Suvreen's younger sister
- Shuhaib Embichi as Anish Nayar
- Disha Thakur as Tultuli
- Simple Kaul as Ira Sahni
- Praneet Bhat as Jolly
- Sonia Balani as Soni Chaddha: Suvreen's roommate
- Hitesh Bharadwaj as Zorro
- Riney Aryaa as Riya
- Nishant Pandey as Shawn; Leader of the Magic Band; Elder brother to Abigail Pande
