= Aadu Magaadra Bujji =

- Film poster
- Directed by: Krishna Reddy Gangadhasuu
- Written by: Padmasri Nandyala
- Produced by: M. Subbareddy; S. N. Reddy
- Starring: Sudheer Babu; Asmita Sood; Ajay; Randhir Gattla; Poonam Kaur
- Cinematography: Santonio Terzio
- Edited by: Tammiraju
- Music by: Sri
- Production companies: Colors & Claps Entertainments
- Distributed by: USA Telugumovie Portal
- Release date: 7 December 2013
- Running time: 144 minutes
- Country: India
- Language: Telugu

Aadu Magaadra Bujji is a 2013 Indian Telugu-language romantic action comedy film directed by debutante director Krishna Reddy Gangadhasuu and starring Sudheer Babu, Asmita Sood and Poonam Kaur in the lead roles. Music is composed by Sri.

== Plot ==
Siddhu (Sudheer Babu), a naughty easy-going guy, falls in love with Indu (Asmita Sood). But Indu is the sister of Cherry (Ranadheer), who keeps on protecting his sister from others’ eyes. But on the other hand, Cherry loves Anjali (Poonam Kaur), the sister-in-law of a dangerous man Bujji aka Shankar (Ajay). How things move among these people, how Siddhu plays with Shankar forms the main story.

== Cast ==
- Sudheer Babu as Siddhu
- Asmita Sood as Indu
- Ajay as Shankar Anna
- Randhir Gattla as Cherry
- Poonam Kaur as Anjali
- Suman
- Naresh as Siddhu's father
- Prudhviraj
- Krishna Bhagavaan
- Suman Setty
- Chanti
- Saikumar Pampana
- Karate Kalyani
- Rachana Maurya (item song)

== Production ==
It was announced to Sudheer Babu to do this movie in March 2012. Shooting started on 11 May 2013. Krishna Reddy is debuting as director with this film in Telugu film industry. He earlier worked as co-director for S. S. Rajamouli films. The logo and first look of this film were released on 9 August 2013.

== Soundtrack ==
Sri composed the music.

Track list
Song title	Singers	Lyricist	Duration	Description
"Adede Tholiprema"	Rahul Nambiar, Priya Himesh	Ananta Sriram	4:18	Sudheer Babu and Asmita Sood
"Andala Haseenaa"	Priya Himesh, M. L. R. Karthikeyan	Balaji	4:17	Sudheer Babu and Asmita Sood
"Chikati Padithe Cheeroddu"	Sri Kommineni, Priyadarshini	Chirravoori Vijayakumar	4:10	Item song on Sudheer Babu and Rachana Maurya
" Osi Nee Andaalu"	Karthik, Ramya NSK	Balaji	4:47	Sudheer Babu and Asmita Sood
" Oh Preyasi Monalisaa"	M. L. R. Karthikeyan, Priyadarshini	Balaji	4:43	Sudheer Babu and Asmita Sood

== Release ==
The film was released worldwide on 7 December 2013.
