= Janam Janam Ka Saath =

Indian drama television series

- Genre: Drama; Romance
- Starring: Gaurav S Bajaj; Pankit Thakker; Neeraj Malviya; Nikki Sharma; Sneha Jain; Asmita Sood; Aasiya Kazi
- Country of origin: India
- Original language: Hindi
- No. of seasons: 1
- No. of episodes: 186

Production
- Camera setup: Multi-camera
- Running time: 22-24 minutes
- Production company: Full House Production

Original release
- Network: Dangal
- Release: 14 November 2022 – 17 June 2023

Janam Janam Ka Saath is an Indian Hindi-language television drama series that premiered from 14 November 2022 on Dangal. Produced under Full House Production, it starred Pankit Thakker, Neeraj Malviya, Sneha Jain, Aasiya Kazi, Gaurav S Bajaj, Nikki Sharma and Asmita Sood. It ended on 17 June 2023.

== Plot ==
The story revolves around the second coming of two protagonists who were separated but there love was so strong that fate has given them a second chance as Vidhi and Abir. Now Vidhi is a poor shoemaker and Abir is a prince of sorts. Both are arranged to be married with other people but destiny brings them together to finish the love story remained unfulfilled in their last birth. All sorts of trouble, jealousy and plotting goes on against the both of them in the serial yet sparks fly and they start falling for each other again.

== Cast ==
=== Main ===
- Sneha Jain as
  - Vidhi Vansh Raghuvanshi (After Plastic Surgery): Abir's widow; Dr. Vansh's wife; Abir Raghuvanshi's stepmother; Rimjhim's mother (2023)
  - Vidhi Mathur: Arvind and Sanjeevani's daughter (2023) (Dead)
- Neeraj Malviya as Dr. Vansh Raghuvanshi: Siya and Vidhi's husband; Abir Raghuvanshi's father; Sarala's son-in-law; Rimjhim's stepfather (2023)
- Nikki Sharma as
  - Vidhi Bansal / Vidhi Abir Tomar / Vidhi Vansh Raghuvanshi (Before Plastic Surgery): (in this birth) (2022–2023)
  - Bhanumati: Abir's lover (previous birth)
- Gaurav S Bajaj as
  - Abir Tomar: Vidhi's first husband; Avni's husband; Dr. Karuna's son; Rimjhim's father (in this birth) (2022–2023) (Dead)
  - Adinath: Bhanumati's lover (in previous birth)

- Pankit Thakker as Vishwas Kunwar Sa: Sunainas husband; Nishants stepfather (2022-2023)

=== Recurring ===
- Aasiya Kazi as Siya Vansh Raghuvanshi: Vansh's first wife; Abir Raghuvanshi's mother; Sarala's elder daughter; Ginni's elder sister; a terrorist; Sameer's crime partner (2023) (Antagonist)
- Asmita Sood as
  - Trishala: Abir's former fiancée (in this birth) (2022–2023) (Antagonist)
  - Shaguna (in previous birth)
- Pankit Thakker as Vishwas "Kunwar Sa": Sunaina's second husband; Nishant's stepfather (2022–2023)
- Rakshanda Khan as Dr. Karuna Tomar: Abir's mother; Rimjhim's grandmother (2022–2023) (Dead)
- Ginnie Virdi as Sunaina: Vishwas's wife; Nishant's mother (2022–2023)
- Eva Grover as Trishala's mother (2022)
- Ayaz Ahmed as Nishant Tomar: Sunaina's son; Vishwas's stepson; Ginni's husband (2022–2023)
- Miloni Kapadia as Avni Abir Tomar: Abir's second wife (2023)
- Kaushal Kapoor as Mr. Tomar: Dr. Karuna and Sunaina's father–in–law; Abir and Nishant's grandfather (2022–2023) (Dead)
- Reyansh Jaisinghani as Abir Raghuvanshi "Junior": Dr. Vansh and Siya's son; Vidhi's stepson; Sarala's maternal grandson; Rimjhim's elder stepbrother (2023)
- Asmita Sharma as Sarala: Siya and Ginni's mother; Dr. Vansh's mother-in-law; Abir Raghuvanshi's maternal grandmother (2023)
- Simran Sharma as Ginni Nishant Tomar: Sarala's younger daughter; Siya's younger sister; Abir Raghuvanshi's maternal aunt (masi); Nishant's wife (2023)
- Mahi Bhadra as Rimjhim Tomar: Abir and Vidhi's daughter; Dr. Vansh and Siya's stepdaughter; Abir Raghuvanshi's younger stepsister (2023)
- Urvashi Upadhyay as Inspector Sanjeevani Arvind Nautiyal: Arvind's wife; Vidhi Mathur's mother (2023)
- Nishad Vaidya as Sameer "Lucky": Vansh's college friend; a terrorist; Siya's crime partner (2023)
- Unknown as C.P. Arvind Nautiyal: Sanjeevani's husband; Vidhi Mathur's father (2023) (Dead)

== Production ==
=== Development ===
The show title is based on the song from the 1969 film Tumse Achha Kaun Hai. The shooting of the series began in Jodhpur in November 2022.

The series marks comeback for Asmita Sood into fiction after COVID-19 pandemic.

=== Casting ===
Gaurav S Bajaj was cast for the male lead. Nikki Sharma was signed as the female lead.

Asmita Sood was cast to portray the negative lead and joined by Pankit Thakker. In March 2023, Gaurav S Bajaj Quit the Show and in May 2023, Nikki Sharma Quit the show.

=== Release ===
Janam Janam Ka Saath promos were released in November 2022. It premeried on 14 November 2022 on Dangal.

== See also ==
- List of programmes broadcast by Dangal TV
