= Niki Aneja Walia =

Indian television actress

Niki Walia
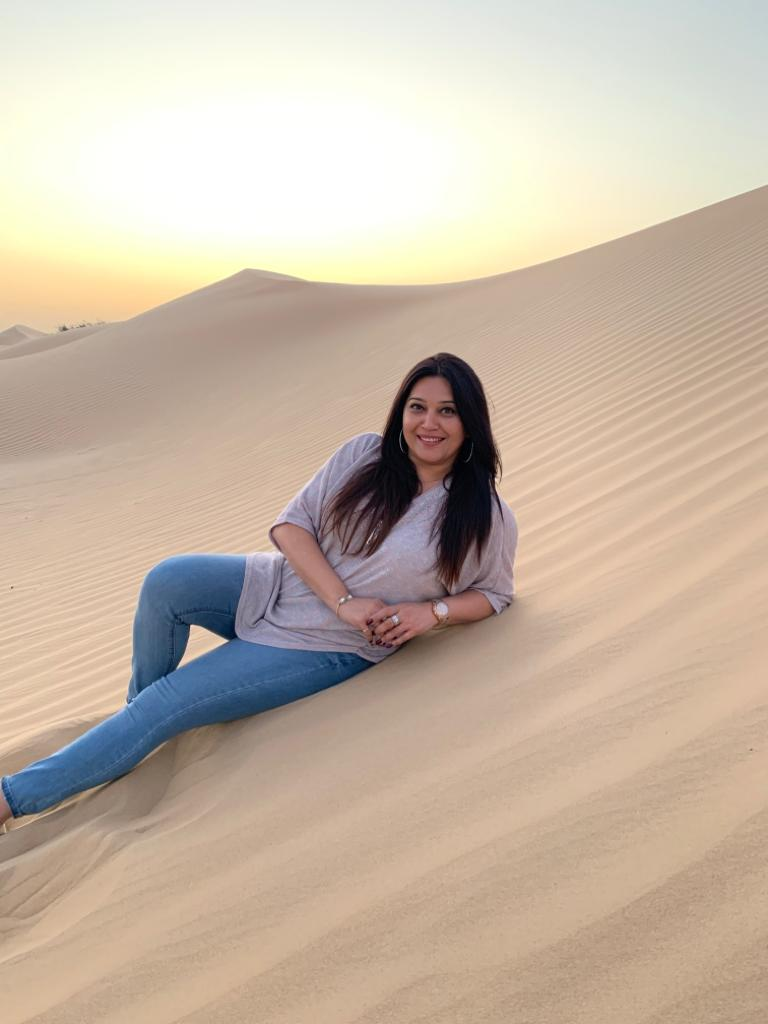
- Walia in 2019
- Born: 26 September 1972 (age 53); Mumbai, Maharashtra, India
- Education: St. Teresa's Convent School, Santacruz
- Occupation: Actress
- Years active: 1994–present
- Spouse: Sonny Walia (m. 2002)
- Children: 2
- Relatives: Parmeet Sethi (cousin)

Niki Walia (née Aneja; born 26 September 1972) is an Indian television and film actress who works in Hindi films and television serials. She is the cousin of actor Parmeet Sethi.

== Personal life ==
She married Sonny Walia in February 2002 and moved to the UK the same year. The couple has twins (a boy, Sean and a girl, Sabrina). She currently resides in England.

== Career ==
Niki has worked as a model, compere, VJ, host and actress on television and film (Cinema, Netflix and Amazon Prime) (Bollywood). She has acted for over 30 years in over 31 television serials across genres.

She is best known for her role as Dr. Simran Mathur in the Hindi TV series Astitva...Ek Prem Kahani on Zee TV. She played the role of Nikki in Zee TV serial "Baat ban jaye"

== Filmography ==
=== Films ===
| Year | Film | Role | Notes | Ref. |
|---|---|---|---|---|
| 1994 | Mr. Azaad | Inspector Shalu | Debut film (as Shalu Aneja) | |
| 1998 | Mohre | Agent Roochi | | |
| 1999 | Chocolate | | | |
| 2015 | Shaandaar | Geetu Arora | | |
| 2017 | Lupt | Shalini Tandon | | |
| 2020 | Guilty | Sushma Singh | Netflix film | |
| 2021 | Virgin Bhanupriya | Moon | ZEE5 film | |
| 2021 | Bawri Chhori | | Eros Now film | |
| 2021 | Tuesdays and Fridays | Dr. Radhika Malhotra | | |
| 2022 | Tara vs Bilal | Daisy Aunty | | |
| 2022 | Double XL | Zorawar's Mother | | |
| 2023 | Neeyat | Zara, AK's therapist | | |
| TBA | Laila Majnu † | TBA | | |

=== Web series ===
| Year | Title | Role | Platform |
|---|---|---|---|
| 2018-2021 | Puncch Beat | Maya | ALTBalaji |
| 2020 | Never Kiss Your Best Friend | Harpreet Brar | ZEE5 |
| 2021 | "Never Kiss Your Best Friend Lockdown Special" | Harpreet Brar | ZEE5 |
| 2022 | Never Kiss Your Best Friend Season 2 | Harpreet Brar | ZEE5 |

=== Television ===
| Year | Show | Role | Notes | Ref. |
|---|---|---|---|---|
| 1995 | Baat Ban Jaye | | | |
| 1996 | Sea Hawks | Naval officer Dr. Natasha | | |
| 1996 | Andaz | | | |
| 1996 | Dastaan | | | |
| 1996 | Aakhir Kaun | | | |
| 1999 | Saher | | | |
| 2000 | Samandar | | | |
| 2000 | Piya Binaa | | | |
| 2001 | Gharwaali Uparwaali | Pooja | | |
| 2002-2006 | Astitva...Ek Prem Kahani | Dr. Simran Mathur / Dr. Simran Saxena | | |
| 2002-2006 | Piya Ka Ghar | Dr. Simran Mathur / Dr. Simran Saxena | | |
| 2006 | Barrister Roy | Niki | | |
| 2009 | Zee & U. | Herself / Presenter | | |
| 2009 | Ghar Ek Sapnaa | Simi | Special Appearance | |
| 2012 | Cloud 9 | Nisha | | |
| 2017 | Dil Sambhal Jaa Zara | Laila Raichand | | |
