= Ateet =

Indian Hindi Language film

- Directed by: Tanuj Bhramar
- Written by: Harsshil R Patel
- Produced by: Anil Somani; Pramod Goyal; Anup Todi; Ashish Wagh
- Starring: Priyamani Raj; Sanjay Suri; Rajeev Khandelwal
- Cinematography: Mukesh G.
- Edited by: Mayur Hardas
- Music by: Andrew T. Mackay; Harish Sagne
- Distributed by: ZEE5
- Release date: 21 April 2020
- Country: India
- Language: Hindi

Ateet is a 2020 Indian Hindi-language war drama film starring Priyamani which streams on ZEE5. It is a story of a soldier who was lost in a war and declared dead, after several years he returns to his family, now a question occurs whether he is alive or dead.

== Plot ==
The story is about Captain Ateet Rana who was declared killed in action, Vishwa Karma his senior decides to take care of his wife Janvi and daughter Sana. After 10 years of hiding details about Ateet from Sana, in a twist of fate Ateet Rana returns and wants his family back and is ready to expose a dark truth about his senior Vishwa Karma.

== Cast ==
- Priyamani as Janvi
- Sanjay Suri as Vishwa Karma
- Rajeev Khandelwal as Ateet Rana
- Vipin Sharma as Dr. Masood

== Soundtrack ==
The soundtrack is composed by Harish Sagne. Lyrics is written by Shakeel Azmi

No.	Title	Singer(s)	Length
1.	"Zara Kareeb Aa"	Sonu Nigam, Yamini Sri Devi	5:58
2.	"Akele Mein"	Yasser Desai	4:11
3.	"Akele Mein" (Reprise)	Sonu Kakkar	3:49
Total length:			18:46
