= Gulmohar Grand =

- Genre: Drama
- Created by: Sudhir Sharma; Seema Sharma
- Country of origin: India
- Original language: Hindi
- No. of episodes: 17

Production
- Producers: Sudhir Sharma; Seema Sharma
- Production locations: Mumbai, Maharashtra, India
- Camera setup: Multi-camera
- Running time: 48 Minutes approx
- Production company: Sunshine Productions

Original release
- Network: StarPlus
- Release: 3 May – 13 September 2015

Gulmohar Grand is an Indian television miniseries that premiered on 3 May 2015 on StarPlus. The show is produced by Sunshine Productions which aired on Sundays nights. Aashim Gulati, Aakanksha Singh and Gaurav Chopra were the leads of the series.

This is a mini series, set in backdrop of the hotel industry, wherein each episode will have a different story.

== Cast ==
=== Main ===
- Aakanksha Singh as Staff Anahita "Annie" Mehta/Fernandez
- Aashim Gulati as Security Manager Neel Gujral
- Gaurav Chopra as MD Aniruddh Dutt

=== Recurring ===
- Madan Joshi as Owner Mr. K. K. Jaitley
- Harleen Sethi as Staff Tina
- Teeshay Shah as Manager Teeshay
- Rashi Mal as Staff Saloni
- Garima Goel as Secretary Rishita
- Nikhil Diwan as Head of Security Ronnie D'Souza

=== Special appearances ===
- Parikshit Sahni as Mr. Devdhar
- Karan Grover as Charlie: The Mysterious Scarf Killer
- Deven Bhojani as Mr. Gopal
- Pratyusha Banerjee as Parinda Pathak
- Shubhangi Atre Poorey as Mrs. Kadambari Karthik
- Divya Verma as Mrs. Sampada Deshpande
- Pooja Kanwal as Mrs. Mayuri Jaitley Fernandez
- Shalmalee Desai as Avanti Devdhar
- Manini Mishra

== Production ==
The series was planned for 26 episodes. However, due to low ratings, it ended with 17 episodes.

The series was filmed in Imperial Palace, a hotel in Mumbai, Maharashtra. On its premiere, a launch party was held at a restaurant in Andheri, Mumbai.
