= Smriti Kalra =

Indian television actress (born 1987)

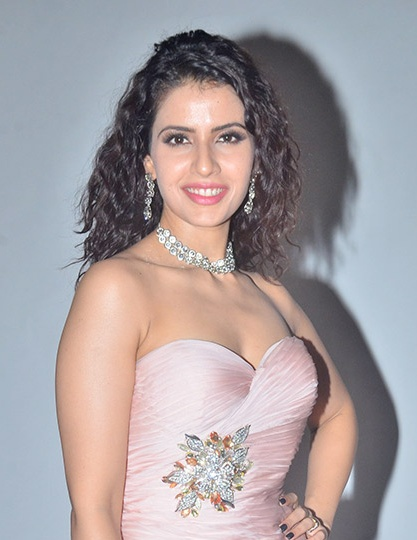
- Kalra in 2021
- Born: 26 October 1987 (age 38); New Delhi, Delhi, India
- Education: IIM Calcutta
- Occupation: Actress
- Years active: 2009–present
- Known for: Cash; 12/24 Karol Bagh; Suvreen Guggal – Topper of The Year; Dil Sambhal Jaa Zara

Smriti Kalra is an Indian actress and model. She first appeared as a lead in 12/24 Karol Bagh as Simmi on Zee TV. She got fame with the title role in Channel V India's serial Suvreen Guggal – Topper of The Year. She was also seen in show Dil Sambhal Jaa Zara as Ahana on StarPlus. Her debut film Cash released on Disney+ Hotstar.

== Career ==
She made her acting debut with 12/24 Karol Bagh in which she played the role of Simmi. In 2012, she played the role of Suvreen, a college girl, in the show Suvreen Guggal – Topper of The Year. In 2014, she played the critically acclaimed role of Neha in the show Itti Si Khushi on Sony TV. This show was about a woman of 26 years old with the mind and behaviour of a 16-year-old because of memory loss. In 2015, She hosted the 5th season of the show Pyaar Tune Kya Kiya along with Parth Samthaan on Zing TV. In 2017, she worked in the short film Cup of Tea which received the official selection and nomination in over 72 international film festivals and won many awards including the 2nd best short film award at the EduDoc International Short Film Competition and was the official selection for the 20th International children film festival India 2017.

In 2017, she appeared opposite Sanjay Kapoor in Dil Sambhal Jaa Zara, a television series set in the backdrop of modern-age romance.

In 2019, she co-directed the award-winning shortfilm Ambu in which she played both a man and woman.The film was a part of the 10 best 48 Hour Film Project films contingent that went to Filmapalooza 2019 in Orlando.

In 2020, she was seen in the short film Unlocked: The Stranger which is the first of a series of 5 short films made during the COVID-19 lockdown written and directed by Abhijit Das.

== Filmography ==
=== Films ===
Year	Title	Role	Notes	Ref.
2017	Cup of Tea	Tourist	Short film	
2019	Lights Out	Leela		
2019	Ambu	Ambu	Also writer and director	
2020	Unlocked: The Stranger		Short film	
2021	Cash	Neha		
2023	Darran Chhoo	Dolly		
2024	Kaagaz 2	Tanisha		

=== Television ===
Year	Title	Role	Notes	Ref.
2009–2010	12/24 Karol Bagh	Simran "Simi" Sethi Taneja		
2010	Meethi Choori No 1	Contestant		
2012–2013	Suvreen Guggal – Topper of The Year	Suvreen "Suvi" Guggal		
2014–2015	Itti Si Khushi	Neha		
2015	Pyaar Tune Kya Kiya	Host	Season 5	
2017–2018	Dil Sambhal Jaa Zara	Ahana Raichand Mathur		

==== Special appearances ====
Year	Title	Role	Ref.
2009	Saat Phere – Saloni Ka Safar	Simran "Simi" Sethi	
2009	Chotti Bahu	Simran "Simi" Sethi	
2014	Kaun Banega Crorepati	Herself	
2017	Ishqbaaaz	Ahana Raichand	
2020	Fear Factor: Khatron Ke Khiladi 10	Herself	

=== Music videos ===
Year	Title	Singer(s)	Album	Ref.
2020	Khoobseerat	Suyyash Rai		
2021	Jogiya	Shibani Kashyap		
2021	Humsafar	Suyyash Rai	Musical series: "Aakhiri Mulaqaat"	
2021	Pyaar Ke Saleeqe	Lakshay, Aakanksha Sharma	Musical series: "Aakhiri Mulaqaat"	
2021	Ghalat	Himani Kapoor	Musical series: "Aakhiri Mulaqaat"	
2022	Aakhiri Mulaqaat	Suyyash Rai	Musical series: "Aakhiri Mulaqaat"	
2022	Dheere Dheere Tumse Pyaar Hogaya	Stebin Ben		

== Awards and nominations ==
Year	Award	Category	Work	Result
2010	Indian Telly Awards	Fresh New Face (Actress)	12/24 Karol Bagh	Nominated
