= Poonam Kaur =

Indian actress and model

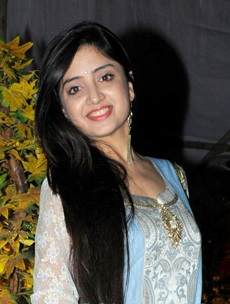
- Born: Hyderabad, Telangana, India
- Other names: Deepa; Nakshatra
- Occupations: Actress; model
- Years active: 2006–present

Poonam Kaur is an Indian actress and model who primarily appears in Telugu and Tamil films. She is also a politician, based in Telangana and a member of the Congress Party.

== Career ==
Born and raised in Hyderabad, India, Poonam Kaur did her schooling in Hyderabad Public School, before doing fashion designing at the National Institute of Fashion Technology (NIFT) in Delhi. In 2006, after her studies, she signed up for a film to be directed by Teja, which didn't take off for unknown reason. However, she took an offer for another Teja film, Oka Vichitram. Even before the release of that film, Kaur was pursuing a lead role in another Telugu film, Mayajalam, which released first.

Subsequently, she appeared in several Telugu films as Nikki And Neeraj, enacting the title role of Nikki, and in Souryam, alongside Gopichand and Anushka Shetty. For her performance in the latter, Kaur received a nomination for the Best Supporting Actress Award for 2008. She made her acting debut in the Tamil and Kannada film industries, with S. A. Chandrasekhar's Nenjirukkum Varai and Bandhu Balaga, respectively. In 2010, she made a comeback in Tamil with the highly anticipated Unnaipol Oruvan, a remake of the 2008 Bollywood film, A Wednesday!, in which she played a small supporting role alongside Kamal Haasan and Mohanlal. Recently, she was nominated as a brand ambassador for the Miss Telangana event.

== Filmography ==
Year	Film	Role	Language	Notes
2006	Mayajalam	Swati Rajender	Telugu	Credited as Deepa (Telugu Debut)
2006	Oka `V` Chitram	Deepa	Telugu	
2007	Nikki And Neeraj	Nikki	Telugu	
2007	Nenjirukkum Varai	Bhuvana Rangasamy Naidu	Tamil	Credited as Deepa (Tamil Debut)
2008	Souryam	Divya	Telugu	Nominated, Filmfare Award for Best Supporting Actress – Telugu
2008	Bandhu Balaga	Lakshmi	Kannada	Kannada Debut
2008	Vinayakudu	Sandhya (Sandy)	Telugu	
2009	Unnaipol Oruvan	Anu Sethuraman	Tamil	
2009	Eenadu	Anu Gautham	Telugu	
2009	Ganesh	Deepa	Telugu	
2010	Nagavalli	Pooja	Telugu	
2011	Payanam	Air Hostess Vimala Gupta	Tamil	
2011	Gaganam	Air Hostess Vimala Gupta	Telugu	Nominated, Filmfare Award for Best Supporting Actress – Telugu
2011	Brahmi Gadi Katha	Bhagya	Telugu	
2011	Vedi	Aishwarya	Tamil	
2013	6	Lizzy	Tamil	
2013	Bangles	Avanthika	Malayalam	Malayalam Debut
2013	Aadu Magaadra Bujji	Anjali	Telugu	
2014	Poga		Telugu	
2015	En Vazhi Thani Vazhi	Saraswathi (Sarasu)	Tamil	
2015	Achaaram	Ramya	Tamil	
2015	Superstar Kidnap	Priya	Telugu	
2016	Attack	Sakhi	Telugu	
2016	Junooniyat	Kamya	Hindi	Hindi Debut
2016	Nayaki	Shravani	Telugu	Guest Appearance
2016	Nayagi	Shravani	Tamil	Guest Appearance
2018	Srinivasa Kalyanam	Kavya	Telugu	
2018	Next Enti?	Prachiti	Telugu	
2022	Nathicharami	Srilatha	Telugu	
2025	Bhoghee		Tamil	
TBA	3 Dev	Radha	Hindi	Delayed
TBA	Nandu En Nanban		Tamil	Delayed
TBA	Guest		Tamil	Delayed

== Television ==
Year	Title	Role	Language	Channel
2016	Super 2	Herself	Telugu	E TV Telugu
2016	Celebrity Danger	Herself	Telugu	Star Maa
2018–2019	Swarna Khadgam	Queen of Manipuram Vindhyavathi	Telugu	E TV Telugu
