= Brahmi Gadi Katha =

- Promotional poster
- Directed by: V. Eeshwar Reddy
- Written by: V. Eeshwar Reddy
- Produced by: Rajat Parthasarathy
- Starring: Varun Sandesh; Asmita Sood; Poonam Kaur; Brahmanandam
- Cinematography: Jawahar Reddy
- Edited by: Shankar
- Music by: Koti
- Production company: Multi-dimension Entertainments Pvt Ltd
- Release date: 1 July 2011
- Country: India
- Language: Telugu

Brahmi Gadi Katha (transl. Brahmi's story) is a 2011 Indian Telugu-language romantic comedy film directed by V. Eeshwar Reddy and starring Varun Sandesh, Asmita Sood, Poonam Kaur and Brahmanandam, who plays the titular role.

== Cast ==
- Varun Sandesh as Siva
- Asmita Sood as Maya / Shwetha
- Poonam Kaur as Bhagya
- Krishnudu as Pandu
- Brahmanandam as Brahmi
- Jaya Prakash Reddy as Siva's uncle (film producer)
- Nagineedu as Rowdy
- Ali as Brahmi's friend
- Radha Kumari as Bhagya's grandmother
- Prudhvi Raj as Producer's henchman
- Amit Tiwari as Rahul
- Surya as Murali Mohan from Vijayawada
- Chalapathi Rao as S. Praveen Kumar
- G. V. Sudhakar Naidu as Rowdy
- Naramalli Sivaprasad as Siva's father
- Sandhya Janak as Siva's mother
- Visweswara Rao as Travelling ticket examiner

== Production ==
As of April 2011, the entire film was shot except for two songs.

== Soundtrack ==
The soundtrack was composed by Koti.

Track listing
| No. | Title | Lyrics | Singer(s) | Length |
|---|---|---|---|---|
| 1. | "You Candyman" | Bandaru Danayya Kavi | Deepu, Geetha Madhuri | 3:01 |
| 2. | "Cheppaleni Maata" | Bhuvana Chandra | Anuj, Chaitra | 3:51 |
| 3. | "Life Is a Journey" | Venigalla Rambabu | N. C. Karunya | 4:40 |
| 4. | "Vellakala Vellakala" | Ramajogayya Sastry | Sri Krishna, Malavika | 2:51 |
| 5. | "Nee Akunene" | Suddala Ashok Teja | Geetha Madhuri, Hemachandra | 3:31 |
| Total length: | | | | 17:54 |

== Reception ==
A critic from Rediff.com rated the film two out of five stars and wrote that "Brammi Gadi Katha is watchable, once, for some of its hilarious scenes". Y. Sunita Chowdhary of The Hindu wrote, "Over all a well conceived story".
