= Dil Sambhal Jaa Zara =

Indian television series

- Genre: Drama; Romantic
- Starring: Sanjay Kapoor; Smriti Kalra; Niki Aneja Walia; Aashim Gulati
- Opening theme: "Jeene Bhi De'" by Yasser Desai
- Ending theme: "Ae Dil Na Kar Tu Chahate" by Soham Naik
- Composer: Harish Sagane
- Country of origin: India
- Original language: Hindi
- No. of seasons: 1
- No. of episodes: 75

Production
- Producer: Vikram Bhatt
- Production location: Mumbai
- Camera setup: Multi-camera
- Running time: 21 minutes

Original release
- Network: StarPlus
- Release: 23 October 2017 – 2 February 2018

Dil Sambhal Jaa Zara (transl. Be Careful My Heart) is an Indian drama television series broadcast on StarPlus from 23 October 2017 to 2 February 2018. The series was produced by Vikram Bhatt which starred Sanjay Kapoor and Smiriti Kalra. It is the remake of Turkish TV series Aşk-ı Memnu.

== Plot ==
Ahana Raichand (Smriti Kalra), a young woman, was always loved by her father. Her mother, Laila Raichand (Niki Aneja Walia), is a sly, ambitious, greedy woman who cheated on her husband. Ahana's father dies of shock taking his wife's betrayal too hard. Ahana witnesses their argument, thereby developing an intense hatred for her mother. Ahana, frustrated at her life at home after her father's death, finds solace in Anant Mathur (Sanjay Kapoor), a widowed friend of her father. Saloni Raichand (Cheshtha Bhagat), Ahana's elder sister, is about to be married to her sweetheart, Tarun Gupta (Puneet Sharma). Tarun's father, Mahendra Gupta (Indraneel Bhattacharya), is not keen on letting them get married since he is aware of Laila's gold-digging tendencies. He wants Saloni to sign a prenup. When Laila finds out she is infuriated and wants to cancel the wedding. The plot twist comes in the form of Saloni's pregnancy. Laila agrees to the wedding on the condition that Tarun provides 3 crore rupees to her. Tarun and Saloni get married. Meanwhile, Laila sets her eyes on marrying Anant as he is a rich businessman in order to pay off her debts and increase her social status. But Anant proposes to Ahana and they decide to get married. Rehaan Khanna (Aashim Gulati), son of Anant's friend, convinces Roshni, Anant's daughter, to give her blessings. Anant goes to Laila to ask for Ahana's hand in marriage. Laila is furious. She agrees to the marriage and puts forward a condition to Anant. As the story continues Ahana and Anant face many obstacles in their marriage due to the age difference, society, rivalry and family. Rehaan begins to fall for Ahana, while simultaneously learning that she married Anant just to defy and insult her mother for revenge. As he loves Anant who is like a father-figure to him, he doesn't want to see him cheated and tells Anant that Ahana didn't actually love him, not realizing that Ahana truly loves Anant and that revenge against her mother was a bonus. On revealing her supposed intentions, it is not taken up well by Anant at first, which leads Rehaan to leave the house. Later being asked for answers, Ahana reveals the initial reason behind the marriage before Anant, which shatters him. Misunderstandings brew up. Soon after, Ahana gets pregnant. Elated, she tries to reveal this to Anant. In a series of misunderstandings and the growing distance between them, she is forced to decide to abort her unborn child. Laila is left broke by Mahendra, she has an accident. Rehaan realizes his mistakes. After knowing the abortion bit, Anant again hates Ahana. Rehaan asks for Ahana's forgiveness. She forgives him soon after and is taken care of by him. He supports her through the hard times and they go for a Goa trip. Rehaan and Ahana grow closer during the trip. Meanwhile, Anant realizes his mistake and wants to give a second chance to their marriage. Ahana returns home but misunderstandings still prevail in their relationship. Meanwhile, Anant gets to know about Ahana and Rehaan's relationship through Rehaan's ex-girlfriend Vyoma. The show ends with Anant about to confront Ahana and Rehaan about the same.

== Cast ==
- Sanjay Kapoor as Anant Mathur – Ahana's husband and her father's friend. He loves Ahana but misunderstandings ruin their relationship.
- Smriti Kalra as Ahana Anant Mathur (née Raichand) – Laila Raichand's younger daughter and Anant's second wife.
- Aashim Gulati as Rehaan Khanna – son of Anant's friend. He is Saloni's ex-boyfriend and loves Ahana.
- Niki Aneja Walia as Laila Raichand – Saloni and Ahana's mother. She is a greedy woman who cheats her husband and earlier wanted to marry Anant for money.
- Chestha Bhagat as Saloni Tarun Gupta (née Raichand) – Laila Raichand's older daughter and Tarun's wife. She loved Rehaan earlier.
- Puneet Sharma as Tarun Gupta – Saloni's husband.
- Indraneel Bhattacharya as Mr. Mahendra Gupta – Tarun's father and Laila Raichand's business rival.
- Beena Banerjee as Reema Mathur – Anant's older sister
- Anandita Pagnis as Roshni Mathur – Anant's daughter. She hates Ahana and creates trouble between Anant and Ahana.
- Krrish Wawa as Aarav Mathur – Anant's son.
- Bidisha Ghosh Sharma as Yamini – sister of Anant's first wife. She loves Anant secretly.
- Naveen Pandita as Karan – Driver at Anant's house. He was orphaned at the age of six so when Anant found him, he brought him home and raised him along with Roshni. He is in love with Roshni and would go to any length to keep her happy.
- Geet Sharma as Kavita – Servant at Anant's house and Hiralal and Uma's daughter. She loves Karan and is a greedy girl who hates Roshni.
- Swati Tarar as Nisrin - Most notorious Employee of the house.
- Aman Mondal as Farhaan Malik, Aarav's friend.
- Bobby Parvez as Rahul Raichand, Laila's husband, Ahana and Saloni's father

=== Guests ===
- Nakuul Mehta as Shivaay Singh Oberoi from Ishqbaaaz
- Surbhi Chandna as Anika Shivaay Singh Oberoi from Ishqbaaaz

== Production ==
=== Development ===
Initially titled as Ishq Gunaah, it was renamed Dil Sambhal Jaa Zara while in pre-production.

The series was filmed at sets created in a studio at Kanhurmarg in Mumbai.

Initially Samir Soni was cast as the lead Anant Mathur and had also shot for the pilot episode but was soon replaced by Sanjay Kapoor as the makers felt the former not suitable for it.

In November 2017, lead Smiriti Kalra did not shoot for a week after she suffered back injuries by tripping from the staircase while shooting.

On 3 January 2018, a strike in Mumbai by Dalit group affected the filming of the series due to which the shooting was wrapped up too early in morning itself.

=== Cancellation ===
The very less ratings of the series make the channel to axe it abruptly within about four months of premiere. Initially airing at 10:30 pm (IST) slot, with a low viewership, it was shifted to 11:00 pm slot on 15 January 2018, with time given until 2 February 2018 to end the series.

== Soundtrack ==
Harish Sagane had composed the original songs and background score for the show. The lyrics were penned by Faraz Ansari and Shakeel Azmi. The tracks become an instant hit among viewers.

Track list
| No. | Title | Lyrics | Vocalist | Length |
|---|---|---|---|---|
| 1. | "Jeene Bhi De" | Faraz Ansari & Shakeel Azmi | Yasser Desai | 6:24 |
| 2. | "Ae Dil Na Kar Tu Chahate" | Shakeel Azmi | Soham Naik & Armaan Malik | 3:33 |
| 3. | "Phir Mohabbat" | Mithoon | Mohd. Irfan, Arijit, Saim Bhatt | 5:49 |
