= Phir Bhi Na Maane...Badtameez Dil =

Indian musical television series

- Written by: Saurabh Tewari; Pranjal Saxena; Nishikant Ray; Gautam Hegde; Janki V Raghubir Shekhavat
- Creative directors: Tanu Tiwary; Ketaki Walawalkar
- Starring: Pearl V Puri; Suyyash Rai; Asmita Sood
- Country of origin: India
- Original language: Hindi
- No. of seasons: 1
- No. of episodes: 122

Production
- Producers: Saurabh Tewari; Sumeet Chaudhary; Sudhanshu Tewari; Deepak Gurnani
- Production location: Mumbai
- Editor: Sudhir
- Running time: Approx. 23 minutes
- Production company: Saurabh Tewari Films

Original release
- Network: Star Plus (29 June 2015 – 26 September 2015); Hotstar (28 September 2015 – 18 November 2015)
- Release: 29 June – 18 November 2015

Phir Bhi Na Maane...Badtameez Dil (transl. Still Not Agreeing... The Insolent Heart) is an Indian musical romantic series which originally premiered on 29 June 2015 on Star Plus as a television program and ran through to 26 September 2015 before it moved to digital platform Hotstar from 28 September 2015 till 18 November 2015. The series stars Pearl V Puri and Asmita Sood.

== Plot ==
The story revolves around Abeer Malhotra, a successful and charming rockstar, and Meher Purohit. During college, Abeer sets his eye on a simple, intellectual and pretty girl, Meher, and they subsequently get married at a young age and then get divorced. Eight years later, Meher returns in his life as the new CEO of the music channel he sings for. Abeer decides to tell their love story in the first season in retaliation when Meher changes the time slot of his show from 9pm to 11pm.

Their bitter hatred begins to dissolve as Abeer has to stay in Meher's house to hide from some goons. However, when Meher meets with an accident Abeer gets paranoid and stays by to nurse her for 2 weeks while she is unconscious. Meanwhile, there is a flashback to the past where it is revealed how they separated.

Meher was a working woman who wanted to support her aunt and mother financially. Abeer's ego was hurt since he felt he wasn't given importance just because he wasn't earning at the time. Side by side, Abeer's aunt and father added fuel to the fire because Meher's aunt was the eye witness for a crime that Abeer's uncle committed. He was jailed so they wanted to ruin Meher and Abeer's relationship for revenge.

The sequence returns to present and Meher is healed by Abeer's love. He proposes to her once again but she rejects the proposal and it is revealed to Abeer that Meher did not take the alimony from Abeer. So Abeer decides to leave his father's house.

Abeer sings for Meher and proposes to her once again in the office but she rejects him and tells Sahani that she is resigning from the job. While Abeer is trying to win Meher's love once again, Akshat, a new man in Meher's life is introduced. He stood by her for the 8 years when she was shattered and wants to marry her. Abeer tries to prove himself better than Akshat with the help of his friend Appendix and his fan Aliya.

Abeer challenges Meher that he will prove that Akshat is not a good man to marry. He sees Akshat with a child and tells Meher about it. Akshat proposes to Meher. Meher says she already knows that child, Ishaan, and lies that he is Akshat's son.

However it is revealed that Ishaan is Meher and Abeer's son. Meher gets engaged to Akshat. On the engagement day, it is revealed that Abeer and Ishaan both are allergic to kiwi, but in anger, they drink the kiwi fruit punch.

Abeer takes Ishaan to the hospital and gets admitted in the same room. Abeer's mother, Madhavi, notices similarities between Abeer and Ishaan and Meher is compelled to tell her the truth. Abeer is about to marry Sasha, but on getting to know the truth calls off the wedding.

In the last few episodes, Abeer and Akshat keep trying to impress Ishaan and woo Meher. Abeer also starts noticing similarities between Ishaan and him. He tries to make Ishaan more like him by teaching him to play guitar, making friends with girls etc.

One day, Ishaan is bullied by one of his schoolmates. Ishaan calls Akshat and tells him about it, but instead of supporting him, Akshat starts shouting at him and later tells him to complain about it to their teacher.

Ishaan is scared as the bully said that if he tells the teacher about it, he'll beat him up even more. Abeer encourages him and gives him confidence. This makes their friendship stronger. Abeer and Ishaan become good friends, making Akshat insecure. Akshat and Abeer start fighting for Ishaan. Ishaan then gives them a task where they each have to pull each of his hand. The one who lets go of the hand first will lose and whoever would be the winner loved him more.

Abeer notices that Ishaan's hand is hurting during the challenge so he lets go of his hand. Ishaan reveals that this was a trick to show Meher who loves him more. He asks her why Abeer loves him more as earlier he used to fight with him a lot. One day Akshat breaks Ishaan's guitar, gifted by Abeer, in anger. Upset, he goes to Abeer's home for sometime where he gets to know that Abeer is divorced.

Ishaan finds Abeer's wedding album in his wardrobe as he wants to find out why Abeer loves him more. He is shocked to know that Abeer and Meher were married and that Abeer is his father. Kuber reveals to Rati the whole truth behind Nisaar's sudden disappearance and repents his mistakes. Rati forgives him. Ishaan on learning the whole truth requests Meher to forgive Abeer.

Enraged, Akshat fights with Abeer and ultimately conveys to Meher that she still loves Abeer and leaves. Devki is also convinced by Suman and Ishaan. Suman and Devki approve Abeer and Meher's alliance. Meher agrees and the show ends on a happy note.

== Cast ==
- Pearl V Puri as Abeer Malhotra: Meher's husband, Kuber and Madhavi's son and Ishaan's father.
- Asmita Sood as Meher Abeer Malhotra(née Purohit): Abeer's wife, Suman and Shyam's daughter, Devki's niece, Tarun's elder sister and Ishaan's mother.
- Suyyash Rai as Nissar Malik: Abeer and Meher's friend
- Payal Nair as Devki Purohit: Meher's Aunt
- Charusheela Vachhani as Abeer's Taiji
- Ayub Khan as Kuber Malhotra: Abeer's father and Ishaan's grandfather
- Anjali Mukhi as Mrs. Madhavi Kuber Malhotra: Abeer's mother and Ishaan's grandmother
- Nivedita Saraf as Suman Purohit: Meher's mother and Ishaan's grandmother
- Roshni Sahota as Rati
- Vindhya Tiwari as Sasha : Meher, Nissar and Abeer's friend
- Krish Chauhan as Ishaan Malhotra: Meher and Abeer's son
- Shivamm Sengar as Tarun Purohit (Tunnu) : Meher's Brother
- Abhishek Sharma as Kenny
- Amit Dhawan
- Indresh Malik as Satish Sahni (Sattu sir): Meher and Abeer's boss
- Ashlesha Sawant as Nishi Satish Sahni
- Rahul Kumar as Tillu
- Parul Chaudhary as Lovelyn
- Santoshh Kumar as Madhusudhan
- Dibyendu Bhattacharya as Pinky Bhai: a don in season 2
- Arjun Singh as Akshat: Meher's best friend

== Soundtrack ==
| No. | Title | Singer(s) | Length |
|---|---|---|---|
| 1. | "Mere Nishaan" | Darshan Raval | 4:10 |
| 2. | "Naram Naram" | Darshan Raval | 2:27 |
| 3. | "Awargi" | Darshan Raval | 3:56 |
| 4. | "Tere Nishaan (Mere Nishaan Sad/Background Music)" | Darshan Raval | 1:15 |
| 5. | "Yaadein Teri (Jeene Ki Duaa)" | Suyyash Rai | 2:55 |
| 6. | "Mere Nishaan (Rock Version)" | Darshan Raval | 3:06 |
| 7. | "Mere Nishaan (Romantic Version)" | Darshan Raval | 3:06 |
| 8. | "Neend Udi Thi" | Darshan Raval | 4:10 |

== Awards ==
| Year | Award | Category | Nominee | Result |
|---|---|---|---|---|
| 2016 | Indian Telly Awards | Best Fresh New Face (Male) | Pearl V Puri | Nominated |
