= Superstar Kidnap =

- Theatrical release poster
- Directed by: Sushanth Reddy
- Written by: Sushanth Reddy
- Produced by: A.Sathi Reddy
- Starring: Nandu; Aadarsh Balakrishna; Bhupal; Poonam Kaur
- Cinematography: Eshwar Yellumahanthi
- Music by: Sai Karthik
- Production company: Lucky Creations
- Release date: 3 July 2015
- Running time: 120 minutes
- Country: India
- Language: Telugu

Superstar Kidnap is a 2015 Indian Telugu-language comedy film directed by Sushanth Reddy. The film stars Nandu, Aadarsh Balakrishna, Bhupal and Poonam Kaur. The film is about three friends who devise a plan to kidnap successful actor Mahesh Babu.

== Cast ==
- Nandu as Nandu
- Aadarsh Balakrishna as Jai
- Bhupal as Bhupal
- Poonam Kaur as Priya
- Thagubothu Ramesh
- Vennela Kishore as Vennela Kishore
- Posani Krishna Murali
- Fish Venkat

Cameo appearances

- Nani as himself
- Allari Naresh as himself
- Shraddha Das as a goon
- Manchu Manoj as himself
- Tanish as Michael
- Tejaswi Madivada

== Soundtrack ==
The songs are composed by Sai Karthik. In a review of the songs, a critic stated that "All in all, Superstar Kidnap looks like an experimental album with good sound production values and mix of various genres. However, Sai Karthik could have struck a better balance between mass tracks and duets".

- "Superstar Kidnap" - Ranjith
- "Oh Na Manasa" - Naresh Iyer (lyrics by Kittu Vissapragada)
- "Aase Paddadu" - Gana Bala
- "Ola Ola" - Ranjith

== Release ==
The Hindu wrote that "It is not a great movie, but go without expectations and you might not entirely regret watching the film".
