= Bandhu Balaga =

- Poster
- Directed by: Naganna
- Written by: Janardhana Maharshi
- Produced by: D. Kamalakar; M. B. Babu
- Starring: Shiva Rajkumar; Poonam Kaur; Shashi Kumar; Hema Chaudhary
- Cinematography: Ramesh Babu
- Edited by: Shyam
- Music by: Hamsalekha
- Production company: Sri Lakshmi Ganapati Productions
- Release date: 26 June 2008
- Running time: 148 minutes
- Country: India
- Language: Kannada

Bandhu Balaga is a 2008 Indian Kannada-language drama film directed by Naganna and written by Janardhana Maharshi. The film stars Shiva Rajkumar and Poonam Kaur, Hema Chaudhary along with Tejaswini Prakash, Shashi Kumar and Harish Raj in other pivotal roles. Parul Yadav, who played the role of sister in law of the hero, made her Kannada debut through this movie.

The film featured an original score and soundtrack composed and written by Hamsalekha.

== Plot ==
The story surrounds the main character, Subramanya, an illegitimate son of a rich man. He lives with his sister in his village and spends most of his time doing good deeds for people who need help. However, he ends up in trouble when his father steps in to make matters confusing.

== Cast ==
- Shiva Rajkumar as Subramanya
- Poonam Kaur as Lakshmi
- Tejaswini Prakash as Annapoorna
- Jyothirmayi as Nisha (Special appearance)
- Harish Raj as K. Raghunandan
- Shashi Kumar as eldest brother
- Dharma as Keshava
- Suryodaya as Ganapa
- Doddanna as Devanna
- Parul Yadav as Chamundeshwari
- Srinivasa Murthy as Anantharamaiah
- Hema Choudhary as Anantharamaiah's wife
- Sathyajith as Mada, tailor in village
- M. N. Lakshmi Devi as Mada's mother and midwife
- Honnavalli Krishna as Kittappa
- Mandeep Roy as villager
- Vijayasarathi as Raghunandan's father
- Pushpa Swamy as Raghunandan's mother
- Kuri Prathap as villager
- Brahmananda Guruji as priest (uncredited)
- Rakesh (credited as Master Rakesh)
- Chiranjeevi (credited as Master Chiranjeevi)

== Soundtrack ==
The music was composed by Hamsalekha to his own lyrics.

All lyrics are written by Hamsalekha.

Track listing
No.	Title	Singer(s)	Length
1.	"Amma Ee Jeeva"	S. P. Balasubrahmanyam
2.	"Ninna Bittu Naanu"	Kunal Ganjawala
3.	"Koogalu Kareyalu"	Madhu Balakrishnan, Nanditha
4.	"Kasu Beda Kavade Beda"	S. P. Balasubrahmanyam
5.	"Avatthu Nanna"	Anuradha Bhat, Hemanth Kumar, Nandini Hamsalekha
6.	"Maduve Endare Sambhrama"	Madhu Balakrishnan, Nanditha

== Reception ==
A critic from Rediff.com wrote that "All in all, Bandhu Balaga is an enjoyable fare for the entire family". Sify wrote "The strong dose of 'desi' strength is focused besides the need of family unity wherein lot of strength could be found in the main stress of 'Bandhu Balaga'. Janardhan Maharshi’s story is outdated but the screenplay matches the present day. There is a very good performance, two lovely tunes from Hamsalekha and cinematography boost up the image of the film".
