= Nenjirukkum Varai (2006 film) =

- Poster
- Directed by: S. A. Chandrasekaran
- Screenplay by: S. A. Chandrasekaran
- Story by: Shoba
- Produced by: Gordhan Tanwani
- Starring: Narain; Poonam Kaur
- Cinematography: M. Jeevan
- Edited by: J. N. Harsha
- Music by: Srikanth Deva
- Production company: Baba Films
- Release date: 15 December 2006
- Country: India
- Language: Tamil

Nenjirukkum Varai (transl. As long as there is a heart) is a 2006 Indian Tamil-language romantic drama film directed by S. A. Chandrasekaran from a story by his wife Shoba. The film stars Narain and newcomer Deepa, while Mahadevan, Thalaivasal Vijay, Kalairani, Nassar, and Livingston play supporting roles. The music was composed by Srikanth Deva with cinematography by M. Jeevan and editing by J. N. Harsha. Nenjirukkum Varai released on 15 December 2006.

== Plot ==
Ganesan is a slum boy who drives an auto to support his family. Bhuvana is the neglected daughter of a rich man Rangasamy and is in search of true love. Bhuvana is drawn to Ganesh's honesty and good heart. She confesses her love to Ganesh, but he turns her away, saying that a rich girl like her would never be able to live in poverty with him. Bhuvana tells Ganesh she will show him she can do it and comes to his house with just the clothes on herself. As Bhuvana and Ganesh share a happy love and understanding, life is all roses until a storm disrupts their happiness. Bhuvana meets with an accident and fights for her life. The doctors say that nothing but a heart transplant could save her. Ganesh has no money for the operation and is unable to bear the thought of a life without Bhuvana.

Ganesh collects about two lakhs out of three, which is not accepted at the hospital counter. He approaches KRS, the hospital MD, at his VIP party and causes a ruckus. He gets arrested and is detained in a room. He becomes frustrated, holds the emergency room hostage, and threatens to blow up the 40 people inside. The hostages include the cardiologist who refused to operate on his lover, a minister hiding from journalists, a child suffering from blood leukaemia, an old couple, and a young couple. An accident emergency case occurs, and Ganesh opens the ER for treatment. The hostages began to doubt his threats. Police rescue fails, and they end up conceding to his demand and operating on Bhuvana. The hostages grow sympathetic to Ganesh's cause and help him and pray for him.

Ayyanar, the DCP, tries to get even for getting slapped by Ganesh during one of the hostage talks. Ayyanar pretends to be an injured victim and enters the room. The hostages refuse to move out of the room even as Ganesh gets apprehended by Ayyanar. Though the hospital had agreed to operate on Bhuvana, no hospital seems to have a matching heart to perform a heart transplant. This is when Ganesh is determined to give her his own heart. He cuts his hand to send for a blood group, and it matches Bhuvana’s blood group. The doctor refuses to accept a living person's heart, stating that it is illegal. Ganesh decides to kill himself and sacrifice his life for hers. All the hostages persuade him to find some other way. Ganesh talks to Bhuvana one last time and then commits suicide, thereby giving his heart to Bhuvana (indicating his love towards her).

== Cast ==
- Narain as Ganesan
- Deepa as Bhuvana
- Mahadevan as Rangasamy Naidu, Bhuvana's father
- Thalaivasal Vijay as Ganesh's father
- Nassar as Doctor
- Kalairani as Ganesh's mother
- Livingston as Gandhi
- Ganja Karuppu as Auto Driver
- Sriman as K. R. Subramaniam (KRS), hospital MD
- Subbaraju as DCP Ayyanar
- Sanjeev as Sanjeev
- Charle as Singamuthu
- Nellai Siva as Ekambaram
- Karate Raja as Police
- Master Mahendran as Murugan, Ganesan's brother
- Aarthi
- Kovai Senthil
- Rekha Vedavyas (Special appearance)
- Seema (Special appearance)
- Siva Narayana Murthy (Special appearance in the song "Azhagana Ponnuthan")

== Soundtrack ==
Soundtrack was composed by Srikanth Deva. The audio was released on 26 November 2006. The song "Azhagana Ponnuthan" borrows its opening line from the song of the same name from Alibabavum 40 Thirudargalum (1956). Saraswathy Srinivas of Rediff.com wrote that "If you can forget the remix of old hits, this is not a bad album".

Song	Singers	Lyrics
"Azhagana Ponnuthan"	Shoba Chandrasekhar, Gopal Sharma	Pa. Vijay
"Kadhaliye"	Haricharan	Na. Muthukumar
"Kichu Kichu Moottadhada"	Saindhavi, Udit Narayan	Pa. Vijay
"Mambazham Vikkara"	Puliyanthoppu Pazhani, Tippu, Devakumar	Puliyanthoppu Pazhani
"Oru Murai Piranthen"	Hariharan, Sadhana Sargam	Thamarai
"Pudichirukku"	Bombay Jayashri, Vijay Yesudas	Na. Muthukumar
"Yedho Onnu"	Priyadarshini, Senthildass Velayutham	S. A. Chandrasekhar

== Release ==
Shortly before release, Nenjirukkum Varai was blocked by the Madras High Court after a petition filed by Aby Kunjumon, alleging the climax plagiarised his script Swaasam, which he registered with the South India Story Writers Association in 2000. However, the court soon allowed the film's release, provided the producer "furnish a bank guarantee" of ₹25,000 (equivalent to ₹88,000 or US$910 in 2026).

== Critical reception ==
Cinesouth appreciated the story, direction and cinematography, but criticised the climax for its long-windedness. Malini Mannath of Chennai Online wrote, "Director SAC shifts from his usual style here, but the film could have done with more originality and a more convincing script". Sify wrote, "Veteran director S.A.Chandrasekhar has his heart in the right place, but his technique and presentation isn’t".
