= Ek Haseena Thi Ek Deewana Tha =

2017 Indian Hindi-language romantic musical drama film

- Official poster
- Directed by: Suneel Darshan
- Written by: Suneel Darshan
- Screenplay by: Suneel Darshan; Akash Deep; Kushal Bakshi (dialogues); Uddeept Gaur (dialogues); Vikash Tiwari (dialogues)
- Story by: Suneel Darshan
- Produced by: Suneel Darshan
- Starring: Shiv Darshan; Natasha Fernandez; Upen Patel; Soni Kaur
- Cinematography: Amarjeet Singh
- Edited by: Archit Rastogi
- Music by: Nadeem Saifi
- Production company: Shree Krishna International
- Release date: 30 June 2017
- Country: India
- Language: Hindi

Ek Haseena Thi Ek Deewana Tha (transl. There was a beauty, there was a crazy lover) is a 2017 Indian Hindi-language romantic musical drama film written, produced and directed by Suneel Darshan starring Shiv Darshan, Natasha Fernandez and Upen Patel in lead roles. The music was composed by Nadeem Saifi.

== Plot ==
Young and naive Natasha starts a chain of events when she creates a dilemma for herself. She sets off for her destination wedding with her fiancé, Sunny, to her ancestral property, Mt. Unique Estate, only to fall helplessly in love with its stud farmkeeper, Devdhar. Consumed by his robust yet poetic, aggressive yet persistent advances, she realises that his arms were the ultimate destination of her dreams. But who really is Devdhar? A conman hired to destroy her bliss, a supernatural being, or just a figment of her imagination? Torn between her lover and the one she dares to love, Natasha learns that love is the deadliest deception when she is engulfed in a vortex of devastating upheavals that leaves all those touched by its intensity heartbroken and in a state of bewilderment.

== Cast ==
- Shiv Darshan as Devdhar
- Natasha Fernandez as Natasha
- Upen Patel as Sunny
- San Mahajan as villain
- Soni Kaur as Rita
- Dimppy Ramdayal
- Krishan Tandon
- Lalitmohan Tiwari
- Rumi Khan
- Grant Crookes

== Production ==
The film was shot in the United Kingdom, across several sites including Cornwall, Dartmouth, Cardiff and Manchester.

== Soundtrack ==
Ek Haseena Thi Ek Deewana Tha

Soundtrack album by Nadeem Saifi
- Released: 3 June 2017
- Genre: Feature film soundtrack
- Length: 28:50
- Language: Hindi
- Label: Shree Krishna International

The film's music and lyrics were composed and penned by Nadeem (of Nadeem-Shravan fame). The soundtrack was released on 13 July 2017 by Shree Krishna International, and consists of six songs. The full album is recorded by Palak Muchhal & Yasser Desai. Songs have got more than 1.2 Billion views.

Track listing
No.	Title	Lyrics	Music	Singer(s)	Length
1.	"Ek Haseena Thi Ek Deewana Tha"	Nadeem Saifi	Nadeem Saifi	Yasser Desai
2.	"Hue Bechain"	Nadeem Saifi	Nadeem Saifi	Palak Muchhal, Yasser Desai
3.	"Hanste Hanste"	Nadeem Saifi	Nadeem Saifi	Palak Muchhal, Yasser Desai
4.	"Nain"	Faaiz Anwar	Nadeem Saifi	Palak Muchhal, Yasser Desai
5.	"Aankhon Mein Aansoon"	Nadeem Saifi	Nadeem Saifi	Palak Muchhal, Yasser Desai
6.	"Tum Kahaan The"	Nadeem Saifi	Nadeem Saifi	Palak Muchhal, Yasser Desai
Total length:					28:50
