= Kaisa Yeh Ishq Hai... Ajab Sa Risk Hai =

Indian television series

- Genre: Drama; Comedy
- Written by: Zama Habib
- Directed by: Ravi Raj
- Starring: Sukirti Kandpal; Gaurav S Bajaj
- Country of origin: India
- Original language: Hindi
- No. of seasons: 1
- No. of episodes: 252

Production
- Producer: Manish Goswami
- Running time: 30 minutes
- Production company: Siddhanth Cinevision

Original release
- Network: Life OK
- Release: 22 April 2013 – 23 May 2014

Kaisa Yeh Ishq Hai... Ajab Sa Risk Hai (transl. How Is This Love) is an Indian Hindi-language soap opera and sitcom, a love story of two individuals with different backgrounds coming together, which aired on Life OK from 22 April 2013 to 23 May 2014. The show was produced by Manish Goswami and was originally titled Chali Main Piya Ke Desh. Initial part of show was shot at Macau, Singapore and Bangkok.

== Plot ==
The show is a love story serial of a modern Singaporean girl, Simran, and a typical Haryanvi boy, Rajveer, and her escapade to settle in and win over the patriarchal Haryanvi family, whose beliefs and values differ from hers. In the first couple of episodes, each family is depicted.

When Simran hears that Shyamsundar seeks a bride, she changes her looks to impress Rajveer's family. Her father also changes his looks. She learns the Haryanvi language, the household chores and cooking. When Rajveer's family comes to see her, they are impressed by her. Rajveer's father, who knows who Simran really is, assists her in marrying to Rajveer. Even Jaggi learns about this. When their marriage is coming Rajveer has a weird feeling about his fiancée, but still marries her. When Rajveer sees her face he is shocked and angry. He wants her to leave the house.

When it is time to leave the house, Simran breaks down into tears. Lohari wants to take revenge on her family for killing her husband. She succeeds in killing her father who tells her that her son is alive (she was told that she gave birth to a dead child) and he was in their house. When Simran came to know that Lohari killed her father, she threatens her to tell everyone about her misdeed. But before that happens Simran is pushed down a cliff by Lohari, and it ends with everyone believing that Simran is dead.

Three months pass and Rajveer is depressed because he blames himself for Simran's death, but also perceives that she is near, but is unable to see her. Simran is seen by Lohari in the form of a Ghost. Lohari hits Rajveer with an axe so he loses his memory.

Lohari discovers that Rajveer is her son and feels guilty about her injuring her own son. The family gets to know that Simran is alive as Lohari gets to know that Simran was only pretending to be a ghost in front of her. The family eventually take her home. After that, Lohari wants Simran to stay away from Rajveer. One day, she left home and took away Rajveer from home. Other side Rano (Rajveer's sister) falls in love with Gabroo who met her when Simran and Rano go out for searching Rajveer. They get married after some trouble in the family.

Simran and Rajveer moved on to the abandoned school where Simran taught Wajiro. Simran found out that she was pregnant. When the family got to know about that they wanted Simran and Rajveer to return except for Shyamsundar. Everyone convinced her, but he said only if no one talked to them which everyone agreed. Rajjo could not accept this and she went mad on Lohari as she didn't fulfill any of her promises, so she decided to reveal her truth in front of the whole family. But nobody believed her, and they asked her to leave the house which she finally agreed to do.

After 13 days following Lohari's death, things returned to normal, but a strange thing happened in the house. Rampyari acted very differently as Lali did her mind negative against everyone as she wanted to destroy the whole family. But Simran tried to calm her down which succeeded.

After 15 years, things changed in the village as Shyamsundar realized that educated women was not bad, but instead good, he allowed all the girls in the village to go to the school. The family was very happy with Simran and Rajveer, and their two daughters also went to school. When Simran taught her students, Shyamsundar came there and asked her if she also could become her teacher and teach him, which Simran agreed to do so. It ended with Shyamsundar hugging both Simran and Rajveer and saying that she was the best daughter-in-law anyone could ever have.

== Cast ==
- Sukirti Kandpal as Simran Khanna Sangwan
- Gaurav S Bajaj as Rajveer Singh Sangwan
- Sunil Singh as Shyamsundar Singh Sangwan a.k.a. Tau
- Sudha Chandran as Lohari (22 January 2014 – 8 May 2014)
- Sagar Saini as Hoshiyar Singh Sangwan
- Suyyash Rai as Himmat Singh Sangwan
- Sonal Parihar as Lali Himmat Singh Sangwan
- Rajesh Balwani as Mr. Khanna
- Nancy Johal as Dimpy
- Mushtaq Khan as Jeevan Lal
- Lovey Sasan as Rano
- Abhishek Avasthi as Gabroo
- Mona Ambegaonkar as Lohari (April 2013 – December 2013)
- Arun Bali as Daddu
- Tia Dutta as Kaushalya Mitra
- Adaa Khan as Amrit
