= Mayajalam =

- Directed by: S. V. Krishna Reddy
- Written by: Janardhana Maharshi (story); S. V. Krishna Reddy (screenplay); Marudhuri Raja (dialogues)
- Produced by: R. R. Venkat; K. Atchi Reddy (presenter)
- Starring: Srikanth; Deepa
- Cinematography: Vijay C. Kumar
- Edited by: K. V. Krishna Reddy
- Music by: S. V. Krishna Reddy
- Release date: 12 May 2006; (India)
- Country: India
- Language: Telugu

Mayajalam is a 2006 Indian Telugu film directed by S. V. Krishna Reddy and starring Srikanth and Poonam Kaur (Deepa).

== Plot ==
MP Pradeep decides to get his eccentric son Chatrapathi married as quickly as possible and heads to famed marriage broker and planner Vamsi, who is known for managing all parts of weddings with his team through bumper offers. When a big doctor and owner of a super specialty hospital comes in looking for a match for his daughter Swathi, Vamsi gives them Chatrapathi's details. However, Swathi receives Vamsi's photo by mistake and, already smitten by him from a previous chance meeting, falls in love and agrees to the marriage. It turns out both fathers have dark secrets; Pradeep is engaged in various corrupt and criminal activities and has killed two witnesses to cover up his crimes, while the doctor possesses fake degrees and tricks people into getting an operation so that he can kill them and steal their organs to sell illegally. When Vamsi's brother, an honest police officer, investigates the MP, he is beaten and locked in a room with a broken telephone being his only hope to contact the outside world.

The two witnesses' souls become ghosts and find the ghosts of two of the doctor's victims in his farmhouse. When the wedding is decided to be held there, the ghosts use their powers to possess people to take revenge, disrupting the proceedings and ultimately leading to Swathi disclosing her love of Vamsi. Vamsi tries to rectify the situation, but his brother finally gets a call through to him and discloses what Pradeep did, so he fights Pradeep to get him to disclose where his brother is. While he rescues his brother, both fathers conspire to get their kids married while he's gone; the ghosts intervene and make them confess their crimes while the wedding videographer films them, ultimately sending them to prison for life. The film ends with Vamsi and Swathi happily married.

== Cast ==
- Srikanth as Vamsi
- Deepa (Debut) as Swati Rajender
- Pradeep Rawat as MP Pradeep
- Brahmanandam as Ghost
- Ali as Ghost
- Venu Madhav as Ghost
- Krishna Bhagavan as Ghost
- Sayaji Shinde as Rajender (Doctor)
- Shafi as Chhatrapati
- Ravi Prakash as Prakash IPS (CI) Vamsi's brother
- Nakuul Mehta
- Gundu Hanumantha Rao
- Mallikarjuna Rao
- Ashok Kumar
- Sivaji Raja
- Duvvasi Mohan
- Babu Mohan
- Tanikella Bharani as Doctor's friend
- Geetha
- Hema
- Uttej
- J. V. Ramana Murthy
- Giri Babu
- L.B. Sriram
- Tirupathi Prakash
- Ganesh
- Apoorva
- Gundu Sudarshan
- Kishore Raati
- Jyothi

== Soundtrack ==
Music by S. V. Krishna Reddy.

- "Ringingakka" - S P Eshwar, Tina Kamal
- "Abbai" - Kushi Muralidhar, Sumangali
- " If You Want" - Ganga, Sagar
- "Hot Summer" - Devi Sri Prasad
- "Teeyaga" - Kaundinya, Sankrithi

== Reception ==
A critic from Indiaglitz called the film a "mixed fare".
