= Khwaish =

- Created by: Nivedita Basu
- Directed by: Mujammil Desai; Swapnil Mahaling
- Starring: See Below
- Opening theme: "Khwaish" by Rekha Rao
- Country of origin: India
- Original language: Hindi
- No. of episodes: 163

Production
- Producers: Ekta Kapoor; Shobha Kapoor
- Editors: Vikas Sharma; Khursheed Rizvi; Prem Raaj
- Running time: 24 minutes
- Production company: Balaji Telefilms

Original release
- Network: Sony Entertainment Television
- Release: 16 July 2007 – 24 April 2008

Khwaish is an Indian television series which was telecast on Sony Entertainment Television from 16 July 2007 to 24 April 2008.

The show aired in Pakistan on ARY Digital from 25 June 2007, becoming the first Indian television show legally broadcast on Pakistan.

The series was produced in Dubai.

== Plot ==
The show is based on the life of an Indian Muslim girl, Afreen, who is living with her family in Dubai. Afreen gets what many girls dream of: marriage into a wealthy and respectable family, as well as a handsome, loving husband, Kabir. Soon, she is expecting her first child. Kabir's brother in law, Azaan, is in love with the wealthy and spoiled Sania, who lives in London. Azaan shares his love story with his beloved brother Kabir.

Unfortunately, Afreen's joy is short-lived, as Kabir suddenly dies in an accident. Circumstances then lead Afreen to marry her brother-in-law Azaan, who has never gotten along with her. One misunderstanding after another affects the relationships within the family. However, as time passes, Azaan and Afreen begin to take a liking to each other, until they fall in love. Then, Sania lands in Dubai and tries to separate Azaan and Afreen. However, they always get back together. Sania threatens Afreen for ruining her life, and thus, for the sake of Sania, Afreen decides to leave Azaan. However, as Afreen still loves Azaan, she decides to wait until Azaan find out the true, spoiled nature of Sania. Once that happened, Afreen and Azaan got back together. Time passes, and they live happily. Afreen delivers a baby boy, Kabir. However, due to the child, Azaan and Afreen's relationship fall apart, and Azaan insists on a divorce. However, Afreen decides that she will not accept the divorce until she learns who is behind Kabir's death. Through investigation, the family realises that Zarin was responsible for the family's mishaps. Azaan and Afreen start their new life with much love and care with their baby Kabir, and they live happily thereafter.

One day, they see a man who almost perfectly resembles Kabir. Is this his look-alike or had he survived the accident? Was the accident staged by someone close to them? And who should now be considered Afreen's husband? The answers to these questions form the denouement of the story.

== Cast ==
- Sumeet Sachdev as Kabir Khan / Kamran
- Yasir Shah as Azaan Khan
- Priya Bathija as Afreen Kabir Khan / Afreen Azaan Khan
- Anju Mahendru as Zareen Shahnawaz Khan
- Nandish Sandhu as Yasir Hassan
- Indraneel Bhattacharya as Shahnawaz Khan
- Ragesh Asthanaa as Hadi Hassan
- Behzaad Khan as Mazhar Khan
- Ekta Sharma as Naaz
- Aaradhana Uppal as Nadira Phuppi (Kabir and Azaan's aunt)
- Avinash Sachdev as Salman
- Mitika Sharma as Nasreen Hassan (Afreen's sister)
- Anjali Mukhi as Naila Hussain
- Aniruddh Singh as Riaz Zardari
