= Cash (2021 film) =

2021 film directed by Rishab Seth

- Official release Poster
- Directed by: Rishab Seth
- Written by: Vishesh Bhatt; Rishab Seth; Aarsh Vora
- Produced by: Vishesh Bhatt
- Starring: Amol Parashar; Kavin Dave; Smriti Kalra; Gulshan Grover; Swanand Kirkire
- Cinematography: Nagaraj Rathinam
- Edited by: Sherwin Bernard; Devendra Murdeshwar
- Music by: Denny; Akulli; Gourov-Roshin; Vayu Shrivastav
- Production company: VA VA Voom
- Distributed by: Disney+Hotstar
- Release date: 19 November 2021
- Running time: 118 minutes
- Country: India
- Language: Hindi

Cash is a 2021 Indian Hindi-language comedy-drama film directed by Rishab Seth and produced by Vishesh Bhatt.

== Plot ==
The government announces demonetization to curb the rotation of black money in the nation. Seizing this as an opportunity, 25-year-old Armaan, a down-on-his-luck middle-class boy takes on the near-impossible task of laundering five crores of black money in less than 52 days before the banks stop accepting old notes.

== Cast ==
The main cast of the film are :-

- Amol Parashar as Armaan Gulati
- Smriti Kalra as Neha
- Kavin Dave as Vivek Sodani
- Gulshan Grover as Gautam Acharya
- Swanand Kirkire as Sanjay Gulati
- Anand Alkunte as Tukaram Pingle
- Pawan Chopra as Vijay Gulati

== Critical reception and reviews ==
Indo-Asian News Service rated the film 3.5 out of 5, Ronak Kotecha of The Times of India rated 3 out of 5 ratings and Ranpreet Kaur of Pinkvilla, rated the film 2 out of 5.
