= Kavita Kané =

Indian writer (born 1966)

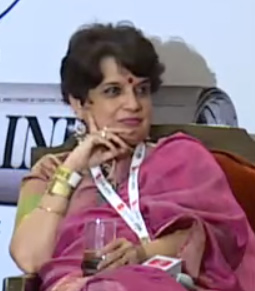
- Kavita Kané, Times Lit Fest, 2019
- Born: 5 August 1966 (age 60); Bombay (now Mumbai), Maharashtra, India
- Citizenship: Indian
- Education: Fergusson College, Savitribai Phule Pune University
- Occupations: Author, journalist, columnist, scriptwriter
- Writing career
- Genre: Mythology

Kavita Kané (born 5 August 1966) is an Indian writer and former journalist. She is known for writing Mythology-fiction. All of her books are based on Indian mythology. Her bestselling novel is Karna's wife: the Outcast Queen'.

== Early life and education ==
Born in Mumbai, Kavita Kané grew up in other cities like Patna, Delhi and Pune. She is an alumna of Fergusson College, Pune and has completed her post graduation, both in English Literature and Mass Communication, from the University of Pune. Although, initially, she wanted to be in the administrative services, she chose a career in journalism because she wanted to write and it was the only pragmatic career option for writing. She worked for 20 years in various media houses - Magna Publications, Daily News and Analysis and The Times of India. After the success of her debut novel, Karna's Wife, she opted to become a full time author.

== Personal life ==
She spent her childhood in Patna, Delhi, and Pune alongside her parents and two sisters. Raised in a household with a personal library of over 10,000 books, she and her siblings developed an early interest in reading. Her personal interests include cinema, theatre, and literature. Married to a mariner, Prakash Kane, she lives in Pune with two daughters, Kimaya and Amiya.

== Bibliography ==
- The Karna's Wife: The Outcast's Queen (2013)
- Sita's Sister (2014)
- Menaka's Choice (2015)
- Lanka's Princess (2016)
- The Fisher Queen’s Dynasty (2017)
- Ahalya's Awakening (2019)
- Saraswati's Gift (2021)
- Tara's Truce (2023)
- Bhima's Wife (2025)
