= Anjali Mukhi =

Indian television actress

Anjali
- Occupation: Actress
- Years active: 1998–present
- Known for: Saas Bina Sasural

Anjali Mukhi is an Indian television actress who is known for her roles of Sudha Lalit Kumar Sharma in Saas Bina Sasural and Sulochana Balraj Khurana in Yeh Hai Chahatein.

== Career ==
Anjali Mukhi made her television debut with Khwaish on Sony TV. She was last seen in I Luv My India as Simran on Life OK, as Sudha Lalit Sharma in Saas Bina Sasural on Sony TV and as Maithali in Chhanchhan on Sony TV. She played the role of Saroj Singh, Urmi's mother, in Doli Armaano Ki on Zee TV. She also played the role of Mrs Kamini Malhotra, Pushkar's mother, in Sony TV's Ek Duje Ke Vaaste. Later, she played the role of Nayantara in the StarPlus show Ishqbaaz. Between 2009 and 2010, she played the role of Leela Arvind Thakkar in the second season of the serial Baa Bahoo Aur Baby replacing Lubna Salim, but the show soon went off air. She played in Naati Pinky Ki Lambi Love Story as Mrs.Vankatraman. Currently, she is seen in Yeh Hai Chahatein as Sulochana Khurana, the main protagonist's mother-in-law.

== Filmography ==
=== Television ===
Year	Serial	Role	Ref.
2002	Cactus Flower	Mansi	
2004	Meher	Meher's sister-in-law	
2006	Kasamh Se	Mrs. Chopra	
2007–2008	Khwaish	Naila Hussain	
2009–2010	Baa Bahoo Aur Baby	Leela Thakkar	
2010–2012	Saas Bina Sasural	Sudha Sharma	
2012	I Luv My India	Simran	
2013	Hum Ne Li Hain... Shapath	Suhasini	
2013	Chhanchhan	Maithali Sarabhai	
2013–2015	Doli Armaano Ki	Saroj Singh	
2014–2015	Ek Rishta Aisa Bhi	Mrs. Roy	
2015	Phir Bhi Na Maane...Badtameez Dil	Madhavi Malhotra	
2016	Ek Duje Ke Vaaste	Kamini Malhotra	
2016	Tashan-e-Ishq	Anita Luthra	
2017	Ishqbaaaz	Nayantara	
2017–2019	Meri Hanikarak Biwi	Devina	
2020	Naati Pinky Ki Lambi Love Story	Mrs. Venkatraman	
2021	Yeh Hai Chahatein	Sulochana Khurana	
2022	Parineetii	Gurinder Bajwa	
2023	Katha Ankahee	Maya Singhania	
