= Gaurav S Bajaj =

Indian actor

- Occupation: Actor
- Years active: 2010–present
- Spouse: Sakshi Shhorwani (m. 2013)
- Children: 1

Gaurav S. Bajaj is an Indian television actor. He is best known for portraying Daksh Patwardhan in Sapnon Se Bhare Naina which was aired on Star Plus. He appeared in the popular drama series Uttaran as Aman Verma. He has also appeared in some other television series like Kaisa Yeh Ishq Hai... Ajab Sa Risk Hai, Piya Rangrezz, and Choti Sarrdaarni. Bajaj earned recognition for portraying Kartik Patel in Kyunki Rishton Ke Bhi Roop Badalte Hain.

== Personal life ==
Gaurav married Sakshi Shhorwani on December 10, 2013. Their first child was born in 2019.

== Filmography ==
=== Television ===
| Year | Title | Role | Channel | Ref. |
|---|---|---|---|---|
| 2010–2012 | Sapnon Se Bhare Naina | Daksh Patwardhan | Star Plus | |
| 2012 | Uttaran | Aman Verma | Colors TV | |
| 2013–2014 | Kaisa Yeh Ishq Hai... Ajab Sa Risk Hai | Rajveer Singh Sangwan | Life OK | |
| 2014 | Yeh Hai Aashiqui | Rishi | Bindass | |
| 2015 | Piya Rangrezz | Sher Singh | Life OK | |
| 2015–2016 | Piya Rangrezz | Shamsher Singh | Life OK | |
| 2017 | MTV Big F | Ishaan Bajaj | MTV India | |
| 2018 | Siddhi Vinayak | Rudra Kundra | &TV | |
| 2019–2020 | Meri Gudiya | Raghavendra Gujral | Star Bharat | |
| 2022 | Choti Sarrdaarni | Zorawar Singh Randhawa | Colors TV | |
| 2022–2023 | Janam Janam Ka Saath | Abir Tomar | Dangal | |
| 2023 | Swaraj | Shyamji Krishna Varma | DD National | |
| 2025 | Bade Achhe Lagte Hain 4 | Raman Bhalla | Sony Entertainment Television | |
| 2025 | Dhaakad Beera | Samrat Chaudhary | Colors TV | |
| 2026– | Kyunki Rishton Ke Bhi Roop Badalte Hain | Kartik Patel | Star Plus | |

=== Music video ===
| Year | Title | Singers | Record label | Ref. |
|---|---|---|---|---|
| 2021 | Hawa Karda | Afsana Khan and Sahil Sharma | Koinage Records | |

== Awards ==
| Year | Award(s) | Work | Result |
|---|---|---|---|
| 2012 | Indian Telly Award for Fresh New Face - Male | Sapnon Se Bhare Naina | Nominated |
