= Payal Nair =

Indian actress

- Born: Payal Nair; Delhi, India
- Occupation: Actress
- Years active: 2000–present
- Known for: Meher
- Spouse: Mahesh Nair

Payal Nair is an Indian actress who is popularly known for her title role in Meher. She made her film debut in Jungle (2000).

== Career ==
She is best known for her roles in films like Sorry Bhai! (2008) and for television appearances in series such as Do Saheliyaan... Kismat Ki Kathputaliyaan (2010), Saat Phere: Saloni Ka Safar (2005) and Chand Chupa Badal Mein (2010). In Sorry Bhai (2008), she played the role of "Sandy". The movie got critical acclaim and she too started getting offers.

She has played the double of Meher, named Shabana.

She played a prominent role of "Chanchal", aunt of the lead character "Siddharth Sood" (played by Abhishek Tiwari), in the serial called Chand Chupa Badal Mein (2010). She was also seen in the serial called Parrivaar... Kartavya Ki Pariksha.

== Filmography ==
=== Film ===
- Jungle (2000)
- Kuch Tum Kaho Kuch Hum Kahein (2002)
- Sorry Bhai! (2008)
- Once Upon A Time In Mumbaai (2010)
- Chhapaak (2020)
- Main Atal Hoon as Indira Gandhi (2024)

=== Television ===
| Year | Show | Role | Notes |
|---|---|---|---|
| 2004 - 2005 | Meher | Meher / Shabana | Lead Role |
| 2004 - 2005 | Kabhi Haan Kabhi Naa | Vandana | Supporting Role |
| 2005 | Saat Phere: Saloni Ka Safar | | Negative Role |
| 2005 - 2007 | Bhabhi | Manju Chatterjee (After Plastic Surgery) / Meenakshi Chatterjee / Meenakshi Tilak Chopra | Negative Role |
| 2007 | Sapna Babul Ka... Bidaai | Gayathri | Cameo Role |
| 2007 | Parrivaar | Ishita Chhabra / Ishita Pranay Kumar | Supporting Role |
| 2007 - 2008 | Chhoona Hai Aasmaan | Sunaina Aryaveerpratap Singh | Supporting Role |
| 2010 | Do Saheliyaan... Kismat Ki Kathputaliyaan | | Supporting Role |
| 2010 - 2011 | Chand Chupa Badal Mein | Chanchal Jawahar Sood | Negative Role |
| 2015 | Phir Bhi Na Maane...Badtameez Dil | Devki Purohit | Supporting Role |
| 2017 | Rishton Ka Chakravyuh | Daamo | Supporting Role |
| 2019 | Yeh Rishta Kya Kehlata Hai | Advocate Damini Mishra | Cameo Role |
| 2020 | Anupamaa | Parul Sharma - School Principal | Cameo Role |

=== Web series ===
| Year | Title | Role | Platform | Notes |
|---|---|---|---|---|
| 2019 | Parchhayee | Mrs Singh | ZEE5 | |
| 2025 | Crime Beat | Ashwini Mahaldar | ZEE5 | |

=== Theatre Play ===
| Year | Show | Role | Notes |
|---|---|---|---|
| 2009 | Jaise Kitabon Mein Mile | Meera | Main Role |
