= Suyyash Rai =

Indian actor and model

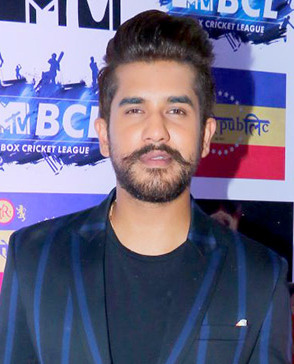
- Rai in 2017
- Born: 24 March 1989 (age 37); Chandigarh, India
- Occupations: Actor, singer
- Years active: 2010–2020
- Spouse: Kishwer Merchant (m. 2016)
- Children: 1

Suyyash Rai (born 24 March 1989) is an Indian television actor and singer. His first TV appearance was on Chandigarh auditions of Roadies 5.0. He is known for his role of Abhay on Rishta Likhenge Hum Naya on Sony TV. He was a contestant in Bigg Boss 9 in 2015.

== Career ==
Rai started his acting career on the popular Indian supernatural show Pyaar Kii Ye Ek Kahaani as Neil Khurana. He has appeared on many popular daily series like Kya Hua Tera Vaada and Kaisa Yeh Ishq Hai... Ajab Sa Risk Hai. He loves to play negative roles. He was seen in the series Phir Bhi Na Maane...Badtameez Dil on Star Plus. He was a contestant in Bigg Boss Season 9. He got evicted on Day 82.

He has walked several ramp shows and has also done many advertisements.

He has also captained cricket team Delhi Dragons in Box Cricket League, and led them to the title victory in BCL's maiden season aired on Sony TV.

Rai along with his then-girlfriend Kishwer Merchant entered the Bigg Boss 9 Double Trouble house. He was partnered up with Rimi Sen, then was changed with Prince Narula. Rai also appeared in action-thriller web series Dangerous in 2020.

== Personal life ==
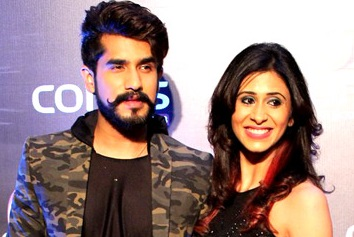
Suyyash Rai with his wife Kishwer Merchant

Rai got married on 16 December 2016 to Kishwer Merchant, his co-star from Pyaar Kii Ye Ek Kahaani. It was a simple court marriage followed by a reception with the mehndi and sangeet ceremonies.

On 2 March 2021 the couple announced that they were expecting their first child in August. On 27 August 2021, the couple became parents to a boy, Nirvair.

== Filmography ==
=== Web series ===
Year	Title	Role	Ref(s)
2020	Dangerous	Vishal Vashisht	

=== Television ===
Year	Name	Role	Notes	Ref
2007	MTV Roadies 5	Contestant	Not Selected	
2008	MTV Roadies 6	Contestant		
2009	MTV Splitsvilla 2	Contestant	Eliminated, 1st week	
2010–11	Pyaar Kii Ye Ek Kahaani	Neil Khurana		
2011	Geet – Hui Sabse Parayi	Himself	Guest	
2012–13	Kya Hua Tera Vaada	Pradeep		
2013	Yeh Hai Aashiqui	Karan	Episodic role	
2013	Yeh Hai Aashiqui - Season 1 (Episode 1: Tasveer)	Himself	Guest Appearance	
2013–14	Kaisa Yeh Ishq Hai... Ajab Sa Risk Hai	Himmat Singh Sangwan		
2014–15	Box Cricket League 1	Contestant	Winner	
2015-2016	Phir Bhi Na Maane...Badtameez Dil	Nissar		
2015-2016	Bigg Boss 9	Contestant	Entered Day 1, Evicted Day 84	
2016	Comedy Nights Bachao	Guest	To promote BCL2	
2016	Box Cricket League 2	Contestant	Winner	
2016	Box Cricket League Punjab	Contestant	Player in Ambarsariye Hawks	
2016	Desi Explorers	Himself		
2017	Ek Tha Raja Ek Thi Rani	Inspector Vijay Deshmukh		
2017	Pehredaar Piya Ki	Abhay Singh Rathore	Lead opposite Tejaswi Prakash	
2017–18	Rishta Likhenge Hum Naya	Abhay Singh Rathore	Lead opposite Tejaswi Prakash	
2018	Partners Trouble Ho Gayi Double	Raju Hatela		
2018	Box CricKet League 3	Contestant		
2018	Laal Ishq	Shawn		
2019	Box CricKet League 4	Contestant	Player	

== Discography ==
Rai and Kishwar Merchant debuted on his album Khushnuma. He also sang "Teri Meri Dosti" with Darshan Raval. In 2015, for his show Phir Bhi Na Maane...Badtameez Dil, Rai sang the song "Yaadein Teri (Jeene Ki Duaa)". He made his debut as a music composer in Loveyapa (2025) along with Siddharth which is followed by Baaghi 4 (2025).

=== Music Videos ===
Year	Song	Singer	Reference
2014	Khushnuma	Suyyash Rai/Kishwer Merchant	
2015	"Yaadein Teri (Jeene Ki Duaa)"	Suyyash Rai	
2017	"Beparwaahiyaan"	Suyyash Rai	
2020	Shukar kar	Suyyash Rai, Deepti Tuli, Oye Kunaal	
2020	Fitrat	Suyyash Rai, Darshan Raval, Divya Agarwal	

=== Films ===
- Loveyapa (2025) (Along with Siddharth)
- Baaghi 4 (2025) (Along with Siddharth) - 2 songs
