= I Luv My India =

- A promotional logo image of "I Luv My India"
- Genre: Comedy
- Written by: Damini K Shetty; Raaj Shetty; S Farhan
- Directed by: Meesha D Gautam
- Country of origin: India
- Original language: Hindi
- No. of seasons: 1
- No. of episodes: 60

Production
- Producers: Tony Singh; Deeya Singh
- Running time: 24 minutes

Original release
- Network: SAB TV
- Release: 20 February – 11 May 2012

I Luv My India is an Indian comedy television series, which made its debut in 2012 on SAB TV. It was created by Tony Singh and Deeya Singh's DJ's A Creative Unit and deals with the theme, "What happens when the west meets the east?" highlighting Indian value systems. The public launch function took place at Dilli Haat.

== Plot ==
The story is based on a NRI family which has been far away from Indian culture and India is suddenly forced to come back and adjust to all things Indian. It won't be hard to guess that it would be complete chaos. This is exactly the scenario where the Sethi family, who has been living in London for years, come back to India temporarily and then stay forever, and soon fall into several problems.

== Cast ==
Actor	Character	Details
Himani Shivpuri	Deep Sethi	The grandmother of Prem, Dimple and Jazzy, and a typical Punjabi housewife, a caring mother, hardcore patriot and complete Indian by heart. She believes that Indian culture is the best but is upset that her own family doesn't follow it. She wants her eldest grandson Prem to marry an Indian girl from Punjab so that at least there is someone after her who will try to infuse some Indian-ness in her family.
Arun Bali	Premnath Sethi	The grandfather of Prem, Dimple and Jazzy, and the eldest among the Sethi family. He has lived in London for 45 years after he had to sell off all his property for his sister's marriage. He believes in hard work, is a loving husband, stable, cool-headed, adaptable, fun loving person, doesn't like people who brag about themselves and is sarcastic with them. Premnath considers himself a British national first because he believes that London made him what he is today and it is his karmabhoomi. When it comes to India he can't hear a word against it.
Imran Khan	Ravindra Sethi	Premnath's eldest son and a responsible son of the family who has run the family business. He is close to his mother and has a little Indian-ness in him as he is the only son who has seen India and played in the fields. After his marriage, he follows his wife's view as she has made him realise that they should follow the culture where they live. He is always torn between his wife and mother as both want him to listen. He tries to stay away from their clashes as he knows both his wife and mother are right in their own way.
Dilnaz Irani	Vinny Sethi	Ravindra's wife and a very sophisticated British Indian whose family has lived in London for generations and have no idea about India or Indian culture. Vinny is very British in her behaviour from talking to eating to dressing. She respects her mother-in-law but doesn't like it when she forces them to follow Indian culture.
Ayaz Ahmed	Prem Sethi	The protagonist and Ravindra and Vinny's son. He is the most ladla grandson of Sethi family. He is smart, intelligent and ambitious about extending his grandfather's business. He knows that in the end he has to join the family business so he wants to take it slow, doesn't want to rush into things, enjoy his life and is a bit of a confused soul. He has a British girlfriend. A bit stubborn and is not fond of India as he has heard stories about India from his friends but somewhere there is a hidden Indian inside him who is jumping to come out. He loves his Dadi (grandma) and Dada (grandpa) a lot and listens to them.
Indresh Malik	Rajinder Sethi	Premnath's second son and the laziest and the most laidback person of the house. Has become so negative that he blames his Indian roots for the failure in the business, feels that if he had been a Britisher then his business would have been successful. When told to join the family business gives an excuse that he is insomniac and doesn't sleep in the night but the real reason is that he is always either eating, sleeping or watching TV due to which he is sleepless in the night. Always says that when he starts sleeping in the night he will start working. Premnath is a little fed up and has given up on him.
Anjali Mukhi	Simran Sethi a.k.a. Simmi	Rajinder's wife and a very loud, outspoken lady and a wannabe British obsessed with her own beauty. Simmi shifted to London for a few years before her marriage and wanted to be Miss India but couldn't and is now pushing her daughter to compete for Miss Britain. She thinks she is more beautiful than her daughter. Has a fake accent and tries to use big English words although she doesn't know their meaning. The young people of the family always correct her though she feels that they are fooling her. She wants to prove that she is better than Sweety and imitates her.
Rishi Dev	Jazzy Sethi	He is Rajinder's son and a 16-year-old teenage son; he bores his entire family with rap and talks in rap even in the toughest situation. He also makes rap of every possible old Bollywood songs which irritates his grandfather but deep encourages him, as at least he is improving his Hindi. He has a dream of becoming the next Punjabi pop star of UK and is in a college band.
Priyanka Udhwani	Dimple	Rajinder's daughter and Jazzy's sister. She is a simple girl with no ambition in life but she is forced to fulfill her mother's dream. She hates it when her mother puts her on a diet and makes her eats tasteless food so that she doesn't put on weight and her skin remains good. Dimple's dream is to marry a wealthy loving guy and have babies.
Rohan Tiwari	Surinder Sethi a.k.a. Sam	He is Premnath's youngest son and has crossed 35 years of age but has still not completed his MBBS. He gives free advice about medicines to his family that is always wrong. Most of the time he can't remember the names of the medicines and mixes it up. He decided to become a doctor because he thought that God has sent him to serve people on earth. His wanted to marry his girlfriend but she ditched him. Later she became a doctor. Sam now quickly wants to get his degree and marry some girl as he has almost crossed his marriageable age.
(unknown)	Harban	Premnath's sister in Punjab, who has been asked to look for a girl for Prem in India. Harban immediately takes the responsibility of finding a girl as she doesn't want them to come to India. She fears that if they come back she might lose all the property her brother gave her to look after. This fears her future and the future of her son, Jagtap who desperately and comically dreams of being an NRI.
Archana Taide	Pammi	The ayurvedic Hakim's daughter Pammi is a beautiful, vivacious girl with Indian values and integrity. She is a perfect match for Prem, as she knows her culture and tradition well and is the kind of girl who Prem's dadi (Deep) is looking out for. She is a girl who believes in god and humanity. She will fight for what is right and can't listen to anything against her country and will defend it with passion. She respects Deep and Premnath as they had helped her father set up the ayurvedic centre.
