= Suryaputra Karn =

Indian mythological television series

- Suryaputra Karn
- Genre: Mythology; Drama
- Created by: Siddharth Kumar Tewary
- Based on: Mrutyunjay by Shivaji Sawant; Mahabharata by Vyasa
- Written by: Mihir Buta Radhika Anand; Vinod Sharma; Utkarsh Naithani
- Directed by: Kamal Monga; Gautam Nagrath; Swapnil Mahaling; Sumit Thakur; Sunil Dharmadhikari; Gurpreet Rana; Kiran Gorde
- Creative director: Anish N surana
- Starring: See below
- Theme music composer: Lalin Nandi
- Country of origin: India
- Original language: Hindi
- No. of seasons: 1
- No. of episodes: 307

Production
- Producers: Siddharth Kumar Tewary; Gayatri Gill Tewary; Rahul Kumar Tewary
- Production locations: Mumbai, Maharashtra, India
- Camera setup: Multi-camera
- Running time: 24 minutes
- Production company: Swastik Pictures

Original release
- Network: Sony Entertainment Television
- Release: June 29, 2015 – August 7, 2016

Suryaputra Karn (transl. Son of Surya, Karna) is an Indian historical epic television series, which premiered on 29 June 2015 on Sony TV. Produced by Siddharth Kumar Tewary of Swastik Pictures, the series covers the life journey of Karna in the Mahabharata. The show starred Gautam Rode (adult Karna), Vishesh Bansal (young Karna) and Basant Bhatt (teenage Karna) as the lead character at various stages of his life.

== Premise ==
The story revolves around one of the best archer of the Mahabharata, Karna and narrates the entire story of Mahabharata from Karna and Pandavas' birth to the eventual crowning of Karna in the Swarga. The show covers the life journey of Karna on his way to becoming a great warrior.

He was the son of Surya and Kunti. He was born to Kunti before her marriage with Pandu. Kunti thus abandoned him. He was then saved by Adhirath, who was a charioteer. Karna since his childhood only decided to become an archer. He learnt archery from Lord Parshurama and lied him about his identity of being a Brahmin. But his lie was soon discovered and Parshurama cursed him. Lord Parshurama said to Karna ,"I, the son of Jamadagni, curse you that you will forgot the method of calling divine astras when you need them the most."

After that Duryodhana made him the king of Anga and befriended him. Later, Shakuni, devised a plan to insult Draupadi, wife of the Pandavas. They arranged a gambling where Yudhishthir lost all of his properties including Draupadi. Duryodhana asked Dushasan to disrobe her but failed as Lord Krishna saved her dignity. The Pandavas and Draupadi were sent for an exile of 13 years. This sowed the seeds of Mahabharata war.

Indra, in disguise of a Brahmin took Karna's armour and earrings. Later, he learned his true identity of Kunti and Surya's son but he decided to fight for Duryodhana blaming Yudhishthir for owing Draupadi. The Mahabharata war resulted in the death of Karna, Bheeshma, Drona, and many of the Kauravas. Thus, the Pandavas won the war. Yudhishthir was made the king of Hastinapura.

Gandhari cursed Krishna for destroying Kuru Vansh. Her curse showed result after 36 years and Krishna's dynasty also got destroyed. A hunter named Jara killed Krishna mistakenly. Thus, the Pandavas decided to go to heaven where they met the Kauravas and Karna. The show ended with Krishna's blessings to everyone.

== Cast ==
=== Main ===
- Gautam Rode as Karna: Surya and Kunti's son, Pandavas' half brother, Adhiratha and Radha's adopted son, Vrushali and Supriya's husband, Duryodhana's friend and the King of Anga; Vrishasena and Vrishaketu's father
  - Basant Bhatt as teenage Karna
  - Vishesh Bansal as a child Karna
- Saurabh Pandey as
  - Lord Krishna, Viratswaroop Narayan: Devaki and Vasudeva's son; Nanda and Yashoda's adopted son; Karna, Draupadi and Arjuna's friend
  - Paundraka; fake Lord, who preaches that Krishna is fake and he himseld is real Lord, Duryodhana's friend
- Malika Juneja as Supriya – Karna's first wife, Vrishasena's mother
- Farnaz Shetty as Vrushali: Karna's childhood friend-turned-second wife; Vrishaketu's mother
  - Richa Mehta as teenage Vrushali
  - Jagrati Sethia as Young Vrushali
- Gautam Rode as Vrishaketu – Karna and Vrushali's son, later the King of Anga

=== Recurring ===
- Aryamann Seth as Vichitravirya: King Shantanu and Queen Satyavati's son, Chitrangad's younger brother, and Ambika and Ambalika's husband.
- Shweta Gautam as Sudharma: Queen of Gandhar, Subala's wife, and Shakuni and Gandhari's mother.
- Priya Bathija as Kunti: Kuntibhoj's daughter; wife of Pandu; Karna's biological mother; Yudhisthira, Bhima, Arjuna, Nakula, and Sahadeva's mother; Balarama and Krishna's paternal aunt; Queen Mother of Hastinapura
- Kanan Malhotra as Yudhisthira: Dharmaraj, Kunti and Pandu's son, first Pandava, Draupadi's husband, Prativindhya's father, King of Indraprastha and later King of Hastinapura
  - Pravisht Mishra as young Yudhisthira
- Shaleen Bhanot as Duryodhana: Dhritarashtra and Gandhari's first son, eldest of the Kauravas, Crown Prince of Hastinapura, Karna's best friend, Bhanumati's husband and Laxmankumar, Lakshamana, and more sons/daughters' father
  - Yash Rajendra Karia as teenager or child Duryodhana
- Vishal Patni as Lord Shiva – Lord of Human and Animal Beings, Kirateshwar The Hunter
- Sailesh Gulabani as Sanjaya
- Ajay Jayram as Shakuni: Gandhari's brother, Kauravas's maternal uncle, Duryodhana's accomplice who is an expert in gambling, son of King Gubala
- Navi Bhangu as Arjuna: Indra, Kunti and Pandu's son, third Pandava, Draupadi and Subhadra's husband; Abhimanyu and Shrutkarma's father, Karna's arch-rival
  - Bhavesh Balchandani as young Arjuna
- Pankhuri Awasthy Rode as Draupadi: Dhrupad's daughter, Dhrishtadyumna's sister, Pandavas's common wife, Queen of Indraprastha and later Queen of Hastinapura, mother of Upapandavas
- Ketan Karande as Bhima: Vayu, Kunti and Pandu's son, second Pandava, Hidimba, and Draupadi's husband, Ghatotkach and Sutasoma's father
  - Shaunak David as young Bhima
- Buneet Kapoor as Nakula: Ashwinikumars, Madri and Pandu's son, fourth Pandava, Draupadi's husband, Shatanika's father
- Suchit V. Singh as Sahadeva: Ashwinikumars, Madri and Pandu's son, fifth Pandava, Draupadi's husband, Shrutasena's father
- Shubhi Ahuja as Bhanumati: Duryodhan's wife; Lakshmana and Lakshman Kumar's mother
- Basant Bhatt as Vrishasena: Karna and Supriya's eldest son died on the third day of the war by Arjuna.
- Sandeep Rajoral / Farooq Saeed as Lord Surya – Karna's biological father
- Mouli Ganguly / Hemaakshi Ujjain as Radha – Karna's foster mother, Shona's mother, Adhirath's wife
- Anand Suryavanshi as Adhirath – Karna's foster father, Shon's father, Radha's husband, Bhishma's charioteer
- Meghan Jadhav as Abhimanyu – Arjun and Subhadra's son, Krishna and Balarama's nephew, Uttara's husband, Parikshit's father
- Alice Kaushik as Uttarā – Virat and Sudeshna's daughter, Uttar's sister, Abhimanyu's wife, Parikshit's mother
- Babloo Mukherjee as Ucchasena – Adhirath's brother, Radha's brother-in-law, Karna and Shon's uncle
- Ujjwal Gauraha as Visheshan – King of Sut Society where Karna was raised in childhood
- Aditya Kapadia as Shon – Karna's foster brother
  - Uzair Basar As child Shon
- Riva Bubber as Priyamvada – Kunti's maid
- Daya Shankar Pandey as Shani – Surya's son, Karna's brother
- Rumi Khan as Madhyam
- Hirdeyjeet Jarnail Singh as Vrishbhan – Vrushali's father
- Naved Aslam as Bhishma – Great-uncle (grandfather figure) of Pandavas and Kauravas, Shantanu and Ganga's son
- Aditi Govitrikar as Ganga- Bhishma's mother, Shantanu's wife
- Paras Thukral as Dhritarashtra – Son Of Ambika and Vichitravirya, King of Hastinapur, Gandhari's husband, father of the Kauravas and Dushala
- Sandeep Arora as Vikarna – Third Kaurava prince, King Dhritarashtra and Queen Gandhari's third son and Duryodhan and Dushasna's younger brother, Dushyala's elder brother
- Manish Bishla as Yuyutsu: Dhritarashtra and Sugadha's son, Duryodhana's younger stepbrother and other Kauravas's elder stepbrother fought for Pandavas and remained alive.
- Smriti Sinha Vatsa as Gandhari – Shakuni's sister, Dhritarashtra's wife, Queen of Hastinapura, mother of the Kauravas and Dushala
- Garima Jain as Dushala
- Anuj Sharma as Vidur – Younger brother Dritarashtra and Pandu, Prime Minister of Hastinapura
- Nimai Bali as Dronacharya – Guru of Pandavas and Kauravas, Ashwathama's father, Kripi's Husband
- Chandni Sharma as Kripi – Drona's wife and Kripa's sister
- Kunal Bakshi as Ashwatthama – Son of Dronacharya and Kripi, Duryodhana's friend, Student of Dronacharya too
- Hemant Choudhary as Kripacharya – Drona's brother-in-law, Kripi's brother
- Surendra Pal as Parshuram – Guru of Bhishma, Drona, Karna, and Kripa
- Kamaljeet Rana as Dushasan Dhritarashtra and Gandhari's second son, youngest of the Kauravas, Duryodhana's younger brother
- Jay Thakkar as a child Dushasan
- Raj Premi as Drupad – King of Panchala; Shikandini, Drishtadymna, and Draupadi's father
- Payal Rohatgi as Shikhandini/Shikhandi – Daughter of Drupad, Dristadyumna and Draupadi's elder sister
- Vicky Batra / Akash Sharma as Dhrishtadyumna – Drupad's son, Shikandini, and Draupadi's brother
- Vikramjeet Virk as Jarasandha – King of Magadha, Brihadhrata's son
- Dinesh Mehta as Jayadratha – Dushala's husband, Kauravas' brother-in-law, King Of Sindhu, Vriddhakshatra's son
- Deblina Chatterjee/Aishwarya Sharma Bhatt as Urvashi
- Karan Sharma as Virata – King of the Matsya kingdom, Sudeshna's husband, Uttara, and Uttar's father
- Jaswinder Gardner as Sudeshna – Virata's wife, Queen of the Matsya kingdom, Uttara and Uttar's mother
- Vishal Kotian as Lord Hanuman: Rama's devotee, Vayu's son, and Bheema's elder spiritual brother.
- Sachin Verma as Lord Indra – King of the Devtas, Arjun's father
- Kunal Bhatia as Lord Agni – God of fire. Drishtadyumna and Draupadi's father
- Niel Satpuda as Prativindhya: Yudhishthira, Draupadi's son, and the Eldest Upapandava.
- Aman Sharma as Sutasoma: Bheema and Draupadi's son.
- Jay Joshi as Shatanika: Nakula and Draupadi's son.
- Akshay Batchua as Shrutasena: Sahadeva and Draupadi's son.
- Yagya Saxena as Eklavya: A devoted student of Drona who gives away his thumb as Guru Dakshina, son Of Hridaydhanush and Nishad Prince.
- Ashwin Patil as Uttar – Virat and Sudeshna's son, Uttara's brother
- Zohaib Siddiqui as Kichaka – Sudeshna's brother, Commander-in-chief of the Matsya kingdom army
- Malhar Pandya as Balarama – Krishna's elder brother
- Richa Mukherjee as Lakshmanaa – Duryodhana and Bhanumati's daughter, Samba's wife, Krishna's daughter-in-law
- Aayush Shah/Shresth Kumar as Samba – Krishna's son, Lakshmanaa's husband
- Aniruddh Dave as Shishupala, King Of Chedi, Son Of King Damaghosha
- Tarakesh Chauhan as Vishwakarma
- Kaushik Chakraborty as Shalya – Pandavas' maternal uncle, King of Madra
- Vikram Soni as Prativindhya – Yudishtira and Draupadi's son
- Ayush Shrivastava as Shrutkarma – son of Arjun and Draupadi
- Akbar Ali as Ghatotkach – Bheem and Himdimba's son
- Vashu Chauhan as Barbareek – Ghatotkach's son

== Production ==
Karanvir Bohra, Karan Grover, Karan Tacker, Avinesh Rekhi and Aditya Redij were approached for playing the lead role of Karna, but Gautam Rode was signed for the eponymous role. In 2015, Gautam Rode won the Best Actor in a Historical Serial award in Indian Telly Awards for the show. The show was intended to be a finite series of 150 episodes but was extended up to August due to a rise in the ratings.

== Awards ==
| Year | Award | Category | Recipient | Result | Ref. |
|---|---|---|---|---|---|
| 2016 | Indian Telly Awards | Best Actor-popular | Gautam Rode | Won | |
| 2016 | Asiavision Awards | Best Actor National | Gautam Rode | Won | |
