= Pandava Vanavasam =

1965 Telugu film by Kamalakara Kameswara Rao

- Theatrical release poster
- Directed by: Kamalakara Kameswara Rao
- Written by: Samudrala Sr
- Produced by: A. S. R. Anjaneyulu
- Starring: N. T. Rama Rao; Savitri; S. V. Ranga Rao
- Cinematography: C. Nageswara Rao
- Edited by: A. Sanjeevi; Veerappa; Ankineedu
- Music by: Ghantasala
- Production company: Madhavi Productions
- Release date: 14 January 1965
- Running time: 198 minutes
- Country: India
- Language: Telugu

Pandava Vanavasam (transl. The exile of the Pandavas) is a 1965 Indian Telugu-language Hindu mythological film directed by Kamalakara Kameswara Rao and written by Samudrala Sr. Produced by A. S. R. Anjaneyulu, the film is based on the Mahabharata and depicts events from the Pandavas' exile. It features N. T. Rama Rao as Bheema, Savitri as Draupadi, and S. V. Ranga Rao as Duryodhana, with Gummadi, M. Balayya, Prabhakar Reddy, and Mikkilineni in supporting roles. Hema Malini made her Telugu debut with a dance performance in the film. The music was composed by Ghantasala.

Released on 14 January 1965, the film was a major commercial success, completing 100 days in 24 centres and running for 175 days in several theaters. It was praised for its narrative and performances, becoming one of the highest-grossing Telugu films of its time. The film's popularity led to multiple re-releases, reportedly being screened nearly 20 times since its original release.

== Plot ==
The film opens with the Pandavas completing the Rajasuya Yaga and expressing their gratitude to Krishna for his support. Meanwhile, Duryodhana, humiliated by his experience at the Mayasabha, is consoled by Sakuni, who devises a plan to invite Dharmaraju to a dice game. In the game, Dharmaraju loses his kingdom, wealth, and even his family, including Draupadi, leading to her humiliation. The Pandavas are subsequently exiled after Dharmaraju loses again in a rematch.

During their exile, Bhima encounters Anjaneya and retrieves the Sowgandhika Pushpam to fulfill Draupadi's wish. Elsewhere, Duryodhana attempts to disrupt the Pandavas' exile by staying nearby and mocking them, but his plan backfires when he is captured by Gandharva king Chitrasena. Despite their enmity, Dharmaraju sends Bhima and Arjuna to rescue him, which deeply wounds Duryodhana's pride. He contemplates self-immolation but is consoled by Karna and Sakuni, who realise Krishna's divine influence over the Pandavas.

Later, Saindhava, the husband of Dussala, becomes infatuated with Draupadi and abducts her after she rejects his advances. Bhima rescues Draupadi and is about to kill Saindhava, but Dharmaraju orders him to spare Saindhava in accordance with dharma. Bhima punishes Saindhava by humiliating him and expelling him from their presence.

In a parallel subplot, the Kauravas conspire to alienate Krishna from the Pandavas by arranging a marriage between Duryodhana's son, Lakshmana Kumara, and Sasirekha, the daughter of Balarama, Krishna's elder brother. However, Sasirekha's marriage had already been arranged with Abhimanyu, Arjuna's son. To thwart the plan, Krishna advises Bhima to send Ghatothkacha to impersonate Sasirekha and disrupt the wedding with his antics. Ultimately, Sasirekha and Abhimanyu are successfully married.

The film concludes with the Pandavas completing their twelve-year exile and looking forward to reclaiming their rightful place.

== Cast ==
- N. T. Rama Rao as Bhima
- Savitri as Draupadi
- S. V. Ranga Rao as Duryodhana
- Kantha Rao as Krishna
- V. Nagayya as Vidura
- Rajanala as Saindhava
- Gummadi as Dharmaraju
- Dhulipala as Chitrasena
- Mukkamala as Durvasa Maharshi
- Mudigonda Lingamurthy as Sakuni
- Prabhakar Reddy as Karna
- M. Balayya as Arjuna
- Satyanarayana as Ghatotkacha
- Haranath as Abhimanyu
- Mikkilineni as Dussasana
- Ramana Reddy as Brahandam
- Padmanabham as Lakshmana Kumara
- Allu Ramalingaiah as Pindandam
- Vanisri as Satyabhama
- L. Vijayalakshmi as Sasirekha
- Sandhya as Bhanumati
- Rushyendramani as Gandhari
- Rajasulochana as Dancer
- Hema Malini as Dancer

== Production ==
Pandava Vanavaasam was directed by Kamalakara Kameswara Rao and written by Samudrala Raghavacharya. The film was produced by A. S. R. Anjaneyulu under the Madhavi Productions banner. The project assembled a star-studded cast, with N. T. Rama Rao portraying Bheema, Savitri as Draupadi, S. V. Ranga Rao as Duryodhana, Gummadi as Dharma Raju, M. Balayya as Arjuna, Prabhakar Reddy as Karna, and Mikkilineni as Dussasana. The film marked the Telugu debut of Hema Malini, who performed a dance sequence during the "Ghosha Yatra" scene, entertaining Duryodhana and his entourage. Rajasulochana also appeared in a dance sequence.

K. Raghavendra Rao, who would later go on to direct over 100 films, began his career as an assistant director under Kamalakara Kameswara Rao for this film.

== Music ==
Pandava Vanavasamu

Film score by Ghantasala
- Released: 1965
- Genre: Soundtrack
- Length: 44:48
- Label: Saregama Audio
- Producer: Ghantasala

Music for the film was composed by Ghantasala. Audio soundtrack was released on Saregama label.

S. No.	Song title	Lyrics	Singers	length
1	"Himagiri Sogasulo"	Samudrala Sr	Ghantasala, P. Susheela	4:30
2	"Devaa Deena Baandhava"	Samudrala Sr.	P. Leela	3:42
3	"Vidhi Vanchithulai"	Samudrala Sr.	Ghantasala	4:33
4	"Mahinele Maharaju"	Samudrala Sr.	P. Leela, L. R. Eswari	4:48
5	"Manojavam Maruthatulyam"	Traditional	Ghantasala	2:34
6	"Oh Vannekaada"	Samudrala Sr.	S. Janaki	5:51
7	"Raagaalu Melavimpa"	Samudrala Sr.	Ghantasala, P. Susheela	3:39
8	"Mogali Rekula Sigadhaana"	Kosaraju	Ghantasala, L. R. Eswari	7:20
9	"Naa Chandamama"	Samudrala Sr.	Ghantasala, P. Susheela	4:43
10	"Baava Baava Panneeru"	Aarudhra	P. Susheela, Padmanabham	2:58
11	"Krishna"	Aarudhra	P. Susheela	2:58

== Reception ==
=== Critical reception ===
Pandava Vanavaasam was well-received for its narrative and performances. N. T. Rama Rao's portrayal of Bheema garnered attention for his distinct transformation in dialogue delivery and body language. The interactions between Bheema and Dharma Raju, along with Arjuna's role in the story, were noted as significant aspects of the film. Performances by S. V. Ranga Rao, Gummadi, and Savitri were also praised.

=== Box office ===
The film had a successful theatrical run, completing 100 days in 24 centres and reaching a 175-day milestone in several locations. It was among the highest-grossing films of its time and was re-released multiple times over the years, reportedly being screened around 20 times since its initial release.

Pandava Vanavaasam was released a week after Naadi Aada Janme, which featured the same lead cast of N. T. Rama Rao, S. V. Ranga Rao, and Savitri.
