= Draupadi (TV series) =

- Genre: Mythology
- Developed by: Prem Krishen; Sunil Mehta
- Written by: Kamalesh Pandey
- Directed by: Surendra Mohan
- Starring: Mrinal Kulkarni; Rahul Bhat; Vindu Dara Singh; Shahbaz Khan; Rajesh Shringarpure; Pankaj Dheer; Deepak Jethi; Kaushal Kapoor; Ravi Jhankal; Arup Pal; Parikshit Sahni; Mahendra Sandhu; Usha Bachani
- Country of origin: India
- Original language: Hindi
- No. of seasons: 1
- No. of episodes: 36

Production
- Producer: Vijay Kashyap
- Cinematography: Kishore Kapadia; V.K. Murthy
- Editor: Santosh Singh
- Running time: 45 minutes (approx)

Original release
- Network: Sahara One
- Release: 2001 – 2002

Draupadi is a mythological Indian television series that ran for two years from 2001 to 2002 on Sahara One. It was produced by Vijay Kashyap and directed by Surendra Mohan. The music was composed by Talat Aziz and Jaspinder Narula sang the title song. The serial is based on the Odia novel Yajnaseni by Pratibha Ray.

== Cast ==
- Mrinal Kulkarni as Draupadi
- Rahul Bhat as Krishna
- Rajesh Shringarpure as Arjun
- Arup Pal as Yudhishthir
- Vindu Dara Singh as Bheem
- Shahbaz Khan as Karna
- Sudhir Mittoo as Jaydrath
- Pankaj Dheer as Bhishma
- Deepak Jethi as Duryodhan
- Kaushal Kapoor as Dushasan
- Ravi Jhankal as Shakuni
- Qasim Ali as Dhrishtadyumna
- Parikshit Sahni as Drupad
- Mahendra Sandhu as Drona
- Usha Bachani as Hidimba
- Neha Sharad as Rukmini
- Mona Parekh as Saibhya
- Sharmilee Raj as Subhadra
- Maya Alagh as Kunti
- Jyoti Joshi as Rituvati
- Pankaj Kalra as Kashiraj
- Narendra Sachar as Balram
- Anu Kashyap as Satyabhama
- Sandesh Nayak as Nakul
- Armaan Anwar Khan as Uddhav
- Raj Hussain
- Ashok Punjabi
- Priyanka Srivastav
- Upma Srivastav
- Vishnu Sharma as Dhritarashtra
- Vijay Kashyap as Vidur
- Ahmed Khan as Jarasandh
- Somesh Agarwal
- Nayan Bhatt as Satyavati
- Amita Nangia as Gandhari
- Anil Kochar as Satyadev
- Sonia Rakkar as Kapila
- Aartii Naagpal as Dushala
- Sona Batra as Bhanumati
- Madhu Bharti as Pingala
- Rahul Bose
- Asha Bachani as Shikhandi & Amba
- Bharat Arora
- Priyanka Singh as Priyamvada
- Ramesh Goyal as Karkotak
- Sajid Shah
- Sunil Raj
- Dilip Mehra
- Vindu Sharma
- Prashant Jaiswal
- Sumeet Mittal as Sahadev
- Neeraj Sood
- Tripti Agarwal as Nitambini
- Pradeep Shukla
- Chandrakant Thakkar
- Sujata Thakkar as Revati
- Veena Kapoor as Devaki
- Jeetendra Shrimali

== See also ==
- Mahabharat (1988 TV series)
