= Karnan (1964 film) =

1964 film by B. R. Panthulu

- Theatrical release poster
- Directed by: B. R. Panthulu
- Screenplay by: A. S. Nagarajan; Sakthi T. K. Krishnasamy
- Based on: Mahabharata
- Produced by: B. R. Panthulu
- Starring: Sivaji Ganesan; N. T. Rama Rao; Savitri; Devika; M. V. Rajamma; S. A. Ashokan; R. Muthuraman
- Cinematography: V. Ramamurthy
- Edited by: R. Devarajan
- Music by: Viswanathan–Ramamoorthy
- Production company: Padmini Pictures
- Distributed by: Sivaji Films
- Release date: 14 January 1964
- Running time: 177–180 minutes (Note: While the film's runtime is listed in Encyclopaedia of Indian Cinema as 177 minutes, the 2012 restored version reviewed by New Straits Times' K. Vijayan is 180 minutes.)
- Country: India
- Language: Tamil
- Budget: est.₹4 million

Karnan is a 1964 Indian Tamil-language epic Hindu mythological film produced and directed by B. R. Panthulu. It stars Sivaji Ganesan leading an ensemble cast consisting of N. T. Rama Rao, S. A. Ashokan, R. Muthuraman, Savitri, Devika and M. V. Rajamma. The film is based on the story of Karna, a character from the Hindu epic Mahabharata.

Karnan, which was officially launched in 1963, was shot in palaces at Jaipur and the war sequences were filmed in Kurukshetra, which featured several soldiers from the Indian Army. The film's original soundtrack was composed by the duo Viswanathan–Ramamoorthy, while the lyrics were written by Kannadasan. The screenplay was written by A. S. Nagarajan and the dialogues by Sakthi T. K. Krishnasamy. The film was the first in Tamil to be entirely shot and released in Eastmancolor.

Karnan was released on 14 January 1964, during the festival of Pongal. The film ran for over 100 days in theatres, and later won the Certificate of Merit for the Third Best Feature Film at the 11th National Film Awards. It was considered a milestone in Tamil cinema as it brought together the then leading actors of South Indian cinema, Ganesan and Rama Rao. The film was also partly responsible for a resurgence in films based on Hindu epics in the industry. A digitised version of Karnan was released in March 2012 to critical and commercial success.

== Plot ==
The unmarried princess Kunti is seen taking away a small open box with a live baby boy inside it; she had earlier got a boon from the sage Durvasa for her pious service to him. Kunti could invoke a mantra and be blessed with a child from any male god of her choice. When she tested it playfully, she was blessed by the Sun with the baby, which she abandons in the Ganges to avoid embarrassment. The baby is rescued and adopted by royal charioteer Adirathan, who names him Karnan.

Years later, Karnan feels heartbroken upon realising that Adhirathan is only his adoptive father. Not wanting to become a charioteer like him, he instead chooses to become a warrior, travels to another kingdom and trains there. Four years later, having mastered archery, Karnan returns home. At the same time, a royal tournament is held to portray the valour of royal princes, who have just completed education from guru Dronacharyar. Once there, Karnan challenges the Pandava prince Arjunan in an archery contest, since everyone there has been hailing Arjunan as the best archer ever. Karnan is insulted and refused a chance because of his lowly birth, but the Kaurava crown prince and cousin of the Pandavas, Duryodhanan, saves his pride, and crowns Karnan as the king of Anga. A grateful Karnan thus becomes a close friend of Duryodhanan and his wife Bhanumati.

One day, Indran, disguised as a Brahmin, approaches Karnan and asks for his armour and ear ornaments as alms to weaken and prevent him from overpowering Arjuna. Although aware of Indra's intention, Karnan still gives both of the articles that he was born with and which made him invincible. Pleased with Karnan's generosity, Indra gives him a powerful weapon, the Nagastra. Disguised as a Brahmin, Karnan becomes the student of Parashuramar to acquire the Brahmastra; Parashuramar eventually realises that Karnan is a Kshatriya, a tribe he opposes. Enraged, he renders Karnan incapable of using the Brahmastra when most needed, and banishes him.

Karnan later saves princess Subhangi from an uncontrolled chariot; they fall in love and eventually marry. A few years later, Krishnan, a supporter of the Pandavas, learns about Karnan's true background. He tells Kunti that Karnan is her first-born son. Karnan also learns about his birth later. Kunti meets Karnan and gets two wishes from him, one that he will not attack any of her sons (the Pandavas) except Arjunan during the impending Kurukshetra War, and that he will attack Arjunan with the Nagastra only once. Karnan refuses to join the Pandavas and remains the friend of their enemy Duryodhanan.

Before the war begins, Duryodhanan's ministers assemble to appoint the commanders of the army divisions. Bhishmar is appointed the Commander and he starts nominating generals for different battalions. Karnan is insulted because of his lowly birth and given the command of a low rank infantry. The war begins and in the early days, Bhishma retires and Karnan replaces him. The following day, Karnan goes to war accompanied by his son Vrishasenan who fights bravely, but is killed by Arjunan.

The next day, Karnan tries to kill Arjunan with the Nagastra, but Krishnan prevents the weapon from hurting him. Since Karnan cannot use the Nagastra more than once, he is unable to kill Arjunan. A wheel of his chariot gets stuck in a hole, and he steps down to relieve it. Under Krishnan's direction, Arjunan shoots multiple arrows at Karnan that severely wound him, but Karnan still stays alive. Krishnan tells a shocked Arjunan that the Dharma that Karnan performed during his lifetime was protecting his life. Krishnan disguises as a Brahmin, goes to Karnan and asks him his virtues as donation. Karnan generously donates all his virtues to the "Brahmin". Arjunan then shoots a few more arrows at Karnan that kill him.

The Pandavas, who realise that Karnan was their eldest brother, mourn his death. Kunti does the same, while Subhangi dies, traumatised by her husband's death. Arjunan remorses killing Karnan, until Krishnan reveals that the curses by Indran and Parashuramar were also responsible for his death. The film ends with Karnan meeting his father — the Sun — in the afterlife.

== Cast ==
Cast according to the opening credits

- Sivaji Ganesan as Karnan
- N. T. Rama Rao as Krishnan
- Savitri Ganesh as Duryodhanan's wife, Bhanumati
- Devika as Karnan's wife, Subhangi
- M. V. Rajamma as Kunti Devi
- Ashokan as Duryodhanan
- Muthuraman as Arjunan
- O. A. K. Thevar as Kanagan
- Javar Seetharaman as Bhishmar
- Muthaiah as Shakuni
- K. Natarajan as Charioteer Adhirathan
- Mustafa as Kripachariar
- Veerasami as Dronachariar
- R. Balasubramaniam as Parashuramar
- V. S. Raghavan as Vidurar
- S. V. Ramadas as Indran
- S. A. G. Sami as Dhritarashtran
- Kannan as Sanjayan
- Prem Kumar as Dharuman
- Sandow Indrajith as Bhiman
- Thangaraj as Nakulan
- Chinnaiah as Sahadevan
- Shanmugasundaram as Shallian
- K. V. Srinivasan as Sage
- Master Sridhar as Meganathan
- Master Suresh as Vrishasenan
- Master Babu as Vrishasenan (first)
- Prabhakar Reddy as Suryan
- Sobhan Babu as Chandran
- Sriram as Iyer
- Samikannu as Iyer
- Pazha. Selva Raj as Durmukhan
- Kuladeivam Rajagopal as Kabandhan
- Professor Ramamurthi as the archery expert
- Sandhya as Veni, Kanagan's wife
- Rukmani as Adhirathan's wife, Radhai
- G. Sakunthala as Friend Mangala
- Jayanthi as Draupadi
- Kalpana as Fairy Goddess
- Rajeswari as Friend Satyavati
- K. V. Saroja as Young Kunti

== Production ==
=== Development ===
The screenwriter A. S. Nagarajan wrote a story Arthajamam with the intention of making it a film and presented it to director-producer B. R. Panthulu of Padmini Pictures, who liked the story and paid Nagarajan an advance. Both planned to cast Sivaji Ganesan as the lead actor, but after hearing the story, he was unwilling to "take a risk" and asked Panthulu to instead make a film version of the novel Paavai Vilakku. Instead, Panthulu decided to make Karnan, based on the life of the character Karna from the Hindu epic Mahabharata, and Nagarajan was retained as screenwriter due to his expertise on the subject, while Sakthi T. K. Krishnasamy wrote the dialogues. The film was officially launched in 1963 at Vijaya Studios in Chennai. Panthulu also collected information from scholars Kirupanandha Variyar and Sengalipuram Anantarama Dikshitar. The film's art director was Ganga, the cinematographer was V. Ramamurthy, and R. Devarajan was the editor.

=== Casting and filming ===
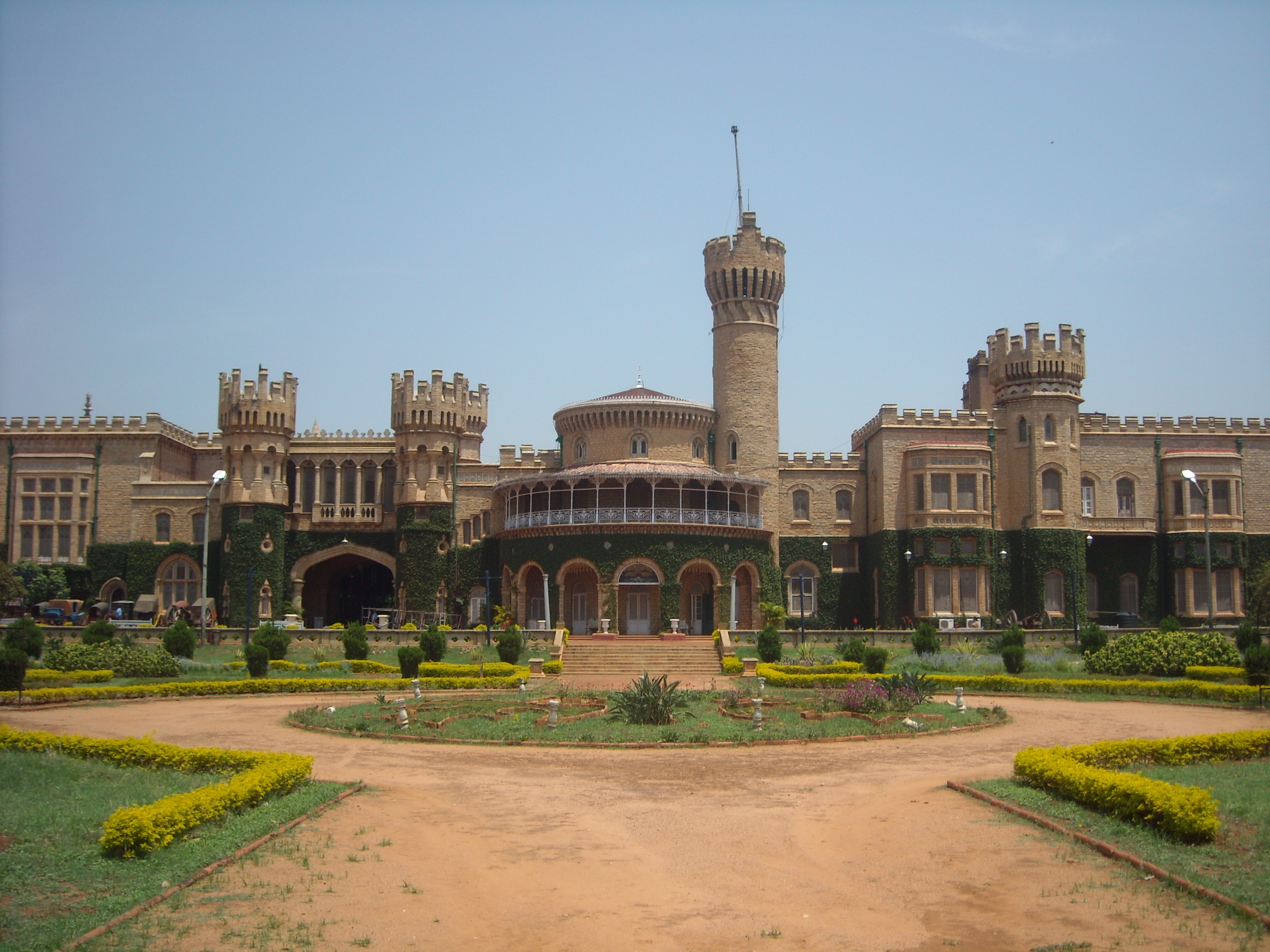
Karnan was the first film to be shot at the Bangalore Palace.

K. V. Srinivasan played a minor role as the sage who christens the lead character as Karnan. He also dubbed for the voice of N. T. Rama Rao, who portrays Krishnan, after Ganesan's insistence with Panthulu. Shanmugasundaram said he was recommended by Ganesan to Panthulu for the role of the charioteer Shallian. He believed Panthulu accepted him as he had the required physique for the role. V. S. Raghavan, who portrayed Vidhurar, recalled going deep into character for one scene requiring him to walk out of the royal court in anger: "I got so involved in the character that even after the shot was over I kept walking", and calmed down only after Rama Rao stopped and questioned him. The then six-year-old Master Sridhar, appears in a single scene as Meganathan, an orphan who meets Karnan after being accused of setting fire to a school. Sridhar finished his long scene in one take, and was paid ₹1000 (valued at about US$210 in 1964 (Note: The exchange rate between 1948 and 1966 was 4.79 Indian rupees (₹) per 1 US dollar (US$).)) for the performance.

Karnan was filmed with an estimated budget of ₹4 million (valued at about US$840 000.84 in 1964). The high cost of the film was attributed to the transportation costs incurred to move chariots from Chennai to Kurukshetra, where the war sequences were filmed. Permission from the government was sought, cavalry and infantry from the Indian Army were brought to the locations at Kurukshetra and the first rows of the charging armies on horses and elephants had soldiers from the Indian Army. The battle scenes were shot with troupes of the 61 Cavalry Regiment, using 80 elephants, 400 horses and three cameras. Other scenes were shot at palaces in Jaipur. Shooting for Karnan also took place at the Bangalore Palace, making it the first film to be shot there. The disrobing of Draupadi from the Mahabharata was filmed but later scrapped as it was feared the scene would depict India in a negative light.

According to Panthulu's son Ravishankar, a 2-minute sequence took as many as four days to shoot, because of the large number of personnel involved. After the release of Karnan, all the chariots made for the war sequences in Kurukshetra, were donated to the Brihadisvara Temple, Thanjavur. The film was processed at Filmcenter in Bombay, and was the first Tamil film to be colourised using Eastmancolor. Its final length was 4,876 metres (15,997 ft).

== Music ==
Viswanathan–Ramamoorthy (a duo consisting of M. S. Viswanathan and T. K. Ramamoorthy) composed the music of Karnan, while the lyrics were written by Kannadasan. The songs were recorded using various instruments like Sarangi, Santoor, Shehnai, Dilruba and others that were rarely used in Tamil films. The songs "Ullathil Nalla Ullam" and "Aayiram Karangal" were written first and tuned later; for the other songs, Kannadasan wrote lines to fit the tune. He completed all the lyrics for the songs in two days. The entire soundtrack was completed within three days.

The songs are set in various Hindustani and Carnatic ragas: "En Uyir Thozhi" is set in Hamir Kalyani, "Maharajan" in Kharaharapriya, "Kangal Engey" in Suddha Dhanyasi, "Iravum Nilavum" in Shuddha Sarang, "Ullathil Nalla Ullam" in Ahir Bhairav, "Poi Vaa Magale" in Anandabhairavi, "Kannuku Kulam Yedu" in Pahadi, and "Naanichivandhana" in Darbari Kanada.

Track listing
| No. | Title | Singer(s) | Length |
|---|---|---|---|
| 1. | "En Uyir Thozhi" | P. Susheela | 3:45 |
| 2. | "Iravum Nilavum" | T. M. Soundararajan, P. Susheela | 3:47 |
| 3. | "Kangal Engey" | P. Susheela | 4:53 |
| 4. | "Kannuku Kulam Yedu" | P. Susheela | 4:09 |
| 5. | "Maharajan" | T. M. Soundararajan, P. Susheela | 3:22 |
| 6. | "Mazhai Kodukkum" | Trichy Loganathan, Sirkazhi Govindarajan | 6:56 |
| 7. | "Manjal Mugam" | P. Susheela | 4:24 |
| 8. | "Maranathai Eni" | Sirkazhi Govindarajan | 3:04 |
| 9. | "Poi Vaa Magale" | Soolamangalam Rajalakshmi | 3:44 |
| 10. | "Ullathil Nalla Ullam" | Sirkazhi Govindarajan | 3:51 |
| 11. | "Naanichivandhana" | Thiruchi Loganathan | 1:15 |
| 12. | "Parithraannaaya" | Sirkazhi Govindarajan | 0:42 |
| 13. | "Aayiram Karangal Neeti" | T. M. Soundararajan, Sirkazhi Govindarajan, Thiruchi Loganathan, P. B. Sreenivas | 1:27 |
| 14. | "Ennakoduppan" | P. B. Sreenivas | 1:31 |
| 15. | "Malargal Sutti" | P. Susheela | 1:19 |
| 16. | "Mannavar Porulkalai" | T. M. Soundararajan | 2:47 |
| Total length: | | | 50:56 |

== Release ==
Karnan was released on 14 January 1964 during the festival occasion of Pongal, and distributed by Sivaji Films. Ganesan's own Shanti Theatre in Chennai, which released the film, had a 60 feet (18 m) tall banner of a chariot to attract the audience. Ganesan promoted the film by distributing sakkarai pongal to those who came to Shanti to attend the first screening. The film was dubbed in Telugu as Karna, and also in Hindi as Dhaan Veer Karna.

== Reception ==
=== Critical reception ===
The critic from The Indian Express wrote on 17 January 1964, "Reproducing the incidents from the Mahabharatha, the film has all the aspects demanded by the subject", adding that Panthulu had not spared any effort to do justice to the theme, and was appreciative of Ganga's art direction and Ramamurthy's cinematography. The critic from Ananda Vikatan wrote that while the film's effort to improve the quality of Tamil cinema quality was praiseworthy, they could not see the dignity of the epic, only the dominance of the extravaganza. In a review dated 8 February 1964, T. M. Ramachandran of Sport and Pastime praised the film's extravaganza but added, "What fundamentally makes a film truly great is its absorbing presentation without a dull moment. This aspect seems to have been lost sight of by the makers." Despite being released theatrically in 1964, the film won the Certificate of Merit for the Third Best Feature Film at the 11th National Film Awards, which honoured films released in 1963.

=== Box office ===
In its theatrical run, Karnan completed 100 days in four theatres, including Madurai Thangam (noted as the second largest theatre in Asia during 1964), and Shanthi. In spite of a successful run after completing 80 days, the film was removed from twelve theatres to allow the release of Pachhai Vilakku, another Sivaji Ganesan film. At Madurai Thangam, Karnan earned totally ₹186,805.62 after its 14-week run there. Despite the film running for over 100 days in theatres, critics like Baradwaj Rangan and The Times of India's M. Suganth state that the film was a box office failure during its release.

== Home media ==
Karnan was released on DVD by Raj Video Vision. A "5.1 Channel EDS Sound" enhanced version was also released by the same company, featuring English subtitles. Karnan is also included alongside various Sivaji Ganesan-starrers in the compilation DVD 8 Ulaga Adhisayam Sivaji, which was released in May 2012.

== Re-release ==
Karnan made a huge impact on me during my childhood. With the help of technology, I wanted to bring the film back to the big screens to give audiences a taste of the movie's grandeur and valuable message ... Most of our films have become so damaged that we will never be able to see them on the big screen. A classic example is Thillana Mohanambal, whose prints have been totally damaged. I'm happy that I was able to save Karnan which I'm sure will last for 100 more years after this restoration.

— Shanthi Chokkalingam, in an interview with The Times of India

A digitally restored version of Karnan was released on 16 March 2012, to commemorate the birth centenary of Panthulu. It is the first Tamil film to be fully digitally restored, costing ₹4 million (US$42,000) and consuming an effort of three years. The effort was undertaken by film distributor Shanthi Chokkalingam, who stated, "The sound negative was totally gone and the five to six reels from the picture negative were damaged to a great extent". Shanthi, who had previously re-released many of M. G. Ramachandran's films, chose to re-release Karnan because of "the emphasis it places on friendship and loyalty". The digital restoration of Karnan took place at Sangeetha Sound Studios in Chennai, after a failed attempt with the Mumbai-based Famous Studios, who earlier restored the 1960 Hindi film Mughal-e-Azam. Visual improvements and audio restoration were excessively worked upon, with Shanthi stating that the "biggest challenge was to restore the background score". DVDs were also used to get the sound and music in its original form. To create awareness about the restoration of Karnan, a teaser trailer was launched on 21 February 2012, which received a positive response.

The restored version of Karnan which utilised DTS 5.1 surround sound, was released in 72 screens across Tamil Nadu, and was released by Shanthi's Divya Films. It was well received upon release, although M. Suganth called the restoration process "far from perfect", and Baradwaj Rangan wrote, "The print occasionally judders, leaving the impression of watching the movie on a screen mounted behind the driver's seat in an auto rickshaw". Taking a big opening, the film collected roughly ₹20 million (US$210,000) in Chennai within the first few weeks, and was later reported to have collected a total of ₹50 million (US$520,000). It had a theatrical run of over 100 days, and having surpassed what it originally managed to collect in its entire 105-day run at Shanthi theatre, the film was officially declared a commercial success. Its success soon established a trend of digitising and re-releasing films in Tamil cinema.

== Legacy ==
Karnan was considered a milestone in Tamil cinema as it brought together the then leading actors of South Indian cinema, Sivaji Ganesan and N. T. Rama Rao. Along with Ganesan's later film Thiruvilaiyadal (1965), it was responsible for a resurgence in Hindu mythological films, since it was released at a time when Tamil cinema primarily made films with contemporary settings. Actor Y. G. Mahendran said, "Karnan can never be remade. Nobody can replace any of the actors of the 1964 classic, and it would amount to mockery if it is done." Actor Rana Daggubati, in an interview with Sangeetha Devi Dundoo of The Hindu, said that Ganesan's performances as Kattabomman and Karna served as inspirations for his role in Baahubali: The Beginning (2015).

== Bibliography ==
- Arunachalam, M. (1981). Proceedings of the Fifth International Conference-Seminar of Tamil Studies. International Association of Tamil Research.
- Rajadhyaksha, Ashish; Willemen, Paul (1998) [1994]. Encyclopaedia of Indian Cinema. British Film Institute and Oxford University Press. ISBN 0-19-563579-5.
