= Lakshmana (Mahabharata) =

Son of Duryodhana in the Indian epic Mahabharata

Information
- Family: Duryodhana (father); Duryodhana's chief queen (mother); Lakshmanā (sister)
- Relatives: Dhritarashtra (grandfather); Gandhari (grandmother); Kauravas; Pandavas (half-uncles); Dushala(aunt)

Lakshmana (Sanskrit: लक्ष्मण, romanized: Lakṣmaṇa) was a son of Duryodhana, a prominent figure in the Hindu epic Mahabharata. He is described as a valiant warrior and a skilled archer. During the Kurukshetra War, Lakshmana was slain on the thirteenth day of the Kurukshetra War by Abhimanyu, who decapitates him using an arrow.

== Role in the Mahabharata ==
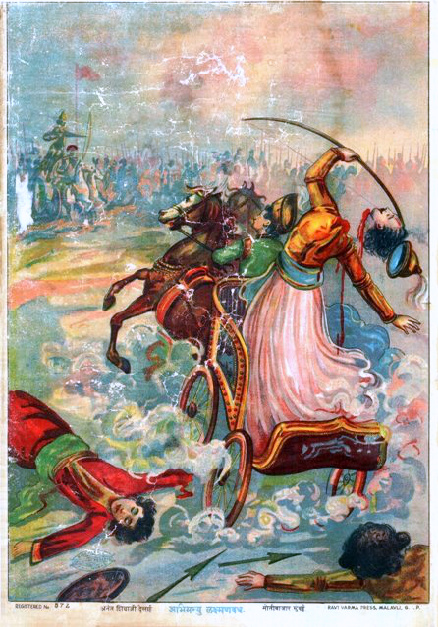
Abhimanyu beheads Lakshmana, print by Ravi Varma Press

The Mahabharata gives sparse information about Lakshmana, other than his participation in the Kurukshetra War between two rival cousin group—Pandavas and Kauravas. Lakshmana fought from the Kaurava side, supporting his father Duryodhana, the leader of the Kauravas. On the second day of the Kurukshetra War, a furious melee ensued between Lakshmana and Abhimanyu, the son of Pandava Arjuna. When Abhimanyu was on the cusp of victory, Duryodhana rushed to his son's aid.

On the twelfth day of the war, Lakshmana injured Kshatradeva, the son of warrior Shikhandi.

On the thirteenth day of the war, Lakshmana was stationed near his father, fighting his foes with great prowess. When Abhimanyu approached Lakshmana Kumara, the former was assailed with arrows on his arms and chest. Enraged, Abhimanyu employed a broad-headed arrow, which beheaded Lakshmana. In retaliation, Duryodhana rallied a number of powerful Kaurava warriors to attack Abhimanyu simultaneously, resulting in his death.

Following the conclusion of the war, the death of Lakshmana is mourned by his mother. When the sage Vyasa, through his yogic powers, facilitated a vision for Pandava and Kaurava matriarchs—Kunti and Gandhari respectively—to see the deceased warriors, Lakshmana was among those who appeared.

== In adaptive works ==
=== Sasirekha Parinayam ===
In a folktale called the Sasirekha Parinayam, a tale about Lakshmana's life prior to Kurukshetra War is narrated. Duryodhana's teacher, Balarama, arranged the marriage of his daughter Sasirekha (also called Vatsala) with Lakshmana. However, Krishna, Balarama's younger brother, sought to strengthen the ties of his own family with that of Arjuna. As part of a ploy, he invited his sister, Subhadra, and her son, Abhimanyu, to his house while the wedding preparations were underway. Abhimanyu and Sasirekha fell in love and subsequently eloped. This incident brought much shame to Balarama, and served to infuriate Duryodhana.

== See also ==
- Karna
- Abhimanyu
- Yuyutsu
