= Wives of Karna =

Wives of the Karna, a character in Hindu epic, Mahabharata

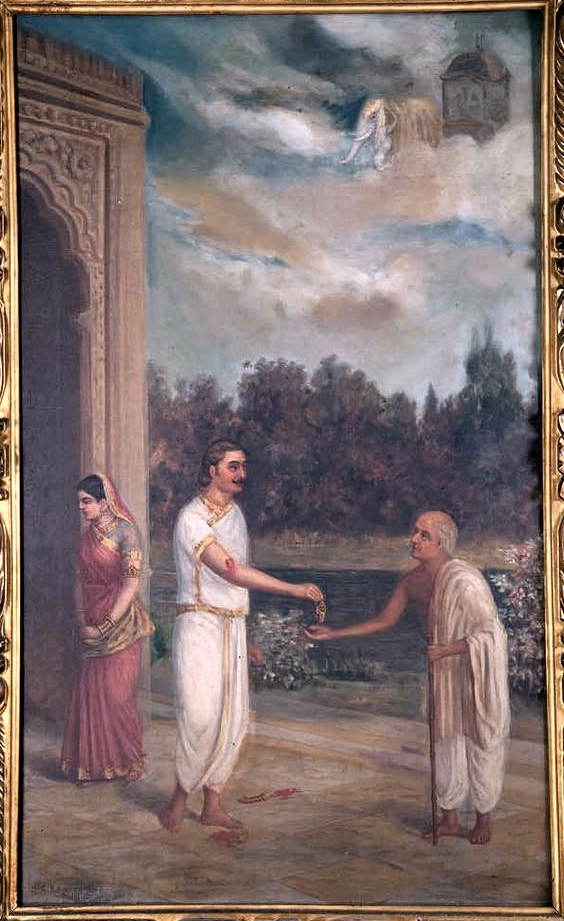
Karna (center) sacrifices his divine armour, while his wife watches in distress—a scene from the Mahabharata by Bamapada Banerjee

The Mahabharata provides limited information about the marital life of Karna, one of the central figures in the epic. His wives are not named in the canonical text and are described as belonging to the Sūta (charioteer) community. In the Stri Parva, one of his wives, revealed to be the mother of his sons Vrishasena and Sushena, is briefly mentioned lamenting over Karna's death.

Over time, various regional traditions and literary adaptations have invented narratives around Karna's marital life, often introducing named spouses through imaginative retellings. The Tamil play Karna Moksham depicts a princess named Ponnuruvi as his wife, while the Bengali retelling of the epic, Kashidasi Mahabharata, features a maiden named Padmavati as his queen. In modern literature, particularly in Shivaji Sawant’s Marathi novel Mrityunjay, Karna is portrayed as being married to two women—Vrushali and Supriya.

== In the Mahabharata ==
Karna's wives play insignificant roles in the original epic. In the Udyoga Parva of the Mahabharata, Karna—while explaining his commitment towards his foster parents—mentions them.

When also I attained to youth, I married wives according to his [Adhiratha] selections. Through them have been born my sons and grandsons, O Janardana. My heart also, O Krishna, and all the bonds of affection and love, are fixed on them.

— Karna, translated by Kisari Mohan Ganguli

In the Kurukshetra War, consumed by desperation, Karna pledges to give away his wives and children to anyone who can find Arjuna on the battlefield.

In the epic's Stri Parva, Gandhari, the mother of Duryodhana (antagonist of the Mahabharata), describes the grief of women after the Kurukshetra War. The sorrow of a wife of Karna is also described by her.

Behold, the wife of Karna and mother of Vrishasena, is indulging in piteous lamentations and crying and weeping and falling upon the ground! Even now she exclaims, "Without doubt, thy preceptor’s curse hath pursued thee! When the wheel of thy car was swallowed up by the Earth, the cruel Dhananjaya cut off thy head with an arrow! Alas, fie (on the heroism and skill)! That lady, the mother of Sushena, exceedingly afflicted and uttering cries of woe, is falling down, deprived of her senses, at the sight of the mighty-armed and brave Karna prostrated on the earth, with his waist still encircled with a belt of gold. Carnivorous creatures, feeding on the body of that illustrious hero, have reduced it to very small dimensions. The sight is not gladdening, like that of the moon on the fourteenth night of the dark fortnight. Falling down on the earth, the cheerless dame is rising up again. Burning with grief on account of the death of her son also, she cometh and smelleth the face of her lord!"

— Gandhari, translated by Kisari Mohan Ganguli

After the war, Yudhishthira honours Karna's wives.

P. Lal, a professor and translator of the Mahabharata, interprets three unnamed women as Karna wives, all belonging to the Sūta (charioteer) caste.

== In derivative literature ==
=== Ponnuruvi ===
Ponnuruvi is the wife of Karna in the Karna Moksham of Kattaikkuttu, a Tamil drama written by Pukalentippulavar. She plays a major role in it and is depicted as a princess belonging to Kshatriya (warrior) community. In the play, she is the princess of Kalinga and the story of her marriage is based on the Mahabharata's narration of the abduction of the Kalinga princess. Though the princess marries Duryodhana in the original epic, in these folklores, she is named Ponnuruvi and is married to Karna because he was the one who touched her during the abduction. Karna Moksham depicts her as abusive towards Karna as his lineage is not specified and she believes him to be of the lower caste. She doesn't even let Karna touch his son. However, when Karna discloses his true lineage before going to the Kurukshetra War, her attitude drastically changes and she apologizes. She advises Karna to not kill the Pandavas (Karna's half-brothers). She also advises him to leave the side of the Duryodhana. However, Karna refuses as he believes Duryodhana to be his true friend. After Karna dies in the war, Ponnuruvi laments his death.

=== Padmavati ===
In the Kashidasi Mahabharat (the Bengali retelling of the epic), Padmavati is attested as the wife of Karna. She was the maid of princess Asawari. They were rescued by Karna from some attackers. When Karna asks Asawari's father, the king, for her hand, the king rejected her marriage with Karna. Later, Karna attacked the kings at Asawari's swaymvara. Karna asked her if she would like to marry him. She says that she will do anything to save her father. Karna then accepts her maid Padmavati as his wife instead. Padmavati marries him and goes to Anga Kingdom with him.

=== Vrishali and Supriya ===
The characters Vṛṣālī and Supriyā, depicted as the wives of Karna, are literary creations introduced by author Shivaji Sawant in his Marathi novel Mrityunjaya. According to scholar Pradip Bhattacharya, the name "Vṛṣālī" appears to have been coined by Sawant, drawing a parallel with "Panchali", the heroine of the Mahabharata, while the name "Supriyā" resembles that of Subhadra, the wife of Arjuna—Karna's arch-rival.

In Mrityunjaya, Vrushali is portrayed as Karna's childhood companion and later his first wife, chosen by Adhiratha. She is described as wise, devout, and devoted to her husband. Following the deaths of Karna and their sons, she ends her life on his funeral pyre, symbolising her loyalty and grief.

Supriya is depicted as Karna’s second wife in the same novel. In the narrative, Supriya serves as the maid of Bhanumati, the princess of Kalinga. After Duryodhana abducts and marries Bhanumati with Karna’s assistance, he arranges Supriya’s marriage to Karna.

== Indonesian version ==
According to the Javanese puppet version, Karna's wife was named Surtikanti ( Javanese : ꦱꦸꦂꦠꦶꦏꦤ꧀ꦠꦶ , from Sanskrit: Śrutikāntī ), the daughter of Salya, the king of the Mandaraka kingdom. It is said that even though Karna served Duryodhana, he dared to kidnap the fiancée of Duryodhana, Surtikanti, daughter of Salya. The two were deeply involved in a romantic relationship. The person who was able to capture Karna was none other than Arjuna . The fight between the two was then broken up by Narada by telling the story of Karna's exile as a baby. Karna and Arjuna then together crushed the rebellion of Kalakarna, king of Awangga , a subordinate of Duryodhana. For his services, Duryodhana let Surtikanti become Karna's wife, and Karna was even appointed as King of Awangga replacing Kalakarna. From this marriage, two sons were born, Wresasena and Warsakusuma. After Karna died in the Bharatayuddha battlefield , Surtikanti committed suicide to follow her husband.
