= Vrishaketu =

Son of Karna in the epic Mahabharata

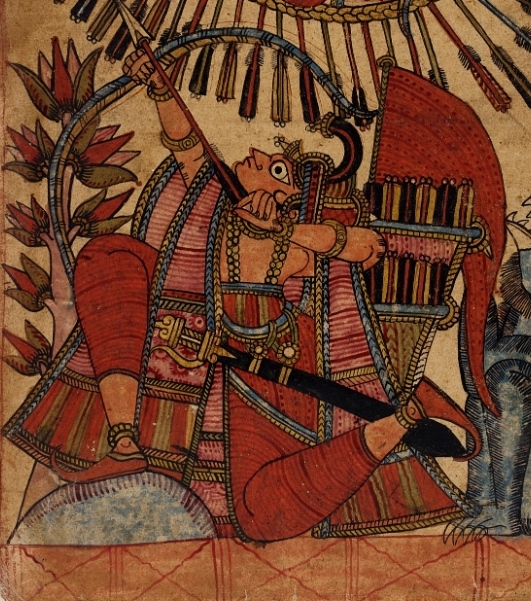
- Vrishaketu, the youngest son of Karna and Vruishali

Information
- Gender: Male
- Family: Karna (father) Sudama, Vrishasena, Chitrasena, Satyasena, Sushena, Shatrunjaya, Dvipata, Banasena, Susharma, Prasena (brothers); Pandavas (uncles); Daughter of Yavananta (wife)

Vrishaketu (Sanskrit: वृषकेतु, romanized: Vṛṣaketu) is the youngest son of Karna, a character in the Hindu Sanskrit epic Mahabharata. Most of his stories appear in regional adaptations of the Mahabharata, not in the epic itself.

== Legend ==
Vrishaketu was the youngest son of Karna. He was the only son of Karna to survive the Kurukshetra War. Once Karna's identity as the eldest son of Kunti was revealed, he was taken under the patronage of the Pandavas and received the kingdom of Anga. Before the ashvamedha yajna of Yudhishthira, he took part in Arjuna's battles against a number of kings. Vrishaketu was an active participant in Yudhishthira's ashvamedha yajna, capturing King Anushalva of the Chandravamsha dynasty.

== Bibliography ==
- Laura Gibbs, PhD. Modern Languages MLLL-4993. Indian Epics.
- Dowson's Classical Dictionary of Hindu Mythology
