= Usha Bachani =

Indian television actress

- Born: 1968 (age 57–58)
- Occupation: Television Actress
- Years active: 1994–present
- Spouse: Mahesh Anand (m. 2000; div. 2002)

Usha Bachani is an Indian television actress.

== Filmography ==
=== Films ===
Year	Film	Role
2000	Dulhan Hum Le Jayenge	Smuggler's Girlfriend
2000	Deewane	Vishal's Sister
2000	Raju Chacha	Preeti
2001	Naag Yoni	
2001	Gadar: Ek Prem Katha	
2003	Pyaar Kiya Nahin Jaatha	Anju
2004	Kaun Hai Jo Sapno Mein Aaya	Pramila Khanna
2005	Aankhon Mein Sapne Liye	
2005	Mashooka	
2005	Bobby: Love And Lust	Shalini
2006	Aatma	
2007	Life Mein Kabhie Kabhiee	Sarita S. Arora
2008	Fashion	Sheetal
2012	Ishaqzaade	A Prostitute

=== Television ===
Year	Serial	Role	Channel	Co–Star
1999	Suraag – The Clue	Bobby	DD National	
2001	Draupadi	Hidimba	Sahara One	Vindu Singh
2002	Lipstick	Shabnam	Zee TV	
2004	Pancham	Rukmini	Zee TV	
2005	Sinndoor Tere Naam Ka	Pamela	Zee TV	
2005	Sarabhai vs Sarabhai	Vidisha Mazumdar	Star One	
2006	CID – 60 Feet Underwater	Madhu (Episode 427)	Sony Entertainment Television	Govind Khatri
2008–2009	Mata Ki Chowki	Priyamvada Sabhya Kumar	Sahara One	Bharat Kaul
2009	Uttaran	Mrs. Jaylaxmi Khurana	Colors TV	
2014	Ekk Nayi Pehchaan	Meeta Manchanda	Sony Entertainment Television	
2015	Ek Veer Ki Ardaas...Veera	Manjeet Singh	Star Plus	
2017	Ek Tha Raja Ek Thi Rani	Anandi	Zee TV	
2017–2024	Kundali Bhagya	Kareena Luthra	Zee TV	
2026	Hui Gumm Yaadein Ek Doctor, Do Zindagiyaan	Aai Saheb	Sony SAB	
