= Gautam Rode =

Indian actor and television host

- Born: 14 August 1977 (age 49)
- Occupations: Actor; television host
- Years active: 2000– present
- Spouse: Pankhuri Awasthy Rode (m. 2018)
- Children: 2

Gautam Rode (born 14 August 1977) is an Indian actor known for his roles in Baa Bahoo Aur Baby, Lucky, Saraswatichandra, Suryaputra Karn, and Kaal Bhairav Rahasya 2.

== Early life ==
Rode was born on 14 August 1977. Earlier, Rode and his family used to stay in New Delhi, but later they moved to Mumbai. Rode's father, Surendra Rode is a retired broker and his mother, Sangeeta Rode is a jewellery designer. Rode did his schooling from Army Public School, Dhaula Kuan in Delhi. He was enrolled in Shaheed Bhagat Singh College, but took official sitting in Delhi College of Arts and Commerce.

== Career ==
Rode made his debut to Indian television with the show Jahan Pyaar Mile on Zee TV. In 2000, he played episodic roles in TV shows such as Rishtey, Apna Apna Style and Thriller at 10. In 2002, he made his debut to Bollywood with the film Annarth co-starred Sanjay Dutt, Sunil Shetty and Preeti Jhangiani. He played the role of Inspector Sameer Deshmukh in this film. Taran Adarsh of entertainment portal of Bollywood Hungama wrote of his performance, "Newcomer Gautam Rode has good screen presence and impresses as an actor. He does very well in stunts."

In 2005, he appeared in his second film, U, Bomsi & Me alongside Sonal Sehgal and Vivek Madan. He played the role of Sam Mac Patel a radio jockey who wants to be a writer and a famous one at that. Taran Adarsh wrote of his performance, "Gautam, who made his debut in ANNARTH [with Sanju, Suniel], has evolved as an actor. He is excellent in [emotional] sequences when his wife walks out on him." In 2005, he played his first noticeable role of television of Anish Kotak in Baa Bahu Aur Baby.

In the same year he also played his first lead role and the title role of Lucky in the show, Lucky. He later did supporting and cameo roles in shows which include Princess Dollie Aur Uska Magic Bag (2006), Betiyaan Apni Yaa Paraaya Dhan (2006), Ssshhhh...Koi Hai (2008), Simplly Sapney (2008), Rubi (2008), Babul Ka Aangann Chootey Na (2008). In 2009, Rode featured in the film Agyaat alongside Nithin and Priyanka Kothari. He played the role of Sharman Kapoor a completely self-obsessed man with no other concern except for his muscles and the leading lady, Aasha. Taran Adarsh wrote of his performance "Gautam Rode enacts the hot-headed superstar with conviction." Agyaat grossed ₹45.4 crore (US$4.7 million) domestically.

In 2010, he did supporting and cameo roles on television in the shows Mata Ki Chowki, Kashi – Ab Na Rahe Tera Kagaz Kora, Crime & Bollywood, Maan Rahe Tera Pitaah and Aahat. In 2010, he entered the show Mera Naam Karegi Roshan as Samvad, a guy who tries and spreads joy and cheers in everybody's life. In 2011, he entered the show, Parichay as Vineet Saxena. In 2012, he played an episodic role of Tarun in the show, Teri Meri Love Stories. In the same year, he hosted the reality dance show Nach Baliye 5 alongside Karan Wahi.

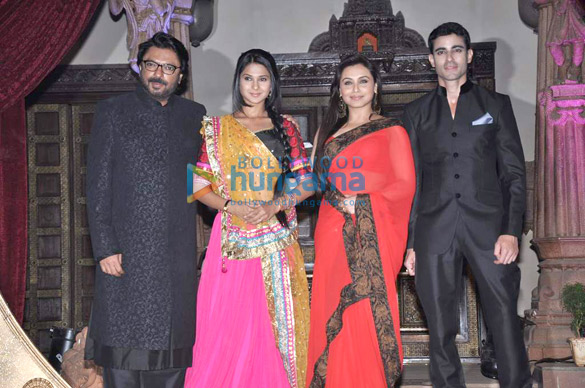
Rode at the Launch of serial ‘Saraswatichandra’

In 2013, he played the lead and title role in Sanjay Leela Bhansali's show, Saraswatichandra opposite Jennifer Winget. The show proved to be a turning point in his career giving him popularity and appreciation. In 2013, he also hosted Nach Baliye 6 alongside Karan Wahi. The show Saraswatichandra ended on 20 September 2014.

In 2015, he did another show, Maha Kumbh: Ek Rahasaya, Ek Kahani a mythological thriller. He played the role of Rudra in the show who is a "Garud", who has the duty of saving mankind. The show failed to impress the audience and ended in April 2015. In 2015, he entered the show Suryaputra Karn as the lead of the show, Karna. The show ended in July 2016. In August 2016, Rode signed Anant Mahadevan's Aksar 2 opposite Zarine Khan. The motion poster of the movie was released on 4 August 2017 on YouTube.

In 2018, Rode starred as Prince Veer in the Star Bharat's mystery thriller show Kaal Bhairav Rahasya Season 2 alongside Additi Gupta. From 2019 to 2020, he has been played Abhijeet in SAB TV's Bhakarwadi. In 2021, Rode played the role of Major Samar in the action thriller film State of Siege: Temple Attack, which was directed by Ken Ghosh and released on Zee5 on 9 July 2021. Later that year, Rode starred as Pawan Bisht in the MX Player original series Nakaab alongside Esha Gupta and Mallika Sherawat.

== Personal life ==
Rode lives in Mumbai. He married his co-actress Pankhuri Awasthy Rode on 5 February 2018 in Alwar. On 25 July 2023, Awasthy Rode gave birth to twins, a boy, Raditya and a girl, Radhya.

== Filmography ==
=== Films ===
Year	Title	Role	Ref(s)
2002	Annarth	Inspector Sameer Deshmukh	
2005	U, Bomsi & Me	Sam Mac Patel	
2009	Agyaat	Sharman Kapoor	
2017	Aksar 2	Patrick Sharma	
2021	State of Siege: Temple Attack	Major Samar	
2023	Bandra	Arjun Pandey	

=== Television ===
Year	Title	Role	Ref(s)	Notes
2000–2001	Apna Apna Style	Rocky		
2005–2007	Baa Bahoo Aur Baby	Anish Kotak		
2006–2007	Lucky	Lucky		
2006–2007	Betiyaan Apni Yaa Paraaya Dhan	Parth Jadeja		
2008–2009	Ssshhhh... Phir Koi Hai	Various characters		
2008	Simplly Sapney	Karan Mehra		
2008–2009	Babul Ka Aangann Chootey Na	Lakhan Malik		
2009–2010	Mata Ki Chowki	Aman		
2010	Aahat [Season 5]	Gautam		Episodes 49-64 "Game of Death"
2010	Kashi – Ab Na Rahe Tera Kagaz Kora	Shaurya		
2010	Maan Rahe Tera Pitaah	Rajveer		
2010–2011	Mera Naam Karegi Roshan	Samvad		
2011	India's Got Talent 3	Host		
2011	Parichay	Vineet Saxena		
2012	Teri Meri Love Stories	Tarun		
2012–2013	Nach Baliye 5	Host		
2013–2014	Saraswatichandra	Saraswatichandra "Saras" Vyas		
2013–2014	Nach Baliye 6	Host		
2014–2015	Maha Kumbh: Ek Rahasaya, Ek Kahani	Rudra		
2015–2016	Suryaputra Karn	Karna		
2018–2019	Kaal Bhairav Rahasya 2	Veervardhan "Veer" Singh		
2019–2020	Bhakarwadi	Abhijeet Annasaab Oagle		

=== Web series ===
Year	Title	Role	Notes
2021	Nakaab	Pawan Bisht	
2021	Jurm Aur Jaazbaat	Anchor	
2026	Maamla Legal Hai	Danish Chandani	Season 2
2026	Undekhi: The Final Battle	Vikram Sonuja	Season 4

=== Music videos ===
Year	Title	Singer(s)	Album	Ref(s)
2002	Kabhi Mausam Hua Resham	Abhijeet Bhattacharya	Tere Bina	
2002	Mujhe Kanhaiya Kaha Karo	Abhijeet Bhattacharya	Tere Bina	
2002	Chalne Lagi Hai Hawayein	Abhijeet Bhattacharya	Tere Bina	
2002	Kabhie Yaadon Mein	Abhijeet Bhattacharya	Tere Bina	
2002	Shukriya Shukriya Dard Jo Tumne Diya	Agam Kumar Nigam	Bewafaai	
2003	Kabhi Yaadon Mein Aaun	Abhijeet Bhattacharya		
2015	O Meri Jaan	Suhail Zargar		
2015	Kuttey	Dhrubajyoti Bhadury		
2018	Sunwai	Benny Dayal		
2021	Sun Le Zara	Saaj Bhatt, Sonal Pradhan		
2021	ChhanoMaano	Osman Mir		
2021	Devon Ke Dev Ganesha	Javed Ali		
2022	Thodi Si Nawazishein	Anuradha Juju		
2023	Mujhse Pehle	Saaj Bhatt		

== Awards and nominations ==
Year	Award	Category	Work	Result
2013	Zee Gold Awards	Most Fit Actor Male	Saraswatichandra	Won
2013	Zee Gold Awards	Best Actor Male	Saraswatichandra	Nominated
2013	Indian Television Academy Awards	Best Actor – Popular	Saraswatichandra	Nominated
2013	Indian Television Academy Awards	GR8! Performer Of The Year - Male	Saraswatichandra	Nominated
2014	Zee Gold Awards	Best Actor (Popular)	Saraswatichandra	Won
2014	Indian Telly Awards	Best Actor in a Lead Role Male	Saraswatichandra	Won
2014	Indian Telly Awards	Best Anchor (along with Karan Wahi)	Nach Baliye	Nominated
2014	Indian Television Academy Awards	Best Anchor	Nach Baliye	Nominated
2015	Television Style Awards	Best Costumes Drama - Male	Maha Kumbh: Ek Rahasaya, Ek Kahani	Won
2016	Indian Telly Awards	Best Actor - Popular	Suryaputra Karn	Won

== See also ==
- List of Indian television actors
