= Karna =

Warrior in the epic Mahabharata

- Mahabharata character
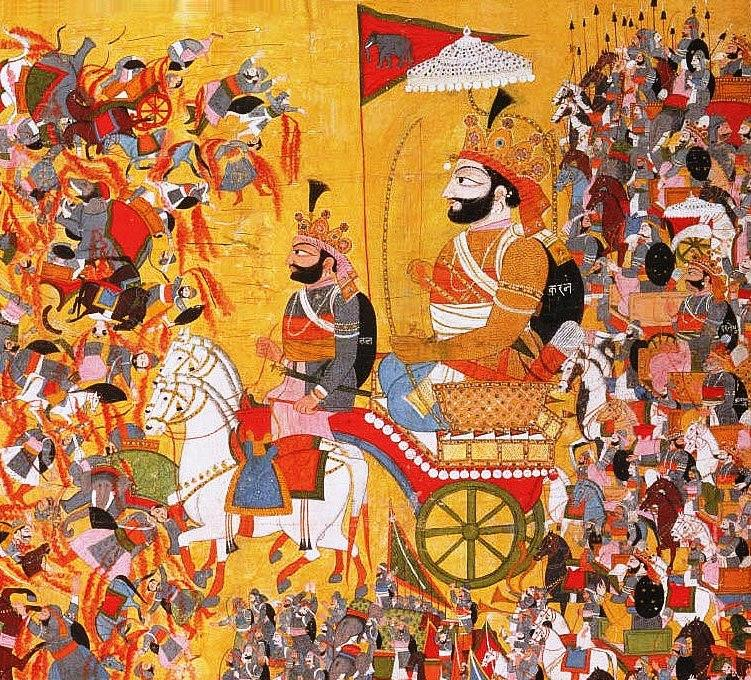
- Karna seated on a chariot during Kurukshetra War, Pahari painting, c. 1820

Information
- Aliases: Vasusena, Angaraja, Radheya
- Title: King of Anga
- Affiliation: Kauravas
- Weapon: Vijaya (bow) and arrows
- Family: Surya (father); Kunti (mother); Adhiratha (adoptive father); Radha (adoptive mother); Yudhishthira (half-brother); Bhima (half-brother); Arjuna (half-brother); Nakula (half-brother); Sahadeva (half-brother); Possibly some adoptive brothers
- Spouse: Unnamed Sūta women (Note: In the Mahabharata, Karna's marital life is hardly attested and his wives are unnamed. Karna's marital details vary across adaptations of the Mahabharata, with different works assigning him different wives, like Ponnuruvi, Padmavati, Vrushali, and Supriya.)
- Children: Vrishasena, Sushena, Vrishaketu and other sons
- Dynasty: Chandravamsha

Karna (Sanskrit: कर्णः, IAST: Karṇa), also known as Vasusena, Anga-Raja, Sutaputra and Radheya, is one of the major characters in the Hindu epic Mahābhārata. He is the son of Surya (the solar deity) and princess Kunti (later the Pandava mother). His birth occurred after Kunti invoked a divine boon to test its power in her youth; fearing societal stigma over her premarital motherhood, she is forced to abandon the infant in a basket on the Ganges. He is discovered and fostered by Radha and Adhiratha Nandana, the sūta (charioteer) of King Dhritarashtra. Karna grows up to be an accomplished warrior of extraordinary abilities, and a gifted speaker. He becomes a loyal friend of Duryodhana, and is appointed the king of Anga (Bihar-Bengal) by the prince. Karna joins the Kaurava side of the Kurukshetra War, and is ultimately slain by Arjuna.

He is a tragic hero in the Mahabharata, in a manner similar to Aristotle's literary category of "flawed good man". He meets his biological mother late in the epic then discovers that he is the older half-brother of those he is fighting against. Karna is a symbol of someone who is rejected by those who should love him but do not given the circumstances, yet becomes a man of exceptional abilities willing to give his love and life as a loyal friend. His character is developed in the epic to raise and discuss major emotional and dharma (duty, ethics, moral) dilemmas. His story has inspired many secondary works, poetry and dramatic plays in the Hindu arts tradition, both in India and in southeast Asia.

A regional tradition believes that Karna founded the city of Karnal, in contemporary Haryana.

== Nomenclature and epithets ==
Karṇa (कर्ण) is a word found in the Vedic literature, where it means "the ear", "chaff or husk of a grain" or the "helm or rudder". In another context, it refers to a spondee in Sanskrit prosody.

In the Mahabharata and the Puranas, it is the name of a warrior character. Called Vasusena as a child by his foster parents, he became known by the name Karna because of the golden earrings of Surya he used to wear, according to the Sanskrit epics scholar David Slavitt.

The word Karna, states the Indologist Kevin McGrath, signifies "eared, or the ear-ringed one". In section 3.290.5 of the Mahabharata, Karna is described as a baby born with the ear-rings and armoured breastplate, like his father Surya.

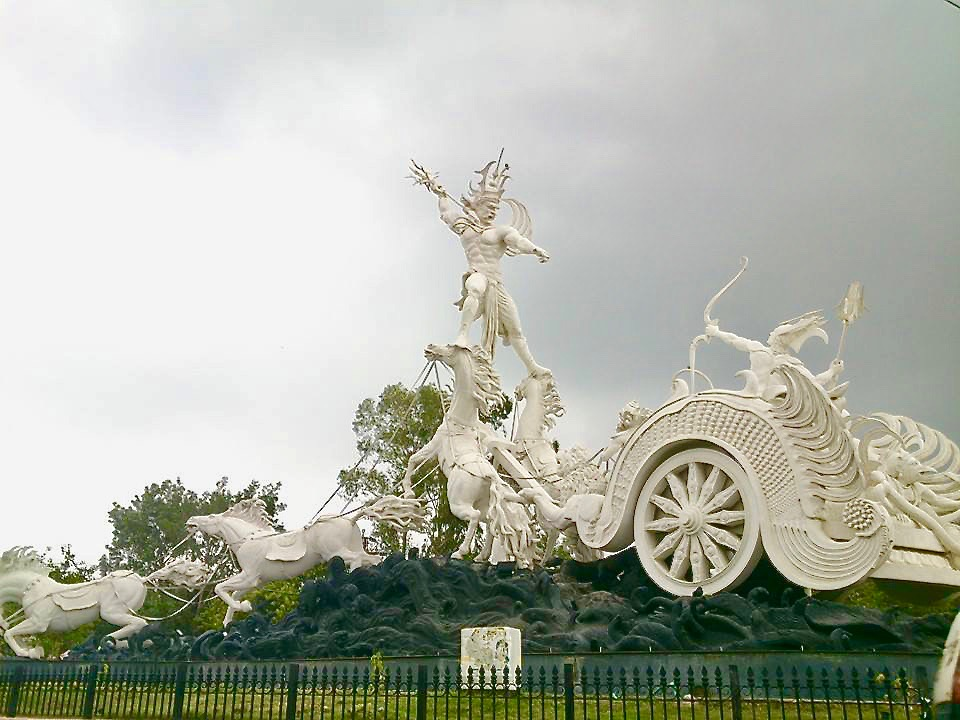
Karna inside the chariot fighting Ghatotkacha standing over horses, Kota, Rajasthan. This artwork – as Patung Satria Gatotkaca – is also found near the Denpasar airport, Bali, Indonesia.

The second meaning of Karna as "rudder and helm" is also an apt metaphor given Karna's role in steering the war in Book 8 of the epic, where the good Karna confronts the good Arjuna, one of the climax scenes wherein the Mahabharata authors repeatedly deploy the allegories of ocean and boat to embed layers of meanings in the poem. For example, his first entry into the Kurukshetra battlefield is presented as the Makara movement (an arrangement of soldiers in the sea-monster pattern). As Duryodhana's army crumbles each day, the sea and vessel metaphor repeatedly appears in the epic, particularly when Karna is mentioned. As a newborn, Karna's life begins in a basket without a rudder on a river, in circumstances that he neither chose nor had a say. In Book 1, again in the context of Karna, Duryodhana remarks, "the origins of heroes and rivers are indeed difficult to understand". (Note: The Karna legend in the Mahabharata is overlaid with metaphors such as "the worlds stand in water, every taste is made of water, all the world is made of water", later that "no one perceives this world sinking in a deep sea of time, where sharks of death and age awaits".)

The name Karna is also symbolically connected to the central aspect of Karna's character as the one who is intensely preoccupied with what others hear and think about him, about his fame, a weakness that others exploit to manipulate him. This "hearing" and "that which is heard", states McGrath makes "Karna" an apt name and subtle reminder of Karna's driving motivation. (Note: Surya, his father, tries to persuade him to not worry about what others think and avoid getting gullibly exploited, Karna declines.)

Karna was also called with many names. Some of them are:

- Vasusena – Original name of Karna, means "born with wealth" as he was born with natural armour and earrings.
- Suryaputra – Son of Surya
- Radheya – son of Radha (Karna's adopted mother).
- Sutaputra – son of charioteer.
- Angaraja – king of Anga.
- Daanaveera – one of charitable nature or one who is exceptionally munificent (generous)
- Vijayadhari – holder of a bow named Vijaya which was gifted by Lord Parashurama.
- Vaikartana – one who belongs to solar race (related to Surya).
- Vrisha – one who is truthful in speech and kept his vows.

== Mythology and sources: Mahābhārata ==
The story of Karna is told in the Mahābhārata, one of the Sanskrit epics from the Indian subcontinent. The work is written in Classical Sanskrit and is a composite work of revisions, editing and interpolations over many centuries. The oldest parts in the surviving version of the text probably date to about 400 BCE. Within Mahabharata, which follows the story within a story style of narration, the account of Karna's birth has been narrated four times.

Karna appears for the first time in the Mahabharata in the verse 1.1.65 of Adi Parvan (first book) where he is briefly mentioned through the metaphor of a tree, as someone who is refusing to fight or help in the capture of Krishna. He is presented again in sections 1.2.127–148, and chapter 1.57 of the Adi Parvan. It is here that his earrings "that make his face shine", as well as the divine breastplate (body armor) he was born with, are mentioned for the first time. This sets him apart as someone special, with gifts no ordinary mortal has. However, later in the epic, the generous Karna gives the "earrings and breastplate" away in charity, thereby becomes a mortal and later dies in a battle with Arjuna.

The story of his unmarried mother getting the child due to her curiosity, his divine connection to the Hindu god Surya, then his birth appears for the first time in the epic in section 1.104.7. The epic uses glowing words to describe Karna, but the presentation here is compressed in 21 shlokas unlike the later books which expand the details. These later sections with more details on Karna's birth and childhood include 3.287, 5.142 and 15.38. According to McGrath, the early presentation of Karna in the Mahabharata is such as if the poets expect the audience to already know the story and love the character of Karna. The text does not belabour the details about Karna in the early sections, rather uses metaphors and metonyms to colourfully remind the audience of the fabric of a character they already are assumed to be aware of. The complete narrative of his life appears for the first time in chapter 1.125.

=== Manuscripts, many versions ===
The Mahabharata manuscripts exist in numerous versions, wherein the specifics and details of major characters and episodes vary, often significantly. Except for the sections containing the Bhagavad Gita which is remarkably consistent between the numerous manuscripts, the rest of the epic exists in many versions. The differences between the Northern and Southern recensions are particularly significant, with the Southern manuscripts more profuse and longer. The legends of Karna too appear in many versions, including some versions that have no support in surviving manuscripts. The manuscripts found in the North and South India for the Karna parvan book have "great divergence" in details, though the thematic essence is similar. Scholars have attempted to construct a critical edition, relying mostly on a study of the Bombay edition, the Poona edition, the Calcutta edition and the south Indian editions of the Mahabharata manuscripts. The most accepted version is one prepared by scholars led by Vishnu Sukthankar at the Bhandarkar Oriental Research Institute, preserved at the Kyoto University, the Cambridge University and various Indian universities.

== Biography ==
=== Birth and early life ===
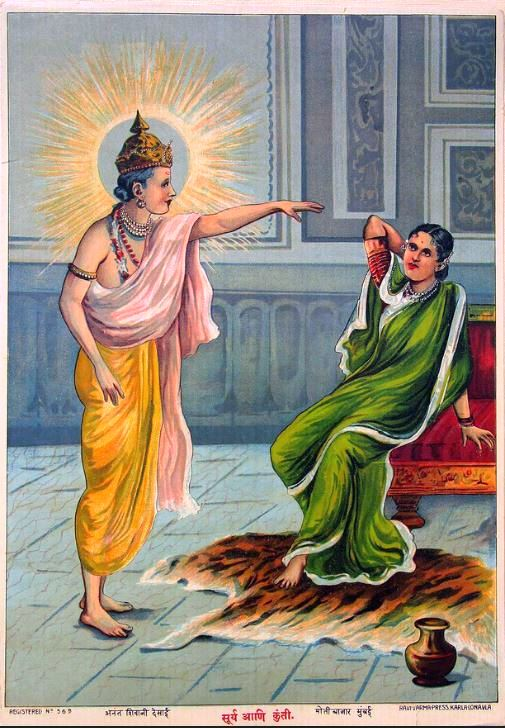
Surya gives boon to Kunti

According to the legend, there was a king of the Yadava dynasty named Shurasena who had a beautiful young daughter named Pritha (later Kunti). A rishi (Vedic scholar and seer) named Durvasa visited the king for a lengthy stay and was housed as his palace guest. Shurasena asked Pritha to ensure that Durvasa's stay was comfortable. On leaving, having been delighted with his stay and her diligent services, Durvasa thanked her and gave her the Siddha mantra, telling her that if she ever wants, she can invoke any deity to give her a child. (Note: She used the same mantra later in the Mahabharata, after Kunti is unable to have any children with her human husband, and he agrees to her using the mantra to have children. Kunti calls on god Dharma to have son Yudhishthira, then god Vayu to have Bhima and finally Indra to have Arjuna.)

Teenage Pritha became curious, wondered if the mantra would really work and, as the sun rose one morning, she initiated the mantra through which she could invoke any divine God being to provide her a son. She called the sun god Surya. He came with a golden glow, dressed up in jewellery and breastplate, and provided her with her first son. (Note: This story appears in various forms, with different level of details in many sections of the Mahabharata. A detailed version, for example, is found in sections 3.290–291 of the critical edition. The Sun-God gave her a child that came from her ear, and therefore the child was known as Karṇa.) Pritha felt confused and ashamed, worried what everyone will think and how she will embarrass her family. At that time, according to Vedic civilization, if a girl gave birth to a child before her marriage, she would be less likely to be married. So, she put the newborn baby in a padded basket, and set it adrift in the small river Ashvanadi by the palace.

Later Kunti got blessed with children Yudhishtra, Bhima, and Arjuna, using this mantra. The same mantra was used by Kunti to allow her co-wife, Madri, to conceive Nakula and Sahdeva. The Spiritual "fathers" of the five Pandavas were Dharma, Vayu, Indra and the twin Ashwini Kumaras.

As the adolescent mother abandons her unwanted child on the river, she laments and the epic verses describe her emotions with heartbreaking poetry, according to the Indologist Patricia Greer.

The basket floats, reaches the river Charmanwati, which carries it to the Yamuna River. The basket floats on and reaches the Ganges River and on it into the kingdom of Anga (ancient Bengal). There, it is found by a charioteer's wife Radha, who takes the baby Karna to her husband Adhiratha Nandana. They adopt him right away and name him Vasushena. They love him and raise him just like their own son. While he was growing up, his adopting parents let Karna know that they had found and adopted him. This knowledge affects Karna, he feels ashamed that he was abandoned, and this frames his sense of self-identity through the epic.

Karna attends school in Hastinapura, where he studies martial arts under the sages Drona and Kripa. When Drona declines to teach him the knowledge of the Brahmastra weapon, Karna disguises himself as a Brahmin to become a student of Parashurama, an incarnation of the god Vishnu. Upon discovering Karna's deception, Parashurama curses him, declaring that he will forget the secret of the Brahmastra at the critical moment when he wishes to use it against his enemy.

The third Pandava prince Arjuna was Karna's peer and equal. At school and in episodes where his character appears, he is repeatedly rejected, subjected to ridicule and bullied for being the son of a poor family, and particularly for his low birth. The boy Karna came to be known for his solitary habits, hard work, pious yoga before Surya every day, compassion and eager generosity to help anyone in need particularly Brahmins, his gift of speech, and for the pursuit of excellence in whatever he did. Karna is also known as someone who craves for respect, love and attention, who is overly sensitive to criticism, who habitually brags about his skills and martial capabilities, yet is deeply thoughtful and dharmic in critical moments of the epic.

=== Relationship with Duryodhana ===
Karna meets Duryodhana for the first time in Hastinapura during archery lessons from Drona, an event described in section 3.293 of the Mahabharata. They become close friends not long after, when Karna and Arjuna are at a weapons trial competition. Duryodhana sees in Karna a man who is an equal of Arjuna in martial abilities, and someone to befriend to balance out Arjuna and thereby "diminish the Pandavas".

Before the competition starts, the contestants must announce theirs lineage so that men of equal ranks are placed together. After Arjuna announces his royal lineage, it is time for Karna to present his lineage. If Karna were to announce his charioteer lineage, it would disqualify him from competing against Arjuna. Duryodhana steps in and says Karna is an Arajna (a non-king, but also a word play on Arjuna) but announces that he is offering to anoint Karna as the king of Angas (Bengal). Once Karna is a king, states Duryodhana, Arjuna would not have the excuse to avoid Karna and not compete with the able warrior. Karna accepts the anointment, becomes a king that day. It also transforms him into a loyal friend to Duryodhana, with an eagerness to reciprocate the favour. Karna asks Duryodhana what he would want in return for the kingdom he just gave out of his empire, Duryodhana replies, "I want your endless friendship Karna".

For the consecration ceremony, Karna's father arrives. Bhima, one of the Pandavas, ridicules him for his low status and calls him dog-like. The public insult of his father makes Karna hate the Pandavas. At the end of the competition, while everyone rejects Karna, Duryodhana expresses amity to Karna by "taking Karna by his hand". Karna feels Duryodhana is that friend who stood by him when everyone rejected him. Duryodhana becomes Karna's lifelong close friend. In Karna, Duryodhana finds an able man and talented commander who can help him gain and retain power over an empire. In Duryodhana, Karna finds a caring friend and resourceful supporter when almost everyone is bent on ridiculing and disowning him.

Karna evolves into a character who shares Duryodhana's view that Pandavas are bad and enemies, though for different reasons. Karna participates with Duryodhana in schemes to effect the downfall of the Pandavas. Duryodhana provides the goals, Karna conspires the means to get there.

In the final year of the exile of the Pandavas, Duryodhana plans to sow dissension and keep the entire empire to himself. In contrast, Bhisma and Drona suggest a conciliation and dividing the kingdom into two, half for Kauravas and other for Pandavas. Karna, in contrast, adopts the hawkish approach and becomes the first to suggest a direct confrontation in the form of the Kurukshetra war. He calls for "together we should slay the Pandavas" as the final solution. Karna persistently recommends violence and an all-out war, to settle things once and for all, by good brave warriors. Karna also accuses Bhisma and Drona as covetous materialists and dishonest in counselling Duryodhana with non-violent strategies. Duryodhana has evil intentions and is a bad king, but it is Karna who fuels Duryodhana's ambitions and fights his battles.

With Duryodhana, Karna is a key participant in insulting the Pandavas and Draupadi. He humiliates the Pandavas with his gift of speech and mocks Draupadi, then calls her a "whore" and asks Duhshasana to strip her off her clothes. It is Karna's language and insults that hurt the Pandavas and Draupadi the most, a sentiment that is noted in numerous verses of the Mahabharata such as 3.13.113 and 5.93.11. Yet, states the Mahabharata scholar Alf Hiltebeitel, "remarkably, Karna regrets his harsh words to Draupadi and Pandavas", in verse 5.139.45, where he confesses he spoke so to please Duryodhana.

=== Conquests and defeats ===
Karna is portrayed in the Mahabharata as a skilled and valiant warrior, achieving several notable victories. One of his key successes was his defeat of Jarasandha, the powerful king of Magadha, during the swayamvara of the princess of Kalinga. Despite Jarasandha’s strength and reputation, Karna prevailed and, as a mark of respect, was gifted the territory of Malini by the defeated ruler. Additionally, Karna played a critical role during Duryodhana’s military campaigns, successfully defeating various kings like Drupada and Bhaggadatta and expanding the Kaurava domain.

Karna also faced significant defeats that revealed his limitations. During the campaign against Drupada, launched as Gurudakshina for Drona, Karna and the Kauravas were unable to overcome Drupada’s forces. It was Arjuna who ultimately succeeded in capturing Drupada. Another notable loss occurred during the Pandavas’ Rajasuya Yajna, when Karna refused an alliance with Bhima, leading to a direct confrontation. Although Karna resisted fiercely, Bhima ultimately defeated him, with Karna’s divine armor (Kavacha) and earrings (Kundala) preventing his death. In the Gandharva episode during the Pandavas' exile, Karna fled from battle after Kauravas were captured by Chitrasena, the Gandharva king, after being defeated in battle.

=== Hostilities with the Pandavas ===
The relationship between Karna and the Pandavas, particularly Arjuna, were hostile. The Mahabharata mentions Karna as the main challenger of Arjuna at sporting and skills competitions. At martial sporting events, Arjuna and Karna were often equal, though in his self-bragging style Karna once announced, states McGrath, that "he will perform any feat that Arjuna has accomplished and do it better".

At the svayamvara competition of Draupadi, where she is expected to choose her husband, both Arjuna and Karna are present. Arjuna and his brothers, however, are disguised as mendicant Brahmins. They use this false identity in exile because Duryodhana had attempted to kill them using various schemes, including burning the lacquer house – custom built for the Pandavas by Duryodhana – along with the forest while they were sleeping. There are some variations regarding Karna's participation. Some renditions show Draupadi refusing to marry Karna on account of being a Sūta, while some other versions describe him failing to string the bow by the "breadth of a hair". In the end, Arjuna succeeds in the task, However Karna objects that the competition is only meant for Kshatriyas, and Brahmins such as "the mendicant who just strung the bow" should not be competing for the hand of Draupadi, a Kshatriya bride. Duryodhana supports him. The gathered Kshatriyas too angrily support Karna, for they against the mixing of varna (here, Brahmin-Kshatriya marriage). Arjuna maintains his calm, continues to hide his true identity, insists that he is a "Brahmin who fight". Arjuna's accomplishments and calmness win Draupadi's heart. Draupadi picks Arjuna and awards the garland to him, signify that she chooses to marry the disguised-Brahmin Arjuna. (Note: This story appears in many versions in different manuscripts and later secondary literature. In some versions, such as one published by Ramesh Chandra Dutt, Draupadi openly rejects Karna because he is the son of a charioteer (suta), something that angers Karna. In another version, found in South Indian texts, Krishna takes the form of a rat and severs the string and thereby prevents Karna from equaling Arjuna's feat. However, all such versions are relatively modern, and according to McGrath who quotes Vishnu Suthankar, appear in "late and inferior or conflated manuscripts". The older critical edition version shows Karna simply failed, just like he and his army ultimately fails in other battles against the Pandavas. For another version of this story in a non-critical edition of the epic, see the summary by Moriz Winternitz.) (Note: According to the Indologist and Mahabharata scholar Mehendale, the story that Draupadi rejected Karna for being a son of "Suta" "does not occur at all in the entire Southern recension, and among the versions of the Northern recension, it does not occur in the Kashmiri, Maithili and Bengali versions". Further, even in Nepali and Devanagari Northern manuscript versions where it is found, it occurs only in a minority of them. It has therefore not been included in the critical edition of the epic that is deemed to more accurately reflect the original.) The varna-based discrimination and verbal insults on Arjuna, for lovely Draupadi's hand, one that Karna initiates at the time of Draupadi's svayamvara competition comes back to haunt him many times through angry Bhima and others who remind Karna that he is merely a suta-putra (son of a charioteer). Draupadi too never likes Karna thereafter.

Karna fights and berates the Pandavas at the legendary gambling match during the royal consecration ritual. There, Karna uses the choicest words to insult Draupadi that takes the bitterness of Pandava for Karna to much more emotional level from what previously was a dispute about respective martial prowess. These are the sections of the epic when the Pandavas, Arjuna in particular, openly pledge to kill Karna. Karna retaliates with words too, stating that Arjuna's death is so near that he will "not wash his feet until Arjuna is slain".

Karna is not proud of his anger and outbursts. Later, in a quieter moment with Krishna such as in section 5.139.45, and to his lifelong friend Duryodhana in section 8.1.7, Karna confides he was wrong in insulting Draupadi and the Pandavas, it is his past karma that haunts him and is a source of his private suffering.

=== Discovery of his biological mother ===
Book 5 of the Mahabharata describes two meetings where Karna discovers information about his birth. The first meeting is with Krishna, the second where his biological mother Kunti comes to meet him for the first time.

Krishna approaches Karna as an ambassador seeking to prevent violence and the war. Krishna starts by complimenting Karna for knowing "the Vedas and the subtlety of the dharmasastras". He then requests his support to end the cascading cycle of violence and war. Krishna tells Karna that Kunti is his biological mother and Pandavas are his half-brothers. In section 5.138 of the epic, according to McGrath, Krishna states, "by law, Karna should be considered as the eldest born of Pandavas", that he can use this information to become the king. Through his relationship to his mother Kunti, all Vrishnis on Krishna's side will also recognize him and be his tributary, he can be the emperor with power over everyone. Yudhisthira will hold the fan for him as he sits in the throne, Bhima his umbrella, and the common wife of the Pandavas – Draupadi too – says Krishna, may marry to him. (Note: Draupadi is the common wife of all five Pandava brothers, including Arjuna. Krishna's suggestion is that if Karna were to declare himself as the sixth Pandava brother, Draupadi would, in time, consider him as her sixth husband.) after some time, were Karna to press his status as the eldest biological Pandava brother, end the war and rule the world.

Karna declines the offer. Karna replies that though he was born from Kunti, it was the wife of a charioteer "Radha who gave him love and sustenance", and that makes her his real mother. Similarly, it is from the love and affection and "not scripture" that he knows Adhiratha to be his real father. He is already married, says Karna, he has two sons and now grandsons, all because his father Adhiratha helped him settle into his married life. What matters most in life are the "bonds of love", according to Karna, and not power over the world. He shall betray no one, remain loyal to those who love him, including his friend Duryodhana, with whom he has been in allegiance for thirteen years. It is not "blood ties" that matter, but how someone treats you over a period of time that does. He made a promise to Duryodhana and he will keep it. It is his duty to fight Arjuna.

Krishna then went to Kunti and asked her to meet Karna and tell him that he is her first born son and the Pandavas were his brothers. Krishna left it to her to choose between Karna and her five other sons. Kunti then went to meet Karna, finds him praying. She waits. After he finished his prayers to Surya, Karna meets Kunti for the first time in his adult life. He greets her (he now already knows her to be his biological mother). With folded hands, he introduces himself as the son of Radha and Adhiratha, and inquires about the purpose of her visit. Kunti then confesses that he is her firstborn. Surya also appears and confirms Kunti's story, and suggests that he follow her. Karna says that though he may have been the firstborn, he never received the affection or care from her as the firstborn. "You discarded me", says Karna to Kunti, "you destroyed me in a way that no enemy could ever do to him". It is too late. He reiterates that he loves the parents who raised him, they love him, and he will remain loyal to his lifelong relationships. No one should abandon those who give respect and affection, says Karna in these Mahabharata verses. The war momentum shall continue and he aims to kill Arjuna. Karna promised to Kunti that he will not kill any of his other four half-brothers, but either "Arjuna or I" shall die and she can still say she has five sons just as she did all her life.

After these developments and pondering on Karna's life choices, the divine Krishna, as well as a host of Mahabharata heroes, in private and after his death, honour Karna as a satpurusha (lit. "a true, honest, good man") and "the best among those who understand and uphold the dharma".

=== Role in Kurukshetra War ===
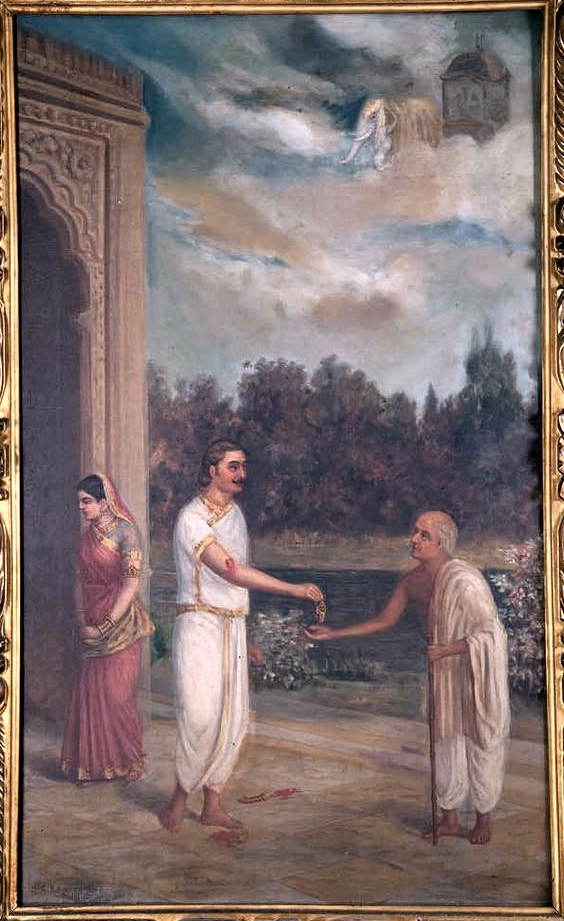
Karna offering an old poor man, bent with age and destitution, a Kavacha that is embedded in his arms and is retrieved by culling with a knife

Karna was born with aspects of his divine father Surya – the earrings and armour breastplate – that made him an immortal at birth. However, despite being warned, Karna prefers to lose these natural gifts in order to uphold his reputation as the one who always gives dāna (charity), particularly to Brahmins, as being more important than his own life.

As the battle-to-death between Karna and Arjuna becomes certain, Kunti – the mother of both, faints and later weeps in sorrow that her boys are bent on killing each other. In parallel, Arjuna's brothers and Indra – the father of Arjuna and a major Vedic deity – plan ways to make Karna mortal. Surya meets Karna and warns him of Indra's plan to appear disguised as a Brahmin to divest him of his earrings and breastplate, and thereby his immortality. Karna disregards this warning and says that if the king of gods Indra comes to beg before him, and if he charitably gives to Indra, it will bring him "renown and fame", then argues that "fame is more important to him than anything else". Indra appears as predicted, and Karna cuts his birthmarks of immortality with a knife, and gives the blood-soaked donation to disguised-as-a-Brahmin Indra. The leader of gods in return praises him and gives him a missile that can only be used once and will kill any mortal or immortal.

Karna keeps the Indra's missile in reserve since it could only be used once, and aims to kill Arjuna with it. By the thirteenth day of the Mahabharata war, numerous soldiers, kings, brothers and sons of Kauravas (Karna's side) and Pandavas (Arjuna's side) had been killed, many by foul means. The war had entered a brutal stage, according to the Mahabharata verses in sections 7.150–156. On the fourteenth day, Arjuna took revenge of his own son's death, while Bhima and his son Ghatotkacha wreaked havoc on numerous Kaurava battalions. The war that previously started after sunrise and stopped at sunset, did not stop on the fourteenth day's sunset as both armies continued a ferocious war to kill each other. Bhima's son Ghatotkacha had a rakshasha lineage, and his powers of illusion to confuse the enemies grew to enormous proportions as the war dragged deeper into the fifteenth night. Duryodhana and Karna's Kaurava friends plead that they are finished unless Karna does whatever it takes to kill Ghatotkacha. Karna hurls the "Indra missile" to kill Ghatotkacha. Karna thus saves his reputation among his soldiers, launches the missile and kills Ghatotkacha. Duryodhana and Kaurava army rejoice with the death of Bhima's son Ghatotkacha, but now Karna had exhausted the weapon that gave him an advantage over Arjuna.

=== Death ===
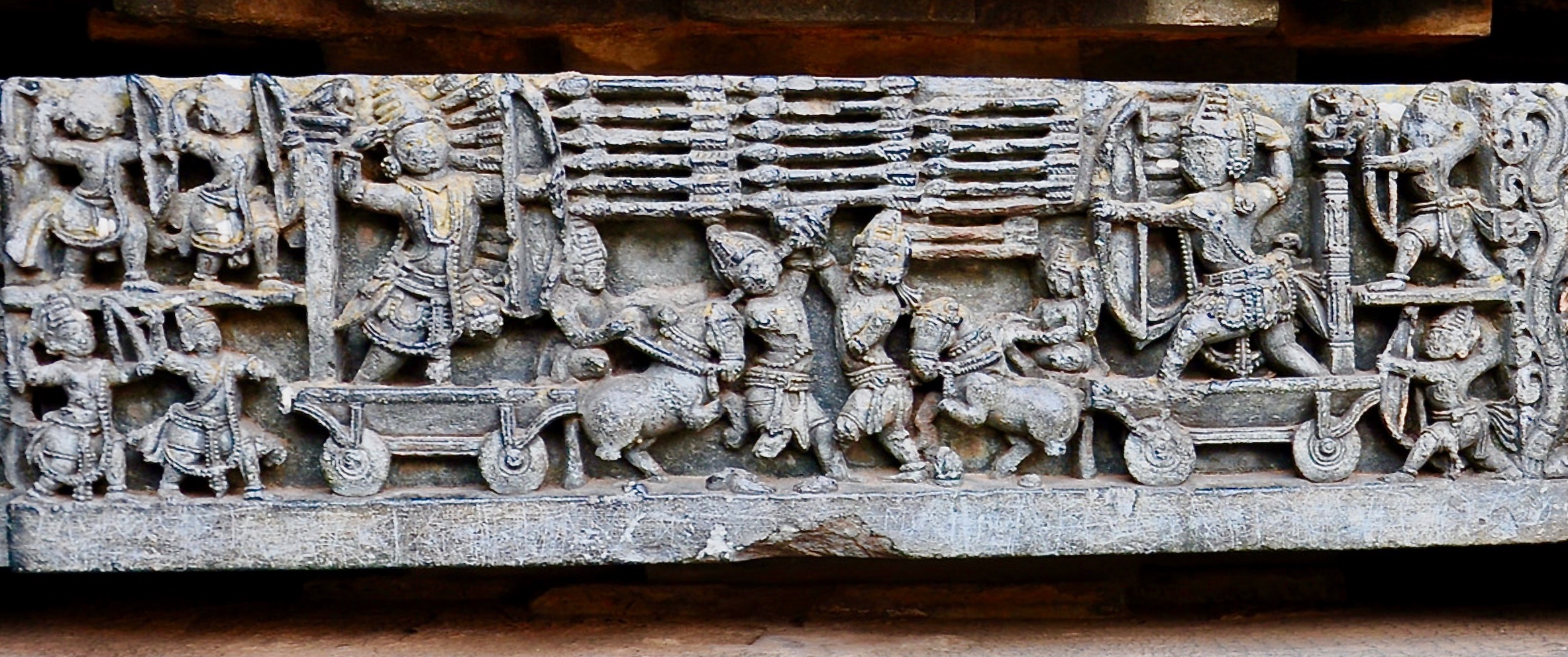
The Karna-Arjuna final battle scene is a relief included in Mahabharata panels in many historic Hindu temples in India and in southeast Asia such as at the Angkor Wat. Above is the scene at the 12th-century Hoysaleswara Temple, Karnataka. (Note: For a discussion of the Angkor Wat reliefs related to the Mahabharata, see Silva-Vigier and Simson.)

As the second last day of the war and Karna's day of death dawns, Karna asks Duryodhana to convince king Shalya to be his charioteer since he plans to kill Arjuna that day. The South Indian king considers it below his dignity to be a mere charioteer and starts insulting Karna, who retaliates with words. Duryodhana intervenes, praises both, presses Shalya to guide the chariot for the critical battle. Ultimately Shalya agrees. Since all previous commanders of Duryodhana had been killed, he anoints Karna as the senapati (commander of all his forces) for the first time. Karna and Shalya head into the battlefield together, though they keep insulting each other's abilities and intent, lack mutual devotion and teamwork. Together they reach Arjuna with Krishna. They battle that day, each showing his martial skills of attack as well as his ability to neutralize all weapons that reach their chariot.

The sources characterize this duel as the most "overdetermined" event in the epic, as Karna is ensnared by a "skein of fatalities" including a Brahmin’s curse that the earth would swallow his wheel at a moment of peril and Rama Jamadagnya’s curse that he would forget his most powerful weapons when needed most. As the fight begins, the heroes' divine fathers, Indra and Surya, lead hosts of celestials in declaring their preferences, though Arjuna's victory is divinely certain. Krishna acts as a "ringmaster," goading events toward a divine master plan and using his "yoga power" to protect Arjuna from Karna’s legendary snake arrow by sinking the chariot into the earth five finger-breadths so the shaft strikes only Arjuna's diadem instead of his neck.

Then, the wheel of Karna's chariot gets stuck in the ground as the Brahmin's curse takes effect. Karna steps out of his chariot and is distracted while trying to unstick it. He appeals to Arjuna’s sense of kshatriya dharma, arguing that heroes do not attack those who are distressed or unarmed. Krishna rebuts this with scathing irony, reminding Karna of his past failures to uphold righteousness during the humiliation of Draupadi and the poisoning of Bhima. Arjuna, whose own son was killed by the Kauravas a day ago while he was trying to unstick his chariot's wheel, takes this moment to launch the fatal attack. He decapitates Karna using the Anjalika weapon a choice derived from the gesture of salutation (anjali), symbolizing a final tragic greeting between brothers who were inherently friends. Karna dies. (Note: The verses in sections 8.66–67 of the epic provide more details. For example, when the wheel gets stuck, Karna demands that Arjuna wait and fight the battle per the dharma code (rules of a "just war"). However, Arjuna reminds Karna about the time Karna did not consider the dharma code when he abused and called for an assault on the helpless Draupadi by asking Dushasana to publicly disrobe her. Arjuna refuses Karna's request, claiming Karna should not be using double standards for others and for himself.)

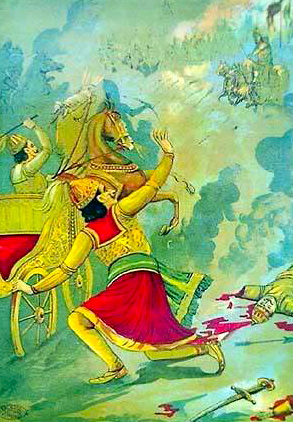
Death of Karna

=== Marital life ===
The Mahabharata provides scarce information on Karna's marital life. In the Udyoga Parva, it is mentioned that he married a Suta woman chosen by Adhiratha. She is later referenced in the Stri Parva as the mother of Vrishasena and Sushena, the two most prominent sons of Karna. Marital details of Karna's life are expanded and reimagined in later adaptations of the Mahabharata.

In the modern day version of the Mahabharata, nine sons of Karna are mentioned—Vrishasena, Chitrasena, Satyasena, Sushena, Shatrunjaya, Dvipata, Banasena, Prasena and Vrishaketu.

== Themes and symbolism ==
=== Vedic and Indo-European parallelism ===
The Karna-Arjuna story has parallels in the Vedic literature and may have emerged from these more ancient themes. According to McGrath, the Vedic mythology is loaded with the legendary and symbolism-filled conflict between Surya (sun) and Indra (clouds, thunder, rain). Indra cripples Surya in the Vedic mythology by detaching his wheel, while Arjuna kills Karna while he tries to fix the wheel that is stuck in the ground. As another example of parallels, Surya too has a birth mother (Night) who abandons him in the Vedic texts and he too considers his adoptive mother (Dawn) who raises him to his bright self as the true mother just like Karna. This idea was first discussed by the philologist Georges Dumézil, who remarked that similar mythology and details are found in other ancient Indo-European stories.

Karna resembles various famous characters found in Hindu texts. The attributed author of Mahabharata, the sage Vyasa, was also born from an unwed union of Satyavati and sage Parashara. German Indologist Georg von Simson states that Karna of the Mahabharata resembles Kumbhakarna of the Ramayana, the demon brother of the main antagonist Ravana of the epic Ramayana in their powers to sway the war. Both Karna and Kumbhakarna did not take part in the great wars of their respective epics at the start.

Scholars internationally have also drawn parallels with various European mythologies. Karna's kavacha (breastplate armour) has been compared with that of Achilles's Styx-coated body and with Irish warrior Ferdiad's skin that could not be pierced. He has been compared to the Greek mythological part divine, part human character Achilles on various occasions as they both have divine powers but lack corresponding status.

=== Dharma-ethics ===
Dharma is a complex concept in the Indian religions. It is not an atomistic or compartmentalized concept, rather incorporates "ways of living, ways of seeing and ways of relating to life's ultimate issues", according to Matilal. Of those issues, ones relating to right or wrong behaviour, duties, rights, and expectations from others are the domain of dharma-ethics. Karna's story raises the dharma-ethics questions both while Karna acts in the epic as well as after his death. These questions arise with the circumstances related to his birth and through his death. Karna chooses loyalty to his lifelong friend and "good policy based on his heart" to be of higher value than accepting Krishna's recommendation that he switch sides and become the king as the eldest son of Kunti based on dharmasastras. According to Gurcharan Das, the character of Karna in the ancient Hindu epic suggests a social debate between "inherited status" and "deserved status", a debate that remains relevant to the contemporary times. Das writes,

Karna, like the other heroes in the Mahabharata, forces us to look at ourselves and at our frailties. When Karna is not allowed to train in weaponry because he is a suta, it makes one ask, ’What if my child had been denied entry into college because of her birth?’ [...] We want them [our children] to feel secure and confident about their position. We want them to be treated with respect as equals. The Mahabharata is not content simply to point out the weaknesses of human beings. It criticizes society's flaws. It raises the question whether a person's social position should be defined by birth or by some other criterion, such as accomplishment of some sort. [...] Karna challenges their traditional understanding of dharma – as inherited status – and offers a new notion of dharma as deserved status.
Karna has to be 'the wrong person in the wrong place' – this is what Karna symbolizes to many minds today. Life may have been unfair to Karna but he rises above pity. Despite his flaws we admire him.

— Gurcharan Das, The Difficulty of Being Good: On the Subtle Art of Dharma (abridged)

=== Circumstances and subjective morality ===
As the Karna story unfolds, similar to other stories in epic, it raises moral dilemmas. With each dilemma, the Mahabharata presents various sides and shades of answers through the characters. According to Bimal Matilal, the characters face a "choice between irreconcilable obligations", between two good or two poor choices, where complex circumstances must be considered. These circumstances make the evaluation of the choices complicated and a decision difficult, subjective. When circumstances lead to a conflict between two choices that are both right in their own premises, then following one duty becomes "contrary to the duty according to the other". Under these circumstances, there is an inherent subjective weighing of one moral duty against another.

According to the Mahabharata, human conflicts such as those illustrated through Karna-Arjuna conflict are inherently complicated and come with circumstantial depth. During violence and war, where all sides are motivated in part by their own beliefs in what constitutes righteousness, coupled with anger, frustration, and fear, the circumstances are ever more complex, actions irreversible, choices difficult. The choices made by Karna and his opponents must then be reflected upon both in terms of the circumstances and the mesh of multiple relative goods or bads, by characters each with different combinations of human strengths and weaknesses.

According to the Indologist Adam Bowles, while the Hindu Arthashastra text presents an objective analysis of situations, its dharmasutras, dharmasastras and the epics attempt to deal with the more complex, subjective scenarios of life. The dharma, according to the Mahabharata and as Karna's story illustrates, is sukshma (subtle) and subjective to circumstances. According to Julian Woods, these stories suggest that the difficulty is not really between "dharma and adharma", but rather "conflict between different dharmas". No act, states Woods, on this earth "is wholly good or wholly bad".

=== Human behaviour ===
Karna and other characters in the Mahabharata, like all human beings, combine a spectrum of good and bad behaviour, intentions and deeds. According to Das, all of the epic's characters including Karna do good deeds, foul deeds, and they are "ineradicable mixture of good and evil". With the assistance of Karna, Duryodhana plotted many evil plans against the Pandavas. Similarly, the Pandavas use foul means in an attempt to win a war, and Arjuna sets aside the Hindu behavioural code for "just war" when Karna becomes defenceless and distracted by his chariot's stuck wheel.

According to the Mahabharata scholar Sukthankur, as quoted by Indologist Adarkar, there are apparent contradictions in Karna's character. His behaviour reflects a "frustration complex" that makes sense in light of the circumstances of his birth and early life. Karna is a mirror with "insights into human nature" and how circumstances have the ability to shape human behaviour and one's personality. Karna is not evil, just a misfit or a rebel, an inspiring character if viewed from one set of values and an abnormal character from another set of values. Other characters in the epic, on both sides, present behaviour conflicted hues of human behaviour in difficult circumstances. Karna is cruel in some situations such as against Draupadi, a behaviour he himself regrets in the pages of the Mahabharata. To the victim Draupadi, it was a violence she would never forget nor live with, and Karna's personal regrets did not balance out her sexual humiliation in public. The reader and epic's audience can empathize with his psychology, as well as the psychology and the counter-behaviour of his victims.

According to Adarkar, the Karna story also illustrates a different paradigm, one that transcends the Oedipal theories and evolutionary models of human behaviour. The Karna narrative resonates deeply with some in part because of his "heroic steadfastness" (dhirata), being comfortable with who he is, his beliefs and acting according to his dharma rather than being someone who evolves and changes as he studies martial arts, or because of Krishna's advice, or Kunti's confession that Karna is her firstborn. He refuses to wear "Emperor's New Clothes", states Adarkar, and thus "being revealed as a fraud" and ever-adapting to new psychological garb. He loves the parents who adopted him, he loves his friends and heritage. Karna exemplifies a personality that does not "discard identity after identity, but rather one who thrives by accepting and steadfastly hanging on to a meaningful identity". A more modern era example of Karna-like human behaviour was in Mahatma Gandhi, who "after getting well-educated in a British law school and gaining international experience", steadfastly felt more empowered to embrace his heritage and culture rather than abandon or transcend it.

=== Flawed, tragic hero ===
Karna is the flawed tragic hero of the Mahabharata. He is martially adept and equal to Arjuna as a warrior, a gifted speaker who embeds provocative insults for his opponents in front of an audience. He does the right thing (dharma) yet is cruel and mean (adharma). He never questions the ethics of his lifelong friend Duryodhana rather conspires and abets in Duryodhana's quest for power through the abuse of his opponents. He complains of "dharma failed him" on the day of his death, yet in his abuse of Draupadi, he himself ignores the dharma. He is a victim of his circumstances beyond his choosing, as much as the cause of circumstances that victimize other flawed heroes of the epic. His life story raises compassion, sorrow with an impending sense of destruction and fear (phobos and eleos) in the audience, as any good tragic drama. According to the Indologist Daniel Ingalls, the Karna character refutes the "bon mot that Indian poets knew no tragedy" before the colonial British introduced European literature to the Indians. Ingalls suggests Karna and many Rajput ballads are clearly tragedies in both the Aristotelian sense outlined in Poetics and the Elizabethan sense.

According to Julian Woods, Karna is a "tragic antihero" of the epic. He is both generous to the Brahmins yet arrogant and cruel to the Pandavas. He bitterly opposes the Pandavas and is the pillar of support to the Kauravas, yet as he nears his fatal battle, he is also willing to accept his mistakes and recognize the good in Yudhisthira and the Pandavas he opposes.

== Secondary literature ==
The Karna story has been retold and adapted into drama, plays and dance performances in India and southeast Asia. These versions vary significantly from each other as well as the Mahabharata manuscript.

=== Literature ===
Rabindranath Tagore wrote a poem, "Karna Kunti Sangbad" based on the meeting of Karna and Kunti before the war. Karna also has been topic of various contemporary literary works. The Marathi books of Radheya (1973) authored by Ranjit Desai and Mrityunjay (1967) authored by Shivaji Sawant bring forth a fictionalized account of Karna's private and personal life. Sawant also received Moortidevi Award, instituted by Bharatiya Jnanpith, for his work and was translated into nine languages. Ramdhari Singh Dinkar in 1978 published an epic poem Rashmirathi (translation: One who rides the Chariot of light, 1952) which narrates Karna's life. The poem has later also been adapted as a play.

== In popular culture ==
- Shyam Benegal's 1981 film Kalyug adapted the Mahabharat as a conflict between rival business houses with Shashi Kapoor playing Karan, the character based on Karna.
- Rajinikanth played a character based on Karna in the 1991 Kollywood film Thalapathi. The theme of the film is based on the friendship between Karna and Duryodhana.
- Ajay Devgan played a character based on Karna in the 2010 Bollywood film Raajneeti.
- South Indian film actor Mohanlal performed Karna on the stage in Karnabharam, a Sanskrit play that was premiered in New Delhi in 2001 as part of the Bharat Rang Mahotsav directed by Kavalam Narayana Panicker. The play depicts Karna's mental agony a day before the Kurukshetra War, as he thinks about his past and his faith.
- Bala Devi Chandrashekar plays the character of Karna in the 2015 Bharatanatyam production Karna – Destiny's Child.

=== Film and television ===
| Year | Name | Played by | Channel |
|---|---|---|---|
| 1922 | Karna | Shree Nath Patankar | N/A |
| 1964 | Karnan | Sivaji Ganesan | N/A |
| 1977 | Daana Veera Soora Karna | N. T. Rama Rao | N/A |
| 1977 | Kurukshetram | Krishnam Raju | N/A |
| 1988 | Mahabharat | Pankaj Dheer | DD National |
| 1988 | Mahabharat | Harendra Paintal | DD National |
| 1989 | The Mahabharata | Jeffrey Kissoon | N/A |
| 1989 | The Mahabharata | Lou Bihler | N/A |
| 1993 | Shri Krishna | Govind Khatri | DD Metro |
| 1997 | Ek Aur Mahabharat | Samar Jai Singh | Zee TV |
| 1997 | Mahabharat Katha | Pankaj Dheer | DD National |
| 1997 | Jai Hanuman | Praphulla Pandey | DD Metro |
| 2001 | Draupadi | Shahbaz Khan | Sahara One |
| 2002 | Maharathi Karna | Praphulla Pandey | DD National |
| 2008 | Kahaani Hamaaray Mahaabhaarat Ki | Hiten Tejwani | 9X |
| 2013 | Mahabharat | Aham Sharma | STAR Plus |
| 2013 | Mahabharat | Vidyut Xavier | STAR Plus |
| 2013 | Mahabharat | Gananay Shukla | STAR Plus |
| 2013 | Mahabharat | Anil Kapoor (voice) | N/A |
| 2014 | Dharmakshetra | Aarya DharmChand Kumar | Epic |
| 2015 | Suryaputra Karn | Gautam Rode | Sony Entertainment Television |
| 2015 | Suryaputra Karn | Vishesh Bansal | Sony Entertainment Television |
| 2015 | Suryaputra Karn | Vasant Bhatt | Sony Entertainment Television |
| 2018 | Karn Sangini | Aashim Gulati | STAR Plus |
| 2019 | Kurukshetra | Arjun Sarja | N/A |
| 2024 | Kalki 2898 AD | Prabhas | N/A |

== Bibliography ==
- Adarkar, Aditya (2008). "Psychological Growth and Heroic Steadfastness in the Mahābhārata". In Sherma, Rita; Sharma, Arvind (eds.). Hermeneutics and Hindu Thought: Toward a Fusion of Horizons. Springer Netherlands. pp. 121–150. doi:10.1007/978-1-4020-8192-7_7. ISBN 978-1-4020-8191-0.
- Adarkar, Aditya (2005). T. S. Rukmani (ed.). The Mahabharata: What Is Not Here Is Nowhere Else. Munshiram Manoharlal. ISBN 978-8-1215-1130-8.
- Adarkar, Aditya (2001). Karna in the Mahabharata. University of Chicago Press. OCLC 255075356.
- Allen, Nicholas (1999). Bronkhorst, Johannes; Deshpande, Madhav (eds.). Aryan and non-Aryan in South Asia. Harvard University Press. ISBN 978-1-888789-04-1.
- Bharne, Vinayak; Krusche, Krupali (2014). Rediscovering the Hindu Temple: The Sacred Architecture and Urbanism of India. Cambridge Scholars Publishing. ISBN 978-1-4438-6734-4.
- Bhattacharya, Abheda Nanda (1992). Dharma-Adharma and Morality in Mahābhārata. S.S. Publishers. ISBN 978-81-85396-05-7.
- Bhattacharya, Pradip (2006). "Reviewed Work: The Sanskrit Hero: Karṇa in Epic Mahābhārata by Kevin McGrath". International Journal of Hindu Studies. 10 (3). Springer. JSTOR 20106984.
- Bowles, Adam (2006). Mahabharata: Karna, Volume 1. New York University Press. ISBN 978-0-8147-9981-9.
- Bowles, Adam (2008). Mahabharata: Karna, Volume 2. New York University Press. ISBN 978-0-8147-9995-6.
- Bowles, Adam (2007). Dharma, Disorder, and the Political in Ancient India: The Āpaddharmaparvan of the Mahābhārata. BRILL Academic. ISBN 978-90-04-15815-3.
- Brockington, J. L. (1998). The Sanskrit Epics. Brill Academic. ISBN 90-04-10260-4.
- de Bruin, Hanne M.; Brakel-Papenyzen, Clara (1992). "The Death of Karna: Two Sides of a Story". Asian Theatre Journal. 9 (1). University of Hawai'i Press: 38. doi:10.2307/1124249. ISSN 0742-5457. JSTOR 1124249.
- Bryant, Edwin F. (2007). Krishna in the Mahabharata: The death of Karna, in Krishna: A Sourcebook. Oxford University Press. ISBN 978-0-19-972431-4.
- van Buitenen, J. A. B.; Fitzgerald, James L. (1973). The Mahabharata, Volume 1: Book 1: The Book of the Beginning. University of Chicago Press. ISBN 978-0-226-84663-7.
- van Buitenen, J. A. B.; Fitzgerald, James L. (1975). The Mahabharata, Volume 2: Book 2, The Book of Assembly; Book 3: The Book of the Forest. University of Chicago Press. ISBN 978-0-226-84664-4.
- Chakravarti, Bishnupada (2007). Penguin Companion to the Mahabharata. Penguin Books. ISBN 978-93-5214-170-8.
- Coulter, Charles Russell; Turner, Patricia (2013). Encyclopedia of Ancient Deities. Routledge. ISBN 978-1-135-96390-3.
- Dalal, Roshen (2010). Hinduism: An Alphabetical Guide. Penguin Books. ISBN 978-0-14-341421-6.
- Das, Gurcharan (2010). The Difficulty of Being Good: On the Subtle Art of Dharma. Oxford University Press. ISBN 978-0-19-977960-4.
- Donaldson, Thomas E. (1987). Kamadeva's Pleasure Garden: Orissa. Advent. ISBN 978-81-7018-393-8.
- Falk, Nancy (1977). "Draupadi and the Dharma". In Gross, Rita M. (ed.). Beyond Androcentrism: New Essays on Women and Religion. Scholars Press. ISBN 978-0-89130-196-7.
- Greer, Patricia M. (2002). Karna Within the Net of the Mahabharata. University of Virginia Press. OCLC 1049048537.
- Hiltebeitel, Alf (2001). Rethinking the Mahabharata: A Reader's Guide to the Education of the Dharma King. University of Chicago Press. ISBN 978-0-226-34053-1.
- Hiltebeitel, Alf (2011). Dharma: Its Early History in Law, Religion, and Narrative. Oxford University Press. ISBN 978-0-19-987524-5.
- Ingalls, Daniel H. H. (1965). An anthology of Sanskrit court poetry: Vidyākara's "Subhāsiaratnakosa". Harvard University Press. ISBN 9780674039506.
- Johnson, W. J. (2009). "Karna". A Dictionary of Hinduism. Oxford University Press. doi:10.1093/acref/9780198610250.001.0001. ISBN 978-0-19-861025-0.
- Johnson, W. J. (1998). The Sauptikaparvan of the Mahabharata: The Massacre at Night. Oxford University Press. ISBN 978-0-19-282361-8.
- Klostermaier, Klaus K. (1998). A concise encyclopedia of Hinduism. Oxford Oneworld. ISBN 978-1-85168-175-4.
- Lemming, David (2005). "Karna". The Oxford Companion to World Mythology. Oxford University Press. doi:10.1093/acref/9780195156690.001.0001. ISBN 978-0-19-515669-0.
- Manikutty, Sankaran (2012). "Why Should I Be Ethical? Some Answers from Mahabharata". Journal of Human Values. 18 (1). SAGE Publications: 19–32. doi:10.1177/097168581101800103. S2CID 145704002.
- Matilal, Bimal Krishna (2002). Ganeri, Janordon (ed.). Ethics and Epics: The Collected Essays of Bimal Krishna Matilal. Oxford University Press. ISBN 978-0-19-565511-7.
- McGrath, Kevin (2004). The Sanskrit Hero: Karna in Epic Mahābhārata. Brill Academic. ISBN 90-04-13729-7.
- Mehendale, M. A. (2001). "Interpolations in the Mahabharata". Annals of the Bhandarkar Oriental Research Institute. 82 (1/4). Bhandarkar Oriental Research Institute: 193–212. JSTOR 41694638.
- Miller, Barbara Stoler (1985). "Karnabhara: The trial of Karna". Journal of South Asian Literature. 20 (1). Asian Studies Center, Michigan State University: 47–56. JSTOR 40872709.
- Nandy, Ashis (2008). A Very Popular Exile. Oxford University Press. ISBN 978-0-19-569322-5.
- Sharma, Arvind (2007). Essays on the Mahābhārata. Motilal Banarsidass. ISBN 978-81-208-2738-7.
- Shulman, David Dean (2014). The King and the Clown in South Indian Myth and Poetry. Princeton University Press. ISBN 978-1-4008-5775-3.
- de Silva-Vigier, Anil; von Simson, Otto Georg (1964). "The Battle of the Mahabharata: Stone reliefs from the Temple of Angkor Vat, Cambodia 1113–1150". Man Through His Art: War and Peace. New York Graphic Society.
- Slavitt, David (2015). Mahabharata. Northwestern University Press. ISBN 978-0-8101-3060-9.
- Terrence, John Thomas (1995). "The Death of Karna". Theatre Journal. 47 (1): 134. doi:10.2307/3208814. JSTOR 3208814.
- Trikha, Pradeep (2006). Textuality and Inter-textuality in the Mahabharata: Myth, Meaning and Metamorphosis. Sarup & Sons. ISBN 978-81-7625-691-9.
- Valmiki; Vyasa (19 May 2018). Delphi Collected Sanskrit Epics (Illustrated). Delphi Classics. ISBN 978-1-78656-128-2.
- Winternitz, Maurice (1996). A History of Indian Literature, Volume 1. Motilal Banarsidass Publication. ISBN 81-208-0264-0.
- Woods, Julian F. (2014). Destiny and Human Initiative in the Mahabharata. State University of New York Press. ISBN 978-0-7914-9058-7.
- Zarrilli, Phillip B. (2002). "Reviewed Works: Kattaikkuttu: The Flexibility of a South Indian Theatre Tradition by Hanne M. de Bruin; Karna's Death: A Play by Pukalentirrulavar by Pukalentirrulavar, Hanne M. de Bruin". Asian Theatre Journal. 19 (1). University of Hawai'i Press. doi:10.1353/atj.2002.0020. JSTOR 1124427. S2CID 161376487.
