= Wives of Duryodhana =

Wife of Duryodhana, an antagonist of the epic Mahabharata

In the Hindu epic Mahabharata, Duryodhana—the principal antagonist—is married to several princesses, though the epic provides little detail about them, not even mentioning any name. The mother of his son Lakshmana appears in prominence, who in her brief appearance in the Stri Parva, mourns the death of her husband Duryodhana and her son. Elsewhere, in the Shanti Parva, his marriage with an unnamed princess of Kalinga—daughter of King Chitrangada—is narrated, whom Duryodhana abducted from her svayamvara (a self-choice ceremony for selecting a husband), with the assistance of his close friend Karna. In the Bhishma Parva, a princess of Kashi Kingdom is mentioned as his bride.

The number of Duryodhana's wives is not clearly specified. Some variations of the Mahabharata introduce additional details about Duryodhana's wives. In the Southern Recension and Gita Press translation of the epic, it is mentioned that his chief wife is the princess of Kashi, the daughter of King Kashiraja, who is noted for welcoming Draupadi when she first arrives in Hastinapura.

Because of the sparse information about Duryodhana’s wives in the Mahabharata, later playwrights and storytellers expanded on their stories. In the play Urubhanga by Bhasa (c 200-300 CE), Duryodhana is depicted as having two wives—Malavi and Pauravi. The Venisamhara, a Sanskrit play by Bhatta Narayana (c. 11th century), was the first to introduce Bhanumati as Duryodhana's wife, in which she is the sole wife of Duryodhana. This version has since gained popularity and Bhanumati is often assumed to be Duryodhana’s wife in popular tradition.

== Contextual Background: Duryodhana and the Mahabharata ==
Duryodhana is a central character in the Mahābhārata. The Mahābhārata (c. 400 BCE - 400 CE) is one of the two major Sanskrit epics of ancient India, traditionally attributed to Vyasa. Comprising approximately 100,000 verses, it is the longest epic poem in world literature. The epic primarily deals with the succession conflict between the Pandavas and the Kauravas, whom Duryodhana leads, culminating in the great war of Kurukshetra.

The text has multiple recensions, broadly categorized into the Northern Recension and the Southern Recension. These versions differ in length, theological content, and certain narrative elements, with the Southern Recension often including additional devotional aspects.

To establish a standardized version, the Critical Edition (CE) was compiled at the Bhandarkar Oriental Research Institute, Pune, under the guidance of Vishnu S. Sukthankar. Completed in 1966, the CE collates nearly 1,259 manuscripts to reconstruct the core text while identifying later interpolations.

== In the Mahabharata ==
In the Mahabharata, Duryodhana, the eldest Kaurava prince, is described as having multiple wives, though the epic does not elaborate on most of them. During the Ghosha Yatra episode, Duryodhana embarks on a cattle inspection expedition near Dwaitavana intending to mock the exiled Pandavas, accompanied by his brothers, ministers, soldiers, and their wives. The wives, though unnamed, partake in this royal outing, showing their opulence and grandeur of the Kuru household. However, Duryodhana, is captured along with his wives by Gandharvas. Arjuna and the Pandavas intervene and rescue Duryodhana, his brothers, and their wives.

In most parvas (books) of the epic (in all recensions), Duryodhana's chief wife is referred to as Lakṣmaṇamātā—mother of Duryodhana's son, Lakshmana—and her identity remains ambiguous. During the Kurukshetra War, she is referred to by Duryodhana in a moment of lament after his defeat. In Shalya Parva, Section 64, as he lies mortally wounded on the battlefield, Duryodhana expresses deep anguish over the fate of his grieving wife, saying, “Without doubt, the beautiful and large-eyed mother of Lakshmana, made sonless and husbandless, will soon meet with her death!”

The most notable mention of Duryodhana's wife occur in the Stri Parva, where Gandhari, Duryodhana’s mother, grieves over the death of her son and grandson Lakshmana. She describes her daughter-in-law in vivid detail while addressing Krishna:

Behold, again, this sight that is more painful than the death of my son, the sight of these fair ladies weeping by the side of the slain heroes! Behold, O Krishna, the mother of Lakshmana, that lady of large hips, with her tresses dishevelled, that dear spouse of Duryodhana, resembling a sacrificial altar of gold. Without a doubt, this damsel of great intelligence, while her mighty-armed lord was formerly alive, used to sport within the embrace of her lord's handsome arms! Why, indeed, does not this heart of mine break into a hundred fragments at the sight of my son and grandson slain in battle? Alas, that faultless lady now smells (the head of) her son covered with blood. Now, again, that lady of fair thighs is gently rubbing Duryodhana's body with her fair hand. At one time she is sorrowing for her lord and at another for her son. At one time she looketh on her lord, at another on her son. Behold, O Madhava, striking her head with her hands, she falls upon the breast of her heroic spouse, the king of the Kurus. Possessed of complexion like that of the filaments of the lotus, she still looketh beautiful like a lotus. The unfortunate princess now rubbeth the face of her son and now that of her lord.

— Gandhari, Translated by Kisari Mohan Ganguli

=== Kalinga Princess ===
Princess of Kalinga
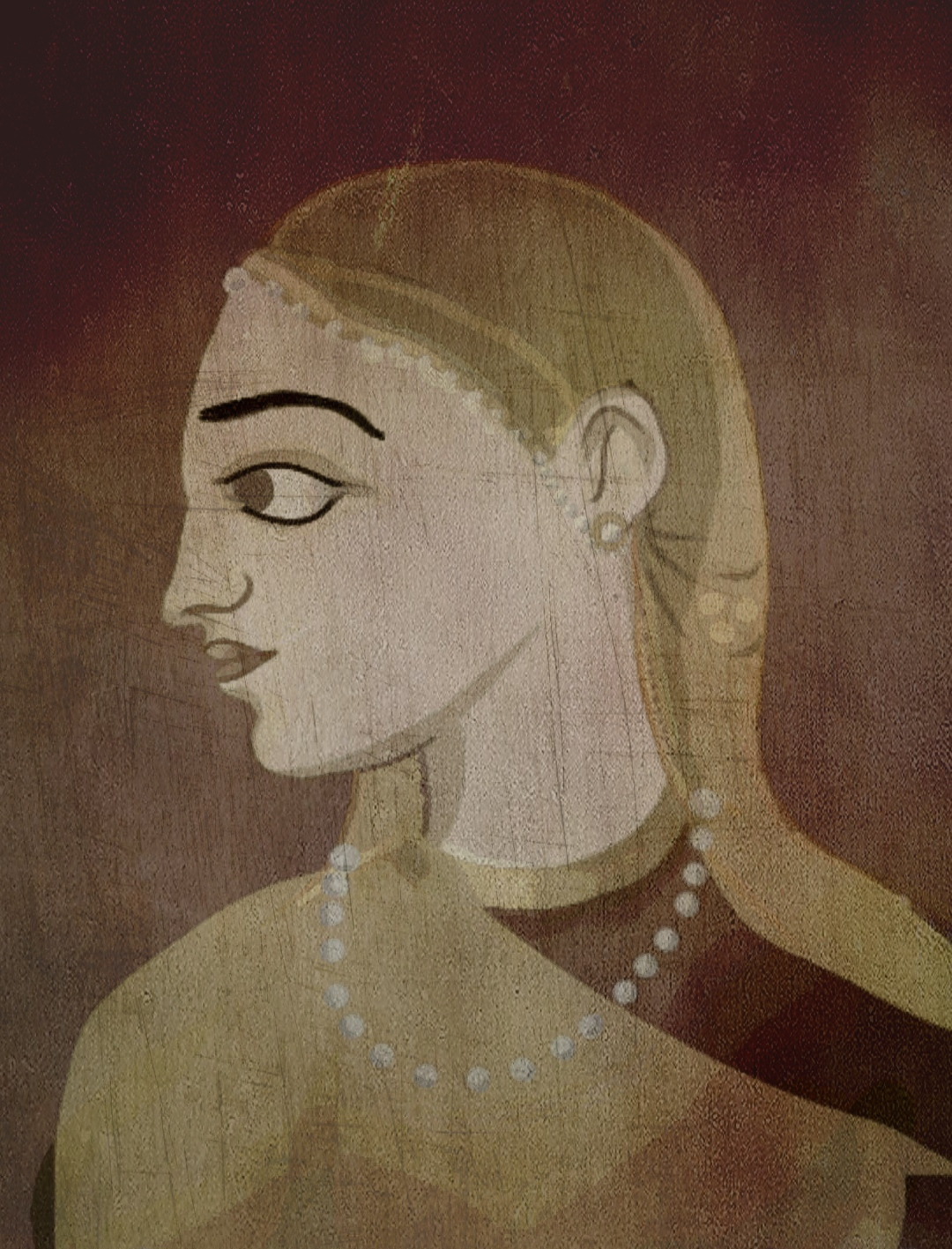
- An illustration of Duryodhana's wife

Information
- Affiliation: Kuru queen
- Family: Chitrangada (father)
- Spouse: Duryodhana
- Children: Lakshmana Kumara (son) ?
- Home: Kalinga (by birth); Hastinapur (by marriage)

One of Duryodhana’s wives, mentioned in all major recensions of the Mahabharata (including the Northern Chaturdhara, Southern Kumbakonam and the Critical Edition), is the princess of Kalinga, the daughter of King Chitrangada. Her story appears in the Shanti Parva, where the sage Narada narrates her swayamvara (self-choice ceremony). Although her name is not mentioned in the text, she is described as varavarṇinī (a woman of exceptional beauty).

The svayamvara was held in Rajapura, the capital of Kalinga, attracting several illustrious kings and warriors, such as Shishupala, Jarasandha, Bhishmaka, Rukmi, and others. As per the custom, the princess, described as kanchana-aṅginī (adorned in golden attire), entered the arena with a garland, accompanied by her dhātrī (nursemaid) and bodyguards. As she was introduced to the assembled kings and their lineages, she passed by Duryodhana, thereby rejecting him. Duryodhana, described as intoxicated by his prode, refused to accept the rejection. Enraged and captivated by her beauty, he abducted her, assisted by Karna. As Duryodhana abducted the princess, the kings present at the svayamvara pursued him. Karna engaged them in battle and defeated them single-handedly. Upon returning to Hastinapura, Duryodhana justified his act by citing the example of his great-grandfather Bhishma, who had similarly abducted the princesses of Kashi. Eventually, the princess consented to the marriage and became Duryodhana’s wife.

=== Kashi Princess ===
The Southern Kumbakonam edition of the Mahabharata mentions an additional wife of Duryodhana in detail, alongside the Kalinga princess. Her presence is noted a verse in the Adi Parva (Chapter 227) during Draupadi’s arrival at Hastinapura after her marriage to the Pandavas. This wife is identified as the princess of Kashi kingdom, and is called Kāśirājasutā (lit. daughter of King of Kashi). Along with the other daughters-in-law of Dhritarashtra, she welcomed Draupadi with great honour, comparing her to the divine goddess Śrī. The use of the term mahiṣī for her indicates her high status within Duryodhana’s household as the chief queen. The Gita Press version also mentions her.

In the Bhishma Parva (including that of the Northern Recension), it is referenced in a conversation that Karna helped Duryodhana in obtaining the Kashi princess as his bride as well, though the description of event appears to be identical to that of Kalinga princess.

== Secondary adaptations ==
Because of the sparse information about Duryodhana’s wives in the Mahabharata, later playwrights and storytellers expanded on their stories.

=== Malavi and Pauravi ===
Urubhanga by Bhāsa (c. 1st - 2nd century CE) is one of the earliest attempts to evoke karuna rasa (pathos) for Duryodhana, and as part of this transformation, Bhāsa expands the marital details of his life by creating his wives, Malavi and Pauravi, and a young son, Durjaya, for the narrative. Malavi and Pauravi arrive at the battlefield in a disheveled state, with unkempt hair and unveiled faces. The sight of them in such a state pains Duryodhana more than his physical injury, and he laments that while he barely felt the blow from Bhima’s mace earlier, the sight of his distressed wives now intensifies his suffering. He tries to console Malavi by reminding her of his status as a warrior who has died fighting bravely and asks why she is crying, calling her a warrior queen. Malavi responds that while she may be a warrior’s wife, she is first and foremost a woman and his wife, and so she must mourn. Duryodhana then turns to Pauravi and advises her to take pride in his glory, insisting that wives of such warriors should not grieve his death. In response, Pauravi expresses her intent to sacrifice herself in this manner, stating that instead of crying, she would rather follow her husband in death. Critics note that the portrayal of Duryodhana’s wives in Urubhanga reflects the customs and societal norms of their time.

=== Bhanumati ===
Bhatta Narayana (c. 11th century CE) created Bhanumati as Duryodhana's sole wife. David L. Gitomer, a scholar of Hinduism, observes that the character of Bhanumati, despite not appearing in any accessible Sanskrit version of the Mahabharata—where none of Duryodhana's wives are named—has become a firmly established figure in popular retellings of the epic. He highlights that many Indians, especially in South India, and even Sanskrit scholars, instinctively name Bhanumati as Duryodhana’s wife when asked. This, he suggests, is due to the way certain elements from later plays and adaptations, including the figure of Bhanumati, have become so deeply embedded in collective memory that they seem “naturally correct” and reappear in vernacular versions of the Mahabharata. According to Bishnupada Chakravarti, in modern times, Bhanumati has come to be identified as the Kalinga princess from the original epic.

==== Venisamhara ====
Venisamhara, a Sanskrit play by Bhatta Narayana, introduced the name Bhanumati as Duryodhana’s wife, portraying her as his sole spouse. Gitomer notes that Bhatta Narayana invents Bhanumati as Duryodhana’s wife to depict an ineffective, inappropriate passion between them, a parallel to the hidden passion between Bhima and Draupadi. Ratnamayidevi Dikshiti argues that since Duryodhana’s wife is barely mentioned in the Mahabharata, Bhanumati reflects Bhatta Narayana’s imagination and embodies a passive, dutiful ideal of womanhood. Her loyalty to Duryodhana shapes her morality, aligning her values entirely with his. While devoted, she is also portrayed as mean-spirited, and her shallow adherence to rituals is evident when Duryodhana easily distracts her with playful teasing.

In the play, Bhanumati plays a significant role in the first and second acts. Although Bhanumati does not appear on stage in this act, it is mentioned that Bhanumati insulted Draupadi by sarcastically commenting on her disheveled hair, which Draupadi had left untied as a sign of her unresolved humiliation from the dice game.

Bhanumati’s role gains prominence in Act II, where she appears troubled by a disturbing dream. Seated with her maid and friend, she resolves to perform religious rites to dispel the ill omens. Duryodhana enters, overhears her concern, and reassures her by emphasizing his strength and that of his brothers. While Bhanumati expresses trust in his protection, she remains intent on fulfilling her religious duties. Their conversation is interrupted by a commotion backstage. Frightened, Bhanumati clings to Duryodhana, who calms her, explaining it is only a storm. At her friend’s suggestion, they move to a safer spot, where Bhanumati feels thigh pain. Duryodhana expresses concern, playfully noting the wind has enhanced her beauty. As they rest, the chamberlain rushes in, reporting that the flag on Duryodhana’s chariot has broken. Bhanumati suggests performing a Vedic ritual to counter the bad omen, and Duryodhana reluctantly agrees. Shortly after, Duryodhana's sister, Duhsala, and her mother-in-law arrive in distress, warning Duryodhana of Arjuna’s vow to kill Jayadratha. Duryodhana dismisses their fears, mocking Arjuna’s threat. However, Bhanumati tactfully reminds him of the seriousness of the vow.

==== Other accounts ====
A Tamil folktale depicts a moment that highlights trust between Karna, Duryodhana, and Bhanumati. One evening, when Duryodhana is occupied with duties, he asks Karna to keep Bhanumati entertained. To pass the time, they play a game of dice, which soon becomes intense as Karna starts winning. Unexpectedly, Duryodhana returns early. Seeing him enter, Bhanumati rises respectfully, but Karna, unaware of Duryodhana’s arrival, misinterprets her action, thinking she is leaving out of frustration. In an attempt to stop her, Karna pulls her shawl, causing her pearl ornaments to scatter and her veil to slip, leaving her partially exposed. Bhanumati freezes, terrified of how her husband might react. Karna, realizing Duryodhana is watching, stands in shame and dread, expecting anger and accusations. But Duryodhana surprises them both by calmly asking his wife, “Should I collect the pearls, or would you like me to string them as well?” Karna and Bhanumati stare at him in shock, ashamed of how they have misjudged him.

In Indonesia, local adaptations of the Mahabharata further reimagine Bhanumati’s origin, in which she is the daughter of King Shalya, making her a cousin of Pandavas—Nakula and Sahadeva. This version introduces a new aspect—Bhanumati initially desires to marry Arjuna but agrees to wed Duryodhana due to her father’s wishes. This familial connection with Shalya is sometimes cited as the reason for his reluctant support of the Kaurava side during the Kurukshetra War.

Bhanumati, as the name of Duryodhana's wife, appears in the mediaeval-era scripture Skanda Purana. However, G. V. Tagare points out that there seems to be some ambiguity regarding her identity. He observes that the name Bhanumati already appears in the Harivamsa, an appendix to the Mahabharata, where she is described as the daughter of Bhanu, a Yadava leader, and is said to have married Sahadeva, one of the Pandavas, rather than Duryodhana. Tagare further notes that the authors of Skanda Purana change that, making her the daughter of Balarama (Duryodhana's teacher and a Yadava chief), who got her married to Duryodhana.

Modern writers have also adapted Bhanumati's character. Shivaji Sawant’s novel Mritunjaya, which centres on the life of Karna, retells Bhanumati's abduction from her svayamvara, identifying her as the princess of Kalinga from the Mahabharta. In this retelling, Bhanumati has a devoted maid named Supriya, who accompanies her during her abduction by Duryodhana and Karna. As Bhanumati eventually accepts Duryodhana as her husband, Supriya, following her mistress's path, chooses Karna as her spouse.

== Bibliography ==
- Sharma, Arvind (2007). Essays on the Mahābhārata. Motilal Banarsidass Publishers. ISBN 978-81-208-2738-7.
- "The Mahabharata, Book 11: Stri Parva: Stri-vilapa-parva: Section 17". www.sacred-texts.com.
- Chakravarti, Bishnupada (13 November 2007). Penguin Companion to the Mahabharata. Penguin UK. ISBN 978-93-5214-170-8.
- Pattanaik, Devdutt (2010). Jaya: An Illustrated Retelling of the Mahabharata. Penguin Books India. ISBN 978-0-14-310425-4.
- Menon, Ramesh (20 July 2006). The Mahabharata: A Modern Rendering. iUniverse. ISBN 978-0-595-84565-1.
