= Vrishasena =

Eldest son of Karna in Mahabharata

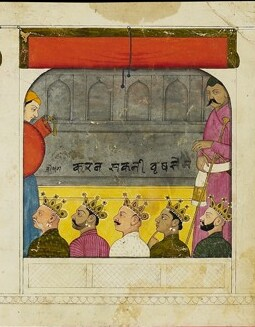
- A Pahari painting by Nainsukh illustrating Vrishasena (seated fourth from the left) alongside other notable Kaurava allies.

In-universe information
- Gender: Male
- Occupation: Kshatriya
- Family: Karna (father); Chitrasena, Dvipata, Satyasena, Sushena, Shatrunjaya, Banasena, Prasena (brothers)

In the Hindu epic Mahabharata, Vrishasena (Sanskrit: वृषसेन, romanized: Vṛṣasena) was the eldest son of the warrior Karna. Along with his father, he fought in the Kurukshetra War from the side of the Kauravas and faced many prominent warriors such as Drupada, Nakula, and Satanika.

== Kurukshetra War ==
During the Kurukshetra war, Karna did not take part for the first ten days due to the dispute he had with Bhishma. After Bhishma's fall on the 10th day of the war, Karna and his sons, including Vrishasena, joined the war on the 11th day and fought against the Pandavas.

=== Drona Parva ===
On the 11th day of the war, Vrishasena overwhelmed Satanika, the son of Nakula in a duel, and afterwards was overwhelmed by the other Draupadeyas. On 13th day of the war, Vrishasena was among the many warriors defeated by Abhimanyu. On the 14th night, in the battle following the death of Jayadratha, Vrishasena was defeated by Bhima. Later in the same night he fought Drupada, the King of Panchala, and defeated him. Finally, within the same night he was defeated by the Vrishni warrior Satyaki.

=== Karna Parva ===
On the 17th day of the war, Vrishasena fought Nakula. He was defeated and moved away from the immediate fight. Afterwards, Nakula and Vrishasena fought again, with Vrishasena emerging the victor and Nakula mounting Bhima's chariot. Afterwards Arjuna and Vrishasena fought, and in that battle Arjuna shot arrows that cut off Vrishasena's arms and head, killing him on the battlefield, in front of Karna.
