= Ahmedabad International Film Festival =

Annual film festival in Gujarat, India

- Location: Ahmedabad, India
- Hosted by: Omguru
- Language: International
- Website: theaiff.com

Current: 2026
- 2027 2025

The Ahmedabad International Film Festival (also known as AIFF) is an international film festival held annually in Ahmedabad, India.

== History ==
The festival was founded by Omguru in 2009 to promote the global exchange of ideas and stories, to showcase their talent to contemporary cinema, art and emerging and established filmmakers. More than 100 films were screened during the 2024 festival.

2024, the prestigious Lifetime Achievement Award at the AIFF, was honored at a reputed writer and poet Madhav Ramanuj, known for his intense contribution to Gujarati literature. Padma Shri Kanubhai Hasmukhbhai Tailor received the Lifetime Achievement Award for his social and disability welfare contribution. Actress Ayushi Dholakia won the Best Supporting actress Award at AIFF for her role in the film Kanubhai The Great. Actor Varun Kapoor attended the event as the chief guest.

2025 Over 3,000 films, spanning short films, feature films, and documentaries from more than 105 countries, have been registered to date at the Ahmedabad International Film Festival (AIFF).

== Awards ==
AIFF 2025 has 76 different category awards for films and short-films.

=== AIFF 2025 Winner List ===
Category		Movie	Recipient(s) and nominee(s)	Notes
Festival Mention		Srikanth	Rajkumar Rao, Tushar Hiranandani	
Festival Mention		Chandu Champion	Kartik Aaryan, Kabir Khan	
Short Film	Best Supporting Actor	Mukth	Shahid Kabeer	
Short Film	Best Supporting Actress	Alarm Gadhi	Dr Chetna Chauhan	
Short Film	Best Actor	Funeral Bier "Gahvara"	Himansh Kohli	
Short Film	Best Actor	Hunaar	Rohit Roy	
Short Film	Best Actress	Rekhaa	Tanvi Nimbhorkar	
Short Film	Best Director	Hunaar	Sujoy Mukharjee	
Short Film	Best Director	Sabina	Sanatan	
Short Film	Best Short Film	Trumpet	Aashish Bathri, Ashish Sahu, Yug Uikey	
Short Film	Best Child Actor	Radha	Jigyasa Singh	
Short Film	Jury Mention Short Film	Kaala Jamun	Atul Shrivastav	
Short Film	Jury Mention Short Film	Kaunsi Team ?	Jaywant Wadkar	
Short Film	Jury Mention Short Film	Help Yourself	Utkarsh Chaturvedi	
Short Film	Jury Mention Short Film	A Night, After All	Anshul Agrawal	
Short Film	Jury Mention Short Film	Free as Bird	Ashish Vidyarthi	
Short Film	Jury Mention Short Film	Betelgeuse	Sunder Konar	
Feature Film	Best Supporting Actor	Malhar	Sharib Hashmi	
Feature Film	Best Supporting Actress	Banaras Ban	Priyanka Bhole	
Feature Film	Best Supporting Actress	Ekachakram	Chaithra P	
Feature Film	Best Actor	Rotten Society	T Sunil Punnakkad	
Feature Film	Best Actress	Banaras Ban	Akankansha Pandey	
Feature Film	Best Actress	Mruggjal	Bhaswati Bora	
Feature Film	Best Actress	Rukmini	Snehal Deshmukh	
Feature Film	Best Director	Teenz	Radhakrishnan Parthiban	
Feature Film	Best Feature Film	Teenz	Radhakrishnan Parthiban	
Feature Film	Best Child Actor	Pravas	Vishal Thakkar	
Feature Film	Jury Mention Feature Film	Highdose	Amika Shail	
Feature Film	Jury Mention Feature Film	Malhar	Anjali Patil	
Feature Film	Jury Mention Feature Film	Ekachakram	K Suchendra Prasad	
Feature Film	Jury Mention Feature Film	Pravas	Vipul Sharma	
Feature Film	Jury Mention Feature Film	Chal Zindagi	Sanjay Mishra	
Feature Film	Jury Mention Feature Film	Teenz	Yogi Babu	
Creative Award	Best Documentary Film	Girte Sitaare	Hitarth Gajjar, Kenil Shah	
Creative Award	Best VFX	Teenz	Alcon Ravi, M. Subramaniya	
Creative Award	Best Editor	The Déjà vu	Kandarp Joshi	
Creative Award	Best Story	Taalee-ek Goonj (Clap - A Sound)	Dr. Sunil Koli	
Creative Award	Best Story	Second Chance	Anish Parag Shah	
Creative Award	Best Screenplay	Highdose	Dilip Vasudeo	
Creative Award	Best Cinematography	Mi Draupadi Murmu	Sandeep Vasant Rasal	
Creative Award	Best Music Video	Brother I'M Your Sister	Kruti Bhut	
Creative Award	Best Background Music	Street Fight	Santhosh R	
Creative Award	Best Divyang For All Category	Comicman	Ananthan Sreekanth	
Creative Award	Best Costume and Makeup	Canvas	Sanjai Chandrasekaran	
Creative Award	Best Special Effect	Betelgeuse	Sunder Konar	
Creative Award	Student Project	Two of Hearts	Aashmani Pramod Bhadane	
Creative Award	Best Animation	Love Dosti India	Prabhat Sardar	

=== 2026 ===
The 17th edition of the Ahmedabad International Film Festival was held from 30 September to 2 October 2026, according to the festival's official website.

The festival reported receiving more than 4,700 entries from 150 countries for its 2026 edition. The programme included Indian and international short films, feature films, documentaries, animation, music videos and films across various creative and technical categories.

Films associated with alumni of Don Bosco College, Panjim, including Smoke and Mirrors, Bhaangar Kalakusar Karigiri, XIM: The Boundary and Toto, were selected for the 2026 edition of the festival. The films were made by filmmakers associated with the college's Mass Communication programme. the festival selected the documentary Thiruvarangar – The Deity Singers, directed by Shaji A John, for screening.

The festival's 2026 submission rules allowed films to be submitted through FilmFreeway, Filmfestplatform and Festhome. The rules distinguish between films entered for public screening and entries submitted for award consideration without public screening.
