= Barkha Singh =

Indian actress and model (born 1992)

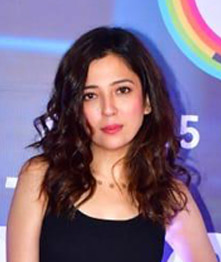
- Singh in 2024
- Born: 3 August 1992 (age 34); Bikaner, Rajasthan, India
- Occupations: Actress; model
- Years active: 2002–present

YouTube information
- Channel: Barkha Singh
- Years active: 2020–present
- Genres: Lifestyle, travel, fashion, vlog
- Subscribers: 471 thousand
- Views: 97 million
- Last updated: 27 October 2025
- Website: YouTube

Barkha Singh (born 3 August 1992) is an Indian actress who mainly works in Hindi films and web shows. She began her career as a child artist and worked in films such as Mujhse Dosti Karoge! (2002) and Samay: When Time Strikes (2003). She then worked in television shows including Bhagyalaxmi (2015) and Girls on Top (2016).

Singh is best known for her portrayals in the web shows Engineering Girls and Please Find Attached and the films, 36 Farmhouse and Maja Ma (2022).

== Career ==
Barkha Singh started her career as a child artist. She played the younger Kareena Kapoor as Tina in Mujhse Dosti Karoge. Barkha Singh is well known for her role as Gia Sen in the show Girls on Top, broadcast on MTV India. She also played her cameo role in the serial MTV Fanaah as Vedika. Barkha is known for her character in the serial Yeh Hai Aashiqui and Love by Chance, as well as her role of Surbhi Varun Shukla in the soap opera Bhagyalaxmi on &TV.

She started her own YouTube page in January 2018, posting several travel and fashion blogs. She has gained fame from doing several popular web shows like Please Find Attached, Work Life Balance, Engineering Girls, Murder Meri Jaan, and Netflix's Masaba Masaba (S2). Her recently released web series was The Great Wedding of Munnes opposite Abhishek Banerjee. In 2021 she was seen in the movie Silence... Can You Hear It? starring Manoj Bajpayee, and in 2022 she was seen leading in two movies, 36 Farmhouse and Maja Maa. She has also appeared in some of Ashish Chanchlani YouTube videos.

== In the media ==
Singh has been associated with brands such as Amazon, Cadbury, Coca-Cola and Clinic Plus. She has appeared in multiple television commercials and is an animal activist. Apart from acting, she has hosted online game shows.

== Filmography ==
=== Films ===
Year	Title	Role	Notes	Ref.
2002	Mujhse Dosti Karoge!	Tina Kapoor	Child artist	
2003	Samay: When Time Strikes	Anjali	Child artist	
2007	Apna Asmaan	Pinky Sharma	Child artist	
2019	House Arrest	Pinky		
2020	The Dealer	Dealer Barkha	Short film	
2021	Silence... Can You Hear It?	Pooja Choudhary		
2021	OTP: The Lottery - Part 2	Ritu	Short film	
2022	36 Farmhouse	Antara Raj Singh		
2022	Maja Ma	Esha Hansraj		
2024	The Sabarmati Report	Shloka	Cameo appearance	
2026	Bhai Tera Star Hai	Laila		

=== Television ===
Year	Title	Role	Notes	Ref.
2013	Yeh Hai Aashiqui	Neeti	Season 1	
2014	MTV Fanaah	Vedika		
2014	Love By Chance	Kavya	Episode: "Bhootiyapanti"	
2014	CID	Sona/Myra		
2015	Bhagyalaxmi	Surbhi Prajapati Shukla		
2015	Secret Diaries: The Hidden Chapters	Bindya		
2015	Aahat	Simran	Season 6	
2016	Girls on Top	Gia Sen		
2017	Jaat Ki Jugni	Jyoti Singh		

=== Web series ===
Year	Title	Role	Notes	Ref.
2018	Kaisi Yeh Yaariaan	Jeffrina "Jeff"	Season 3	
2018	Pubg India Life Battle Royale	Naomi	Short film	
2018–2021	Engineering Girls	Tejaswini "Sabu" Rathi	2 seasons	
2018	Breathe	Vrushali		
2019	Home Sweet Office	Adhira		
2019–2022	Please Find Attached	Sanya Agarwal	3 seasons	
2021	Murder Meri Jaan	Sonal		
2022	Masaba Masaba	Aisha Mehrauli	Season 2	
2022	The Great Weddings of Munnes	Mahi		
2025	Criminal Justice: A Family Matter	Shivani Mathur		
