= Bharati Kumar =

Indian actress (born 1987)

- Born: Bharti Kumar Sresthas; 26 January 1987 (age 39); Delhi, India
- Occupations: Actress; dancer
- Years active: 2010–2016
- Known for: Ishaan: Sapno Ko Awaaz De; Humse Hai Liife; The Buddy Project
- Spouse: Kunal Jaisingh (m. 2018)

Bharati K Jaisingh (born 26 January 1987) is an Indian actress and dancer known for her work in Hindi television. Kumar is best known for her portrayal of Twinkle in Ishaan: Sapno Ko Awaaz De, Miloni Singhal in Humse Hai Liife and Kiya Gujral in The Buddy Project.

== Personal life ==
Kumar met actor Kunal Jaisingh on the sets of The Buddy Project in 2012. The two were in a relationship for five years. Kumar and Jaisingh got engaged on 18 March 2018 and married each other on 20 December 2018 in Mumbai.

== Career ==
Kumar made her television debut in 2010 with Disney's Ishaan: Sapno Ko Awaaz De where she played Twinkle. In 2012, she played Miloni Singhal in Humse Hai Liife.

Kumar is widely known for playing Kiya Gujral in the 2012 show The Buddy Project, opposite Fahad Ali. The series was well received

In 2014, Kumar played Sheena in Yam Hain Hum. From 2014 to 2016, Kumar played Niharika, Ishita and Tina in three episodes of Pyaar Tune Kya Kiya. In 2015, Kumar played Raina Mehra in Twist Wala Love, opposite Kunal Jaisingh.

In 2016, she appeared in two short films - It Happened That Night alongside Kunal Jaisingh and Rubaroo, which marked her final screen appearance.

== Filmography ==
=== Films ===
Year	Title	Role	Notes	Ref.
2016	It Happened That Night	Love	Short film	
2016	Rubaroo	Bharati	Short film	

=== Television ===
Year	Title	Role	Notes	Ref.
2010	Ishaan: Sapno Ko Awaaz De	Twinkle		
2012	Humse Hai Liife	Miloni Singhal		
2012	The Buddy Project	Kiya Gujral		
2014	Yam Hain Hum	Sheena		
2014	Pyaar Tune Kya Kiya	Niharika		
2015	Twist Wala Love	Raina Mehra		
2015	Pyaar Tune Kya Kiya	Ishita		
2016	Pyaar Tune Kya Kiya	Tara		
