= Neeraj Sood =

Indian actor

- Education: National School of Drama
- Occupation: Actor
- Years active: 1999 to present

Neeraj Sood is an Indian actor who appears in Hindi-language films and television. He is known for his roles in films like Matrubhoomi, Rocket Singh: Salesman of the Year, Samay and Shubh Mangal Saavdhan.

== Acting career ==
Neeraj Sood started his acting with career small screen. He managed to bag a role in Sony TV’s Missing in 1999. He soon started getting roles in many serials and by the year 2000 he was seen in popular serials like Kagaar, Drishtant, Lekin, Thriller@10, Kadam and B4line. In the same year he made his big screen debut in Bollywood with Kali Salwar. Two years later he was cast in critically acclaimed films like Ek Haseena Thi, Pinjar and Samay. Soon he started getting recognition as an actor.

Neeraj Sood has successfully managed to work in both small and big screens for years. Yahaan, Black & White, Agneepath, Tere Naam, Band Baja Baarat are some of his notable films, whereas Khauf, Hqeeqat, Kituu Sabb Jaantii Hai, Zindagi Khatti Meethi are some of his popular works on small screen.

Apart from acting in films and tele serials, Neeraj Sood has appeared in number of advertorials. He has worked for popular brands like Docomo, Cadbury Eclairs, Idea, Kala Hit, Perk, Just Buy App, Dailyhunt. Carwale.com, Birla Cement and Kosh Atta. His most popular advertorial appearance was Cadbury Miss Palanpur ad where he was cast alongside Amitabh Bachchan. He has also appeared in Star Plus Nayi Soch ad campaign alongside Aamir Khan, Sony Networks 'HAPPY INDIA' pack and Red Lebel Republic Day ad.

== Filmography ==
=== Films ===
Year	Title	Role	Notes
2002	Kali Salwar		
2003	Pinjar		
2003	Samay	Photographer	
2003	Dhoop	Dobriyal	
2003	Calcutta Mail	Avinash's friend	
2003	Matrubhoomi	Gopal	
2005	Yahaan		
2005	Mangal Pandey: The Rising	Bangdu	
2006	Dil Se Poochh Kidhar Jaana Hai		
2006	Kya Tum Ho	Baiju	
2007	Kuch Khel Kuch Masti		
2008	Hulla	Client in Godown	
2008	Black & White		
2009	Rocket Singh: Salesman of the Year	Lalwani	
2010	Band Baaja Baaraat	Maqsood	
2012	Agneepath		
2013	Meridian Lines		
2013	Dedh Ishkqiya		
2014	Darr@ the Mall	Rajendra Singh	
2014	Bhootnath Returns		
2015	Tera Mera Tedha Medha	MS	
2015	Phantom	Shopkeeper	
2017	Shubh Mangal Saavdhan	Sugandha's father	
2018	Brina	Daulatram	
2018	Yahan Sabhi Gyani Hai		
2018	Manto	Kishori	
2018	Mitron	Father	
2019	Setters	Bhanu	
2019	Jabariya Jodi	Pathak ji	
2020	Suraj Pe Mangal Bhari	Pandit Dubey Ji	
2020	Darklight	Panditji	
2020	Das Capital Gulamon Ki Rajdhani	Dallu Singh	& Dayal Nihalni
2021	83		
2021	Dilphire	Ramdeen	
2022	Good Luck Jerry	Anil	Disney Plus Hotstar film
2022	Raksha Bandhan	Harishankar	
2023	Zara Hatke Zara Bachke	Purushottam Mama	
2024	Gahvara	Father	Short film
2024	Chote Nawab	Nasir Rizvi	
2026	Aryabhatt Ka Zero	Aryabhatt Srivastava	

=== Television series ===
Neeraj Sood has appeared in more than 25 serials on Indian National Television.

Year	Series	Broadcasting Channel
1999	Missing	Sony TV
2000	Kagaar	Sahara One
2000	Drishtant	
2000	Lekin	Star Plus
2000	Thriller@10	Zee TV
2000	Kadam	Sahara One
2000	B4line	Sahara One
2001	Zohra Mahal	ETC
2001	Star Bestsellers	Star Plus
2001	Khauf	SAB TV
2001	Haqeeqat	Sahara One
2002	Kashmeer	Star Plus
2004	Rat Hone Ko Hai	Sahara One
2005	Siddhant	Star One
2005	Kituu Sabb Jaantii Hai	Sahara One
2008	Shubh Kadam	Sahara One
2010	Mr. & Mrs. Sharma Allahabadwale	SAB TV
2011	Humse Hai Liife	Channel V
2011	Afsar Bitiya	Zee TV
2013	Tota Mayna	SAB TV
2014	Zindagi Khatti Meethi	Disney
2014	Servece Wali Bahu	Zee TV
2017	Partners	SAB TV
2018	Krishna Chali London	Star Plus
2018	Bitti Business Wali	&TV
2025	Do You Wanna Partner	Amazon Prime Video
