= Shavez Khan =

Indian television actor (born 1994)

- Born: 30 June 1994 (age 31); India
- Occupation: Actor
- Years active: present

Shavez Khan is an Indian television actor. He has done his roles in various Indian television shows like Shaitaan, Encounter, Ek Hasina Thi, Savdhaan India, SuperCops vs Supervillains, Pyaar Ka The End, Pyaar Kii Ye Ek Kahaani, MTV Fanaah, Crime Patrol. He has played his recent role in Sony TV's CID.

== Television ==
- Colors's Shaitaan
- Sony TV's Encounter, Crime Patrol & CID
- Star Plus's Ek Hasina Thi
- Life OK's Savdhaan India & SuperCops vs Supervillains
- Bindass' Pyaar Ka The End
- Star One's Pyaar Kii Ye Ek Kahaani
- MTV's MTV Fanaah
