= Anisa Butt =

British actress

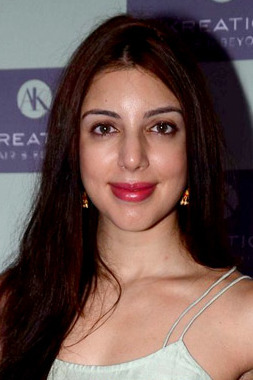
- Anisa at the launch of salon A' Kreations
- Born: 18 January 1993 (age 33); London, England
- Education: University of London
- Occupation: Actress
- Years active: 2010–present
- Known for: Ishaan: Sapno Ko Awaaz De

Anisa Butt (born 18 January 1993) is a British television and film actress who works in Indian television and cinema. She started her career as a child artist in the television show Ishaan: Sapno Ko Awaaz De, which aired on Disney Channel India. She made her film debut in Shuja Ali's movie Baat Bann Gayi.

== Early life ==
Anisa Butt was born in London, England into an Indian Kashmiri Muslim family. Anisa graduated from University of London with a B.A. in Drama (Performance). She is a self-taught dancer and has performed dance and drama at the Royal Albert hall. She has also attended Kevin Spacey's workshop at The Old Vic theater.

== Career ==
In 2010, Anisa started her career with Disney Channel India's show Ishaan: Sapno Ko Awaaz De as Shyla. In 2011, she made a cameo appearance in Zindagi Na Milegi Dobara as Tanya. She was spotted with Shahrukh Khan in an advertisement for Navratna Seeti Bajao, directed by Rajkumar Hirani.

In 2013, she has made a small appearance in Yeh Jawaani Hai Deewani with Ranbir Kapoor and Deepika Padukone in the lead roles. She made her film debut with Baat Bann Gayi in the lead role opposite Ali Fazal. The film also co-starred Gulshan Grover and Amrita Raichand and was released on 11 October 2013.

In 2017, she had made a small appearance in Half Girlfriend with Arjun Kapoor and Shraddha Kapoor in the lead roles.

== Filmography ==
=== Films and TV Shows ===
Year	Title	Role	Notes
2010	Ishaan: Sapno Ko Awaaz De	Shyla	Child Actress
2010	Jhoota Hi Sahi	Kabir's girlfriend Bhavna	
2011	Zindagi Na Milegi Dobara	Tanya	Kalki Koechlin's (Natasha) sister
2013	Yeh Jawaani Hai Deewani	Preeti	Lara's Friend
2013	Baat Bann Gayi	Rachna	
2016	Brahman Naman	Anita	Ronnie's girlfriend
2017	Half Girlfriend	Rutvi	Madhav's friends wife
2019	Yumbarzallo		Music video by Zee Music. Singer Yawar Abdal

=== Web series ===
Year	Title	Role	Platform	Notes
2019	The Verdict - State vs Nanavati	Sheetal	ALTBalaji and ZEE5	
2019	BOSS: Baap of Special Services	Tanya	ALT Balaji	
2020	Code M	Gayatri Chauhan	ALTBalaji and ZEE5	
