= Karriena Shah =

Indian actor

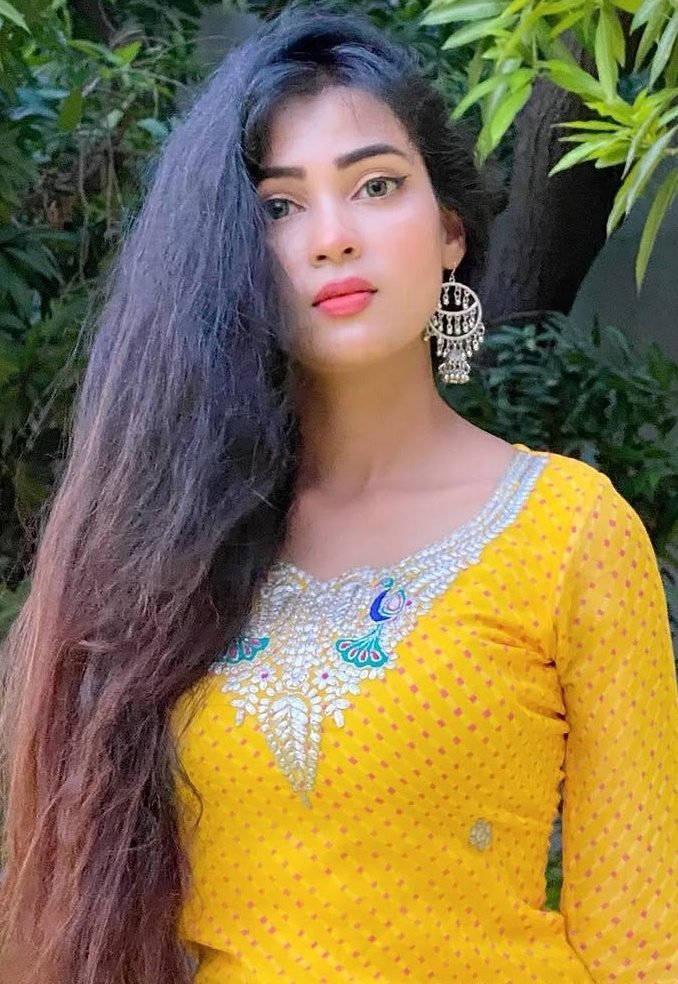
- Born: Mumbai
- Occupation: Actress Model
- Years active: 2015 - present

Karriena Shah is an Indian actress, model and vlogger who appears in Tollywood films. She is a face of the Abbott 2019 and brand ambassador of Ayurcare perfect figure. She also appears in Hindi television series, like secret diary channel v, Pyaar Tune Kya Kiya season 3 and season 9, CID, Savdhaan India, and Aahat (season 6). She did many TV ads, album songs, hoardings, cover pages and is a face of many products. She also represented India in a German movie worked with jullian benedickt. She is lead in a Tamil movie Beauty released in March 2023 in opposite actor Rishi

== Television ==
- Zing's Pyaar Tune Kya Kiya
- Sony TV's CID and Aahat (season 6)
- Life OK's Savdhaan India
- secret diary channel v
