= Rohan Shah =

Indian actor (born 1994)

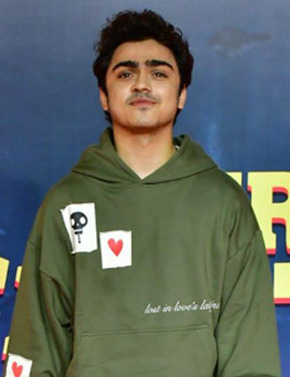
- Shah in 2024
- Born: 29 December 1994 (age 31); Mumbai, Maharashtra, India
- Occupation: Actor
- Years active: 2010–present
- Employer: "FilterCopy" (YouTube channel)

Rohan Shah (born 29 December 1994) is an Indian actor, known for his role as Mandy in Ishaan: Sapno Ko Awaaz De on Disney Channel India and Agham Neil Khanna in Itna Karo Na Mujhe Pyaar on Sony TV. He played the lead role of Vivek in the 2020 Bollywood film Hacked along with Hina Khan. He is also associated with the YouTube channel FilterCopy, with whom he acts frequently for their short films.

== Career ==
Rohan made his debut with television commercial ads in the year 2001. Apart from those, he started doing various films and TV shows like Boogie Woogie, Ishaan: Sapno Ko Awaaz De, Humse Hai Liife, V The Serial, Gumrah: End of Innocence, and others.

== Filmography ==
Year	Title	Role	Notes	Ref.
2004	Kyun! Ho Gaya Na...	Young Ishaan	child artist (debut film)	
2009	Aao Wish Karein	Young Bonny	child artist	
2011	Tere Mere Phere	Raju		
2013	Krrish 3	Young Kaal		
2019	Kulkarni Chaukatla Deshpande	Unknown	Marathi film	
2019	Cargo	Shashank	Cameo	
2020	Hacked	Vivek		

=== Television ===
Year(s)	Title	Role	Notes
2010–2011	Ishaan: Sapno Ko Awaaz De	Mandy	Debut TV show
2011	Humse Hai Liife	Gautam Dhillion	
2012	V The Serial	Rohan Shah	
2013	Yeh Hai Aashiqui	Rishi	Season 1
2014	Itna Karo Na Mujhe Pyaar	Agham Neil Khanna	
2014	MTV Fanaah	Adwik	
2015	Stories by Rabindranath Tagore	Tarapada	Episode: "Atithi"
2015	kabhi Aise Geet Gaya Karo	Ranbir Choudhary	
2017	Savdhaan India	Sumit	
2017	Bade Achhe Lagte Hai	Moksha	
2017	Shockers	Unknown	

=== Web series ===
Year	Title	Role	Notes
2013	TVF Qtiyapa - Aaram Se Padhunga	Student	
2017	Class of 2017	Nikhil	
2017	CyberSquad	Ketan "KD" Desai	
2018	It's Not That Simple	Jassi	
2018	Every School Romance	Rohan	
2018	Damaged	Rohan	
2020	Bandish Bandits	Student	Song: "Chedkhaniyaan"
