= Pukaar (Indian TV series) =

- Also known as: Pukaar - Call for the Hero
- Genre: Action; Drama
- Directed by: Deven Bhojani
- Starring: Rannvijay Singh
- Country of origin: India
- Original language: Hindi
- No. of episodes: 24

Production
- Producer: Vipul Amrutlal Shah
- Camera setup: Multi-camera
- Running time: 45 minutes

Original release
- Network: Life OK
- Release: 24 November 2014 – 10 February 2015

Pukaar (also known as Pukaar – Call for the Hero) is an Indian action-drama television series that premiered on 24 November 2014 and aired on Life OK. The show is directed by Deven Bhojani and produced by Vipul Amrutlal Shah, starring Rannvijay Singh.

== Cast ==
- Rannvijay Singh as Major Rajveer Shergill
- Raj Babbar as Amarjeet Shergill
- Prashant Narayanan as Dhanraj Rastogi
- Adah Sharma as Aarti
- Kiran Karmarkar as Advocate Ashok Pradhan
- Manish Nawani as Rahul Shergill
- Vipin Sharma as Bashir Khan
- Shubhangi Latkar as Jyoti Shergill
- Deepraj Rana as A.C.P Dilawar Rana
- Dishank Arora as Captain Yuvraj Shergill
