= Aryabhatt Ka Zero =

2026 Indian Hindi-language drama film

- Directed by: Kamal Chandra
- Screenplay by: Tariq Mohammad
- Produced by: Birender Bhagat; Ravi S. Gupta; Sanjay Nagpal; Sheo Balak Singh
- Starring: Himansh Kohli; Sonnalli Seygall; Ravi Kishan; Darshana Banik; Shilpa Shinde; Alka Amin; Neeraj Sood
- Cinematography: Yogesh Jani
- Edited by: Sandeep Singh Bajeli
- Music by: Manan Bhardwaj
- Production companies: Newtech Media Entertainment; Radhika G Films; Sunil Sihag Gora Films; A2R Films
- Distributed by: VK Films
- Release date: 7 August 2026
- Running time: 114 minutes
- Country: India
- Language: Hindi

Aryabhatt Ka Zero is an Indian Hindi-language drama film starring Himansh Kohli, Sonnalli Seygall, Darshana Banik, Naresh Vohra, Alka Amin and Neeraj Sood, with Shilpa Shinde anndd Ravi Kishan .

== Synopsis ==
The narrative of Aryabhatt Ka Zero is an uplifting drama centred around dreams, resilience, and the limitless potential hidden within the concept of "zero." The story follows the life of a young man navigating heartbreak, repeated failures, the weight of family expectations, and societal judgements. The film illustrates how personal setbacks and challenges can be transformed into opportunities, ultimately serving as stepping stones toward future success and growth. The movie is about battling with societal perceptions and believing in astrology

== Cast ==
- Himansh Kohli as Baggu
- Sonnalli Seygall as Rinku
- Ravi Kishan as Chhannu bhaiya
- Darshana Banik as Bobby
- Rajesh Sharma as Tyagi ji
- Alka Amin as Manju
- Shilpa Shinde as Simmi
- Neeraj Sood as Aryabhatt Srivastava

== Production ==
Initially titled Boondi Raita, poster released in 2020, Shooting Stopped in 2021, Because of COVID 19 lockdown , later the shoot of film completed in 2021 in Dehradun.

Aryabhatt Ka Zero is produced by Birender Bhagat, Ravi S. Gupta, Sanjay Nagpal and Sheo Balak Singh under the banners of Newtech Media Entertainment, Radhika G Films and Sunil Sihag Gora Films, in association with A2R Films. The co-producers are Sunil Sihag, Triloki Nath Prasad, Late Kuldeep Bhandari, Aakansha Rahul Sharma and Rita Gadge. The film is directed by Kamal Chandra from a screenplay and dialogues written by Tariq Mohammad. The music is composed by Manan Bhardwaj. The music rights acquired by T-series.

In mid-July 2026, the filmmakers released a 1-minute and 10-second teaser trailer, highlighting Himansh Kohli's character as he searches for respect while battling various personal and societal obstacles.
