= Dil Jo Na Keh Saka =

2017 album starring Himansh Konli and Priya Banerjee

- Screenplay by: Sanjay Chil
- Starring: Himansh kohli Priya Banerjee; Manoj Pahwa
- Cinematography: Harsh Raj Shroff
- Edited by: Charu Shree Roy
- Music by: Shail-Pritesh
- Production company: T-Series
- Distributed by: PVR Pictures; Supergood Films
- Release date: 17 November 2017
- Running time: 130 minutes
- Country: India
- Language: Hindi

Dil Jo Na Keh Saka (transl. What the heart couldn't say) is a 2017 Indian Hindi-language romantic drama film starring Himansh kohli and Canadian actress Priya Banerjee. The trailer of the film was released on 26 October 2017. The film has been directed by Naresh Lalwani and was released worldwide on 17 November 2017. The film has been shot entirely in Shimla.

== Plot ==
The story revolves around two childhood friends Jai and Sia, played by Himansh Kohli and Priya Banerjee, who go separate ways in pursuit of their respective dreams. When they return to their hometown and meet after a long separation they understand that their relationship is more than just friendship.

== Cast ==
- Himansh Kohli as Jay
- Priya Banerjee as Sona / Siya
- Manoj Pahwa as Veer
- Farida Dadi as Beeji
- Navni Parihar as Saroj
- Deepika Amin as Karuna Kapoor
- Kenneth Desai as Adv. Ramesh Kapoor
- Asheish Roy as Ujjwal
- Bhuvnesh Mann as Kabir
- Swati Bakshi as Shine
- Jashanpreet Singh Kohli as Sukhi
- Diksha Juneja as Natasha

== Soundtrack ==
Dil Jo Na Keh Saka

Soundtrack album by Shail-Pritesh
- Released: 7 November 2017
- Genre: Feature film soundtrack
- Length: 24:46
- Language: Hindi
- Label: T-Series

Singles from Dil Jo Na Keh Saka
- 1. "Bandh Khwabon Ki" Released: 31 October 2017; 2. "Tanha Tanha" Released: 3 November 2017; 3. "Band Vyah Da Baje" Released: 6 November 2017

The music of the film is composed by Shail-Pritesh while the lyrics have been penned by A. M. Turaz, Devshi Khanduri and Sandeep Singh Kamboj. The first song of the film titled as "Bandh Khwabon Ki" sung by Shail Hada was released on 31 October 2017. The second song of the film "Tanha Tanha" which is sung by Jubin Nautiyal and Aditi Paul was released on 3 November 2017. The third single to be released was "Band Vyah Da Baje" which is sung by Divya Kumar and Pratibha Singh Baghel was released on 6 November 2017. The soundtrack was released by T-Series on 7 November 2017.

All music is composed by Shail-Pritesh.

Track listing
No.	Title	Lyrics	Singer(s)	Length
1.	"Dil Jo Na Keh Saka"	A. M. Turaz	Shreya Ghoshal, Shail Hada	4:09
2.	"Bandh Khwabon Ki"	A. M. Turaz	Shail Hada	4:37
3.	"Nadaniyan Kar Jati Hain"	Devshi Khanduri	Ryan Victor, Aditi Paul	4:02
4.	"Band Vyah Da Baje"	Sandeep Singh Kamboj	Divya Kumar, Pratibha Singh Baghel	3:34
5.	"Khwabon Ko Ankhon Mein"	A. M. Turaz	Aditi Paul, Shail Hada	4:28
6.	"Tanha Tanha"	A. M. Turaz	Jubin Nautiyal, Aditi Paul	3:56
Total length:				24:46

== Production ==
This is actress Priya Banerjee's second role as a lead in a Hindi film. The film has been shot extensively in Shimla.

The music of Dil Jo Na Keh Saka has been composed by Shail Hada and Pritesh Mehta.

The film will be released by PVR Pictures.
