= Kunal Jaisingh =

Indian actor (born 1989)

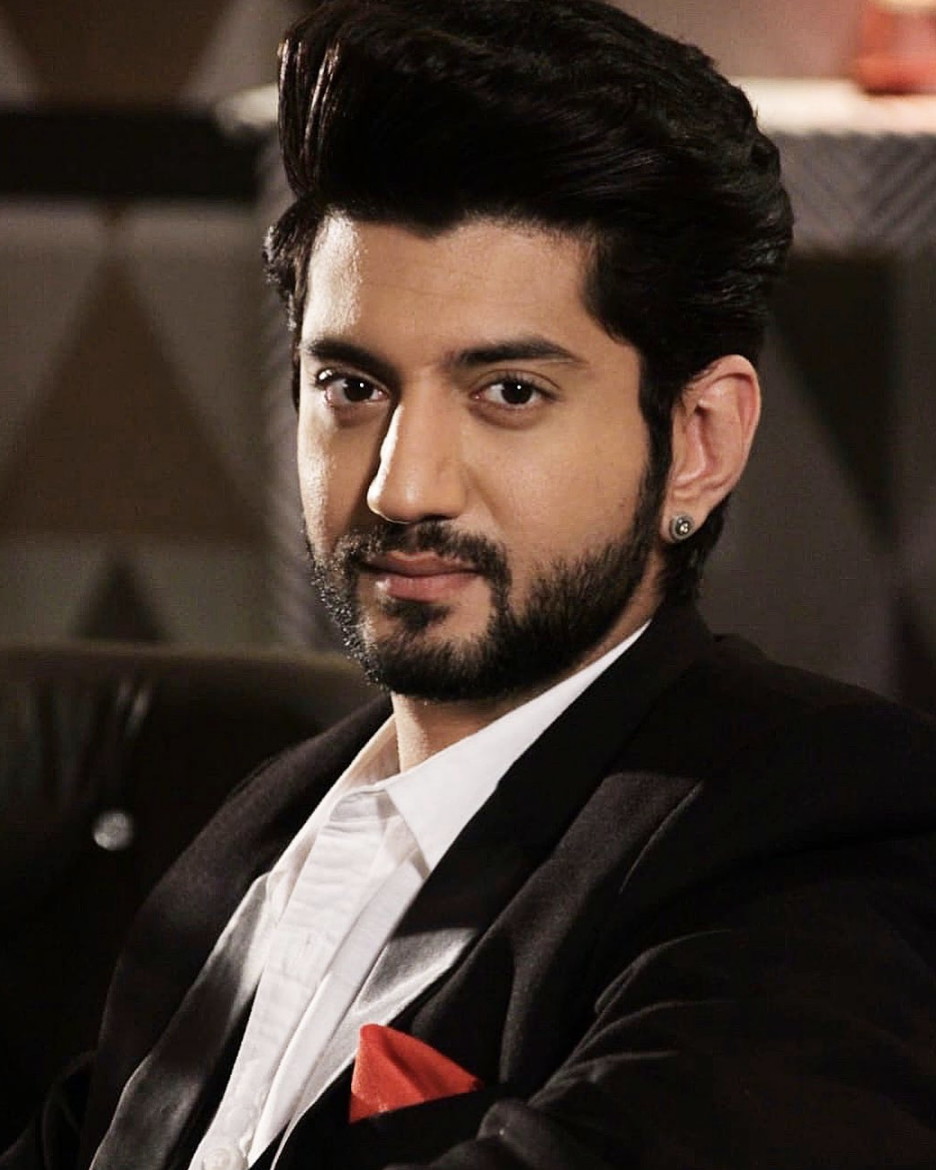
- Jaisingh in 2019
- Born: 29 July 1989 (age 37); Mumbai, Maharashtra, India
- Occupation: Actor
- Years active: 2011–present
- Notable work: The Buddy Project; Ishqbaaaz; Dil Boley Oberoi; Silsila Badalte Rishton Ka 2 Kyun Utthe Dil Chhod Aaye
- Spouse: Bharati Kumar (m. 2018)

Kunal Jaisingh (born 29 July 1989) is an Indian actor who predominantly works in Hindi television. Jaisingh is widely recognised for his portrayal of Omkara Singh Oberoi in Ishqbaaaz and its spin-off series, Dil Boley Oberoi. The former earned him an Indian Telly Award and a Gold Award.

Jaisingh made his acting debut in 2011 with Mann Kee Awaaz Pratigya. He is known for playing Ranveer Shergill in The Buddy Project, Reyansh Khurana in Pavitra Bhagya, Veer Pratap Singh in Kyun Utthe Dil Chhod Aaye and Kabir Singh Shekhawat Muskuraane Ki Vajah Tum Ho. Jaisingh made his web debut with Silsila Badalte Rishton Ka 2 as Ruhaan.

== Early life ==
Jaisingh was born on 29 July 1989 in Mumbai, Maharashtra into a Hindu family. Jaisingh completed his graduation from H.R. College of Commerce and Economics.

== Career ==
=== Debut and early work (2011-2015) ===
Jaisingh made his acting debut with Mann Kee Awaaz Pratigya where he played a mute guy, Sarang. From 2012 to 2014, Jaisingh played Ranveer Shergill, his first lead role as a college student in The Buddy Project, opposite Palak Jain. The series was well received.

In 2014 and 2015, Jaisingh played Prince Jeet Singh and Abhishek respectively in two episodes of Yeh Hai Aashiqui. In 2015, he also played Chiku Gaurav Singh in Doli Armaano Ki and Aryan in Twist Wala Love opposite Bharati Kumar.

=== Success with Ishqbaaaz and beyond (2016-present) ===
In 2016, Jaisingh first appeared in the short film It Happened That Night, alongside Bharati Kumar. In the same year, he played episodic roles of Arjun and Ruzbeh in Savdhaan India and Pyaar Tune Kya Kiya respectively.

From 2016 to 2018, Jaisingh played Omkara Singh Oberoi in Ishqbaaaz opposite Shrenu Parikh. The show proved to be a major success and earned him recognition. He later won the Indian Telly Award for Best Actor in a Supporting Role and Gold Award for Best Actor in a Supporting Role for the show. In 2017, he played Omkara in Indian television's first spin-off series, Dil Boley Oberoi opposite Shrenu Parikh.

Jaisingh made his web debut in 2019 with Silsila Badalte Rishton Ka 2, playing Ruhan opposite Tejasswi Prakash and Aneri Vajani. In 2020, Jaisingh played Reyansh Khurana in Pavitra Bhagya opposite Aneri Vajani, which was ended abruptly. Then in 2021, Jaisingh played a prince Veer Pratap Singh in Kyun Utthe Dil Chhod Aaye, opposite Gracy Goswami.

Jaisingh played a businessman Kabir Singh Shekhawat, in Muskuraane Ki Vajah Tum Ho, opposite Tanvi Malhara in 2022. In 2023, he played Anirban Banerjee opposite Adrija Roy and Rachi Sharma in Durga Aur Charu.

== Personal life ==
Jaisingh met actress Bharati Kumar on the set of The Buddy Project in 2012. The two were in a relationship for five years. Jaisingh and Kumar got engaged on 18 March 2018 and married each other on 20 December 2018 in Mumbai.

== In the media ==
In UK-based newspaper Eastern Eye's list of 50 Sexiest Asian Men, Jaisingh was placed 48th in 2018. In Times' Most Desirable Men on TV, Jaisingh was placed 17th in 2020.

== Filmography ==
=== Films ===
Year	Title	Role	Notes	Ref.
2016	It Happened That Night	War	Short film	

=== Television ===
Year	Title	Role	Notes	Ref.
2011	Mann Kee Awaaz Pratigya	Sarang "Gunga"		
2012–2014	The Buddy Project	Ranveer Shergill		
2014	Yeh Hai Aashiqui	Prince Jeet Singh	Episode: "Didi Se Dhoka"	
2015	Yeh Hai Aashiqui	Abhishek	Episode: "The Driving Force"	
2015	Doli Armaano Ki	Chiku Gaurav Singh		
2015	Twist Wala Love	Aryan		
2016	Savdhaan India	Arjun		
2016	Pyaar Tune Kya Kiya	Ruzbeh	Season 6	
2016–2018	Ishqbaaaz	Omkara "Om" Singh Oberoi		
2017	Dil Boley Oberoi	Omkara "Om" Singh Oberoi		
2020	Pavitra Bhagya	Reyansh Khurana		
2020	Shakti – Astitva Ke Ehsaas Ki	Reyansh Khurana	Special appearance	
2021	Kyun Utthe Dil Chhod Aaye	Veer Pratapsingh		
2022	Muskuraane Ki Vajah Tum Ho	Kabir Singh Shekhawat		
2022	Saavi Ki Savaari	Kabir Singh Shekhawat	Special appearance	
2023	Durga Aur Charu	Anirban Banerjee		

=== Web series ===
Year	Title	Role	Notes	Ref.
2019	Silsila Badalte Rishton Ka	Ruhaan	Season 2	

=== Music videos ===
Year	Title	Singer	Ref.
2017	Pehla Pyaar	Shilpa Joshi	
2024	Boondhe Baarish Ki	Akhil Sachdeva	
2024	Zikr Tera	Naman Pareek, KavyaKriti	

== Awards and nominations ==
Year	Award	Category	Work	Result	Ref.
2017	Indian Television Academy Awards	Best Actor in a Supporting Role	Ishqbaaaz	Nominated	
2017	Gold Awards	Best Actor in a Supporting Role	Ishqbaaaz	Nominated	
2018	Gold Awards	Best Actor in a Supporting Role	Ishqbaaaz	Won	
2019	Indian Telly Awards		Ishqbaaaz	Won	
2019	Gold Awards	Best Actor Popular - OTT	Silsila Badalte Rishton Ka 2	Nominated	
2019	Gold Awards	Most Stylish Actor - OTT	—N/a	Won	

== See also ==
- List of Indian television actors
