= 36 Farmhouse =

- Official release poster
- Directed by: Ram Ramesh Sharma
- Written by: Subhash Ghai
- Produced by: Subhash Ghai
- Starring: Vijay Raaz; Sanjay Mishra; Amol Parashar
- Cinematography: Akhilesh Shrivastava
- Edited by: Shashank Mali; Anubhav Sarda
- Music by: Subhash Ghai
- Distributed by: ZEE5
- Release date: 21 January 2022
- Running time: 107 minutes
- Country: India
- Language: Hindi

36 Farmhouse is a 2022 Indian Hindi-language suspense comedy drama film. It is written by Subhash Ghai and directed by Ram Ramesh Sharma. It is produced by Subhash Ghai and Rahul Puri under the banner Mukta Searchlight Films and Zee Studios. It stars Amol Parashar, Barkha Singh, Vijay Raaz, Madhuri Bhatia, Sanjay Mishra and Flora Saini in pivotal roles. The film premiered on 21 January 2022 on ZEE5.

== Cast ==
- Vijay Raaz as Raunak Singh
- Madhuri Bhatia as Padmini Raj Singh
- Sanjay Mishra as Jai Prakash "JP"
- Amol Parashar as Harry Prakash, JP's son
- Ashwini Kalsekar as Benny
- Barkha Singh as Antara Raj Singh
- Flora Saini as Mithika Singh
- Rahul Singh as Gajendra Singh
- Pradeep Bajpai as Inspector Aditya Mane
- Liza Singh as Juhi
- Gaurav Ghatnekar as Advocate Kakkar

== Soundtrack ==
36 Farmhouse

Soundtrack album
- Released: 3 January 2022
- Recorded: 2021
- Genre: Feature film soundtrack
- Length: 7:51
- Language: Hindi
- Label: Zee Music Company
External audio
- Official Audio Jukebox on YouTube

Subhash Ghai has written the lyrics, and he is the score composer for both the songs.

Track listing
No.	Title	Lyrics	Singer(s)	Length
1.	"Mind Your Business"	Subhash Ghai	Hariharan	3:44
2.	"Mohabbat"	Subhash Ghai	Sonu Nigam	4:07
Total length:				7:51

== Release ==
ZEE5 announced the launch of a trailer on 12 January 2022, and the film was released on 21 January 2022.

== Reception ==
First Post has rated the movie as embarrassingly bad. Outlook India too had a similar review, stating that Subhash Ghai is still making the movies of the 1980s.

Umesh Upadhyay of Dainik Bhaskar has given 3.5 out of 5 stars stating that the film interestingly shows the title of thirty-six and the music of Subhash Ghai is also strong. Performance of Sanjay Mishra is good while Vijay Raaz's character Raunak Raj Singh looked weak. The dialogue writing has a big hand in it.

Archika Khurana of The Times of India has given 2.5 out of 5 stars stating that it is a family drama which is predictable and is a light-hearted to watch. It is based on the concept of 'some steal for need, some steal for greed,' with the farmhouse's inheritance serving as the focal point of the tale. Cinematography explores the property from all angles within the one farmhouse. Sanjay Mishra's makes JP character the most memorable and funny character while other roles were convincing. Overall, it is unhurried social commentary on greed, class disparity, family disputes and romance appear to be a half-baked effort.

Russel D'Silva of BollywoodLife.com has given 3 out of 5 stars stating that Subhash Ghai comes back to form in the OTT space with this Amol Parashar and Barkha Singh thriller. The writer and the director together they have shown a pretty decent thriller. It has boasts of some good twists and turns, with the climax especially standing out. The performances of Sanjay Mishra and Vijay Raaz rise above the script by their several notches. Overall, it is a good watch for a neat, smart and snappy thriller.
