= MTV Girls on Top =

- Created by: Palki Malhotra
- Directed by: Anirudh
- Creative director: Danish Mansuri
- Starring: See below
- Country of origin: India
- Original language: Hindi
- No. of seasons: 1
- No. of episodes: 120

Production
- Production locations: Mumbai, India
- Editors: Praveen Vishwakarma, Vinay Mandal, Sundip Singh
- Camera setup: Single-camera
- Running time: 22 minutes approx.
- Production company: BBC Worldwide Productions

Original release
- Network: MTV India
- Release: 7 March – 29 September 2016

MTV Girls on Top is an Indian Hindi Romance television series. It premiered on 7 March 2016. It was broadcast on MTV India and produced by BBC Worldwide Productions, airing Monday to Thursday nights. The final episode was broadcast on 29 September 2016.

The series highlighted challenges and issues women face in India. The three leading women navigate careers, love, and their responsibilities.

== Plot ==
The show follows the lives of three young women living together in Mumbai as they look to further their careers: Isha (a young TV producer), Gia (an aspiring broadcast journalist), and Revati (a DJ hoping to win an international DJ competition in Amsterdam). It showcases the various challenges they face while trying to elevate their careers, including their love lives, responsibilities and friendship.

== Cast ==
- Saloni Chopra as Isha Jaisingh
- Barkha Singh as Gia Sen
- Ayesha Adlakha as Revati Chauhan
- Ritwika Gupta as YouTuber Shalini who advises Isha
- Shantanu Maheshwari as Sahir Bhasin
- Yuvraj Thakur as Azhar Khan
- Arjun Singh as Guruvinder Singh
- Sana Sayyad as Megha
- Shruti Bapna as Diana (Gia's Boss)
- Shweta Padda as Marium Khan (Azhar's Mom)
- Krissann Barretto as Tapasya
- Macedon Dmello as Rossy
- Pranav Misshra as Shekhar
- Sneha Gupta as Mithali
- Priyanka Soni as Vrushali
