= Krissann Barretto =

Indian television actress and model

- Born: Mumbai, Maharashtra, India
- Occupations: Actress; model
- Years active: 2014–present
- Known for: Kaisi Yeh Yaariyan; Ace Of Space 2
- Spouse: Nathan Karamchandani (m. 2023)

Krissann Barretto is an Indian actress and model known for working in Hindi television and is best known for playing Alya Saxena in MTV's Kaisi Yeh Yaariaan and participating in the reality show Ace of Space 2 in which she became 4th runner up.

== Early life ==
Barretto attended the Apostolic Carmel High School in Bandra, Mumbai and St. Xavier's College, Mumbai. She then attended the Government Law College, Mumbai but dropped out to pursue a career in acting.

== Personal life ==
In April 2023, she got engaged to her boyfriend, Nathan Karamchandani. In October 2023, they got married.

== Career ==
Barretto started off her television career by acting in episodics like Heroes, The Fightback Files and Yeh Hai Aashiqui. She got her breakthrough in 2014 with MTV India's Kaisi Yeh Yaariyan where she portrayed Alya Saxena. In 2016, she played Kiya Kapoor in &TV's Kahani Hamari...Dil Dosti Deewanepan Ki and Tapasya in MTV India's Girls on Top. From 2016 to 2017, she played Romi in Star Plus's Ishqbaaaz.

In 2017, she made her digital debut playing Sarah in ALT Balaji's Class of 2017 and Payal in CyberSquad. From 2017 to 2018, she portrayed Sanjana Bhardwaj in Colors TV's Sasural Simar Ka. In 2018, she played Rangoli Rai in Tu Aashiqui. In 2019, Barretto participated in MTV India's Ace Of Space 2 where she finished as a fourth runner up. In June 2022, she participated in MTV India's reality show MTV Ex Or Next.

== Filmography ==
=== Film ===
Year	Film	Role
2025	Dil Dosti Aur Dogs	Shanaya Sanghvi

=== Television ===
Year	Show	Role	Notes	Ref
2014	Yeh Hai Aashiqui	Mona		
2014–2015	Kaisi Yeh Yaariaan	Alya Saxena		
2015	Warrior High	Alya Saxena		
2015	Pyaar Tune Kya Kiya 4	Raima		
2016	Pyaar Tune Kya Kiya 7	Rupali		
2016	Yeh Hai Aashiqui 4	Alisha		
2016	Kahani Hamari...Dil Dosti Deewanepan Ki	Kiya Kapoor		
2016	Girls on Top	Tapasya		
2016–2017	Ishqbaaaz	Romi		
2016	Y.A.R.O Ka Tashan	Shanaya		
2016	Pyaar Tune Kya Kiya 8	Lekha		
2017	Big F 2	Jhanvi		
2017–2018	Sasural Simar Ka	Sanjana Sameer Kapoor (née Bharadwaj)		
2018	Tu Aashiqui	Rangoli Rai		
2019	Laal Ishq	Tanya		
2019	Ace of Space 2	Contestant	4th runner up	
2022	MTV Ex Or Next	Contestant		
2023–2024	Pashminna – Dhaage Mohabbat Ke	Ayesha Sharma		
2024	Jubilee Talkies – Shohrat Shiddat Mohabbat	Ira Singhania		
2024	Reality Ranis of the Jungle	Contestant	Runner-Up	
2025	Udne Ki Aasha	Sonali		
2025	Chakravarti Samrat Prithviraj Chauhan	Haseena		

=== Web series ===
Year	Show	Role	Notes
2017	Class of 2017	Sarah	
2017	CyberSquad	Payal	
2022	Kaisi Yeh Yaariaan	Alya Saxena	
2023	Fuh se Fantasy	Lara	Episode 6: "Monsoon trek"
2024	Pyramid	Niharika	
