= 12/24 Karol Bagh =

Indian television drama series

- Genre: Drama, Comedy
- Created by: Sunshine Productions
- Written by: Vinay Chaudhury, Satyam Tripathi, Anshuman Sinha, Rajesh Dubey
- Directed by: Ravi Bhushan, Amit Malik, Sundeep Sharma & Lalit Moham Sharma
- Creative directors: Seema Sawhney And Sudhir Sharma, Richa Singh Gautam
- Starring: Neil Bhatt; Ravi Dubey; Smriti Kalra; Alka Amin; Hunar Hali; Manish Nawani; Sargun Mehta; Manit Joura
- Country of origin: India
- Original language: Hindi
- No. of seasons: 1
- No. of episodes: 253

Production
- Producer: Sudhir Sharma
- Camera setup: Multi-camera
- Running time: Approx. 24 minutes

Original release
- Network: Zee TV
- Release: 31 August 2009 – 22 October 2010

12/24 Karol Bagh is an Indian television family-drama series that aired on Zee TV set in the Karol Bagh area of Delhi. The series premiered on 31 August 2009. The series was directed by Ravi Bhushan shot in both Delhi and Mumbai studios. The story dealt with the conflicts between today's kids' generation and their parents. The series started the trend of TV serials being set in Delhi.

== Synopsis ==
12/24 Karol Bagh, Delhi is the address of the Sethi family. The head of the family is Mr. Rajinder Sethi who owns a shop selling bridal wear. He is a simple man who does not believe in God. His wife Manju Sethi is a practical woman who has a positive outlook towards life. Simi (Smriti Kalra), the eldest daughter, is 28 years of age and is still unmarried. The second child is Anuj (Waseem Mushtaq), who works in a bank. Anuj has a girlfriend but is waiting for his elder sister to get married. The third child is Neetu (Sargun Mehta) who is happy go lucky, extremely boisterous and whose only goal is to get married. And the youngest daughter is Mili (Hunar Hali), who is street smart, bold and realistic. The show revolves primarily around Simi and her marriage. Despite her sweet nature, she has been rejected several times owing to her weight. As the story progresses, it reflects upon the social stigma surrounding unmarried daughters through the struggles of the Sethi family.

== Cast ==
=== Main ===
- Smriti Kalra as Simran "Simi/Simo" Sethi Taneja: Rajinder and Manju's daughter, Anuj, Neetu and Mili's sister; Abhinav's wife
- Neil Bhatt as Abhinav "Abhi" Taneja: Anita's younger brother; Simi's husband
- Ravi Dubey as Omkar "Omi" Dagar, Neetu's husband
- Sargun Mehta as Neetu Sethi Dagar

=== Recurring ===
- Alka Amin as Manju Sethi: Rajinder's wife; Simi, Anuj, Neetu and Mili's mother
- Banwari Taneja as Rajinder Sethi: Manju's husband; Simi, Anuj, Neetu and Mili's father
- Hunar Hali as Mili Sethi
- Waseem Mushtaq as Anuj Sethi
- Devyani Shiv Bhatia as Anita Anuj Sethi (née Taneja)
- Indresh Malik as Rajeev Bhalla
- Yuri Suri as Mr. Harshvardhan Taneja, Anita's father
- Aparna Ghoshal as Mrs. Anusha Taneja, Anita's mother
- Sushil Tyagi as Mr. Surinder Sethi, Rajinder Sethi's younger brother.
- Manish Nawani as Nakul Singh Dagar
- Akshay Dogra as Vishal
- Manit Joura as Vicky

=== Guest ===
- Narendra Chanchal as Devotional Singer Special Appearance for Jagdamba, Maa Ambe "JAGRAATA" (Maha Episode No 30), (Episode No 31)
