= Teenz =

2024 film

- Theatrical release poster
- Directed by: Radhakrishnan Parthiban
- Written by: Radhakrishnan Parthiban
- Produced by: Ranjith Dhandapani; Caldwell Velnambi; Dr. Bala Swaminathan; Dr. Pinchi Srinivaasan; Radhakrishnan Parthiban
- Starring: Radhakrishnan Parthiban; Kritika Iyer; Prashitha Nazir; Deepesshwaran; Asmitha Mahadevan; Deepan; Amruutha; John Bosco; Udaipriyan; Vishrutha Shiv; Roshan; Sylvensten; Frankinsten; Rishe Rathnavel
- Cinematography: Gavemic U. Ary; Jaya Krishna Gummadi
- Edited by: R. Sudarshan
- Music by: D. Imman
- Production companies: Bioscope Dreams LLP; Akira Productions
- Release date: 12 July 2024
- Country: India
- Language: Tamil

Teenz is a 2024 Indian Tamil-language science fiction adventure thriller film directed by Radhakrishnan Parthiban. The film stars himself with 13 teenagers and is a centred around a spirited group of teenagers.

The soundtrack album and score were composed by D. Imman. The film was released on 12 July 2024.

== Plot ==
A group of 13 teenagers, consisting of 8 boys and 5 girls, plan to skip school and visit Nakshatra's grandmother, Kanagavalli's village. Nakshatra shares a mysteriously haunted tale about a 500-year-old well in her grandmother's village, piquing their interest. Intrigued, the group decides to visit Kanagavalli's village to explore the paranormal claims and prove their bravery as young adults. On Monday, 3 June 2024, the group of teenagers ditch school and embark on an adventure. They are joined by their friend Ayyankali, an orphan and poor classmate who is often ridiculed by his peers. However, the group boards a bus which is halted due to a roadblock caused by a protest against honour killings. The teenagers disembark and begin walking. Along the way, they encounter an auto-rickshaw driver who refuses to give them a ride, consume toddy, and one of them is bitten by a stray dog.

The school management soon realises that the students have skipped school, prompting a search while the frantic parents arrive and police begin the investigation. Some of them mock Ayyankali, calling him unlucky. However, Sara stands up for him. The group continues their journey, playing a blindfold game, when they discover Shaun is missing. Apoorva breaks down, blaming herself for his disappearance. Near a graveyard, they meet Thanikachalam, a drunkard, and misunderstand him for a ghost. Tragedy strikes again as Nafil, one of the twins, goes missing. His brother, Afil, in a fit of anger, injures himself. The tree they had rested earlier is now gone. They discover water from the ground, but their joy is short-lived as Nainika proposes to Adityan and then vanishes, leaving him distraught. Nakshatra's grandmother contacts her son, expressing concern that her granddaughter and friends have not arrived at the village as planned. Now, the police head towards the village only to be interrupted by another police interrogation related to Deepa's honour killing incident.

As the students venture into the forest, they spot a python, causing Afil to faint. Adityan fearing the python has swallowed Nainika, with his friends' help, they cut open the python's belly, only to find a live goat inside. A massive herd of cattle surrounds them, with birds flying above. This leads astrophysicist Jana to set out to the location, suspecting radiation signals from the golden disc they sent in 1977 through Voyager 2 from NASA and the presence of aliens. As the group faces more terror, Nishant goes missing, and an unknown signal is injected into his body, causing him to shrink and become trapped by an unknown force. Sarvesh discovers a rover device emitting signals and destroys it. On the way, Thanikachalam informs Jana that 10—15 children initially gathered, but now only 9 remain, as 4 have vanished, including an elephant. Apoorva becomes the next target, attacked by the signal, which causes her to shrink, and be abducted in a rover in front of her friends. Dylan becomes separated from the group.

Jana arrives just in time to join the remaining friends, and an alien spaceship appears before them, revealing the recent astronomical phenomenon and electromagnetic waves from Earth have converged, leading him to suspect disappearances at the focal point. He reveals the 153-year-old research and excitement at seeing the results. Jana notes that humans can't see the aliens, but they've established minimal communication through devices. The rovers collect updated Earth samples, including humans, trees, and animals, and transport them to the spaceship. Jana connects the spaceship's hologram with the DSS43 communication and explains that the spaceship's arrival is connected to the golden disc, which entered interstellar space in 2018 as the disc contained information about Earth. Jana decodes the message, revealing that only one sample from each species is required. Ayyankali volunteers to enter the spaceship to free his friends, and Jana inserts a chip into him before sending him into the spaceship.

A few days later, Ayyankali from the alien spaceship contacts the Earth through a video call, sharing his journey to the Alpha Centauri star system. The film concludes with Jana analysing samples from the broken rover, which forms the shape of Ayyankali, but refuses that he is Ayyankali but just an alien and reveals that Jana has already seen an alien in his bare eyes: the alien spaceship itself.

== Cast ==
- R. Parthiban as Jana, an astrophysicist
- B Krithika Iyer as Sara
- Prashitha Nazir as Teena
- Deepesshwaran as Adityan
- Asmitha Mahadevan as Nainika
- Deepan as Ayyankali
  - Pritvik Dev as young Ayyankali
- Amruutha as Nakshatra
- John Bosco as Sarvesh
- Udaipriyan as Nishanth
- Vishrutha Shiv as Apoorva
- Roshan as Shaun
- Sylvensten as Nafil
- Frankinsten as Afil
- Rishe Rathnavel as Dylan
- Bipin as Sethu Ramalingam
- Subiksha Krishnan as the police inspector
- Baba Bhaskar as a bus conductor
- Yogi Babu as Thanikachalam in a special appearance

== Music ==
Teenz

Soundtrack album by D. Imman
- Released: 6 April 2024
- Genre: Feature film soundtrack
- Length: 23:39
- Language: Tamil
- Label: Saregama

D. Imman chronology
Inga Naan Thaan Kingu (2024)	Teenz (2024)	Petta Rap (2024)

Singles from Mersal
- 1. "Icky Picky" Released: 6 July 2024; 2. "We are the Teenz" Released: 22 August 2024

The music is composed by D. Imman with his fourth overall collaboration with Parthiban after Maaveeran Kittu (2016), Podhuvaga Emmanasu Thangam (2017), and Yutha Satham (2022).

Track listing
No.	Title	Lyrics	Singer(s)	Length
1.	"Kaanaathathai Naan Kandeney"	Radhakrishnan Parthiban	Shreya Ghoshal	04:10
2.	"Hey Nainika"	Vaibhav Joshi	Shruti Haasan, Adithya RK	04:04
3.	"Bibli Bibli Bili Bili"	Arivu, Parthiban	D. Imman, Arivu, Key, Radhakrishnan Parthiban	04.11
4.	"Vaanamey Kaanomey"	Radhakrishnan Parthiban	Harish Sivaramakrishnan	03:54
5.	"Ikky Pikky"	Radhakrishnan Parthiban	Sunitha Sarathy, Christopher Stanley	03:10
6.	"Yesuvey Nee Pesuvey"	Radhakrishnan Parthiban	Nithyashree Venkataramanan	04:10
7.	"We Are The Teenz"	Radhakrishnan Parthiban	Janaki Easwar, Neha, Krishaang, Nanda, Ananyah	03:18

== Release ==
Prior to the film's release, Parthiban filed a case against Siva Prasad in Coimbatore after the delay of the film's graphic work. The film was eventually released alongside Indian 2 on 12 July 2024. Acknowledging it was a risk to release the film on the same day as the much higher-profile Indian 2, Parthiban nonetheless defended the move, saying it was to get more "visibility". After he liked a post praising the film and degrading Indian 2 on social media, Parthiban opened up and revealed that it was his manager who liked the post and not him.

== Reception ==
A critic from Cinema Express wrote that "The biggest takeaway of Teenz, perhaps, is the 13 teenagers. They are sincere in their performance and manage to keep us hooked with their innocent charm". A critic from The Times of India rated the film two out of five stars and stated that " As a film with teenagers as protagonists, the film tries to mellow things down, but in an instant switches gears to go full throttle". Ananda Vikatan wrote that new initiatives are to be appreciated, but it is a disappointment that this film, which is made up of teenage boys as an adventure trip, ends up being a boring trip.

== Accolades ==
Year	Award	Category	Recipient	Result	Ref.
2025	Ahmedabad International Film Festival	Best Director	Radhakrishnan Parthiban	Won	
2025	Ahmedabad International Film Festival	Best Feature Film	Radhakrishnan Parthiban	Won	
2025	Ahmedabad International Film Festival	Jury Mention Feature Film	Yogi Babu	Won	
2025	Ahmedabad International Film Festival	Best VFX	Alcon Ravi, M. Subramaniya	Won	
