= CyberSquad =

- Genre: Romance; Suspense
- Written by: Reshu Nath
- Directed by: Suyash Vadhavkar (Pilot); Abhay Chhabra
- Creative director: Nimisha Pandey
- Starring: See Below
- Theme music composer: Joel Pereira (Bass!c)
- Composers: Background Music; Ripul Sharma; George Joseph (composer)
- Country of origin: India
- Original languages: Hindi; English
- No. of seasons: 1
- No. of episodes: 10

Production
- Executive producers: Jyotin Kumar Srivastava (Inmuvi); Arya Gupta (ALT Balaji)
- Producer: Piyush Singh
- Editors: Sandeep Singh; Randhir Chandra Jha
- Camera setup: Multi-camera
- Running time: 18-46 minutes
- Production company: Inmuvi Entertainment Venture Pvt Ltd.

Original release
- Network: ALT Balaji
- Release: 24 August 2017

CyberSquad is a 2017 Hindi web series that premiered on 24 August 2017 on the video on demand platform ALTBalaji. The series revolves around the adventures of four friends who form their own Cyber Squad as they blur the lines between the online and offline worlds.

The series has been available for streaming on the ALT Balaji app and its associated websites since its release date.

== Plot ==
The series revolves around four friends, KD, Rocky, Uzi and Tia who are badass teenagers that help the police capture the most notorious criminals and hackers from their own secret cyber-den. They are young, smart and intelligent who use their high tech skills and arsenal of gizmos to make world a safer place.

== Cast ==
- Rohan Shah as Ketan
- Siddharth Sharma as Armaan Malhotra
- Jovita Jose as Tia
- Omkar Kulkarni as Rocky
- Roshan Preet as Uzi
- Jasmine Avasia as Bianca
- B. Santhanu as Bhonsle
- Prerna Wanvari as Sanjana
- Aarti Dave as Nirupa Desai
- Krissann Barretto as Payal
- Vivek Tandon as Gabbar
- Chaitanya as Little Rocky
- Sheetal Tiwari as Anjali
- Ambuja Naik as Isha
- Minoli Nandwana as Kaniska
- Sejal Vishvkarma as Little Sanjana
- Shonita Joshi as Sinha Ma'am

== Episodes ==
- Episode 1: I Spy
- Episode 2: Missing
- Episode 3: Money Transfer
- Episode 4: Monster Hunt
- Episode 5: Wedding Woes Part 1
- Episode 6: Wedding Woes Part 2
- Episode 7: Do No Harm
- Episode 8: Be My Valentine
- Episode 9: Hostage Part 1
- Episode 10: Hostage Part 2
