= Saloni Chopra =

Australian actress, model, and author

- Born: Saloni Chopra; Mumbai, India
- Other name: Tina
- Occupations: Actress, Model, Author
- Years active: 2013-present

Saloni Chopra is an Indian-born Australian actress, model, and author, who works in Hindi films and television. Her book Rescued by a Feminist: An Indian fairy tale of equality and other myths was released in December 2020. In 2018, she joined the Me Too movement (India) after making allegations of sexual harassment against Sajid Khan.

== Early life ==
Chopra was born in Mumbai, Maharashtra, India. As a child, she had an acting role in the film Prem Granth. She was raised by her maternal grandparents in Adelaide, Australia, and at the age of 18, returned to India. Her mother was a costume designer, and Chopra assisted her on film sets. She briefly attended the National Institute of Fashion Technology (NIFT).

== Career ==
Chopra was assistant director for Krrish 3 and Kick (2014 film). She has also worked as a stylist for Randeep Hooda. Her acting career continued with the 2013 short film Maya, screened at the Cannes Festival. She made her television debut on the 2016 show MTV Girls on Top as Isha Jaisingh. According to MensXP, "her turn on the MTV show Girls on Top in 2016 earned her a fan base of young women passionately relating to her words".

In 2016, she posted what The Indian Express described as a "bold photoshoot" and an "attempt at breaking stereotypes in the society and highlighting sensitive issues pertaining to women" on her Instagram account, followed by a five-part series of photos and essays. In 2018, she posted additional photos that India Today reported were created because Chopra "wanted women and men to celebrate their flaws as nobody is perfect".

She appeared in the 2018 Bollywood film Race 3 and in the 2018 television series Screwed Up. She also starred in the web series Waking Up With Maggie. As a model, she was featured in MensXP, on the November 2018 magazine cover and in a collection titled, "MeToo: Sona Mohapatra, Kubbra Sait & Saloni Chopra".

In December 2019, Reuters reported on Chopra's role as an "Instagram influencer" in a campaign to petition for "safe streets, helplines, justice and sensitive police" and "action from authorities, from local police to the prime minister" in response to brutal violence against women in India.

In December 2020, she published her book, Rescued by a Feminist: An Indian fairy tale of equality and other myths, a collection of essays on a variety of topics, including gender equality, violence against women, and social media, as well as anecdotes about her experiences.

== MeToo activism ==
On 11 October 2018, during the Me Too movement (India), Chopra publicly shared allegations of sexual harassment by director Sajid Khan from when she had worked as his assistant on the film Housefull 2, and allegations against director and producer Vikas Bahl. She also alleged that Zain Khan Durrani had physically abused her when they were in a relationship. After Saloni's allegations, actress Rachel White also made allegations against Sajid Khan, which led to him stepping down from directing the film Housefull 4. In response, Chopra publicly thanked her supporters, including Akshay Kumar, who had asked the Housefull 4 producers to "cancel the shoot until further investigation", and she expressed regret for not speaking out sooner. On 21 October 2018, The Times of India reported that Chopra "has not only spoken about her horrifying experiences but is also inspiring many others to do the same", and that Chopra "feels it is about time we started talking about it and addressed the sexism that exists in the industry".

In a November 2018, BuzzFeed News profile of the #MeToo movement in Bollywood, Chopra shared her story, including about how she "tried to warn people in the industry about Khan, but she told BuzzFeed News she was told to take it in her stride". In December 2018, after the Indian Film and Television Directors Association (IFTDA) announced that it was suspending Sajid Khan for a year due to the multiple sexual harassment allegations, including from journalist Karishma Upadhyay, Chopra stated, "For now, I'm glad for the decisions IFTDA has made, change must begin somewhere".

In 2018, Bhawana Bisht of SheThePeople described Chopra as one of the "significant pillars" of the #MeToo movement, because she "engaged in a powerfully honest and thought-provoking conversation about #MeToo and the cause they’re all fighting for". During a panel discussion, Chopra said she decided to publicly disclose her story because "It was time to practise what I preach. What is the point of speaking about women every day if I don't do what I stand for." Bisht reported that another panelist, general secretary of the Cine and Television Artists Association (CINTAA) Sushant Singh, was "aback by the fact that there were next to zero abusive messages he received while, on another side, these women survivors were being trolled consistently".

== Honors ==
- 2019 Editor's Panel Feminist Voice of the Year: Saloni Chopra (Cosmo India)

== Filmography ==
Year	Title	Role	Language	Notes
2018	Race 3		Hindi	

== Television series ==
Year	Series	OTT	Character
2016	MTV Girls on Top	MTV	Isha Jaisingh
2018	Screwed up		Maggy

== Works ==
- Chopra, Saloni (December 2020). Rescued by a Feminist: An Indian fairy tale of equality and other myths. Notion Press. ISBN 9781637453629.
