= Risshton Ki Dor =

Indian drama television series

- Promotional logo
- Created by: Sri ADhikari Brothers Television Network Ltd.
- Directed by: Gautam Adhikari
- Starring: see below
- Opening theme: "Risshton Ki Dor" by ???
- Country of origin: India
- Original language: Hindi
- No. of seasons: 1
- No. of episodes: 183

Production
- Executive producer: Tanveer ALam
- Producer: Gautam Adhikari & Markand Adhikari
- Production location: Mumbai
- Running time: approx. 24 minutes

Original release
- Network: Sony Entertainment Television
- Release: 15 May 2006 – 28 March 2007

Risshton Ki Dor (transl. Rope of the relationships) is a Hindi language soap opera that premiered on Sony TV channel based on the concept of human spirit and its emotions. The series premiered on 15 May 2006, and ended on 28 March 2007. The series was produced by Adhikari Brothers Limited and executive producer Tanveer Alam.

== Plot ==
The story is about a brother Suhas Abhayankar who struggles to keep his family united after the 'supposed' death of their parents. He promises his parents to take care of his 3 younger sisters: Shubhangi Abhayankar (elder sister), Tejaswini "Teju Abhayankar (middle sister) and Manasi Abhayankar (younger sister).

Tejaswini Abhayankar, the middle sister and the protagonist, is a young nurse who is studying medicine and falls in love with Rahul Raichand, a successful engineer. Circumstances lead to Tejaswini being forced to choose between her love for Rahul and the devotion she feels towards her elder brother Suhas.

== Cast ==
- Anuj Saxena as Suhas Abhayankar: Sharad's son; Shubhangi, Tejaswini and Manasi's elder brother; Niyonika's husband
- Urvashi Dholakia as Niyonika, Suhas' Wife
- Moonmoon Banerjee as A.C.P. Neha
- Sampada Vaze as Tejaswini "Teju" Abhayankar: Sharad's middle daughter; Suhas and Shubhangi's younger sister; Manasi's elder sister; Rahul's ex-fiancé
- Shital Thakkar as Shubhangi Abhayankar / Shubhangi Kunal Shah: Sharad's elder daughter; Suhas's younger sister; Tejaswini and Manasi's elder sister; Kunal's wife
- Monaz Mevawala as Manasi Abhayankar: Sharad's younger daughter; Suhas, Shubhangi and Tejaswini's younger sister
- Toral Rasputra as Shaina
- Gaurav Chanana / Amit Sarin as Rahul Raichand
- Jiten Lalwani as Kunal Shah
- Muskaan Mihani as Tara
- Ajaykumar Arya as Ronnie
- Ekta Sharma
- Raza Murad
- Anju Mahendru
- Aditi Ghorpade
- Yatin Karyekar as Sharad Abhayankar / Dr. Milind Kelkar: Suhas, Shubhangi, Tejaswini and Manasi's father
- Rishabh Shukla as Veerendrapratap Singh Rajput: A Business Man
- Rushad Rana
- Utkarsha Naik
- Shabnam Mishra
- Shrivallabh Vyas
