= The Buddy Project =

- Genre: Comedy; Drama; Teen
- Developed by: Sunshine productions
- Screenplay by: Nishikant Roy
- Story by: Saurabh George Swamy
- Directed by: Sunith Pillai, Amit D. Malik
- Starring: Fahad Ali; Bharti Kumar; Kunal Jaisingh; Palak Jain; Nikhil Mehta; Samridh Bawa; Manish Nawani; Manav Gohil
- Country of origin: India
- Original language: Hindi
- No. of seasons: 2
- No. of episodes: 420

Production
- Producers: Seema Sharma; Sudhir Sharma
- Editors: Satish Patil; Jaskaran
- Camera setup: Multi-camera
- Running time: Approx. 24 minutes
- Production company: Sunshine productions

Original release
- Network: Channel V India
- Release: 23 July 2012 – 24 April 2014

The Buddy Project is an Indian teen comedy drama series which aired on Channel V India from 23 July 2012 to 24 April 2014.

== Plot ==
The tale of eight mischievous students KD, Kiya, Ranveer, Panchi, Piddi, Samar, Juhi and Bobby. Their mischief crosses limits, and in an attempt to regain the lost pride of Royal Academy and help direct the enrolled students toward personal and academic development, the school principal brings in an old alumnus – Aniruddh Jaitley, who was once known as “Junglee” for his mischievous behaviour. He starts The Buddy Project.

The second season of the show focuses on how Ranveer, Panchi, KD, Kiya and Piddi adjust to the Imperial College of Communication after leaving their more familiar place at Royal Academy. Once best buddies, they have now turned into enemies all because of a simple misunderstanding. We can see some new characters in this season along with the old ones. Some new entries to the show are Avijeet "Avi" Roy, Superstar, Chandan Roy's son, a citizen of Imperial and the leader of the Dhakkan gang, and Omi Dahiya is the man who leads the Chillar gang. Both these gangs have great enmity towards each other and are often seen fighting. Some other new entries are Avi's mischievous sister, Avantika Roy, who has a crush on Aniruddh, and Ranveer's radio station partner, Rukmini Sharma, who struggles in college as she doesn't know the native language, English.

Slowly the buddies come together, clearing their misunderstandings. Finally, KD professes his love for Kiya, and she reciprocates.

Panchi, Avi and RV, Rukmini also love each other. There arise many misunderstandings between KD and Kiya, which get solved. Kiya's music video goes viral by a guy Joshua who likes Kiya. JJ organised a concert, especially for Kiya. Joshua warns Kiya to stay away from KD. Her show is a success. Joshua's true colours are revealed, and he is arrested.

College plans to elect a president in which RV and KD are nominated. This again raises misunderstandings between RV and KD. Avi frames Omi into booth capturing. RV is elected the president. KD's father falls ill, and the buddies (excluding RV) decide to put a dandiya fest in the college. It goes successfully, but KD's father's health worsens, and RV admits him to the hospital. RV and KD reconcile. On the rose day, Avi's plot is exposed in front of Panchi, and she breaks up with him. She then leaves for Delhi without informing, thereby upsetting RV. Ruku (Rukmini) is upset as RV doesn't give her time. Panchi comes making RV happy. Kiya wants to prove to KD that she can achieve anything and applies for an advertisement. Panchi starts a workshop for the poor, yet talented kids and RV and Ruku help her. Ruku organises a puppet show on the day of the workshop. Kiya's ad is out, but KD dislikes it. Panchi's workshop is a success. Piddi makes friends with Dean and his old aged friends and wins a camping trip. He takes the buddies so that Kisha (KD and Kiya)'s misunderstanding gets cleared and RV and Panchi realise their love for each other.

At the camp, Kisha reconcile. RV and Panchi get lost in the jungle and spend the night at the house of an astrologer. Everyone is looking for them. The next day, RV falls into quicksand while heading to the campsite, but Panchi saves him by pulling him out with a tree twig. Unable to express his gratefulness, RV ends up kissing Panchi, witnessed by piddi and Ruku.

The next day at college, Kiya says that she is going abroad for higher education, upsetting KD. He tried to stop her but in vain. KD later discovered that the music school Kiya was going to is fake. Meanwhile, RV and Panchi realise their love. Ruku leaves the college, and KD proves to Kiya that the academy was fake. On the new year, Panchi professes her love.

Then comes Harshvardhan Sisodia. He is a lookalike of Samar and is extremely arrogant. His life is in danger, and JJ is protecting him. JJ advises the buddies to befriend Harsh to which, they agree reluctantly. KD and Harsh develop hatred for each other due to Harsh's attraction towards Kiya. KD and Kiya plan to fake a breakup so that Kiya becomes more familiar with Harsh. JJ organises a football match between Harsh and KD. During the match, KD hurts his ankle due to Harsh. Panchi starts a mission, 'Kill Harsh With Kindness'. The next day, a few students tell RV to resign from the president post, so he does just for Harsh. Piddi also apologises to Harsh, and later Panchi is selected as the new president. A few miscreants kidnap JJ while he was trying to save Harsh. They threaten the buddies to give Harsh and take JJ. They set to Jodhpur. Panchi is kidnapped unknowingly by a girl called Sheeba. When Harsh learns about the buddies' plan, he runs but is caught by KD. RV finds Panchi and is delighted. Kiya does not want to hand Harsh over to the kidnappers. So KD makes a plan to save both Jaitley and Harsh. The plan is a success, but the kidnappers catch them and threaten to kill the buddies, but KD and Sheeba's cleverness escape. In this process KD and Harsh become friends. Sheeba also joins imperial.

The next day at college Sheeba's father tries to take Sheeba with him, but she reveals that she loves Piddi and wants to marry him. Her father agrees after a small test. The two are to be married the next day. Piddi hesitates to tell his mother about it. Then Sheeba comes and tells him that she is only marrying him for her freedom and will give him a divorce. Piddi worries as he was really in love with Sheeba. The two get married, Harsh leaves and then comes Valentine's Day. It goes well for all the three couples, and Piddi professes love for Sheeba, and she reciprocates.

Panchi decides to organise a fest called 'Impulse', and to do so; she had to unite the chillers and dhakkans.

For the investors, RV goes for the company of Maya Malhotra. JJ's school friend liked each other, but JJ wanted to start fresh and dumped Maya after JJ's patents expired. Maya is here to take revenge, but her plot is revealed. JJ tells the reason why he dumped her, and they reconcile. In this process, Kiya's mum accepts KD. Impulse was a success. Panchi gets a scholarship to a university abroad and decides to take the opportunity. This upsets RV, but he later agrees.

The rest of the show revolves on how RV, KD and Piddi start their career. The boys want to start a business. JJ and Maya advise them to help Maya's niece Vaani start a café. They agree reluctantly. The boys don't like how Vaani behaves. Slowly KD, Piddi and Sheeba get along with Vaani. Piddi gets a partnership in Vaani's café business. RV leaves town. Vaani develops an infatuation for KD. Once Vaani kisses KD on the cheek, which RV witnesses, he misunderstands that KD is cheating on Kiya. RV is annoyed with KD as he isn't taking their business seriously and is only concentrating on Vaani's café. But then they reconcile, and RV also gets along with Vaani. Meanwhile, JJ and Maya decide to get engaged and spend a year or two in America due to JJ's work. The show ends with the successful inauguration of Vaani's café.

== Cast ==
=== Season 1 ===
==== Main ====
- Fahad Ali as Keshav "KD" Desai, an angry young man, scholar of the school
- Bharati Kumar as Kiya Gujral, the diva of the school, singer
- Kunal Jaisingh as Ranveer Shergill, the Casanova, Panchi's best friend
- Palak Jain as Panchi Rastogi, the sweetest and most intelligent in the buddies, Ranveer's best friend
- Nikhil Mehta as Pratham "Piddi" Punj, the most dimwitted of the buddies, loves KD and treats him like an older brother, likes Bobby
- Chestha Bhagat as Babita "Bobby" Chaudhary, the tomboy of the gang, loves football
- Jatin Sharma as Samar Pratap Singh, the greatest mughal prince after Salim, likes Juhi
- Krishna Patel as Juhi Gupta, the gossip queen, likes Samar
- Manav Gohil as Aniruddh "Junglee" Jaitely, a former student of Royal whose tales of mischief have made him somewhat of a legend and a source of admiration for all the students, becomes a mentor to the buddies

==== Recurring ====
- Niharika Kareer as Ayesha, RV's ex-girlfriend
- Minal Mogam as Aanya Gujral, Kiya's self-centred elder sister who taunts and ridicules her
- Niyati Joshi as Mrs. Gujral, Aanya and Kiya's mother
- Shweta Gautam as Mrs. Rastogi, Panchi's mother
- Milind Pathak as Constable Ramakant Desai, KD's father
- Raja Sevak as Vice Principal Banga, The VP of Royal who hates the buddies
- Shishir Sharma as Principal Ramanujam, Principal of Royal who realises the buddies' potential
- Gargi Patel as Naina Ramanujam, Principal Ramanujam's wife

=== Season 2 ===
==== Main ====
- Kunal Jaisingh as Ranveer Shergill the Casanova, Panchi's best friend and love interest
- Palak Jain as Panchi Rastogi, the sweetest and most intelligent buddy, Rv's best friend and love interest
- Fahad Ali as Keshav "KD" Desai, the angry young man, Kiya's love interest
- Bharati Kumar as Kiya Gujral, the diva, brilliant singer, KD's love interest
- Nikhil Mehta as Pratham "Piddi" Punj, the funniest buddy, loves his 'KD bhai', Sheeba's husband
- Manav Gohil as Aniruddh "Junglee" Jaitely, a former student of Royal whose tales of mischief have made him somewhat of a legend and a source of admiration for all the students, becomes a mentor to the buddies

==== Recurring ====
- Sonal Vengurlekar as Rukmini Sharma, struggles as she doesn't know English, Rv's ex-girlfriend
- Samridh Bawa as Omi Dhaiya, leader of chillar gang, the desi guy, loves Panchi
- Manish Nawani as Avijeet "Avi" Roy, leader of dhakkan gang, son of superstar Chandan Roy, Panchi's ex-boyfriend.
- Priya Bathija as Maya Malhotra, investor for impulse, JJ' s fiancée
- Kanwar Dhillon as Kunal
- Jatin Sharma as Harshvardhan Sisodiya, the arrogant prince of Jodhpur and a look-alike of Samar who is disliked by the buddies
- Chandni Sandhu as Vaani, Maya's niece, likes KD
- Vikram Kocchar as Girish, a local gangster hired by Maya to instigate riots in the college
- Minal Mogam as Aanya Gujral, Kiya's self-centred elder sister who taunts and ridicules her
- Niyati Joshi as Mrs. Gujral, Aanya and Kiya's mother
- Shweta Gautam as Mrs. Rastogi, Panchi's mother
- Milind Pathak as Constable Ramakant Desai, KD's father
- Kanika Kotnala as Avantika Roy, Avi's mischievous sister, likes JJ
- Narendra Jha as Chandan Roy, father of Avantika and Avi
- Priyamvada Kant as Kamna, Kiya's friend who drugged and then tried to seduce KD
- Shrashti Maheshwari as Sheeba Patil, daughter of a powerful politician, later marries Piddi

== Writing ==
Producer Sudhir Sharma wanted the production team to relate to the ideas and thoughts of today's youth and wanted to work with people who could think the way today's youth does (the entire team is under thirty years of age). "We want to think the way today's youth is thinking. We are working with the people who can think the way today's youth thinks," said Sharma. Hence, the story of the show has been written by Saurabh George Swamy , The series was conceptualized by Anand Sivakumaran, who is also currently writing the story for Channel V's Suvreen Guggal – Topper of The Year and has earlier worked with Sunshine Productions on its successful TV series, Miley Jab Hum Tum.
