= Manish Nawani =

Indian television actor

- Born: 23 June 1988 (age 37); Delhi, India
- Occupation: Actor
- Years active: 2009-present
- Known for: The Buddy Project (season 2)

Manish Nawani (born 23 June 1988) is an Indian actor. He has acted in movies, TV series, advertisements for major brands, web series for ALT and APPLAUSE ENTERTAINMENT. He started his acting career with 12/24 Karol Bagh. He has also acted in The Buddy Project (season 2), Pukaar and Aahat (season 6). He worked in Gulmohar Grand.

== Filmography ==
=== Films ===
Year	Title	Notes
2011	Shuttlecock Boys	
	Perfect Narangi	

=== Television ===
Year	Title	Channel	Notes
2009	12/24 Karol Bagh	Zee TV	
2012–2014	The Buddy Project (season 2)	Channel V	
2015	Gulmohar Grand	STAR Plus	
2016	Aahat (season 6)	Sony TV	
2018	Pukaar	Life OK	

=== Web series ===
Year	Title	Platform	Notes
2019	Gandii Baat	ALTBalaji	
