= Yuvraj Thakur =

Indian actor

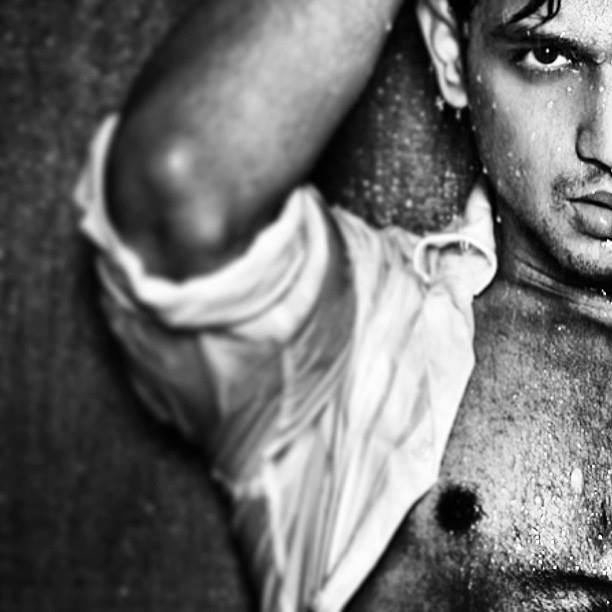
- Born: Delhi, India
- Citizenship: Indian
- Occupations: Actor, Model
- Years active: 2011–present
- Known for: Humse Hai Liife; Bade Achhe Lagte Hain; Girls on Top
- Height: 173 cm (5 ft 8 in)

Yuvraj Thakur is an Indian television actor, model and writer. He is best known for portraying the role of Arjun Thakur in Humse Hai Liife and as Sammy on Bade Achhe Lagte Hain. He has also appeared in shows like Gumrah: End of Innocence, Pyaar Tune Kya Kiya, and MTV Fanaah. He was last seen playing the role of Azhar Khan in the MTV show Girls on Top.

== Acting and modeling career ==
Thakur stepped into the modeling world by starting off as a commercial ad actor by working with an ad of Tata DoCoMo which turned out to be a big break for him. After starting with Tata Docomo, he appeared in several commercials such as Hero Maestro bikes, Horlicks, Vaseline Men's face wash with Shahid Kapoor, Vicco Shaving Cream and Renault cars.

Thakur started his acting career in 2011 by playing the role of Arjun Thakur in Humse Hai Liife. He has also acted in the teen drama Best Friends Forever? on Channel V India and Bade Achhe Lagte Hain on Sony Entertainment Television India. He has also worked in the MTV Show Kaisi Yeh Yaariyan as Madhyam Singania a.k.a. Maddy. In 2016, he bagged a lead role of Azhar Khan on MTV Show Girls on Top. Followed by appearing in an episode of MTV Big F as Zeeshan. In 2019, he was cast in a short film opposite Anupriya Goenka.

== Personal life ==
Thakur spends most of his time at the gym.

== Television ==
Year	Show	Role	Notes	
2011–2012	Humse Hai Liife	Arjun Thakur	Lead Role	Channel V
2012–2013	Best Friends Forever?	Varun Mittal	Lead Role	Channel V
2013–2014	Bade Achhe Lagte Hain	Samar Vikram Shergill a.k.a. Sammy	Lead Role	Sony Entertainment Television
2012	Gumrah End Of Innocence	Pranjal	Lead Role	Channel V
2013	Yeh Hai Aashiqui - Season 1 (Episode 1: Tasveer)	Tushar	Lead Role	Bindass
2014	Pyaar Tune Kya Kiya	Amar and Shikhar	Lead Role	Zing (TV channel)
2014–2015	MTV Fanaah	Anshuman/Sarthak	Lead Role	MTV India
2015	Kaisi Yeh Yaariyan	Madhyam Singania a.k.a. Maddy	Pivotal Role	MTV India
2015	Sun Yaar Try Maar	Samar	Episodic Role	Bindass
2016	Girls On Top	Azhar Khan	Lead Role	MTV India
2016	Pyaar Tune Kya Kiya	Trilok	Lead Role	Zing
2017	MTV Big F	Zeeshan	Episodic role	MTV India
2019	Untitled Film		Short film	Hamara Movies
