= Ishaan: Sapno Ko Awaaz De =

Teen drama created by Disney Channel India

- Genre: Teen sitcom
- Written by: Jaydeep Sarkar
- Directed by: Iqbal Rizvi
- Music by: Dhruv Ghanekar; R. Anandh
- Opening theme: "Sapno Ko Awaaz De"
- Country of origin: India
- Original language: Hindi
- No. of seasons: 2
- No. of episodes: 21

Production
- Running time: 25 minutes
- Production company: Red Chillies Idiot Box

Original release
- Network: Disney Channel India
- Release: 15 May 2010 – 27 March 2011

Ishaan: Sapno Ko Awaaz De is an Indian musical teen sitcom created by Red Chillies Idiot Box which aired on Disney Channel India from 15 May 2010 to 27 March 2011. It is a musical teen drama that focuses on a 15-year-old boy named Ishaan and the choices that he makes between music and his friends.

== Plot ==
Ishaan wants to be famous. Ishaan has to leave his school because of a fee paying problem and joins the school of which he won against the 'Karma Yatra' where everyone hates him. On the other hand, Kabir is thrown out as the lead singer of their band as he was trying to win the competition by offering bribes to the judges, and Ishaan, after becoming the friend of the band members, becomes the lead singer too. After rejecting the chance to be a solo superstar, Ishaan and his friends try to make it big on their own. The group soon learns that success comes with a price and with strong competition in the form of 'Baby Shasha'—the superstar! When faced with choices that could jeopardize his friendship with others, Ishaan makes the toughest decisions of his life. Ishaan also has a love interest, Shyla (Anisa Butt).

== Cast ==
- Tapasvi Mehta as Ishaan Sharma
- Anisa Butt as Shyla
- Kishan Savjani as Ron
- Sana Makbul as Sara
- Ayaz Ahmed as Pulkit
- Farhina Parvez as Munmun
- Rohan Shah as Mandy
- Nakul Roshan Sahdev as Kabir
- Sheena Bajaj Purohit as Himani
- Bharti Kumar as Twinkle
- Priyal Gor as Tara
- Nikita More as Lara
- Shruti Ulfat as Ishaan's mother
- Neville Bharucha as Sunny
- Deval Trivedi as Bubbles
- Rajeev Paul as Shyla's Father/ School Coach
- Darshan Soni as Supporting Actor
- Arshad Warsi as himself
- Shaan as himself

== Music ==
The Music album of the series was launched on 29 March 2011. Music was provided by Anand Ranganathan and lyrics were penned by Irfan Siddiqui and P. A. Sreekanth. The album consists of 10 songs including a special bonus track by Bappi Lahiri. Other than that there are total 25 songs.
