= Amit Sarin =

Indian television actor

- Born: Varanasi, Uttar Pradesh, India
- Education: Manipal Institute of Technology
- Occupation: Television actor
- Years active: 2003–2015

Amit Sarin is an Indian television actor. His first role was on Kkusum, followed by roles in Kyunki Saas Bhi Kabhi Bahu Thi, Risshton Ki Dor and Doli Saja Ke, Humse Hai Liife.

== Personal life ==
He was born in Varanasi, Uttar Pradesh, India. He now lives in the United States with his wife, Vineesha Arora-Sarin, and two kids.

== Career ==
Sarin has appeared in several Indian television series. From 2003 until 2005 he appeared in Kkusum. From 2004 until 2006 he was in Kyunki Saas Bhi Kabhi Bahu Thi, 2006 through 2007 in Risshton Ki Dor and in 2007 he was in Doli Saja Ke. In 2020, he was working on the film Between Mountains.

== Filmography ==
Year	Film	Role
	Between Mountains	

== Television ==
Year	Serial	Role	Channel
2003–2005	Kkusum	Kshitij Oberoi	Sony Entertainment Television
2004–2006	Kyunki Saas Bhi Kabhi Bahu Thi	Sahil Virani	Star Plus
2006–2007	Risshton Ki Dor	Rahul Raichand	Sony Entertainment Television
2007	Doli Saja Ke	Chaitanya Shekhawat	Sahara One
2012	Humse Hai Liife	Coach Karanveer	Channel V India
