= Jeena Isi Ka Naam Hai (film) =

- Theatrical release poster
- Directed by: Keshhav Panneriy
- Screenplay by: Amreetaa Roy; Keshhav Panneriy
- Story by: Purnima Mead
- Based on: A Little Heaven In Me by Purnima Mead
- Produced by: Purnima Mead; Stanton Mead
- Starring: Himansh Kohli; Manjari Fadnis; Arbaaz Khan; Prem Chopra; Ashutosh Rana
- Edited by: Keshhav Panneriy
- Music by: Deepak Agrawal; Harry Anand; OnkarMinhas; Visshoo Mukherjee; Siddhant Madhav
- Production company: Bibia Films Private Limited
- Release date: 3 March 2017
- Running time: 171 minutes (India); 150 minutes (International version)
- Country: India
- Language: Hindi

Jeena Isi Ka Naam Hai (transl. This is what life is about) is a 2017 Indian Drama film directed by Keshhav Panneriy. Starring Arbaaz Khan, Ashutosh Rana, Himansh Kohli, Supriya Pathak, Manjari Fadnis, Rati Agnihotri and Prem Chopra in the lead roles. It is produced by Purnima Mead under the banner Bibia Films Private Ltd. It was released on 3 March 2017. This film is based on the novel "A Little Heaven in Me" authored by Purnima Mead.

== Plot ==
The film opens with writer Alia Patrick (Manjari Fadnis) receiving an award at the White House. However, Alia receives bad news from India, and she hurries back to the country. Lakshmi (Supriya Pathak) has died.

The film flashes back to Alia's childhood. Her father, a factory worker, struggles to send his two sons and Alia to a good school. Alia focusses on her studies and writing and writes for the school paper. She meets Alex (Himansh Kohli), her first love, in college. She is sent to interview Kunwar Vikram Pratap Singh (Ashutosh Rana), the ruler of a former royal kingdom.

The prince is arrogant and misogynistic at first, but Alia quietly and firmly puts him in his place. The prince comes around and fancies Alia, but she despises him entirely. He sends expensive gifts to Alia's weak-willed father and asks her hand for marriage. She refuses the proposal, but her father forces her to accept it. Alia tearfully consents and bids Alex goodbye.

She enters the royal palace, where she quickly learns that her royal duties are limited to producing male children and presiding over the palace chores. She cannot leave the palace. In time she discovers that her husband, the prince, a drunk and a playboy, is brutal to the servants and abusive towards her. Alia's only solace is her handmaiden, Lakshmi. Lakshmi also manages the household and attends to grievances from the local townsfolk. One day the prince discovers Alia's journal, which chronicles her unhappy marriage, and has it burned. Alia faints from the shock. She is pregnant. The prince quietly instructs the head servant and the hospital staff to ‘do the needful’ (meaning kill the girl child). Alia is devastated. Lakshmi helps her flee from the palace and packs her off on a bus to Mumbai. It is a touching moment when Lakshmi gives her own jewels to Alia.

Alia arrives in Mumbai and follows a tea vendor boy to his orphanage. She starts teaching the children in the orphanage. Eventually, she applies for a writing job at a small magazine run by the eccentric Urdu lover Shaukat Mirza (Prem Chopra). Mirza believes in serious journalism and is sceptical of the young and wide-eyed Alia. Alia, however, walks through the slums and bylanes and draws upon her own struggles to produce a report, which impresses Mirza so much that he hires her on the spot. Alia gives birth to a baby girl.

She meets the wealthy NRI Aditya Kapoor (Arbaaz Khan) at one of his charity events and confronts him about the reporters at the event: is it about charity or about raising his public profile? She eventually discovers that he rings true; it is about charity, the reporters were incidental, and the charity is his way of reaching out to his parents, who both died a long time ago. Aditya asks her out, but she turns him away.

Mirza recommends Alia's work overseas, and she receives a job offer from a New York newspaper. She turns it down, as she does not want to leave Mirza, who has come to be a father figure to her. But when Kunwar Vikram Singh finds her in Mumbai, Alia realises she cannot be safe in India anymore. She signs over her share of the royal properties in exchange for a divorce. And she is forced to leave Mirza and her orphanage behind and go to New York.

Her life starts anew. She becomes engrossed in her work as a reporter. She meets Aditya Kapoor again at a party, where she muses about him. She volunteers for an assignment to cover the war in the Middle East. This is a grand success, and she is rewarded with a promotion. But her joy is short-lived when she discovers that her envious and spiteful female co-workers accuse her of sleeping with Aditya Kapoor (who, unbeknownst to her, is a trustee of the newspaper) to get the promotion. Horrified, she confronts him. He admits he had brought her to New York, but the promotion was her own effort. She says she wants to give it all up and return to India. At this juncture, Aditya admits that he loves her. He also forcefully says that running away is not fair to all the people – her school principal, Mirza, the New York paper, Lakshmi, and Aditya himself – who genuinely thought she was a good writer and helped her go forward. She realises Aditya's worth and decides to marry him.

The film ends as Alia cremates her beloved Lakshmi.

== Cast ==
- Arbaaz Khan as Aditya Kapoor, is a suave and successful NRI businessman based in USA. He is known to be a philanthropist and a person of footpath.
- Ashutosh Rana as Kunwar Vikram Pratap Singh, depicts the grandeur of a royal lineage and his lifestyle and attitude makes for an interesting perspective to the lives of royal families of Rajasthan.
- Himansh Kohli as Alex, is the quintessential lover who lights up the screen with his boy-next-door look. His optimism, grin and passionate love are his special charms.
- Manjari Fadnis as Alia Patrick / Aliya Vikram Pratap Singh, is a simple girl from a town in Rajasthan. With stars in eyes, she has the determination to achieve her dreams without compromising on her principle, making her character an inspiration for today's young women.
- Supriya Pathak as Laxmi, is an iron-willed lady who believes and practices woman empowerment. She is respected by one and all and is the voice of sanity in her village.
- Rati Agnihotri as Rajmata Pratibha Devi, is a strong woman, who heads the royal family. Her elegance and charisma make her the queen of hearts.
- Prem Chopra as Shaukat Ali Mirza ‘Karachiwale’, is the most interesting character of the film with a passion for books, Urdu poetry and philosophy. He is a veteran man of Urdu Literature, with a zest for wife and positive vibes.

== Soundtrack ==
Jeena Isi Ka Naam Hai

Soundtrack album by Bibia Films Private Limited
- Released: 15 February 2017
- Genre: Feature film Songs
- Length: 34:37
- Label: Zee Music Company

The music for the film is composed by Harry Anand, Onkar Minhas, Deepak Agrawal, Visshoo Mukherjee and Siddhant Madhav while background score is composed by Salil Amurte. The lyrics are penned by Deepak Agrawal, Asish Pandit, Kunwar Juneja, Mahesh Sharma and Fate Shergill.

No.	Title	Lyrics	Music	Singer(s)	Length
1.	"Jeena Isi Ka Naam Hai (Title Song)"	Deepak Agrawal	Deepak Agrawal	K.K.	5:24
2.	"Qubool Hai"	Asish Pandit	Visshoo Mukherjee	Ash King, Shilpa Rao	3:18
3.	"Mujhko Tere Ishq Mein Bhigade"	Kunwar Juneja	Harry Anand	Ankit Tiwari	4:49
4.	"Such ti Hoon"	Kunwar Juneja	Siddhant Madhav	Swati Sharma	5:45
5.	"Lattu"	Mahesh Sharma	Onkar Minhas	Akriti	5:29
6.	"Kaagaz Si Hai Zindagi"	Fateh Shergill	Onkar Minhas	Rani Hazarika Onkar Minhas, Uvie	4:51
7.	"Kaagaz Si Hai Zindagi (Slow Version)"	Fateh Shergill	Onkar Minhas	Nazim K Ali	4:51
Total length:					34:37
