= Baat Bann Gayi =

- Official poster
- Directed by: Shuja Ali
- Written by: Akshay Singh; Shuja Ali
- Story by: Syed Asif Jah
- Produced by: Sayed Asif Jah; Megha Agarwal
- Starring: Ali Fazal; Gulshan Grover; Anisa Butt; Amrita Raichand; Razak Khan; Akshay Singh
- Cinematography: Deepak Pandey
- Music by: Harpreet Singh; Ubaid Azam Azmi; A M Turaz; Rana
- Production companies: Jaypeeco Infotainment & ASR Media
- Release date: 11 October 2013
- Running time: 110 minutes
- Country: India
- Language: Hindi

Baat Bann Gayi (transl. It's final, then!) is a Hindi comedy film directed by Shuja Ali, presented by Vibhu Agarwal and produced by Sayed Asif Jah and Megha Agarwal. It features Ali Fazal, Gulshan Grover, Anisa Butt, Amrita Raichand, Razak Khan and Akshay Singh. It was filmed in Mumbai and Singapore.

== Plot ==
A successful author pretends to be a geek to impress his girlfriend's brother because he expects his brother-in-law to be intelligent. While the hero is almost on the verge of winning over his girl's bhaiya, his rowdy lookalike shows up, adding to the drama. Even the bhaiya has a lookalike, which doubles the drama and confusion.

== Cast ==
- Ali Fazal as Kabir / Khoka (Double role)
- Gulshan Grover as Prof. Laxmi Nivas
- Anisa Butt as Rachna
- Amrita Raichand as Sulochna
- Razak Khan as Carlos Rehbar Pasha
- Akshay Singh

== Soundtrack ==
No.	Title	Singer(s)	Length
1.	"Naseeba"	Ash King	3:54
2.	"Dance Karna"	Ash King, Sardar Ali Takkar	2:57
3.	"Man Tu Shudi"	Sonu Nigam	3:11
4.	"Bhago Mohan Pyare"	Nakash Aziz	2:59
5.	"Katto Rani"	Javed Ali, Meenal Jain	2:47

== Critical reception ==
Faheem Ruhani of India Today wrote, "There is so much confusion in this comedy of errors that the film's characters are mouthing lines such as "yeh kya ho raha hai, mujhe kuch samajh nahin aa raha, it's getting complicated." Exactly how you feel while watching Baat Bann Gayi! The end credits roll to say a film by Shuja Ali and team while you are thinking baat kuch bani nahi [Nothing really came of it]. The Times of India gave the film 1.5 out of 5, writing, "The major issue with this movie is the fact that it borrows heavily from films like Chupke Chupke, Gol Maal and Seeta Aur Geeta. Even if we ignore the lack of originality, the formula that worked in the 1970's looks way too outdated for today. Besides, those films had a solid script and some great comic timing. Here, barring Gulshan Grover, everyone else looks like they are trying too hard to make you laugh. Not their mistake. Blame it on the poor writing."
