= Aditi Paul =

Indian playback singer

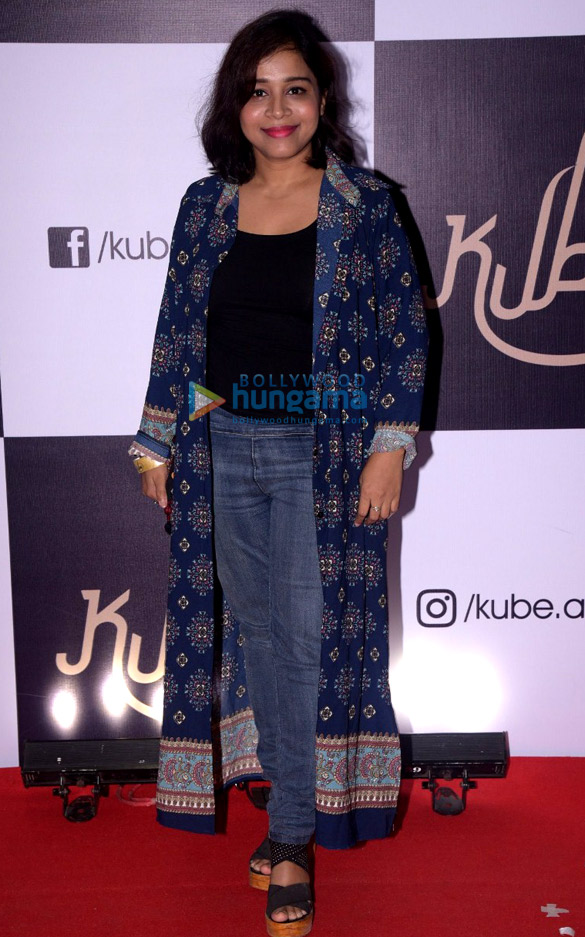
- Paul at the launch of ‘KUBE’ in Mumbai

Background information
- Born: Aditi Paul; 1 August 1979 (age 46); Kolkata, West Bengal, India
- Occupations: Indian Playback Singer; Live Performer
- Years active: 2004–present
- Website: https://aditipaul.in/
- Musical career
- Genres: Pop; filmi; classical; Rock
- Instrument: Vocals

Aditi Paul is an Indian playback singer. She is the playback voice behind the song Ang Laga De Re From the Hindi movie Goliyon Ki Raasleela Ram-Leela, Veeron ke Veer Aa from Baahubali 2: The Conclusion, En Kadhaal from Tamil film Vaaraayo Vennilaave, En Mannava (Tamil Version) and Vo Manmadhaa (Telugu Version) from Rajinikanth starrer multilingual film Lingaa under the music direction of A. R. Rahman, Beliya from the film Mehrunisa V Lub U (Duet With Armaan Malik), Nadaniyan Kar Jati Hain, Khwabon Ko Ankhon Mein and anha Tanha Ghum Ke Dhunde Dil (Duet with Jubin Nautiyal) from the film Dil Jo Na Keh Saka and many more. In the debut season of Indian Idol in 2004, Aditi Paul was among the top 10 leading participants. She performs Live regularly in India and Abroad with her band.
