= MTV Ex or Next =

Indian reality show

- Genre: Dating; Reality
- Starring: See below
- Original language: Hindi
- No. of seasons: 1
- No. of episodes: 8

Production
- Running time: 34 minutes

Original release
- Network: MTV India
- Release: 16 July – 7 August 2022

MTV Ex or Next is an Indian television reality show that aired on MTV India. It is an Indian adaptation of Ex on the Beach. It is a social experiment in which cast members abroad begin new relationships in the presence of their exes.

== Contestants ==
=== Season 1 ===
Episodes	Name	Hometown	Result	Post-Show Status	Episodes	Ex	Hometown	Result	Post-Show Status
8	Salman Zaidi	Hyderabad	Not in Love	Married	8	Krissann Barretto	Mumbai	Not in Love	Married
8	Samarthya Gupta	Jammu	Not in Love	Single	8	Nikita Bhamidipati	Mumbai	Not in Love	Single
8	Varun Verma	Delhi	In Love with Ex	Still in a Relationship	8	Saloni Sehra	Delhi	In Love with Ex	Still in a Relationship

== Episodes ==
=== Season 1 ===
Episode no.	Title	Air Date
1	The Reunion of a Lifetime	16 July 2022
2	It's a Dovie Fate!	17 July 2022
3	Hotties in the Volleyball Arena	23 July 2022
4	The Game Gets Abruptly Over	24 July 2022
5	Love Birds or Angry Birds?	30 July 2022
6	Varun-Saloni Start Afresh	31 July 2022
7	Love Game: In or Out?	6 August 2022
8	A Great Exes' Reunion!	7 August 2022
