= Fahad Ali =

Indian television actor

Ali Fahad is an Indian television actor best known for portraying Keshav Desai "KD" in The Buddy Project and Vivan in Yeh Rishta Kya Kehlata Hai. In 2018, he participated in MTV Splitsvilla. Ali made his web series debut with ALT Balaji's NSA in 2019.

== Career ==
Ali started his career in 2011 with the longest running show, Balika Vadhu. Later in the same year he played Tinnu in Chhoti Si Zindagi. In 2012, he acted in Zindagi Kahe - Smile Please opposite Additi Gupta. Ali made and episodic appearance in Ekta Kapoor's Gumrah: End of Innocence.

Ali rose to success when he bagged Channel V India's The Buddy Project where he portrayed the lead role of Keshav until 2014. In 2013, he played Mayank in Pavitra Bandhan. In 2014, he made and episodic appearance in Yeh Hai Aashiqui opposite Annie Gill. In 2015, he also acted in Pyaar Tune Kya Kiya as Arjun. He later played the main lead in Sony TV's Muh Boli Shaadi as Nikhil. The show ended on 19 June 2015. After the end of Muh Boli Shaadi, Ali joined Life OK's Jaane Kya Hoga Rama Re playing the role of Sunny.

In 2016, he entered Star Plus's longest running show, Yeh Rishta Kya Kehlata Hai as Vivan. In 2018, he participated in MTV Splitsvilla 11 as a celebrity contestant. He got eliminated in 6th place few weeks before the grand finale. In 2019, he appeared in &TV's Laal Ishq. He later appeared in Yeh Ishq Nahi Aasan along with Chetna Pande.

In 2020, he made his Bollywood web debut with Karan Johar's Guilty. He later joined Sony TV's Ek Duje Ke Vaaste 2 as Vikram.

== Television ==
Year	Show	Role	Notes	Ref(s)
2011	Balika Vadhu	Shravan		
2011	Chhoti Si Zindagi	Tinnu		
2012	Zindagi Kahe - Smile Please	Nimit Ajmera		
2012	Gumrah: End of Innocence	Honey	Episodic	
2012–2014	The Buddy Project	Keshav Desai "KD"		
2013	Pavitra Bandhan	Mayank		
2014	Yeh Hai Aashiqui	Sameer Bagga	Episodic	
2015	Pyaar Tune Kya Kiya	Arjun	Episodic	
2015	Muh Boli Shaadi	Nikhil		
2015–2016	Jaane Kya Hoga Rama Re	Shekhar		
2016	Yeh Rishta Kya Kehlata Hai	Vivan		
2018–2019	MTV Splitsvilla 11	Contestant		
2019	Laal Ishq	Bunty	Episodic	
2019	Yeh Ishq Nahi Aasan		Episodic	
2019	Zindagi Ke Crossroads		Episodic	
2020	Ek Duje Ke Vaaste 2	Vikram		
2023	Tere Ishq Mein Ghayal	Mahir Damania		

=== Web series ===
Year	Title	Role	Ref.
2019	NSA		

== Filmography ==
Year	Film	Character	Notes
2020	Guilty	Rahul Jha	Webmovie
