= Amrita Raichand =

Indian actress and celebrity chef

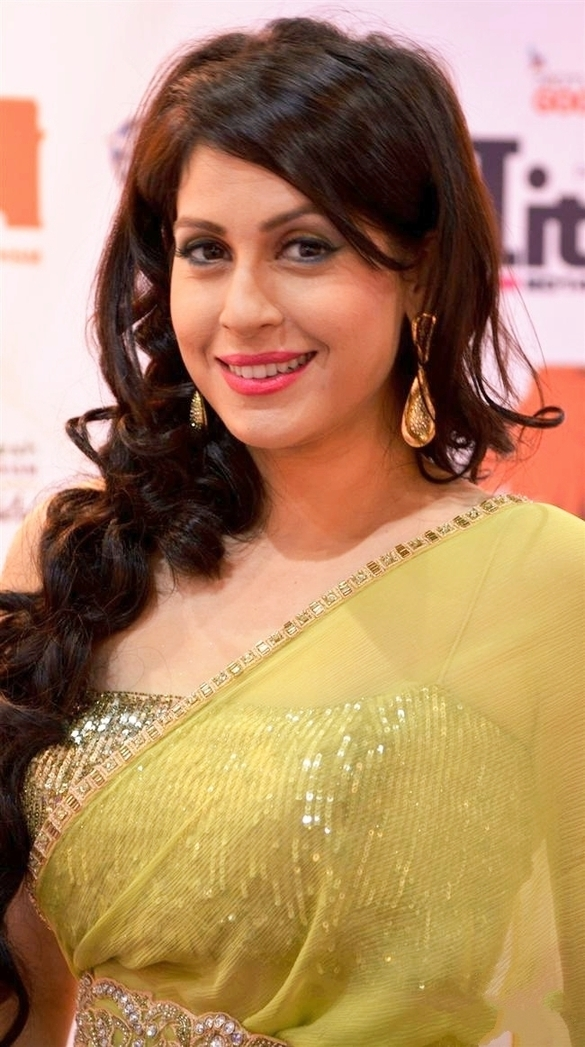
- Amrita Raichand in 2014
- Born: Dhanbad, Jharkhand
- Occupations: Actress, Chef
- Spouse: Rahul Raichand
- Children: 1

Amrita Raichand is an Indian actress and celebrity chef who appears in films and TV series.

== Acting career ==
She made her film debut with Humko Ishq Ne Mara, which released in 1997. The film was directed by Arjun Sablok and produced by Yash Chopra. Raichand has also starred in Baat Bann Gayi released on 11 October 2013, and worked in Kaanchi as third wife of Rishi Kapoor. She has worked in the Doordarshan music show Ek Se Badhkar Ek along with Mukul Dev. She was a judge on Punjab De SuperChef - Season 4, a Punjabi cooking reality show telecast on PTC Punjabi.

=== Other ventures ===
Amrita Raichand is also known as the host of Mummy Ka Magic which airs on the TV channel Food Food. In 2018 she was a judge along with Saransh Goila and Sanjeev Kapoor on India's Digital Chef.

== Filmography ==
=== Films ===
Year	Title	Role	Notes
2013	Baat Bann Gayi	Sulochna	
2011	Ready	Pooja Malhotra	
2009	Detective Naani	Priya Sinha	

=== Television ===
Year	Title	Role	Notes
1997	Humko Ishq Ne Mara	Anjala	Television film
2005	Time Bomb 9/11	Roma Awasthi	
2010	Mahi Way	Anjali Suri	
2019	Punjab De SuperChef (season 4)	Judge	Cooking show on PTC Punjanbi
