= Himansh Kohli =

Indian actor (born 1989)

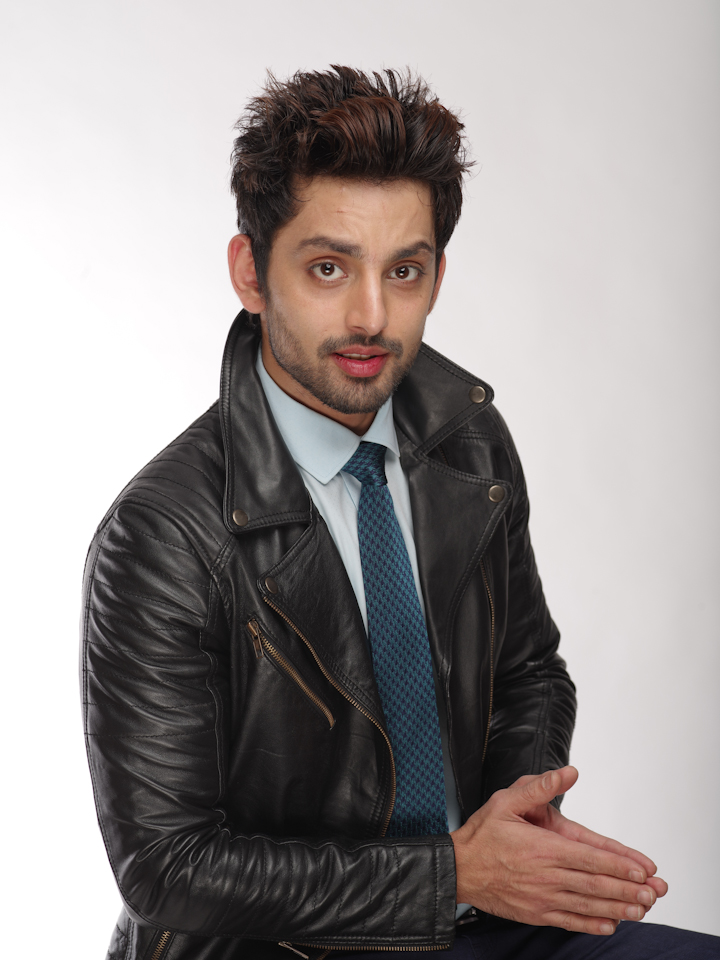
- Kohli in 2014
- Born: 3 November 1989 (age 36); Delhi, India
- Occupation: actor
- Spouse: Vini Kalra (m. 2024)

Himansh Kohli (born 3 November 1989) is an Indian actor from Delhi. He is best known for his role as Raghav Oberoi in the Hindi television serial Humse Hai Liife. He made his Bollywood debut with Yaariyaan in (2014).

== Biography ==
Kohli was born to father Vipin Kohli and mother Neeru Kohli and brought up in Delhi. Since his childhood he had been a big fan of Rajesh Khanna, drawing inspiration from him. Himansh Kohli married Vini Kalra in a temple in Delhi on November 12, 2024.

== Career ==
Kohli worked as a Radio Jockey (RJ) at Radio Mirchi in Delhi from May to July 2011. He made his debut on TV with Channel V's daily soap opera Humse Hai Liife. He played the character Raghav Oberoi, the male protagonist in Humse Hai Liife. He was on the show from 5 September 2011 to 12 June 2012, and left when he was given a role in a feature film. He came back to the show in November 2012 to shoot for the show's final episode.

In May 2012, director Divya Kumar cast Kohli as one of the lead actors for the Bollywood movieYaariyaan, to play the character Lakshya. The film which was released on 10 January 2014 became a box office success.

In 2017, Kohli appeared in four films: drama film Jeena Isi Ka Naam Hai directed by Keshhav Panneriy, romantic comedy Sweetiee Weds NRI, Ranchi Diaries, and Dil Jo Na Keh Saka.

== Filmography ==
=== Films ===
| Year | Title | Role | Notes | Ref. |
|---|---|---|---|---|
| 2014 | Yaariyan | Lakshya | | |
| 2017 | Jeena Isi Ka Naam Hai | Alex | | |
| 2017 | Sweetiee Weds NRI | Aakash Patel | | |
| 2017 | Ranchi Diaries | Manish | | |
| 2017 | Dil Jo Na Keh Saka | Jai | | |
| 2018 | Abhi Nahi Toh Kabhi Nahi | Gaurav | | |
| 2024 | Kahan Shuru Kahan Khatam | Gambhir | | |
| 2024 | Gahvara | Farhan | | |
| 2026 | Aryabhatt Ka Zero | Baggu | | |

=== Television ===
| Year | Title | Role | Ref. |
|---|---|---|---|
| 2011-2012 | Humse Hai Liife | Raghav Oberoi | |

=== Music videos ===
| Year | Title | Singer(s) | Ref. |
|---|---|---|---|
| 2018 | Oh Humsafar | Neha Kakkar, Tony Kakkar | |
| 2019 | Tera Shehar | Mohd. Kalam | |
| 2020 | Tenu Vekhi Jaavan | Asees Kaur, Shahid Mallya | |
| 2021 | Main Jis Bhulaa Du | Tulsi Kumar, Jubin Nautiyal | |
| 2021 | Wafa Na Raas Aayi | Jubin Nautiyal | |
| 2021 | Bewafa Tera Muskurana | Jubin Nautiyal | |
| 2021 | Dil Galti Kar Baitha Hai | Jubin Nautiyal | |
| 2021 | Chura Liya | Sachet–Parampara | |
| 2022 | Meri Tarah | Jubin Nautiyal, Payal Dev | |
| 2022 | Mast Nazron Se | Jubin Nautiyal | |
| 2023 | Daayein Baayein | Yasser Desai | |
| 2023 | Bhool Jaa | Arijit Singh | |
