= Humse Hai Liife =

Indian youth show

- Created by: Hitesh Kewalya
- Written by: Hitesh Kewalya
- Directed by: Gorky; Maan Singh
- Creative directors: Aapar Gupta, Ragini Shah
- Starring: Abigail Jain; Himansh Kohli; Yuvraj Thakur; Sheena Bajaj; Varun Kapoor; Amit Sarin
- Opening theme: Humse Hai Life Yaaron by Shraddha Thakur, Aditi Desai, Nushkia Bhatt, Jiya Manidha, Rohan Dhar, Nidhi Trivedi and Shruti Pathak
- Country of origin: India
- Original language: Hindi
- No. of seasons: 1
- No. of episodes: 260

Production
- Producers: Gul Khan; Nissar Parvez
- Running time: 26 minutes
- Production company: 4 Lions Films

Original release
- Network: Channel V India
- Release: 5 September 2011 – 30 November 2012

Humse Hai Liife (Life Is Because Of Us) is an Indian soap opera aimed at young audience, which aired on Channel V India. The show premiered on 5 September 2011 and ended on 30 November 2012. The show revolved around a girl's struggles in her life and her aim to become a boxer.

== Plot ==
The plot revolves around a middle-class girl Sia Dhillon, whose ambition in life is to become a boxer.

Sia lives in Adarsh Colony with her uncle and her brother Gautam or Gauti. She is also friends with local dealer Rangeela. Sia becomes famous around Mumbai when she slaps her former school's principal for wasting the prize money she won the school in a zonal boxing championship. Principal Shenoy and Coach Karanveer of the aristocratic Elite School notice her in the news. Karanveer requests the Principal to offer scholarships to less privileged but talented students as Sia's late father was also his mentor. He feels Elite needs good sports students like Sia.

The decision of Principal Shenoy is met with protests by the spoilt crowd at Elite, including Vishal Kapoor, Saloni Singhal, Tanya Malhotra. However, students like Arjun Thakur, Raghav Oberoi, Ambar and Akash Singh, and Sama Kapoor support the decision and welcome Sia, Gauti, Pooja, Gurpreet, and other scholarship students.

Raghav originally irks Sia a lot around school, teasing her to the extent of bullying her, while his best friend Arjun helps her with her tasks. Sia soon wins an intra-school boxing match and establishes herself as the boxing champion in Elite. However, Vishal and Saloni continue to bully Sia and Gauti.

Raghav also boxes under Karanveer and competes with Sia, only to lose due to her quick tactics. Meanwhile, Arjun develops a crush on Sia, while Raghav begins to fall in love with her. Their constant quarrelling becomes a subject of entertainment around the college, making Saloni jealous as she also has a crush on Raghav. Sia befriends Arjun and Sama, and eventually also Raghav as she starts falling for him. Gauti befriends Miloni, Saloni's sister, while Vishal and Bonny bully him into stealing and hiding, planned by Saloni.

Raghav plans to leave Elite soon as his mother is diagnosed with cancer, and Arjun helps him, and Sia confesses their feelings to each other before his farewell ceremony, just as their year for Class 11 closes.

At the station, a disheartened Sia runs into a happy-go-lucky boy Kabir, who joins Elite School. He acts too cheeky, but the gang soon includes him. He fights Sia for Karanveer's mentorship, and Sia qualifies for the Delhi Boxing Championship. An exchange student, Aliyah, enters Elite to report on Sia and her life as a boxer in a "man's world". She is also Kabir's childhood friend. Arjun falls in love with her but is afraid of confessing. Kabir motivates him to express his feelings to Aliyah.

Saloni targets Gauti and makes him steal some gadgets, which leads to Shenoy almost expelling the scholarship students before Arjun leads a protest in their support and manages to save them. Aliyah realises she and Arjun love each other and asks him out. Kabir starts to fall in love with Sia but is aware of her story with Raghav and plans to unite them. After almost six months, he succeeds in bringing him down to Elite, and Sia and Raghav unite in the same boxing ring where they fought for the first time. Raghav promises Sia they will get through life together, and he will not leave this time.

The show ends on a happy note, uniting Sia-Raghav, Arjun-Aliyah, Pooja-Vishal, Rangeela-Saloni, and Gurpreet-Sama, and looking forward to Sia's national boxing match.

== Characters ==
Abigail Jain as Sia Dhillon.Lead.A headstrong middle-class girl living in Adarsh Colony with her uncle and brother, she joins Elite School on a scholarship. She aspires to become a boxing champion like her father, and is mentored by Coach Karamveer, her father's student. She is good friends with Arjun, Raghav, and Sama at Elite, and later falls in love with Raghav. She qualifies for Delhi Boxing Championship and looks forward to her match as the show ends.

Himansh Kohli as Raghav Oberoi. He is one of the popular students at Elite, and was the boxing champion before Sia. His best friend and roommate is Arjun. He enjoys being liked by his female classmates, and often irritates Sia around school. He calls Sia 'Pushpa', and Arjun 'Juno'. He finds his family in friends as his parents don't give him much time. He leaves Elite when his mother is diagnosed with cancer, but returns to promise his love to Sia.

Yuvraj Thakur as Arjun Thakur. The head boy of Elite School, he is a sincere and helpful friend to everyone around him. His best friend is Raghav, who calls him 'Juno'. He befriends Sia and the other scholarship students and helps them adjust to Elite. He starts developing a crush for Sia, but wholeheartedly supports her and Raghav. Arjun motivates Raghav to confess his feelings to Sia before leaving Elite. He later falls in love with exchange student Aliyah.

Varun Kapoor as Kabir Lazarus. Karanveer's son, he lost his mother when he was an infant. He lives with his grandfather and joins Elite School some time before senior year out of spite. He is cheeky and everyone, except Saloni, initially dislikes him. He makes friends with everyone and starts falling for Sia, but helps her unite with Raghav when he hears about their story.

Sheena Bajaj as Aliyah Shenoy. An exchange student, Principal Shenoy's daughter, and Kabir's childhood friend, she comes to Elite to cover Sia's story as a female boxer. She is pretty and confident. She joins Arjun's protest for the scholarship students, and also ends up falling for him, after which she requests Principal Shenoy to extend her stay. She eventually proposes her love to Arjun.

Rohan Shah as Gautam 'Gauti' Dhillon. Sia's younger brother. He has a good knowledge of technology, and is a sincere boy. He respects Sia a lot and is willing to do anything for her. He joins her in Elite, and makes friends in Miloni Singhal, Ambar and Akash Singh, and Arjun. He is often bullied by Vishal and his sidekick Bonny as he is a timid boy. He immediately regrets his actions and on his friends'advice, disconnects from Vishal's circle. He loves Miloni, who also returns his affection.

- Ankur Nayyar / Amit Sarin as Coach Karanveer Lazarus. Kabir's father, Sia's coach, and her father's student, he aims to make Elite the top school for boxing. Raghav calls him 'Bulldog'. He left Kabir's mother when he was just born, to chase his ambition. He has a crush on Ms Sen but does not pursue her. He has a difficult relationship with Kabir, and a fatherly relation with Sia and Raghav, both of whom he mentors to excel in boxing.
- Heli Daruwala as Saloni Singhal. A formerly rich heir, she forms the girl gang Kool Kats Klub or 'K3' to snub all those they find inferior to her. She, along with Vishal, come up with different ideas to throw the scholarship and "less rich" students out of Elite School. She starts dating Vishal to fulfil her expenses once she finds out her father has gone bankrupt. Soon, he realises and breaks up with him. She grows humble around the end of the show and starts dating Rangeela, a friend of Sia's from Adarsh Colony.
- Rupesh Kataria as Vishal Kapoor. He is another snobbish elite at Elite School and constantly plans to demean those inferior than him, especially Sia and her brother Gauti. He has a crush on Saloni but realises she's using him and starts dating Pooja.

== Other characters ==
- Sunayana Fozdar as Shona Sen—She is the English teacher as well as the student counsellor at Elite. She is a very sweet person and always tries to solve problems. She is in love with Karamveer.
- Karan Arora as Gurmeet Iyer—Gurmeet is also a scholarship student at Elite. He is a very shy and studious person. He is very sincere, hard working and a science nerd. During the date night, he was Samma's date and loves her.
- Aditti Chopra as Samaa Kapoor—She is a very sweet rich girl. Like other girls from the "Kool Kats Klub" she does not follow Saloni's orders. During date night, Gurmeet was her date and now she is in love with Gurmeet. She is also a good friend of Sia and always helps her when she need it. She always wears a cool cap and is not as girly as the other Elite girls. She has her own way of life and is good buddy of Raghav. She also helps Sia in all tough times.
- Dimple Chawla as Tanya Malhotra (Tan)—She is a student from Elite. She is a good friend of Saloni. During date night she was Ambar and Akash's date. Presently she is in a relationship with Ambar-Akash. She sometimes stands with Saloni and be her friend and at other times she becomes a spy and spies Saloni. She left Saloni's company knowing her wrong intentions for Sia. She leaves Elite after her 11th standard.
- Anurag Sharma and Syed Shabahat Ali as Ambar and Akash—also known as "Wadda bro" and "Nikka bro" are the two jokers of Elite. These two are twin brothers and are inseparable. They always stick together and when anything happens in Elite they act like reporters and collect news from every student. They help Raghav in all his pranks. They initially were afraid of Sia because they think that Sia will punch them. In 11th they both fall in love with a girl named Tanya. They are good friends of Arjun and Raghav and later become good friends of Sia and Kabir as well.
- Vishakha Dugarh as Pooja Gupta—Pooja has come to Elite on Dramatics scholarship. She has been Sia's roommate and friend since beginning of 11th standard. She always lives in her dream world. She always ends up in making fun of herself. She likes Vishal and was his date at the date night. Vishal tries to exploit her weakness and uses her to get back to the gareebs to show their real place in the world. Sia thinks Pooja exposes herself vulnerably to people and that is the reason she gets taken advantage of. But Pooja is gullible and her biggest weakness is Elite boys and her desire to become a part of the cool and happening crowd of Elite. She wants to be like Saloni and is also a member of the Kool Kats Klub (K3). Vishal asks her to ensure that Sia has trouble in giving her 1st mid-term exam in 11th. As a result, her friendship with Sia gets destroyed after this incident. She is madly in love with Vishal but in 12th standard picnic she learns about him when he misbehaves with her and again becomes friends with Sia and Kabir. But in the 12th standard things improve and Vishal realises Pooja is his true love and comes back to her. Pooja is then selected for films when Vishal sends her an audio clipping of enacting a scene to his father Ronnie Kapoor.
- Bharati Kumar as Miloni Singhal—Miloni is Saloni's sister but totally opposite to her. She is Gautam's classmate. She is smart and an intelligent girl. All the boys in her class admire her. She thinks that boys consider themselves to be smart when they are actually not. She is gauti's good friend, the only boy which she finds who is worth for her friendship. She also warns Gauti about Vishal and is concerned for him. She reports each and every movement of Gautam to Sia who is worried about him. She was also a good friend of Raghav when he was in Elite. She leaves after completing her 9th standard.
- Vivek Pathak as Bonny—He is Vishal's sidekick. Even though Vishal gives him no special consideration, he obeys whatever cheap thing he asks him to do. He is like a 'stupid boy' throughout the story, who can't take a decision of his own. He is Gautam's and Miloni's classmate and he is the reason why Vishal is always updated about Gautam. He has a huge crush on Saloni's sister Miloni, which she isn't concerned about and dislikes the fact that Miloni likes to in Gauti's company.
- Puneet Tejwani as Keshav, Cafe Manager—Sia's cafe manager misunderstands Raghav to be Sia's boyfriend. Raghav and the manager are good friends. Raghav convinced him to become his father for the PTA meeting.
- Mihir Mishra as Arun Oberoi, Raghav's father
