= Gahvara =

Indian short film

- Directed by: Tariq Mohammad
- Written by: Tariq Mohammad
- Produced by: Neeru Kohli and Sudhanshu Kumar
- Starring: Himansh Kohli; Neeraj Sood; Priyanka Verma; Harbinder Kaur Babli
- Cinematography: Shailendra Sahu
- Edited by: Manoj Mishra
- Music by: Anurag Saikia
- Release date: 2023
- Country: India
- Language: Hindi

Gahvara is a 2023 Indian short film directed by Tariq Mohammad in his directorial debut and produced by Neeru Kohli and Sudhanshu Kumar. The film stars Himansh Kohli, Neeraj Sood, Priyanka Verma, and Harbinder Kaur Babli. It explores themes of loss, family, custom, and personal transformation, focusing on a young man fulfilling his grandmother's last wish. Gahvara premiered at the 29th Kolkata International Film Festival on 8 and 12 December 2023.

== Plot ==
Gahvara follows Farhan, a 25-year-old man, who undertakes the task of constructing a new funeral bier (referred to as a "gahvara") to honor his grandmother's final wish for her burial. This decision sparks conflict within his family, particularly with his mother, who questions the necessity of the bier. Farhan's obsession with fulfilling his grandmother's request strains his relationship with his girlfriend, Nargis, leading to tension during her visit. The narrative takes a tragic turn when Farhan learns of his father's unexpected death, plunging him into emotional turmoil. These events profoundly alter Farhan's perspective on life, weaving a story of grief, familial ties, and personal growth.

== Cast ==
- Himansh Kohli as Farhan
- Neeraj Sood
- Priyanka Verma
- Harbinder Kaur Babli

== Production ==
Gahvara marks the directorial debut of Tariq Mohammad, who previously worked as a screenwriter for Indian television series such as Kareena Kareena and feature films including Sweetie Weds NRI, Dil Hai Gray, Dear Dia, and Boondi Raita. Mohammad drew inspiration from his Indian Muslim cultural background, aiming to tell an authentic and realistic story rooted in his personal experiences.

== Release and reception ==
Gahvara was screened at the 29th Kolkata International Film Festival (KIFF) on 8 and 12 December 2023, as part of the festival's program running from 5 to 12 December. The film was promoted via a joint Instagram post by Happy Cow Films and Himansh Kohli, inviting audiences to attend the screenings.

== Themes and analysis ==
Gahvara addresses themes of grief, duty, and personal transformation within the context of Indian Muslim cultural practices. The construction of the funeral bier serves as a central metaphor for honoring tradition and navigating familial expectations. The film also explores the emotional toll of loss, particularly through Farhan's response to his father's death, and the strain it places on his relationships.
