= MTV Fanaah =

Indian television series

- Also known as: MTV Fanaah - An Impossible Love Story
- Genre: Romance; Thriller; Fantasy
- Created by: Vikas Gupta (producer)
- Written by: Aarzoo Farhadi; Koel Chaudhuri
- Directed by: Sunith, Jijjy Philip, Ashima Chibber,
- Country of origin: India
- Original language: Hindi
- No. of seasons: 2
- No. of episodes: 73

Production
- Producers: Akhauri P. Singha; Myleeta Aga
- Production locations: S.J. Studio, Mumbai
- Cinematography: Sahir Khan, Jesal Patel
- Editors: Santosh Singh, Munna Prajapati
- Camera setup: Multi-camera
- Running time: approx. 22 min
- Production company: BBC Worldwide

Original release
- Network: MTV India
- Release: 21 July 2014 – 22 January 2015

MTV Fanaah is an Indian thriller television miniseries broadcast by MTV India. It premiered on 21 July 2014. Produced by BBC Worldwide India, MTV Fanaah is about the complexities of a love story featuring supernatural entities such as vampires and werewolves. The second season of the show started airing on 25 October 2014 and ended on 22 January 2015

== Cast ==
- Ahsaas Channa as young Dhara
- Harsh Mehta as young Vivaan
- Chetna Pande as Dhara
- Karan Kundra as Vivaan
- Nakul Roshan Sahdev/Yuvraj Thakur as Anshuman
- Anita Hassanandani as Preet
- Vishal Gandhi as Adhrij
- Anupam Bhattacharya as Abhimanyu
- Rohan Shah as Adwik
- Aaradhna Uppal as Farida
- Sandit Tiwari as Vivan's Brother-in-law
- Nikita Sharma as Mahi
- Rithvik Dhanjani as Vidhyut
- Ratan Rajput as Iravati
- Chetna Pande as Avni
- Yuvraj Thakur as Sarthak
- Anita Hassanandani as Yamini
- Ayaz Ahmed as Ranbir
- Meghna Naidu as Meghna
- Pankhuri Awasthy Rode as Seher
- Mohit Abrol as Jo
- Scarlett Rose as Rose
- Ankit Patidar as Prateek

== Reception ==
A review gave the film 3 stars out of 5 and stated " It involves a very intriguing plot, which will indeed keep the viewers hooked. So if you are a fan of supernatural sagas, you should give it a watch. Also don't compare it with other supernatural shows from the West like The Vampire Diaries, Teen Wolf among many others coz if you do so, you will be disappointed."
