= Pyaar Tune Kya Kiya (TV series) =

Indian television drama series (2014-present)

- Written by: Sanjeev K Jha; Koel Chaudhuri
- Directed by: Hemant N MIshra
- Starring: Surbhi Jyoti; Parth Samthaan; Meiyang Chang; Siddharth Gupta; Karan Kundrra; Rohit Suchanti; Namish Taneja; Anita Hassanandani; Meghan Jadhav; Richa Mukherjee; Avinash Mukherjee; Karmveer Choudhary; Shivangi Joshi; Prince Narula; Kunal Jaisingh; Niyati Fatnani; Sumbul Touqeer; Jiya Shankar; Harsh Rajput
- Country of origin: India
- Original language: Hindi
- No. of seasons: 12
- No. of episodes: 229

Production
- Producer: Vikas Gupta
- Running time: 45 min
- Production company: Lost Boy Productions

Original release
- Network: Zing
- Release: 23 May 2014 – present

Pyaar Tune Kya Kiya (International Title: Love... What Have You Done?) is an Indian television drama series, which premiered on 23 May 2014 on Zing. The second season of the show was launched in September 2014, the third season was launched on 21 November 2014, the fourth season was launched on 17 April 2015, the fifth season was launched on 17 July 2015, the sixth season was launched on 2 October 2015, the seventh season was launched on 12 February 2016, the eighth season was launched on 1 July 2016 and the ninth season was launched on 18 November 2016 and ended on 27 October 2017. Season 11 was launched on 24 October 2020 and season 12 on 15 August 2021.

Season 1–4 were hosted by Surbhi Jyoti, Parth Samthaan and Meiyang Chang. Season 5 was hosted by Smriti Kalra, Season 6 by Karan Kundra, Season 7 by Siddharth Gupta and Niti Taylor, Season 8 was hosted by Arjit Taneja, Abhishek Mallik and Shaleen Malhotra and Season 9 was hosted by Prince Narula. The title song of the series is sung by Jubin Nautiyal.

Pyaar Tune Kya Kiya released its spin off titled Pyaar Pehli Baar in 2018 and Kareena Kapoor Khan promoted the show.

== Plot ==
Pyaar Tune Kya Kiya is a TV series, which presents different love stories inspired by the lives of Indian youth. The show narrates tragic love stories of youngsters and showcases how today's couples face various challenging situations, complications, complexities and confusion in order to understand the sentiment of love and the decisions they make in life. Each episode highlights the mistakes that youngsters make in their love life. It also has a social message in each episode.

== Series overview ==
| Seasons | Aired from | Episodes |
|---|---|---|
| 1 | 23 May 2014 - 22 August 2014 | 14 |
| 2 | 29 August 2014 - 14 November 2014 | 12 |
| 3 | 21 November 2014 - 10 April 2015 | 21 |
| 4 | 17 April 2015 - 10 July 2015 | 13 |
| 5 | 17 July 2015 - 19 September 2015 | 11 |
| 6 | 2 October 2015 - 29 January 2016 | 18 |
| 7 | 12 February 2016 - 24 June 2016 | 20 |
| 8 | 1 July 2016 - 11 November 2016 | 20 |
| 9 | 18 November 2016 - 17 November 2017 | 52 |
| 10 Pyaar Pehli Baar | 10 August 2018 - 2 November 2018 | 13 |
| 11 | 24 October 2020 - 31 January 2021 | 15 |
| 12 | 14 August 2021 - 20 November 2021 | 15 |
| 13 | 22 October 2022 - 14 January 2023 | 13 |

== Cast ==
=== Narrators ===
- Meiyang Chang (season 1–2)
- Surbhi Jyoti (season 2–3)
- Parth Samthaan (season 4–5)
- Smriti Kalra (season 4–5)
- Anita H Reddy
- Karan Kundrra (season 6)
- Niti Taylor as Vidhi (season 7)
- Siddharth Gupta as Akash/Sid (season 7)
- Abhishek Malik (season 8)
- Arjit Taneja (season 8)
- Shaleen Malhotra (season 8)
- Prince Narula (season 9)

=== Episode cast ===
- S01 E01 Ayaz Ahmed as Siddharth Rawat, Chetna Pande as Piyali and Parth Samthaan as Gaurav
- S01 E02 Abigail Jain as Niti, Anshuman Malhotra as Ansh and Mrinal Dutt as Harsh
- S01 E03 Charlie Chauhan as Maya, Shakti Arora as Avinash, Kajal Pisal as Priya and Baby Farida as Maya's Grandmother
- S01 E06 Rohit Khandelwal as Chris
- S01 E07 Meghan Jadhav As Shankar, Richa Mukherjee as Shivani and Suyyash Kumar as Dhananjay
- S01 E09 Sehban Azim as Karan and Puja Sharma as Simran
- S01 E10 Shrishti Ganguly Rindani as Deepti and Lavin Gothi as Rohit
- S01 E11 Priyal Gor as Zohra and Paras Arora as Sumer
- S01 E12 Nikita Sharma as Koyal
- S01 E13 Shravan Reddy as Rohan, Megha Gupta as Riddhima Sahni and Aashish Kaul as Rohan's Father
- S01 E14 Namish Taneja as Sid and (Siddhi Karwa) as Alia
- S02 E01 Neha Sargam as Priya and (Ankit Raizada) as Rahul
- S02 E02 Adhish Khanna as Abhay and Fenil Umrigar as Rhea
- S02 E03 Ahsaas Channa as Manisha and Harsh Mehta as Suraj
- S02 E05 Karishma Sharma as Suheena, Yuvraj Thakur as Amar and Vikas Grover as Ranvijay
- S02 E12 Aditya Singh Rajput as Vasu and Neha Saxena as Amruta
- S03 E04 Harsh Rajput as Prashant
- S03 E06 Ashita Zaveri as Komal and Zaan Khan as Rohan
- S03 E12 Shilpa Saklani as Aparna
- S04 E02 Sheena Lakhani
- S04 E03 Harsh Rajput as Raghav
- S04 E04 Krissann Barretto as Raima
- S04 E13 Kanchi Singh as Veebha and Rohit Suchanti as Dhruv
- S05 E06 Samridh Bawa as Manjot
- S05 E08 Rohit Suchanti as Vikram
- S06 E05 Mahima Makwana as Mandira
- S06 E06 Ashish Dixit as Sanjay Mishra
- S06 E07 Akash Gill as Mahir and Aashish Kaul as Mahir's Father
- S06 E08 Amit Tandon as Professor Akash
- S06 E09 Kanwar Dhillon as Lucky
- S06 E14 Mohsin Khan as Suraj
- S06 E19 Rohit Khandelwal as Sreedhar
- S07 E02 Paras Chhabra as Aryaman
- S07 E04 Aneri Vajani as Arushi
- S07 E09 Chitrashi Rawat as Rhea and Avinash Mukherjee as Ayush
- S07 E11 Shivangi Joshi as Jyothi and Shagun Pandey as Raju
- S07 E14 Mohsin Khan as Girish
- S07 E16 Subha Rajput as Aashna and Rohit Suchanti as Abhay
- S08 E04 Priyank Sharma as Shaan
- S08 E06 Mansi Srivastava as Suhana
- S08 E17 Utkarsh Gupta as Jaideep
- S08 Roop Durgapal as Sharmishtha
- S08 Poorti Arya
- S09 E17 Alice Kaushik as Meera
- S09 E01 Niyati Fatnani as Shazia
- S09 E02 Parveen Kaur as Harpreet
- S09 E04 Aparna Mishra as Sahiba and Shagun Pandey as Mirzya
- S09 E05 Nikhil Khurana
- S09 E09 Rohit Suchanti as Rajveer
- S09 E10 Priyank Sharma as Surjit
- S09 E27 Vishal Bhardwaj (actor) and Radhika Bangia as Ruhi
- S09 E31 Ankit Modgil as Atul Mishra, Anjali Priya as Sargam and Sumbul Touqeer as Silky
- S09 E41 Avinash Mishra as Kabir and Jiya Shankar as Nancy
- S09 E43 Priyanka Verma as Biker Girl Disha
- S10 E06 Sandesh Gour as Vishwa and Ketki Kadam as Vaidehi
- S11 E02 Eisha Singh as Preet
- S11 E10 Raquib Arshad as Satvik
- S11 E14 Shagun Pandey as Sudhish
- S13 E01 Sohil Singh Jhuti as Neil
- Ritwika Gupta as Amisha
- Megha Gupta as Professor
- Pooja Sharma as Simran
- Randeep Rai as Mohit
- Manali (in an episodic role)
- Nikki Sharma as Niharika (in an episodic role)
- Sonam Lamba as Suman
- Kunal Jaisingh
- Trishal Kumar
- Avinash Mukherjee
- Puru Chibber as Chandu
- Shakti Arora
- Neha Saxena
- Anshuman Malhotra
- Bharati Kumar
- Ankit Modgil
- Ahsaas Channa
- Ruby Kakar
- Harshad Arora
- Kanan Malhotra
- Kiran Srinivas
- Kinshuk Vaidya
- Sheena Bajaj
- Buneet Kapoor as Krishav
- Sanaya Pithawalia
- Ashish Chanchlani
