= Krishna (2006 film) =

2006 Indian animated film

Krishna ...Aayo Natkhat Nandlal
- Directed by: Aman Khan
- Produced by: Shashikant Chheda
- Starring: Alisha Chinai; Sunidhi Chauhan; Rajendra Shiv; Kumar Sanu; Sukhvinder Singh; Sonu Nigam; Kailash Kher
- Edited by: Fazal Husein
- Music by: Bapi – Tutul; Rajendra Shiv
- Production company: Shethia Audio Video Pvt. Ltd.
- Release date: 29 September 2006
- Running time: 99 minutes
- Country: India
- Language: Hindi

Krishna ...Aayo Natkhat Nandlal is a 2006 Indian animated feature faith film based upon Lord Vishnu's eighth incarnation Krishna's epic childhood tales from his birth to him slaying his evil uncle Kans. It is the first Hindi computer-animated film based on Hindu faith of Krishna, one of the most reverred deity in Hinduism and was theatrically released in India on 29 September 2006. The animation for the film is done by Media Solutionz.

== Plot ==
Tortured by the atrocities of Kans, the evil king of Mathura on her residents, Prithvi requests Brahma to help her who asks her to take help of Lord Vishnu, who in turn assures her to take his eighth incarnation soon to end atrocities of Kans and other evils.

Kans gets his sister Devaki married to Yadava chief Vasudeva. However a celestial prophecy warns him that the couple's eighth child will be his kaal and end his atrocities. An enraged Kans tries to kill Devaki but Vasudeva assures him to handover his all children to him. Kans now imprisons the couple and kills their six children. During seventh pregnancy Vishnu asks Yogamaya to transfer the foetus of Devaki to Vasudeva's first wife Rohini's womb who lives in Gokul as the seventh child is incarnation of the serpent king Sheshnaag, the divine bed of Vishnu. Everyone assumes Devaki had her miscarriage for seventh pregnancy. Soon she gets pregnant with her eighth child and gives birth to a son, the eighth incarnation of Vishnu.

Vasudeva exchanges the baby with his cousin and Rohini's protector and chief of Gokul Nanda and Yashoda's baby girl born in same hours on Vishnu's orders aided by Vishnu himself in Gokul and presents the girl to Kans who turns out Yogamaya and she warns him about the baby being safe. In Gokul the brothers are named- Balarama and Krishna and raised together by Rohini, Nanda and Yashoda. A fearful Kans starts sending his demons to Gokul to kill Krishna starting from a demoness Putana and all of them attends salvation from Krishna's hands. With time Krishna along with his family and Gokul residents moves to Vrindavan.

It also showcases several leelas of Krishna like Yamuna lowering her water level after touching his feet, him protecting whole Gokul-Vrindavan by giving them shelter under Govardhan hill while trying to teach Indra a lesson, Kaliya Naag getting defeated by him in Yamuna, Krishna and his friends stealing butter from cowherd women's homes, Krishna being darling of Nanda-Yashoda and whole Gokul-Vrindavan, Yashoda fainting after seeing whole universe in his little mouth while punishing him, etc. He also do Raslila with Radha and Gopis in Vrindavan. Soon time arrives for Krishna to kill Kans as predicted and Balarama and Krishna move back to Mathura. There they kills several of Kans's demons and finally Kans attends salvation at Krishna's hands and the brothers rescues, frees and reunites with their parents.

== Cast ==
- Anupam Shyam
- Sanjeev Jaiswal
- Meena Naithani
- Nawazuddin
- Shiv Banerjee
- Noni Kaur
- Mamta Gadhewal
- Hemant Mahour
- Kalika Vatnani
- Mehtab Verma
- Goldie Verma
- Aman Khan
- Rajeshwari Sachdev Badola
- Varun Badola
- Nitu Chaudhry

== Music ==
1. Aao Padhare Krishna – Sukhwinder Singh
2. Aayo Nathkhat Nandlala – Alisha Chinoy, Anupam Amod, Carol
3. Baat Hai Yeh To – Sonu Nigam
4. Brindavan – Rajendra Shiv
5. Brindavan Dandiya Mix – Rajendra Shiv
6. Krishna Kaal – Kailash Kher
7. Krishna Theme – Instrumental
8. Makhan Koi – Kumar Sanu
9. Makhan Koi v2 – Kumar Sanu, Sunidhi Chauhan
10. Nathkhat Nandlala (Remix) – N/A

== Reception ==
Taran Adarsh of IndiaFM gave the film 2 out of 5, calling it an "average animated film." He further wrote, "Lord Krishna's story has inspired generations. In this animation movie, a number of sequences are deftly handled, especially in the second hour. The music is also tuneful and the simple wordings are easy to grasp. However, the background score could've been more effective. The voiceovers are in sync." Priyanka Jain of Rediff.com gave the film 1 out of 5, writing, "A story which had the potential to entertain and inspire everyone, ends up doing nothing of the sort."

== See also ==
- List of animated feature-length films
- List of indian animated feature films
