= Yasodha Krishna =

- Directed by: C. S. Rao
- Written by: Arudra
- Produced by: Mahija Prakasa Rao
- Starring: S. V. Ranga Rao; Jamuna; Baby Rohini; Baby Sridevi; Ramakrishna; Gummadi; Krishna Kumari; S. Varalakshmi
- Cinematography: G. K. Ramu
- Edited by: R. Surendranath Reddy
- Music by: S. Rajeswara Rao
- Production companies: Premier Studios, Mysore
- Release date: 20 January 1975
- Country: India
- Language: Telugu

Yasodha Krishna is a 1975 Indian Telugu-language film directed by C. S. Rao. The film features Baby Sridevi and Baby Rohini portraying young Lord Krishna, with the latter making her on-screen debut as a child artiste at the age of five. The film also stars Jamuna as Yasodha and S. V. Ranga Rao as Kamsa. Yasodha Krishna was later dubbed into Kannada under the same title. Notably, this film marked the final appearance of S. V. Ranga Rao, as it was released a year after his death, following the earlier release of his last Tamil film Sivakamiyin Selvan (1974).

== Plot ==
The film depicts key events in the life of Hindu deity Krishna, beginning with the marriage of his parents, Devaki and Vasudeva, followed by his birth, his childhood divine plays (Krishna Leelalu) and his ultimate defeat and killing of Kamsa.

== Cast ==
- Jamuna as Yasodha
- S.V. Ranga Rao as Kamsa
- Baby Rohini as Child Lord Krishna
- Baby Sridevi as Young Lord Krishna
- Ramakrishna as Lord Krishna
- S. Varalakshmi
- Gummadi as Nanda
- Sridhar as Vasudeva
- Krishna Kumari as Devaki
- Mikkilineni as Ugrasena
- Chandra Mohan as Narada
- Manju Bhargavi as dancer
- Rajanala Kaleswara Rao as Indra
- Arja Janardhana Rao

== Soundtrack ==
The music was composed by S. Rajeswara Rao.

- "Anna Chamimpu Manna" (Singer: P. Susheela)
- "Chakkani vaaDe bhale Takkari vaaDe" (Singer: Ghantasala)
- "Kalayo Vaishanava Mayayo" (Singer: P. Susheela)
- "Kalyaana Vaibhogame Ilalo Kannula Vaikuntamu" (Singers: P. Susheela, B. Vasantha)
- "Manasu Doche Doravu Neeve" (Singers: P. Susheela and B.Vasantha chorus )
- "Nallani Vaadu Padma Nayanammula Vaadu" (Singers: P. Susheela, B. Vasantha)
- "Nela Moodu Vaanalu Nilichi Kuriseyi" (Singers: V. Ramakrishna, B. Vasantha)
- "Nomu Pandindi Maa Nomu Pandindi" (Singer: P. Susheela)
- "Oogindi Nalo Ananda Dola" (Singers: P. Susheela, B. Vasantha)
- "Paaliya Vachina Padathi Pootana" (Singers: Madhavapeddi Satyam and P. Susheela)
- "Ponnalu Virise Velalo Vennela Kuruse Relalo" (Singers: P.Susheela and Vijayalaxmi Sharma)
- "Sarasarammulu Gadiche" - P. Susheela
- "Srungara Vathulara Siggela" (Singer: P. Susheela)

== Reception ==
Reviewing the Tamil-dubbed version, Kousikan of Kalki appreciated the photography, colour and music.
