= Kalanemi =

Asura in Hinduism

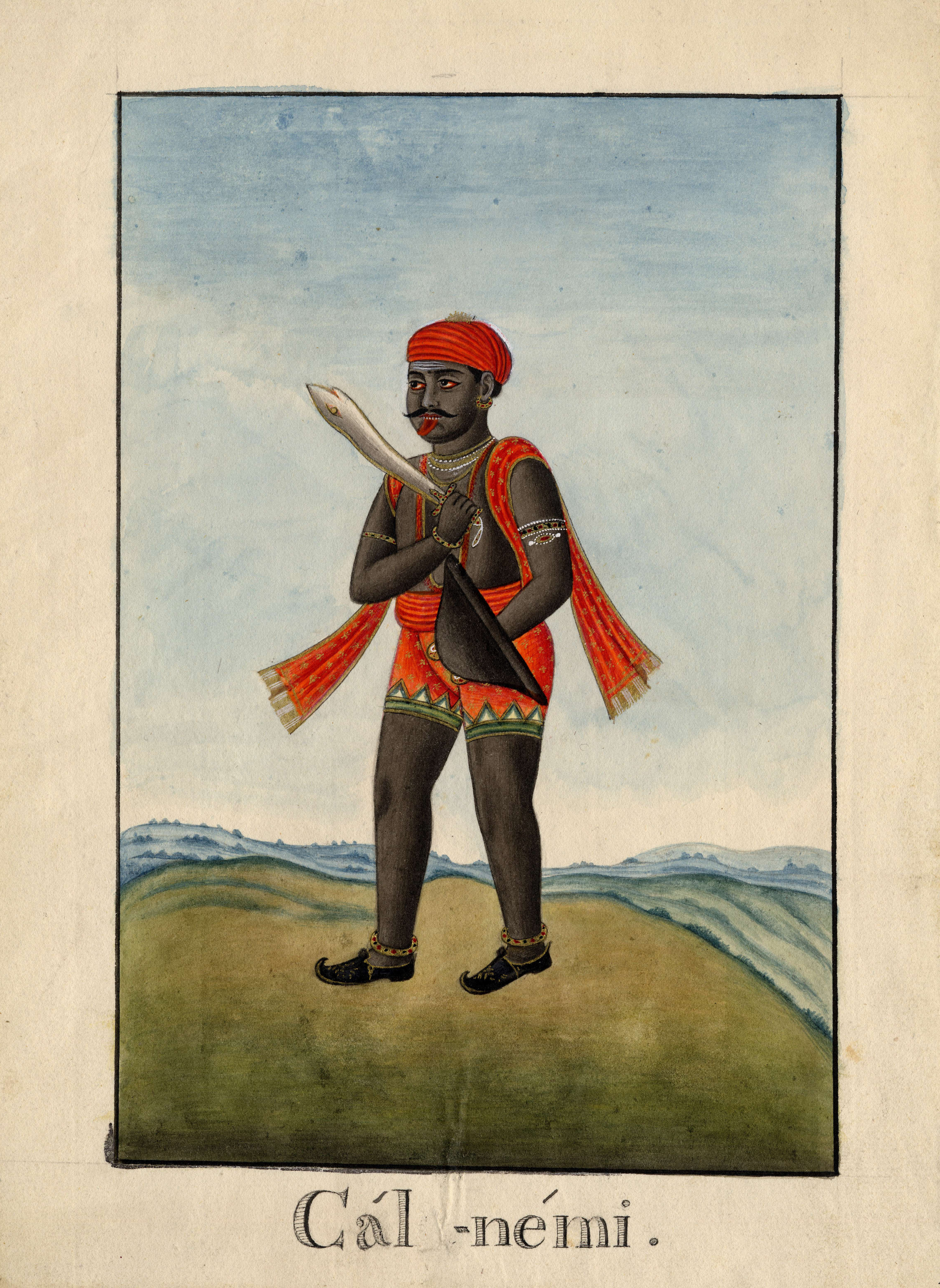
- Artwork of Kalanemi.
- Affiliation: Asura (Daitya)
- Texts: Matsya Purana, Skanda Purana

Genealogy
- Parents: Virochana (father)
- Siblings: Mahabali
- Children: Vrinda (daughter); Hamsa, Suvikrama, Kratha, Damana, Ripurmardana, and Krodhahanta (sons)

Kalanemi (Sanskrit: कालनेमि, lit. 'felly of the wheel of time', IAST: Kālanemi) is an asura in Hindu mythology. He is the son of Virochana, and the grandson of Prahlada. He is slain by Vishnu in the Tarakamaya War, in which he is described to be a commander. In one of his rebirths, in various traditions, he is born as Kamsa, the son of Ugrasena, and becomes the king of Mathura. His nephew, Krishna, an avatar of Vishnu, slays him for his tyranny. Kalanemi's daughter, Vrinda, becomes Jalandhara's wife.

== Etymology ==
Kalanemi is a compound word made up of 'Kala', which means "time", and 'nemi', which means "the felly of a wheel or a portion". It represents the time segment of the wheel of time that denotes "the afternoon leading to sunset". 'Kala' also means "black", perceived to be the asura Kalanemi, who represents the period of darkness that "increases as the day move toward night and as the Dvapara Yuga moves towards the Kali Yuga."

== Legend ==
=== Tarakamaya War ===
In the Padma Purana, Kalanemi fought on the side of Soma and the rest of the daityas in the Tarakamaya War against the devas. He showered mountains upon the devas, who were terrified by the very sight of him as he had grown to immense proportions. He breathed flames from his mouth, and launched a number of divine missiles on his foes. Vishnu rode upon Garuda in order to meet him in battle. He shouted obscenities at the preserver deity, who merely smiled and announced his impending doom. Furious, Kalanemi launched a multitude of weapons on Vishnu's chest from his hundred arms. When the asura smashed Garuda's head with his mace, Vishnu retaliated by employing the Sudarshana Chakra to chop all of the former's arms, causing his lifeless form to shake the earth upon its collapse.

=== Sons ===
Kalanemi had six sons: Hamsa, Suvikrama, Kratha, Damana, Ripurmardana, and Krodhahanta, who in their previous births had been the sons of Marichi, a manasaputra (mind-born son) of Brahma. Due to the fact that they had performed a penance to Brahma, their grandfather, Hiranyakashipu, cursed them first to be condemned to sleep for a long period in Patala, and then altered their curse to be born on earth as the first six sons of Devaki. Their father, Kalanemi, would be reborn as Kamsa, the son of Ugrasena, and would be their uncle, killing them all immediately after their birth.

=== Samudra Manthana ===
According to the Skanda Purana, after the churning of the ocean of milk, when the nectar amrita was denied to the daityas and danavas by Vishnu in the form of Mohini, a battle ensued between the two asura races and the devas. The devas were led by Indra, the king of Svarga, while the asuras were led by the sons of Virochana, initially by Bali, the chief of the asuras, and later by Kalanemi. After Indra had slain Bali with a thunderbolt, another daitya king named Vrishparva attacked Indra, and was also killed. Kalanemi, riding a lion as his mount, fiercely attacked Indra and his followers, which unnerved the devas. They were then advised by Narada to seek the help of Vishnu, as only he could kill Kalanemi, who had immense powers acquired by meditation. On the request made by the devas, Vishnu, riding his mount Garuda, attacked Kalanemi, and rendered him unconscious. Regaining consciousness, Kalanemi realised that he was confronting Vishnu, and accepted his defeat, requesting Vishnu to grant him beatitude as he had been defeated by a divine being. Thus, Vishnu acquired the epithet of kalanemi-niha.

== Bibliography ==
- Hudson, D Dennis (2008). The Body of God: An Emperor's Palace for Krishna in Eighth-Century Kanchipuram. Oxford University Press. ISBN 978-0-19-970902-1.
- Kennedy, Vans (1831). Researches Into the Nature and Affinity of Ancient and Hindu Mythology. Longmans, Rees, Orme, Brown, and Green. p. 362.
- Williams, George M. (2008). Handbook of Hindu Mythology. OUP USA. ISBN 978-0-19-533261-2.
