= Yashoda =

Foster-mother of Krishna

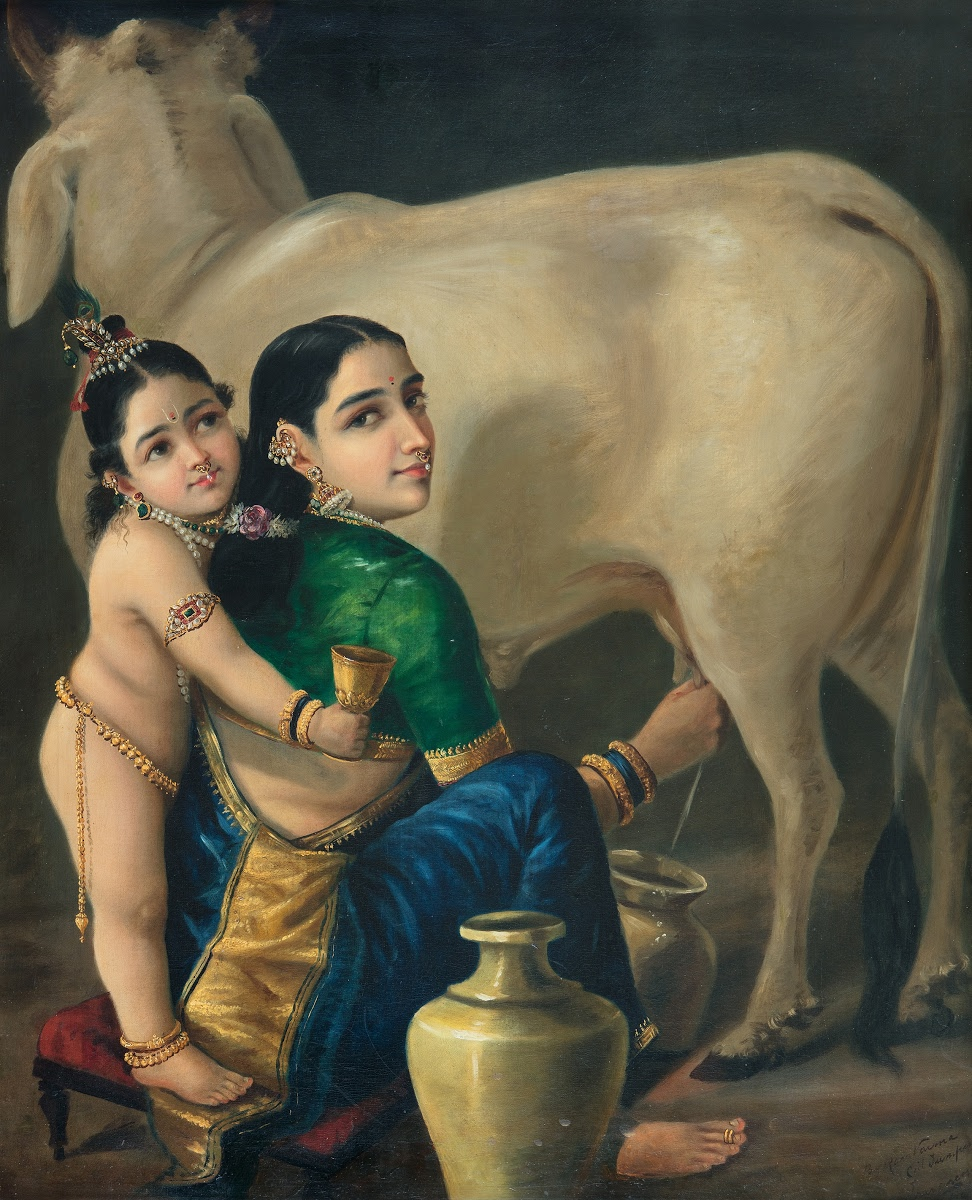
- Yashoda milks a cow, while an infant Krishna hugs her, painting by Raja Ravi Varma
- Abode: Vrindavana
- Texts: Bhagavata Purana, Harivamsa, Mahabharata, Vishnu Purana, Brahmavaivarta Purana

Genealogy
- Parents: Sumukha/Giribhanu (father); Padmavati/Pataladevi (mother)
- Siblings: Bhadra, Madira, Yashodhara, Yashodeva, Sudeva, Kumbhaka
- Spouse: Nanda
- Children: Krishna (foster-son); Balarama (foster-son); Yogamaya (daughter)
- Dynasty: Yaduvamsha

Yashoda (Sanskrit: यशोदा, IAST: Yaśodā) is the foster-mother of Krishna and the wife of Nanda. She is described in the Puranic texts of Hinduism as the wife of Nanda, the chieftain of Gokul, and the sister of Rohini. According to the Bhagavata Purana, Krishna was born to Devaki, but Krishna's father, Vasudeva, brought the newborn Krishna to his cousin Nanda, and his wife, Yashoda, in Gokulam. This was for his upbringing, as well as to protect Krishna from Devaki's brother, Kamsa, the tyrannical king of Mathura.

== Etymology ==
The name Yashoda means 'one who is giver (da, दा) of fame or glory (Yash, यश)'.

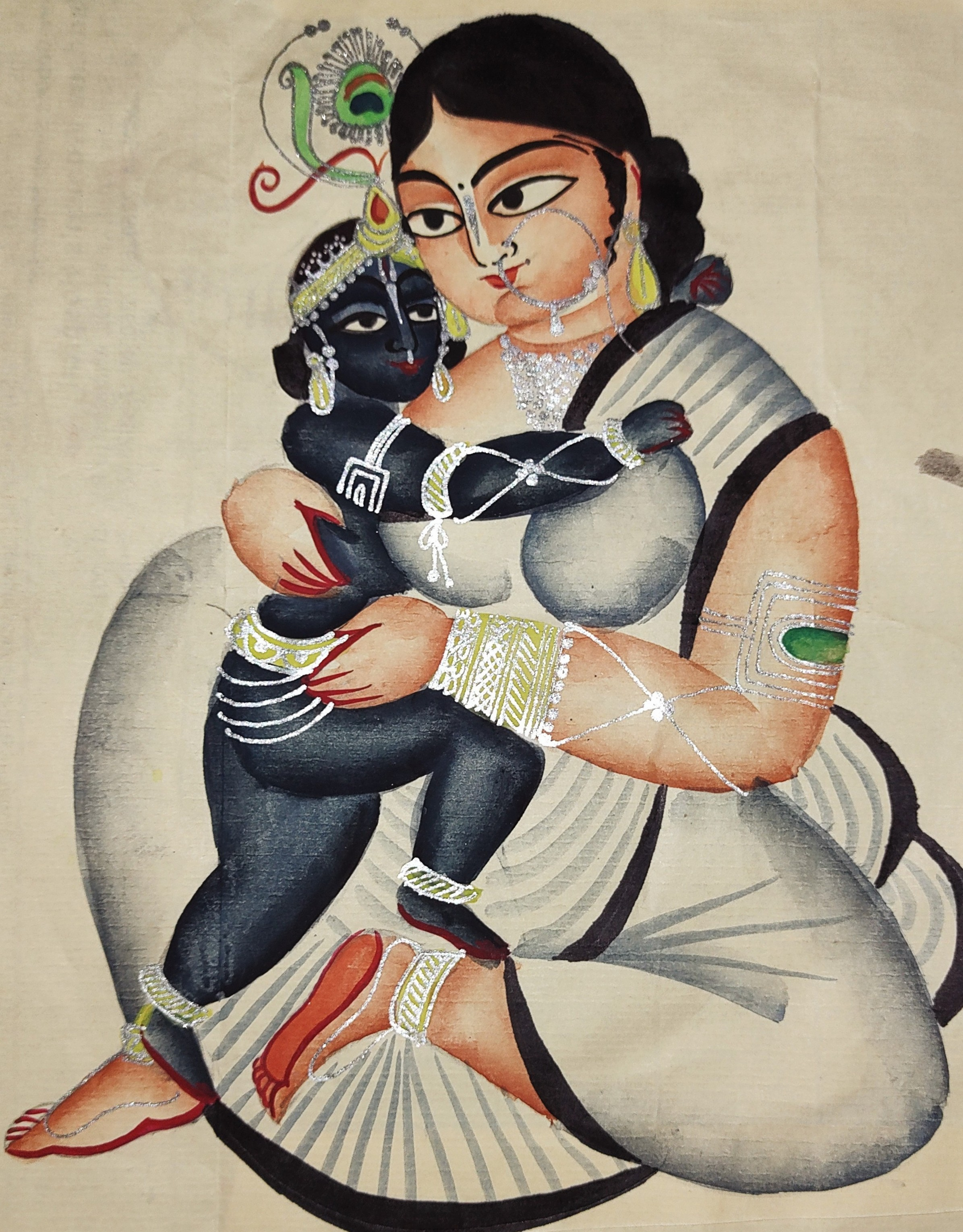
Yashoda and Krishna, inspired from Kalighat Painting.

== Legends ==
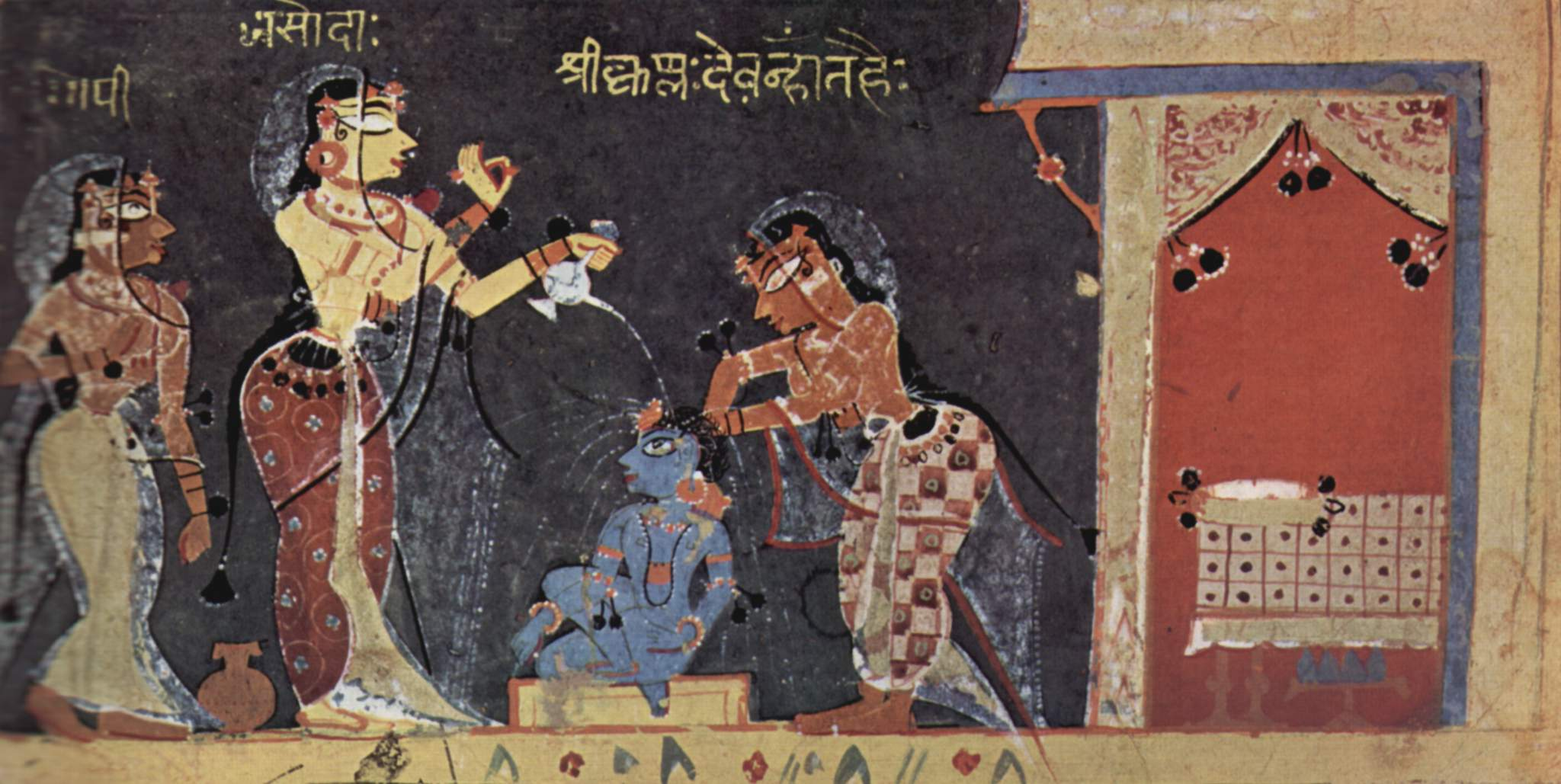
Yashoda bathing the child Krishna-Illustration of a Bhagavata Purana manuscript, c. 1500 CE

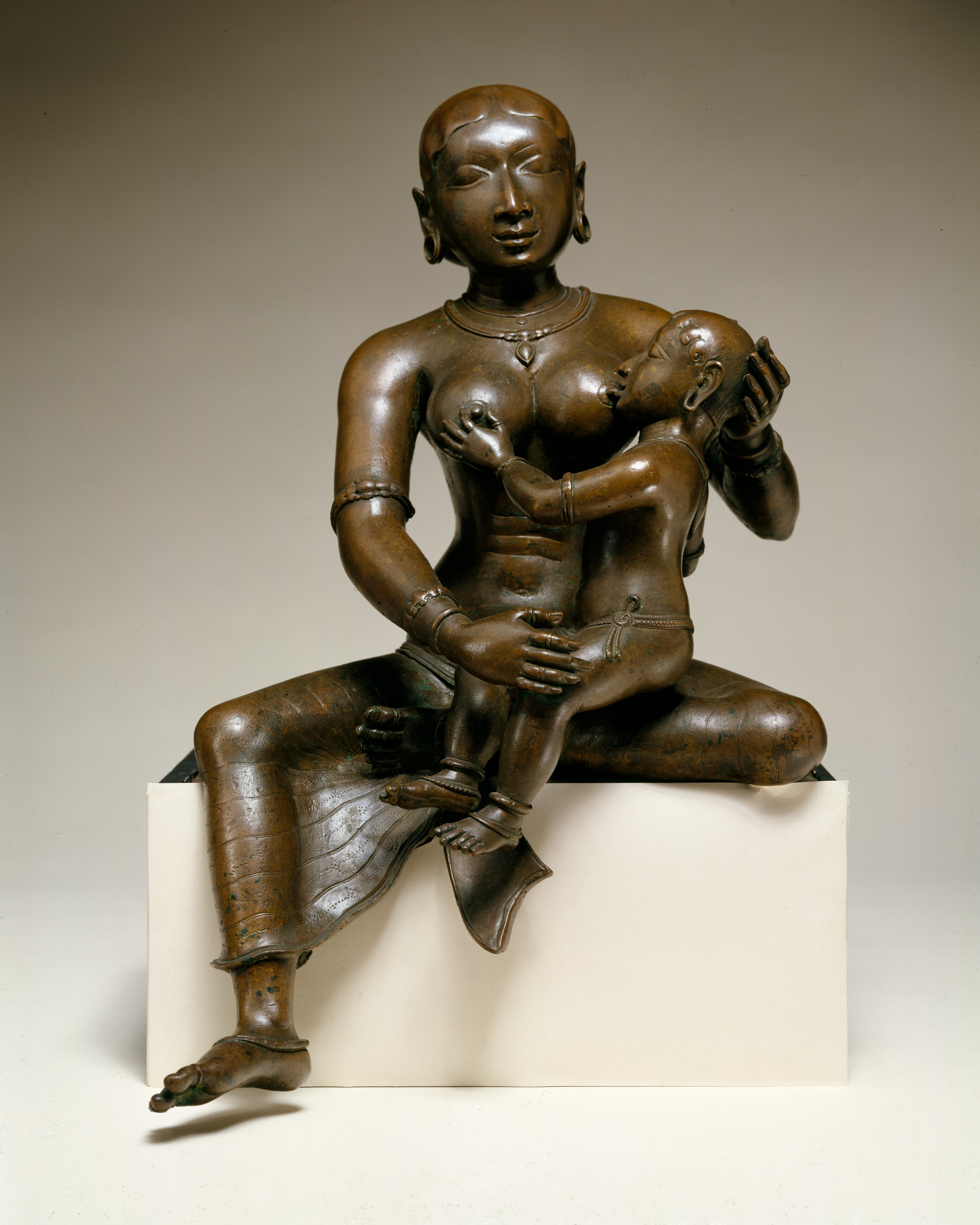
Foster-mother Yashoda with the Infant Krishna. Chola period early 12th century, Tamil Nadu, India.

=== Origin ===
According to the Bhagavata Purana, Yashoda was the incarnation of the wife of the Vasu, Drona. Little is known about Yashoda's early life, other than her marriage to Nanda. Kamsa, the ruler of Mathura, had decided to kill Krishna as soon as he was born. In order to protect Krishna from Kamsa, Krishna and Yogamaya were born at the same time from the wombs of Devaki and Yashoda, respectively, and were exchanged by Vasudeva Anakadundubhi. Krishna survived and was raised as the foster-son of Yashoda. Various childhood episodes or lilas, growing up in Yashoda's household, abound in Hindu texts. In the Bhagavata Purana, Yashoda is praised as:

Neither Lord Brahmā, nor Lord Śiva, nor even the goddess of fortune (Goddess Mahalakshmi), who is always the better half of the Supreme Lord, can obtain from the Supreme Personality of Godhead, the deliverer from this material world, such mercy as received by mother Yaśodā

— Bhagavata Purana, Canto 10, Chapter 9, Verse 20

=== Witnessing the Cosmos in Krishna's Mouth ===
The Bhagavata Purana describes the following episode:

Another day, Śrī Kṛṣṇa was playing at Brahmāṇḍa-ghaṭa with Śrīdāma, Subala, Balarāma and some other cowherd boys. Child Kṛṣṇa secretly ate some mud, but somehow the cowherd boys saw Him doing this and complained to Mother Yaśodā. Yaśodā came running and, catching hold of Kṛṣṇa’s hand, she began to chastise Him. Trembling with fear, Kṛṣṇa said, “Mother, I have not eaten any mud. All these boys are telling lies. If you do not believe Me, then you can look in My mouth and see for yourself.” Saying this, Kṛṣṇa opened His mouth and showed her the whole universe, containing all moving and non-moving entities, the sky, etc., as well as His own abode (dhāma).

— Bhagavata Purana, Verse 10.8.32–39

=== Liberation of Nalakuvara and Manigriva ===
According to the Bhagavata Purana, once, Krishna was playing in the sand and was swallowing it. Yashoda, upon seeing this, was furious with Krishna for disobeying her and punished him by tying him to a mortar, or a grinding stone. The child dragged the mortar to the tree called Marutru, and got himself stuck between the twin trees. Immediately, the trees regained their original forms of Nalakuvara and Manigriva, the sons of Kubera. The deities had been cursed by Narada for not paying heed to him, and had been liberated from their curse as trees after meeting Krishna. They paid homage to the child, who blessed them, and the two returned to Vaishravanapuri.

=== Slaying of Putana ===
When the demoness Putana attempts to murder the infant Krishna by breastfeeding him with her poison, Krishna sucks out her life force instead, turning her into a carcass. Hearing the demoness' dying screams, Yashoda finds the corpse still bearing her child in her arms. Yashoda snatches him and waves a cow-tail brush over him in order to guard him from harm.

=== Reincarnation of Yashoda ===
According to regional tradition, in the Dvapara Yuga, Yashoda could not witness the wedding of Krishna. Krishna promised her that she would get that chance of seeing his wedding when Krishna incarnates again as Venkateshvara in the Kali Yuga. In the Kali Yuga, Yashoda was born as Vakula Devi, as the mother of Venkateshvara and witnessed the nuptials between Venkateshvara and Princess Padmavathi.

== See also ==
- Rohini
- Krishna Janmashtami
- Nanda
- Yadu
- Kamsa
- Radha
- Kunti

== In popular culture ==
The 1975 Telugu film Yashoda Krishna, directed by C. S. Rao, presented events in the life of Krishna and his attachment towards Yashoda. Sridevi played the role of the child Krishna in the film. The Tamil devotional song, 'Enna Thavam Seithanai' is addressed to Yashoda, rhetorically wondering what penance she had performed to raise Krishna as her own child. The Carnatic song, "Thaaye Yashoda", composed by Oothukkadu Venkata Kavi, is another song addressed to Yashoda from the perspective of gopikas who complain about Krishna's mischief.
