= Parjanya (Hinduism) =

Grandfather of Krishna in the epic Mahabharata

Personal Information
- Family: Parents: Devamida (father); Siblings: Shurasena (Brother)
- Spouse: Variyasi
- Children: Children; 5 Sons, including: Upananda; Abhinanda; Nanda; Sananda; Nandana

Parjanya (Sanskrit: पार्जन्य, IAST: Pārjánya) also known as Parjanya Maharaja or Parjanya was one of the sons of king Devamida and the brother of Shurasena. He was also paternal granduncle of Krishna and father of the Nanda.

According to Mahabharata and Puranas, he was born to second wife of king Devamida and was given the charge as chieftain of Mahavan (a region of Braj).

== See also ==
- Nanda
- Shurasena
