= Nandagopa =

Foster-father of the Hindu god Krishna

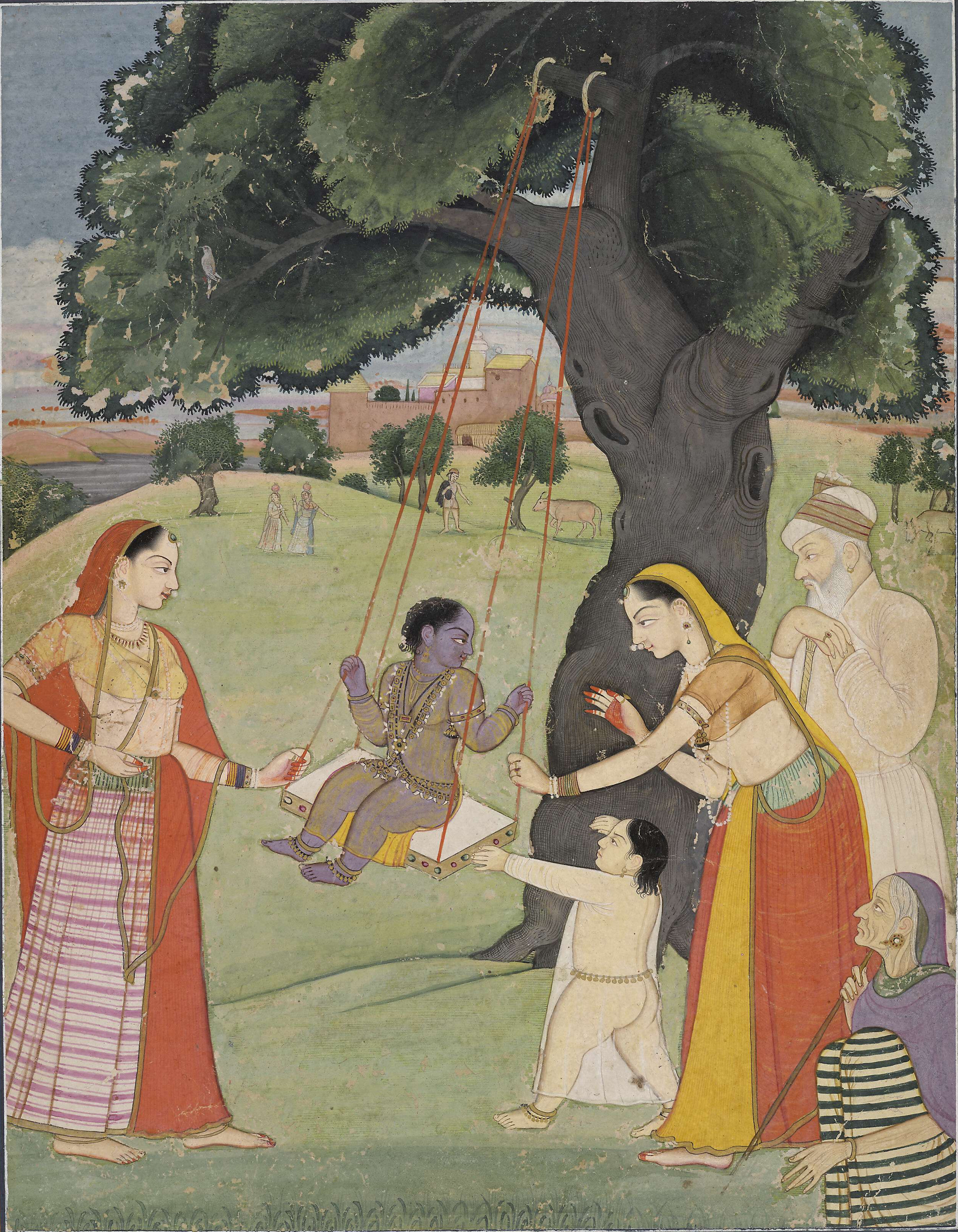
- Nanda (right) watches Krishna being pushed on a swing.
- Texts: Bhagavata Purana, Harivamsa, Vishnu Purana, Mahabharata
- Region: Gokulam

Genealogy
- Parents: Parjanya (Hinduism) (father)
- Spouse: Yashoda
- Children: Krishna, Balarama (foster-children); Yogamaya (biological daughter)

Nanda or Nandagopa (Sanskrit: नन्द, IAST: Nanda) is a cow-herd chief in Hindu mythology, who is the foster-father of Krishna. He is featured in the Hindu texts Harivaṃśa and the Puranas. Nanda is the son of Parjanya, a ruler of the Braj region, who is a son of Devamidha. According to sources He was Cowherd and the chief of Gokulam which was one of the powerful mandals of the Yadavas.

According to sources Vasudeva and Nanda were brothers, while there are also sources which state the two being step-brothers and good friends. Vasudeva takes his newborn son, Krishna, to Nanda on the night of the child's birth, so that Nanda could raise him and to protect new born Krishna from his maternal uncle Kamsa. The chief, who is married to Yashoda, brings up both Krishna, and his brother, Balarama. Krishna derives his epithet Nandanandana (son of Nanda) from him.

== Legend ==
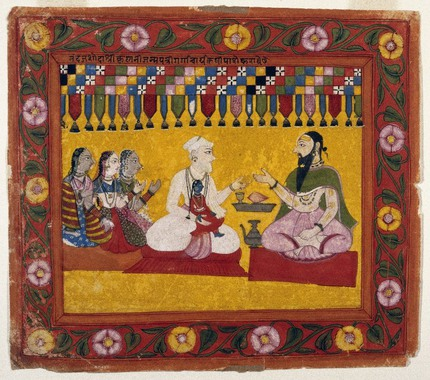
Nanda requests a horoscope for Krishna.

Nanda was the foster-father of Krishna. He also helped to raise Balarama. Nanda, identified as King Nanda in many scriptures was a kinsman and a great friend of Vasudeva. According to Sripad Madhvacarya, Vasudeva and Nanda were step-brothers. Some other sources suggests them to be only friends. King Vasudeva married Devaki, the daughter of King Devaka. Devaki's cousin, an evil tyrant named Kamsa, had imprisoned his father, Ugrasena, and usurped the throne. Owing to a divine prophecy that he would be slain by the eighth child of Devaki, Kamsa arranged that all of Devaki's sons should die at birth. Six children thus perished. Vasudeva's wife, Rohini, gave birth to Balarama, and Krishna himself was placed by Vasudeva into the hands of Nanda. Both Krishna and Balarama were brought up by Nanda, the cowherd-chief, and his wife, Yashoda.

A legend from the Bhagavata Purana describes the episode of Nanda's abduction. Having observed a fast during the ekadashi, he entered the waters of the Yamuna the following night to perform ablutions, disregarding the fact that it was a period of the day that was reserved for the asuras. He was captured by an asura who served Varuna, the god of water, and took him to his underwater realm. Having heard that his foster-father had been taken captive, Krishna reassured his community of the former's safety, and sought an audience with Varuna. Delighted at the sight of Krishna, Varuna offered his obeisance, as well as apologies for his servant's actions, and returned Nanda from his abode. Astonished at the sight of Varuna's abode as well as his foster-son's actions, Nanda conveyed this incident to the people of Gokulam, who determined that Krishna must be Ishvara.

When Krishna is enveloped by the serpent Kaliya, Nanda and his men attempt to rescue him by diving into the Yamuna, but he was restrained by Balarama, who knew the true identity of his brother.

In an episode, Nanda and all the people of Vraja undertook a pilgrimage to a site named Ambika Vana, where they worshipped Shiva and Parvati, and bathed in the Sarasvati river. They spent the night at the banks of the river. A huge python started to swallow Nanda, having caught hold of his leg. Hearing his cries for help, Krishna and the cowherds arrived to rescue him. The men tried to brandish their torches at the snake to free him, but to no avail. Krishna merely tapped the python with his foot, and the creature assumed the form of a gandharva. The gandharva explained that he was named Sudarshana, and due to the fact that he had laughed to mock sages from his vimana, he had been cursed with the form of a python; the touch of Krishna's foot had liberated him from his curse.

== Genealogy ==
Yadu
Yadava dynasty (After 74 generations)
Vrishni
Madisha	Devamida	Vesparna
Shurasena	Marisha	Parjanya	Variyasi
Vasudeva	Devaki	Nanda	Yashoda
Krishna	Yogamaya

== Veneration ==
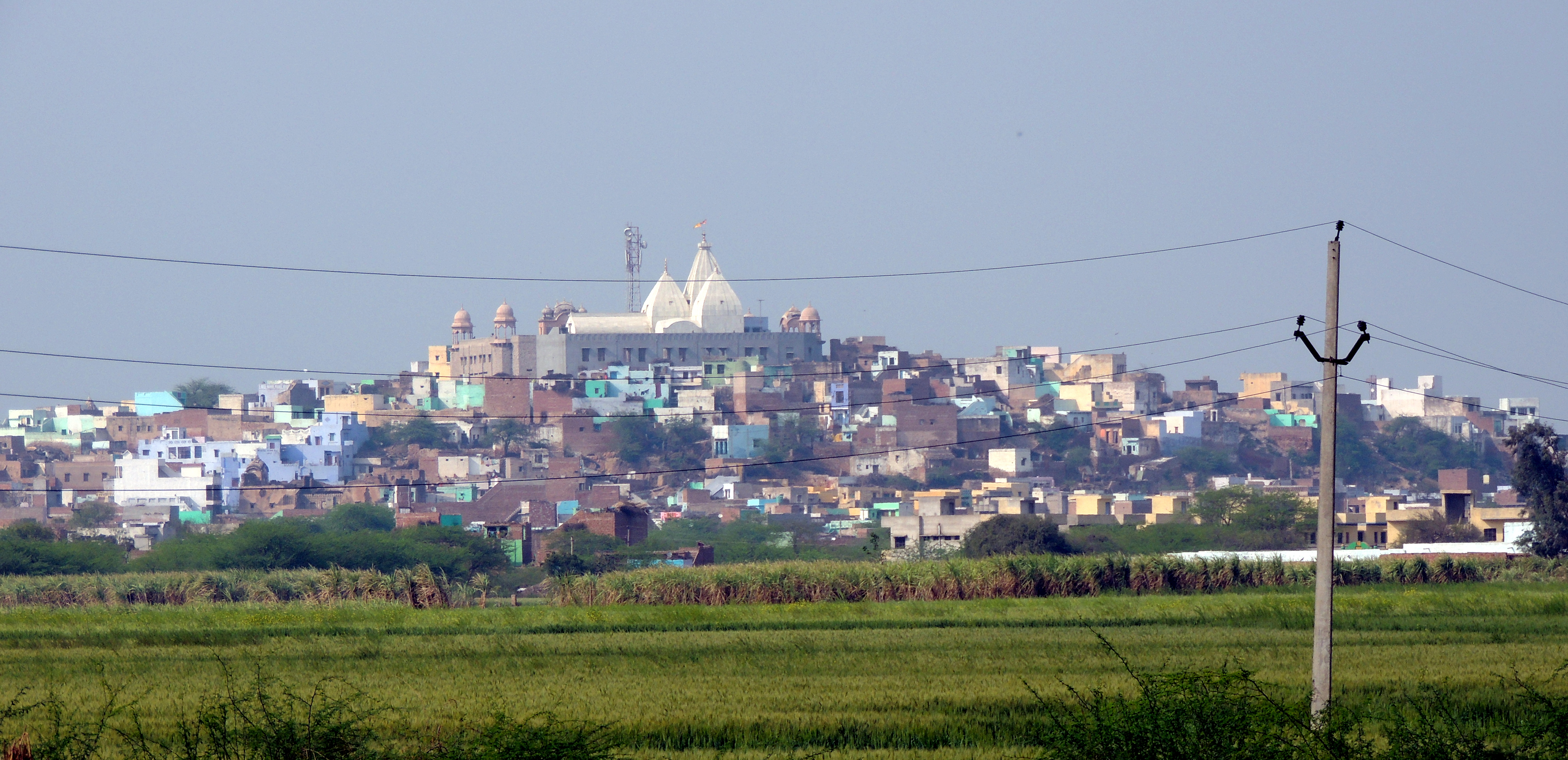
Nandagaon

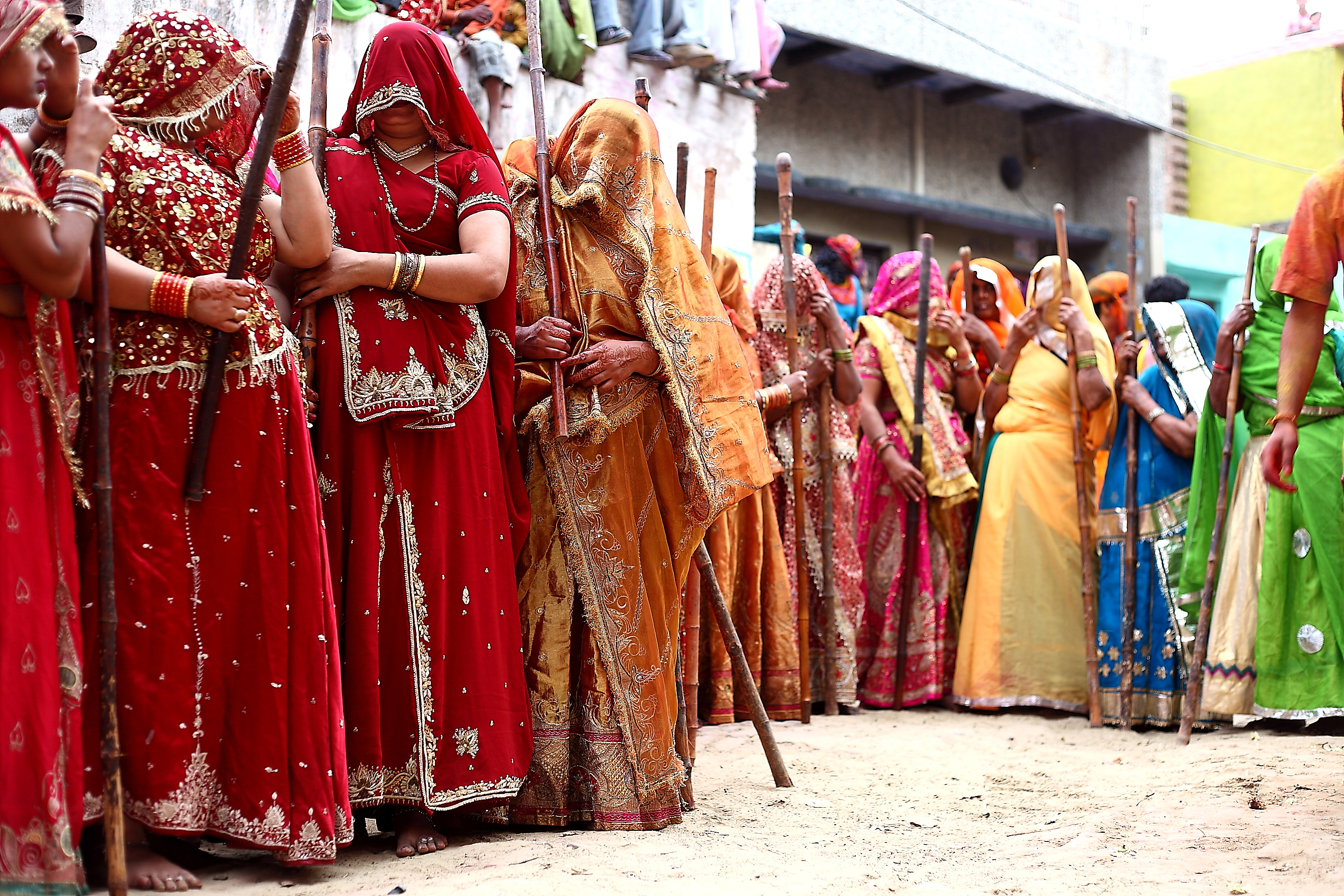
Women waiting for gopis in the streets of Nandagaon during Lath mar Holi

=== Nandagaon ===
Nandagaon is one of the religious places near Barsana in Braj. Since the sixteenth century the town has been associated with Nanda and Krishna. The Nanda Bhavan aka Nandrayji ka Mandir houses identical images of Krishna and Balarama flanked by Nanda and Yashoda. The current temple was built in the mid-eighteenth century by a ruler named Rup (Roop) Singh.

Surrounding the town are several tanks and ponds associated with events from Krishna's life.

=== Nanda Bhavan (Chaurasi Khamba Mandir) ===
The residence of Nanda, known as Nanda Bhavan, where Krishna is said to have grown up and spent the first three years of his childhood is a main and most famous temple in Mahavan. This yellow coloured building has many wall paintings depicting pastimes of Krishna has 84 pillars inside. It is believed that there are 84,00,000 species in this material world and each pillar is said to symbolize 100,000 species, thus representing all the life in the universe.

=== Nanda Ghata ===
The Nanda Ghata is situated on the banks of the sacred river Yamuna. The Ghata (Riverbank) is related to the rescue of Nanda's abduction by the asura of Varuna, while Nanda was taking a bath in the holy river, Yamuna.

== See also ==
- Parjanya
- Yashoda
- Vasudeva
- Vrishabhanu
- Krishna
- Balarama
