= Shurasena =

King in Hindu mythology

Personal Information
- Family: Parents: Devamida (father); Siblings: Parjanya (brother)
- Spouse: Marisha
- Children: Children; 15 Children, including: Samudravijaya (son); Vasudeva (son); Pritha (daughter)
- Relatives: Cousins: Kuntibhoja (cousin)

Shurasena or Shursen/Shursaini (Sanskrit: शूरसेन, IAST: Śūrasena) was a ruler of Mathura or Sursena Mahajanpada. He was married to a nāga community woman named Marisha. She bore all of his children and was the cause for Vasuki's boon to Bhima. He is stated to be the king after whom the Surasena Kingdom was named and founded.

Shurasena was the father of Samudravijaya (himself father of Arishtanemi), Vasudeva (himself father of Vāsudeva-Krishna & Balrama ) and Kunti (mother of Karna and the Pandavas). He is extensively mentioned in both the Mahabharata and the Puranas as the father of Vasudeva (father of Krishna) and Kunti.
