= Rohini (wife of Vasudeva) =

Mother of the Hindu god Balarama

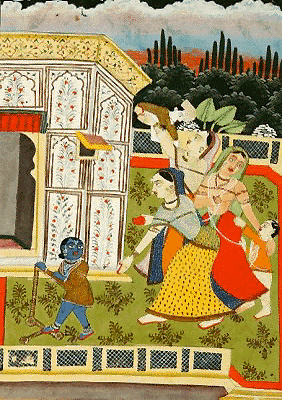
- Rohini (yellow attire) with Balarama
- Devanagari: रोहिणी
- Venerated in: Vaishnavism
- Texts: Mahabharata

Genealogy
- Born: Bahlika Kingdom
- Parents: Bahlika (father)
- Siblings: Somadatta and Pauravi
- Spouse: Vasudeva
- Children: Balarama (surrogate child); Sarana, Shatha, Sharu, Subhra, Pindaraka, Ushinara, Sishirayan, Mahabhaga, Manusha, Subhadra (daughters)
- Dynasty: Chandravamsha

In Hindu mythology, Rohini (Sanskrit: रोहिणी, lit. 'Ascending', IAST: Rohiṇī) was the first consort of Vasudeva , and the mother of the Hindu deities Balarama and Subhadra. She plays a prominent role in the upbringing of Krishna.

== Legend ==
Rohini is described as the daughter of king Bahlika, making her a cousin of Bhishma. She is married to Vasudeva, a descendant of Yadu, a Chandravamsha king. Her sister, Pauravi, was also married to Vasudeva.

Vasudeva also married Devaki, a princess of Mathura. The couple is imprisoned by Devaki's brother Kamsa, soon after their marriage, as a divine prophecy predicted Kamsa's death by Devaki's eighth son.

While Vasudeva is imprisoned, Rohini lives at the house of her husband's cousin Nanda, in Vraja. While all previous sons of Devaki are slain, the seventh embryo is transferred to Rohini's womb. Rohini gives birth to Balarama.

Krishna, the eighth child of Devaki, was exchanged with the daughter of Nanda and Yashoda in secrecy. Yashoda (foster-mother of Krishna) and Rohini play an important nurturing Krishna and Balarama in their childhood.

After Vasudeva is freed by Krishna and Balarama, Rohini gives birth to a daughter, Subhadra.

In the epic Mahabharata, after the death of Vasudeva in the Yadava massacre, Rohini cremates herself on Vasudeva's pyre along with his other wives Devaki, Bhadra, and Madira.

== Mother of Balarama ==
Balarama is given the matronymic epithet Rauhineya, "son of Rohini". In the Brahma Vaivarta Purana, Rohini is said to be an avatar of Kadru, mother of the serpents (naga); Balarama is considered an avatar of Vishnu's mount, Shesha.

== In Jain texts ==
In Jain tales related to Krishna and Balarama, Rohini is the princess of Kosala who chooses Vasudeva as her husband in a swayamvara ceremony. She spends her life in Saurapura with Vasudeva, where she gives birth to Balarama. She sees four dreams in the Jain narrative: a lion, a white elephant, the moon and the ocean; symbols associated with Balarama in Hinduism as well as Jainism. Rohini plays no part in nurturing Krishna in Vraja; she takes care of Balarama in Saurapura. The adult Balarama goes to Vraja to aid Krishna.
