= Kunti =

Queen and mother of the Pandavas in the epic Mahabharata

- Mahabharata character
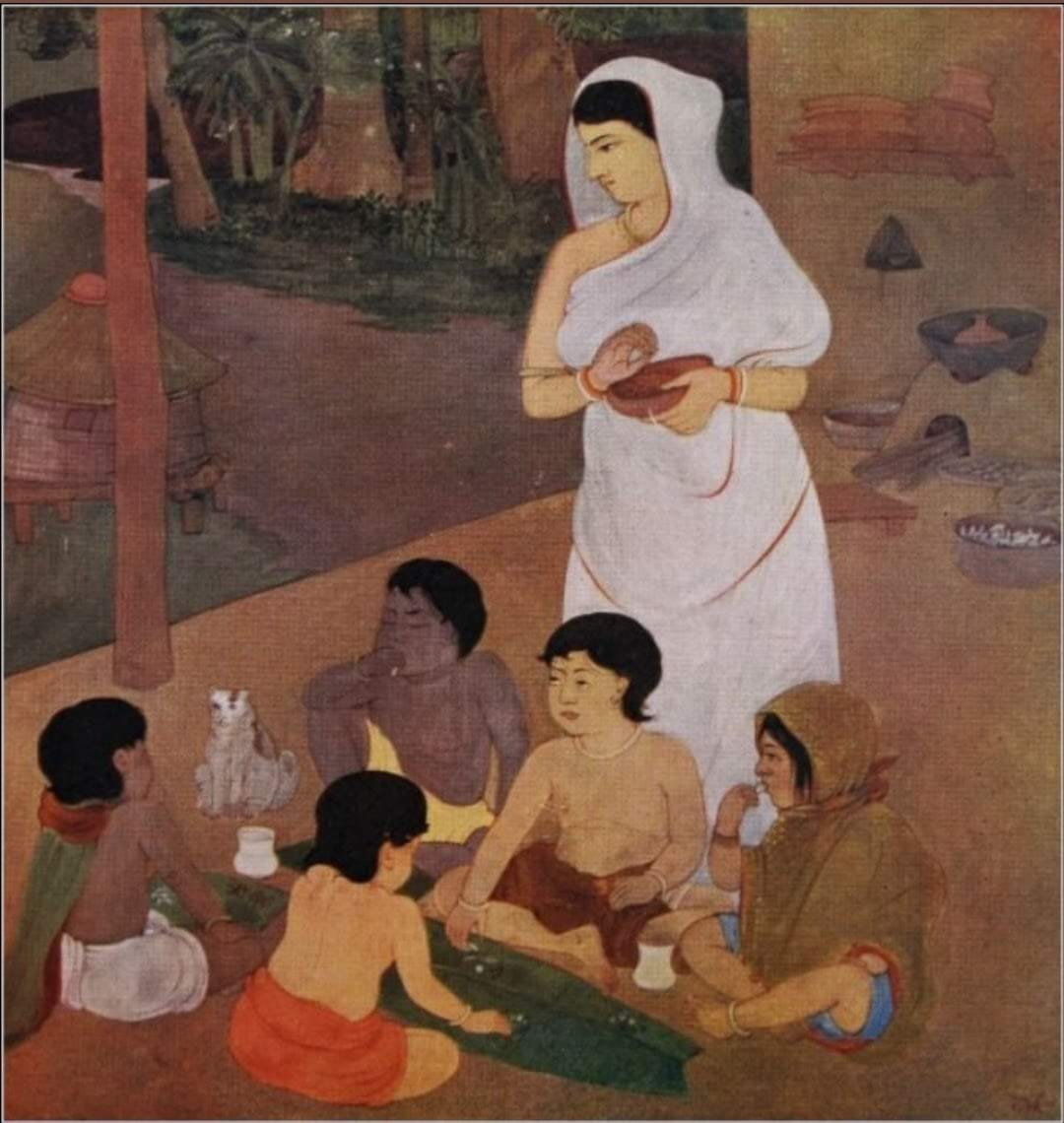
- A 20th century painting by Nandalal Bose, presumed to depict Kunti feeding the Pandavas

Information
- Position: Queen of Kuru Kingdom
- Affiliation: Pandavas; Panchakanya
- Family: Shurasena (father); Marisha (mother); Kuntibhoja (adoptive father); Vasudeva and 13 others (siblings); Purujit (adoptive brother)
- Spouse: Pandu
- Children: Karna by Surya (pre-marital); Yudhishthira by Dharma; Bhima by Vayu; Arjuna by Indra; Nakula; Sahadeva (step-sons)
- Relatives: Madri (co-wife)
- Origin: Kunti Kingdom
- Dynasty: Yaduvamsha (by birth); Kuru Dynasty (by marriage)
- Clan: Vrishni

Kunti (Sanskrit: कुन्ती, IAST: Kuntī), also known as Pritha (Sanskrit: पृथा, IAST: Pṛthā), is a prominent character in the Mahabharata, an ancient Sanskrit epic poem. A princess of the Vrishni dynasty, she becomes the wife of Pandu, king of the Kuru Kingdom, and is chiefly known as the mother of the five Pandavas—having given birth to the three eldest, Yudhishthira, Bhima, and Arjuna—and raising their younger stepbrothers, Nakula and Sahadeva, as her own.

Kunti is one of the few female figures in the epic whose early life is described in detail. Born to Shurasena, a chief of Vrishni clan, she is adopted by her childless uncle, Kuntibhoja, the ruler of Kunti Kingdom. During her adolescence, she receives a divine mantra from the sage Durvasa, which allows her to invoke any deity and bear a child by them. Out of curiosity, she uses the mantra to invoke the sun god Surya, resulting in the concealed birth of her first son, Karna. Due to the societal stigma surrounding childbirth outside of marriage, she abandons Karna shortly after his birth.

Kunti plays a significant role in the Kuru dynasty. After marrying Pandu, who is cursed to die instantly if he engages in intercourse, Kunti uses her boon to bear Yudhishthira, Bhima, and Arjuna by invoking the gods Dharma, Vayu, and Indra, in accordance with Pandu’s request to have children through the practice of niyoga. She later shares the boon with her co-wife, Madri, who gives birth to Nakula and Sahadeva. Following Pandu’s death and Madri’s self-immolation, Kunti assumes responsibility for all five children and raises them in Hastinapura, the capital of the Kuru Kingdom. A misunderstanding on Kunti’s part results in the polyandrous marriage of Draupadi, the princess of Panchala, to all five Pandava brothers. Kunti then serves as the queen-mother of Indraprastha until the Pandavas are exiled. Prior to the Kurukshetra War, Kunti meets Karna, who had joined the opposing Kaurava side, and discloses his true parentage, urging him to join the Pandava side. Although Karna refuses to switch allegiance, he agrees to spare all of Kunti’s sons except Arjuna. Following the Pandavas’ victory, Kunti reveals Karna’s identity to them and later retires to the forest with other elders of the Kuru dynasty and eventually dies in a forest fire.

Within Hindu tradition, Kunti is venerated as one of the panchakanya ("five maidens"), embodying ideals of female chastity. Her name is believed to possess purifying qualities, capable of dispelling sin when recited. Kunti is lauded as the epitome of dutiful womanhood, noted for her intelligence, beauty, foresight and political acumen.

== Literary background ==
Kunti appears in the Mahabharata, one of the Sanskrit epics originating from the Indian subcontinent, which primarily narrates about conflict between two groups of cousins—the Pandavas and the Kauravas. Composed in Classical Sanskrit, the text is a composite work shaped through centuries of revisions, editing, and interpolations. The text is primarily composed between 300 BCE - 300 CE, with the oldest portions of the extant text likely date to around 400 BCE. Manuscripts of the Mahabharata exist in numerous versions, with substantial variations in the details of key characters and events. An exception is the section containing the Bhagavad Gita, which remains notably consistent across different manuscripts. Significant differences exist between the Northern and Southern recensions, with the Southern versions generally being more elaborate and extended. Scholars have undertaken the creation of a critical edition, primarily drawing from the "Bombay", "Poona", "Calcutta", and "South Indian" editions of the text. The most widely accepted version is that compiled by a team led by Vishnu Sukthankar at the Bhandarkar Oriental Research Institute, with copies preserved at Kyoto University, Cambridge University, and various institutions across India.

Quickly after her introduction in the Adi Parva—the first of the eighteen books of the Mahabharata—Kunti emerges as a foundational female figure whose narrative significance sets her apart from her contemporaries, playing a central role in shaping the future course of the epic. Early in the royal genealogies, as Bhishma arranges the marriages intended to restore the Kuru lineage, three women—Gandhari, Kunti, and Madri—are brought into focus. Scholar Alf Hiltebeitel points out that it is Kunti who quickly becomes the "rising star" of the narrative skein that spans chapters 103 to 119. Kunti is uniquely privileged in this section of the text. While Gandhari and Madri are introduced more briefly, an entire adhyaya (chapter 104) is devoted to Kunti’s childhood—making her the only woman marrying into a central royal line in either the Mahabharata or the Ramayana whose girlhood is explored in such depth. Quantitative evidence from this narrative arc underscores Kunti’s prominence: between chapters 103.9 and 119.12, the text allocates 195 verses to Kunti, compared to 85 for Madri and just 36 for Gandhari. According to James L. Fitzgerald, Kunti's main scenes in the Mahabharata all involve her premarital son Karna.

Pradeep Bhattacharya observes that Kunti’s pivotal decision in the later part of the Adi Parva—having her sons share Draupadi—not only influences the trajectory of the plot but also marks a transition in the epic’s focus from Kunti to Draupadi as the central female figure in the following books. Kunti remains largely in the background following the Adi Parva until the Udyoga Parva, the fifth book of the Mahabharata. Here, she re-emerges during Krishna’s peace mission, having multiple dialogues while blessing Yudhishthira and pursuing Karna, who has aligned himself with the Kauravas, to join the Pandava side. In last part of the eleventh book, Stri Parva, Kunti—who has remained the most reticent among the epic’s principal female figures after the Kurukshetra War—finally speaks up to reveal Karna's true lineage to the Pandavas. She exits the main narrative in the Ashramavasika Parva, the fifteenth book.

== Etymology ==
The feminine epithet Kuntī (Sanskrit: कुन्ती) is a patronymic derivative, which the character acquired through her adoption by Kunti-bhoja. The epithet has its roots in the masculine noun Kunti (कुन्ति), which originally referred to a group of people. This ethnonym appears in classical Sanskrit texts such as the Kathaka Samhita, Pāṇini’s Aṣṭādhyāyī (4.1.176), and the Mahabharata. The male variant of the epithet is also used to denote rulers or princes of this lineage.

Kunti's original name is Pṛthā (Sanskrit: पृथा). According to scholar Alf Hiltebeitel, this name means 'the Wide', evoking both the goddess Pṛthivī (lit. 'the Broad Earth') and the description of her as a girl with "wide eyes" in the Mahabharata (3.287.12), reinforcing a symbolic alignment with the vastness and nurturing aspect of the Earth. Madeleine Biardeau observes that while other prominent women in the epic—such as Gandhari ('Woman of Gāndhāra') and Madri ('Woman of Madra')—derive their identities from specific geographic regions, Kunti’s name Pritha links her to the Earth as a whole, not to any one territory.

From a lexical standpoint, linguist Monier-Williams derives Pṛthā from the root pṛtha, related to pṛth, and suggest that it can also mean “the flat or palm of the hand', attested in texts such as the Śatapatha Brāhmaṇa. Building on this, sociologist Irawati Karve interpreted the name to suggest a physical characteristic, writing that it "shows that she was apparently a large big-boned girl". However, Lavanya Vemsani contests Karve’s interpretation, arguing that there is neither linguistic nor textual justification for this since the Mahabharata explicitly describes Kunti as a woman of stunning beauty.

== Biography ==
=== Early life ===
Kunti, originally named Pritha, is born into the lineage of the Yadava clan. She is the eldest child of Shurasena, a chief among the Yadavas and the father of several other children, most notably Vasudeva, the father of Krishna. (Note: Kunti’s family is further detailed in the Bhagavata Purana, a later text focusing primarily on the life of Krishna. According to this account, her mother is identified as Marisha, a princess of the Bhoja lineage. The text also states that Pritha has ten brothers and four sisters.) Shurasena had promised to give his eldest child to his childless cousin and close friend, Kuntibhoja, who was the son of Shurasena’s paternal aunt. As a result, Pritha is given in adoption by Shurasena to Kuntibhoja. (Note: While Kuntibhoja is initially introduced as childless, it is later revealed that he has sons—most notably his successor, Purujit—who participates in the Kurukshetra War on the side of the Pandavas.) Following the adoption, Pritha becomes known as Kunti and is raised in the royal household of Kuntibhoja, where she is trained in royal duties and received instruction in various disciplines, without a maternal presence. Later in life, Kunti reveals that she resents this act of adoption, recalling that she was merely playing with a ball when her father transferred her like wealth, and she felt humiliated by this decision of her family.

During her adolescence, Kuntibhoja entrusts her to the care of the powerful and temperamental sage Durvasa, who arrives at the court seeking hospitality under strict conditions. Kuntibhoja, confident in his daughter's humility and devotion, promises that she will serve him faithfully. Aware of the potential consequences of offending such a volatile figure, Kuntibhoja sternly warns Kunti that any lapse in service could bring dishonour upon both his dynasty and her birth family. Despite the pressure, Kunti submits to her duties with remarkable discipline, attending to the sage with devotion, enduring his sharp speech and frequent criticisms without complaint. Over the course of a year, Kunti’s service gradually earns the satisfaction of the sage. Eventually, Durvasa offers her a boon. Though she initially expresses contentment in having pleased both him and her father, she ultimately accepts his insistence on granting her a mantra (incantation). The mantra enables her to summon any deity, who is then bound to appear and obey her command, whether willingly or not. Compelled by fear of his curse, she receives the spell. Following this, Durvasa departs, leaving Kuntibhoja astonished and deeply gratified by his daughter’s endurance and virtue.

=== Birth of Karna ===
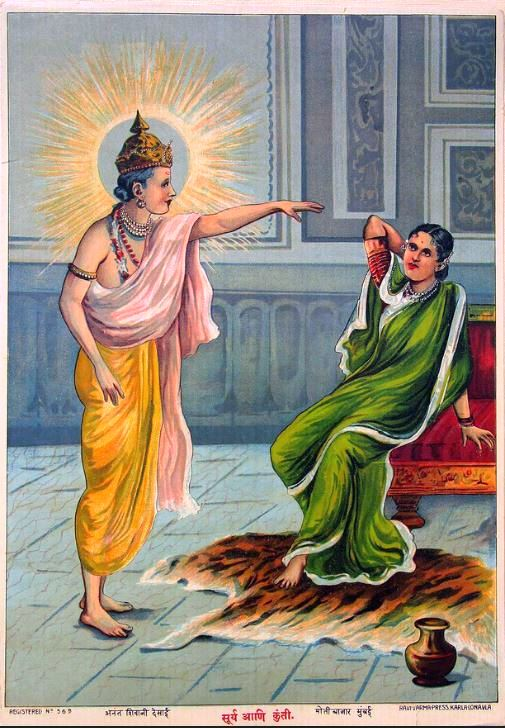
A oleographic print depicting Surya and Kunti, c. 1920

Within the epic, which follows the story within a story style of narration, the account of Karna's birth has been narrated multiple times, with the most detailed one being found in the Vana Parva (3.287.1-3.292.1).

It narrates that after the Durvasa's departure, Kunti reflected on the gift. Noticing that her menstrual period had begun, she felt shame at experiencing her flow while still unmarried. At dawn, while she observed the beauty of the rising sun; her sight having been made divine by the spell, she suddenly saw the sun as the handsome god Surya, adorned with divine armour and earings. Remembering that she could summon using the mantra, Kunti summoned Surya out of curiosity. Later, in a conversation with the sage Vyasa, Kunti candidly stated that she had desired Surya upon seeing him.

Surya appeared in radiant form and declared himself bound by her spell and asked her will. Kunti urged him to return, explaining she had summoned him only to test the formula. Surya refused, stating that once called, he could not return fruitless and suggested that he father a son with her, since her true intention—when she summoned him—was to bear a son equipped with armor and earrings that Surya had. He further threatened to curse her father, Durvasa, and the gods if she dismissed him unfulfilled. Fearing the curse and damage to her family’s honour, Kunti negotiated two terms: any son must be strong, ringed and armoured, and she must remain a virgin. Surya agreed, promising the child’s earrings and armour would be made from amrita (elixir), and assuring her that she would recover her virginity.

Surya assumed a yogic form, entered her and she fell stupefied upon her couch. When she recovered, she remained a kanya—a virgin girl—both in body and status, as Surya’s divine power leaves her visibly untouched, preserving her social reputation. Concealing the pregnancy with her nurse’s help, she later gave birth to a lustrous infant—orange-eyed and broad-shouldered like his father—already wearing an armour and sparkling golden earrings. At the nurse’s counsel, she placed the newborn in a beeswax-sealed basket and set it adrift on the River Ashva, praying for the protection of all celestial beings.

The child is discovered and adopted by a charioteer Adhiratha and his wife Radha, while Kunti returns to the palace, burdened with grief and secrecy.

=== Marriage and children ===
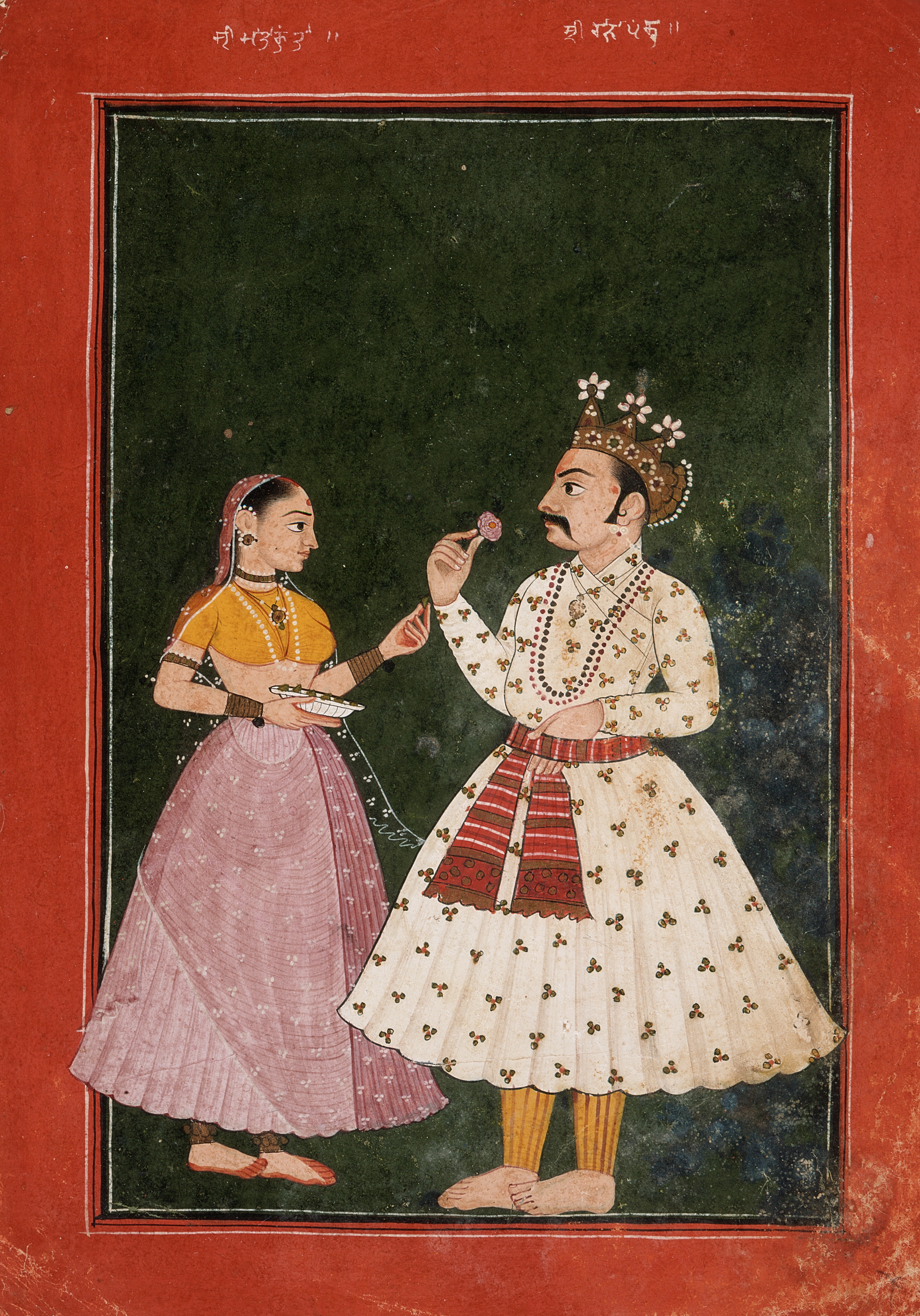
A late 17th-century painting of Pandu and Kunti from Kashmir

Kuntibhoja organised Kunti's svayamvara. Kunti chose King Pandu of Hastinapura, making her the Queen of Hastinapura. Soon after, during his mission to expand his empire, Pandu, on Bhishma's proposal, married Madri, a princess of Madra in order to secure the vassalage of Madra. Kunti was disturbed by her husband's actions, but eventually reconciled with him and treated Madri as a sister.

Pandu, while hunting in a forest, mistakenly shot and killed Rishi Kindama and his wife as they had taken the form of deer to mate. The dying sage then cursed him to die if he tries to embrace or touch his wives. Pandu renounced the kingdom and went into exile with Kunti and Madri.

Pandu could not sire children with his wives due to the curse by sage Kindama. A remorseful Pandu met some sages and asked them a way for heaven and salvation. They said, without children, one can never aspire for heaven. When Pandu expressed to Kunti his despair at the prospect of dying childless, she mentioned the boon granted to her. He happily advised her to beget children by suitable, illustrious men. Thus, Kunti used the boon granted to her by Sage Durvasa to bear three sons—Yudhishthira by Dharmaraja – god of Justice; Bhima by Vayu – god of wind, and Arjuna by Indra – the king of Svarga (Heaven). She also invoked Ashvins for Madri on her behest and Madri gave birth to twin sons, Nakula and Sahadeva.

Kunti gave special care to Madreyas (sons of Madri) especially Sahadeva, the youngest one. Madri gave tribute to Kunti by saying

"You are blessed. There is none like you you are my light, my guide, most respect-worthy, reater in status, purer in virtue."

=== Widowhood ===
One day, Pandu, forgetting his curse, attempted to embrace his wife Madri. But, as a result of Kindama's curse, he died. Madri committed suicide out of remorse that caused her husband's death. Kunti was left helpless in the forest with her children.

After the death of Pandu and Madri, Kunti took care of all five Pandava children taking them back to Hastinapur. Dhritrashtra's sons never liked them. During their childhood, Duryodhana poisoned and tried to kill Bhima but he was saved. Kunti was hurt by this but was consoled by Vidura. Later the Kuru princes were sent to train under Drona.

=== Hiding ===
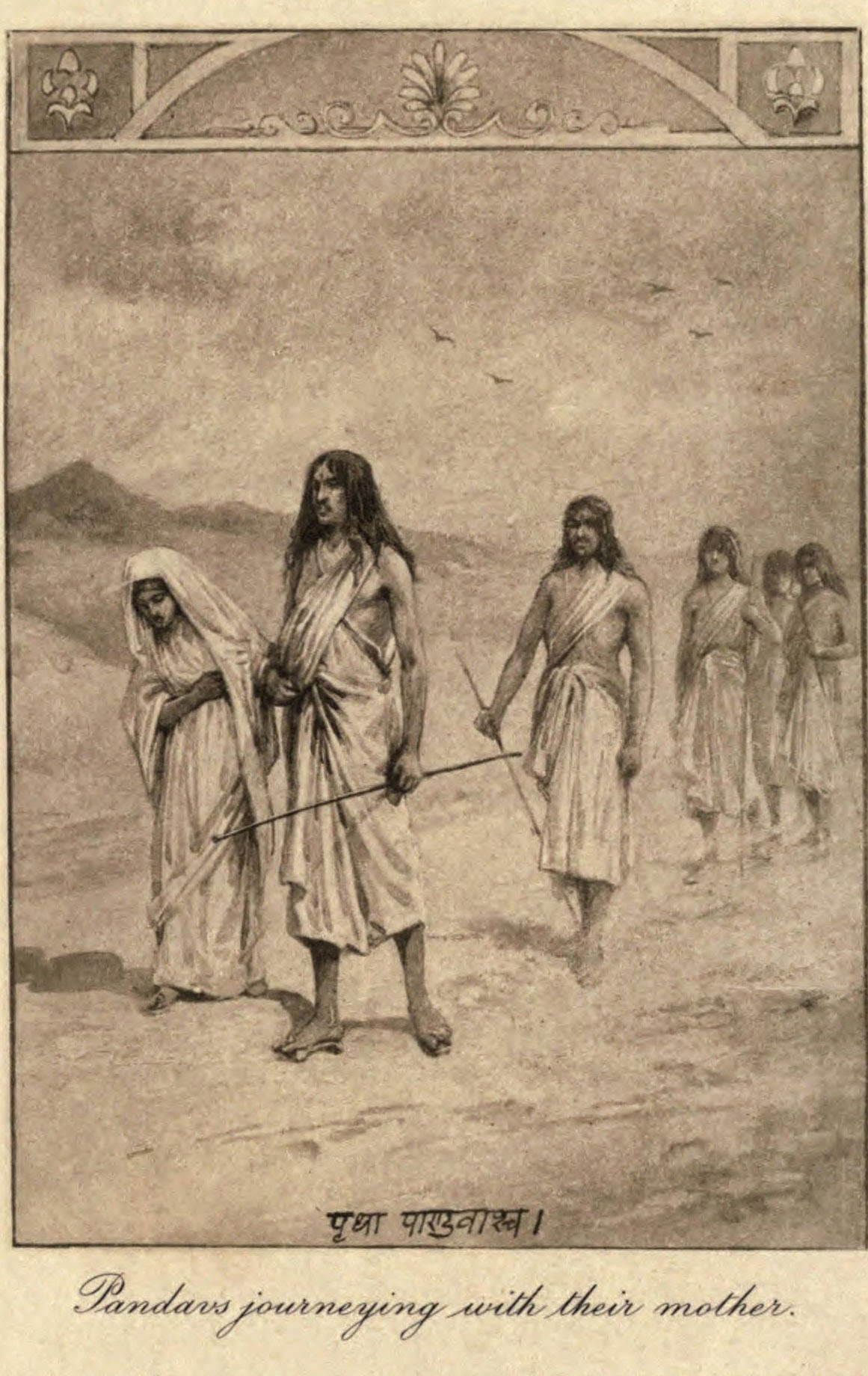
The Pandavas travelling with their mother, Kunti

After the princes finished their training, they returned to Hastinapura. After some time Duryodhana and his maternal uncle Shakuni tried to burn Pandavas alive along with Kunti for which they built the palace out of lac (Lakshagriha) in a village named Varanāvata. The Pandavas, though, managed to escape the house of lac with the help of Vidura through a secret tunnel.

After surviving from the Lakshagriha Kunti and five Pandavas lived in Ekachakra village. During their stay, Kunti and the Pandavas become aware of a demon, Bakasura, who ate people. Villagers had to send one member of their family and food to Bakasura, who devour both. When Kunti heard the cries of a Brahmin – who had provided her and her son's shelter in Ekachakra, Kunti consoled him and suggested that instead of a Brahmin's family, her son Bhima would face the demon. Kunti engineered a plot where Bhima would be able to face and kill the demon. The powerful Bhima brought his might to the fore and defeated Bakasura. Later, Bhima slays the rakshasa Hidimba and he is beseeched by Hidimbi, Hidimba's sister, to wed her. Bhima is reluctant, but Kunti ordered Bhima to marry Hidimbi seeing merit in the woman. Hidimbi would go on to birth Ghatotkacha, who later takes part in the Kurukshetra War.

The Pandavas attended the swayamvara of Draupadi in Panchala. Arjuna was able to win Draupadi's hand. The Pandavas returned to their hut and said that they have bought alms (signifying Kanyadan). Kunti misunderstood them and asked the Pandavas to share whatever they had brought. Kunti was shocked after realizing the implications of her words, that is, all of the Pandavas married Draupadi thinking that they are obeying their mother's orders. Therefore, she scolded her children for treating a woman like alms. However, Draupadi accepted this as her fate.

=== Role in the events of Hastinapura ===
When Kunti, along with the Pandavas and Draupadi, returned to Hastinapura, they faced many problems including succession dispute between Yudhishthira and Duryodhana. On the advice of Bhishma, Pandavas were given a barren land to rule which was developed into Indraprastha.

When the Pandavas lose the kingdom in a dice game and are forced to go into exile for thirteen years, Kunti is forced by King Dhritarashtra to remain in the capital. She chose to stay in Vidura's house rather than the royal palace.

=== Reconciliation with Karna ===
As war approached, Kunti met Karna and in desperation to keep her all children alive, asked Karna to leave the side of Duryodhana and join the Pandavas. Karna denied the offer, as he could not betray his friend. However, he promised Kunti that he would not kill any of his brothers except Arjuna, thus following both Mitra dharma and Putra dharma. He also promised that at the end of the war she would still have five sons, the fifth one be either Arjuna or Karna himself.

Despite supporting her children, Kunti stayed in the Kaurava camp along with her sister-in-law Gandhari. After the death of Karna, Kunti disclosed the secret of Karna's birth to the Pandavas. A grief-stricken Yudhisthira would curse the women of the world that they shall be unable to keep any secret anymore.

=== Later life and death ===
After the Kurukshetra War, Kunti lived with her sons for many years. After she felt that her job in the world was over, she moved to a forest near the Himalayas with her brothers-in-law Vidura and Dhritarashtra, Sanjaya and Dhritarashtra's wife Gandhari. Vidura died two years after they left. Later Sanjaya left for the Himalayas and those remaining perished in a forest fire.

== Assessment ==
According to J. A. B. van Buitenen, translator of the Critical Edition, Kunti is depicted largely self-effacing, conforming to her role as wife and mother, though she asserts herself at key moments.

Pradip Bhattacharya, a scholar of the Mahabharata and author of Panchakanya: "One-in Herself" Why Kunti Remains a Kanya, highlights her as a symbol of strong womanhood, noting her resolve, adaptability, and the critical role she played in her sons’ lives. Kunti’s agency is first demonstrated in her selection of Pandu at her svayamvara and her subsequent loyalty in following him into exile, despite his marriage to Madri. When Pandu requests that Kunti conceive sons through other men, she initially resists, revealing her personal integrity and resolve. She ultimately agrees, however, the choice of divine progenitors is not hers; it rests with Pandu, underlining the limitations of her autonomy within her marriage. Bhattacharya emphasizes her strength and strategic wisdom in managing this role, as she conceals her pre-marital son, Karna, to safeguard Pandu’s honor and to preserve her reputation within the royal household. This contrasts her with her grandmother-in-law, Satyavati, who called upon her pre-marital son Vyasa to extend the royal line of Hastinapura without hesitation. Her refusal to bear a fourth child, invoking scripture as justification, showcases her deep understanding of dharma, which she uses both to assert her autonomy and to protect her dignity.

Within the complex social structure of the Hastinapura court, Kunti carefully navigates adversities, often relying on her confidant Vidura. Bhattacharya highlights her strategic acumen in orchestrating Draupadi’s marriage to all five Pandavas, ensuring unity among her sons and forestalling potential conflicts. This decision, based on customs of the “northern Kurus,” is portrayed as a calculated move that consolidates family loyalty by centering it around a single wife, underscoring Kunti’s commitment to her sons’ shared purpose. Her pragmatism as a mother is further reflected in her morally complex actions to protect her family’s welfare, as seen in her plea to Karna before the war, where she secures his promise to spare all the Pandavas except Arjuna. Though Karna rejects her, Kunti’s determination to shield her sons from harm exemplifies her selfless devotion and emotional resilience.

Kunti’s final retreat to the forest with Dhritarashtra and Gandhari, after her sons’ victory, symbolises a profound act of renunciation. Bhattacharya interprets this as Kunti’s transcendence beyond worldly attachments and family ties, an act that affirms her as a “kanya” or “one-in-herself”—a woman who has achieved independence of spirit and self-possession. Through this retreat, Kunti’s life comes full circle, as she embodies the archetype of the empowered single mother who navigates the vicissitudes of life with resilience and fortitude.
