= Ugrasena =

King of Mathura in Hindu scriptures

- Texts: Mahabharata, Puranas

Information
- Title: King of Mathura
- Family: Ahuka (father)
- Children: Kamsa (son)
- Home: Surasena Kingdom
- Dynasty: Yaduvamsha
- Clan: Vrishni

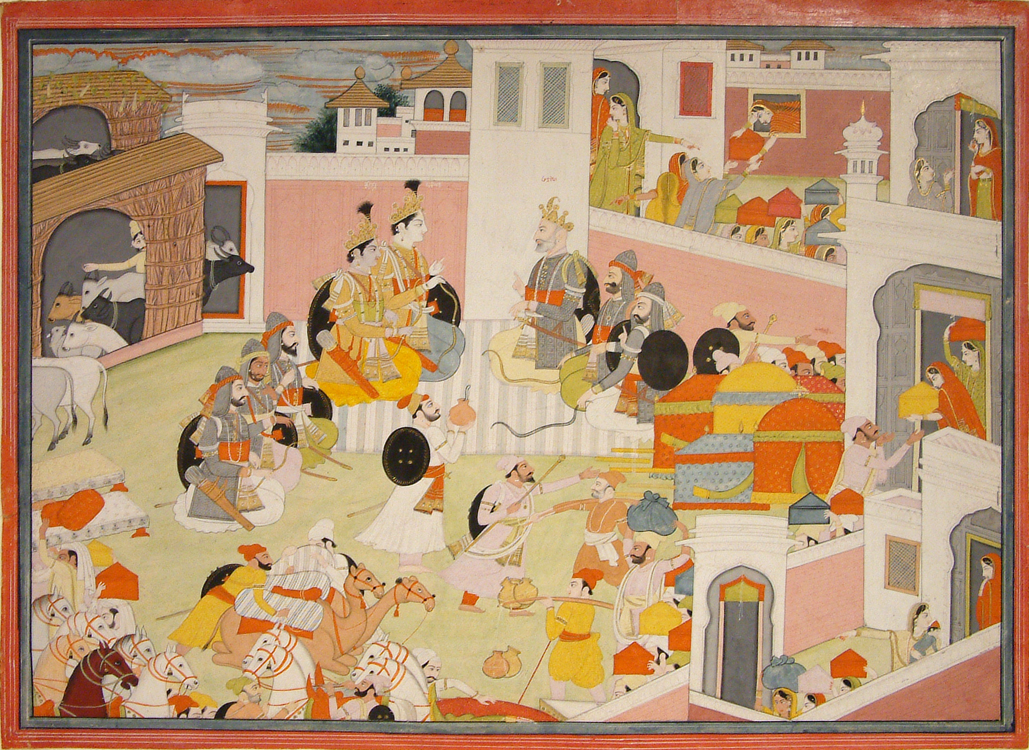
Balarama and Krishna being received at the court of the King Ugrasena at Mathura

Ugrasena (Sanskrit: उग्रसेन) is a character mentioned in the Hindu epic, Mahabharata. He is the King of Mathura, a kingdom that was established by the Vrishni tribes from the Yadava clan. His son Kamsa was a cousin of Krishna's mother, Devaki. King Ugrasena was overthrown by Kamsa, and was sentenced to life in prison, along with Kamsa's cousin, Devaki, and her husband, Vasudeva. Krishna reinstalled Ugrasena as the ruler of Mathura once more after defeating his wicked uncle.

== History ==
Ugrasena is believed to be the king of Dvārakā and maternal grandfather of Krishna.

According to the Puranas, Kamsa issued an order for the execution of his own father once he grew paranoid of the valour of Krishna and Balarama in Mathura, observing them slay wild elephants that he had released for their murder. He ordered his father to be thrown in the river Kalindi, bound hand and foot. This was among the many reasons that would lead to his nephew slaying him.

Krishna treated Ugrasena with honour upon his prestigious welcome and reception to the city of Mathura:

O king, informed of your intention I say that you are the king of Mathura. Do not make it otherwise. O king, I will confer upon you your proper share in the land and gift. As I did with the other kings I had kept your share in reserve beforehand, one hundred thousandth portion without any ornaments or raiment. O king, get upon your white car adorned with gold, umbrella, fans, flags and celestial ornaments. And wearing your crown of sunny lustre govern the city of Mathura, delightedly with your sons and grand-sons, defeat your enemies and multiply the Bhoja race. The king of gods, the holder of thunder-bolt sent, for Ananta and Shouri, celestial ornaments and raiments. From the thousand jars of gold coins reserved for the citizens of Mathura in that ceremony of installation the king of gods has ordered that one thousand should be given to each of the panegyrists and bards, one hundred to each old man, prostitute and other men and ten thousand to each of the Yadavas, Vikadru and others who live with the king Ugrasena.

— Harivamsa Purana, Chapter 56

Samba, the son of Krishna and great-grand son of Ugrasena, had insulted several sages by disguising himself as a pregnant woman and asked the sages to ascertain the baby's gender. The sages cursed him to deliver an iron rod, which was to cause the annihilation of his entire clan. The Yadavas reported these tidings to Ugrasena, who had the rod turned into powder, and thrown into the sea. He also prohibited liquor in his kingdom. Sometime, after this incident he died and attained heaven. He, along with Bhurishravas, Shalya, Uttara and his brother Shankha, Vasudeva, Bhuri, Kamsa, joined the company of devas in heaven.

Jain tradition holds that the Neminatha's marriage was arranged with Rajulakumari or Rajimati or Rajamati, daughter of Ugrasena. He is believed to have heard animal cries as they were being slaughtered for the marriage feast. Taken over by sorrow and distress at the sight, he is believed to have given up the desire of getting married, and to have become a monk and gone to Mount Girnar. His bride-to-be Rajulakumari is believed to have followed him, becoming a nun and his brother Rahanemi became a monk, joining his ascetic order.

== Personality ==
In contrast to his son Kamsa, Ugrasena is described as a conscientious and capable ruler, and a great devotee of Vishnu. The Vishnu Purana states that the city of Mathura was "well presided over by Ugrasena, and abounded in a happy population both of men and women".
