= Kamsa =

King of Mathura in Hindu scriptures

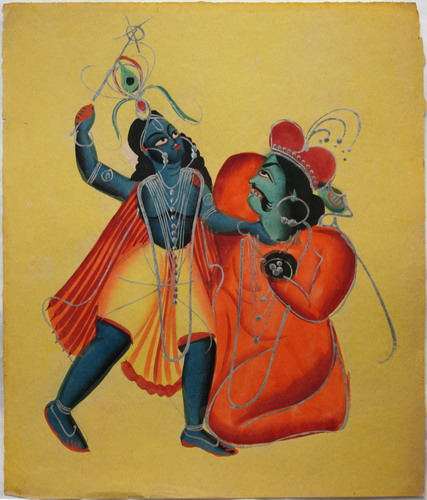
- 19th century Kalighat Painting of Krishna killing Kamsa
- Texts: Mahabharata, Puranas

Information
- Title: King of Mathurā
- Family: Ugrasena (father); Padmavati (mother)
- Spouses: Asti; Prapti; (daughters of Jarasandha)
- Relatives: Vasudeva (brother-in-law); Krishna (nephew); Balarama (nephew); Jarasandha (father-in-law)
- Home: Surasena Kingdom
- Dynasty: Yaduvamsha
- Clan: Vrishni

Kamsa (Sanskrit: कंस, IAST: Kaṃsa) was the tyrant ruler of the Vrishni kingdom, with its capital at Mathura. He is variously described in Hindu literature as either a human or an asura. The Puranas describe him as an asura, while the Harivamśa describes him as an asura reborn in the body of a man. His royal house was called Bhoja; thus, another of his names was Bhojapati. He was the brother of Devaki, the mother of the deity Krishna; Krishna ultimately fulfilled a prophecy by slaying Kamsa.

Kamsa was born to King Ugrasena and Queen Padmavati. However, out of ambition, and upon the advice of his personal confidantes, Banasura and Narakasura, Kamsa decided to overthrow his father, and install himself as the King of Mathura. Therefore, upon the guidance of another advisor, Chanura, Kamsa decided to marry Asti and Prapti, the daughters of Jarasandha, King of Magadha.

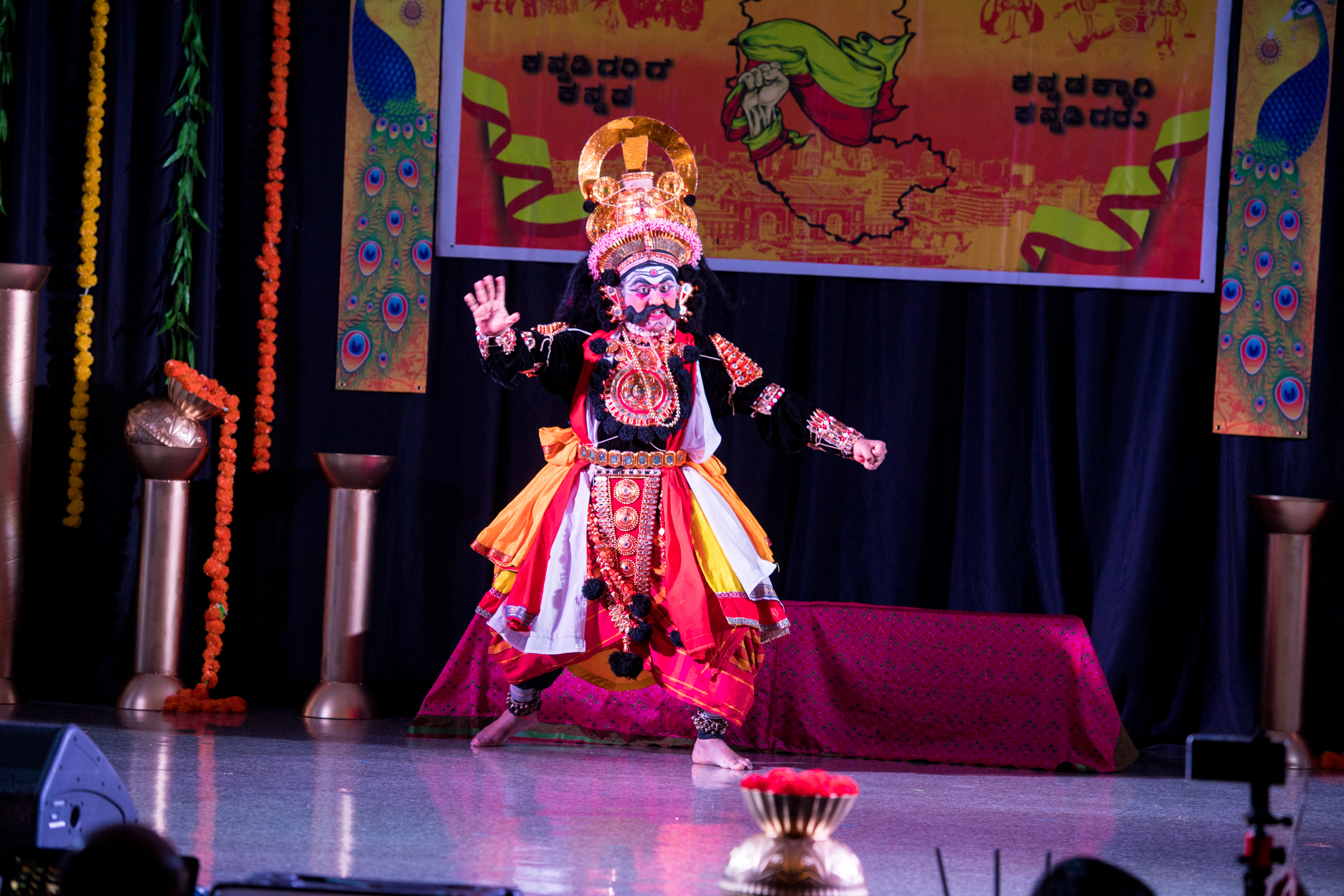
Kamsa as depicted in Yakshagana, a traditional Indian art form from southern state of Karnataka

After a heavenly voice prophesied that Devaki's eighth son would slay him, Kamsa imprisoned Devaki and her husband Vasudeva, and killed all of their children; however, just before the birth of the seventh child of Devaki and Vasudeva, Vishnu ordered the goddess Mahamaya to transfer the child from the womb of Devaki to that of Rohini, another wife of Vasudeva. Soon, Rohini gave birth to Devaki's seventh son, named Balarama. The eighth son, Krishna, an avatar of Vishnu, was transported to the village of Gokula, where he was raised in the care of Nanda, the head of the cowherds. Learning of his birth, Kamsa sent a host of asuras to kill the child Krishna, but Krishna killed every one of them. Finally, Krishna arrived in Mathura and slew his uncle, Kamsa.

== Birth and early life ==
Kamsa was in his previous birth a demon called Kalanemi, who was slain by the god Vishnu. Kamsa is generally described as the son of the Yadava ruler, Ugrasena. However, some texts such as the Padma Purana state that Kamsa was not the biological son of Ugrasena. In this story, the wife of Ugrasena (named Padmavati in some texts) is seen by a supernatural being named Dramila, who transforms himself into the form of Ugrasena and inseminates her. Realizing this duplicity, Padmavati curses Drumila to hell for his sin. She soon becomes pregnant with a son, whom she also curses be killed by a member of his family. After the son is born, Ugrasena adopts him and names him Kamsa.

In childhood, Kamsa's deeds are described in great detail in Canto 1 of Garga Samhita. He was born with immense strength and fought wrestlers as a child. During Jarasandha's conquest, the elephant Kuvalayapida broke free and encroached the arena where Kamsa was wrestling. Kamsa subdued the elephant and flung it into Jarasandha's army 80 miles away. Jarasandha was so impressed, he made Kamsa his son in law and gifted him with 100 million horses, 300000 chariots, 100000 elephants including Kuvalayapida, and 10,000 maidservants as dowry. Kamsa once uprooted the Mahendra mountain hundred times, which offended Sage Parashurama. Kamsa effortlessly strung Parashurama's Vaishnava bow and then surrendered before the sage, pacifying him. Parashurama gifted Kamsa with the bow, granting him a boon that only the one who breaks the bow shall slay him. Subsequently, Kamsa vanquished many Daityas like Narakasura, Banasura, Dwivida, Arishta, Aghasura. He also invaded Amaravati and defeated Indra and Varuna.

== Annexation of kingdom ==
During his wedding in Mathura, Jarasandha brought over his army to escort the Princesses Asti and Prapti. Using the army of Magadha as his political cover, Kamsa overthrew his father after he refused to voluntarily retire from his position. This was done within the confines of the royal palace and the public was not informed. After Ugrasena failed to show up for public events, Kamsa announced his coronation.

== Warning issued by Yogamāyā ==
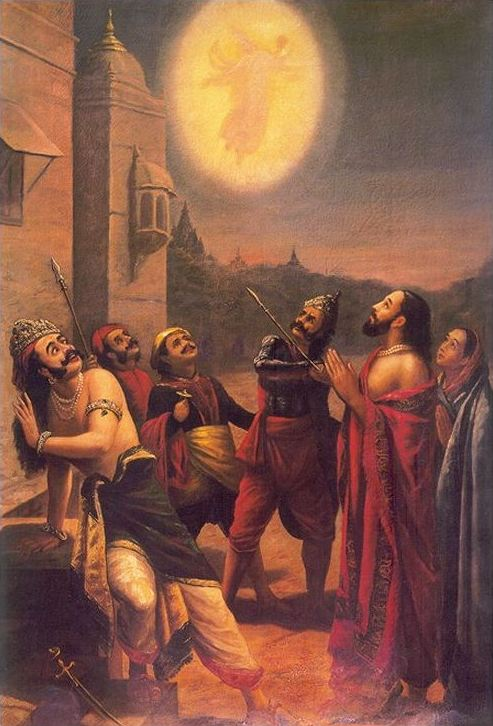
A frightened Kaṃsa (left) looks up to the goddess, as she issues the warning.

Kaṃsa intended to kill his cousin Devakī, fearing the prophecy that her eighth child was fated to kill him. Vasudeva managed to save his wife's life by promising Kaṃsa that he would deliver all their children to the latter. Kaṃsa accepted this proposition and spared Devakī because she herself was not a threat to him. In the confines of the prison, Devakī repeatedly conceived and Kaṃsa cruelly murdered the first six children.

Before the seventh child was born, Vishnu ordered the goddess Yogamāyā to transfer the seventh child of Devaki into the womb of Rohini. This child would be raised by his surrogate mother, Rohini, and named Balarama, Krishna's elder brother. Yogamaya was tasked to be born as the daughter of Yashoda. Immediately preceding the birth of Krishna, the goddess rendered the guards of Kamsa unconscious. When Krishna was born to Devaki, heeding the deity's instructions, Vasudeva carried the infant to Nanda and Yashoda's house, swapping him with their infant daughter, Yogamaya. Presuming the infant to be Devaki's eighth child, Kamsa prepared to murder her, but the girl slipped out of his hands. Assuming her true form, Yogamāyā proclaimed to Kaṃsa, "The eighth child, who shall kill you, has been born. He is in Gokula!"

== Death ==
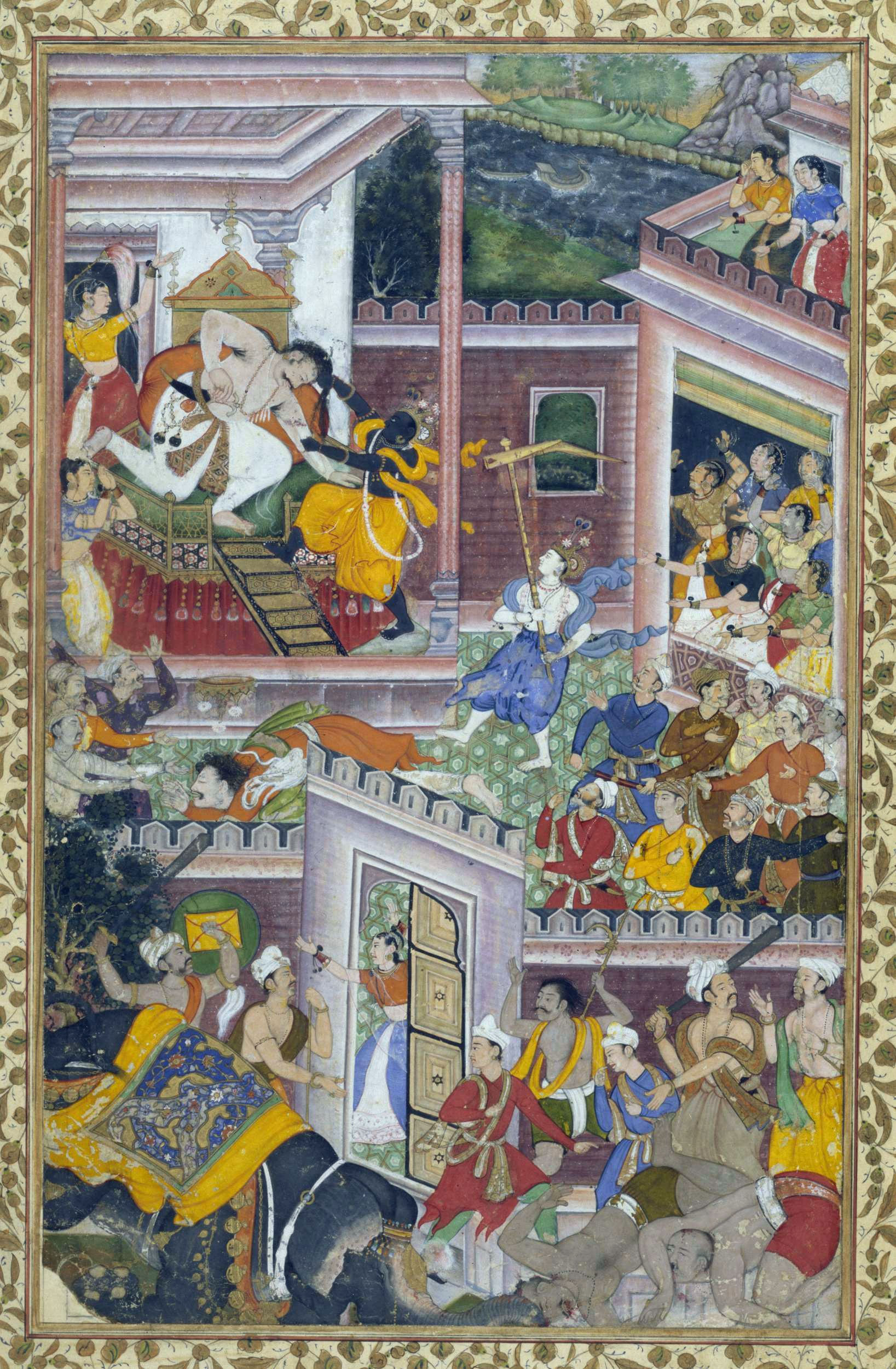
Krishna kills Kamsa

The seventh child, Balarama, was saved when he was moved to Rohini's womb. The eighth child born to Devaki and Vasudeva was Krishna. Krishna was saved from Kamsa's wrath and raised by Vasudeva's relative Nanda and Yasoda, a cowherd couple.

After Krishna grew up and returned to the kingdom, Kamsa was eventually killed and beheaded by Krishna, as was originally predicted by the divine prophecy. His eight brothers, headed by Kanka, were also killed by Balarama. Following this, Ugrasena was reinstated as the King of Mathura.

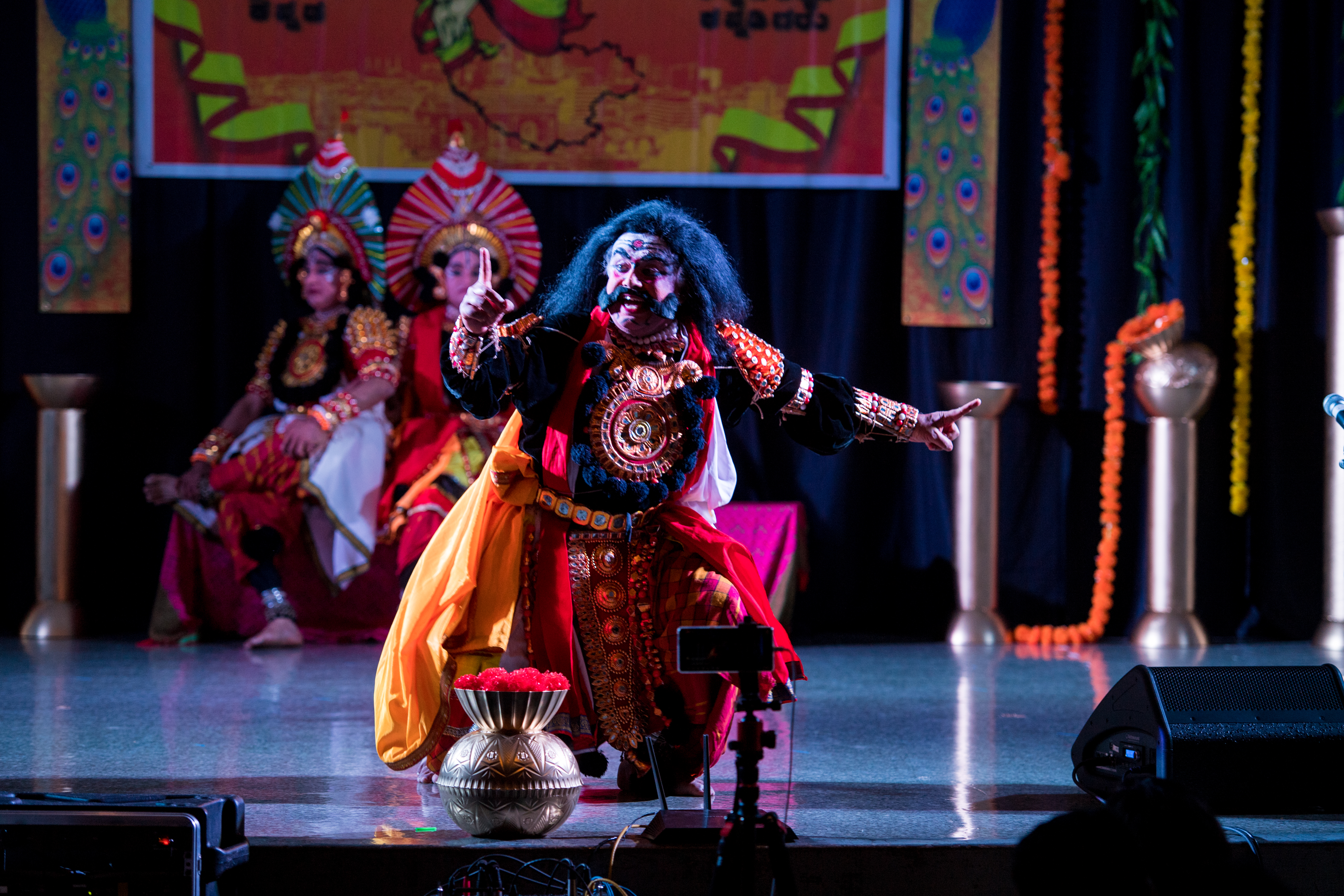
Krishna, Balarama, Kamsa as depicted in Yakshagana
