= Devaki =

Mother of the Hindu god Krishna

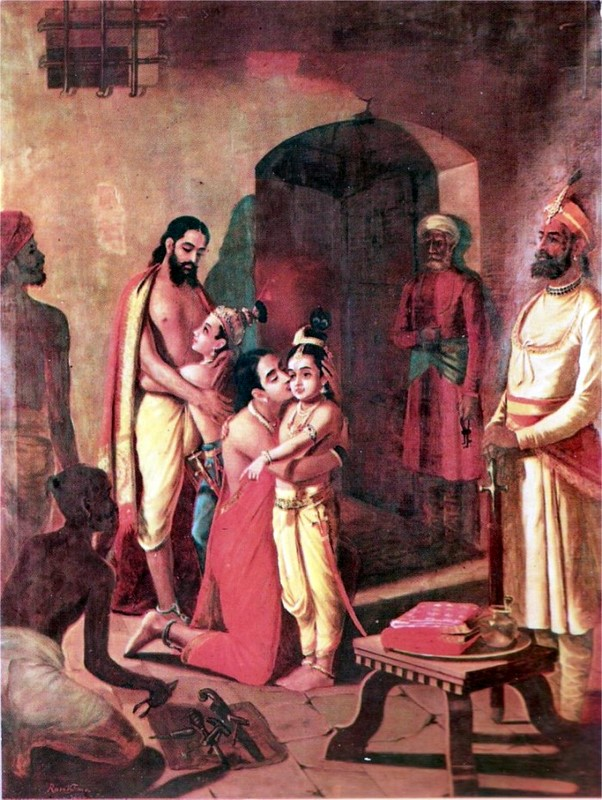
- Krishna and Balarama meet their parents (Painting by Raja Ravi Varma)
- Devanagari: देवकी
- Venerated in: Vaishnavism
- Affiliation: Aditi
- Texts: Bhagavata Purana, Mahabharata

Genealogy
- Parents: Devaka (father)
- Siblings: Dhrtadeva, Santideva, Upadeva, Srideva, Devaraksita, and Sahadeva (sisters); Vidura's wife (half-sister); Devavana, Upadeva, Sudeva, Devavardhana (brothers)
- Spouse: Vasudeva
- Children: Balarama and Krishna (sons); Subhadra (step-daughter); Sadgarbha (first six children) (Note: Devaki bore eight children, but the first six were killed by her brother Kamsa upon their birth. Balarama was conceived by Devaki, but he was transferred into the womb of Rohini by the goddess Yogamaya.)
- Dynasty: Yaduvamsha

Devaki (Sanskrit: देवकी, IAST: Devakī) is a character in Hindu literature, most noted for being the mother of the god Krishna. She is one of the seven daughters of Devapa or Devaka, a king of the Yadu dynasty, and has four brothers. She is one of the wives of Vasudeva. Her cousin is Kamsa, the king of Mathura, a cruel tyrant who had been told by Narada that he had been an asura killed by Vishnu in his previous life (Kalanemi), exacerbating his wickedness. According to popular tradition, Devaki is considered to be an incarnation of Aditi, a mother goddess who was the daughter of Daksha and the wife of Kashyapa.

== Etymology ==
Devaki is the feminine form of the Sanskrit word Devaka (देवक), which itself is a derivative of the root Deva (देव). It carries the meaning primarily "celestial" or "divine," by deva, meaning "god," "heavenly," or "shining one." There is also another meaning for this word in Vedic literature - "one who sports" or "one who plays." The suffix -की (-kī) is added to the masculine stem Devaka, to form this feminine word, which eventually means "she who is divine" or "the celestial one.".

== Marriage ==
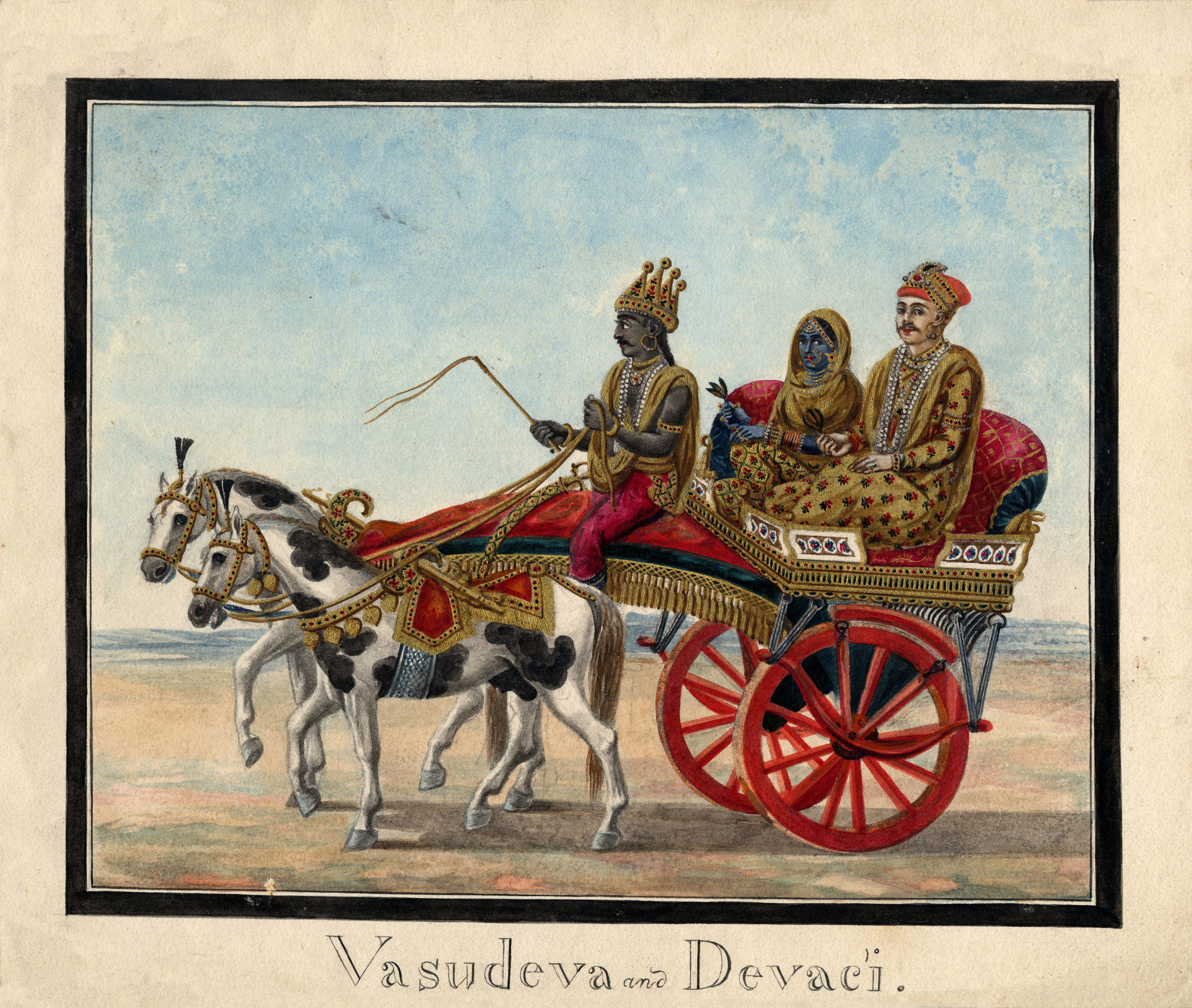
Vasudeva and Devaki traveling in a carriage

During the nuptials of Vasudeva and Devaki following the former's wedding with his bride's six older sisters, Vishnu picked a lock of hair from his mount Shesha as well as his own, proclaiming that they would be born as Devaki's seventh and eighth children, respectively. After the marriage ceremony, Kamsa volunteered to escort the newly-weds to Mathura and drove their chariot. A celestial voice, an akashvani, prophesied that the eighth child of Devaki would become Kamsa's death, and deliver the land from his wickedness. Angered, Kamsa rose to kill Devaki, but was stopped by Vasudeva, who promised to give each child to Kamsa, whom he would subsequently kill.

== Imprisonment ==
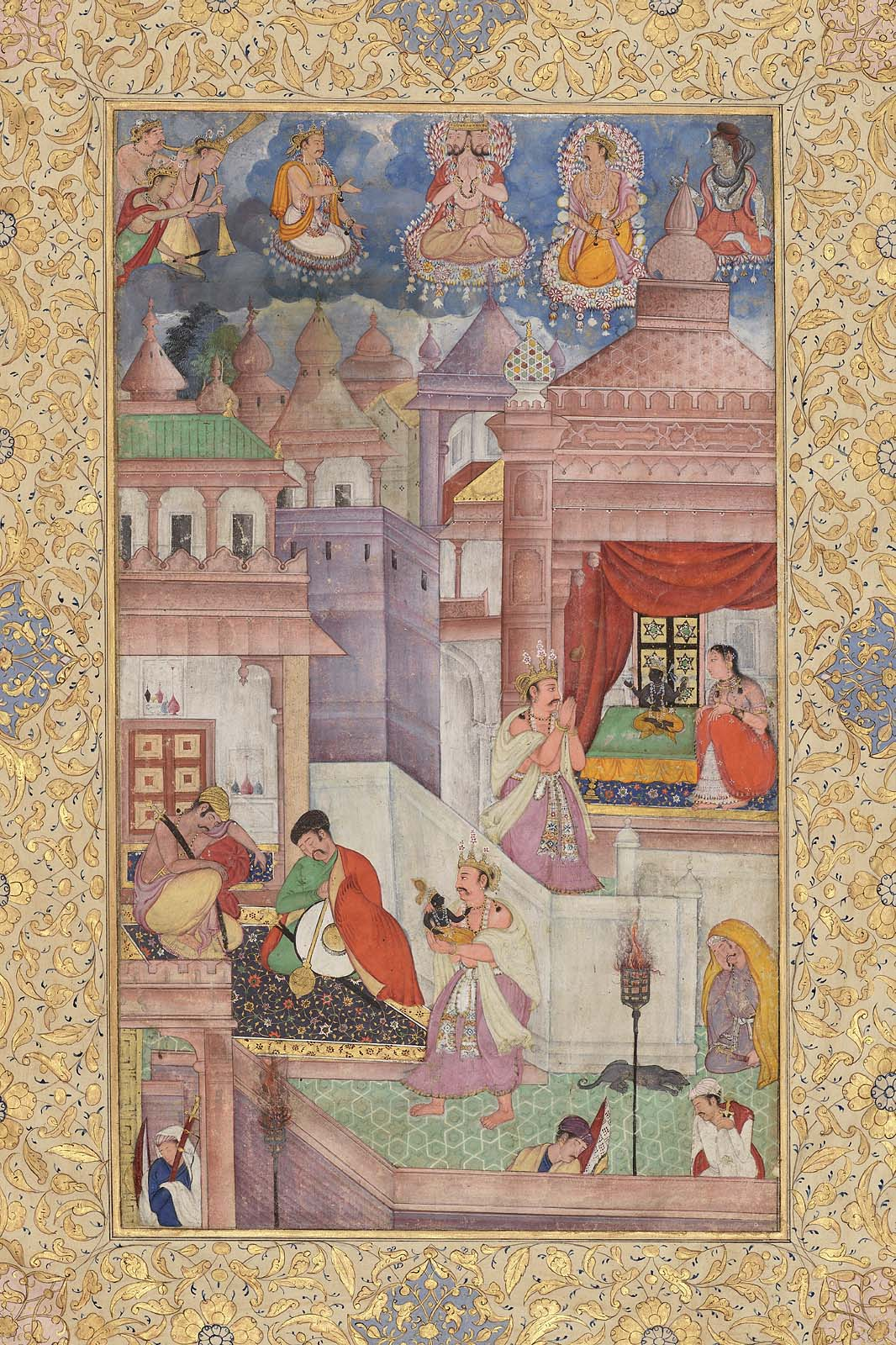
Birth and escape of Krishna.

Devaki and Vasudeva were imprisoned by Kamsa due to the paranoia that had taken root in the tyrant's mind. Her six children were killed, while the seventh Balarama survived after being transferred by divine will into the uterus of Rohini, one of the other wives of Vasudeva.

Devaki's six dead sons were named Kírttimat, Sushena, Udayin, Bhadrasena, Rijudasa, and Bhadradeha. According to the Harivamsa, they were the reincarnations of the sons of the asura Kalanemi. They had performed intense austerities to worship the creator deity Brahma, unbeknownst to their own grandfather, Hiranyakashipu. The latter, furious at their actions, cursed them to be born on earth and be slain by Kamsa, who himself was a form of their father.

Devaki soon mothered Balarama through the surrogacy of Rohini.

When Devaki delivered Krishna, he revealed his divine form to his parents, and ordered Vasudeva to take him to Gokulam, placing all the prison guards under a spell of slumber, so that Kamsa would not realise that his prophesied killer had been born. Vasudeva swapped Krishna with Yogamaya, the daughter who had been born to Nanda and Yashoda on the very same day, and returned to the cell.

When Kamsa stormed into the chamber after the spell had worn out, he deduced that Devaki had given birth to a girl. Devaki protested against the killing of the daughter of Nanda and Yashoda, but Kamsa hurled her against a rock, recognising that the gender of his prophesied slayer had not been specified. Yashoda's daughter transformed into an eight-armed goddess, and stated, "Fool, your destroyer has already been born elsewhere." She subsequently vanished into the heavens.

Devaki and Vasudeva's imprisonment came to an end after Kamsa's death.

== Salvation to the Sadgarbhas ==
Devaki, upon hearing how Krishna restored his Guru Sandipani's son, wished to see her own children. Krishna acceded her request and brought the children to Devaki from Patala. She nursed them with her milk and they attained heaven.

== Death ==
After the passing of Vasudeva after the Yadu massacre, Devaki cremated herself on Vasudeva's pyre, performing sati, along with his other wives, Rohini, Bhadra, and Madira.

== Worship ==
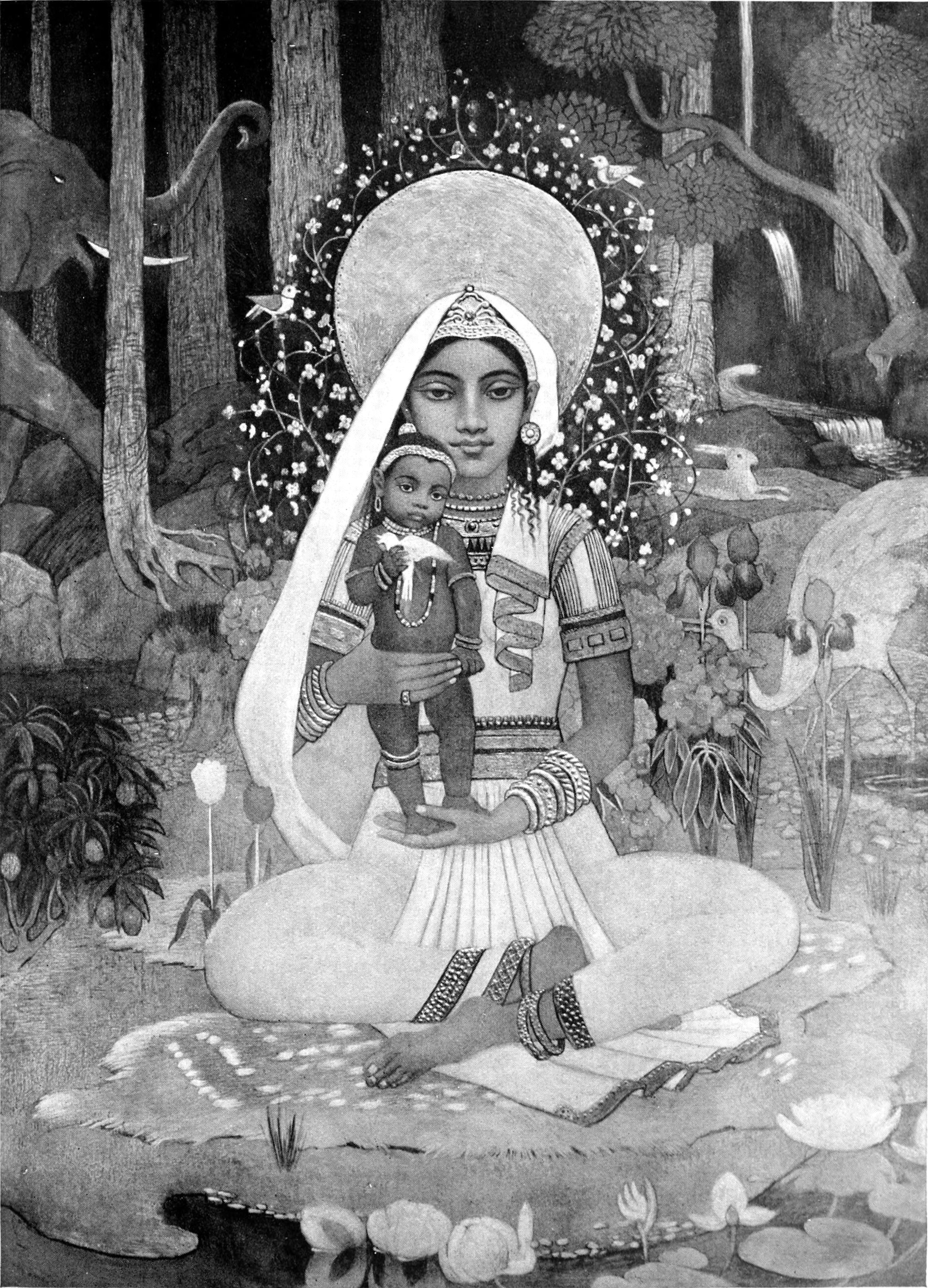
A painting of Devaki with Krishna

In the state of Goa, Devaki Krishna Sansthan temple is a unique temple, perhaps is the only temple in India where Krishna is worshiped alongside mother Devaki. The main deity Devakikrishna and affiliate deities of Bhumika Devi, Laxmi Ravalnath, Mallinath, Katyayani, Chodaneshwar and Dhada Shankar were originally located at Choodamani island (Chorão island of today). To avoid persecution during the Goa Inquisition they were taken to Mayem in Bicholim and from there shifted to the present location at Mashel. The garbhagriha (inner sanctum) of the temple has an idol of Devaki and Krishna. The idol of Devaki is in standing posture holding baby Krishna with her left hand. Mata Devaki is worshipped separately in a small temple dedicated to her inside the Dwarkadhish temple complex in Dwarka, Gujarat.

== See also ==
- Iringole Kavu
- Yogmaya Temple
- Gomanta kingdom
