= Vasudeva =

Father of the Hindu god Krishna

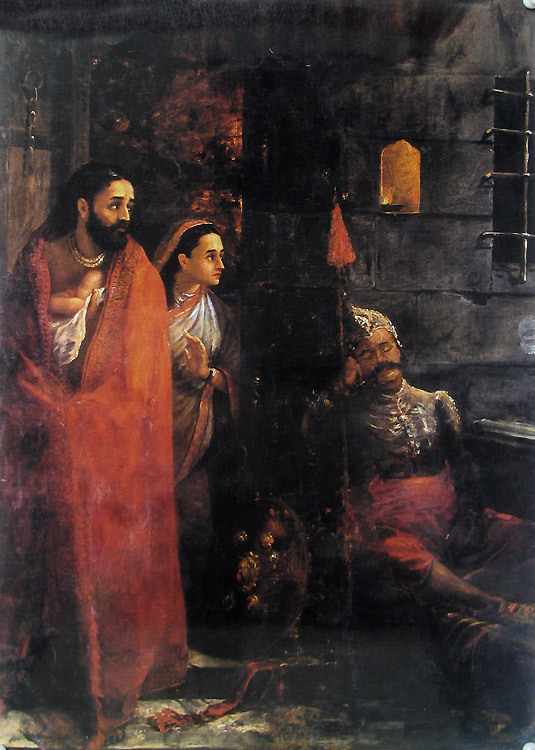
- Vasudeva secretly exits the prison to go to Gokula, a painting by Raja Ravi Varma
- Devanagari: वसुदेव
- Venerated in: Vaishnavism
- Texts: Bhagavata Purana, Harivamsa, Vishnu Purana, Brahma Purana, Mahabharata

Genealogy
- Parents: Marisha (mother); Shurasena (father)
- Spouse: Rohini, Devaki, and various other wives
- Children: Balarama, Krishna, Subhadra, and various other children
- Dynasty: Yaduvamsha

Vasudeva (/ˌvʌsuˈdeɪvə/; Sanskrit: वसुदेव [ʋɐsudéːʋɐ]), also called Anakadundubhi (anakas and dundubhis both refer to drums, after the musicians who played these instruments at the time of his birth), is the father of the Hindu deities Vāsudeva-Krishna, Balarama, and Subhadra. He was a king of the Vrishnis. His sister Kunti was married to Pandu.

"Vasudeva" as an object of worship in Hinduism usually refers to the son Vāsudeva (Krishna), rather than his father Vasudeva.

== Family ==
Vasudeva was born to the king Shurasena in the Surasena kingdom of Khandalwansha. Vasudeva had many brothers such as Devashrava and Devabhaga, and 5 sisters Srutakirti, Kunti, Rajadhidevi, Srutadeva (Mother of the Dantavakra), and Shrutasravas (mother of Shishupala). According to the Harivamsa Purana, Vasudeva and Nanda, the chief of Gokula, are Step-Brothers.

=== Wives and children ===
Vasudeva married Devaki, and also had other wives such as Pauravi Rohini, Madira, Vaishakhi, Bhadra, Sunama, Sahadeva, Shantideva, Shrideva, Devarakshita, Vrikadevi, Upadevi, and Badarva. Rohini bore several sons, namely, Balarama, Sarana and Shatha. Vrikadevi gave birth to Avagaha and Nandaka. By Devaki, he had eight sons–six of whom were killed by Kamsa and the other two being Balarama (transferred into the womb of Rohini) and Krishna. He also had a daughter – Subhadra from Rohini. In some versions of the Bhagavata Purana, Vasudeva also married Sutanu, the princess of Kasi, and they had a son named Paundraka.

=== Descendants ===
Vasudeva traced a number of descendants through his sons. Sarana had many sons like Satyadhriti and Marsti, and Shatha had a son called Sarthi. Balarama married Revati and had two sons – Nishatha and Ulmuka & a daughter – Vatsala/Shashirekha. Krishna had eight principal wives, and he begat many children from them, such as Pradyumna, Samba, Bhanu etc., and they also had many children. Vasudeva's daughter Subhadra married Pandava prince Arjuna, and they had a son Abhimanyu. Ultimately, it was Abhimanyu's son Parikshit who ascended the Kuru throne after Yudhishthira.

Many of the Yadavas killed themselves in the Yadava fratricide. Krishna, Balarama and Vasudeva later gave up their lives, and the Pandavas collected the remaining Yadava children and ladies with them to Indraprastha, where Pradyumma's grandson Vajra was crowned as king of Mathura, and some other survivors also were crowned as kings of different places.(See Mausala Parva).Many migrated southwards and known as vira balija or vir banajiga and created a powerful warrior merchant class of south India and ruled nayaka dynasties.

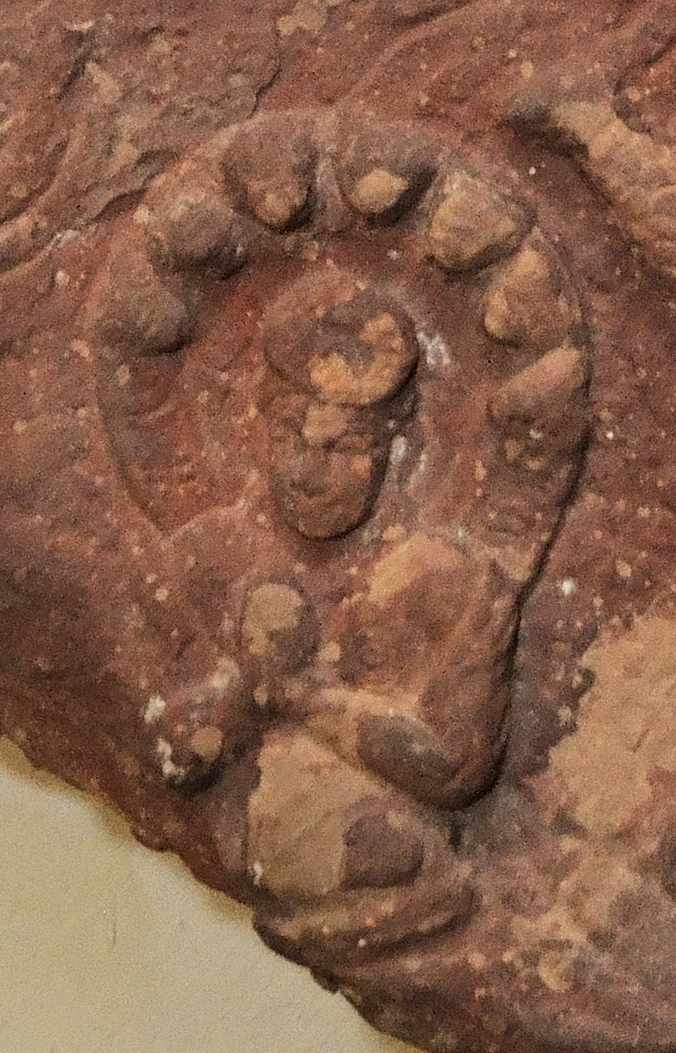
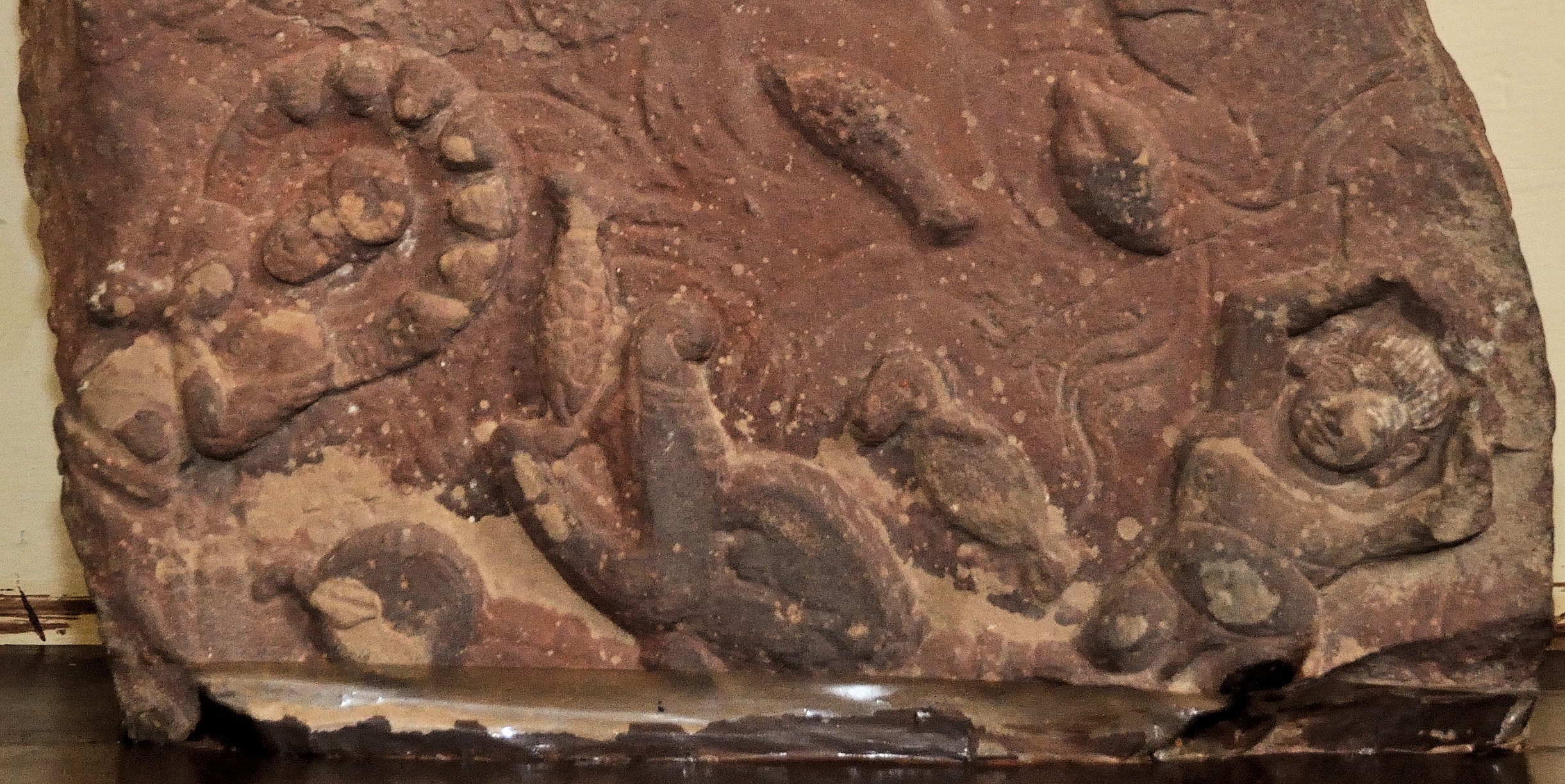
Vasudeva carrying baby Krishna across the Yamuna. Circa 1st Century CE, Gatashram Narayan Temple. Mathura Museum

The sons of Vasudeva were related to Bhagavatism that was largely formed by the 1st-millennium BCE where Vāsudeva (Krishna, the son of Vasudeva) was worshiped as supreme ultimate reality. This is evidenced by texts and archaeological evidence. As textual evidence, the Mahanarayana Upanishad records the verse:

नारायाणाय विद्महे वासुदेवाय धीमहि तन्नो विष्णुः प्रचोदयात्

nārāyāṇāya vidmahē vāsudēvāya dhīmahi tannō viṣṇuḥ pracōdayāt

We endeavor to know Narayana, we meditate on Vāsudeva and Vishnu bestows wisdom on us.

— Mahanarayana Upanishad, Chapter 7

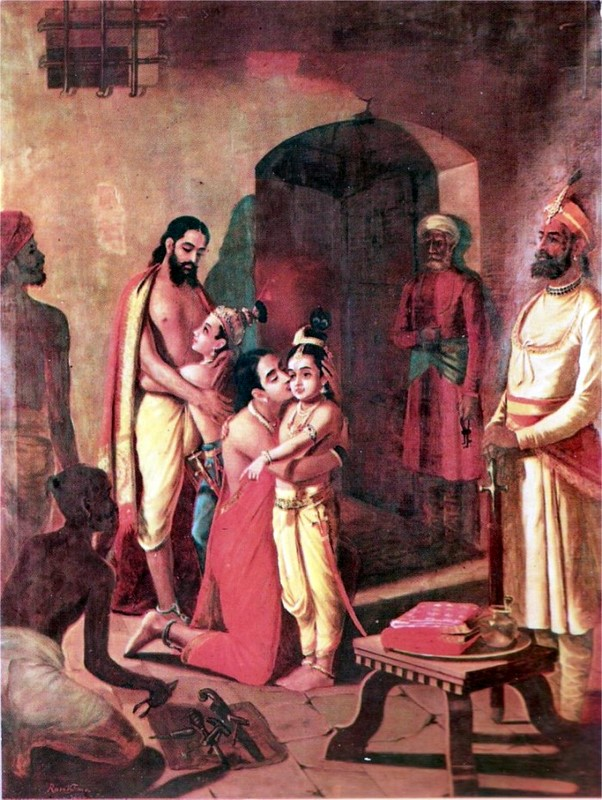
Krishna and Balarama meeting their parents (painting by Raja Ravi Varma)

This verse asserts that Narayana, Vāsudeva (Krishna), and Vishnu are synonymous. The author and the century in which the above Mahanarayana Upanishad was composed is unknown. The relative chronology of the text, based on its poetic verse and textual style, has been proposed by Parmeshwaranand to the same period of composition as Katha, Isha, Mundaka and Shvetashvatara Upanishads, but before Maitri, Prashna and Mandukya Upanishad. Feuerstein places the relative composition chronology of Mahanarayana to be about that of Mundaka and Prashna Upanishads. These relative chronology estimates date the text to second half of 1st millennium BCE. Srinivasan suggests a later date for the composition of the Mahanarayana Upanishad, one after about 300 BCE and probably in the centuries around the start of the common era.

Other evidence is from archeological inscriptions, where Bhagavan is documented epigraphically to be from around 100 BCE, such as in the inscriptions of the Heliodorus pillar. An Indo-Greek ambassador from Taxila named Heliodorus, of this era, visited the court of a Shunga king, and addresses himself as a Bhagavata on this pillar, an epithet scholars consider as evidence of Vāsudeva worship was well established in 1st millennium BCE. A popular short prayer for worshipping Vāsudeva is Dwadashaakshar.

== Kashyapa incarnated as Vasudeva ==
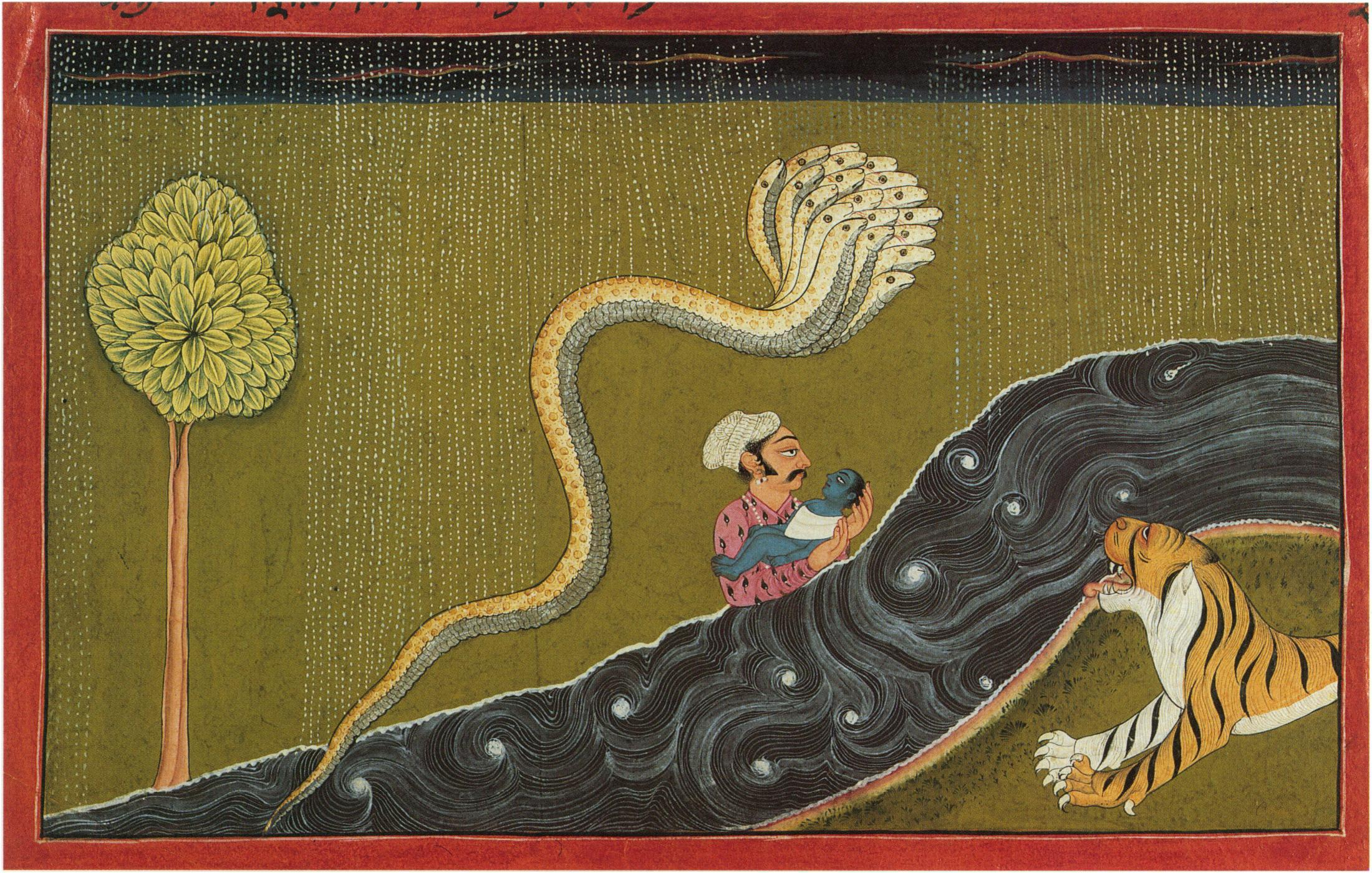
Vasudeva Takes the Infant Krishna Across the Yamuna River. Master at the Court of Mankot, c. 1700. Government Museum and Art Gallery, Chandigarh

Sage Kashyapa is said to have incarnated as Vasudeva, the father of Krishna, due to a curse of the deities Varuna or Brahma.

Once, the sage is said to have performed a yajna (a ritual sacrifice) in his hermitage. Kashyapa sought the help of the god Varuna for the offerings of milk and ghee. Varuna lent the sage a divine cow that would provide him the required offerings. After completing the sacrifice, Kashyapa delayed in returning the cow back to the deity. Varuna cursed the sage and his wife, Aditi, to be born on earth as Vasudeva and Devaki, the parents of Vishnu in his avatar of Krishna.

In other iterations, Kashyapa is stated to have stolen a divine cow from Varuna for the performance of a ritual sacrifice. The deity requested Brahma for his intervention. For his theft of a cow, Brahma cursed Kashyapa to be born on earth as a cowherd. Since his wives, Aditi and Surasa, had assisted him in concealing the cows in his hermitage, they were also born on earth as his two wives, Devaki and Rohini.

== See also ==
- Heliodorus pillar
- Hathibada Ghosundi Inscriptions
- Naneghat
- Vasu Doorjamb Inscription
- Vasudeva Upanishad
