= Subhadra =

Hindu goddess and the sister of the god Krishna

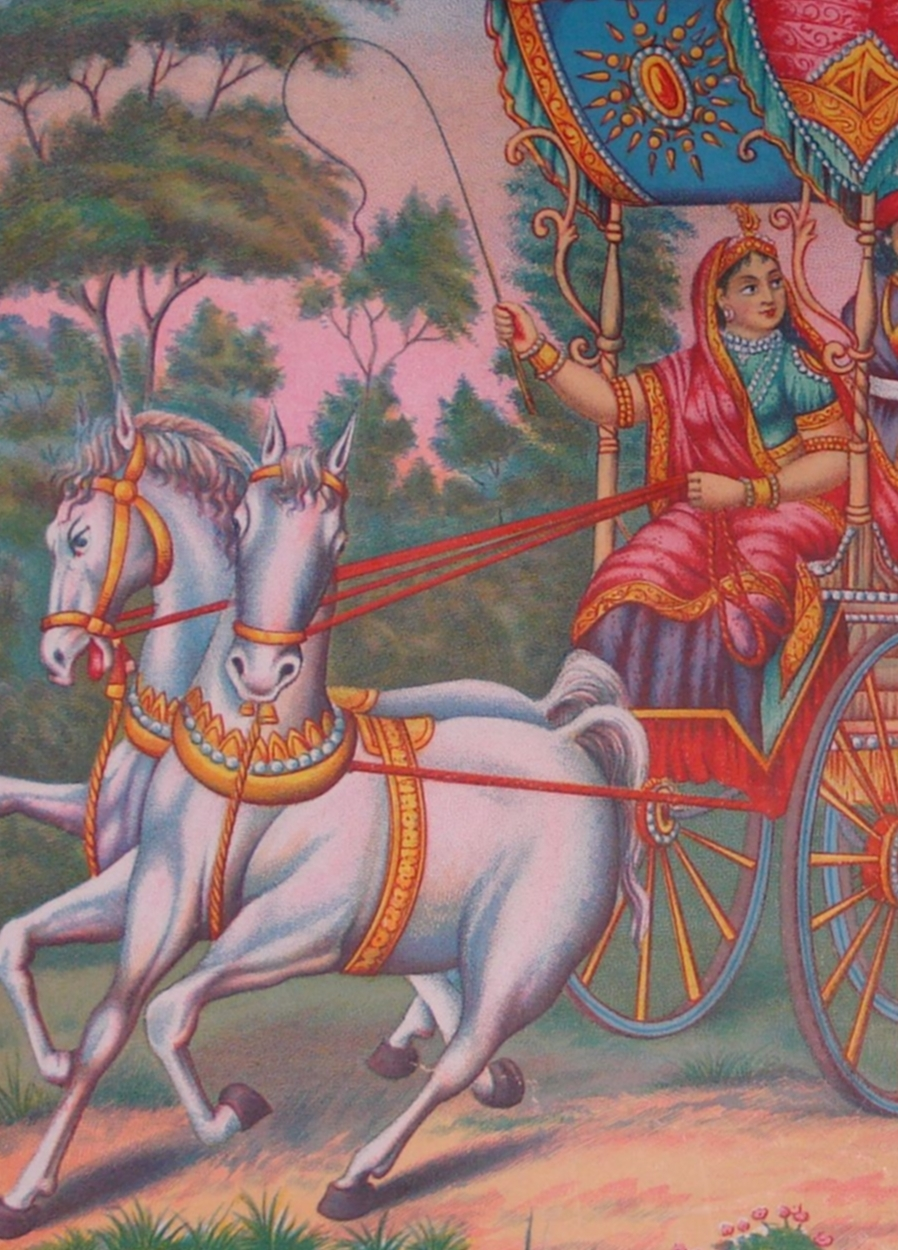
- A 20th century lithograph depicting Subhadra
- Other names: Bhadra, Chitra
- Devanagari: सुभद्रा
- Venerated in: Vaishnavism
- Affiliation: Devi
- Texts: Mahabharata, Bhagavata Purana
- Temple: Jagannath Temple

Genealogy
- Parents: Vasudeva (father); Rohini (mother)
- Siblings: Balarama (half brother); Krishna (half brother); other children of Vasudeva
- Consort: Arjuna
- Children: Abhimanyu
- Dynasty: Yaduvamsha

Subhadra (Sanskrit: सुभद्रा, romanized: Subhadrā, lit. 'auspicious') is a figure in Hindu tradition, particularly revered in Vaishnavism as the half-sister of the deities Krishna and Balarama. She is mentioned in ancient Hindu scriptures, including the epic Mahabharata and the Bhagavata Purana. A princess of the Vrishni clan and the daughter of Vasudeva, Subhadra married the Pandava prince Arjuna and became the mother of Abhimanyu.

Subhadra is part of the triad of deities worshipped at the Jagannath Temple at Puri, along with Krishna (as Jagannatha) and Balarama (or Balabhadra). One of the chariots in the annual Ratha Yatra is dedicated to her.

== Etymology and other names ==
The Sanskrit name Subhadrā is made up of two words: su and bhadrā. The prefix su denotes goodness, while bhadrā is translated as fortune or excellence. The name means 'glorious', 'fortunate', 'splendid', or 'auspicious'.

Subhadra is referred to as Bhadrā (भद्रा), literally 'fortunate', when she is introduced to Arjuna in the Mahabharata. According to the appendix of the Mahabharata, the Harivamsa, her birth name was Citrā (चित्रा) which means 'bright, clear, excellent, or colourful'.

== Legends ==
=== Birth ===
According to the epic Mahabharata, Subhadra was born to Yadava chief Vasudeva and his wife Rohini, making her the sister of Balarama and half sister of Krishna. She was the favourite daughter of Vasudeva. In a later alternate account found in the Bhagavata Purana, Subhadra's mother is mentioned to be Devaki—another wife Vasudeva and the mother of Krishna, making her direct sibling of Krishna.

=== Marriage to Arjuna ===
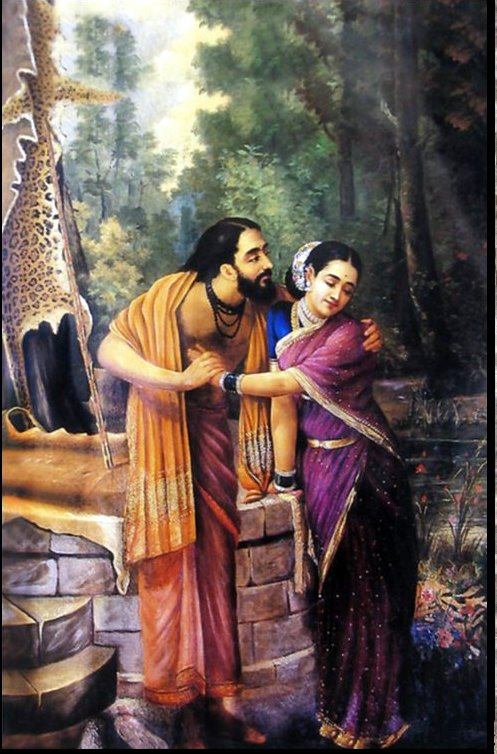
A painting by Raja Ravi Varma depicting Arjuna, dressed as an ascetic, courting Subhadra

Subhadra's marriage with Arjuna is first narrated in the section Subhadraharana Parva of Adi Parva, the first book of the Mahabharata. Different recension of the epic contain varying accounts of the story, with later derivative texts adding more details to it.

According to the Chaturdhara Recension of the Mahabharata, Arjuna was in the midst of self-imposed pilgrimage, for breaking terms of the agreement he had with his brothers regarding private time with their common wife Draupadi. After he reached the city of Dvaraka and met his maternal cousin Krishna, he attended a festival held at Raivata mountain. There Arjuna saw Subhadra and was smitten by her beauty and wished to marry her. Krishna revealed that she was Vasudeva's and Rohini's child, and his half-sister. Krishna stated that he could not predict Subhadra's decision at her svayamvara (groom selection ceremony). After receiving agreement to a letter sent to Yudhishthira for permission, Arjuna drove a chariot to the hills and took Subhadra with him. After Subhadra's guards unsuccessfully attempted to stop them, the Yadavas, the Vrishnis, and the Andhakas held a meeting to discuss the matter. After Krishna comforted them, they agreed, and thus, Arjuna married Subhadra with Vedic rituals. A similar story is included in the Critical Edition of the Mahabharata, compiled by Bhandarkar Oriental Research Institute.

The Kumbhakonam Edition (Southern Recension) of the Mahabharata presents a distinct account of Subhadra's abduction, deviating from the Chaturdhara version. This rendition transforms the narrative into a mutual love story, providing additional details about the events. According to this version, during his pilgrimage, Arjuna reached Prabhasa, where he encountered Gada, a Yadava chief. Gada told Arjuna about Subhadra, kindling Arjuna's desire to marry her. In pursuit of this goal, Arjuna adopted the guise of an ascetic, contemplating under a tree with the hope that Krishna would facilitate his marriage. Simultaneously, in Dvaraka, Krishna, using his divine abilities, became aware of Arjuna's aspiration and visited him at Prabhasa. Krishna guided Arjuna to the Raivataka mountain, the site of an impending festival for the prominent Yadavas. During the festivities, Arjuna, accompanied by Krishna, chanced upon Subhadra and was captivated by her allure. Krishna suggested the abduction of Subhadra, to which Arjuna agreed and decided to wait for a suitable moment. Post-festival, Balarama encountered the disguised Arjuna and extended him an invitation to reside in the Dvaraka palace, as a sign of hospitality. Subhadra assumed the caretaker role for the ascetic, while Arjuna, deeply enamored, openly admired her. Subhadra, upon observing him, recognised his resemblance to Arjuna, from him having been previously described by Gada and Krishna. Acknowledging Subhadra's reciprocation of affection, Arjuna disclosed his true identity. A grand ritual dedicated to the god Shiva was scheduled on an island near Dvaraka, prompting the Yadavas, led by Balarama, to depart for worship. Seizing the opportune moment, Arjuna eloped with Subhadra.

The Bhagavata Purana describes Subhadra's role in choosing Arjuna. It also adds a detail about Balarama having picked Duryodhana—one of the Kauravas—as Subhadra's groom, without her consent. Knowing that after getting the news of Subhadra's having eloped, Balarama would wage a war against Arjuna, Krishna decided to be the charioteer for Arjuna. Arjuna proceeded to take Subhadra and with Krishna in tow, they left. After getting the news that Subhadra had eloped with Arjuna, Balarama consents and conducts the marriage of Subhadra with Arjuna in Dvaraka.

=== Marital life ===
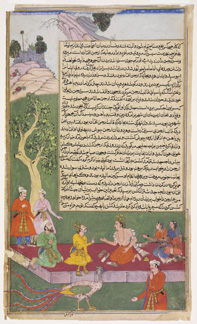
Lord Krishna meets with King Yuddhisthira; and his companions, Queen Kunti and Queen Subhadra, folio from Razmnama (Persian translation of the Mahabharata), dated 1616-1617.

Subhadra's marital life, as depicted in the Mahabharata, reveals her significant role within the Pandava family. According to the Adi Parva, upon Arjuna's return from exile to Indraprastha—the capital of the Pandavas—with Subhadra, he received a warm welcome. Inquiring about his first wife Draupadi, his brothers revealed her reluctance to meet anyone due to anger. Arjuna, in an attempt to reconcile, presented Subhadra to Draupadi disguised as a simple cowherd. Subhadra, portraying herself as a cowherder and Krishna's younger sister, entrusted Draupadi with her belongings, expressing herself as her maid. This gesture cultivated trust and affection, prompting Subhadra to humbly declare her reluctance to replace Draupadi. Touched by this display of love, Draupadi embraced Subhadra, embracing her as a younger sister and acknowledging her as Arjuna's wife.

Subhadra stayed with Arjuna in Indraprastha where she gave birth to Abhimanyu. During the Pandavas' exile for thirteen years, Subhadra and her son resided with Krishna in Dvaraka, as documented in the Vana Parva. She later attended Abhimanyu's wedding in Upaplavya, as described in the Virata Parva. The death of Abhimanyu in the Kurukshetra War caused her significant grief, evidenced by her lamentation to Krishna in the Drona Parva. Following the end of Kurukshetra War, Subhadra returned to Dvaraka with Krishna, according to the Ashvamedha Parva. The same text also records her emotional distress, including instances of syncope, due to her son's death. Subhadra's role became crucial during the birth of Parikshit, Abhimanyu's posthumous son, when the Kuru lineage faced potential extinction due to the risk of a stillborn child. As Uttara underwent labour, and the royal women of the Kuru dynasty gathered, Subhadra, Parikshit's grandmother, reminded Krishna of his prior vow to restore the child. She invoked his virtues of dharma, satya, and satyavikrama, urging him to uphold his promise in accordance with ṛta, the cosmic order. This appeal prompted Krishna to perform a miraculous act, thereby ensuring the survival of the Kuru lineage.

Subhadra subsequently travelled to Hastinapura to attend Yudhisthira's Ashvamedha Yajna, as stated in the Ashvamedhika Parva, where she met her co-wives Ulupi and Chitrangada. The Mahaprasthanika Parva describes her later life as marked by sorrowful silence. After Parikshit was seated on the throne, while leaving for heaven, Yudhishthira gave the responsibility of keeping both the kingdoms Hastinapura ruled by her grandson and Indraprastha being ruled by Vajranabha, the great-grandson of her brother Krishna in harmony. There is no specific mention in the epic about how and when she died but it is believed that after the Pandavas along with Draupadi reached heaven, Subhadra and her daughter-in-law (Uttarā) went to the forest to dwell the rest of their lives as hermits.

== As a goddess ==
=== Association with Ekanamsha or Yogamaya ===
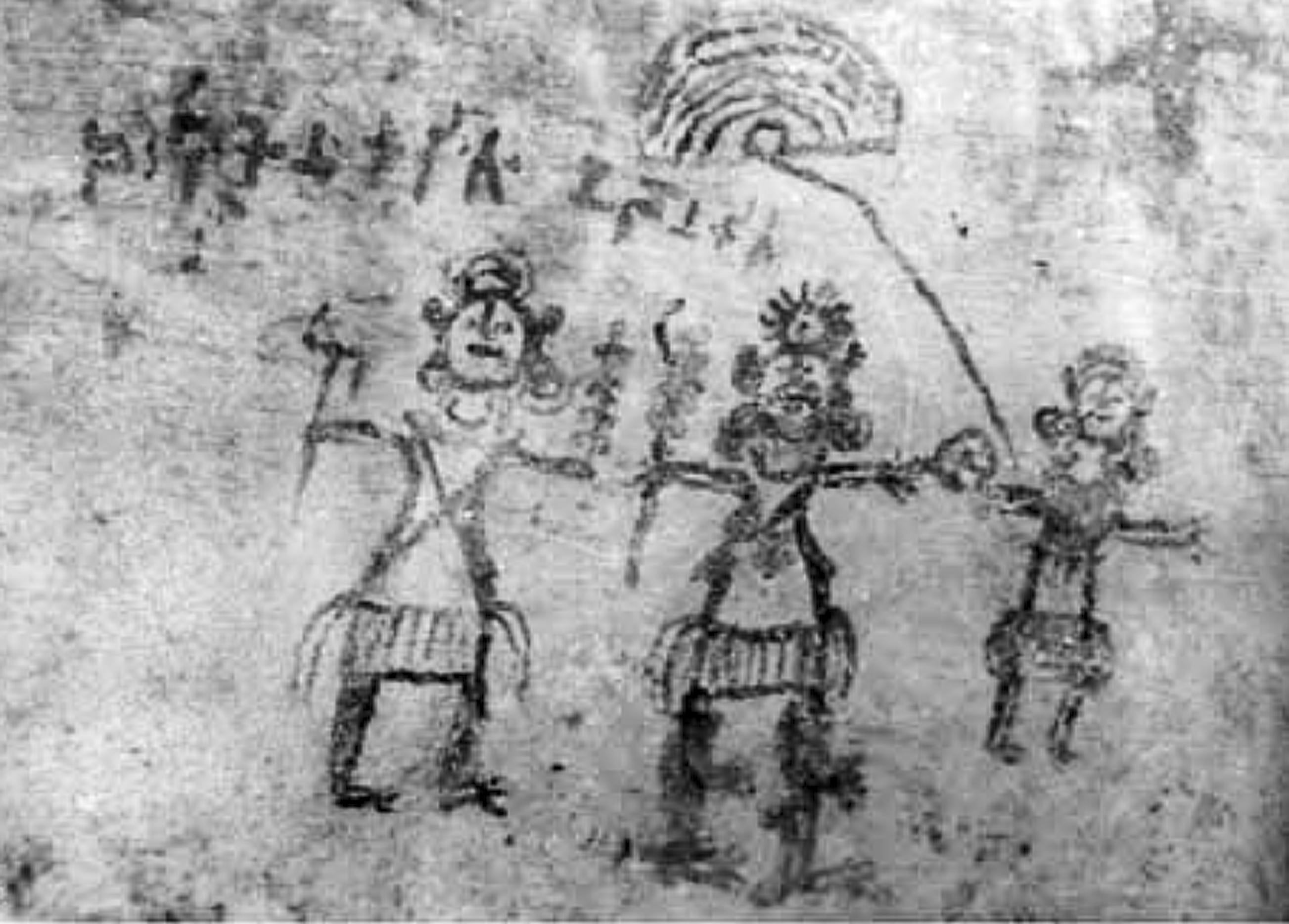
Balarama, Vāsudeva and the goddess Ekanamsha shown in a rock painting at Tikla, 3rd-2nd century BCE.

Subhadra is associated with goddess Ekanamsha or Yogamaya, both forms of primordial goddess Mahadevi. Kushana images from 2nd-century CE Mathura depict a triad of deities: two gods flanking a goddess. Comparable 9th-century representations in Etah and Ellora mirror this composition. This is identified as the Vrishni triad, featuring Samkarshana (Balarama), Ekanamsha, and Vāsudeva (Krishna). Here, Ekanamsha is an ancient goddess worshipped by the Vrishni people and is identified with Subhadra; later this triad becomes popular in Jagannath sect.

In Krishna's life, Yogamaya plays the role of the facilitator of his earthly birth and his guardian. She takes birth as the daughter of cowherd Nandagopa and Yashoda, after which her place is swapped with Krishna to protect the latter from the tyrant ruler Kamsa. After warning Kamsa about his impending death, Yogamaya vanishes. According to Devdutt Pattanaik, the scriptures don't clarify if Yogamaya becomes Subhadra after fulfilling her role, but the name 'Yogamaya' is synonymous with Subhadra in Puri, Odisha, where she is worshipped prominently. Professor Lavanya Vemsani believes that the only way to understand Subhadra's connection with the goddesses is by considering her as reincarnation of Ekanamsha, who in turn is the Earthly manifestation of Yogamaya. According to her, Yogamaya descends on Earth as Ekanamsha— the daughter of Nanda and Yashoda—and later reincarnates as Subhadra.

=== Worship ===
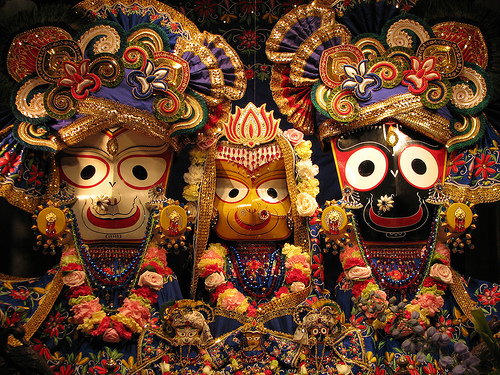
Subhadra in the middle with her brothers Balabhadra (Balarama) and Jagannath (Krishna)

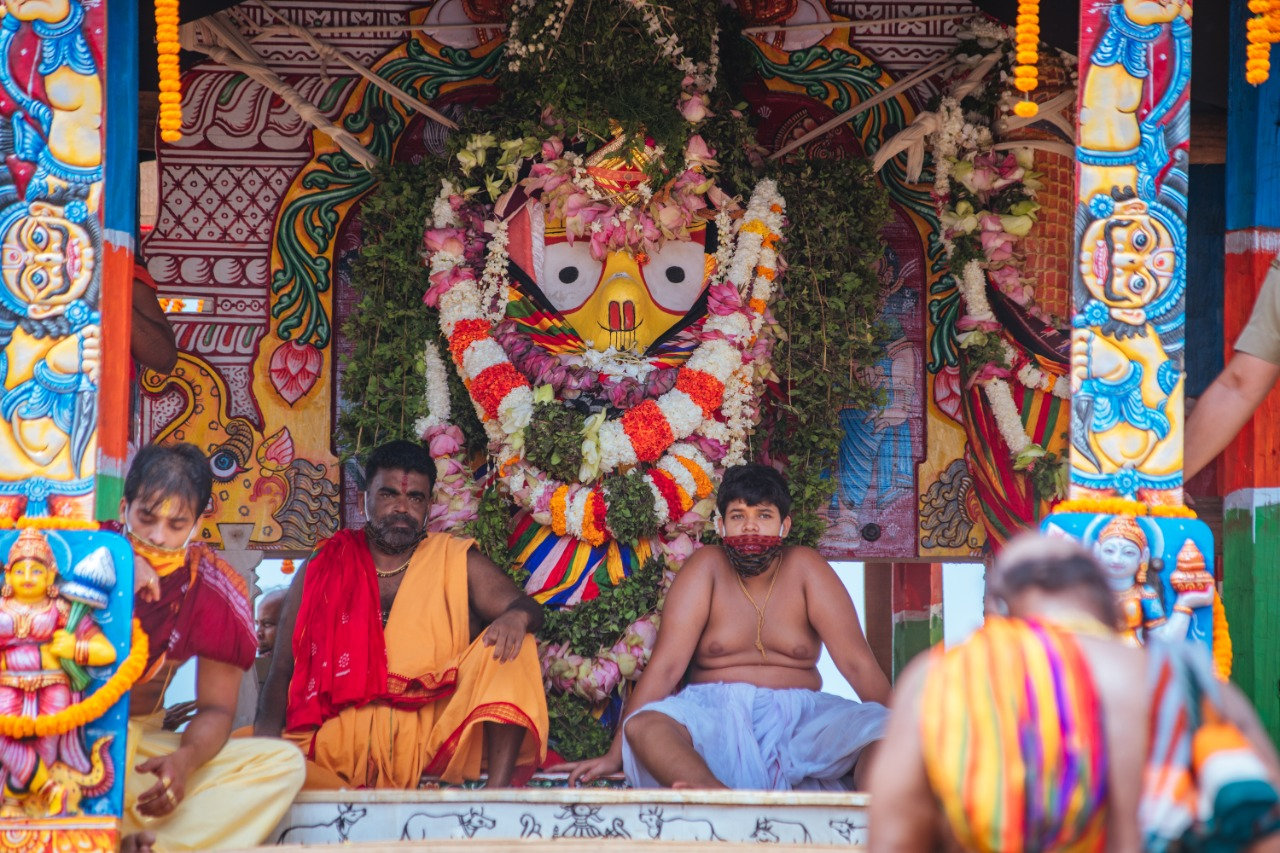
Subhadra (in Jagannath Temple, Puri)

Subhadra is one of the three deities worshipped at the Jagannath temple at Puri, along with Krishna (as Jagannatha) and Balarama (or Balabhadra). The idol of Subhadra is a carved and decorated wooden stump with large round eyes and a symmetric yellow coloured face, contrasting Jagannath's black complexion and Balabhadra's white complexion. She is decorated with red and black garments and has iconographical elements similar to that of the goddess Bhuvaneshvari, which includes a lasso (pasha) and an elephant goad (ankusha) for both of them. One of the three chariots in the annual Ratha Yatra is dedicated to her and is called Dvarpadalana, symbolising destruction of evil. Apart from it, she is also believed to be worshipped by certain communities in Odisha, West Bengal, Gujarat and Bangladesh.

There is a village called Bhadrajun in the western part of Rajasthan where Subhadra is worshipped as Dhumda Mata since the time of Mahabharata. It is believed that, after eloping with her lover Arjuna and a gruelling journey of three days, the couple got married here.

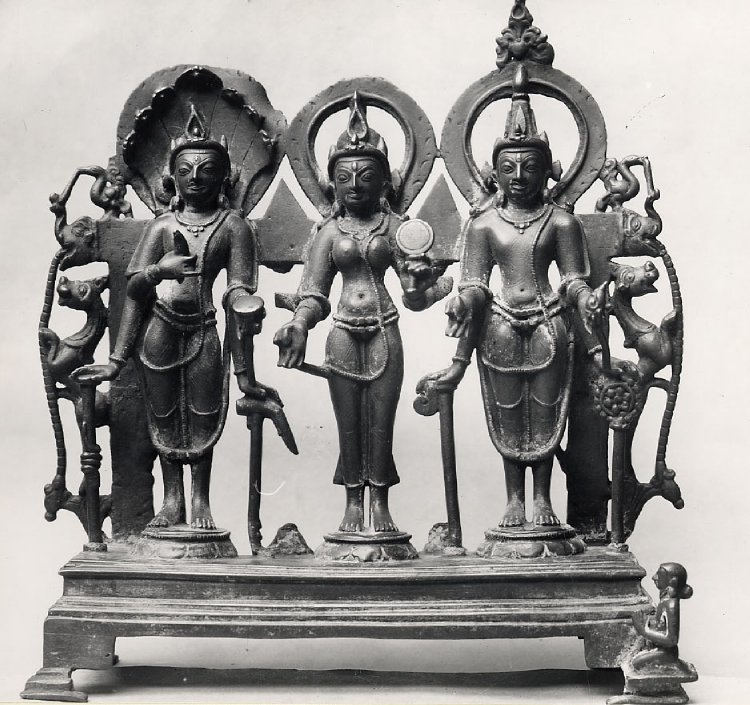
Balarama (Samkarshana, Shesha), Subhadra (Yogamaya, Vindhyavashini), Krishna (Vasudeva, Krishna) idols in the early 11th century CE

In some texts like the Brahma Purana and the Garga Samhita, Subhadra is mentioned as Shatarupa with Arjuna being Swayambhuva Manu. She is also worshipped as Bhuvaneshvari in some sects. Apart from it, Subhadra is sometimes linked with Lakshmi in some Vaishnav traditions.

== See also ==
- Rukmini
