= List of largest peaceful gatherings =

This is a list of the largest historic peaceful gatherings of people in the world at one place for a single event. Note that some of these numbers are only rough estimates, and that different gatherings have different methods of counting those present.

== Over 100 million ==
Event	Continuous Multi-Day Participation	Single Day		Type	Location	Country	Ref.
Event	Continuous Multi-Day Participation	Date	Single Day Participants	Type	Location	Country	Ref.
2025 Prayag Maha Kumbh Mela	670 million	29 January 2025	76 million	Pilgrimage	Prayagraj	India	
2019 Prayag Ardh Kumbh Mela	240 million	4 February 2019	50 million	Pilgrimage	Prayagraj	India	
2013 Prayag Kumbh Mela	120 million	10 February 2013	30 million	Pilgrimage	Prayagraj	India	

== 10 to 100 million ==
Event	Continuous Multi-Day Participation	Single Day		Type	Location	Country	Notes	Ref.
Event	Continuous Multi-Day Participation	Date	Single Day Participants	Type	Location	Country	Notes	Ref.
2010 Haridwar Kumbh Mela	70 million	14 April 2010	10 million	Pilgrimage	Haridwar	India		
Durga Puja in Kolkata	30 million	September–October (9–13 October, 2024)		Annual Hindu Festival & Public Art Festival	Kolkata	India	10-day religious, cultural and public art festival.	
Arba'een Pilgrimage	30 million	2017		Pilgrimage	Karbala	Iraq		
Arba'een Pilgrimage	27 million	2015		Pilgrimage	Karbala	Iraq		
Arba'een Pilgrimage	22 million	2023		Pilgrimage	Karbala	Iraq		
Arba'een Pilgrimage	21.2 million	2022		Pilgrimage	Karbala	Iraq		
Arba'een Pilgrimage	21 million	17 Sep 2022		Pilgrimage	Karbala	Iraq		
Arba'een Pilgrimage	20 million	2014		Pilgrimage	Karbala	Iraq		
2001 Prayag Kumbh Mela	20 million	30 January 2001		Pilgrimage	Prayagraj	India		
Arba'een Pilgrimage	16.3 million	September 2021		Pilgrimage	Karbala	Iraq		
Arba'een Pilgrimage	15.3 million	October 2018		Pilgrimage	Karbala	Iraq		
Arba'een Pilgrimage	15.2 million	October 2019		Pilgrimage	Karbala	Iraq		
Arba'een Pilgrimage	15–18 million	January 2013		Pilgrimage	Karbala	Iraq		
Arba'een Pilgrimage	15 million	January 2012		Pilgrimage	Karbala	Iraq		
Arba'een Pilgrimage	15 million	January 2011		Pilgrimage	Karbala	Iraq		
Funeral of C. N. Annadurai	15 million	4 February 1969	15 million	Funeral	Marina Beach, Chennai	India		
Arba'een Pilgrimage	14.6 million	October 2020		Pilgrimage	Karbala	Iraq		
Arba'een Pilgrimage	14 million	2017		Pilgrimage	Karbala	Iraq		
Martyrdom processions of Musa al-Kazim	12 million	2016		Muslim Martyrdom processions	Kadhimiya, Baghdad	Iraq		
Martyrdom processions of Musa al-Kazim	12 million	2015		Martyrdom processions	Kadhimiya, Baghdad	Iraq		
Arba'een Pilgrimage	11.2 million	November 2016		Pilgrimage	Karbala	Iraq		
Funeral of Ruhollah Khomeini	10.2 million	6 June 1989		Funeral	Tehran	Iran		
Arba'een Pilgrimage	10–14 million	2009		Pilgrimage	Karbala	Iraq		
Arba'een Pilgrimage	10 million	January 2010		Pilgrimage	Karbala	Iraq		
Vindhyachal Temple fair	10 million	February 2025		Hindu pilgrimage	Vindhyachal	India		

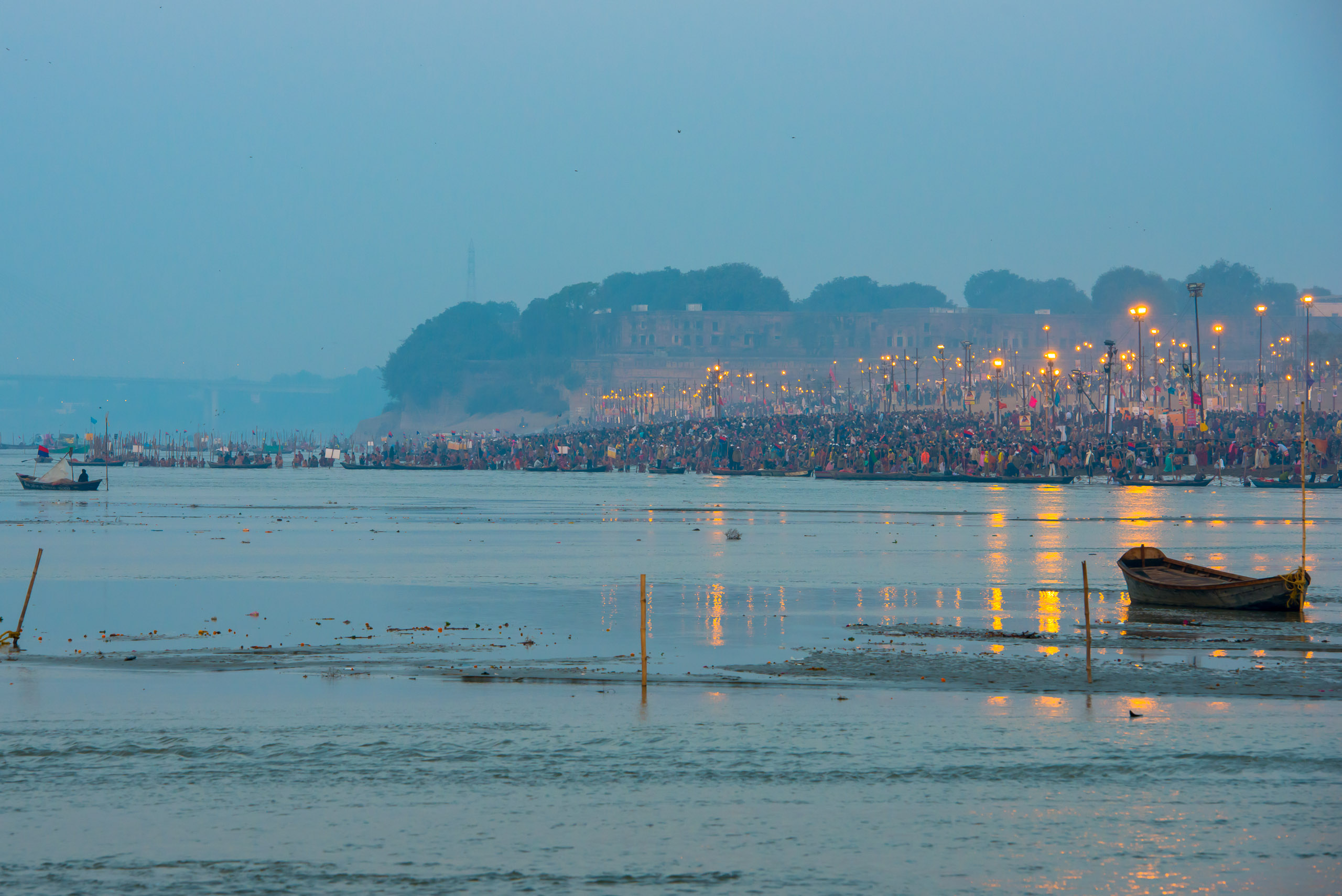
Approximately 50 and 30 million people attended the Prayagraj Ardh Kumbh Mela in 2019 and Maha Maha Kumbh Mela in 2013, respectively to bathe in the Ganges, making them the largest peaceful gathering events in the world.

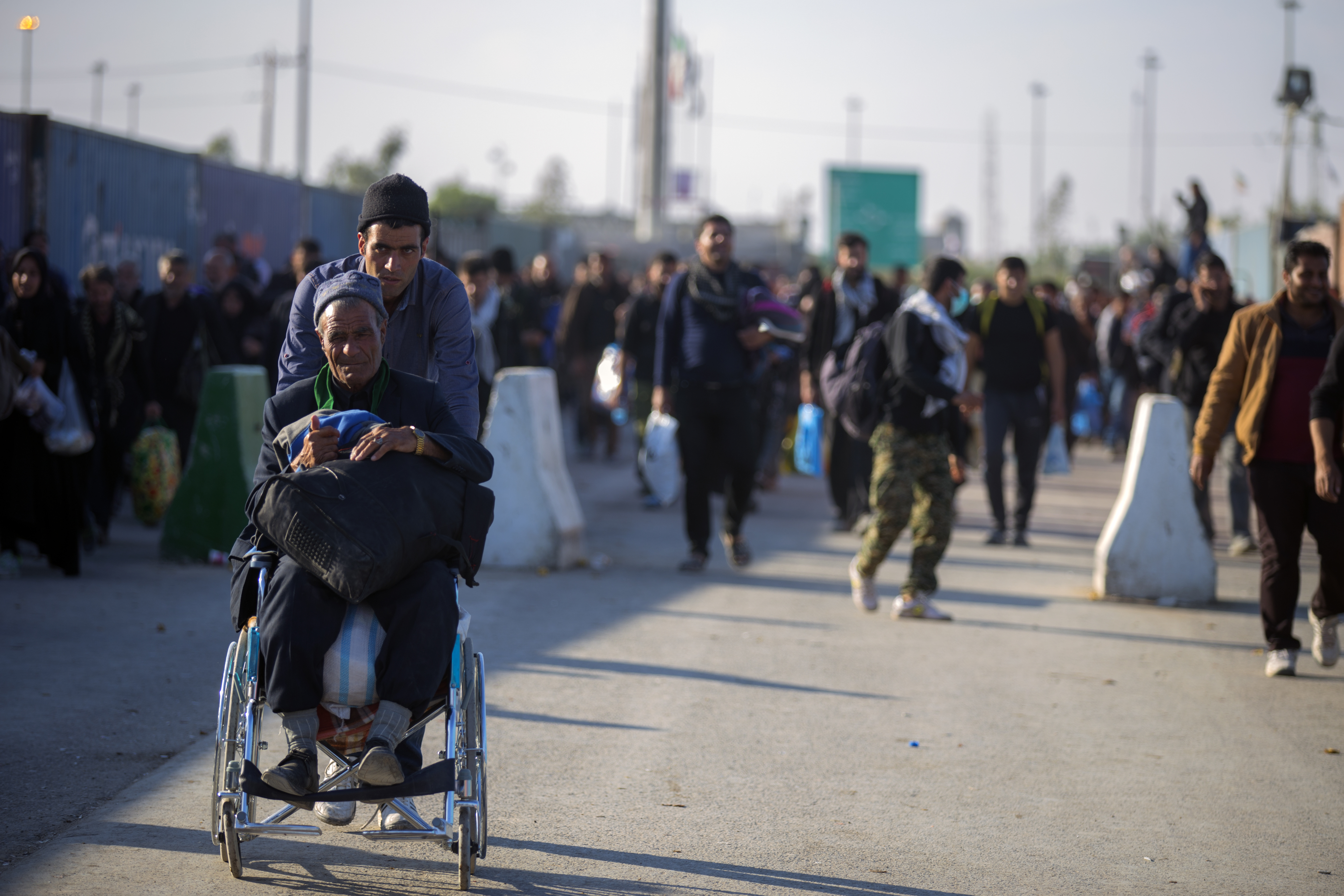
People taking part in the Arba'een Pilgrimage

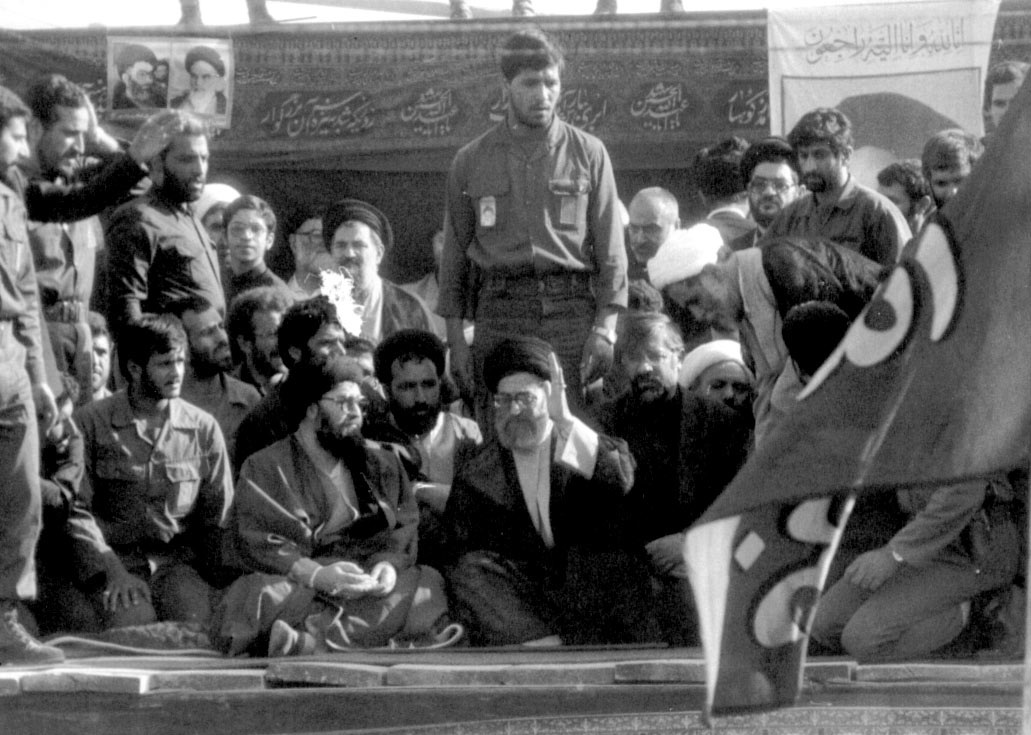
Attendees at the funeral of Ruhollah Khomeini

== 5 to 10 million ==
Event	Date	Participants	Type	Location	Country	Notes	Ref.
Feast of the Black Nazarene	9 January 2026	Over 9.6 million	Religious holiday	Manila	Philippines	Longest traslación (procession) in the feast’s history, lasting 30 hours, 50 minutes	
Feast of the Black Nazarene	9 January 2025	Over 8.1 million	Religious holiday	Manila	Philippines		
Celebration of General Douglas MacArthur after he was relieved of duty by President Harry S. Truman	20 April 1951	7.5 million	Celebration	New York City	USA		
Martyrdom anniversary of Imam Hussein	October 2015	7–9 million	Martyrdom anniversary	Karbala	Iraq		
Mass on the Feast of Santo Niño at the apostolic and state visit of Pope Francis in the Philippines	18 January 2015	6–7 million	Religious gathering	Rizal Park, Manila	Philippines	Largest papal crowd in history	
Feast of the Black Nazarene	9 January 2024	Over 6 million	Religious holiday	Manila	Philippines		
Mid-Sha'ban celebration	6 July 2012	Over 6 million	Religious holiday	Karbala	Iraq		
Feast of the Black Nazarene	9 January 2015	Over 5.5 million	Religious holiday	Manila	Philippines	Ahead of Pope Francis' visit	
Santo Niño de Cebú	18 January 2026	Over 5.2 million	Religious holiday	Cebu City	Philippines		
Mid-Sha'ban pilgrimage to the Shrine of Imam Hussein	20 July 2011	Over 5 million	Pilgrimage	Karbala	Iraq		
Appearance of Pope John Paul II at World Youth Day 1995	January 1995	Over 5 million	Religious gathering	Manila	Philippines	Largest papal crowd in history until visit of Pope Francis to Manila on 18 January 2015	
Parade celebrating Argentina national football team's victory at the 2022 FIFA World Cup	December 2022	Over 5 million	Sports rally	Buenos Aires	Argentina		

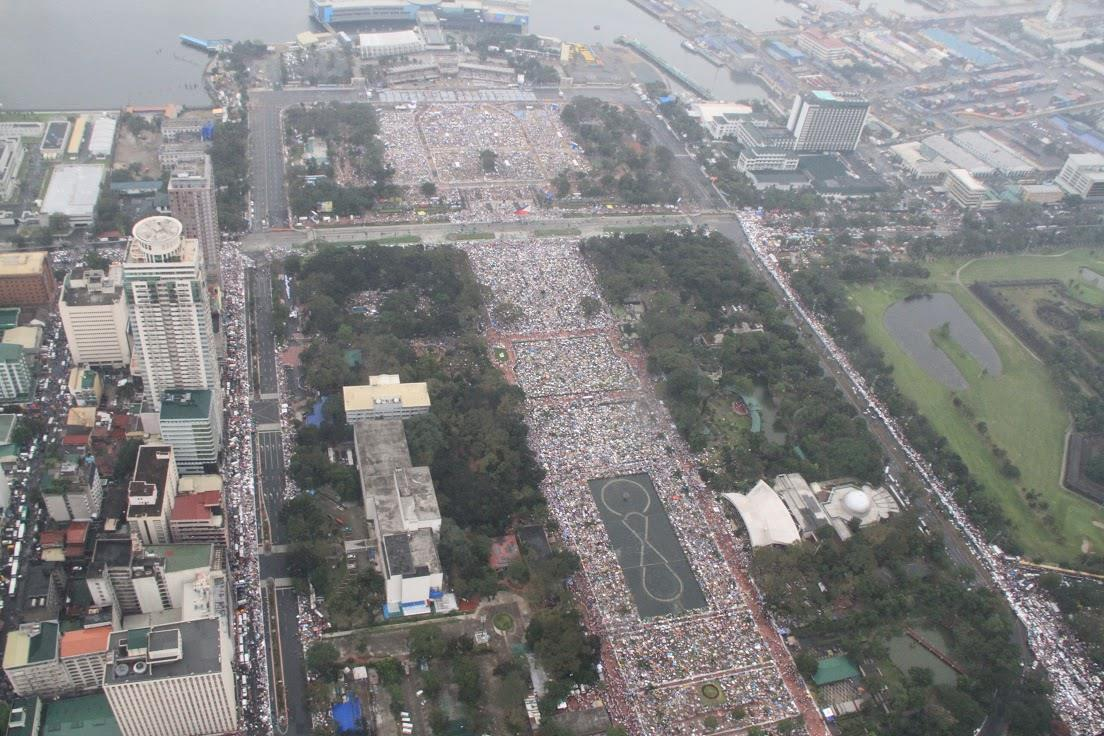
Mass on the Feast of Santo Niño at the apostolic and state visit of Pope Francis in the Philippines with over six million people gathered in Rizal Park, Manila on 18 January 2015.

== 2 to 5 million ==
Event	Date	Participants	Type	Location	Country	Notes	Ref.
Democracy and Martyrs' Rally	7 August 2016	5 million	Political rally	Istanbul	Turkey	5 million according to Istanbul Police Department	
Chicago Cubs 2016 World Series parade	4 November 2016	5 million	Sports rally	Chicago	USA	The Cubs' victory marked their first World Series win since 1908. 5 million people attended according to the Chicago Office of Emergency Management and Communications.	
Death anniversary of Imam Kazim	30 June 2011	5 million	Pilgrimage	Al-Kadhimiya Mosque, Kadhimiyah	Iraq		
Funeral of Gamal Abdel Nasser	1 October 1970	5 million	Funeral	Cairo	Egypt		
Bishwa Ijtema	2010	5 million	Religious holiday	Dhaka	Bangladesh		
Makara Jyothi	14 January 2007	5 million	Religious holiday	Sabarimala Temple, Sabarimala	India		
Rod Stewart concert	31 December 1994	4.2 million	Music performance	Rio de Janeiro	Brazil		
Ashura	2010	Over 4 million	Religious holiday	Karbala	Iraq		
Funeral of Umm Kulthum	6 February 1975	4 million	Funeral	Cairo	Egypt		
WorldPride	30 June 2019	4 million	Celebration	New York City	USA		
Pledge of allegiance to Imam Ali	16 November 2011	Over 3 million	Political rally	Najaf	Iraq		
CGIL labour reform protest	23 March 2002	Over 3 million	Political rally	Circus Maximus, Rome	Italy	Against Silvio Berlusconi's conservative government's labour reform	
Nabakalebara Ratha Yatra	2015	Over 3 million	Religious holiday	Puri	India		
Jean-Michel Jarre concert	1997	3.5 million	Music performance	Moscow	Russia	Celebration of the 850th birthday of Moscow	
Santo Niño de Cebú	19 January 2014	3.2 million	Religious gathering	Cebu City	Philippines		
Hajj to Mecca	2012	3.16 million	Pilgrimage	Mecca	Saudi Arabia		
Pastoral visit of Pope Leo XIV to Peru	November 2026	3 million	Religious gathering	Lima	Peru		
Narmada Circumbulation	March–April 2025	3 million	Hindu Festival	Narmada River	India	3 million at least	
Funeral of Ayrton Senna	5 May 1994	3 million	Funeral	São Paulo	Brazil	100 million more television viewers	
Death anniversary of Muhammad and Imam Hassan	3 February 2011	3 million	Religious gathering	Najaf	Iraq		
Ramadan iftar	13 July 2013	3 million	Religious gathering	Imam Reza shrine, Mashhad	Iran	Largest-ever iftar	
Anti-war rally against the U.S.-led invasion of Iraq	15 February 2003	3 million	Political rally	Rome	Italy		
Benazir Bhutto's return from exile	1986	3 million	Celebration	Lahore	Pakistan	The procession covered the 12 kilometres (7.5 mi) distance from the Lahore Airport to Minar-e-Pakistan in over ten hours.	
Closing Mass of World Youth Day 2013		3 million	Religious gathering	Copacabana Beach, Rio de Janeiro	Brazil		
Coronation of Queen Elizabeth II	2 June 1953	3 million	Celebration	London	UK		
Boston Red Sox's 2004 World Series win	30 October 2004	3 million	Sports rally	Boston	USA	The victory ended an 86-year drought of World Series championships and ended the era of the famous Curse of the Bambino.	
Closing Mass of World Youth Day 2016	2016	Up to 3 million	Religious gathering	Kraków	Poland		
New Year's Eve Party	31 December	Over 2 million	Celebration	Copacabana Beach, Rio de Janeiro	Brazil	World's largest New Year's Eve party	
Hajj to Mecca	2016	Over 2 million	Pilgrimage	Mount Arafat, Mecca	Saudi Arabia		
2019–20 Hong Kong protests	18 August 2019	Over 2 million	Political rally	Hong Kong Island	China	Following the indefinite suspension of the extradition bill, protestors asked the Hong Kong government to accede to five demands. Protestors also protested against the violence of the city's police force and perceived collusion with the Chinese triads. The organiser claimed a total number of attendees of over 1.7 million (only counting people in the Causeway Bay and Tin Hau areas) while people also gathered around Wan Chai, Central and Sheung Wan. An estimated number of over 2 million people took part in the march.	
New York Knicks 2026 Championship parade	18 June 2026	Over 2 million	Sports rally	New York City	United States	New York's championship victory in 2026 was the third title in franchise history and first since 1973	
International Kolkata Book Fair 2025	28 January – 9 February, 2025	2.9 million	Book Fair	Kolkata	India	International Kolkata Book Fair is the world's largest non-trade book fair, Asia's largest book fair (by publishers) and the most attended book fair in the world. It is the world's third-largest annual conglomeration of books after the Frankfurt Book Fair and the London Book Fair.	
Hajj to Mecca	November 2010	2.8 million	Pilgrimage	Mecca	Saudi Arabia	Number excludes unregistered pilgrims, which were over 0.75 million.	
Feast of the Black Nazarene	January 2008	2.6 million	Religious holiday	Manila	Philippines		
Pastoral visit of Pope Leo XIV to Argentina	November 2026	2.5 million	Religious gathering	Buenos Aires	Argentina		
Lady Gaga's Mayhem on the Beach concert in Rio de Janeiro	3 May 2025	2.5 million	Concert	Copacabana Beach, Rio de Janeiro	Brazil		
Funeral of Puneeth Rajkumar	29 October 2021	2.5 million	Funeral	Bangalore	India		
Funeral of Akbar Hashemi Rafsanjani	10 January 2017	2.5 – 4.5 million	Funeral	Tehran	Iran		
Art of Living Silver Jubilee Celebration	2016	2.5 million	Celebration	Bangalore	India		
Pastoral visit of Pope John Paul II to Poland	June 2-10, 1979	2.5 million	Religious gathering	Błonia Park, Kraków	Poland		
São Paulo Gay Pride Parade	June 2006	2.5 million	Celebration	São Paulo	Brazil		
Funeral of Mahatma Gandhi	31 January 1948	2.5 million	Funeral	New Delhi	India		
Funeral of Pope John Paul II	8 April 2005	2 - 4 million	Funeral	Vatican	Vatican		
Chicago Blackhawks 2013 Stanley Cup parade	2013	2 million	Sports rally	Chicago	USA		
Philadelphia Flyers 1974 Stanley Cup parade	1974	2 million	Sports rally	Philadelphia	USA		
Philadelphia Phillies 2008 World Series parade	31 October 2008	2 million	Sports rally	Broad Street, Philadelphia	USA		
Funeral of Ziaur Rahman	2 June 1981	2 million	Funeral		Bangladesh		
Spain national football team 2010 FIFA World Cup parade	2010	2 million	Sports rally	Madrid	Spain		
Attukal Pongala	4 March 2007	2 million	Religious holiday	Attukal Temple, Attukal	India	Largest gathering of women in history, overtaking the record set by the same festival on 23 February 1997	
Baltic Way demonstration	23 August 1989	2 million	Political rally	Between Vilnius, Riga and Tallinn	Lithuania, Latvia, Estonia	The demonstrators formed an uninterrupted 675 kilometres (419 mi) human chain.	
Bicentennial of the May Revolution	25 May 2010	2 million	Celebration	9 de Julio avenue, Buenos Aires	Argentina		
Funeral of Bal Thackeray	18 November 2012	2 million	Funeral	Mumbai	India	7 kilometres (4.3 mi)-long cortège	
Bishwa Ijtema	2001	2 million	Religious holiday	Dhaka	Bangladesh		
People Power Revolution	February 1986	2 million	Political rally	Manila	Philippines	Resulted in the downfall of President Ferdinand Marcos	
Funeral of Benigno Aquino Jr.	31 August 1983	2 million	Funeral		Philippines		
Funeral of Corazon Aquino	5 August 2009	2 million	Funeral		Philippines		
World Youth Day	August 2000	2 million	Religious gathering	Rome	Italy		
Ashura	24 December 2013	2 million	Religious gathering	Raja Bazaar, Rawalpindi	Pakistan	Gathering prior to the Ashura riots; commemoration of Chehlum of Imam Hussain. Despite threats from Takfiri groups against the assembled Shia Muslims, the Takfiris eventually were forced to retreat.	
Iglesia ni Cristo's 100th anniversary	27 July 2014	2 million	Celebration	Ciudad de Victoria	Philippines		
Wedding of Charles, Prince of Wales, and Lady Diana Spencer	29 July 1981	2 million	Wedding	London	UK		
Ashura	9 August 2013	2 million	Religious holiday	Hussani Chuk Skardu, Gilgit-Baltistan	Pakistan	Commemoration of Majlis of Imam Hussain	
2019–20 Hong Kong protests	16 June 2019	2 million	Political rally	Hong Kong Island	China	Around 30% of the population protested Hong Kong Chief Executive Carrie Lam delaying a controversial extradition bill, calling on her to completely withdraw the legislation and resign. The crowd also protested against the violence of the city's police force towards the protestors on 12 June 2019.	
December 2016 Jakarta protests	December 2016	2 million	Political rally	Monas, Jakarta	Indonesia	The protests demanded the termination of the gubernatorial office held by Basuki Tjahaja Purnama, who had been accused as a suspect in the blasphemy case.	
Los Angeles Dodgers 2024 World Series parade	November 1, 2024	2 million	Sports rally	Los Angeles	USA	Also included fan tributes to former Dodgers star pitcher Fernando Valenzuela, who passed away a week earlier.	

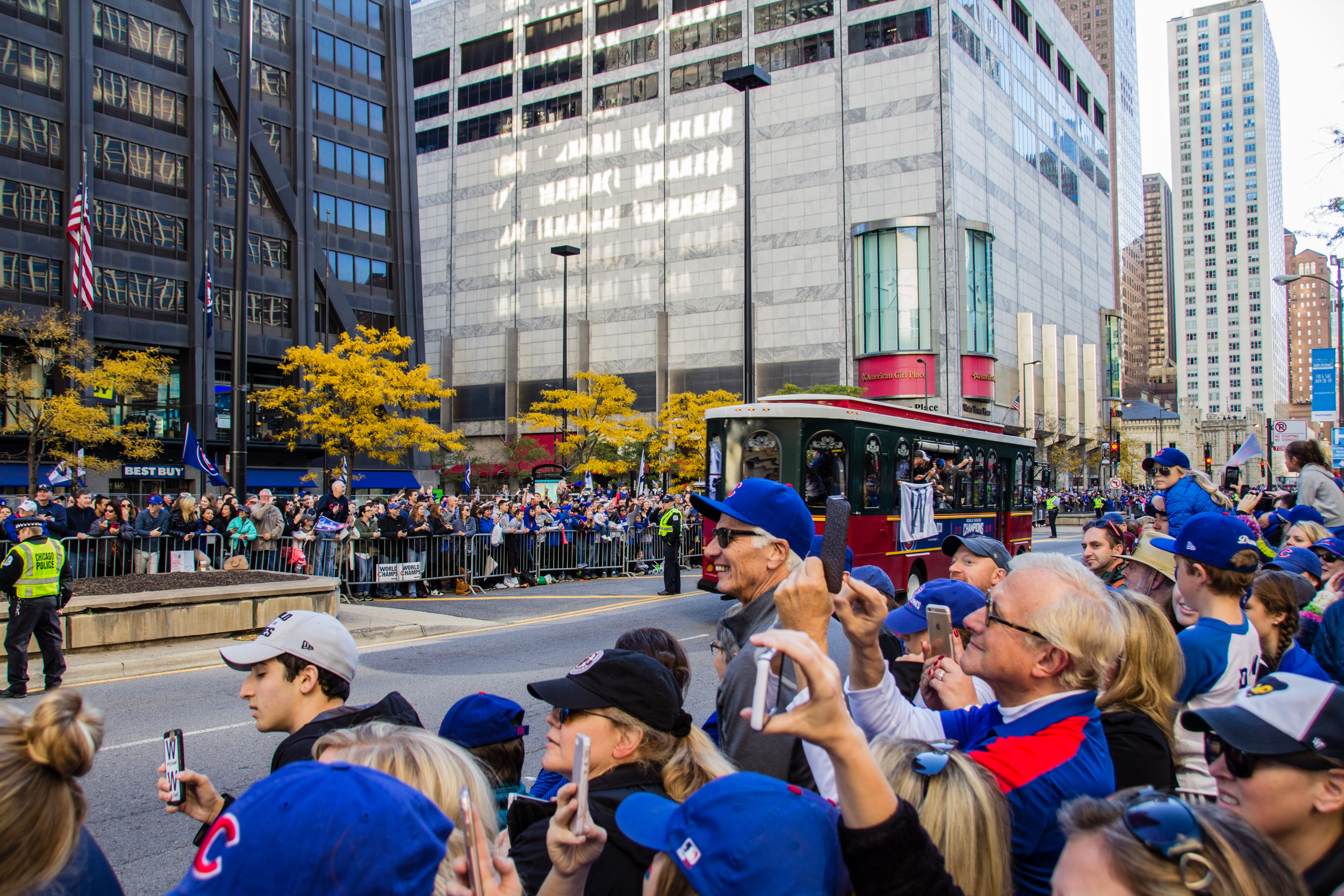
The Chicago Cubs' 2016 World Series victory parade and rally attracted over five million people.

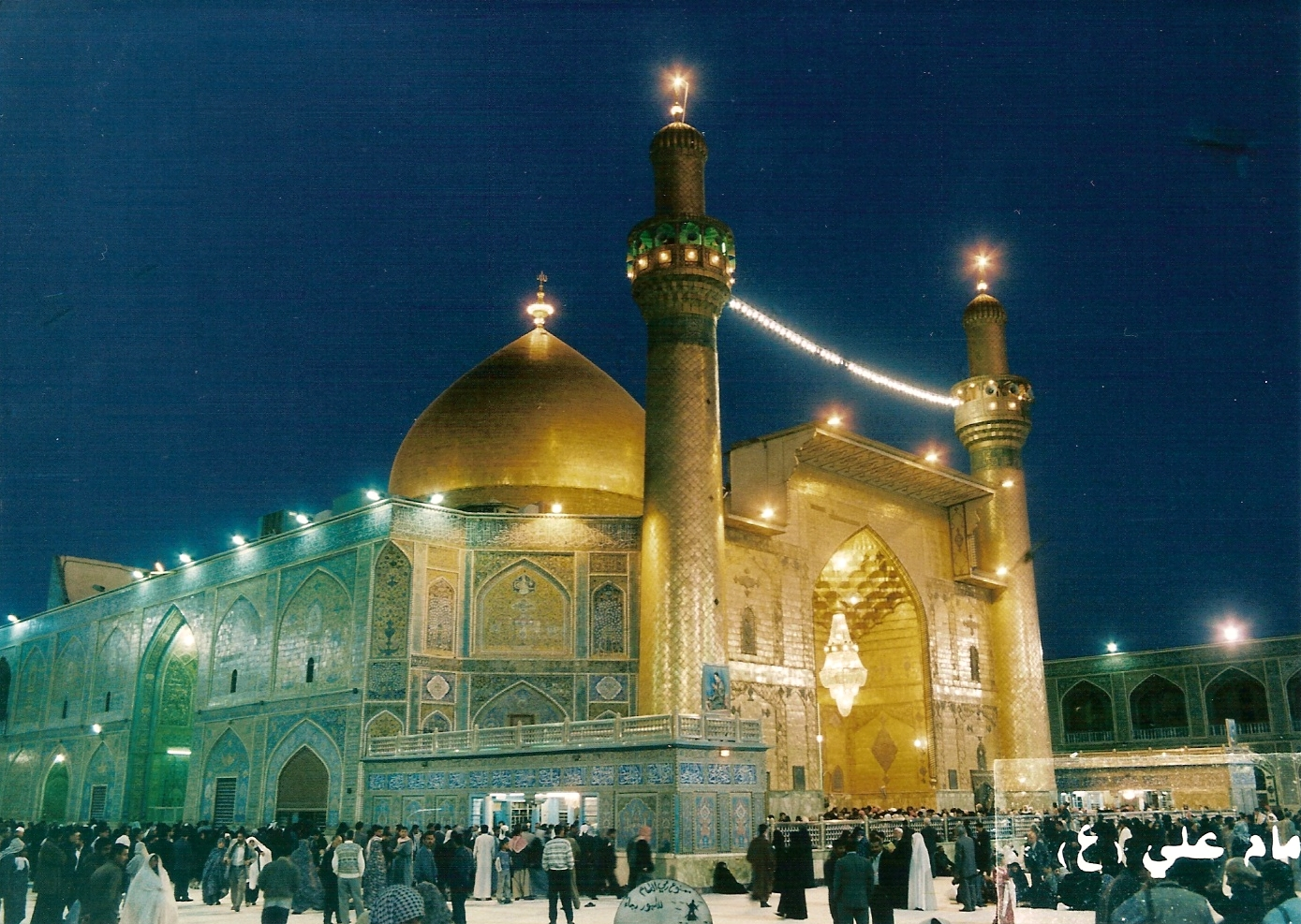
Four million pilgrims visited Imam Ali Shrine in Iraq on the anniversary martyrdom of the first Shia Imam on 28 June 2016.

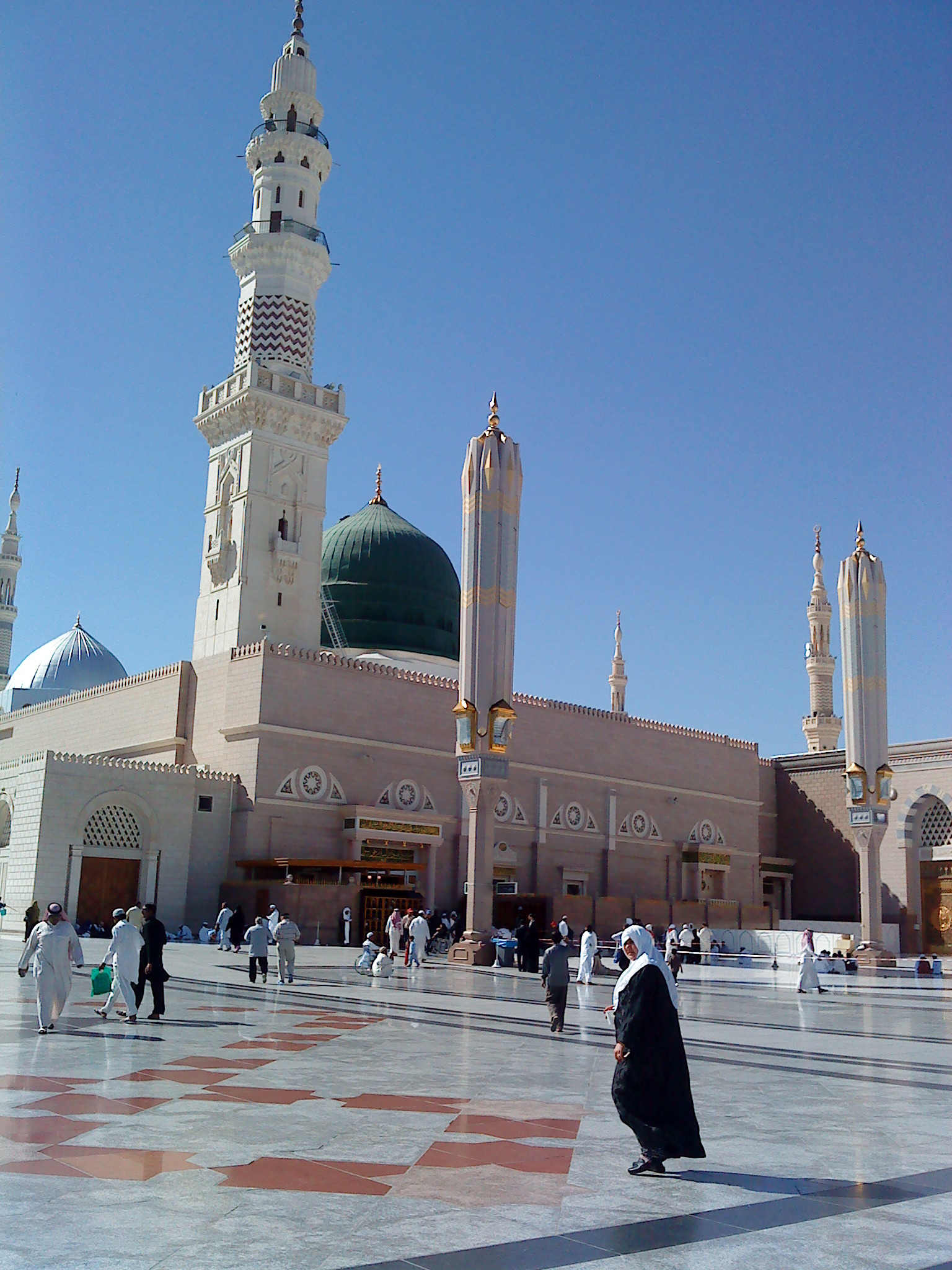
More than two million Muslims gather for the important ritual as part of Hajj 2016.

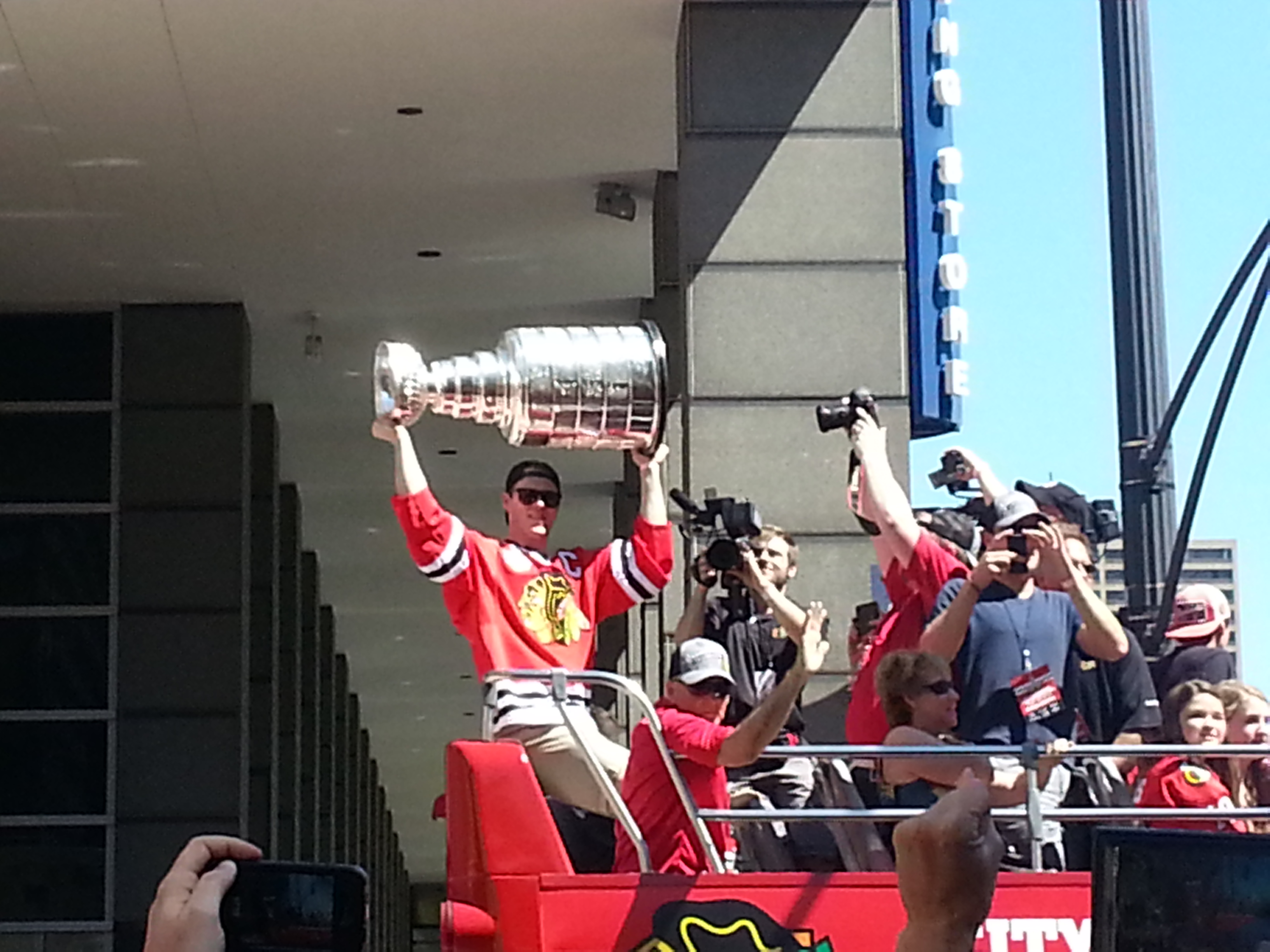
Over two million people attended the parade and rally celebrating the Chicago Blackhawks winning the 2013 Stanley Cup Finals.

== 1 to 2 million ==
Event	Date	Participants	Type	Location	Country	Notes	Ref.
2019 Toronto Raptors championship parade	17 June 2019	1.5 million	Sports rally	Toronto	Canada	The victory marked the Toronto Raptors' first championship in franchise history.	
Surajkunds Annual International Crafts Mela	1–16 February 2020	1.3 million	Craft Festival	Faridabad	India	Annual international crafts festival held in National Capital Region (India).	
Vindhyachal Temple fair	13 days in 2024	1.5 million	Hindu pilgrimage	Vindhyachal	India	Annual religious pilgrimage in Uttar Pradesh.	
Funeral of Ulysses S. Grant	08 August 1885	1.5 million	Funeral	New York City	USA	Grant's pallbearers were Generals William Tecumseh Sherman and Philip Sheridan, who had fought for the Union, and Simon Bolivar Buckner and Joseph E. Johnston, who had fought for the Confederacy. Union and Confederate officers in the procession rode together in the same carriages.	
First inauguration of Barack Obama	20 January 2009	1.8 million	Political rally	Washington, DC	USA		
Rally for Catalan independence	11 September 2014	1.8 million	Political rally	Barcelona	Spain	Protestors drew an 11 kilometres (6.8 mi) V-shaped Catalan flag with their red and yellow T-shirts.	
Madonna's Celebration Tour concert in Rio de Janeiro	4 May 2024	1.6 million	Concert	Copacabana Beach, Rio de Janeiro	Brazil	As closure for her Celebration tour, Madonna organised a free concert in Rio's Copacabana beach, gathering a crowd of 1.6 million.	
Support for the Tiananmen Square protests of 1989	1989	1.5 – 2 million	Political rally	Hong Kong	China	The line of people extended from North Point to Sheung Wan, with all six lanes of King's Road (Hong Kong), Hennessy Road and Des Voeux Road crowded with people. Many underground MTR stations on Hong Kong Island were full of people, and many people who could not participate in the demonstration above ground were stuck in the congested MTR stations. Therefore the exact number of demonstrators could only be estimated.	
IAF Air Show	6 October 2024	1.5 million	Air show	Chennai	India	92nd Indian Air Force Day	
Diretas Já Movement	1984	1.5 million	Political rally	São Paulo	Brazil	Largest political protest in Brazil's history	
San Francisco Pride	2013	1.5 million	Celebration	San Francisco	USA	This occurred in the wake of the Supreme Court decisions on DOMA and Proposition 8.	
Live 8 concert	2 July 2005	1.5 million	Music performance	Philadelphia	USA		
Funeral of Jawaharlal Nehru	1964	1.5 million	Funeral	New Delhi	India		
2012 Catalan independence demonstration	11 September 2012	1.5 million	Political rally	Barcelona	Spain		
World Youth Day 2023	1–6 August 2023	1.5 million	Religious gathering	Lisbon	Portugal		
Funeral of the Duke of Wellington	18 November 1852	1.5 million	Funeral	London	UK	The crowd had travelled from all over the United Kingdom by train and represented more than five percent of the total population	
Arsenal FC 2025-26 Premier League Champions Parade	31 May 2026	1 - 1.5 million	Sports rally	Islington and Hackney, London	UK		
World Youth Day 2011	16–21 August 2011	1.4 million	Religious gathering	Madrid	Spain		
Cleveland Cavaliers 2016 NBA Championship parade	22 June 2016	1.3 million	Sports rally	Cleveland	USA	The victory ended a 52-year Cleveland sports curse.	
Pope John Paul II's papal mass in Ireland	29 September 1979	1.25 million	Religious gathering	Phoenix Park, Dublin	Ireland	The estimated attendance was about one third of the population of Ireland.	
Mother of All Marches	19 April 2017	Over 1.2 million	Political rally	Across the country	Venezuela	The demonstrations resulted from the 2017 Venezuelan constitutional crisis.	
Anti-terrorism rally in the aftermath of the Charlie Hebdo shooting	11 January 2015	1.2 – 1.6 million	Political rally	Paris	France	An additional 2.1 – 2.5 million people marched across the world in solidarity. This gathering was the largest in French history.	
The Feast of Corpus Christi Mass during the 2026 visit by Pope Leo XIV to Spain	7 June 2026	1.2 million	Religious gathering	Madrid	Spain		
Cedar Revolution	14 March 2005	1.2 million	Political rally	Beirut	Lebanon		
La marcha más grande de Chile	25 October 2019	1.2 million	Political rally	Santiago	Chile	Part of a series of protests demanding a new constitution, reforms in Chile's education, healthcare and pension systems, among many other reforms	
Sun Myung Moon's Yeouido rally	1975	1.2 million	Religious gathering/political rally	Yoido	South Korea		
Billy Graham Crusade	1973	Over 1.1 million	Religious gathering	Yoido Plaza, Seoul	South Korea		
Ashadhi Ekadashi	Ongoing	1.1 – 1.5 million	Pilgrimage	Vithoba Temple, Pandharpur	India		
Praja Rajyam Party launch meeting	26 August 2008	1.1- 1.5 million	Political meeting	Guntur	India	Largest political meeting in Indian history	
Funeral of Enrico Berlinguer	13 June 1984	Over 1 million	Funeral	Rome	Italy		
Love Parade	25 August 2007	Over 1 million	Celebration	Essen	Germany		
Anti-FARC protest	4 February 2008	Over 1 million	Political rally	Bogotá	Colombia		
Kashmir self determination memorandum	1 March 1990	Over 1 million	Political rally	UN Military Observer Group Headquarters, Srinagar	India		
Anniversary of Muhammad's death	10 December 2015	Over 1 million	Religious gathering	Imam Reza shrine, Mashhad	Iran		
Samarra Pilgrimage	15 November 2016	Over 1 million	Pilgrimage	Al-Askari Shrine, Samarra	Iraq		
Toma de Caracas	1 September 2016	Over 1 million	Political rally	Caracas	Venezuela	Protestors demanded a recall election against President Nicolás Maduro. The gathering was called the "largest demonstration in the history of Venezuela" with over 3% of the nation's entire population.	
Denver Broncos Super Bowl 50 parade	2015	Over 1 million	Sports rally	Denver	USA		
2019–20 Hong Kong protests	9 June 2019	1.03 million	Political rally	Hong Kong	China	Protest against the 2019 Hong Kong extradition bill	
Funeral of Qasem Soleimani	6 January 2020	Over 1 million	Funeral	Tehran	Iran		
Funeral of Diana, Princess of Wales	6 September 1997	1 million	Funeral	London	UK		
Wedding of Prince William and Catherine Middleton	29 April 2011	1 million	Wedding	London	UK		
Golden Jubilee of Elizabeth II	4 June 2002	1 million	Celebration	The Mall, London	UK		
Procession in commemoration of Hans Ji Maharaj	8 October 1970	1 million	Commemoration	New Delhi	India		
Beatification of Pope John Paul II	1 May 2011	1 million	Religious gathering	Saint Peter's Square	Vatican City		
2017 pro-jallikattu protests	21 January 2017	1 million		Marina Beach, Chennai	India		
Anti-nuclear protests in the United States	12 June 1982	1 million	Political rally	Central Park, New York City	USA	Call for an end to the Cold War arms race. It was the largest anti-nuclear protest and the largest political demonstration in American history.	
Pro-People's Vote on Brexit march	23 March 2019	1 million	Political rally	London (end point: Parliament Square)	UK		
Earth Day	22 April 1990	750,000 to 1.5 million	Celebration	Central Park, New York City	USA		
Death of Zubeen Garg	21–22 September 2025	700,000 to 1.5 million	Funeral procession	Guwahati	India		

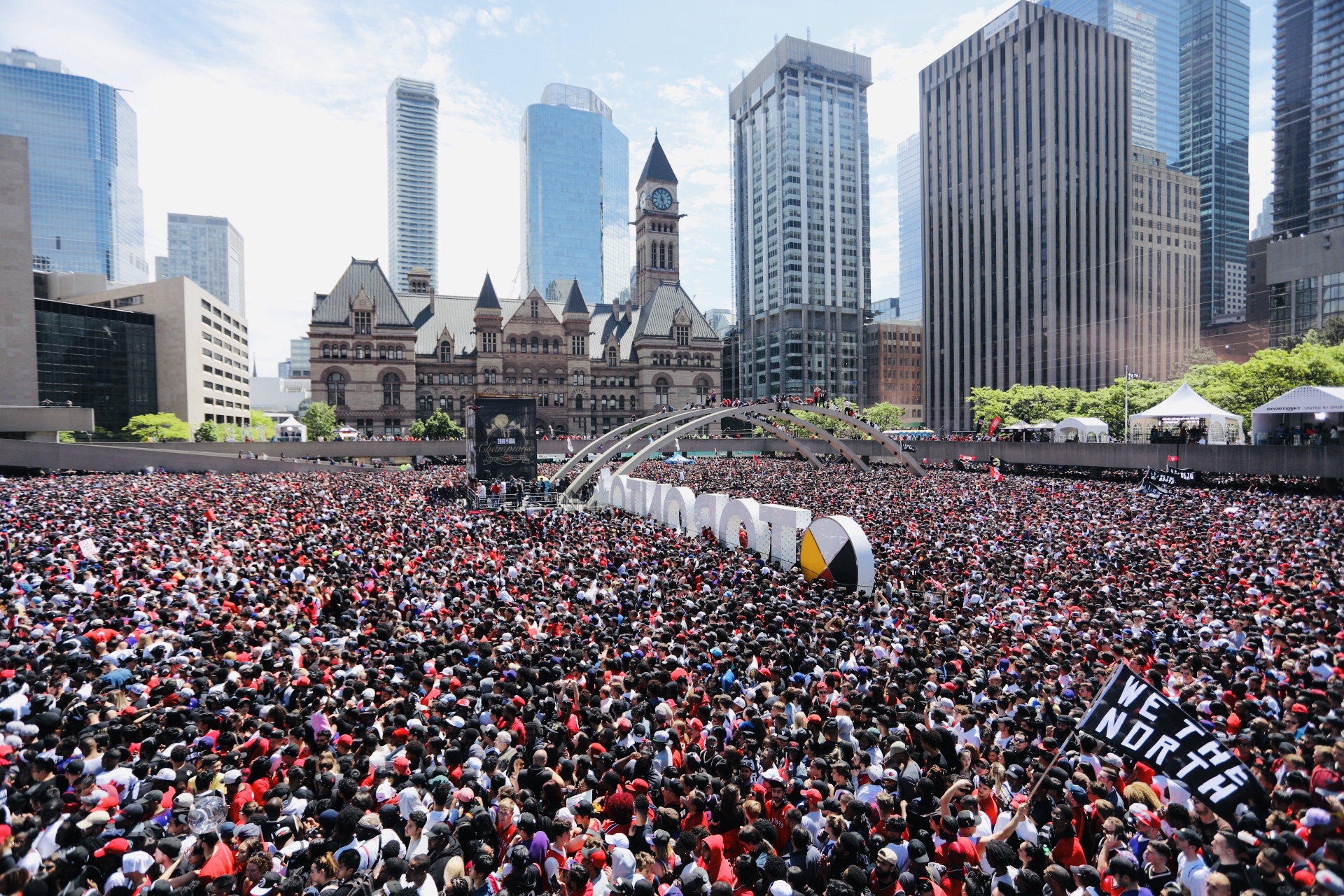
Toronto's Nathan Phillips Square on 17 June 2019, with crowds surrounding the 3D Toronto sign

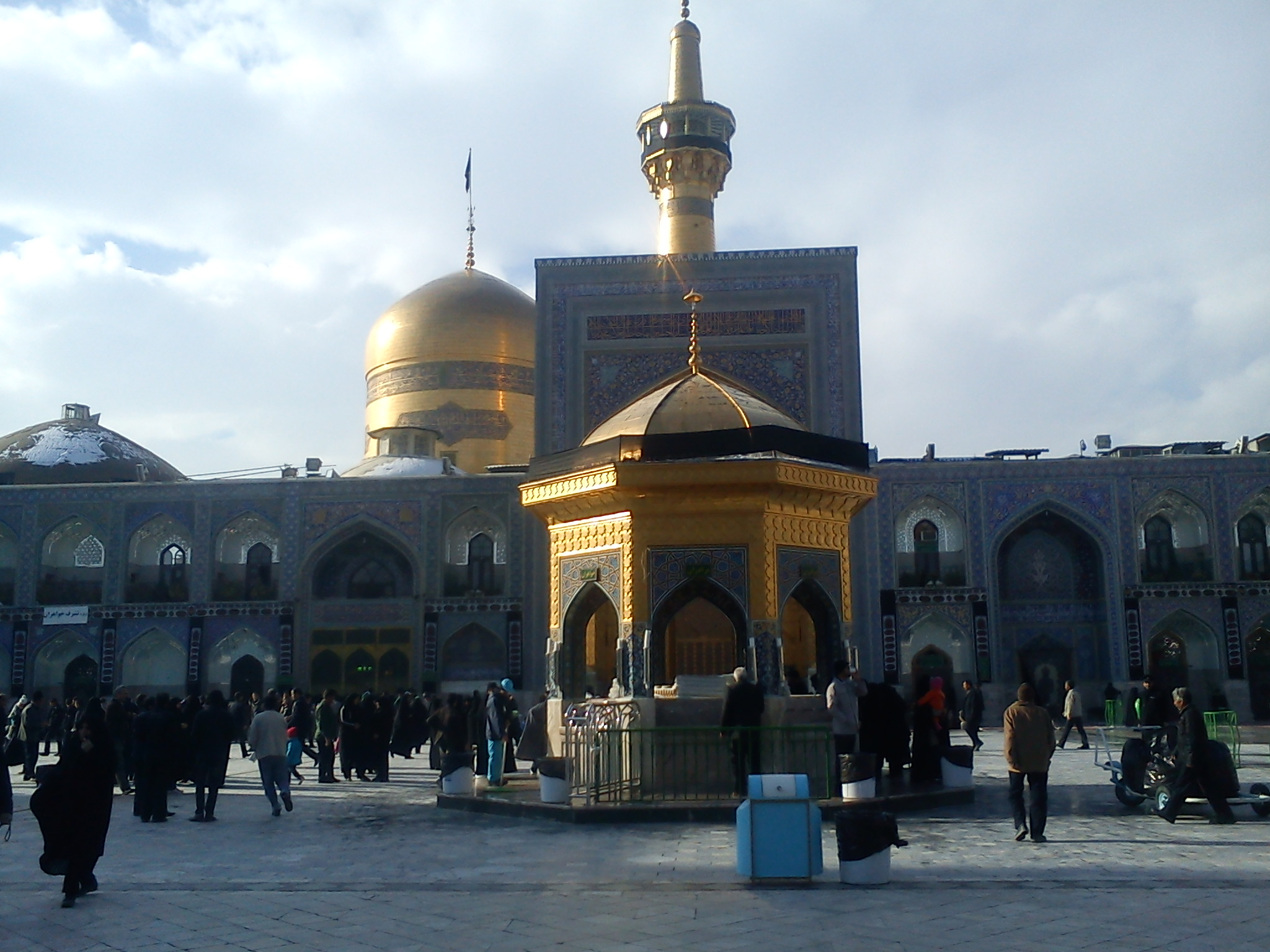
Over one million Shia Muslims on the anniversary of Muhammad's death at Imam Reza shrine in Iran on 10 December 2015

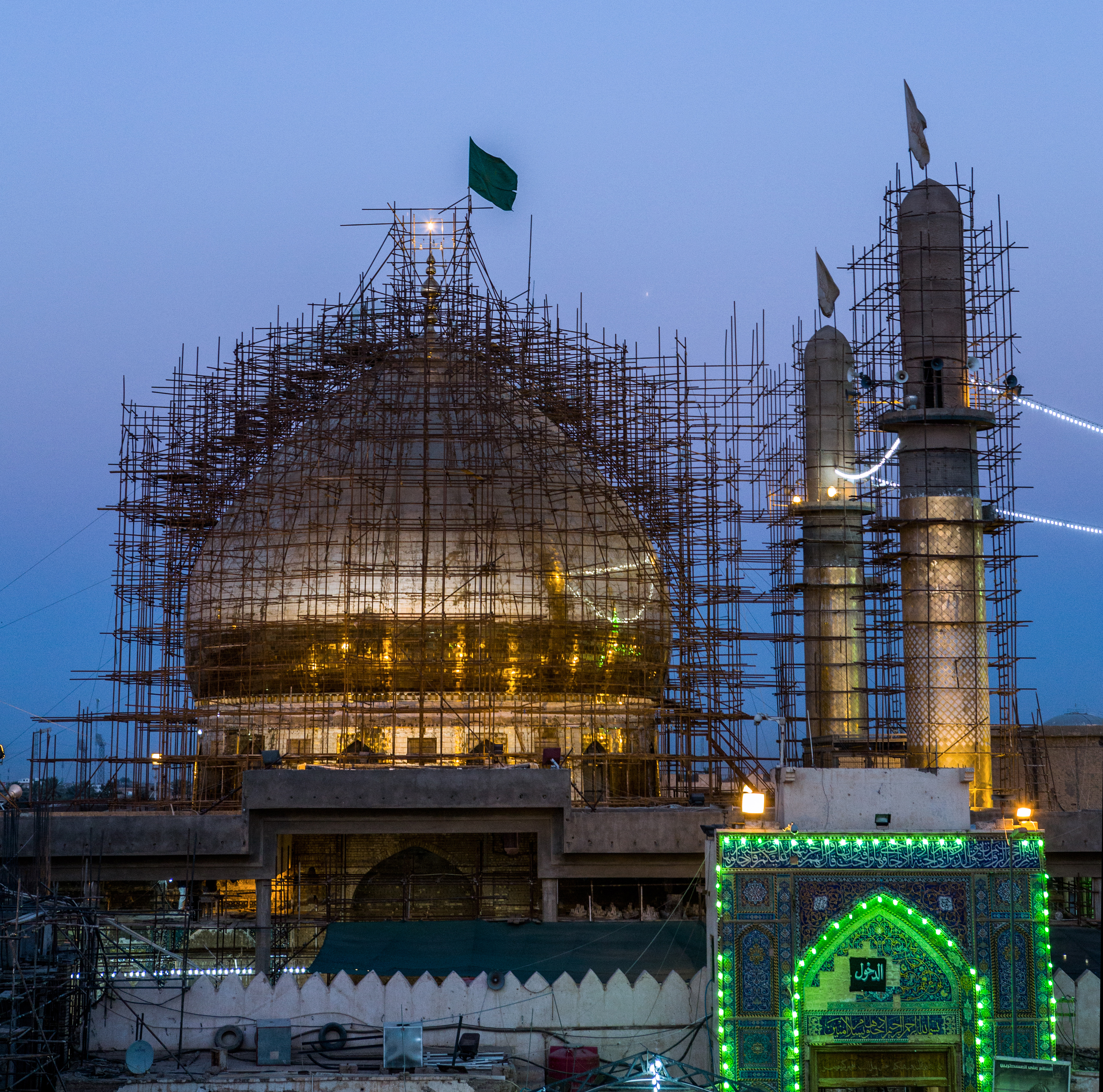
Over one million pilgrims visited the Al-Askari Shrine on 15 November 2016.

== Methodology ==
A method of determining how many people are at an event is the scientific analysis of photographs, video images, or both. Based on the quality of the image, it is possible to do a physical head count or to estimate attendance based on the density of people within similar areas. This permits the estimation of people over large areas or where parts of the image are obscured. An extensive discussion of how images were used to estimate the number of attendees at the Million Man March can be found at the Center for Remote Sensing at Boston University's website.
