= Maa Vindhyavasini Dhaam, Vindhyachal =

Hindu Shrine

Vindhyachal Temple
- विंध्याचल धाम, माँ विंध्यवासिनी शक्तिपीठ
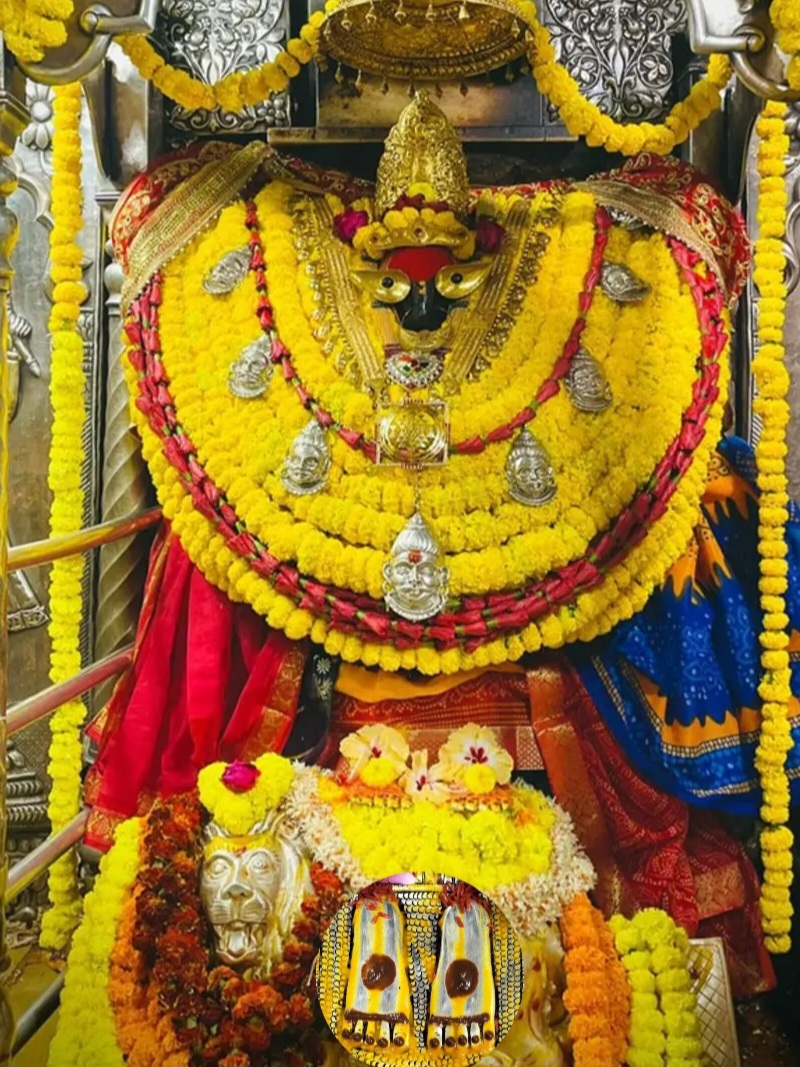
- Maa Vindhyavasini Temple, Vindhyachal

Religion
- Affiliation: Hinduism
- District: Mirzapur district
- Deity: Vindhyavasini (a form of Durga)
- Festivals: Navaratri, Kajari
- Status: Active

Location
- Location: Vindhyachal
- State: Uttar Pradesh
- Country: India

Architecture
- Type: Structural
- Style: nagara

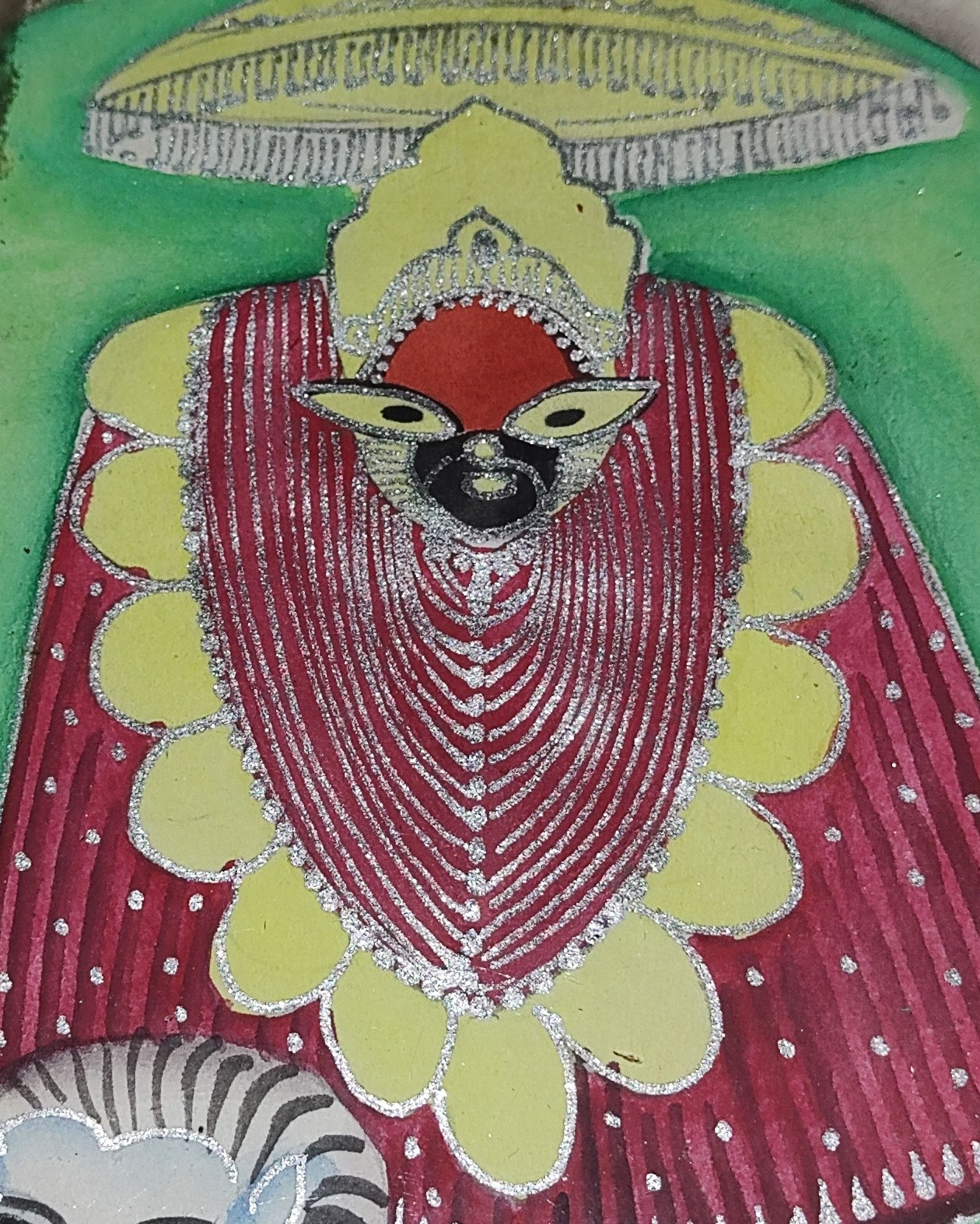
Painting of Vindhyavasini Devi

Vindhyachal Temple, also known as Maa Vindhyavasini Temple and Vindhyachal Dham, is a Hindu temple dedicated to the mother goddess Durga, situated on the bank of river Ganga at Vindhyachal in Mirzapur district, Uttar Pradesh. It is one of the Shakti Pitha temples in India.

The goddess is also known as Kajari (or Kajali) Devi, a name derived from her kohl-like complexion. On the occasion of Vindhyavasini Jayanti, the Kajari festival is organised in her honour.

According to scriptures, Vindhyachal city is also believed to be the abode of Goddess Durga. Near this place, many temples dedicated to other deities can be found. Some of them are Ashtabhuji Devi Temple and Kali Khoh Temple. It is said that the goddess chose Vidhyanchal to stay after killing the demon Mahishasura. Thousands of devotees can be seen in the temples of Vidhyanchal and this number increases even more during the days of Navaratri. The whole city is decorated with lamps and flowers during this festival.

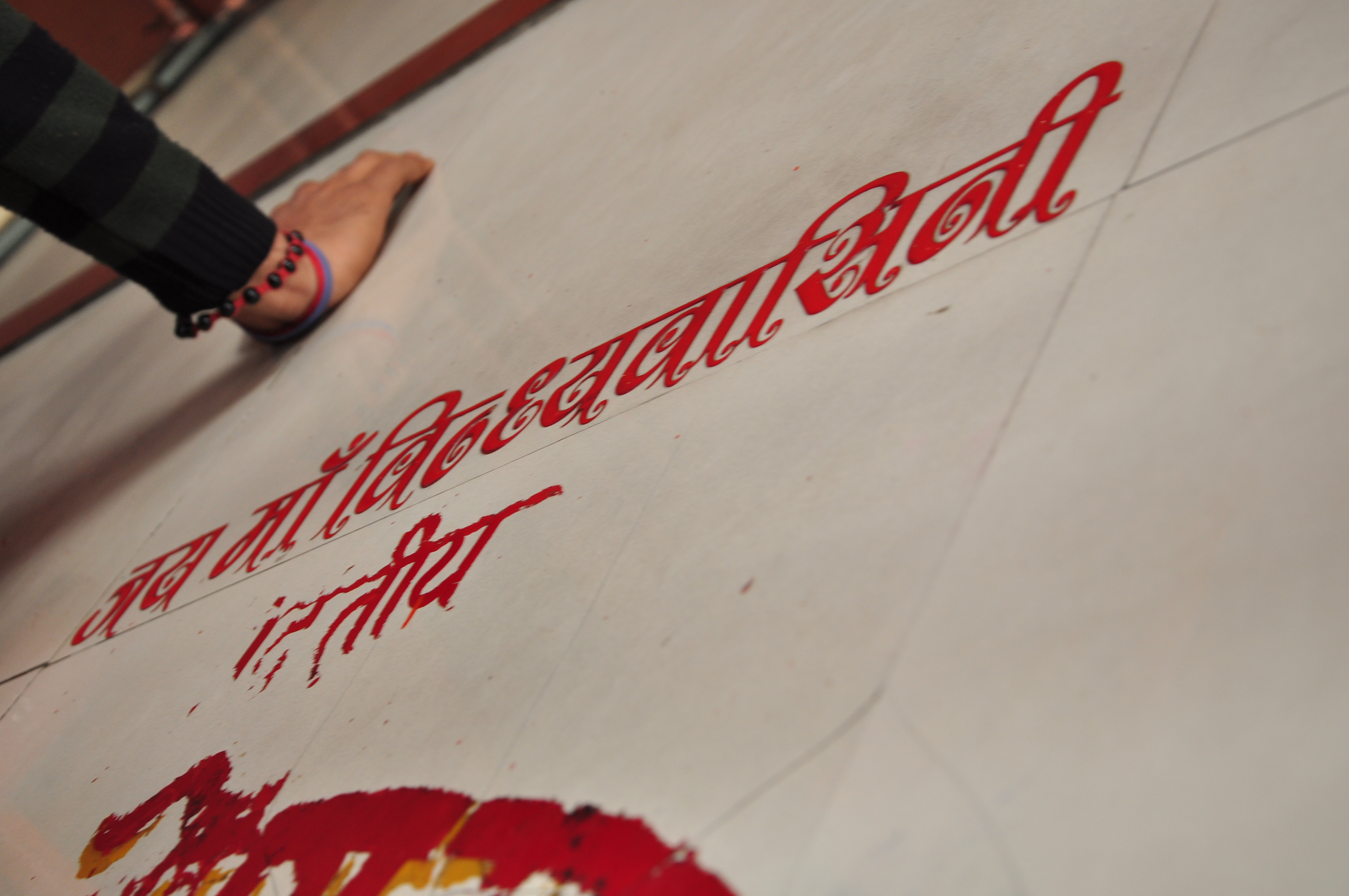
Inside Vindhyachal Temple entrance

The main deity Vindhyavasini gets her name from the Vindhya Range, literally meaning, "one who resides in Vindhya".

== History ==
The temple is believed to be the earthly abode of the goddess Durga. According to scriptures and beliefs, the goddess selected Vindhyachal as her abode after killing the bovine demon Mahishasura.

The temple has been mentioned in Durga Saptashati. It is written that the goddess Durga was born from the womb of Yashoda on the same night as Krishna was born. When Kansa (King of Mathura) tried killing the baby by smashing her body to a stone, she miraculously went away from his grip and turned into the divine form of the goddess.

Vindhyachal is the only place in the world, where all the three forms of the Goddesses, Lakshmi, Kali and Saraswati have specific temples dedicated to them.

== Accessibility ==
Lal Bahadur Shastri Airport, Varanasi, is the nearest airport to the Vindhyachal Temple, which is approximately 72 km away. Vindhyachal railway station (BDL) is the nearest railway station on the Delhi-Howrah and Mumbai-Howrah routes. It is about 1 km from the temple. One can also reach the temple from Mirzapur railway station (MZP), approximately 9 km from the temple. Vindhyachal can be reached by state-run private buses, taxis and local cars. It is connected via National Highway 2 (NH 2).

== Vindhya corridor ==
The chief minister, Yogi Adityanath's government, is constructing the Vindhya Corridor, modeled after the Kashi Vishwanath Corridor. The corridor is being built around Vindhyachal Temple at an estimated cost of ₹224 crores to facilitate pilgrimage. The corridor is being built using pink stones from Ahraura expertly crafted by the artisans from Jaipur. Maa Vindhyavasini corridor project is aimed at beautifying Maa Vindhyavasini Temple, creating a 50 ft wide space for the 'parikrama' (circumambulation) route and creating world-class facilities for the pilgrims. After the corridor's construction, Maa Vindhyavasini Temple would be visible from the bank of the Ganga.

The Trikona Parikrama at Vindhyachal, includes Vindhyachal Temple and several other temples of other deities in the vicinity, the most famous ones being Ashtabhuja Devi Temple and Kalikhoh Temple. The parikrama route constitutes, the Vindhyachal Temple dedicated to Goddess Yogmaya (Durga), Kali Khoh Temple 6 km from Vindhyavasini temple in form of ancient cave dedicated to Goddess Maha Kali (Durga for killing demon Raktabeeja), Ashtabhuja Temple dedicated to Goddess Maha Saraswati on a hillock 8 km from Vindhyavasini Temple.

== Record pilgrim numbers ==
During the 2025 Prayag Maha Kumbh Mela Hindu Pilgrimage, more than 10 million pilgrims also visited the Vindhyachal Temple. Earlier during the Navaratri in 2024, 1.5 million pilgrims had visited this temple. Thus, earning this temple pilgrimage a place among the world's largest peaceful gatherings.

== See also ==
- Vindhya Range
- Vindhyachal
