= Arjuna Miśra =

Arjuna Miśra was a Sanskrit scholar and leading commentator on the Mahābhārata in the fifteenth century. A contemporary of Govardhana Pāthaka, he came from the village of Vārendra Campāheṭṭīya in Bengal. He flourished in between 1450 and 1500 during the turbulent days of the Ganesha dynasty. Manuscripts of his work survive, with the oldest copy of his commentary dated 1534. His literary significance is evidenced by the fact that the celebrated scholar Nīlakaṇṭḥa quoted Arjuna Miśra in his Mahābhārata commentary, written at Varāṇāsī in the seventeenth century.
