= Ekanamsha =

Ancient Hindu goddess associated with Vāsudeva Kṛṣṇa

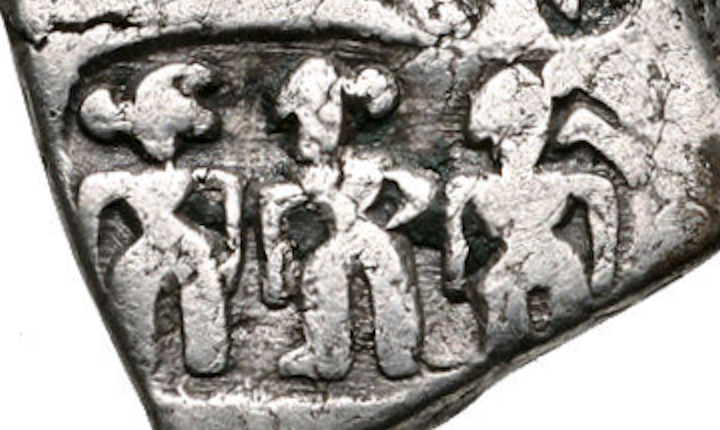
Three individuals without attributes, possibly deities Samkarsana, Vāsudeva and Ekanamsha, on a punch-marked coin, 4th-2nd century BCE.

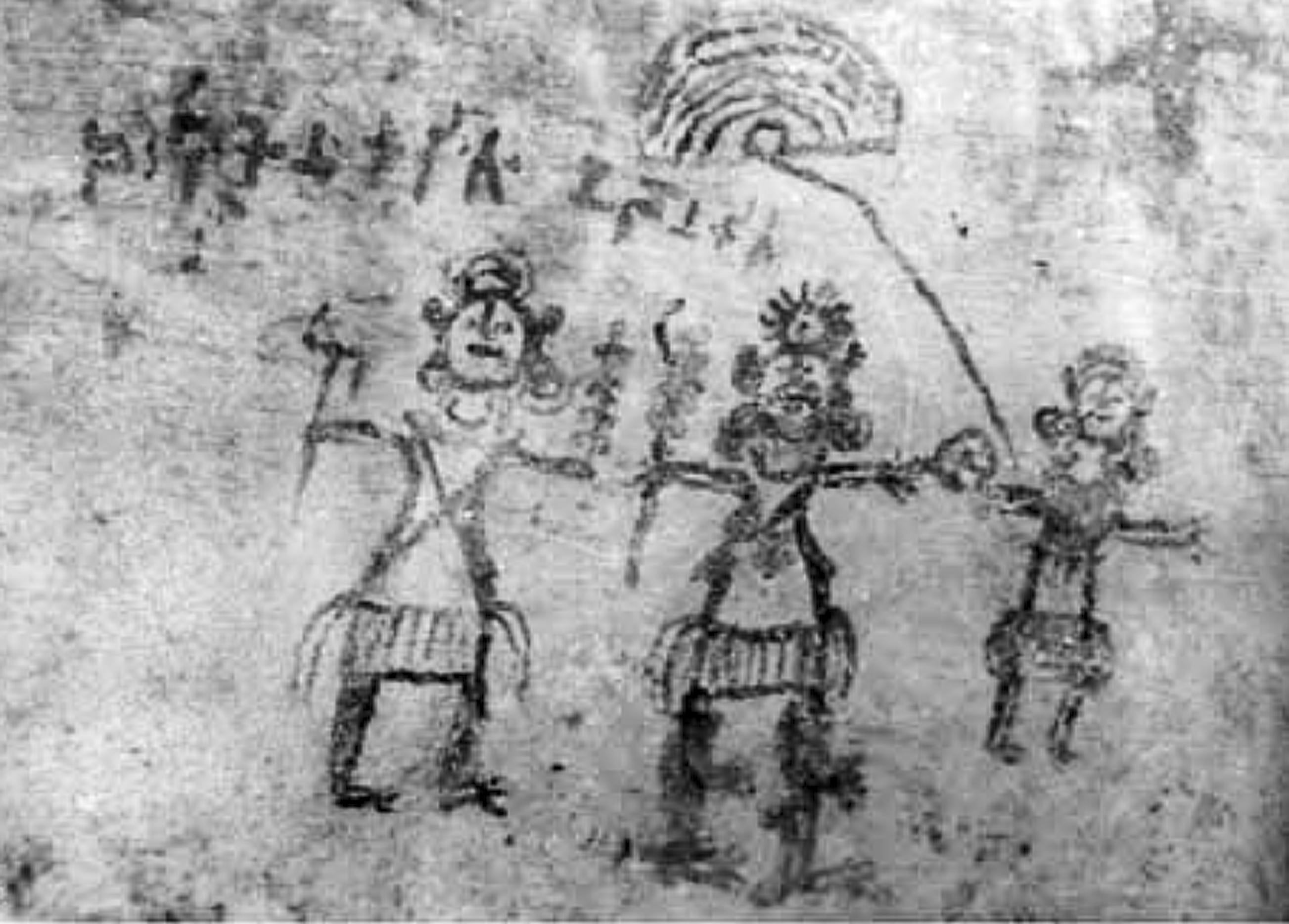
Balarama, Vāsudeva and the goddess Ekanamsha shown in a rock painting at Tikla, 3rd-2nd century BCE.

Ekanamsha (Sanskrit: एकानंशा; Ekānaṁśā) is a Hindu goddess. She is primarily identified as the illusory power of Vishnu, Yogamaya.

The goddess is believed to have been worshipped by the Vrishnis and the Abhiras. Many "kinship triads", depicting Vasudeva Krishna, Balarama, and their sister Ekanamsha have been found in the Mathura region, which are stylistically dated to the early centuries of the Common era. She is believed to have also reincarnated as the goddess Subhadra, the daughter of Vasudeva and Rohini.

== Etymology ==
In Sanskrit, Ekanamsha means "the single, portionless one", and is a name of the new moon. She is also called Ekanamsha because she alone (eka) protected Krishna at birth.

Another interpretation of her name is that the goddess Yogamaya came to be known as Ekanaṃsha because she was born of one (eka) part (aṃśa) of Vishnu himself.

== Relation to other figures ==
=== Yogamaya and Subhadra ===
Subhadra is seen as a manifestation of Ekanamsha/Yogamaya, both forms of the primordial goddess Mahadevi. According to Professor Lavanya Vemsani, Yogamaya manifests as Ekanamsha— the daughter of Nanda and Yashoda—, who then reincarnates as Subhadra. According to Devdutt Pattanaik, the scriptures don't clarify if Yogamaya becomes Subhadra after fulfilling her role, but the name 'Yogamaya' is synonymous with Subhadra in Puri, Odisha, where she is worshipped prominently.

Yogamaya facilitates Krishna's birth by being born to Nandagopa and Yashoda. Then, her place is swapped with Krishna to protect the latter from the tyrant ruler Kamsa. After warning Kamsa about his impending death, Yogamaya vanishes.

According to Professor Lavanya Vemsani, interpreting Ekanamsha, and her incarnation as Subhadra, as both lover and sister of Krishna and Balarama is misplaced.

=== Vishnu ===
In the Harivamsa, Vishnu and Ekanamsha hold complementary roles. Her work of confusing Kamsa is necessary for Vishnu to incarnate.

== Literature ==
=== Harivamsa ===
According to S. C. Mukherji, a modern scholar, in the Harivamsa, Ekanamsha is identified as a shakti of Vishnu as the goddess of Ekadasi, having descended as the daughter of Nanda to protect the baby Krishna from Kamsa. She is born to Nanda and Yashoda, and brought to Mathura by Vasudeva. Thus, Kamsa is tricked into thinking she is the ninth child of Devaki (Krishna's mother), but she is not Krishna's biological sister. When Ekanamsha leaves her infant body, the goddess is described as Narayan's consort, Katyayani, or Durga.

The text describes Ekanamsha as the goddess placed between Samkarsana (Balarama) and Krishna. She receives homage from the Yadavas, who see her as encompassing all goddesses. Indra also adopts her as a sister.

=== Vishnudharmottara Purana ===
The Vishnudharmottara Purana describes the deity as Gandhari (the power of illusion pertaining to Vishnu), and this Gandhari represents the deities Dhrti, Kirti, Pusti, Sraddha, Sarasvati, Gayatri, and Kalaratri.

=== Brahmavaivarta Purana ===
According to the Brahmavaivarta Purana, Ekanamsha is described as the avatar of Durga, who became the daughter of Nanda and Yashoda, who was taken away by Vasudeva. When Kamsa tried to kill her, she transformed into the goddess Yogamaya, & berated Kamsa for his attempt to commit infanticide. Though in other versions the baby girl is carried to the Vindhya mountains, in this text, she stays with Vasudeva and Devaki. Later, when Krishna marries his chief consort, Rukmini, she is sent with Durvasa to protect and help him.

== Iconography ==
Ekanamsha is portrayed with Krishna in the earliest Krishnaite iconography.

Kushana images from 2nd-century CE Mathura depict a triad of deities: two gods flanking a goddess. Comparable 9th-century representations in Etah and Ellora mirror this composition. This is identified as the Vrishni triad, featuring Samkarshana (Balarama), Ekanamsha, and Vāsudeva (Krishna). Here, Ekanamsha is an ancient goddess worshipped by the Vrishni people and is identified with Subhadra; later this triad becomes popular in Jagannath sect.
