= Tikla =

Archeological site and cave in Madhya Pradesh, India

Coordinates: 25.877987°N 77.762694°E

Tikla

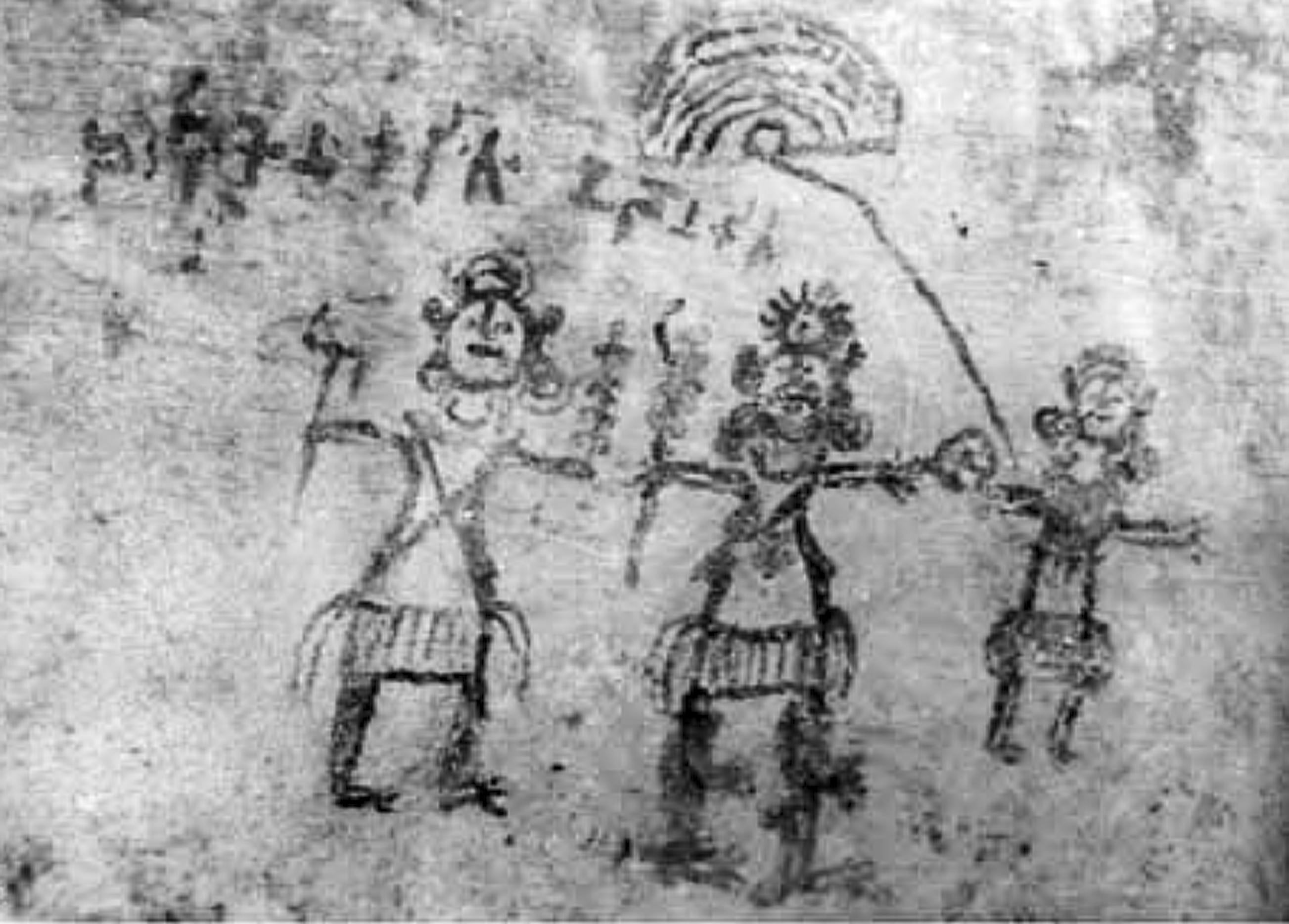
Vrishni triad shown in a rock painting at Tikla, Madhya Pradesh, 3rd-2nd century BCE. These would be Balarama, Vāsudeva and the female deity Ekanamsha. The inscription in Brahmi reads: Dambukena kāritam odanakita, probably conveying a contribution by someone named Dambuka.

Location of Tikla.

Tikla, or Tikula, is an archeological site and ancient rock shelter in Madhya Pradesh, India, known for its petroglyphs. Tikla is situated around 170 km (110 mi) south of Mathura and 50 km (31 mi) southwest of Gwalior on the Agra to Mumbai road near the town of Mohana on the right bank of the Parvati river.

Probably the earliest known Indian depiction of the Mathuran known as the Vrishni heroes, is a rock painting found at Tikla. This rock painting is dated to the 3rd-2nd century BCE, based on the paleography of the Brahmi inscription accompanying it. The deities are depicted wearing a dhoti with a peculiar headdress, and are shown holding their attributes: a plow and a sort of mace for Balarama, and a mace and a wheel for Vāsudeva. A third smaller character is added, forming what can be called a Vrishni trio, in the person of a female, thought to be the Goddess Ekanamsha, who seems to hold a Chatra royal umbrella. These depictions belong to "Period IV" of the rock shelter, and are accompanied by contemporaneous images of elephant riders, horse riders and flowers.

Tikla has a famous carved petroglyph representing a maze. It is the earliest known maze design in India, is dated to 250 BCE, and it is thought that the design was introduced with the campaigns of Alexander the Great.
