= Neelakantha Chaturdhara =

17th-century Sanskrit scholar

Neelakantha Chaturdhara (Sanskrit: नीलकण्ठ चतुर्धर, IAST: Nīlakaṇṭha Caturdhara) (also referred as Neelakantha Chaturdhar) was a scholar who lived in Varanasi in the later half of the 17th century, famous for his commentary on the Mahabharata.

== Life ==
As with most scholars of pre-modern India, little is known of his life. He was from a Marathi-speaking Deshastha Rigvedi Brahmin family that had been established in a town on the banks of the river Godavari. He moved to Varanasi, where he studied "Veda and Vedanga, Mimamsa, Srauta, Yoga, Saiva texts, Tarka, and especially Advaita Vedanta" from several teachers, before beginning his literary career. His teachers and mentors at Varanasi, which was then a hub of śāstric learning, included his guru referred to him as Lakṣmaṇārya, and Nārāyaṇa Tīrtha. His Vedanta writings were influenced by Madhusūdana Sarasvatī, Nṛsiṃhāśrama, and Appayya Dīkṣita. Nilakantha had also composed a commentary on the Devi Bhagavata Purana

== Mahabharata commentary ==
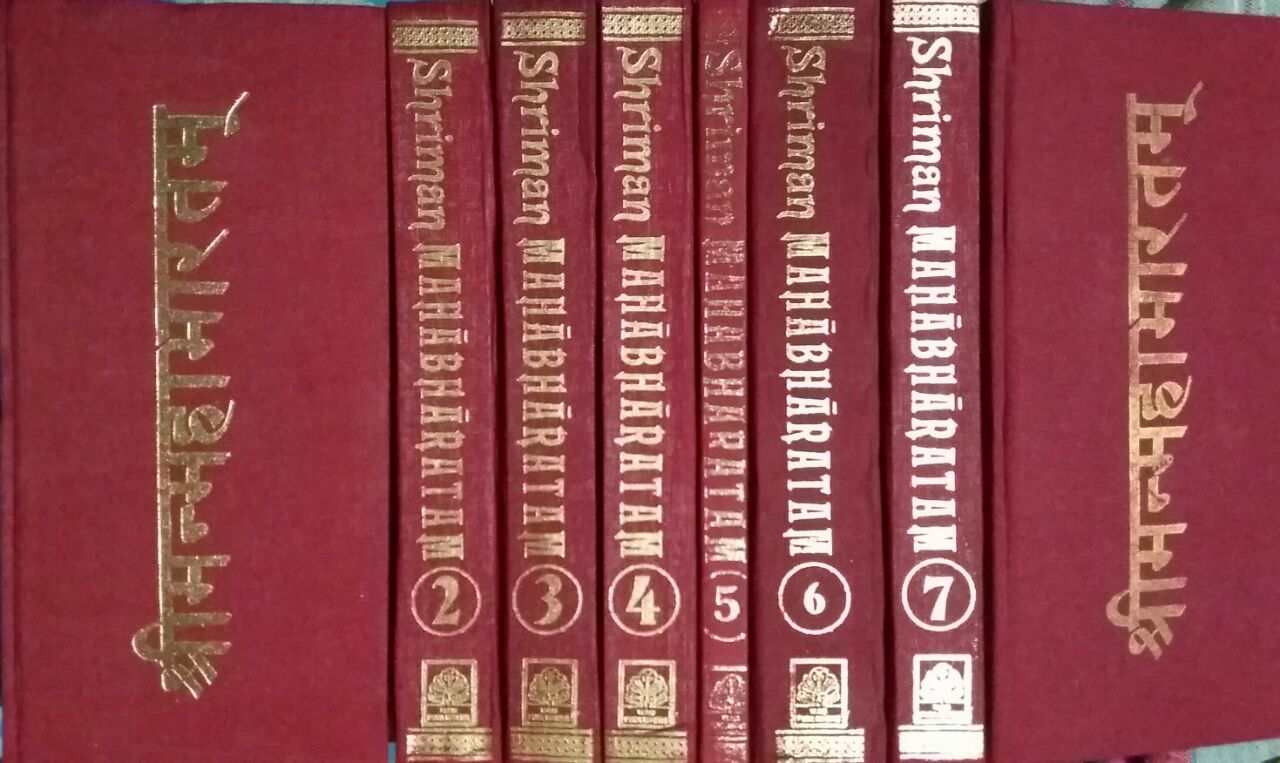
MAHABHARATA with Bhāratabhāvadīpa by Nilakantha Chaturdhara

His commentary, Bhāratabhāvadīpa, is the only one that is widely used in Sanskrit studies today. His commentary was from the viewpoint of Advaita Vedānta.

The first English-language translation of the Mahabharata, by the scholarly Kisari Mohan Ganguli, acknowledges the influence of Nilakantha's commentary. The Clay Sanskrit Library's project of translating the Mahabharata used the version known to Nilakantha rather than the critical edition.

In the recent past, he "has been maligned without warrant" by modern scholars, but his "understandings underlie more than a little of what is in the English language renderings of the epic."

== See also ==
- Arjuna Miśra
