= Yogamaya =

Hindu goddess

- Goddess of Illusion
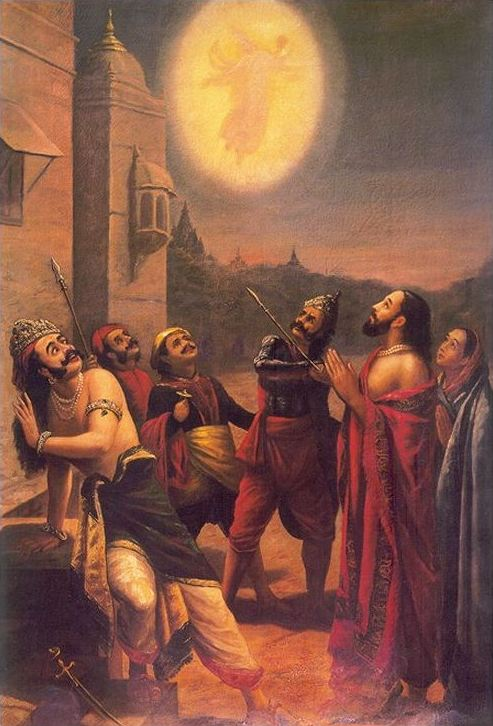
- 19th century painting by Raja Ravi Varma depicting Yogamaya (above) issuing a warning to Kamsa
- Other names: Vindhyavasini; Mahamaya; Narayani; Ekanamsha
- Venerated in: Vaishnavism; Shaktism
- Affiliation: Aspect of Vishnu or Durga (in Vaishnavism); Aspect of Mahadevi (in Shaktism)
- Abode: Vindhya Range
- Texts: Bhagavata Purana
- Temple: Vindhyavasini Devi Temple, Vindhyachal
- Festivals: Vaikuntha Ekadashi

Genealogy
- Avatar birth: Gokulam
- Parents: Nanda and Yashoda (parents of her earthly manifestation)
- Siblings: Vishnu (ceremonial brother)
- Dynasty: Yaduvamsha

Yogamaya (Sanskrit: योगमाया, lit. 'illusory potency', IAST: Yogamāyā) is a Hindu goddess who serves as the personification of Vishnu's powers of illusion. In Vaishnava tradition, she is accorded the epithet Narayani—"the sister of Narayana"—and is regarded as the benevolent aspect of the goddess Durga.

According to Hindu texts, Yogamaya plays the role of the facilitator of the earthly birth of Krishna, an avatar of Vishnu. She took the avatar of the daughter of Yadava cowherd Nanda and Yashoda, after which her place is swapped with Krishna to protect the latter from the tyrant ruler Kamsa. After warning Kamsa about his impending death, Yogamaya vanished and resided in the Vindhya hills, due to which she is accorded the epithet Vindhyavasini.

Yogamaya is also an important goddess in Shaktism sect, and is worshipped as a form of Mahadevi.

== Etymology ==
Yogamaya refers to “the internal potency of Bhagavan, that arranges and enhances all his pastimes” in the Bhagavad Gita.

The goddess Vindhyavasini gets her name from the Vindhya Range, literally meaning, "she who resides in Vindhya".

== Legend ==
At the time of the birth of Krishna as the eighth child of Devaki and Vasudeva, Yogamaya had been born at the same time at the house of Nanda and Yashoda, as instructed by Vishnu. Vasudeva replaced Krishna with this daughter of Yashoda. When Kamsa tried to kill this infant, believing that she was his prophesied killer, she escaped from the grasp of Kamsa, and turned into her form of Durga. She informed the tyrant that his killer had already been born elsewhere, and subsequently vanished from the prison of Mathura.

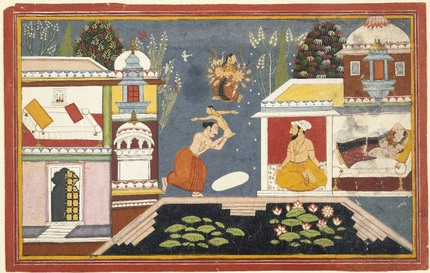
The goddess Yogamaya emerges as Kamsa kills Yashoda's daughter

The child, Yoga-māyā-devī, the younger sister of Lord Viṣṇu, slipped upward from Kaṁsa’s hands and appeared in the sky as Devī, the goddess Durgā, with eight arms, completely equipped with weapons

— Srimad Bhagavatam, Canto 10, Chapter 4, Verse 9

O Kaṁsa, you fool, what will be the use of killing me? The Supreme Personality of Godhead, who has been your enemy from the very beginning and who will certainly kill you, has already taken His birth somewhere else. Therefore, do not unnecessarily kill other children

— Srimad Bhagavatam, Canto 10, Chapter 4, Verse 12

Thereafter, she is believed by local lore to have chosen to reside at the Vindhyachala mountains, where her temple is located at present.

== Shaktism ==
Authors Constance Jones and James D. Ryan opine that Vindhyavasini is mentioned in the Devi Mahatmya, an important text that presents various incarnations or forms of the Supreme Goddess of Shaktism (Mahadevi). She is also mentioned in an early 19th-century local text called Vindhya Mahatmya. In both, she is understood to be the Ultimate Reality in its totality. She is also assimilated with Parvati, conceived of as "ultimate divinity".

== Vaishnavism ==
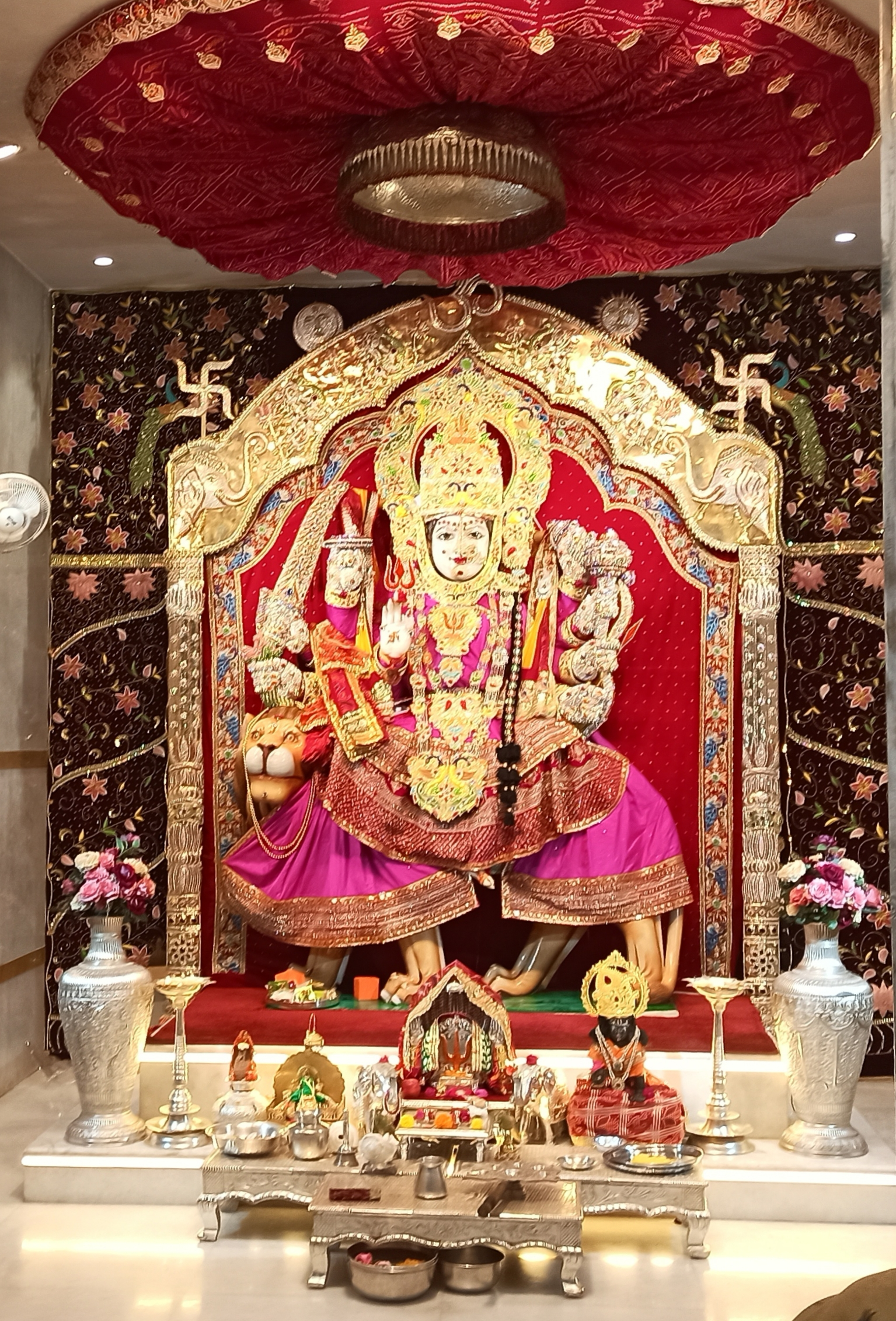
Shrine of the goddess Narayani, Lonavala

Yogamaya is regarded to be the embodiment of either the internal or the external potency of Vishnu, or his avatar of Krishna, in Vaishnavism. The goddess, also referred to as Vaishnavi Mahamaya, assumes a number of manifestations like Durga, Ambika, Kshemada, and Bhadrakali, according to the Vishnu Purana.

In the Bhagavata Purana, the asura Hiranyaksha mocks Varaha and references Vishnu's Yogamaya:

Are you employed by our enemies for destroying us? You kill Asuras by Māyā and thus conquer them by fraudulent means. Oh dunce, I shall wipe out the sorrows of my friends by killing you, whose strength lies in yoga-māyā, but have little personal bravery.

— Bhagavata Purana, Chapter 18

According to a 17th century literary poem called the Mukundavilasa, when Bhudevi and Brahma petition Vishnu to intervene in earthly affairs due to the oppression of Kamsa and Shishupala, he recruits a number of deities to assist him in his Krishna avatar: Lakshmi is to be born as Rukmini, Bhudevi is to manifest as Satyabhama, Shesha is to incarnate as Balarama, and Yogamaya is tasked to be born as the daughter of Yashoda.

In the narratives of Krishna, the deity employs the phenomenon of Yogamaya in order to spend time with the cowherd women of Gokulam, the gopis. During his blissful dalliance with the gopis, it is Yogamaya who creates spiritual doppelgangers of each gopi at their houses so that they can also act as chaste wives to their husbands, while also dwelling on the deity.

In the Bhagavad Gita, when Arjuna wonders why Krishna's pastimes and true form are not visible to mortals, he responds by stating that his manifestations are not visible to all men, and that he is veiled by his illusory potency.

When the asura Jalandhara wages a war against Shiva to abduct Parvati, Vishnu employs Yogamaya as an illusory form to break the chastity of the asura's wife, Vrinda. This allows Shiva to prevail in his war.

Due to Yogamaya's service to Vishnu, the deity offers her the occasion of Ekadashi (the eleventh day of every month) for veneration in her honour.

== Temples ==
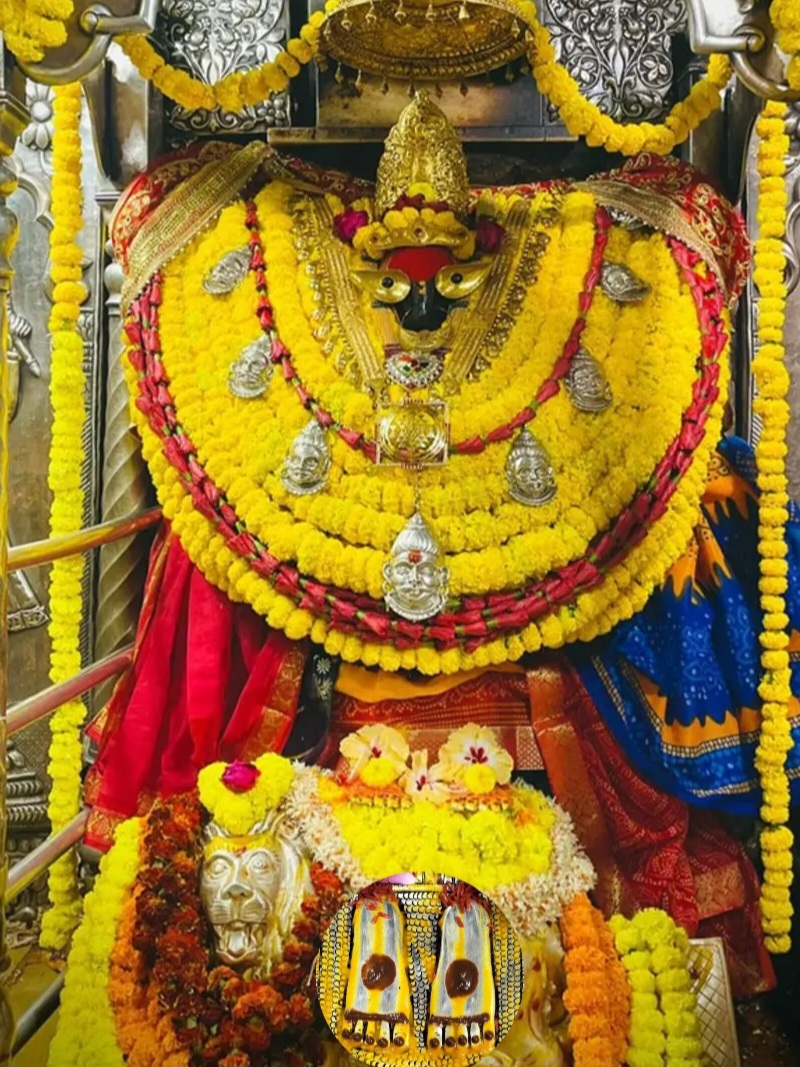
Shrine of Vindhyavasini, near Mirzapur

- Mirzapur, Uttar Pradesh: Yogamaya's temple is located at Vindhyachal, 8 km away from Mirzapur on the banks of river Ganges, in Uttar Pradesh. A huge crowd visits the temple, especially during Navaratri in the Hindu months of Chaitra and Ashvin. In the month of Jyeshtha, the Kajali competition, is held here. The temple is one of the most revered Shakta pithas of India. The Vindhyavasini Devi is also known popularly by name of Kajala devi. The goddess Kali is adorned in the form of Vindhyavasini Devi. There is a nearby temple of Saraswati named Ashtbhuja Temple, 3 km away on a hillock, and a temple of goddess Kali in cave called Kali khoh temple. The pilgrims prefer to visit these three temples, which is a part of rite called Trilokan Parikrama.
- Sehore, Madhya Pradesh: The shrine of Bijasan Mata Temple in Salkanpur is located 70 kms away from Bhopal.
- New Delhi: The Yogmaya or Jogmaya temple in Mehrauli, New Delhi is said to have been built by the Pandavas at the end of the Mahabharata war. Jain scriptures from the twelfth century state that the ancient city of Mehrauli was once called Yoginipura after the temple.
- Ernakulam, Kerala: Goddess Durga in her incarnation as Yoga-Nidra or Yogamaya is worshiped in the sacred forest temple of Iringole Kavu, situated in the state's Ernakulam district. This temple is one of Kerala's famed kavu, or sacred grove. It is also considered to be one among the 108 Durga temples in the state consecrated by Lord Parasurama himself.
- Nepal: There is also a temple dedicated to this goddess in Pokhara named Bindhyabasini Temple.

== See also ==
- Shakta pithas
- Rukmini
- Yashoda
- Subhadra
