= Vindhyachal =

Coordinates: 25°10′N 82°30′E

- City
- Location in Uttar Pradesh, India Vindhyachal (India)
- Country: India
- State: Uttar Pradesh
- District: Mirzapur

Population (2001)
  - Total: 205,264

Language
  - Official: Hindi
  - Additional official: Urdu
  - Native language: Bhojpuri
- Time zone: UTC+5:30 (IST)
- Vehicle registration: UP-63

Vindhyachal is a city in Mirzapur district of the Indian state of Uttar Pradesh. The city is a Hindu pilgrimage site having the temple of Vindhyavasini, who according to Markandeya Purana, had incarnated to kill the demon Mahishasura. A detailed description has been given in the 'Durga Saptashati' chapter of the Markandeya Purana. The river Ganga flows through this city. The Indian Standard Time (IST) line passes through the Vindhyachal railway station.

== Maa Vindhyavasini temple ==
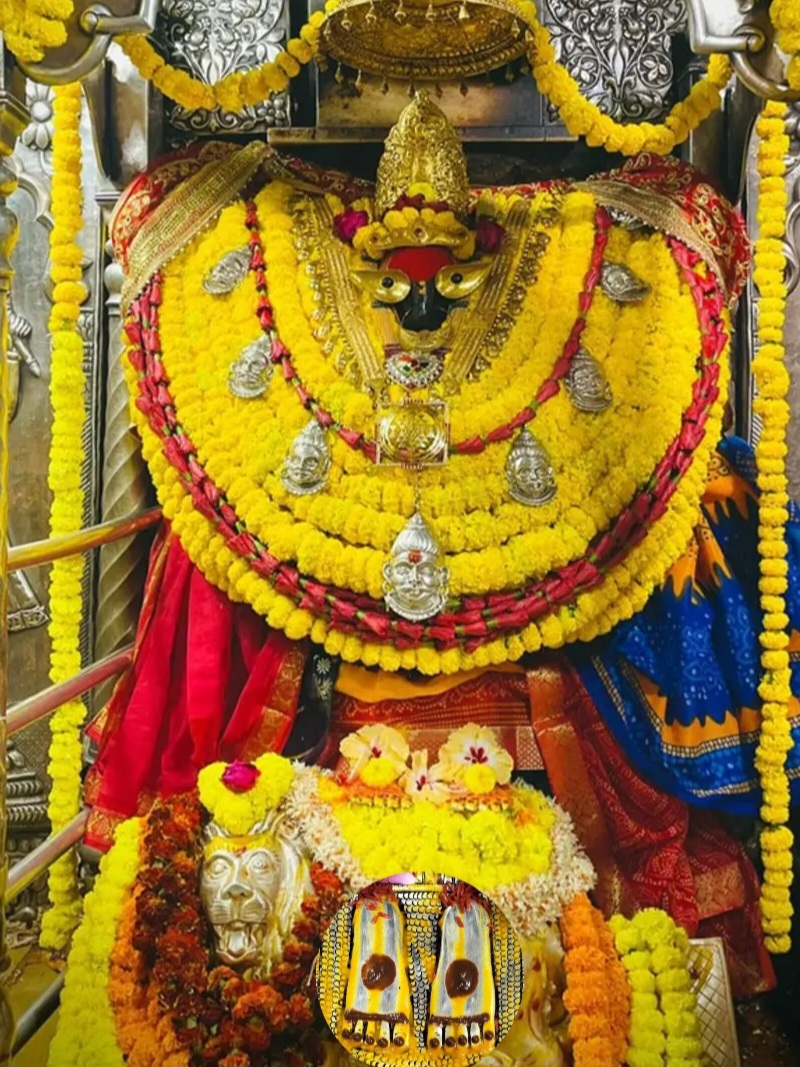
Vindhyavasini mata

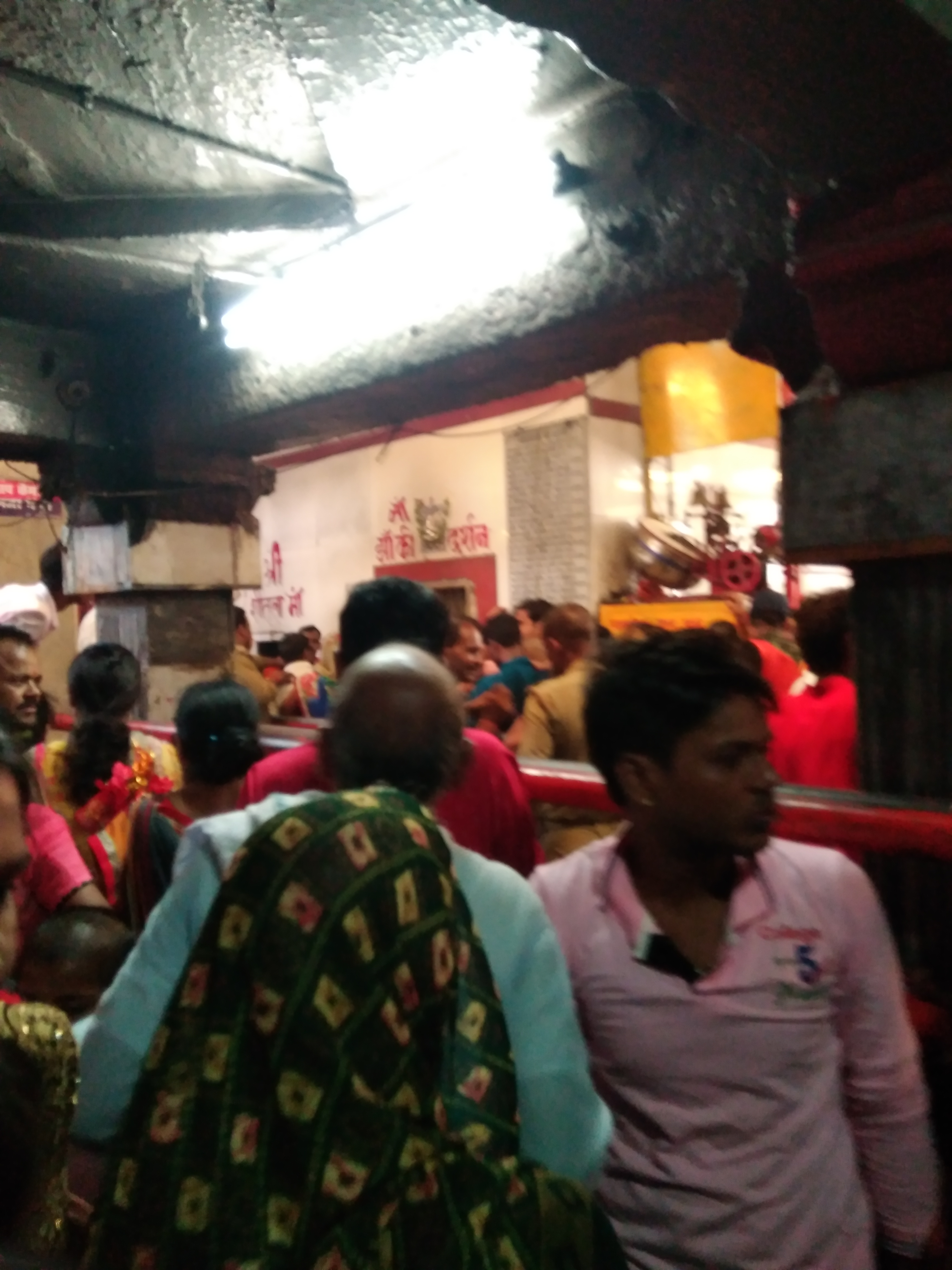
Crowded Vindhyavasini temple

Vindhyachal is located at a distance of 65 km from Varanasi and 85 km from Prayagraj. It is a renowned religious city dedicated to the goddess Vindhyavasini (daughter of Yashoda-Nanda). Vindhyavasini is believed to be the instant bestower of benediction. The Vindhyavasini Devi Temple is situated 8 km from Mirzapur, on the banks of the holy river Ganga. It is one of the most revered Siddhapeeths of Vindhyavasini. The temple is visited by a large number of people daily. Big congregations are held during Navratras in Chaitra (April) and Ashwin (October) months. Kajali competitions are held in the month of Jyestha (June). The temple is situated just 2 km from the Kali Khoh. Currently, the whole Vindhyavasini temple complex is being renovated at a big level in the name of Government controlled project 'Vindhya Corridor'.

== Trikona Parikrama ==
There are several temples of other deities in the vicinity, the most famous ones being Ashtabhuja Devi Temple and Kalikhoh Temple. There is parikrama (circumambulation) which constitutes:

1. Maa Vindhyavasini Devi Temple, dedicated to Goddess Yogmaya (Durga).
2. Kali Khoh Temple, in form of ancient cave dedicated to Goddess Maha Kali (6 km from Vindhyavasini temple) Here, the deity represents an incarnation of Hindu Goddess Durga, for killing demon Raktabeeja.
3. Ashtabhuja Temple, dedicated to Goddess Maha Saraswati (on a hillock, 8 km from Vindhyavasini Temple).

== Important Places in Trikona Parikrama ==
1. Kankali Devi temple, dedicated to Maa Kali in the form of a skeleton, as described in the 11th chapter of Durgasaptashati (Markandeya Puran)
2. Shiv Samooh Awadhoot Ashram, a centre point (Bindu) of naturally formed Shri Chakra, Near Gerua Talab. The place where Maharishi Lalbhatta Maharaj attained Nirvikalpa samadhi. Awadhoot Kripanandnath continued this lineage. Samooh celebrates its foundation day on the pious occasion of Basant Panchmi every year. Saadhna shivirs are organised by smooth on different occasions at this place.

== Demographics ==
As per provisional data of 2011 census, Mirzapur-cum-Vindyachal urban agglomeration had a population of 245,817, out of which males were 131,534 and females were 114,283. The population in the age range of 0–6 years was 29,619. The effective literacy rate of the population 7 years and above was 77.85 per cent.

As of 2001 India census Vindyachal and Mirzapur were together considered a single census entity: a municipal board tagged as 'Mirzapur-cum-Vindhyachal'. It had a population of 205,264, of which males were 109,872 and females 95,392. The population between 0 and 6 years was 28,666. The crude literacy rate was 62.9% and the effective literacy rate was 72.1%.

Bhojpuri is the local language spoken in the city.

== City ==
Vindhyachal, a Shakti Peeth, is a centre of pilgrimage in Mirzapur district, Uttar Pradesh. The Vindhyavasini Devi temple located here is a major draw and is thronged by hundreds of devotees during the Navratris of Chaitra and Ashwin months to invoke the blessings of the Goddess.

Other sacred places in the town are Ashtbhuja temple, Sita Kund, Kali Khoh, Budeh Nath temple, Narad Ghat, Gerua talab, Motiya talab, Lal Bhairav and Kal Bhairav temples, Ekdant Ganesh, Sapta Sarovar, Sakshi Gopal temple, Goraksha-kund, Matsyendra kund, Tarkeshwar Nath temple, Kankali Devi temple, Shivashiv Samooh Awadhoot Ashram and Bhairav kund. Mirzapur is the closest railhead. Vindhyachal has regular bus services to the nearby towns. The nearest railway station is Mirzapur. Some of the important trains also halt at Vindhyachal railway Station (Code: BDL). Regular bus services connect Vindhyachal to the nearby towns.

== Attractions ==
- Vindhyavasini Devi Temple
