= Kasautii Zindagii Kay =

Kasautii Zindagii Kay (lit. 'Touchstone of Life' or 'Trial of Life') may refer to:

- Kasautii Zindagii Kay (2001 TV series), an Indian soap opera
- Kasautii Zindagii Kay (2018 TV series), an Indian soap opera, reboot of the 2001 series
