= Asian Viewers Television Awards =

Asian television awards

- Location: London
- Country: United Kingdom
- Hosted by: Karan Tacker (2014–present)
- First award: 2014
- Website: Asian Viewers Television Awards

Television/radio coverage
- Network: B4U Music (2014)

Asian Viewers Television Awards, also known as AVTA, is an annual award show event held in London which honours the best of Asian Television. Helmed by Rajan Singh, it was first awarded in 2014.

== History ==
First held in 2014, the event is helmed by Rajan Singh. It is held annually in London. The nominations and winners are decided on the basis of votes received by the viewers.

Indian actor and host Karan Tacker has been hosting the event since the past six years.

== Ceremonies ==
Year	Ceremony	Host	Venue	Reference
2014	1st Asian Viewers Television Awards	Karan Tacker	Lancaster Hotel	
2015	2nd Asian Viewers Television Awards	Karan Tacker		
2016	3rd Asian Viewers Television Awards	Karan Tacker	Jumeirah Carlton Tower	
2017	4th Asian Viewers Television Awards	Karan Tacker	Hilton, London Heathrow Airport	
2018	5th Asian Viewers Television Awards	Karan Tacker	Hilton, London Heathrow Airport	
2019	6th Asian Viewers Television Awards	Karan Tacker	Hilton, London Heathrow Airport	
2026	7th Asian Viewers Television Awards	Karan Tacker		

== Male Actor of the Year ==
Year	Actor	Character	Show
2014	Vivian Dsena	Rishabh Kundra	Madhubala – Ek Ishq Ek Junoon
2014	Ashish Sharma	Rudra Pratap Ranawat	Rangrasiya
2014	Harshad Arora	Zain Abdullah	Beintehaa
2015	Gautam Rode	Saraswatichandra Vyas	Saraswatichandra
2015	Parth Samthaan	Manik Malhotra	Kaisi Yeh Yaariaan
2015	Mishkat Varma	Kabir Kumar	Nisha Aur Uske Cousins
2015	Karan Patel	Raman Bhalla	Yeh Hai Mohabbatein
2015	Shakti Arora	Ranveer Vaghela	Meri Aashiqui Tum Se Hi
2016	Nakuul Mehta	Shivaay Singh Oberoi	Ishqbaaaz
2016	Namik Paul	Shravan Malhotra	Ek Duje Ke Vaaste
2016	Shaheer Sheikh	Dev Dixit	Kuch Rang Pyar Ke Aise Bhi
2016	Shantanu Maheshwari	Swayam Shekhawat	Dil Dosti Dance
2016	Varun Kapoor	Sanskar Maheshwari	Swaragini
2016	Vivian Dsena	Harman Singh	Shakti - Astitva Ke Ehsaas Ki
2017	Nakuul Mehta	Shivaay Singh Oberoi	Ishqbaaaz
2017	Mohsin Khan	Kartik Goenka	Yeh Rishta Kya Kehlata Hai
2017	Vivian Dsena	Harman Singh	Shakti - Astitva Ke Ehsaas Ki
2018	Harshad Chopda	Aditya Hooda	Bepannah
2018	Nakuul Mehta	Shivaay Singh Oberoi	Ishqbaaaz
2018	Sharad Malhotra	Raunak Singh	Muskaan
2019	Harshad Chopda	Aditya Hooda	Bepannah
2019	Parth Samthaan	Anurag Basu	Kasautii Zindagii Kay
2019	Mohsin Khan	Kartik Goenka	Yeh Rishta Kya Kehlata Hai
2026	TBA		
2026	TBA		
2026	TBA		

== Female Actor of the Year ==
Year	Actor	Character	Show
2014	Sanaya Irani	Parvati Ranawat	Rangrasiya
2014	Drashti Dhami	Madhubala Chaudhary	Madhubala – Ek Ishq Ek Junoon
2014	Preetika Rao	Aliya Haider	Beintehaa
2015	Divyanka Tripathi	Dr. Ishita Iyer	Yeh Hai Mohabbatein
2015	Sanaya Irani	Parvati Ranawat	Rangrasiya
2015	Jennifer Winget	Kumud Desai	Saraswatichandra
2015	Aneri Vajani	Nisha Gangwal	Nisha Aur Uske Cousins
2015	Radhika Madan	Ishani Vaghela	Meri Aashiqui Tum Se Hi
2016	Erica Fernandes	Dr. Sonakshi Bose	Kuch Rang Pyar Ke Aise Bhi
2016	Divyanka Tripathi	Dr. Ishita Iyer	Yeh Hai Mohabbatein
2016	Helly Shah	Swara Maheshwari	Swaragini
2016	Nikita Dutta	Suman Tiwari	Ek Duje Ke Vaaste
2016	Surbhi Chandna	Annika Trivedi	Ishqbaaaz
2016	Vrushika Mehta	Sharon Rai Prakash	Dil Dosti Dance
2017	Surbhi Chandna	Annika Trivedi	Ishqbaaaz
2017	Rubina Dilaik	Soumya Singh	Shakti - Astitva Ke Ehsaas Ki
2017	Shivangi Joshi	Naira Singhania	Yeh Rishta Kya Kehlata Hai
2018	Surbhi Chandna	Annika Trivedi	Ishqbaaaz
2018	Jennifer Winget	Zoya Siddiqui	Bepannah
2018	Erica Fernandes	Dr. Sonakshi Bose	Kuch Rang Pyar Ke Aise Bhi
2019	Erica Fernandes	Prerna Sharma	Kasautii Zindagii Kay
2019	Jennifer Winget	Zoya Siddiqui	Bepannah
2019	Shivangi Joshi	Naira Singhania	Yeh Rishta Kya Kehlata Hai
2026	TBA		
2026	TBA		
2026	TBA		

== Supporting Actor of the Year ==
Year	Actor	Character	Show
2014	Mohit Sehgal	Haider Sheikh	Qubool Hai
2014	Indresh Malik	Bittu Sharma	Madhubala – Ek Ishq Ek Junoon
2014	Naved Aslam	Usman Abdullah	Beintehaa

== Soap of the Year ==
Year	Show	Production House
2014	Rangrasiya	Tequila Shots Productions
2014	Beintehaa	Fortune Productions
2014	Madhubala – Ek Ishq Ek Junoon	Nautanki Films
2015	Yeh Hai Mohabbatein	Balaji Telefilms
2015	Rangrasiya	Tequila Shots Productions
2015	Meri Aashiqui Tum Se Hi	Balaji Telefilms
2015	Nisha Aur Uske Cousins	Bodhi Tree Productions
2015	Maha Kumbh: Ek Rahasaya, Ek Kahani	Arvind Babbal Productions
2016	Kuch Rang Pyar Ke Aise Bhi	Inspire Films
2016	Ek Duje Ke Vaaste	Bindu and SJ Studios
2016	Ishqbaaaz	4 Lions Films
2016	Shakti — Astitva Ke Ehsaas Ki	Rashmi Sharma Telefilms
2016	Swaragini	Rashmi Sharma Telefilms
2017	Ishqbaaaz	4 Lions Films
2017	Kumkum Bhagya	Balaji Telefilms
2017	Yeh Rishta Kya Kehlata Hai	Director's Kut Productions
2018	Ishqbaaaz	4 Lions Films
2018	Bepannah	Cinevistaas Limited
2018	Yeh Rishta Kya Kehlata Hai	Director's Kut Productions
2019	Bepannah	Cinevistaas Limited
2019	Kasautii Zindagii Kay	Balaji Telefilms
2019	Yeh Rishta Kya Kehlata Hai	Director's Kut Productions
2026	TBA	
2026	TBA	
2026	TBA	

== Reality Programme of the Year ==
Year	Show	Channel
2014	Nach Baliye	Star Plus
2014	Bigg Boss	Colors TV
2014	Jhalak Dikhhla Jaa	Colors TV
2015	Jhalak Dikhhla Jaa	Colors TV
2015	Nach Baliye	Star Plus
2015	Bigg Boss	Colors TV
2015	India's Got Talent	Colors TV
2015	Dance India Dance	Zee TV
2016	Jhalak Dikhhla Jaa	Colors TV
2016	Bigg Boss	Colors TV
2016	Dance Plus	Star Plus
2017	Bigg Boss	Colors TV
2017	Dance Plus	Star Plus
2017	Sa Re Ga Ma Pa L'il Champs	Zee TV
2018	Indian Idol	Sony TV
2018	Bigg Boss	Colors TV
2018	Dance Plus	Star Plus
2019	Dance Plus	Star Plus
2019	Bigg Boss	Colors TV
2019	Nach Baliye	Star Plus
2026	TBA	
2026	TBA	
2026	TBA	

== Best of British ==
Year	Show	Channel
2015	Britain's Got Talent	ITV
2015	Desi Rascals	Sky One
2015	EastEnders	BBC One
2016	Britain's Got Talent	ITV
2016	EastEnders	BBC One
2016	Great British Bake Off	BBC One
2016	Great British Menu	BBC Two
2016	Sherlock	BBC One
2017	Sherlock	BBC One
2017	EastEnders	BBC One
2017	Great British Bake Off	BBC One

== Channel Awards ==
Year	Channel Of The Year						
Year	General Entertainment Channel				News Channel		Music Channel
Year	Hindi	Urdu	Punjabi	Bengali	Hindi	Urdu	Music Channel
2014	Star Plus	Hum TV	N/A	N/A	NDTV 24x7	N/A	B4U Music
2015	Star Plus	Hum TV	Zee Punjabi	NTV	ABP News	N/A	B4U Music
2016	Star Plus	Geo TV	Zee Punjabi	Bangla TV	ABP News	N/A	B4U Music
2017	Star Plus	Hum TV	Zee Punjabi	Channel S	ABP News	N/A	B4U Music
2018	Star Plus	Hum TV	PTC Punjabi	Channel S	Aaj Tak	Geo News	B4U Music
2019	Star Plus	Hum TV	PTC Punjabi	ATN Bangla	ABP News	Geo News	B4U Music
2024							

== News Presenter of the Year ==
Year	Presenter	Channel
2014	Barkha Dutt	NDTV
2014	Charul Malik	ABP News
2014	Ravish Kumar	NDTV

== Lifetime Achievement Award ==
- 2018: Javed Hussain

== See also ==
- List of Asian television awards
