= Annu Kapoor =

Indian actor and RJ (born 1956)

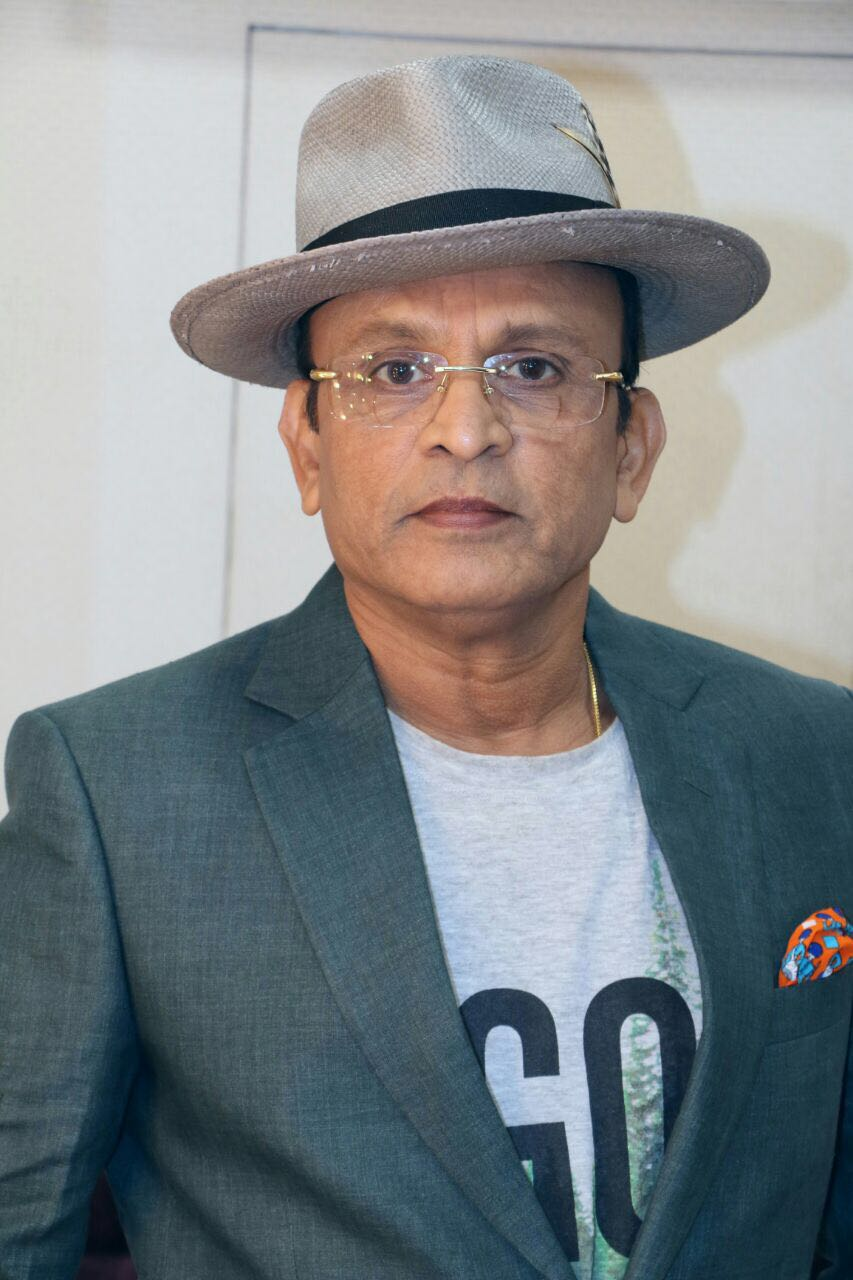
- Kapoor in 2016
- Born: Anil Kapoor; 20 February 1956 (age 70); Bhopal, Bhopal State, India (present-day Madhya Pradesh),
- Education: National School of Drama
- Occupations: Actor; television presenter; radio presenter; singer; film director; producer
- Years active: 1979–present
- Spouses: Anupama Patel (m. 1992; div. 1993) (m. 2008) Arunita Mukherjee (m. 1995; div. 2005)
- Children: 4
- Relatives: Om Puri (brother-in-law)
- Website: annukapoor.com

Annu Kapoor (born Anil Kapoor; 20 February 1956) (Note: Annu Kapoor's real name was Anil Kapoor, he changed his name to avoid confusion with Anil Kapoor.) is an Indian actor, singer, director, radio disc jockey, and television presenter who has appeared in over a hundred films, as well as television series. His career has spanned over 45 years as an actor, producer, director and singer. Besides acting, he also does a Radio show, named Suhaana Safar With Annu Kapoor which is broadcast on 92.7 Big FM. He has won numerous awards in his career, including two National Film Awards, one Filmfare Award and two Indian Television Academy Awards.

== Early life ==
Annu Kapoor was born Anil Kapoor in Itwara, Bhopal, Bhopal State, on 20 February 1956, to Madanlal, a Punjabi father with roots in Peshawar and Karnal, a Bengali Brahmin mother. His father owned a travelling Parsi theatre company which performed in cities and towns, and his mother was an Urdu teacher and a trained classical singer. His grandfather Kripa Ram Kapoor was a doctor in the British Army and his great grandfather Lala Ganga Ram Kapoor, a revolutionary who was executed during the Indian freedom struggle.

Due to poor financial circumstances, he had to quit school following secondary education. With a salary of ₹ 40, his mother worked as a teacher. On his father's insistence, he joined his theatre company. Following a stint there, he joined National School of Drama in 1976, after his brother Ranjit Kapoor, who was already a student there insisted. After graduating from the National School of Drama and a brief stint with its repertory company, in 1981, he played a 70-year-old man in the play Ek Ruka Hua Faisla in Bombay (now Mumbai). Film director Shyam Benegal who saw Kapoor perform, sent him a letter of appreciation and signed him for his 1983 film, Mandi.

Kapoor's sister Seema Kapoor was briefly married to actor Om Puri. His elder brother, Ranjit, is a director and screenwriter and Seema is a producer and actor. Kapoor's younger brother, Nikhil, is a writer and lyricist.

== Personal life ==
=== Relationships and family ===
Kapoor first married Anupama Patel, an American by birth, in 1992 and they divorced in 1993. Annu then was married to Arunita Mukherjee from 1995 to 2005. He remarried his first wife, Anupama (Pami), in 2008.

Kapoor has four children (three sons - Kavan, Maahir and Evaan - and a daughter, Aradhita) from two marriages.

=== Religion ===
Born into a Hindu family, Kapoor considers himself to be an atheist.

== Career ==
=== Acting ===
He made his screen debut Aadharshila (1982) during his days in Delhi, his debut in the professional film industry in Mumbai was in Mandi (1983) and BETAB Khandar (1984). He got his first breakthrough with Utsav (1984), in which he portrayed the role of Masseur. For which he got his first nomination in the Filmfare Awards in the category of Best Performance in a Comic Role. Subsequently he starred in many critically and commercially acclaimed films like Mr. India (1987), Tezaab (1988), Ram Lakhan (1990), Ghayal (1990), Hum (1991), Darr (1993), Sardar (1993), Om Jai Jagadish (2002), Aitraaz (2004) and 7 Khoon Maaf (2011).

Kapoor began his career as a stage actor in 1979 and was noticed in 1984's Ek Ruka Hua Faisla, directed by Basu Chatterjee and written by elder brother Ranjeet. Annu made his film debut in Mandi, (directed by Shyam Benegal) in 1983. His career has spanned over 30 years, including Bollywood cinema, television serials and game shows. Kapoor is best remembered for hosting the singing show Close-Up Antakshari, produced by Zee TV. He worked in the horror TV serial Kile ka Rahasya (1989) as a cop who was fond of singing.

Kapoor has also appeared in Yamla Pagla Deewana 2. His second big breakthrough came with Vicky Donor (2012), he portrayed the role of Dr. Baldev Chadha. His performance as an obsessive-compulsive sperm-bank physician in this movie met with critical and popular acclaim & was lauded by critics and audiences, for which he won a Filmfare Award, a IIFA Award, a National Film Award, a Screen Award all in the category of Best Supporting Actor. After Vicky Donor, he starred in Yamla Pagla Deewana 2 (2013), Shaukeen (2014), Saat Uchakkey (2016), Jolly LLB 2 (2017), Missing (2018), Dream Girl (2019), Khuda Haafiz (2020) and Suraj Pe Mangal Bhari (2020).

=== Television ===
In 2007, Antakshari – The National Challenge was relaunched on STAR One. The previous year, its "final" episode was telecast; the programme's initial run was from 1993 to 2006. His range of roles varies from portrayal as Saint Kabir in DD National TV serial of the same name, as Mahatma Gandhi in Sardar and Veer Savarkar in Kaala Pani, to police inspector in 7 Khoon Maaf, a petty thief in Utsav to comedic villain in Hum.

The Golden Era – With Annu Kapoor on the Mastiii channel is a nostalgia TV show about Indian cinema, adorned with classical era's Hindi film songs and commentary by Annu Kapoor on unheard tales of Bollywood Cinema's Legends.

Despite films, Annu has been very active in television shows. He is also known for judging and hosting the 90's musical show Antakshari (1993-2005) and Golden Era with Annu Kapoor (2011). He has also appeared in some television series like Param Vir Chakra (1988), Ajnabi (1994), Kabeer (1995), Gubbare (1999) etc.

=== As a radio presenter ===
Currently, he does a radio programme on 92.7 Big FM called "Suhaana Safar with Annu Kapoor on 92.7 Big FM". It's a daily show that features nationally on the radio networks covering all Hindi speaking radio stations across the country. He recreates the magic of the Golden era with unforgettable melodies of that era and untold stories of the stars and films of the Hindi Cinema. The show comes with the tagline "Filmy Duniya Ki Kahi Ankahi Kahaniya".

=== Director ===
Kapoor has directed several plays. He also directed a feature film Abhay (The Fearless), starring Nana Patekar, Moon Sen and Benjamin Gilani) for the Children's Film Society, India. The film won the 1995 National Film Award for Best Children's Film.

=== Producer ===
Kapoor produced a musical talent contest for children (Aao Jhoomein Gaayen for SAB TV) and a Bengali-language musical talent-hunt show, Gaan Gaao Taaka Naao on Rupashi Bangla TV in Kolkata. He also produced a musical in Mathura entitled Ek Sunhari Shyam.

== Filmography ==
=== Directed venture ===
Year	Title	Notes
1994	Abhay - The Fearless	

=== Films ===
Key
†	Denotes films that have not yet been released

Year	Film	Role	Notes
1983	Mandi		
1983	Betaab	Chelaram	
1984	Mashaal	Nagesh	
1984	Khandhar	Anil	
1984	Utsav	Masseur	
1985	Arjun	Babu Ram	
1985	Damul	Sanjeevan	
1986	Ek Ruka Hua Faisla	Juror #9	
1986	Chameli Ki Shaadi	Chhadami Lal	
1987	Susman	Lakshmaya	
1987	Mr. India	Mr. Gaitonde (editor)	
1987	Diljalaa	Fakir Baba	
1988	Khoon Bahaa Ganga Mein		
1988	The Perfect Murder	Tiny man	
1988	Gunahon Ka Faisla	Dinu	
1988	Tezaab	Abbas Ali / Guldasta	
1989	ChaalBaaz	Daya Tribhuvan's servant	
1989	Elaan-E-Jung		
1989	Dost	Forest officer	
1989	Aakhri Gulam		
1989	Main Azaad Hoon	Munna / Azaad	
1989	Rakhwala	Constable Atmaram	
1989	Ram Lakhan	Shiv Charan Mathur	
1990	Ghayal	Drunkard	
1990	Aawaz De Kahan Hai	Hariya (AKA Harry)	
1990	Pyasi Nigahen	Susheel	
1990	Veeru Dada	Ibrahim Gharewali	
1990	Zakhmi Zameen	Madhav	
1991	Hum	Havaldar Arjun Singh	
1991	Vishnu-Devaa	Petty thief	
1991	Yodha	Umeed Singh	
1991	Jamai Raja	Paltu/I.C. Mishra	
1991	Ranbhoomi	Stationmaster	
1992	Paayal	Pardesi	
1992	Jeena Marna Tere Sang		
1992	Muskurahat	Jaggan	
1993	Darr	Vikram "Vicky" Oberoi	
1993	Gardish	Manishbhai Harishbhai	
1993	Waqt Hamara Hai	Cafeteria supervisor	
1993	Dil Ki Baazi	Bihari Daulatram's cook	
1993	Shreemaan Aashique	Masterji (song "Is Se Jyada Dukh Na Koi")	
1994	Sardar	Mohandas Karamchand Gandhi	
1994	Drohkaal	Surinder	
1995	Jawab	Ladle	
1995	Anokha Andaaz	Charlie	
1996	Vijeta	Constable Chamanlal	
1996	Kala Pani	Vinayak Damodar Savarkar	Malayalam Film
1997	Udaan	Anand Lagpade	
1999	Kachche Dhaage		
1999	Arjun Pandit	Dr. Imran	
2000	Tune Mera Dil Le Liyaa	K.K.'s assistant	
2002	Hum Kisise Kum Nahin	Munnu Mobile	
2002	Om Jai Jagadish	KK	
2004	Aitraaz	Barrister Ram Chauthrani	
2004	Raincoat	Landlord	
2004	Kuch To Gadbad Hai	Justice Balwant Khanna	
2008	Mehbooba	Hari Singh / Lal Singh	
2009	The Fakir of Venice (Note: Theatrically released in 2019)	Sattar	
2011	7 Khoon Maaf	Inspector Keemat Lal	
2012	Gali Gali Chor Hai	Constable Parasuram Khuswa	
2012	Vicky Donor	Dr. Baldev Chaddha	
2013	Yamla Pagla Deewana 2	Sir Yograj Khanna	
2014	The Shaukeens	Kamaldheer "KD" Sharma	
2014	Badlapur Boys	Surajbhan Singh	
2014	Muavza	Bechu Bhai	
2014	Kisi Ne Titli Ko Dekha Hai Kya		
2014	Jai Ho Democracy		
2015	Dharam Sankat Mein	Advocate Nawab Mehmood Shah	
2015	Miss Tanakpur Haazir Ho	Sualaal Gandass	
2016	Saat Uchakkey	Bichhi	
2017	Jolly LLB 2	Advocate Pramod Mathur	
2018	Ba Baa Black Sheep	Brian Morris/Santa Claus	
2018	Missing	Inspector Ramkhilawan Buddhu	
2018	Mangal Ho	Giani Zail Singh	
2019	Dream Girl	Jagjit Singh	
2019	Khandaani Shafakhana	Baby's uncle	
2020	Darbaan	Narrator	Released on Zee5
2020	Suraj Pe Mangal Bhari	Shantaram Kaka	
2020	Khuda Haafiz	Usman Hamid Ali Murad	
2021	Chehre	Adv. Paramjeet Singh Bhullar	
2023	Non Stop Dhamaal	Satinder	
2023	Dream Girl 2	Jagjit Singh	
2023	Rules Ranjann		Telugu film
2023	Sab Moh Maaya Hai		
2023	Dry Day	Dauji	
2024	The Signature		
2024	Hamare Baarah	Manzoor Ali Khan Sanjari	
2024	Shaitaan	Nitin Rishi	
2024	Luv Ki Arrange Marriage	Prem, Luv's father	
	[[]]		
2026	Uttar Da Puttar		

=== Television ===
Programme	Notes
Khari-Khari	Rajendra Bhatia
Darpan (two stories)	Basu Chatterji
Pathrai Aankhon Ke Sapne (Tele Film)	Pramod Soni
Phatichar	Dr Quack
Kabir	Anil Chaudry
Satya Ray Presents (one story)	Satyajit Ray
Param Vir Chakra	Chetan Anand
Quile Ka Rahasya	Seema Kapoor
Close Up Antakshari	Gajendra Singh
Chekhov Ki Duniya (one story)	Ranjit Kapoor
Idea Jalsa	By Durga Jasraj
Wheel Smart Shrimati	For Doordarshan
Junoon Kuch Kar Dikhane Ka	Gajendra Singh
Ek Se Badkar Ek	Chota Packet
Bada Dhamaka	Ki Funshala
Golden Era With Annu Kapoor	Mastiii
Itihaas Gavah Hai(Voice Over)	News24
Paurashpur	ALTBalaji
Crash Course	Amazon Prime Video

=== Radio (RJ) ===
Show	Radio Station Name
Suhaana Safar With Annu Kapoor	92.7 Big FM

=== Theatre ===
==== Parsi theatre ====
- Laila Majnu
- Harischandra
- Shirin-Farhad
- Bhakta Prahlad
- Shree Krishna Avtar
- Dahi Wali
- Qatl-e-Tamizan

==== Modern plays ====
- Antim Yatra: Directed by Barry John
- Three Sisters: Written by Anton Chekhov, directed by E. Alkazi
- The Great God Brown by Eugene O'Neill
- The Zoo Story by Edward Albee
- Ek Ruka Hua Faisla

== Awards ==
Year	Award	Category	Nominated work	Result	Ref(s)
1986	Filmfare Awards	Best Performance in a Comic Role	Utsav	Nominated	
1994	V. Shantaram Award	Best Director	Abhay	Won	
1994	National Film Awards	Best Children’s Film	Abhay	Won	
2002	Indian Telly Awards	Best Anchor	Antakshari	Nominated	
2003	Indian Telly Awards	Best Anchor	Antakshari	Nominated	
2003	ITA Awards	Best Anchor	Antakshari	Won (Note: Tied with Nikhil Chinapa)	
2004	ITA Awards	Best Anchor	Antakshari	Won	
2013	Apsara Awards	Best Actor in a Comic Role	Vicky Donor	Won	
2013	IIFA Awards	Best Supporting Actor	Vicky Donor	Won	
2013	IIFA Awards	Best Performance in a Comic Role	Vicky Donor	Nominated	
2013	Filmfare Awards	Best Supporting Actor	Vicky Donor	Won	
2013	National Film Awards	Best Supporting Actor	Vicky Donor	Won	
2013	Screen Awards	Best Comedian	Vicky Donor	Won (Note: Tied with Abhishek Bachchan)	
2013	Times of India Film Awards	Best Supporting Actor	Vicky Donor	Won	
2013	Zee Cine Awards	Best Actor in a Comic Role	Vicky Donor	Nominated	
2014	Stardust Awards	Best Supporting Actor	The Shaukeens	Nominated	
2017	Zee Cine Awards	Best Actor in a Negative Role	Jolly LLB 2	Nominated	
2018	Indian Television Academy Awards	Best Actor in a Web Series	Home	Nominated	
2018	Streaming Awards	Best Actor	Home	Won	
