= Paurashpur =

2020 period drama web series

- Poster
- Genre: Historical drama
- Written by: Baljit Singh Chaddha, Ranveer Pratap Singh, Rajesh Tripathi, Rahul Ranjan, Chital Tripathi
- Directed by: Sachindra Vats, Yogesh Ojha, KayCee
- Country of origin: India
- Original language: Hindi
- No. of seasons: 3
- No. of episodes: 17

Production
- Producer: Sachin Mohite
- Production company: Jaasvand Entertainment

Original release
- Network: ALTBalaji; ZEE5
- Release: 29 December 2020 – 24 May 2024

Paurashpur is an Indian Hindi-language fictional historical period original web series which was streamed on ALTBalaji and ZEE5. The web series is conceptualised by Baljit Singh Chaddha, directed by Sachindra Vats and produced by Sachin Mohite under the production company Jaasvand Entertainment. It stars Annu Kapoor, Milind Soman, Shilpa Shinde and Shaheer Sheikh. The series was released on 29 December 2020. It received a mostly mixed critical reception, with reviewers criticising the show's writing and the excessive use of sexual content.In season 2, this series was released on 28 July 2023 and was directed by Yogesh Ojha and written by Rahul Ranjan. Also in season 3, this series was released on 21 May 2024 as the directed by Kaycee and written by Chital Tripathi and Rajesh Tripathi. Its stars in season 2 and 3 are Sherlyn Chopra, Payel Raha, Muskan Agrawal, and Kajol Tyagi.

== Cast ==
- Annu Kapoor as Bhadrapratap Singh
- Milind Soman as Boris (role of a transgender person)
- Shilpa Shinde as Queen Meerawati
- Shaheer Sheikh as Veer Singh
- Flora Saini as Nayantara
- Aditya Lal as Prince Ranveer
- Anant Joshi as Prince Aditya
- Sahil Salathia as Bhanu
- Poulomi Das as Kala
- Kashish Rai as Kusumlata
- Ashmita Bakshi as Umanglata
- Amit Pachori as Veer Bhanu
- Sherlyn Chopra as Maharani Snehalata
- Payel Raha as Mahamantri Nayanprabha
- Muskaan Agrawal as Dasi Shyam
- Suhana Khan as Champa
- Kajol Tyagi as Rani Chandrika
- Amit Bhandari as Jyotish Acharya
- Sanjeev Jain as Vaidhya
- Somit Jain as Senapati
- Ravi Maan as King Aditya
- Anubhav Krishna Srivasta as Kumar Yashodhan

== Episodes ==
Series	Episodes	Originally released		
Series	Episodes	First released	Last released	Network
1	7	29 December 2020	30 December 2020	ALTBalaji and ZEE5
2	5	28 July 2023	26 December 2023	ALTT
3	5	21 May 2024	24 May 2024	ALTT

=== Season 1 ===
No. overall	No. in season	Title	Directed by	Written by	Original release date
1	1	"Paurashpur – Kingdom of Patriarchy"	Sachindra Vats	Baljit Singh Chaddha, Singh Ranveer Pratap and Rajesh Tripathi	29 December 2020
The sixth wedding celebration of King Bhadrapratap, but it's overshadowed by dark events. New queen Umanglata is warned of danger by Boris, and the king's villainous advisor, Chandrasen, injures her handmaiden, Rukma. To complicate matters further, an intruder appears, leading to the queen's kidnapping and setting up the main plotline for the season.
2	2	"Nakaabposh – The Mysterious Kidnapper"	Sachindra Vats	Baljit Singh Chaddha, Singh Ranveer Pratap and Rajesh Tripathi	30 December 2020
The Naqabposh slays several guards during the abduction, challenging the authority of the tyrannical King Bhadrapratap Singh. King Bhadrapratap's first wife, Queen Meerawati, observes the escalating chaos and, in a strategic move to maintain her influence, approaches her favorite handmaiden, Kala, with an offer to become the king's next queen. Meanwhile, Boris, a defiant figure living outside the city who questions the kingdom's rigid gender norms, continues to be a disruptive presence, further complicating the political landscape of Paurashpur.
3	3	"Kala Ranveer - Not A Love Story"	Sachindra Vats	Baljit Singh Chaddha, Singh Ranveer Pratap and Rajesh Tripathi	30 December 2020
Kala is sentenced to death after being caught with Prince Ranveer. However, she is saved from execution at the last moment. Concurrently, Prince Ranveer searches for Kala among corpses but finds someone else. In a separate storyline, Bhanu intervenes to stop Prince Aaditya from killing King Bhadrapratap.
4	4	"Boris – The Gender Politics"	Sachindra Vats	Baljit Singh Chaddha, Singh Ranveer Pratap and Rajesh Tripathi	30 December 2020
Kala is caught with Prince Ranveer and subsequently sentenced to death. As she is about to be executed, she is dramatically saved, though the exact method of her salvation. Prince Ranveer searches among corpses for Kala but ends up finding someone else, adding mystery to her fate. A confrontation occurs where Bhanu stops Prince Aaditya from killing King Bhadrapratap, highlighting the ongoing political tensions and power struggles within the kingdom.
5	5	"Ujale Baaz – The Secret Hawk"	Sachindra Vats	Baljit Singh Chaddha, Singh Ranveer Pratap and Rajesh Tripathi	30 December 2020
Boris attempts to humiliate the tyrannical King Bhadrapratap, but his plan backfires, and the king insults Boris instead. Kala wakes up at Boris's location after being saved from execution. Her immediate goal is to escape and reunite with Prince Ranveer. Queen Meerawati, in a shocking turn of events, slits Bhanu's throat. rince Ranveer secretly returns to the castle, hidden inside a trunk. Once back, he reveals important information, adding a new layer of intrigue to the unfolding palace politics.
6	6	"Nayantara – Legend of the Missing Queen"	Sachindra Vats	Baljit Singh Chaddha, Singh Ranveer Pratap and Rajesh Tripathi	30 December 2020
Prince Aaditya is deeply saddened by the death of Bhanu, who was killed by Meerawati. King Bhadrapratap learns that Meerawati has been preserving the corpse of the missing Queen Nayantara and, in a fit of rage, decides to have Meerawati burned alive. News of Meerawati's imminent execution reaches Boris's haven, prompting the former queens living there to band together and launch a mission to save her. Boris and his army attack Paurashpur to rescue Meerawati. However, when Boris discovers that Meerawati was responsible for Bhanu's death, he is filled with a desire for vengeance. His attempt to avenge Bhanu fails when he is stabbed in the back, leaving his mission in jeopardy.
7	7	"Vidroh – The Uprising"	Sachindra Vats	Baljit Singh Chaddha, Singh Ranveer Pratap and Rajesh Tripathi	30 December 2020
Boris learns that Queen Meeravati is responsible for Bhanu's death and decides to avenge him. His attempt to seek justice for Bhanu fails when he is betrayed and stabbed in the back. Kala wakes up at Boris's place and attempts to escape to reunite with Ranveer. Queen Meeravati's action slits Bhanu's throat. Ranveer manages to return to the castle by hiding in a trunk and subsequently reveals important information.

=== Season 2 ===
No. overall	No. in season	Title	Directed by	Written by	Original release date
8	1	"Thrones and Deceit"	Yogesh Ojha	Rahul Ranjan	28 July 2023
The treacherous nature of Paurashpur, where rulers and rebels collide in a game of power and survival. A significant element introduced is the mystery surrounding which queen is pregnant, a development that creates much intrigue and potential conflict within the royal household. Prophecies hint at future chaos, adding a layer of suspense and a sense that hidden betrayals are set to emerge and potentially shatter the kingdom's fragile stability.
9	2	"Love's Battle"	Yogesh Ojha	Rahul Ranjan	26 December 2023
The power struggles and intense competition among the queens for the throne, set against a backdrop of secrets and palace intrigue that builds the season's captivating narrative. The ongoing battle between genders for equality within Paurashpur also continues to be a prominent theme as Raja Vichitrasen's significant announcement. This declaration shakes the kingdom and ultimately reveals the identity of the chosen Maharani.
10	3	"Secrets and Shadows"	Yogesh Ojha	Rahul Ranjan	26 December 2023
Various characters navigate a complex web of lies in a web of deceit as they vie for influence and survival within the kingdom. Snehlata, among others, is determined to protect the throne and her daughter's future, while key figures like Mahamantri Nayanprabha and Senapati Agnivardhan actively plot their next moves to secure their own power. The themes of secrets and betrayal, building a captivating narrative as the queens and other major players compete for the supreme monarch's position.
11	4	"The Prophecy Unveiled"	Yogesh Ojha	Rahul Ranjan	26 December 2023
The episode delves deeper into the clash of prophecy, power, and love that defines the fantastical kingdom. Following the aftermath of the deaths of Rukma Dai and Rani Vishaka in the previous episode, an atmosphere of doubt and suspicion envelops the palace, and this installment serves to unravel some of the mysteries that have been building. The events of the episode build towards the final resolution of the conflict over the throne, as past events are linked to the present struggle for the supreme monarch's position.
12	5	"The Dance of Power"	Yogesh Ojha	Rahul Ranjan	26 December 2023
The episode explores the fierce competition among the queens for power, with secrets, deceptions, and betrayals coming to light as the true identity of the supreme monarch approaches resolution. The characters are immersed in navigating a complex web of deceit and hidden enemies, as they plot their respective moves to secure their position and future within the kingdom's hierarchy. The underlying theme of the season's battle of the sexes and the struggle for gender equality continues to be a central part of the episode's conclusion.

=== Season 3 ===
No. overall	No. in season	Title	Directed by	Written by	Original release date
13	1	"The Rise Of Conspiracy"	KayCee	Chital Tripathi, Rajesh Tripathi	21 May 2024
Queen Snehlata is determined to protect her daughter's future and the throne by navigating a treacherous landscape of deceit, with the plot focusing on the political scheming of Mahamantri Nayanprabha and Senapati Agnivardhan.
14	2	"The Murder of Sentiments"	KayCee	Chital Tripathi, Rajesh Tripathi	21 May 2024
The narrative delves into secrets and deceptions, as various characters plot their moves in the treacherous court environment. Queens and key players, such as Maharani Snehalata and Mahamantri Nayanprabha, compete for power, navigating a web of alliances and hidden enemies. Overarching theme of the battle of the sexes and the fight against the kingdom's oppressive, patriarchal system, as women and marginalized groups strive for liberation.
15	3	"Destiny Strikes a New"	KayCee	Chital Tripathi, Rajesh Tripathi	24 May 2024
Mahamantri Nayanprabha and Senapati Agnivardhan begin plotting their moves against the current power structure. The broader narrative of Season 3 heavily emphasizes the powerful and protective love between Maharani Snehlata and her daughter, Chandrika, which drives many of the season's events. Snehlata faces the challenge of navigating a web of hidden enemies while remaining determined to secure her family's legacy. Snehlata's efforts to protect the throne and her daughter's future amidst a brewing storm of deceit and political maneuvering.
16	4	"Echoes of the Past Dusane, Prajakta"	KayCee	Chital Tripathi, Rajesh Tripathi	24 May 2024
The episode works to unravel some of the past and present mysteries of Paurashpur, bringing the characters closer to the thrilling conclusion of their search for the true monarch. The central theme of women fighting for their place and power in a male-dominated kingdom continues, with strong female characters driving the main storyline. Characters are deeply involved in strategic plotting, with hidden enemies and alliances shifting frequently.
17	5	"Together or Apart?"	KayCee	Chital Tripathi, Rajesh Tripathi	24 May 2024
The episode focuses heavily on the emotional and dramatic reunion of Atishi and Bhaumika (both roles played by Sherlyn Chopra), exploring whether they can unite their efforts or if circumstances will keep them divided despite their bond. As is consistent with the season's overall storyline, the episode continues to build a captivating narrative of secrets, deception, and betrayal as various queens and powerful figures compete for the throne and ultimate power within Paurashpur. The characters actions are driven by an overarching clash of prophecy, power, and love, with the episode moving the plot closer to the final conclusion of who will become the supreme monarch. The narrative intensifies as fate intervenes to bring the two estranged sisters, Atishi and Bhaumika, face to face. Bound by the love of their mother, Maharani Snehlata, they are forced to confront their past and a shared future that ties them to the kingdom's destiny.

== Release and marketing ==
On 15 October 2020, ALTBalaji announced about the web series and it has released on 29 December 2020. The web series logo was launched on 2 December 2020 on ALTBalaji's official Instagram profile with 16 different Indian languages. Teaser was launched on 6 December 2020.

== Critical reception ==
Archika Khurana of The Times of India has given 2/5 stars stating that the plot unfolds to draw out the state of women in society and addresses some significant issues like patriarchy, gender politics and power. However, it ends up being a tedious watch due to its weak endeavour. Directed by Shachindra Vats, this seven-part series bought together many ingredients—good setup, great casting, and strong background score— but the final dish turns out to be not-so-inviting.

Anvita Singh of The Indian Express criticise that "The script is abysmal, and the dialogues are just plain bad. It is a groundbreaking epic drama about lust, revenge and patriarchy. However, it comes across as soft porn. There are unnecessary sex scenes, which, by the way, have not been shot aesthetically."

Dyuti Gupta or SheThePeople.TV criticised that "This Ekta Kapoor Series Is Just Glitter, No Gold". The plot had ample potential to turn out to be a Bahubali-sized blockbuster, but a below-average script added with an equally poor direction makes it something you'd be better off skipping. There are so many loopholes and loose ends that the entire show feels like a half-hearted effort on part of the makers. The CGI and VFX are lousy, the screenplay is preposterous and the dialogues are downright cringeworthy.

Ravi Bule of ABP News Live criticise that the web series with Gender Discrimination Raises Cheaply Series and rather focuses on Kama Sutra like content.

TV9 Hindi criticise that Story has been focused on bold scenes, no character could leave impression.
