= Parth Samthaan =

Indian actor (born 1991)

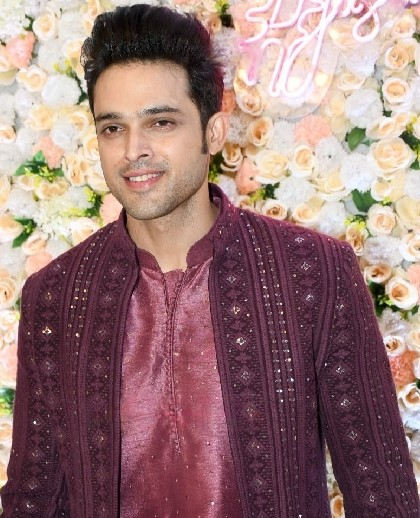
- Parth in 2023
- Born: Parth Laghate; 11 March 1991 (age 35); Mumbai, Maharashtra, India
- Occupation: Actor
- Years active: 2012—present
- Known for: Kaisi Yeh Yaariaan; Kasautii Zindagii Kay; Seher – Hone Ko Hai

Parth Laghate (born 11 March 1991) known professionally as Parth Samthaan is an Indian actor. He began his acting career by starring in Gumrah: End of Innocence as Siddharth and Best Friends Forever? as Prithvi Sanyal in the same year. He rose to fame after portraying Manik Malhotra in Kaisi Yeh Yaariaan, Anurag Basu in Kasautii Zindagii Kay and Mahid Niyazi in Seher – Hone Ko Hai.

== Career ==
Samthaan started off his acting career by featuring in episodics like Life OK's Savdhaan India, MTV India's Webbed, Bindass's Yeh Hai Aashiqui and Zing's Pyaar Tune Kya Kiya.

In 2012, he portrayed Prithvi Sanyal in Channel V's Best Friends Forever?. Samthaan rose to fame by playing Manik Malhotra from 2014 to 2015 in MTV India's Kaisi Yeh Yaariaan opposite Niti Taylor for seasons 1 and 2.

Samthaan signed his first Bollywood debut, Googly Ho Gayi in 2016. He also attempted playback singing for his second song Jind Meri. In 2018, he returned to play Manik Malhotra in Voot's Kaisi Yeh Yaariaan 3.

From 2018 to 2020, Samthaan portrayed Anurag Basu opposite Erica Fernandes in Star Plus's Kasautii Zindagii Kay for which he won the Indian Telly Award for Best Jodi Popular and Kalakar Award for Best Actor Popular.

In 2019, he played Faizal Alghazi in ALT Balaji's Kehne Ko Humsafar Hain 2 opposite Pooja Banerjee.

In 2020, he was seen in ALT Balaji's web-series Mai Hero Boll Raha Hu.

In 2022, he returned to play Manik Malhotra in Voot's Kaisi Yeh Yaariaan 4 and 5

Samthaan made his Bollywood debut with the film Ghudchadi.

In April 2025, Samthaan became a part of the crime thriller show CID playing the character of ACP Ayushman. He initially rejected the role after being offered because of his unreadiness to take such a big role. Additionally, Samthaan admitted feeling 'awkward' around senior actors like Dayanand Shetty and Aditya Shrivastava, who have been a part of the show for long. From December 2025 to November 2026, Samthaan portrayed Mahid Niyazi in Colors TV's Seher – Hone Ko Hai.

== Media ==
In 2015, Samthaan was placed 11th in Eastern Eye's Top 50 Sexiest Asian Men List.

He was ranked 3rd in Times of India's 25 "Most Desirable Men on Television" List, 2018. In 2019, he was listed 2nd on the same list and maintained his position at 2nd rank in 2020 as well.

He was also ranked in The Times Most Desirable Men at No. 22 in 2019, at No. 20 in 2020.

== Filmography ==
=== Films ===
Year	Title	Role	Ref.
2024	Hamare Baarah	Danish	
2024	Ghudchadi	Chirag Sharma	

=== Television ===
Year	Title	Role	Notes	Ref.
2012	Gumrah: End of Innocence	Siddharth		
2012	Best Friends Forever?	Prithvi Sanyal		
2013	Savdhaan India	Vishal Bhatt		
2013	Yeh Hai Aashiqui	Parth	Season 1	
2014–2015	Kaisi Yeh Yaariaan	Manik Malhotra	Seasons 1, 2	
2014	Pyaar Tune Kya Kiya	Gaurav		
2015	Pyaar Tune Kya Kiya	Host	Season 4, 5	
2018	MTV Ace of Space 1	Himself	Guest appearance	
2018–2020	Kasautii Zindagii Kay	Anurag Basu		
2019	Kitchen Champion	Himself	Guest appearance	
2019	Box Cricket League	Contestant		
2019	Khatra Khatra Khatra	Himself	Guest appearance	
2025	CID 2	A.C.P. Ayushmaan		
2025–2026	Seher – Hone Ko Hai	Mahid Niyazi		

=== Web series ===
Year	Title	Role	Notes	Ref.
2018–2023	Kaisi Yeh Yaariaan	Manik Malhotra	Seasons 3-4-5	
2019	Kehne Ko Humsafar Hain 2	Faizal Alghazi		
2020	Mai Hero Boll Raha Hu	Nawab "Hero"		
2023	Social Currency	Contestant		

=== Music videos ===
Year	Title	Singer(s)	Ref.
2016	Jind Meri Royi Royi	Himself	
2017	Tu Jo Kahe	Yasser Desai	
2018	Fans Nahi Friends	Palash Muchhal	
2018	Nishaa	Yasser Desai	
2019	Aakhri Baar	Palash Muchhal	
2021	Pehle Pyaar Ka Pehle Gham	Tulsi Kumar, Jubin Nautiyal	
2021	Rim Jhim	Jubin Nautiyal	
2021	Jeena Bhool Jaunga	Raj Barman	
2021	Dua Kijiye	Raj Barman	
2021	Insaaf	Suraj Chauhan	
2022	Sabki Baaratein Aayi	Seepi Jha, Dev Negi	
2022	Mere Haniyaa	Bhuvan Ahuja, Arko	
2022	Single Saiyaan	Sukriti Kakar, Prakriti Kakar	
2022	Dhokha	Arijit Singh	
2022	Dholna	Deedar Kaur	
2022	Honthon Pe Bas	Seepi Jha, Sameer Khan	
2023	Baarish Ke Aane Se	Shreya Ghoshal, Tony Kakkar	
2024	Jiya Laage Na	Shilpa Rao, Mohit Chauhan	
2025	Rootha Mera Ishq	Yasser Desai, Amol Shrivastava, Abhishek Talented	

== Awards and nominations ==
=== Television awards ===
Year	Award	Category	Work	Result	Ref.
2015	Asian Viewers Television Awards	Male Actor Of The Year	Kaisi Yeh Yaariyan	Nominated	
2019	Indian Telly Awards	Fan Favorite Actor	Kasautii Zindagii Kay	Nominated	
2019	Indian Telly Awards	Fan Favorite Jodi	Kasautii Zindagii Kay	Won	
2019	Gold Awards	Best Actor Male	Kasautii Zindagii Kay	Nominated	
2019	Gold Awards	Best Onscreen Jodi	Kasautii Zindagii Kay	Nominated	
2019	Asian Viewers Television Awards	Male Actor Of The Year	Kasautii Zindagii Kay	Nominated	

=== Other awards ===
Year	Award	Category	Result	Ref.
2023	Bollywood Hungama Style Icons	Most Stylish TV Actor Male	Nominated	
2024	Bollywood Hungama Style Icons	Most Stylish TV Actor Male	Nominated	
