= Kasautii Zindagii Kay (2018 TV series) =

Indian Hindi-language romantic drama series

- Genre: Drama
- Created by: Ekta Kapoor
- Screenplay by: Anil Nagpal; Mrinal Tripathi
- Story by: Anil Nagpal
- Directed by: Muzammil Desai
- Creative directors: Richa Ambolkar; Shivangi Babbar
- Starring: Erica Fernandes; Parth Samthaan; Hina Khan; Karan Singh Grover; Aamna Sharif; Karan Patel; Namik Paul
- Opening theme: Babul Supriyo; Priya Bhattacharya
- Country of origin: India
- Original language: Hindi
- No. of seasons: 2
- No. of episodes: 468

Production
- Executive producers: Nilesh Mishra; Ranjan Jenaa
- Producers: Ekta Kapoor; Shobha Kapoor
- Cinematography: Deepak Malvankar
- Editors: Vikas Sharma; Vishal Sharma; Sandeep Bhatt
- Camera setup: Multi-camera
- Running time: 22 minutes
- Production company: Balaji Telefilms

Original release
- Network: StarPlus
- Release: 25 September 2018 – 3 October 2020

Related
- Kasautii Zindagii Kay

Kasautii Zindagii Kay (transl. The Trials of Life) is an Indian romantic drama television series produced by Ekta Kapoor under her banner Balaji Telefilms. It was a reboot of Kapoor's 2001 soap opera with the same name. It aired from 25 September 2018 to 3 October 2020 on Star Plus. The series starred Parth Samthaan, Erica Fernandes, Hina Khan, Karan Singh Grover, Aamna Sharif and Karan Patel.

== Plot ==
Anurag Basu and Prerna Sharma are twin flames made for each other, yet forced to overcome obstacles to be together.

Set in Kolkata, the story focuses on Anurag and Prerna who study in the same university. Fate keeps pulling them towards each other and as they get to know one another, they slowly form a bond of trust, understanding and friendship. Their fathers are good friends. Anurag's mother, Mohini wants a daughter-in-law who can match the status and wealth of the Basu family and is disappointed to see Anurag and Prerna's closeness. Naveen, an evil man blackmails Prerna to marry him. Anurag senses something is not right so he decides to reveal Naveen's hidden colours and save Prerna's life. Naveen is exposed and arrested. In between all these incidents, Prerna and Anurag fall in love with each other.

Anurag and Prerna confess their feelings to one another, consummate their relationship, and plan to marry. Meanwhile, Komolika, a selfish and evil woman becomes obsessed with Anurag. Komolika plots to create misunderstandings between Anurag and Prerna. She even causes the accident of Anurag's father Moloy and Prerna's father Rajesh, who had discovered her true intentions. Moloy becomes comatose and Rajesh dies. Komolika further asks Anurag to marry her in order to save Prerna's house. Compelled and helpless, Anurag agrees and this makes Mohini happy. Unaware of the truth, Prerna is left shocked. Later she discovers that she is pregnant.

Hurt and rebellious, Prerna enters the Basu house, successfully exposes Komolika and gets her arrested. Komolika escapes prison and returns to kill Prerna, but falls down the terrace and goes missing. Anurag and Prerna happily reunite and get engaged.

Rishabh Bajaj is a successful, powerful and selfish businessman. He falsely frames Anurag and gets him jailed. Further, he asks Prerna to marry him in exchange for Anurag's freedom. Helpless, she agrees. Heartbroken, Anurag questions Prerna. She lies to him, hoping he moves on but Anurag remains adamant and refuses to give up on their love. Mr. Bajaj married Prerna so that his daughter Kukki can have a mother figure in her life. However, Rishabh starts falling for Prerna. Aware of the fact that Prerna loves Anurag, Rishabh tries to kill him. When his daughter Kukki ends up getting hurt while trying to stop Rishabh, he steps back. Anurag and Prerna reunite again.

Vengeful, Komolika makes a comeback. Prerna reveals her pregnancy to Anurag and the two rejoice as they get ready to marry. Komolika causes Anurag's accident and everyone believes he is dead.

Anurag loses his memory. Komolika undergoes plastic surgery and fakes an identity of being Sonalika, misusing the opportunity to make Anurag and the Basus believe that they got married. Anurag does not remember his time with Prerna. Prerna discovers Komolika's identity and decides to expose her but refrains in fear of affecting Anurag's memory and health. Komolika tries to kill Prerna and her child multiple times but fails to do so.

Prerna is all set to marry Viraj but when he realises she still loves Anurag, he kidnaps her and tries to forcefully marry her and in a pursuit to rescue Prerna, Anurag regains his lost memory. Prerna pushes viraj off the cliff to stop him from shooting Anurag and as he falls to his death he shoots prerna which triggers her delivery. Later on Prerna gives birth to Sneha and reconciles with Anurag. Komolika threatens Anurag to frame Prerna for Viraj's murder. She asks Anurag to pretend to push Prerna off the bridge or Prerna would have a life long jail. Rishabh, who still has feelings for Prerna, recommends Anurag to follow the plan, hoping to keep the two away. Helpless, Anurag agrees and asks Rishabh to promise to save Prerna.

Komolika then abandons Sneha in an orphanage and bribes a worker to burn it. Prerna reaches the orphanage and assumes Sneha to be dead. Broken beyond belief, Prerna moves to London with Rishabh.

Eight years later, Prerna thrives as a successful businesswoman in London while Anurag's business does well in Kolkata. Prerna maintains a formal relation with Rishabh, and still detesting Anurag for his betrayal. Anurag hates Komolika and lives in constant guilt. Prerna leaves for Kolkata once again to seek revenge from Anurag for betraying her and also for her daughter's death. Prerna promises to ruin Anurag, not knowing the fact that he is innocent. Anurag and Prerna meet an orphan, and feel a powerful connection to her, unaware that she is Sneha, who has survived the fire.

When Anurag learns the truth about her daughter Sneha, he breaks ties with Komolika, reveals the truth to Prerna and shows her the proof. The two reunite after a long wait.

Enraged after seeing Anurag and Prerna together, Komolika tries to stab Prerna but when Rishabh comes in between to save Prerna, he is stabbed. Rishabh stabs Komolika in return, and she finally dies. Before dying, Rishabh apologizes to Prerna and Anurag for being selfish and separating them and asks them to take care of Kukki.

Anurag and Prerna live a happy life, with their daughter Sneha, in Kolkata and get married.

== Cast ==
=== Main ===
- Parth Samthaan as Anurag Basu: Mohini and Moloy's son; Rakhi, Nivedita and Tapur's brother; Komolika's ex husband; Prerna's husband; Sneha's father; Diya's adoptive father (2018-2020)
- Erica Fernandes as Prerna Sharma Basu: Veena and Rajesh's elder daughter; Shekhar, Shivani and Mahesh's sister; Rishabh's ex wife; Anurag's wife; Sneha's mother (2018-2020)
- Karan Singh Grover / Karan Patel as Rishabh Bajaj: Prerna's ex husband; Kukki's father (2019–2020) / (2020)
- Hina Khan / Aamna Sharif as Komolika Chaubey: Siddhant's daughter; Mishka and Ronit's sister; Anurag's ex wife; Diya's adoptive mother (2018-2019) / (2019–2020)

=== Recurring ===
==== Basus ====
- Uday Tikekar as Moloy Basu: Mohini's husband; Rakhi, Nivedita, Anurag and Tapur's father; Tanisha, Kaushik and Sneha's grandfather; Diya's adoptive grandfather (2018-2020)
- Shubhaavi Choksey as Mohini Basu: Moloy's wife; Rakhi, Nivedita, Anurag and Tapur's mother; Tanisha, Kaushik and Sneha's grandmother; Diya's adoptive grandmother (2018-2020)
- Parull Chaudhry as Rakhi Basu Chakraborty: Mohini and Moloy's eldest daughter; Nivedita, Anurag and Tapur's sister; Tanisha and Kaushik's mother (2020)
- Urfi Javed as Tanisha Chakraborty: Rakhi's daughter; Kaushik's sister (2020)
- Kunal Thakur / Akash Jagga as Kaushik Chakraborty: Rakhi's son; Tanisha's brother; Kukki's boyfriend (2020)
- Pooja Banerjee as Nivedita Basu Sengupta: Mohini and Moloy's daughter; Rakhi, Anurag and Tapur's sister; Anupam's wife (2018–2020)
- Sahil Anand as Anupam Sengupta: Nivedita's husband (2018–2020)
- Sumaiya Khan / Tasheen Shah as Sneha Basu: Prerna and Anurag's daughter (2020)
- Shivika Rishi / Arishta Mehta as Diya: Anurag and Komolika's adoptive daughter (2020)
- Upasana Salunke / Priyal Mahajan / Aastha Abhay / Garima Parihar as Tapur Basu: Mohini and Moloy's youngest daughter; Rakhi, Nivedita and Anurag's sister (2018–2020)
- Shahrukh Sadri as Prosenjit Basu: Moloy's brother; Kumud's husband; Mouli's father (2019)
- Anjali Gupta as Kumud Basu: Prosenjit's wife; Mouli's mother (2019)
- Coral Bhamra as Mouli Basu: Kumud and Prosenjit's daughter (2019)

==== Sharmas ====
- Kali Prasad Mukherjee as Rajesh Sharma: Veena's husband; Shekhar, Prerna, Shivani and Mahesh's father (2018-2019)
- Kanupriya Pandit as Veena Sharma: Rajesh's wife; Shekhar, Prerna, Shivani and Mahesh's mother; Sneha's grandmother (2018-2020)
- Karan Arora as Shekhar Sharma: Rajesh and Veena's elder son; Prerna, Shivani and Mahesh's brother; Suman's husband (2018-2020)
- Antara Banerjee / Ritu Chauhan as Suman Sharma: Shekhar's wife (2018–2019) / (2019–2020)
- Charvi Saraf as Shivani Sharma: Veena and Rajesh's younger daughter; Shekhar, Prerna and Mahesh's sister; Ronit's ex- girlfriend (2018–2020)
- Mridul Das as Mahesh Sharma: Veena and Rajesh's younger son; Shekhar, Prerna and Shivani's brother; Kajal's husband (2020)
  - Karan Bhanushali as Young Mahesh Sharma (2018–2020)
- Minal Mogam as Kajal Sharma: Mahesh's wife (2020)

==== Chaubeys ====
- Adi Irani as Siddhant Chaubey: A politician and Komolika, Mishka, and Ronit's father(2018–2019)
- Ariah Aggarwal as Mishka Chaubey: Siddhant's younger daughter; Komolika and Ronit's sister (2018–2019)
- Tarun Mahilani as Ronit Chaubey: Siddhant's son; Komolika and Mishka's brother; Shivani's ex-boyfriend(2018–2020)

==== Bajajs ====
- Alka Amin as Sharda Bajaj: Rishabh's Aunt, Tanvi's adoptive mother (2019)
- Sonyaa Ayoddhya as Tanvi Bajaj: Sharda's adoptive daughter (2019)
- Aditi Sanwal as Kukki Bajaj: Menaka and Rishabh's daughter; Kaushik's girlfriend (2020)
  - Jia Narigara as Child Kukki Bajaj (2019)

==== Chattopadhyays ====
- Sanjay Swaraj as Naveen Chandra Chattopadhyay: Mohini's adoptive brother; Madhuri and Ronita's husband (2018–2019)
- Madhura Naik as Madhuri Chattopadhyay: Naveen's first wife (2018)
- Piyali Munshi as Ronita Chattopadhyay: Naveen's second wife (2018)

==== Others ====
- Siddharth Banerjee / Naman Arora as Siddharth "Sid" Kapoor: Anurag's best friend (2018,2020)
- Anju Jadhav / Michelle Shah as Anjali Pathak: Prerna's best friend (2018)
- Monica Sharma as Kirti Sharma: Prerna and Anjali's friend; Rohan's wife (2018)
- Naveen Sharma as Rohan Sharma: Anurag and Prerna's friend; Kirti's husband (2018)
- Roopali Prakash as Manisha Singhania: Komolika's friend (2018)
- Rohit Sharma as Gaurav: Komolika's ex-boyfriend (2018)
- Bhavya Sachdeva as Sahil Sinha: Vikrant's brother, Tapur's fiancé (2019)
- Siddharth Shivpuri as Vikrant Sinha: Sahil's brother (2019)
- Kunal Madhiwalla as Rahil Das: Manager of Basu Industries (2019- 2020)
- Neelu Dogra as Rondita Bhasin: Mohini's friend (2020)
- Reema Vohra as Priyanka Gupta: Sneha's caretaker (2020)
- Amit Raghuvanshi / Aashish Bhardhwaj as Monish: Kaushik's cousin (2020)
- Saurabbh Ravi Dutta as News Reporter (2020)
- Namik Paul as Viraj Bhardwaj: Prerna's ex fiancé (2020)
- Sabina Jat as Anushka Thapar: Kukki's friend (2020)

=== Guests ===
- Sidharth Malhotra as Abhay Singh: To promote Jabariya Jodi (2019)
- Parineeti Chopra as Babli Yadav: To promote Jabariya Jodi (2019)
- Vikram Singh Chauhan as Aman Junaid Khan: To promote Yehh Jadu Hai Jinn Ka! (2019)
- Aditi Sharma as Roshni Ahmad: To promote Yehh Jadu Hai Jinn Ka! (2019)
- Ayushmann Khurrana as Karamveer Singh: To promote Dream Girl (2019)
- Nushrat Bharucha as Mahi Rajput: To promote Dream Girl (2019)
- Rupali Ganguly as Anupamaa Shah: To promote Anupamaa (2020)
- Sudhanshu Pandey as Vanraj Shah: To promote Anupamaa (2020)
- Paras Kalnawat as Samar Shah: To promote Anupamaa (2020)
- Muskan Bamne as Pakhi Shah: To promote Anupamaa (2020)
- Lankesh Bhardwaj as Inspector and Advocate

== Production ==
=== Development ===
Kasautii Zindagii Kay is a reboot of the 2001 series of the same name, which was also produced by Ekta Kapoor under Balaji Telefilms for Star Plus.

In February 2018, Ekta Kapoor revealed that she was creating a rebooted version of one of her old series stating:

With a piece of my broken heart I wrote in 2001, 17 years later I reboot it dipping in personal pain and lacing it with experiences of an older me! Bringing back my most successful love saga that ran for 9 years! Again, I’ll take my broken heart & make it into art!

— Ekta Kapoor

On 4 July 2018, Kapoor had a meeting with Star Plus regarding the reboot. On 21 July 2018, she announced the Kasautii Zindagii Kay reboot by sharing the teaser of the series.

In September 2018, Shah Rukh Khan introduced Parth Samthaan and Erica Fernandes as Anurag Basu and Prerna Sharma in the first promo of the series.

Kapoor revealed that the character Anurag was named after her director friend and the character Prerna was named after her father's friend Prem Chopra's daughter.

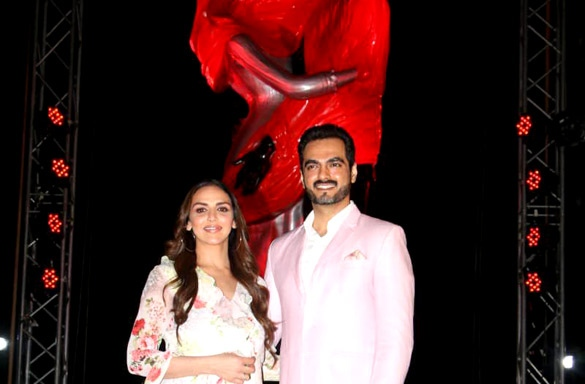
Esha Deol and Bharat Takhtani unveiled one of the sculpture depicting Kasautii Zindagii Kay's lead characters Anurag and Prerna in Mumbai on 10 September 2018.

In September 2018, twenty five feet statues of the lead characters Anurag and Prerna were unveiled across ten cities in India by popular actors to promote the series.

The storyline took an eight years leap in February 2020.

=== Casting ===
Erica Fernandes was cast to portray Prerna Sharma. Later, Parth Samthaan was confirmed to play Anurag Basu.

I had a few personality traits in mind for Anurag and Prerna. Anurag had to be the kind of man who doesn't scream to get noticed, but once you notice him, he's unforgettable. For me, Parth was an obvious choice because he has unbelievable eyes. I have not seen a man whose eyes reflect that depth even in photographs. Prerna is someone who comes across as light-hearted, but has a lot of depth. When I saw the promo of Erica's show, Kuch Rang Pyar Ke Aise Bhi, I knew I wanted to cast her.

— Ekta Kapoor

Uday Tikekar, Shubhaavi Choksey, Kali Prasad Mukherjee, Kanupriya Pandit, Pooja Banerjee and Sahil Anand were cast to play prominent roles of Moloy Basu, Mohini Basu, Rajesh Sharma, Veena Sharma, Nivedita Basu and Anupam Sengupta.

In October 2018, Hina Khan was introduced as Komolika Chaubey. In June 2019, Karan Singh Grover was introduced as Rishabh Bajaj. Initially, Upasana Salunke played Tapur Basu but was soon replaced by Priyal Mahajan, who was again replaced by Aastha Abhay in April 2019 and yet again replaced by Garima Parihar in March 2020.

In May 2019, Hina Khan took a break from the series. However, in September 2019, Khan confirmed quiting the show and was replaced by Aamna Sharif as Komolika Chaubey in October 2019.

Namik Paul was supposed to enter the series in April 2019 as Vikrant Sinha. However, he chose the lead role in Kavach: Maha Shivratri over Kasautii. Siddharth Shivpuri was then cast to play Vikrant.

In January 2020, Paul finally joined the cast, this time as Viraj Bhardwaj. In March 2020, Karan Singh Grover returned to play Rishabh Bajaj after his break. Post his return, the series took an eight-year leap. Various new additions were introduced including Parull Chaudhry, Kunal Thakur, Urfi Javed, Sumaiya Khan, Mridul Das and Minal Mogam.

In June 2020, when filming was about to resume post the halt owing to the coronavirus pandemic, it was confirmed that Grover will not be returning. On 25 June 2020, Karan Patel was confirmed to be replacing Grover as Rishabh Bajaj. Soon after, Sumaiya Khan was replaced by Tasheen Shah as Sneha Basu. Kunal Thakur, also decided to not return to shoot owing to the pandemic and was replaced by Akash Jagga as Kaushik Basu. Sahil Anand, who played Anupam Sengupta also confirmed not returning post the outbreak. But he decided to return in September 2020 to wrap up the series, which went off air on 3 October 2020.

=== Filming ===
Kasautii was mainly filmed in Mumbai in Killick Nixon Studio but certain scenes were shot in Kolkata as the show's storyline was based in West Bengal.

The promo which featured Shah Rukh Khan introducing Parth Samthaan and Erica Fernandes as Anurag and Prerna was shot at Mumbai's Kelve Railway Station.

Parth Samthaan, Erica Fernandes, Karan Singh Grover, Pooja Banerjee, Sahil Anand and Tarun Mahilani flew to Zürich in June 2019 to shoot the Switzerland track.

On 12 July 2020, Parth Samthaan was tested positive for coronavirus and the shooting of the series was halted. The shooting was resumed on 17 July 2020 while the story was tweaked for Samthaan's absence until his return. Erica Fernandes and Aamna Sharif tested negative but were advised to shoot from their respective homes. After a week, Fernandes decided to resume shooting on the sets. On recovering and testing negative, Samthaan quarantined himself for two weeks and returned to shoot on 6 August 2020.

The shooting of the series wrapped up on 18 September 2020.

=== Broadcast ===
Kasautii Zindagii Kay was supposed to premiere on 10 September 2018, but was postponed to 25 September 2018.

On 19 March 2020, the shoot of the series was indefinitely halted due to the coronavirus outbreak the airing halted on 23 March 2020 when the remaining episodes were broadcast. After more than three months, the filming of the series was resumed on 27 June 2020. New episodes started airing from 13 July 2020 on Star Plus.

=== Cancellation ===
With a drastic decrease in ratings post the coronavirus outbreak, in September 2020 the series was confirmed to go off air in October 2020.

The last episode of Kasautii aired on 3 October 2020.

== Reception ==
=== Critical response ===
Shweta Kesari from India Today said, "Parth Samthaan and Erica Fernandes beautifully fit into the shoes of punctual Anurag and carefree Prerna. The grandeur and magnificence of the show will make your jaw drop. The makers have tried to retain the essence of Kolkata and Bengalis. Overall the show is a complete package of entertainment for soap viewers!"

Soumya Srivastava from Hindustan Times described the show as "louder and garnish" and said, "The background score is excessive. It plays without reason and way too often. Whether the scene demands it or not, a joyful, somber or a comical tone is always there to force your brain into thinking that this is how you are supposed to feel right now."

Times Now commented that, "The reboot takes you in the lives of Anurag and Prerna that were part of our every day lives and the first episode is all about nostalgia of the epic Kasautii Zindagii Kay."

Priyanka Bansal from The Quint stated, "Both Erica Fernandes and Parth Samthaan are new and have huge shoes to fill. More often than not, Erica looks bored and still has a long way to go with her acting skills. The chemistry between Parth and Erica too seems to be lacking. When it comes to production values, it of course shows primarily in the sets. As OTT and royal as they come, they scream money from the rooftops."

The Times of India stated, "Kasautii Zindagii Kay 2 has a cinematic appeal. The visuals and the sets are grand. The difference in the financial status of Anurag and Prerna is well brought-out through their homes and familial set-up. Even though the show moves at a swift pace, it is the long introduction of characters in the beginning that is bound to make you impatient. Erica and Parth look their part, yet there is more one wants to see out of them in the upcoming episodes. The first episode is a breezy watch and keeps you hooked."

=== Ratings ===
Kasautii opened with a rating of 5.5 million impressions in its debut week occupying the tenth position in Hindi GEC urban. However, the following week it dropped to the 15th position with 4.6 million impressions and to the eighteenth position with 4.6 million impressions the next week. The following week, the viewership further dipped to 4.3 million, occupying the thirteenth position. Week 43 saw the show gaining 4.9 million impressions and occupying the fifteenth position, followed by the twelfth position with 5.2 impressions the next week. In week 51, it entered the top 10 occupying the seventh position with 6.3 million impressions while the following week it dropped to the eleventh position with 5.1 million impressions. In the first week of 2019, it further decreased to the sixteenth position with 4.8 million impressions and further to 4.5 million impressions the next week occupying the fifteenth position in urban. In week 5 it was at the fifteenth position garnering 4.6 million impressions. Soon, the ratings started to increase and it re-entered top ten at week 9 with a TRP of 1.8 and the next week it rose to the eight position garnering a TRP of 2.0. The next week it increased to 2.2, occupying the fourth position and to 2.3 the following week at the sixth position. In week 13, it garnered a TRP of 2.2 occupying the sixth position and the following week, a TRP of 2.3. The next week, it maintained the same position and TRP. It maintained its TRP of 2.2 and 2.3 in the consecutive weeks, until in week 19, when it rose to third position with TRP of 2.6 while in week 20, it topped the list for the first time with 6.5 million impressions and a trp of 3 in urban and at third position in Hindi GEC overall with 10.38 million impressions. The following week it was the second most watched in urban with 6.8 million impressions and fourth most overall with 11 million impressions. However, on week 22, after Hina Khan's exit, it dropped down to fourth position and the following week to the fifth position garnering 5.2 million impressions. On week 24, it further declined to seventh position with a TRP of 1.9. In week 28, it declined to the eighth position and to the tenth position in week 30 with a TRP of 2.1. In week 38, it was at the thirteenth position with 4.6 million impressions and dipped further to the fourteenth position with 4 million impressions in week 40. In week 42, it increased to 4.3 million impressions occupying the thirteenth position and to 4.8 million impressions the following week. In week 46, it dipped to 3.5 million impressions occupying the nineteenth position. It increased to 5.3 million impressions days after Aamna Sharif's entry in week 48 occupying the twelfth position and dropped to 5.1 million impressions occupying the tenth position the following week.

In the first week of 2020, the series was at the twelfth position with 5 million impressions and TRP of 2.0. In the third week, it was at the fourteenth position with 5.1 million impressions while the following week it dropped to the eighteenth position with 4 million impressions. In the sixth and eighth week, it garnered a TRP of 1.9. Before the introduction of the eight year leap, the ratings increased garnering 5.2 million impressions and occupying the twelfth position, while the following week it occupied the fourteenth position with 5.1 million impressions. After a three-month break, owing to the coronavirus outbreak, the series resumed airing in June 2020, and the ratings of the series saw a drastic drop.

== Soundtrack ==
Kasautii Zindagii Kay Original Soundtrack

Soundtrack album by Priya Bhattacharya Babul Supriyo
- Genres: Romance; Soundtrack
- Language: Hindi
- Producers: Priya Bhattacharya; Babul Supriyo

Kasautii Zindagii Kay's title track was sung and recreated by the composers and singers of the original series, Babul Supriyo and Priya Bhattacharya.

== Adaptations ==
Year	Title	Language	Channel	Notes	Reference
2019–2020	Premaloka	Kannada	Star Suvarna	Remake version starring Vijay Suirya and Ankita Navya Gowda	

== Awards and nominations ==
Year	Award	Category	Nominee	Result	Reference
2019	Indian Telly Awards	Best Actor In Lead Role (Popular)	Parth Samthaan	Nominated	
2019	Indian Telly Awards	Best Actress In Lead Role (Popular)	Erica Fernandes	Nominated	
2019	Indian Telly Awards	Best Daily Series (Popular)	Balaji Telefilms	Nominated	
2019	Indian Telly Awards	Best Actress In Supporting Role (Popular)	Shubhavi Choksey	Nominated	
2019	Indian Telly Awards	Best Actor In Comic Role (Popular)	Sahil Anand	Nominated	
2019	Indian Telly Awards	Best Actress in Negative Role (Popular)	Shubhavi Choksey	Nominated	
2019	Indian Telly Awards	Best Actor In Negative Role (Popular)	Sanjay Swaraj	Nominated	
2019	Indian Telly Awards	Best Jodi (Popular)	Parth Samthaan & Erica Fernandes	Won	
2019	Indian Telly Awards	Best Actress In Negative Role (Jury)	Hina Khan	Won	
2019	Indian Telly Awards	Best Actress In Negative Role (Popular)	Hina Khan	Won	
2019	Gold Awards	Best Actor Male (Popular)	Parth Samthaan	Nominated	
2019	Gold Awards	Best Actor Female (Popular)	Erica Fernandes	Nominated	
2019	Gold Awards	Best Actor Female (Critics)	Erica Fernandes	Won	
2019	Gold Awards	Best Onscreen Jodi (Popular)	Parth Samthaan & Erica Fernandes	Nominated	
2019	Gold Awards	Best Actor In Supporting Role (Male)	Uday Tikekar	Nominated	
2019	Gold Awards	Best Actor In Supporting Role (Female)	Pooja Banerjee	Nominated	
2019	Gold Awards	Best Actor In Comic Role (Male)	Sahil Anand	Nominated	
2019	Gold Awards	Best Actor In Negative Role (Female)	Hina Khan	Won	
2019	Gold Awards	Best Actor In Negative Role (Male)	Karan Singh Grover	Won	
2019	Indian Television Academy Awards	Best Actress (Popular)	Erica Fernandes	Nominated	
2019	Indian Television Academy Awards	Best Show (Popular)	Balaji Telefilms	Nominated	
2019	Asian Viewers Television Awards	Male Actor Of The Year	Parth Samthaan	Nominated	
2019	Asian Viewers Television Awards	Female Actor Of The Year	Erica Fernandes	Won	
2019	Asian Viewers Television Awards	Soap Of The Year	Balaji Telefilms	Nominated	
