= Love Adhura =

2024 Indian web series

- Genre: Crime; Thriller
- Written by: Shivam Sen
- Directed by: Tanveer Bookwala
- Starring: Erica Fernandes; Karan Kundrra; Vivek Madaan; Saqib Ayub
- Country of origin: India
- Original language: Hindi
- No. of seasons: 1
- No. of episodes: 4

Production
- Editor: Vineet Khullar
- Production company: Ding Entertainment

Original release
- Network: Amazon Mini TV; Amazon Prime
- Release: 13 March 2024

Love Adhura is an Indian Hindi-language romantic-thriller web series streaming on Amazon Mini TV and Amazon Prime platform directed by Tanveer Bookwala and written by Shivam Sen. It stars Erica Fernandes and Karan Kundrra in the lead role. The series released on 13 March 2024. It is shot in Munnar and depicts mystery, thrill, intimacy, and romance.

== Plot ==
A simple guy meets a charming damsel who cons him out of his car, leading to unexpected twists and dramatic consequences involving his overbearing father and a staged romance at their resort.

While acting as a couple Sumit falls for Nandita and she too is confused. She realizes they are from different worlds and real life doesn't allow a happy ending, no matter how beautiful the present. As they part ways, Sumit falls victim to one last con by Nandita, but there is one final twist in the tale.

== Cast ==
- Erica Fernandes as Nandita.
- Karan Kundrra as Sumit.
- Vivek Madaan as Sukhwinder Narula, Sumit's Father
- Saqib Ayub as Prakash.
- Aaryan Khullar as young Sumit.
- Chirag Khatri as Harsh, Sumit's friend.

== Episodes ==
No. overall	No. in season	Title	Directed by	Written by	Original release date
1	1	"First Meet"	Tanveer Bookwala	Tanveer Bookwala	13 March 2024
Sumit, A simple unassuming guy gives Nandita, a damsel in distress a lift and gets conned out of his vintage car in the bargain. But she's not the only one after the car.
2	1	"Ek Nayi Original Kahaani"	Tanveer Bookwala	Tanveer Bookwala	13 March 2024
Sumit finds Nandita and hires her for a job in lieu of turning her into the police. The job is to convince his overbearing father that she's his girlfriend but he finds himself falling for her.
3	1	"Teri Meri Puraani Yaadein"	Tanveer Bookwala	Tanveer Bookwala	13 March 2024
Nandita realises that there are sinister events unfolding in and around the car and there are more players involved while Sumit remains blissfully unaware. Though Nandita's job is over, Sumit has fallen in love and doesn't want her to go.
4	1	"Safarnama Ka Aakhri Chapter"	Tanveer Bookwala	Tanveer Bookwala	13 March 2024
With the job now over, reluctantly, Sumit and Nandita decide to part ways, but not before one last con.
