= Kuch Rang Pyar Ke Aise Bhi: Nayi Kahaani =

Indian romantic drama television series

- Also known as: KRPKAB
- Genre: Romantic drama Family drama
- Created by: Yash A Patnaik
- Written by: Mamta Yash Patnaik, Harneet Singh, Shashwant Rai Gaurav
- Screenplay by: Sonal Ganatra, Gaurav Misra
- Story by: Mamta Patnaik
- Directed by: Noel Smith; Prateek Shah
- Creative director: Shibani Das Gupta
- Starring: See below
- Theme music composer: Adil-Prashant
- Opening theme: "Kuch Rang Pyaar Ke Aise Bhi" by Subhajit Mukherjee and Arpita Mukherjee
- Country of origin: India
- Original language: Hindi
- No. of episodes: 90

Production
- Producers: Yash A Patnaik; Mamata Yash A Patnaik
- Cinematography: Dinesh Singh
- Editors: Kshitja Khandagale; Bhopendra Singh
- Camera setup: Multi-camera
- Running time: Approx. 20 minutes
- Production companies: Beyond Dreams Entertainment Pvt Ltd; Inspire Films Pvt Ltd

Original release
- Network: Sony Entertainment Television; SonyLIV
- Release: 12 July – 12 November 2021

Related
- Kuch Rang Pyar Ke Aise Bhi; Kamnaa

Kuch Rang Pyar Ke Aise Bhi: Nayi Kahaani (transl. Shades Of Love: New Story) is an Indian Hindi-language romantic drama television series which started airing on 12 July 2021 on Sony TV. It stars Erica Fernandes, Shaheer Sheikh and Supriya Pilgaonkar.

Sequel to Kuch Rang Pyar Ke Aise Bhi, it is the 3rd season of the same series with a new story and new characters were unfolded.

== Plot ==
After their 9th anniversary and post a leap of 2 years, Dev and Sonakshi are shown to be emotionally and mentally detached from each other, due to work-related stress and the challenges in parenting their daughter Suhana and toddler son Shubh, while Ishwari enjoys being a grandparent to them. Radharani and Baldev still live in the "Ishwari Niwas", while Elena, Vicky, and Golu have shifted to an apartment after Elena became an internet sensation. Bijoy lives with Saurabh, Ronita, and Mishti, after his wife Asha's death.

Dev soon learns that a stranger, Rohit Verma, who is on his deathbed following a rash driving incident which Dev experienced, has been calling out for him. Reaching there, he finds out from him that Ayushmann, who considers Rohit his father, is actually Dev's son with Sona, and that Suhana, who lives with the couple, is actually Rohit's daughter with his late wife Meenal Arora. Verma; the two kids had been switched at birth, since Rohit wanted an heir. However Meenal died some time after. Rohit dies immediately after the confession, and Dev reveals the entire truth to Sona. This brings up turbulence in the Dixit family. Suhana starts feeling insecure about her family's love for her with the sudden arrival of a same-aged new brother that her grandmother clearly dotes more upon. Ayushmaan feels unsettled in his new home and struggles with Ishwari’s overt affections. To balance their love and time for all three of their children and maintain the relationships of their own marriage, Sonakshi and Dev struggle with Ishwari's overprotective nature for Aayushman, who she renames "Ved", a reversal of "Dev". Following an incident, Ayushmann accepts the Dixit family and Suhana slowly overcomes her insecurities. Ishwari learns the error of her recent behaviour and vows to love both Ayushmaan and Suhana equally. Dev and Sonakshi take up marriage counseling and Dev understands the real reason why Sonakshi was angry - he failed to support her in the months immediately following Asha's death. They mend their relationship after she learns that Dev was consuming anxiety pills, which causes them to reconcile and seek out the marriage counselor with fresh rigour.

Meanwhile, Sanjana Arora, a young interior designer, decides to join Dev's company after she becomes intrigued overhearing him at a florist's shop when he is buying a bouquet for Sona. Growingly besotted with Dev, she befriends him and tries to learn more about him, but gets shocked after learning at an informal office party that he is married and was separated from Sona for seven years after Dev reveals his special guest to be Sona's friend and colleague Jatin Roy, who Dev thanks for supporting his wife. Yet, she believes in "serendipity" and has fallen for him. So she makes continuous efforts to impress Dev, thus making Sona insecure. As it turns out, Sanjana is shown to be related to Rohit in some manner and has come looking for him. During a dinner she is invited to by the Dixit family, by which time Dev's sister Neha has also joined them, Sanjana fears losing out on an opportunity to speak her heart out and eventually confesses her feelings to Dev just as Sona arrives. Although Sona is suspicious, Dev, who is as much confused as Sona, dismisses it as a skit Sanjana was supposed to perform as part of a game hosted by the children. The very next day, however, her attempts to actually inform him about her feelings culminate in Dev losing his temper on her, as he tells her he is a married man with a committed and loving family and that feelings at work have no place in his work culture or life.

Sanjana decides to resign to her fate, but soon learns that Rohit died in an accident; it is revealed that she is Rohit's sister-in-law and Meenal's biological sister, thus being Suhana's biological aunt. The next day, she informs a still angry Dev about her relation with Suhana, confusing him. Sona arrives there unexpectedly, and learns about it. Later, however, when Sanjana comes up with proof of her relation, she instead finds Sona in Dev's place; Sona bitterly chastises Sanjana for her obsession with Dev and sternly warns her to stay away from her family, especially Dev and Suhana. Extremely hurt, Sanjana decides to avenge her humiliation at Sona's hands to ensure that Sona loses the support of all her dear ones, including Dev.

Seeking a second chance, Sanjana cunningly targets Sona's kin as part of her revenge plans. She first attempts to murder Bijoy and electrocutes him, though he is rescued just in time by Dev and Sona, but falls into a coma. She later hides an instrumental file of documents related to the Asha Foundation, which leads to Vicky getting arrested despite multiple efforts on Dev's part; Elena shrugs Sona off in the events that follow. Although the Dixit family hires a lawyer, she deceivingly gets Vicky bailed out, earning the affection of Radharani, Elena and Neha; Ishwari permits Sanjana to temporarily stay in the Dixit house with great hesitation. Sanjana also gains Neha's trust and turns her against Sonakshi, later luring Dev away from Delhi on a highway at night, where she succeeds in sedating him and getting intimate with him, though he has no recollection of what happened. Finally, Diwali arises and everyone is celebrating at home when photos of Dev and Sanjana being intimate are leaked to the media and go viral. Although Sona angrily decides to walk away, Ishwari and Radharani surprisingly decide to kick Dev and Sanjana out of the house instead, asking Sona to stay back.

However, it is soon revealed that Dev and Sonakshi are meeting in secret and have figured out that Sanjana is hiding her real intentions, and they devise a plan to crowd her out, taking Ishwari into confidence. Sanjana, however, has figured out his location and overhears the entire plan; Dev returns home, but by the time a good part of the plan has worked out, with both Neha and Vicky getting convinced that she manipulated them, and Dev and Sona being alerted about her credentials as a software engineer who indulges in hacking and stole the credentials of a real interior designer Prerna Sharma to find her way into the office, an angry Sanjana has already brainwashed Rohit's parents into claiming custody for Suhana, who eventually finds out in a heated confrontation that Dev and Sonakshi are not her biological parents. Suhana forgives Dev and Sona after Ayushmann intervenes, having developed a close bond with her. The matter is taken to court, but no judgment is ruled since Dev and Sona do not have any concrete evidence to prove Sanjana's evil nature.

With only two days left for the final verdict to release, the Dixits figure out that her files may contain some evidence; though a restless check on her files doesn't initially work, Dev flings the papers in frustration, only for a photograph of Asha to fall to the floor and come cleanly visible to everyone. Realizing that Asha's was the dearest photograph which went missing from Bijoy's album, even as Jatin reveals that Sanjana wanted to harm someone from the Dixit family, Sona figures out in an epiphany that she was the target, and Saurabh and Dev conclude that the only way to blow Sanjana's cover is to let her know that Bijoy isn't dead but is actually just comatose, hoping that she be disturbed and hastily rush to her own doom. Sanjana reaches the hospital in anger as she learns of this through her lawyer, and is almost about to suffocate Bijoy in everyone's absence, when Saurabh, Dev and Sona reveal themselves and corner her.

Despite becoming aware that her actions have been taped on camera and will be handed over to the law, Sanjana deduces that she was lured, and finally admits to her revenge against Sona; in a sudden move, she holds Sona at knifepoint, asking Dev to passionately claim love for herself while shouting out that she has hated Sona bitterly and is yearning for Dev's affection. However, she is overpowered by Sona, and it is soon revealed that the police has been spectating the entire scene. Vicky brings the cops to arrest Sanjana, who leaves without guilt. Rohit's parents, realizing the malaise in Sanjana's intent, now agree to let Suhana stay at the Dixits' place since they feel that the atmosphere is indeed perfect for her. Later, Neha reveals that she is pregnant. The show concludes on a happy note, with Dev and Sonakshi celebrating their 10th anniversary.

== Soundtrack ==
The soundtrack of the show was composed by Adil-Prasant. Songs were sung by Subhajit Mukherjee and Arpita Mukherjee. In the S3 The Show has Acquired Many Songs

No.	Title
1.	"Ye Lamhe Hazar Se"
3.	"Pagle Se Din Hai Meri Badli Se Raatein (Duet)"
4.	"Pagle Se Din Hai Meri Badli Se Raatein (Female)"
5.	"Pagle Se Din Hai Meri Badli Se Raatein (Male)"
6.	"Tu Mujhme Mujhse Zyaada Hai (Male)"
7.	"Tu Mujhme Mujhse Zyaada Hai (Female)"
8.	"Tu Mujhme Mujhse Jyada Hai (Duet)"
9.	"Kismat Ke Lekhe Kisne Dekhe (KRPKAB SAD)"
11.	"Tujhse Naraz Nhi Zindagi (Male/Season 3) (Acquired)"
12.	"Tujhse Naraz Nhi Zindagi (Female/Season 3) (Acquired)"
13.	"Pyaar......Ek Tarfah (Female/Season 3) (Acquired)"
