= Aladin & Alakadam =

- Genre: Musical Comedy Drama
- Created by: Lunar Film
- Starring: Cole Gribble; Ali Mensan; Mike Michael; Sica Magdalena; Jon Mini; Ivan Mini; Ryma Gembala; Ginanjar; Sumaisy Djaitov Yanda; Shaheer Sheikh; Vin Rana; Clay Gribble; Ucok Baba; Vista Putri
- Country of origin: Indonesia
- Original language: Indonesian
- No. of seasons: 1
- No. of episodes: 17

Production
- Production locations: Jakarta, Indonesia
- Running time: One hour (09:00-10:00pm Indonesian Western Time)
- Production company: Lunar Film

Original release
- Network: ANTV
- Release: October 29 – November 11, 2016

Aladin & Alakadam is an Indonesian soap opera produced by Lunar Film. It first aired on ANTV on October 29, 2016.

== Synopsis ==
Aladin and Alakadam tells about a child orphan named Aladin or commonly called Ali (Cole Gribble). Aladin 2 junior high school in grade and lived with his mother, who was a baker named Umi Atikah (Sisca Magdalena).

Keseruan Meet Fans quiz program in Yogyakarta One time, Aladin was taken to a creepy old house by a neighbor named Farel (Mike Michael). Farel known as someone who always disturb neighbors Aladin and mock the simplicity of Aladin.

In the old house, Aladdin find a lamp cepor Jin Alakadam (Ali Mensan) surrounded. Aladin is beginning to figure Jin fear Alakadam big man slowly began receiving Jin Alakadam for acting funny and childish. Because it has been freed from prison cempor lights, Alakadam feel indebted to Aladin. They help each other face the people who intend evil against them.

Alakadam must escape-mistiness avoid enemies that Burak (Jon Mini) and Burik (Ivan Mini), jin bald berkuncung which is the messenger of King Jin. King Jin wants Alakadam brought back to the kingdom of Jin's marriage to her daughter, Princess Lolady (Rima Shepherd), which has a great body and greatly admired Alakadam. In addition, Alakadam also must deal with Emil (Ginanjar) and Kamil (Sumaisy Djaitov Yanda), two thieves were always intending to steal the contents of the house Alakadam.

== Cast ==
- Cole Gribble as Young Aladin/Ali
- Ali Mensan as Alakadam
- Mike Michael as Farel
- Sisca Magdalena as Atikah
- Jon Mini as Burak
- Ivan Mini as Burik
- Ryma Gembala as Lolady
- Ginanjar as Emil
- Sumaisy Djaitov Yanda as Kamil
- Shaheer Sheikh as Aladdin
- Vin Rana as Purab Khanna
- Clay Gribble as Clay
- Ucok Baba sebagai Baba
- Vista Putri sebagai Vera
- Juan Hendry
