= Alpesh Dhakan =

Indian actor

Alpesh Dhakan (born 25 February 1985) is an Indian television actor known for having portrayed the role of Lord Ganesha in the serial, Devon Ke Dev...Mahadev that aired on Life OK from 2011 to 2014. He is also known for playing the role of Saurabh Bose in the drama series, Kuch Rang Pyar Ke Aise Bhi.

== Career ==
Dhakan began his acting career with a small role in the play, Achalayatan (The Immovable), by Rabindranath Tagore in September 2008. His second play was Muktidhaam in 2009. From 2010 to 2011, he appeared in the VRG Drama, Gandhi Before Gandhi at the JAINA Convention in Antwerp and subsequent shows in Indian cities such as Ahmedabad, Mumbai, and Hyderabad.

Dhakan's first television appearance came in 2011, with him landing the role of the youngest son of the Uttank family in the serial Sanskaar Laxmi, which aired on Zee TV. In 2012, he appeared in Parichay — Nayee Zindagi Kay Sapno Ka on Colors TV, Kya Hua Tera Vadaa on Sony and F.I.R. on Sab TV. In 2013, he worked in Dil Se Di Dua... Saubhagyavati Bhava and Savitri, both on Life OK. In November 2013, he appeared in the role of Lord Ganesha in the mythological series, Devon Ke Dev...Mahadev on Life OK. He has played minor roles in Rakshak on Life OK in 2013, Emotional Atyachar on Channel V in 2013, Comedy Nights with Kapil on Colors TV in 2014, and Kuch Rang Pyar Ke Aise Bhi on Sony TV from 2016 to 2017. Makers Won't Confirm That He will Part Of Kuch Rang Pyar Ke Aise Bhi Season 3.

Dhakan appeared in Kevi Rite Jaish, a 2012 Gujarati drama film directed by Abhishek Jain. His movie Yaan was a Tamil action thriller film directed by the cinematographer, Ravi K. Chandran, where he plays the role of Vikas.
