= Seher – Hone Ko Hai =

Indian drama television series

- Genre: Romance; Drama; Social issue
- Created by: Richa Yamini
- Inspired by: Kizil Goncalar by Sukru Necati Sahin
- Written by: Richa Yamini; Sameer Siddiqi
- Starring: Bhavika Sharma; Parth Samthaan; Vaquar Shaikh; Ruchi Savarn; Kanika Maheshwari
- Composers: Sarthak; Nakul
- Country of origin: India
- Original language: Hindi
- No. of seasons: 1
- No. of episodes: 267

Production
- Producers: Richa Yamini; Bhavna Vyas
- Cinematography: Nidhin Valanday
- Camera setup: Multi-camera
- Running time: 20 minutes
- Production companies: Icecream Dreams; Aarambh Entertainment

Original release
- Network: Colors TV
- Release: 2 December 2025 – 13 November 2026

Seher – Hone Ko Hai (transl. Dawn – Is About To Break) is an Indian Hindi-language romantic drama television series that premiered from 2 December 2025 to 13 November 2026 on Colors TV and streams digitally on JioHotstar. Produced by Richa Yamini under Ice-cream Dreams and Aarambh Entertainment, it stars Bhavika Sharma and Parth Samthaan. The series is a loose adaptation of Turkish drama, Kizil Goncalar.

== Plot ==
Sixteen-year-old Seher Baig dreams to be a doctor, secretly studying far from her father’s crushing orthodoxy and cruelty in Husainpur.

However, when she and her mother Kauser are forced to move to Lucknow to live with her father and his second wife, her fragile dream soon begins to slip through her fingers as her father betrothes her to Mahid Niyazi, the grandson of the city’s revered mufti.

Twenty-three-year-old Mahid Niyazi is religious and principled with an uncontrollable temper rooted from childhood trauma, holding conservative and misogynistic values.

As Seher slowly starts developing feelings for Mahid, she is forced to choose between betraying her new husband, who remains oblivious to her real age, and her dreams. But in a world that has already decided who she should be, how far can a girl go to become who she is meant to be?

== Cast ==
=== Main ===
- Bhavika Sharma as Dr. Seher Baig Niyazi: Kausar and Parvez's elder daughter; Safiya's step-daughter; Amaal's sister; Asad's half-sister; Mahid's wife; Meher's mother (2026)
  - Rishita Kothari as teenage Seher (2025–2026)
- Parth Samthaan as Mufti Mohammed Mahid Niyazi: Adnan and Ghazala's son; Rukshar's step-son; Zeenat and Zaid's half-brother; Seher's husband; Meher's father (2025–2026)
  - Mayank Yadav as child Mahid (2026)

=== Recurring ===
- Vaquar Shaikh as Parvez Baig: Barkat's brother; Kausar and Safiya's husband; Seher, Amaal and Asad's father; Meher's grandfather (2025–2026)
- Mahhi Vij as Kausar Baig: Parvez's first wife; Seher and Amaal's mother; Asad's step-mother; Meher's grandmother (2025–2026)
- Sia Bhatia as Amaal Quadri: Kausar and Parvez's younger daughter; Fareed and Sultana's adopted daughter; Safiya's step-daughter; Seher's sister; Asad's half-sister (2026)
  - Mahima Joshi as teenage Amaal (2025–2026)
- Falak Khan as Safiya Baig: Parvez's second wife; Asad's mother; Seher and Amaal's step-mother; Meher's step grandmother (2025–2026)
- Sarwam Kulkarni as Asad Baig: Parvez and Safiya's son; Kausar's step-son; Seher and Amaal's half-brother (2026)
  - Ritvik Choudhary as young Asad (2025–2026)
- Shriya Tiwari as Barkat Baig: Parvez's sister; Kausar and Seher's well-wisher (2025–2026)
- Farooq Khan as Dr. Zafar Quadri: Fareed's father; Amaal's adoptive grandfather (2025)
- Apurva Agnihotri as Dr. Fareed Quadri: Zafar's son; Sultana's husband; Amaal's adoptive father (2025–2026)
- Khalida Jan as Dr. Sultana Quadri: Fareed's wife; Amaal's adoptive mother (2025–2026)
- Deepak Qazir as Osmaan Niyazi: Adnan and Husn Ara's father; Zeenat, Zaid, Mahid and Haider's grandfather; Meher's great grandfather (2025–2026) (Dead)
- Ruchi Savarn as Rukshar Niyazi: Adnan's first wife; Zeenat and Zaid's mother; Mahid's step-mother; Meher's step grandmother (2026)
- Shreya Dave as Zeenat Niyazi: Adnan and Rukshar's daughter; Zaid's sister; Mahid's half-sister; Sohail's wife (2026)
- Arya Mahajan as Sohail: Zeenat's husband (2026)
- Divyansh Anandani as Zaid Niyazi: Adnan and Rukshar's son; Zeenat's brother; Mahid's half-brother (2026)
- Nargish Rajput as Ghazala Niyazi: Adnan's second wife; Mahid's mother; Zeenat and Zaid's step-mother; Meher's grandmother (2026) (Dead)
- Unknown as Meher Niyazi: Mahid and Seher's daughter (2026)
- Kanika Maheshwari as Husn Ara "Husna" Niyazi: Osmaan's daughter; Adnan's sister; Hakeem's wife; Haider's mother (2026) (Dead)
- Saleem Zaidi as Hakeem Saheb: Husn Ara's husband-turned-widower (2026)
- Gaurav Sharma as Haider Rehmani: Husn Ara's son; Insha's husband; Kaiz's step-father (2026)
- Sumit Singh as Insha Rehmani: Haider's wife; Kaiz's mother (2026)
- Behzaad Khan as Wasim Niyazi: Osmaan's nephew; Fatima's husband; Nazima's father (2025–2026)
- Nilofar Gesawat as Fatima Niyazi: Wasim's wife; Nazima's mother (2025-2026)
- Nidhi Gangta as Nazima "Nazo" Niyazi (formerly Hashmi): Wasim and Fatima's daughter; Mahid's obsessive lover; Khalid's ex-wife (2025–2026)
- Unknown as Khalid Hashmi: Nazima's ex-husband (2026)
- Snehil Kukreti as Tahir: Mahid's best friend (2025–2026)
- Abeer Shah as Muhammad Kaiz: Insha's son; Haider's step-son (2026)
- Sanjeev Jaiswal as Zafar Ali: a Nawab (2026)
- Sarika Dhillon as Dr. Zeba Ahmed (2026)
- Khushi Gupta as Uzma: Niyazi's maid (2026)
- Tanya Lal / Pooja Kushwaha as Rashida: Niyazi's maid (2026)
- Nabila Khan as Fake Ghazala (2026)

=== Guest appearances ===
- Pravisht Mishra as Krishna Bacchan from Bareilly Ki Bacchan (2026)

== Production ==
=== Release ===
In late October 2025, Colors TV unveiled a teaser introducing the new show titled Seher Hone Ko Hai, featuring Rishita Kothari and Mahhi Vij. The series was released on 2 December 2025.

=== Casting ===
Parth Samthaan was confirmed to play male lead, Mahid. Mahhi Vij was reported join the cast as Kausar, and marks her return to TV after a 9-year hiatus. Apurva Agnihotri was signed for the role of Dr. Farid. Vaquar Shaikh were announced join as Parvez. In May 2026, Vij who played Kausar quit the series. In June 2026, Sumit Singh entered the series as Insha. In mid June 2026, the makers were struggling to find a new Seher Baig for the 7-year time leap. Actresses like Shivangi Joshi, Ashi Singh, Mallika Singh, Riya Sharma and Himanshi Parashar were approached for the role of Seher Baig and finally Bhavika Sharma was chosen to play the role of Seher Baig.

=== Cancellation ===
The filming of the series wrapped up on 6 November 2026. Lead actor Samthaan revealed that the show was not originally meant to conclude at that stage. He went on to say that Colors was not behind the decision to take it off air. Seher – Hone Ko Hai ended on 14 November and its timeslot was filled by Queen.

== Awards and nominations ==
Year	Award	Category	Recipient	Result	Ref.
2026	Indian Television Academy Awards	Best Art Director - TV	Nikhil Bhatia	Pending	
2026	Indian Television Academy Awards	Best Costume Designer - TV	Anuradha Khurana	Pending	
2026	Indian Television Academy Awards	Best DOP - TV	Nidhin Valanday	Pending	
2026	Indian Television Academy Awards	Best Music Composer - TV	Sarthak & Nakul	Pending	
2026	Indian Television Academy Awards	Best Actor Drama Popular	Parth Samthaan	Pending	
2026	Indian Television Academy Awards	Best Drama Popular	Seher - Hone Ko Hai	Pending	
