= Erica Fernandes =

Indian actress (born 1993)

- Fernandes in 2021
- Born: Erica Jennifer Fernandes; 7 May 1993 (age 33); Mumbai, Maharashtra, India
- Occupations: Actress; model
- Years active: 2013–present
- Known for: Kuch Rang Pyar Ke Aise Bhi; Kasautii Zindagii Kay; Kuch Rang Pyar Ke Aise Bhi: Nayi Kahaani

Erica Jennifer Fernandes (pronounced [ˈɛɾɪka fəɾˈnændɛz]; born 7 May 1993) is an Indian actress and former model known for her work in television. She has featured in Tamil, Hindi, Telugu and Kannada films. Fernandes made her debut in Tamil film Ainthu Ainthu Ainthu. She got her breakthrough with her television debut, portraying Dr. Sonakshi Bose in Kuch Rang Pyar Ke Aise Bhi. She has also acted in Kannada film Ninnindale. Fernandes is also known for her portrayal of Prerna Sharma in Kasautii Zindagii Kay.

== Early life ==
Erica Jennifer Fernandes was born on 7th May 1993 in Mumbai to Ralph Fernandes and Lavina Fernandes, in a Mangalorean Catholic Konkani family. She did her schooling from Holy Cross High School, Kurla and completed her Pre-Degree Course from Sies College Of Arts, Science & Commerce, Sion. She had enrolled for a BA degree from St Andrew's College, Bandra. Later she discontinued her studies to pursue a career in modelling.

== Career ==
=== Modelling career ===
She always aspired to be a model since childhood, which earned her the crown of "Bombay Times Fresh Face", "Pantaloons Femina Miss Fresh Face 2011" and "Pantaloons Femina Miss Maharashtra" in 2010 and 2011 respectively.

=== Film debut and success (2013–2015) ===
Director Sasi had seen pictures of her at Meera Kathiravan's office, with whom she was shooting another film, when he was casting for Ainthu Ainthu Ainthu. Sasi offered her a role of a software engineer in the film alongside Bharath, who plays her love interest. Due to the delay of her other films, Ainthu Ainthu Ainthu became her first release. In 2014, she made her debut in Kannada with the film Ninnindale, featuring alongside Puneeth Rajkumar, which was followed by her debut Hindi film, Babloo Happy Hai, directed by Nila Madhab Panda.

She was selected to play the lead role in the Tamil film Virattu, featuring newcomer Sujiv, son of the director Kumar. In February 2014, Virattu eventually released. Galipatam became her first Telugu release. The film received decent reviews from critics, who also noted that Erica "does a good job" and "shows maturity". In 2015, she appeared in the Kannada film Buguri.

=== Television debut, breakthrough and success (2016–2020) ===
In 2016, Fernandes made her television debut with Sony TV's Kuch Rang Pyar Ke Aise Bhi where she portrayed Dr. Sonakshi Bose, opposite Shaheer Sheikh. The show was a new age show and her onscreen chemistry with Shaheer Sheikh was appreciated.

Her delayed film with Kathiravan, Vizhithiru, released on 6 October 2017 and saw her feature among an ensemble cast including Krishna, Venkat Prabhu and Sara Arjun.

From 2018 to 2020, she portrayed Prerna Sharma in StarPlus's Kasautii Zindagii Kay, opposite Parth Samthaan.

=== Recent work ===
In 2021, Fernandes reprised her role of Dr. Sonakshi Bose opposite Shaheer Sheikh in the third season of Kuch Rang Pyar Ke Aise Bhi: Nayi Kahaani.

She is currently hosting Emirates Draw. a game show in Dubai, which is live streamed across Emirates Draw's digital platforms YouTube, Facebook, and Website.

In 2023, Erica played the role of Moushmi in an Amazon Mini TV horror film The Haunting. From August 2026 to November 2026, she was signed Dr. Major Naina Sanyal in Colors TV's 108: Base Hospital Uri and marks her television comeback after a 5 year hiatus.

== Media image ==
In 2017, Fernandes was ranked fourth in The Times of India's Most Desirable Women on Indian Television List.

She was also listed third in The Times of India's Most Desirable Women on Indian Television List 2018. In the same year, Times ranked her 8th in the Top 10 Popular Actress in Television.

Fernandes was placed 13th in Eastern Eye's 50 Sexiest Asian Women of 2019 List and fourth in The Times of India's Most Desirable Women On Television List 2019.

Fernandes was ranked first in The Times Most Desirable Women on TV 2020.

== Filmography ==
=== Films ===
Year	Title	Role	Language	Notes
2013	Ainthu Ainthu Ainthu	Manjari	Tamil	
2014	Ninnindale	Pramila	Kannada	
2014	Babloo Happy Hai	Natasha	Hindi	
2014	Virattu	Shri	Tamil	
2014	Galipatam	Swathi	Telugu	
2015	Buguri	Ishanya	Kannada	
2017	Vizhithiru	Christina	Tamil	
2023	The Haunting	Moushmi	Hindi	Short film

=== Television ===
Year	Title	Role	Notes	Ref.
2016–2017	Kuch Rang Pyar Ke Aise Bhi	Dr. Sonakshi Bose Dixit	Season 1 and 2	
2016–2019	Box Cricket League	Herself		
2019	Khatra Khatra Khatra	Herself		
2018–2020	Kasautii Zindagii Kay	Prerna Sharma		
2021	Kuch Rang Pyar Ke Aise Bhi:Nayi Kahani	Dr. Sonakshi Bose Dixit	Season 3	
2026	108: Base Hospital Uri	Dr. Major Naina Sanyal		

=== Web Series ===
Year	Title	Role	Notes	Ref.
2022–2023	Emirates Draw EASY6	Host	Co-Hosted with Kinan Salameh	
2024	Love Adhura	Nandita		
2024	Bada Sheher Choti Family	Shruti Khanna	Mini series	

=== Music Videos ===
Year	Title	Singer(s)	Label	Ref.
2020	Juda Kar Diya	Stebin Ben	Desi Music Factory	
2020	Maula	Papon	Saregama	
2022	Akhiyan	Shekhar Khanijo	Shekhar Khanijo	
2022	Tumhe Pyaar Karungga	Lakshay Kapoor	VYRL Originals	
2023	Wo Kashish	Javed Ali, Anweshaa	Kashish Music	
2023	Ishq Hua	Javed Ali, Aakritti Mehra	Blue Music Record Label	

== Awards and nominations ==
Year	Award	Category	Work	Result	Ref.
2015	SIIMA Awards	Best Debut Actress - Kannada	Ninnindale	Nominated	
2016	Gold Awards	Best Onscreen Jodi (with Shaheer Sheikh)	Kuch Rang Pyar Ke Aise Bhi	Nominated	
2016	Asian Viewers Television Awards	Female Actor Of The Year	Kuch Rang Pyar Ke Aise Bhi	Won	
2017	Gold Awards	Best Onscreen Jodi (with Shaheer Sheikh)	Kuch Rang Pyar Ke Aise Bhi	Won	
2018	Asian Viewers Television Awards	Female Actor Of The Year	Kuch Rang Pyar Ke Aise Bhi	Nominated	
2018	Asiavision Awards	Best Actress (Television) - Hindi	Kasautii Zindagii Kay	Won	
2019	Indian Telly Awards	Best Jodi Popular (With Parth Samthaan)	Kasautii Zindagii Kay	Won	
2019	Gold Awards	Best Actor Female (Critics)	Kasautii Zindagii Kay	Won	
2019	Gold Awards	Style Diva	—N/a	Won	
2019	Asian Viewers Television Awards	Female Actor Of The Year	Kasautii Zindagii Kay	Won	
2019	Indian Television Academy Awards	Best Actress Popular	Kasautii Zindagii Kay	Nominated	
2021	Iconic Gold Awards	Most Glamorous TV Actress	—N/a	Won	
2022	Iconic Gold Awards	Most Glamorous Actress of the year	—N/a	Won	

== See also ==
- List of Indian television actresses
- List of Indian film actresses
