= Maiboli =

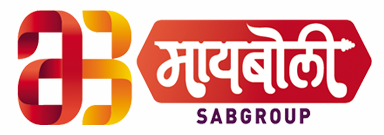
- Country: India
- Network: Sab Network
- Headquarters: Mumbai, Maharashtra, India

Programming
- Language: Marathi
- Picture format: 4:3 (576i, SDTV)

Ownership
- Owner: Sri Adhikari Brothers Television Network Ltd
- Sister channels: Dabangg; Mastiii; Dhamaal TV; Dillagi

History
- Launched: 8 August 2013; 12 years ago
- Closed: 23 January 2026; 2 months ago

Links
- Website: Discontinued

Maiboli is a Marathi-language free-to-air music channel. owned by Sri Adhikari Brothers Television Network Ltd.

== Music shows ==
- Dhingaana
- Coffee Ani Baarich Gaani
- Bhau Mast Vajtay
- Dumdaar Hits

== Former shows ==
- Amrit Manthan - Kirtan Sohala
- Bhakticha Teva
- Maza Dhyanoba - TV Serial
- Aika Dajiba
- Sur Tech Chedita
- Priteechi Jhul Jhul Gaani
- Chandane Shimpit Jashi
- Kayada Cha Kaye
- Aashram Chalu Aahey
- Bakwas 24 Taas
- Bas Taamba
- Happy Crime Time
- Kon Banel Roadpati
- Vatrat Vinya
- Office Che Show piece
- Locha Zala Re Gugle Aala Re
- Andheri Nagari Chopat Raja
- Baiko Sher Navra Pavsher
- Cinemane Pachadla Serialne Zapatla
- Satteche Rangeen Patte
- Hyala Aapat Tyala Aapat
- Bolte Taare
- M...M...Marathicha
- Maiboli Review
- Maiboli Updates
