= Hamare Baarah =

- Directed by: Kamal Chandra
- Story by: Rajan Agarwal
- Produced by: Ravi S Gupta, Birendra Bhagat, Sanjay Nagpal, Sheo Balak Singh
- Starring: Annu Kapoor; Parth Samthaan; Rahul Bagga; Manoj Joshi; Ashwini Kalsekar; Shaan Saxena
- Cinematography: Sethu Sriram
- Edited by: Sanjay Sharma
- Production companies: Radhika G Film; Newtech Media Entertainment
- Distributed by: Viacom18 Studios
- Release date: 21 June 2024
- Running time: 148 minutes
- Country: India
- Language: Hindi
- Box office: 11 crore

Hamare Baarah (Note: Originally titled Hum Do Hamare Baarah (lit. 'We Two and Our Twelve').) is an Indian Hindi-language drama film directed by Kamal Chandra and produced by Radhika G Film & Newtech Media Entertainment, along with producers Ravi S. Gupta, Birender Bhagat, Sanjay Nagpal, and Sheo Balak Singh. The film is co-produced by Triloki Prasad. Along with Annu Kapoor it features cast including Ashwini Kalsekar, Rahul Bagga, Paritosh Tiwari, Parth Samthaan, Manoj Joshi, debutant Aditi Bhatpahri, and others in prominent roles.

The release of the film was initially stayed by the Supreme Court on 13 June 2024. The film was eventually released on 21 June 2024 after the Bombay High Court allowed the release of the film. The film received mixed reviews.

== Synopsis ==
Hamare Baarah follows Manzoor Ali Khan Sanjari, who is married to two women and insists on having more children despite complications of pregnancy. His daughter, Alfiya, takes him to court to save her stepmother's life, sparking a battle between patriarchal traditions and individual rights. The film encourages contemplation of society's views on family size and the importance of women's empowerment.

== Cast ==
- Annu Kapoor as Manzoor Ali Khan Sanjari
- Rahul Bagga
- Manoj Joshi
- Ashwini Kalsekar
- Parth Samthaan
- Shaan Saxena

== Box office ==
The film grossed ₹11.03 crore worldwide during its theatrical run.

== Reception ==
Rosy Panwar, writing for NDTV, gave the movie a rating of 3 out of 5. The Times of India gave it a rating of 2.5/5 and added that the movie "often veers into a narrative that feels more like advocacy than entertainment".

== See also ==
- Demographic threat#India, alleged to be depicted in the film
- The Kerala Story, a 2023 Indian film about the Love jihad conspiracy theory
