= Mastiii =

Music television channel

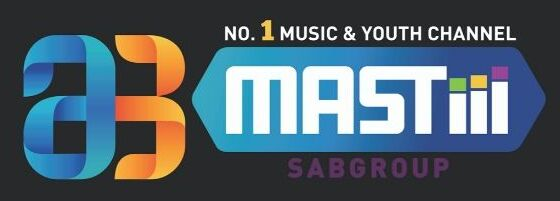
- Mastiii Logo
- Country: India
- Broadcast area: India; Bangladesh
- Network: Sab Network
- Headquarters: Mumbai, Maharashtra, India

Programming
- Language: Hindi
- Picture format: 4:3 (576i, SDTV)

Ownership
- Owner: Sri Adhikari Brothers Television Network Ltd
- Sister channels: Dabangg; Dhamaal TV; Dillagi; Maiboli

History
- Launched: 1 July 2010; 16 years ago
- Closed: 23 January 2026; 7 months ago

Links
- Website: Discontinued

Availability

Terrestrial
- Bell TV (Canada): 34

Mastiii was a Hindi-language free-to-air music television channel. owned by Sri Adhikari Brothers Television Network Ltd. It was among the top five channels in the Hindi music category one month after its launch.

== Programs ==
1. Love Kal Aaj aur Kal
2. Evergreen Hits
3. Hit Hai Toh Bajega
4. Just Mohabbat
5. Mastiii Doubles
6. Raat Ke Humsafar
7. The Golden Era with Annu Kapoor
8. Morning Masti
9. Hit Melodies
