= Shaheer Sheikh =

Indian actor (born 1984)

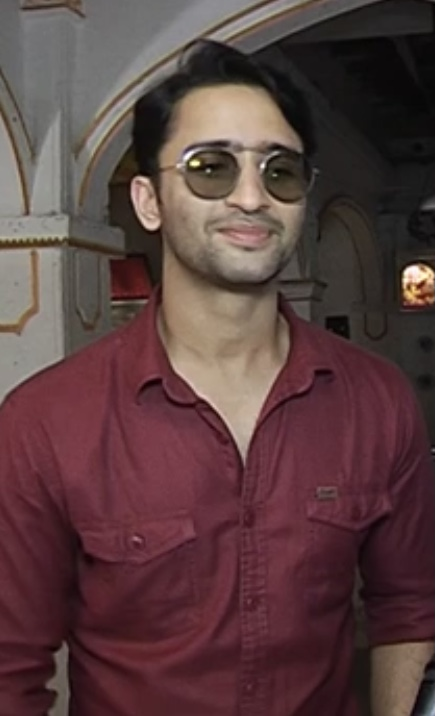
- Sheikh in 2019
- Born: Shaheer Nawaz Sheikh; 26 March 1984 (age 42); Bhaderwah, Jammu and Kashmir, India
- Occupations: Actor; model
- Years active: 2009–present
- Spouse: Ruchikaa Kapoor (m. 2020)
- Children: 2

Shaheer Nawaz Sheikh (born 26 March 1984) is an Indian actor who predominantly works in Hindi television. Considered as one of the highest paid television actors in India, Sheikh is a recipient of several accolades including an ITA Award, an Indian Telly Award and two Gold Awards.

Sheikh made his acting debut in 2009 with portrayal of Veer Mehra in Kya Mast Hai Life (2009–2010), he had his breakthrough with Navya..Naye Dhadkan Naye Sawaal (2011–2012), where he portrayed Anant Bajpai. His performance earned him ITA Award for GR8! Performer of the Year. Sheikh rose to fame with his portrayal of Arjuna in Mahabharat (2013–2014), for which he received widespread acclaim and several nominations.

Post his success with Mahabharat, Sheikh took a break from Indian television and made his Indonesian television debut with Cinta di Langit Taj Mahal (2015) and appeared in several series and films. Sheikh established himself as a leading television actor with his portrayal of Devrath Dixit in Kuch Rang Pyar Ke Aise Bhi (2016–2017) and Abir Rajvansh in Yeh Rishtey Hain Pyaar Ke (2019–2020). He has since portrayed Manav Deshmukh in the web series Pavitra Rishta- Its Never Too Late (2021) and Krishna Chaudhary in Woh Toh Hai Albelaa (2022–2023). Sheikh expanded to Hindi films with Do Patti (2024).

== Early life ==
Sheikh was born on 26 March 1984 in Bhaderwah, Doda, Jammu and Kashmir to Shahnawaz Sheikh and Dilshad Sheikh. He has two younger sisters, Aleefa and Ifrah. He completed his schooling at Little Flower School, Jammu & Hari Singh Higher Secondary School, Jammu. He graduated with a Bachelor of Laws (L.L.B.) degree from New Law College, Bharati Vidyapeeth University, Pune.

== Career ==
=== Debut and early roles (2009–2012) ===
After receiving his L.L.B., Sheikh began working for a law firm, after which he started a career as a photographer. He then went on to do modelling. In 2009, Sheikh made his screen debut with Kya Mast Hai Life. He portrayed Veer, a teenager who loves music opposite Nazneen Ghaani. In 2010, he portrayed Nana Sahib in Jhansi Ki Rani, replacing Satyajeet Dubey.

From 2011 to 2012, Sheikh appeared in Navya..Naye Dhadkan Naye Sawaal, which proved to be his breakthrough. He portrayed Anant, a college student and traditional boy opposite Saumya Seth. The series received positive response and earned him the ITA Award for GR8! Performer of the Year. In 2011, Sheikh also portrayed Ritesh opposite Sheena Bajaj in Best Of Luck Nikki. In 2012, Sheikh appeared in an episode of the telefilm Teri Meri Love Stories opposite Mahhi Vij.

=== Success with Mahabharat and acting in Indonesia (2013–2015) ===
Sheikh's career marked a turning point with Swastik Productions' Mahabharat. From 2013 to 2014, he portrayed Arjuna, the third Pandava opposite Pooja Sharma and Veebha Anand. His chemistry with Sharma was extremely appreciated and became highlight of the show. To prepare for the role, he underwent intense training for almost eight months, including fitness, horse riding and weapons training. Mahabharat was a huge critical and commercial success and earned him nominations for ITA Award for Best Actor – Popular and Indian Telly Award for Best Actor in a Lead Role.

Mahabharat established Sheikh as a popular personality in Indonesia, where he was often credited as the "SRK of the country". This recognition led to Sheikh shifting his focus to a career in Indonesia. In 2014, he hosted Indonesian reality television Panah Asmara Arjuna and a variety show The New Eat Bulaga! Indonesia along with his costars from Mahabharat. In 2015, he co-hosted the television talent show Asia's Got Talent with Marc Nelson. He also featured in a romantic drama, Cinta di Langit Taj Mahal, alongside Nabila Syakieb and Ravi Bhatia as Reehan Syahputra, a calm and composed guy. In 2015, Sheikh landed a lead role in the romantic comedy film Turis Romantis opposite actress Kirana Larasati. He played Azan Khan, a handsome photographer from India who befriended Nabil, a tough and beautiful tourist guide in Yogyakarta.

=== Established actor (2016–2021) ===
Sheikh returned to Indian television in 2016 with Kuch Rang Pyar Ke Aise Bhi, where he portrayed Devrath "Dev" Dixit, a business tycoon opposite Erica Fernandes. Sheikh's performance and his onscreen chemistry with Fernandes was well appreciated, making the series a success. The series had a second season in 2017, where he reprised his role. His performance earned him another nomination for ITA Award for Best Actor – Popular, while he and Fernandes won the Gold Award for Best Onscreen Jodi.

Alongside Kuch Rang Pyar Ke Aise Bhi, he performed in episodic roles and made guest appearances in many Indonesian television series, in 2016. He was seen as Raden Petir in Roro Jonggrang, as Salman in Malaikat Kecil Dari India, as Aladin/Ali Besar in Aladin & Alakadam, as Prince Zamzaman Jinny Oh Jinny Datang Lagi, as Mr. Thakur in Gara Gara Duyung, as Rahul in Tuyul & Mba Yul Reborn and made a guest appearance in I-KTP. In 2016, he also starred opposite Masayu Anastasia in the Indonesian telefilm Namaku Yusuf, playing the titular role of Yusuf.

In 2017, Sheikh began working on an Indonesian feature film Maipa and Datu Museng, an action-based periodic love story in which Sheikh played the role of Datu Museng, a warrior. The film was released on 11 January 2018. From 2018 to 2019, Sheikh portrayed Mughal emperor Salim in Dastaan-E-Mohabbat Salim Anarkali opposite Sonarika Bhadoria.

Sheikh further established his career with Yeh Rishtey Hain Pyaar Ke. From 2019 to 2020, he portrayed Abir, a vagabond opposite Rhea Sharma. Producer Rajan Shahi stated his role was dynamic. The series, his role and chemistry with Sharma received positive response, making it a success. His performance earned him nomination for Gold Award for Best Actor in a Lead Role, while he and Sharma won the Gold Award for Best Onscreen Jodi.

In 2020, Sheikh made his web debut with Paurashpur, portraying a warrior Veer. In 2021, he reprised the role of Devrath in Kuch Rang Pyar Ke Aise Bhi: Nayi Kahaani, the series third season opposite Erica Fernandes. The story progressed from where it left off in the second season. In the same year, he appeared in another web series Pavitra Rishta: Its Never Too Late. He portrayed Manav opposite Ankita Lokhande, a character played by Sushant Singh Rajput, in the original series. The series opened to positive reviews.

=== Career expansion and progression (2022–present) ===
Sheikh started 2022 with the short film Yatri Kripya Dhyan De opposite Shweta Basu Prasad. Rishita Roy Chowdhury stated, "Sheikh plays his part well. His expressions of bewilderment as the journey progresses are convincing." From 2022 to 2023, Sheikh portrayed Krishna, a vlogger who turns responsible following his brother's death in Woh Toh Hai Albelaa opposite Hiba Nawab.

Sheikh expanded to Hindi films in 2024, with Netflix's Do Patti. He portrayed Dhruv, a paragliding company owner and an abusive husband, opposite Kriti Sanon. Rishabh Suri of Hindustan Times noted, "Shaheer has got a meaty role in the film. Menacing as a cold-hearted husband, and just a MCP in general, he makes a well-written character extremely watchable." Vineeta Kumar of India Today stated, "Shaheer's Dhruv is a complete revelation and a testimony of his prowess as a versatile actor. He adds value to the narrative and engages you in the story." It eventually emerged as the most watched Indian web film of the year.

== Other work and public image ==
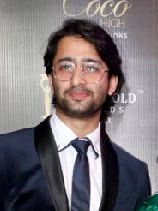
Sheikh in 2019

With his performance in Navya..Naye Dhadkan Naye Sawaal, Mahabharat, Kuch Rang Pyar Ke Aise Bhi and Yeh Rishtey Hain Pyaar Ke, Sheikh established himself among the leading and highest paid actors in Hindi television. In 2014, Sheikh was placed third in Rediff.com's "Best Television Actors" list.

In an interview, Sheikh revealed about how he chooses his projects. He said,

"When it comes to me, I consciously pick up projects where I get to do something different. In my last couple of shows, my characters were very relatable. They even inspired me in my personal life."

Sheikh was named the Times Most Desirable Men on Television in 2017. Subsequently, he was placed 4th in 2018, 3rd in 2019, and 4th in 2020. In its "50 Most Desirable Men" list, he was placed 50th in 2017, 29th in 2019, and 38th in 2020. Sheikh has also appeared in Eastern Eye's 50 Sexiest Asian Men list. He was placed 25th in 2016, 17th in 2018, and 11th in 2019. In August 2018, he was chosen as the first Indian torch bearer of the 18th Asian Games by the Indonesian government. In 2024, he was placed in Hindustan Times's "Best Bollywood Debuts" of the year list. Sheikh has also been a prominent celebrity endorser for several brands and products such as Godrej No. 1 and TVS Motor.

== Personal life ==
After dating for almost two years, Sheikh married Ruchikaa Kapoor on 19 October 2020 in a court wedding, after which they had celebrations in Jammu and Mumbai. Kapoor is the director of Hindi original films on Netflix India. On 9 September 2021, they became parents to a baby girl, Anaya. The couple welcomed another baby girl, Kudrat, on 1 September 2023.

== Filmography ==
Key
†	Denotes films that have not yet been released

=== Films ===
- All films are in Hindi unless otherwise noted.

Year	Title	Role	Notes	Ref.
2015	Turis Romantis	Azan Khan	Indonesian film	
2017	Maipa Deapati & Datu Museng	Datu Museng	Indonesian film	
2022	Yatri Kripya Dhyan De	Sumit	Short film	
2024	Do Patti	Dhruv Sood		

=== Television ===
Year	Title	Role	Notes	Ref.
Indian Television
2005–2006	Sanya	Arjun Shekhawat		
2009–2010	Kya Mast Hai Life	Veer Mehra		
2010	Jhansi Ki Rani	Nana Sahib		
2011–2012	Navya..Naye Dhadkan Naye Sawaal	Anant Bajpai		
2011	Best of Luck Nikki	Ritesh	Season 1	
2012	Teri Meri Love Stories	Nityanand Chaturvedi	Episode 11	
2013–2014	Mahabharat	Arjuna		
2016–2017	Kuch Rang Pyar Ke Aise Bhi	Devrath "Dev" Dixit		
2018–2019	Dastaan-E-Mohabbat Salim Anarkali	Salim		
2019–2020	Yeh Rishtey Hain Pyaar Ke	Abir Rajvansh		
2021	Kuch Rang Pyaar Ke Aise Bhi - Nayi Kahaani	Devrath "Dev" Dixit		
2022–2023	Woh Toh Hai Albelaa	Krishna "Kanha" Choudhary		
2026	108 Base Hospital – Uri	Ved Gupta	Cameo	
Indonesian Television
2014	Panah Asmara Arjuna	Arjuna		
2014	The New Eat Bulaga! Indonesia	Host		
2015	Cinta di Langit Taj Mahal	Rehan Syahputra		
2015	Cinta di Langit Taj Mahal 2	Rehan Syahputra / Revan		
2015	Asia's Got Talent	Host		
2016	Roro Jonggrang	Raden Petir		
2016	Malaikat Kecil Dari India	Salman		
2016	Namaku Yusuf	Yusuf		
2016	Aladin & Alakadam	Aladin / Ali Besar		
2016	Jinny Oh Jinny Datang Lagi	Prince Zamzaman	Episodes 24–25	
2016	Gara Gara Duyung	Mr. Thakur		
2016	Tuyul & Mba Yul Reborn	Rahul		
2017–2018	Malaikat Tak Bersayap	Arya		
2020	Cinta Sejati Selalu Kembali	Devan		
2020	Jika Esok Tak Pernah Ada	Amir		
2020	Cinta Antara Langit Dan Bumi	Kevin Bills		
2023	Bollystar Vacation Hai Albelaa	Host		

=== Web series ===
Year	Title	Role	Notes	Ref.
2020	Paurashpur	Veer Singh	Cameo appearance	
2021	Pavitra Rishta - Its Never Too Late	Manav Deshmukh		
2026	Ab Hoga Hisaab	Bobby Manocha		

=== Music videos ===
Year	Title	Singer(s)	Ref.
2012	Teri Palkey	Reeky Dev	
2018	Sau Fikr	Bishwajit Ghosh	
2020	Ae Mere Dil	Abhay Jodhpurkar	
2020	Je Tu Na Bulave	Surya	
2020	Ab Kya Jaan Legi Meri	Palaash Muchal, Amit Mishra	
2021	Baarish Ban Jaana	Payal Dev, Stebin Ben	
2021	Mera Dil Bhi Kitna Pagal Hai	Mamta Sharma	
2021	Mohabbat Hai	Stebin Ben	
2021	O Dilbar Yaara	Stebin Ben	
2022	Taash De Patte	Bhanu Pandit	
2022	Kya Fark Padta Hai	Dev Negi	
2022	Ve Tu	Sunidhi Chauhan	
2022	Ek Haseena Ne	Ramji Gulati	
2022	Iss Baarish Mein	Yasser Desai, Neeti Mohan	
2022	Main Tenu Chadh Jaungi	Zahrah S Khan	
2022	Runjhun	Vishal Mishra	
2023	Wo Kashish	Javed Ali, Anweshaa	
2023	Barsaat Aa Gayi	Shreya Ghoshal, Stebin Ben	

== Awards and nominations ==
Year	Award	Category	Work	Result	Ref.
2011	Indian Television Academy Awards	GR8! Performer of the Year – Male	Navya..Naye Dhadkan Naye Sawaal	Won	
2014	Indian Telly Awards	Best Actor in a Lead Role	Mahabharat	Nominated	
2014	Gold Awards	Best Actor in a Lead Role	Mahabharat	Nominated	
2014	Indian Television Academy Awards	Best Actor Popular	Mahabharat	Nominated	
2016	Indian Television Academy Awards	Best Actor Popular	Kuch Rang Pyar Ke Aise Bhi	Nominated	
2016	Gold Awards	Best Onscreen Jodi (with Erica Fernandes)	Kuch Rang Pyar Ke Aise Bhi	Nominated	
2016	Asiavision Awards	Star of the Year	Kuch Rang Pyar Ke Aise Bhi	Won	
2017	Gold Awards	Best Onscreen Jodi (with Erica Fernandes)	Kuch Rang Pyar Ke Aise Bhi	Won	
2019	Gold Awards	Best Actor in a Lead Role	Yeh Rishtey Hain Pyaar Ke	Nominated	
2019	Gold Awards	Best Onscreen Jodi (with Rhea Sharma)	Yeh Rishtey Hain Pyaar Ke	Won	
2021	Iconic Gold Awards	Most Trustworthy TV Actor of the Year	—N/a	Won	
2023	Bollywood Hungama Style Icons	Most Stylish TV Actor – Male	—N/a	Nominated	
2023	Indian Telly Awards	Best Actor in a Lead Role	Kuch Rang Pyar Ke Aise Bhi 3	Nominated	
2023	Indian Telly Awards	Best Television Personality of the Year	—N/a	Won	
2025	Iconic Gold Awards	Best Debut Actor – OTT	Do Patti	Won	
