= Kuch Rang Pyar Ke Aise Bhi =

Indian romantic drama television series

- Genre: Romantic Drama
- Created by: Yash A Patnaik
- Written by: Durjoy Datta (Seasons 1 and 2); Mitali Bhattacharya (Seasons 1 and 2); Arundhati Sharma (Seasons 1 and 2); Aparajita Sharma (Dialogues: Season 1 and 2); Divy Nidhi Sharma (Dialogues: Season 1 and 2)
- Screenplay by: Reghuvir Shekhawat; Mitali Bhattacharya; Durjoy Datta
- Story by: Mitali Bhattacharya; Mamta Patnaik
- Directed by: Noel Smith; Prateek Shah; Mahesh Pandey
- Creative director: Shibani Das Gupta
- Presented by: Noel Smith; Prateek Shah; Mahesh Pandey
- Starring: See below
- Voices of: Subhajit Mukherjee; Arpita Mukherjee
- Theme music composer: Adil-Prashant, Arpita Mukherjee
- Opening theme: Badle Se Din Hai, Meri Badli Si Raatein
- Ending theme: Kuch Rang Pyar Ke Aise Bhi
- Country of origin: India
- Original language: Hindi
- No. of seasons: 3
- No. of episodes: 504

Production
- Producers: Yash A Patnaik; Mamata Yash Patnaik
- Cinematography: Dinesh Singh
- Editors: Khandagale; Bhopendra Singh
- Camera setup: Multi-camera
- Running time: 22 minutes
- Production companies: Beyond Dreams Entertainment Pvt Ltd; Inspire Films Pvt Ltd

Original release
- Network: Sony
- Release: 29 February 2016 – 12 November 2021

Kuch Rang Pyar Ke Aise Bhi (transl. There are some colors of love like this too) is an Indian Hindi-language romantic drama television series which aired on 29 February 2016 to 2 November 2017 on Sony TV. It stars Erica Fernandes, Shaheer Sheikh and Supriya Pilgaonkar. The second season of the show aired from 25 September 2017 to 2 November 2017 lasting for 26 episodes. A third season Kuch Rang Pyar Ke Aise Bhi: Nayi Kahaani was aired from 12 July 2021 to 12 November 2021.

== Series overview ==
Season	Episodes	Premiere date	Last Aired
1	388	29 February 2016	24 August 2017
2	26	25 September 2017	2 November 2017
3	90	12 July 2021	12 November 2021

== Plot ==
=== Season 1 ===
Devrath "Dev" Dixit lost his father at a young age and hence his widowed mother, Ishwari brought him and his three sisters up, Neha, Riya and Nikki singlehandedly. Due to unfavorable financial circumstances, Ishwari could only educate Dev and Neha was left at home to take care of Riya and Nikki. Now, Dev, a successful business tycoon, owes everything to his mother and has a feeling of indebtedness and complete devotion for her, and her entire life revolves around him. He has become a workaholic and short tempered as a result of his childhood hardships, but is kind hearted and will go to any extent to help others. Neha, though loves her family, still has resentment in her heart and feels that her mother has done partiality among her children, only educating Dev and depriving her of any opportunities. Dev finds that Ishwari has history of fatigue due to improper nutrition. Dr. Sonakshi "Sona" Bose, Kolkata based, quick-witted, lively young nutritionist, lives with her family in Delhi.

Dev hires Sona to take care of Ishwari's health. Sona and Ishwari develop a friendly bond, and her health improves. Dev and Sonakshi get off on the wrong foot, but they eventually understand each other better. They start dating and fall deeply in love with each other. Dev gradually becomes more cheerful and carefree. When Ishwari learns of their relationship she is heartbroken as she fears that she will be replaced by Sona in Dev's life. When Dev realizes that his mother does not approve of this relationship, he takes a practical decision and decides to part ways, leaving Sona heartbroken. But Dev is unable to forget Sona and descends into a downward spiral. Sona agrees to marry the guy her father chose for her but their engagement is broken off when Sona leaves her fiancé in the middle of her engagement to tend to Dev's wounds. Ishwari realizes that Dev cannot be happy without Sona, and agrees to their marriage. Sona and Dev reconcile and get married.

Dev and Sona settle into their married life, and days pass by. Although Ishwari maintains that she is happy for them, she is still slightly uncomfortable with Sona's presence in Dev's life, and hasn't completely accepted her yet. Dev struggles to balance between his duties as husband and son. Vicky and Radharani create misunderstandings between Sona and Ishwari following which Sona leaves the house. Dev unable to face this leaves the house and goes to the farmhouse where Vicky gets him drunk and cheats him into signing papers, increasing the misunderstandings. Sona begins to lose faith in Dev. She finally meets Dev at the farmhouse where they have an explosive argument. After a bitter exchange of words, Dev and Sona part ways.

==== 7 years later ====
Sona is now a successful businesswoman magnate living in Kolkata with her family and six-year-old daughter Suhana, while Dev becomes a casanova, not knowing that he and Sona have a daughter. She shifts to Delhi for business purposes and unknowingly buys a portion of Dev's office. Eventually, while befriending Suhana as she and his nephew Golu study in the same school, Dev sees her with Sona and finds the truth about her. Dev is overjoyed to know he has a daughter and becomes a loving father to her. Sona and Dev decide to stay in each others' house for one week each for the sake of Suhana's happiness. Sonakshi's brother Saurav marries Ronita. Dev and Sona have a heart to heart talk wherein they admit that they were equally responsible for the failure of their marriage. They forgive each other and are finally able to let go of the bitterness, they held for each other, and become friends. Meanwhile, Ishwari starts liking Sona after saving her from Khatri(a man who had been blackmailing Ishwari by framing her for a crime she did not commit). Ishwari finally lets go of her biased view and starts seeing Sona in a new light. Reflecting on the past, she realizes her mistakes and apologizes to Sona, and finally accepts her as her own daughter. During all this, Dev and Sona realize that they still love each other, and reunite. They learn from their past mistakes and build a stable relationship. Sonakshi helps Dev correcting his mistakes he had done in those seven years and hence brings all the members of the Dixit family back together. She and Dev then find out that Vicky was the main cause for all their misunderstandings, and Dev throws him out of the house. Sonakshi gets pregnant again, and Dev is overjoyed that he gets to relive the journey he missed with Suhana. Vicky, now a changed man, comes back and apologises, and is welcomed back into the family. Sonakshi gives birth to a baby boy named Shubh.

Season 1 ends on a happy note with Sona giving birth to their second child Shubh, with the entire family united.

=== Season 2 ===
This season explores the life of Sona and Dev after the birth of their second child, Shubh. Dev quits his business temporarily to let Sona pursue her dream, much to Ishwari's dismay. It shows Sona a working woman and Dev as a househusband.

The season also focuses on how Dev changes the education pattern of their children's school and how Suhana and Golu fall victim to a dangerous game. It also focuses on Saurabh and Ronita's experience as first-time parents.

Dev then becomes an RJ and the family celebrates his success. Season 2 ends as Shubh says Maa and Papa for the first time.

== Cast ==
=== Main ===
- Erica Fernandes as Dr. Sonakshi Bose Dixit: Asha and Bijoy's daughter; Saurabh's sister; Dev's wife; Suhana and Shubh's mother (2016–2017)
- Shaheer Sheikh as Devrath "Dev" Dixit: Ishwari and Pankaj's son; Neha, Riya and Nikki's brother; Sonakshi's husband; Suhana and Shubh's father (2016–2017)
- Supriya Pilgaonkar as Ishwari Tripathi Dixit: Baldev's sister; Pankaj's widow; Dev, Neha, Riya and Nikki's mother

=== Recurring ===
- Moon Banerjee as Asha Bose: Bijoy's wife; Saurabh and Sonakshi's mother; Suhana, Shubh and Mishti's grandmother(2016–2017)
- Jagat Rawat as Bijoy Bose: Uma Devi's son; Asha's husband; Saurabh and Sonakshi's father;Suhana Shubh and Mishti's grandfather(2016–2017)
- Rina Chakraborty as Uma Devi Bose: Bijoy's mother; Saurabh, Sonakshi and Elena's grandmother; Suhana, Shubh and Mishti's great-grandmother (2016-2017)
- Alia Shah as Suhana "Soha" Dixit: Sonakshi and Dev's daughter; Shubh's sister; Raunak, Aarohi and Mishti's cousin (2017)
- Vidhvaan Sharma as Shubh Dixit: Sonakshi and Dev's son; Suhana's brother; Raunak, Aarohi and Mishti's cousin (2017)
- Vishesh Bansal as Child Devrath "Dev" Dixit (2016)
- Alpesh Dhakan as Saurabh Bose: Bijoy and Asha's son; Sonakshi's brother; Ronita's husband; Mishti's father (2016–2017)
- Khushbu Thakkar as Ronita Mandal Bose: Shankar's daughter; Saurabh's wife; Mishti's mother (2017)
- Mushtaq Khan as Baldev Tripathi: Ishwari's brother; Radha's husband; Vicky's father; Raunak's grandfather (2016–2017)
- Alka Mogha as Radha Tripathi: Baldev's wife; Vicky's mother; Raunak's grandmother (2016–2017)
- Prerna Panwar as Elena Bose Tripathi: Saurabh and Sonakshi's cousin; Vicky's wife; Raunak's mother (2016–2017)
- Vaibhav Singh as Vikram "Vicky" Tripathi: Radha and Baldev's son; Dev, Neha, Riya and Nikki's cousin; Elena's husband; Raunak's father (2016–2017)
- Pragyaj Jain as Raunak "Golu" Tripathi: Vicky and Elena's son; Suhana, Aarohi and Shubh's cousin (2017)
- Chestha Bhagat as Neha Dixit: Ishwari and Pankaj's eldest daughter; Dev, Riya and Nikki's sister; Vicky's cousin; Ranveer's wife (2016–2017)
- Ankita Bahuguna as Riya Dixit: Ishwari and Pankaj's second daughter; Dev, Neha and Nikki's sister; Vicky's cousin; Kapil's wife; Aarohi's mother (2016-2017)
- Aashika Bhatia as Nikki Dixit: Ishwari and Pankaj's youngest daughter; Dev, Neha and Riya's sister; Vicky's cousin; Lakshya's love interest (2016–2017)
- Arjun Aneja as Ranveer: Neha's first husband (2016-2017)
- Ashwini Kaul as Lakshya: Nikki's love interest (2017)
- Roop Durgapal as Natasha Gujral: Harish's daughter; Dev's ex-fiancée and business partner (2016-2017)
- Hemant Choudhary as Dr. Jaideep Sinha: Sonakshi's former boss (2016)
- Jay Soni as Dr. Ritwick Sen: Naveen's son; Sonakshi's ex-fiancé (2016)
- Pankaj Kalra as Naveen Sen: Ritwick's father (2016)
- Pawan Chopra as Harish Gujral: Natasha's father (2016)
- Karmveer Choudhary as Brijesh Khatri: Ishwari's colleague and blackmailer (2016-2017)
- Ankit Gupta as Jatin Roy: Sonakshi's childhood friend and business partner (2017)
- Anju Jadhav / Ekroop Bedi as Tina Singhal: Dev's secretary (2016)
- Mohit Sinha as Bunty Makhija: Dev's friend (2016)
- Ashiesh Roy as Shankar Mandal: Ronita's father (2017)
- Jhumma Mitra as Tara Mandal: Ronita's mother (2017)
- Asma Badar as Nisha: Dev's former fiancée (2017)
- Udit Gaur as Neil Lakhotia: famous business tycoon, Sonakshi's dummy boyfriend
- Sapan Gulati as Raman: Ishwari and Laksha's office colleague
- Amita Udgata as Dadi Bua
- Romit Sharma as Kushal Roy
- Arpit Chaudhary as Ayaan Vaishisth (Riya's former marriage alliance)
- Satveer Saini (2017)

== Soundtrack ==
Soundtrack of the show were composed by Adil-Prasant. Songs were sung by Subhajit Mukherjee and Arpita Mukherjee. On 10 February 2017 the channel released a compilation of show's romantic songs on YouTube as Valentine's Day special. "Tu Mujhme Mujhse Zyaada Hai (Duet)" is one of the "Most Romantic Hindi Title Songs" among the shows telecasted by the channel.

Original Songs
No.	Title	Length
1.	"Ye Lamhe Hazar Se"	3:17
2.	"Rang Rahi Hoon Ye Kaise Rang Mein"	1:33
3.	"Badle Se Din Hai Meri Badli Se Raatein (Duet)"	5.39
4.	"Badle Se Din Hai Meri Badli Se Raatein (Female)"	2:08
5.	"Badle Se Din Hai Meri Badli Se Raatein (Male)"	2:10
6.	"Tu Mujhme Mujhse Zyaada Hai (Male)"	2:17
7.	"Tu Mujhme Mujhse Zyaada Hai (Female)"	2:28
8.	"Tu Mujhme Mujhse Jyada Hai (Duet)"	3:49
9.	"Kismat Ke Lekhe Kisne Dekhe (KRPKAB SAD)"	3:59
10.	"Waqt Ne Kiya Kya Haseen Sitam (Duet)" (Recreated by music directors Adil-Prashant)	2:30
11.	"Thodi Si Teri Zimmedari (Season 02)"	3:05
12.	"Kyun Iss Dafa Tu Mujhse Yun Khafaa Hain"	1:09

== Awards and nominations ==
Year	Award	Category	Nominee	Result	Ref
2016	Gold Awards	Best Female Debut	Erica Fernandes	Nominated	
2016	Gold Awards	Best Supporting Actress	Supriya Pilgaonkar	Nominated	
2016	Gold Awards	Best Onscreen Jodi	Shaheer Sheikh and Erica Fernandes	Nominated	
2016	Gold Awards	Best Television Show	Inspire Films	Nominated	
2016	Asiavision Awards	Star Of The Year	Shaheer Sheikh	Won	
2016	Asian Viewers Television Awards	Soap of the Year	Kuch Rang Pyaar Ke Aise Bhi	Won	
2016	Asian Viewers Television Awards	Female Actor of the Year	Erica Fernandes	Won	
2016	Asian Viewers Television Awards	Male Actor of the Year	Shaheer Sheikh	Nominated	
2016	Indian Television Academy Awards	Best Actor (Popular)	Shaheer Sheikh	Nominated	
2016	Indian Television Academy Awards	Best Actress in a Negative Role	Alka Mogha	Nominated	
2017	Gold Awards	Best Onscreen Jodi	Shaheer Sheikh and Erica Fernandes	Won	
2017	Indian Television Academy Awards	Best Supporting Actress	Supriya Pilgaonkar	Nominated	
2018	Indian Television Academy Awards	Best Actor - Drama	Shaheer Sheikh	Nominated	
2018	Indian Television Academy Awards	Best Supporting Actress	Supriya Pilgaonkar	Nominated	
2018	Asian Viewers Television Awards	Female Actor Of The Year	Erica Fernandes	Nominated	
2023	Indian Telly Awards	Best Actor	Shaheer Sheikh	Nominated	
2023	Indian Telly Awards	Best Supporting Actress	Supriya Pilgaonkar	Won	
