= RadhaKrishn =

Indian television series

- Genre: Mythology; Drama
- Created by: Siddharth Kumar Tewary
- Developed by: Siddharth Kumar Tewary
- Written by: Mahesh Pandey; Utkarsh Naithani; Swapnil Deshpande; Dilip Jha; Vinod Sharma
- Directed by: Siddharth Kumar Tewary; Loknath Pandey; Madan; Kamal Monga
- Creative director: Nitin Mathura Gupta
- Starring: Sumedh Mudgalkar; Mallika Singh; Basant Bhatt
- Narrated by: Saurabh Raj Jain
- Opening theme: RadhaKrishn – song
- Ending theme: Krishnvani by Krishna (Sumedh Mudgalkar)
- Composers: Surya Raj Kamal; Jitesh Panchal
- Country of origin: India
- Original language: Hindi
- No. of seasons: 4
- No. of episodes: 1157

Production
- Executive producer: Siddharth Kumar Tewary
- Producers: Siddharth Kumar Tewary; Gayatri Gill Tewary
- Editor: Paresh Shah
- Camera setup: multi-camera
- Running time: 22 - 23 minutes
- Production company: Swastik Productions
- Budget: ₹150 crore

Original release
- Network: Star Bharat
- Release: 1 October 2018 – 21 January 2023

RadhaKrishn is an Indian Hindi-language television drama series that premiered on 1 October 2018 on Star Bharat and is also digitally available on Disney+ Hotstar. After a successful run of more than 5 years, it went off the air on 21 January 2023. The series is a fictionalised version based on the life of Hindu deities Radha and Krishna. It is produced by Siddharth Kumar Tewary, Rahul Kumar Tewary and Gayatri Gill Tewary for Swastik Productions and is directed by Rahul Kumar Tewary. The roles of Krishna and Radha are played by Sumedh Mudgalkar and Mallika Singh. It completed 1145 episodes and is listed among longest running television series of India and also became the longest ran religious series. It is also the longest running drama series on Star Bharat to date.

A prequel of RadhaKrishn, titled Jai Kanhaiya Lal Ki, was telecast from 19 October 2021 to 4 July 2022.

== Plot ==
=== Chapter 1: Radha-Krishn's teenage ===
Krishn's devotee, Sridama curses Radha-Lakshmi in Goloka to forget Krishn for 100 years and live on Earth. This was a part of cosmic play as it was time for Krishn-Vishnu to make his entry into the mortal world to save Bhudevi from evil. Radha and Krishna are reborn in Barsana and Mathura respectively.

Krishn is destined to kill his evil maternal uncle, Kansa. Meanwhile, Ayan, Radha's friend loves Radha and he tries to separate Radha from Krishn. Krishn defeats Vyomasura, a demon whose marriage was fixed with Radha. Krishn removes all humanly weaknesses like bhaya (fear), moha (greed), krodha (anger),irshya (envy), ahankara (pride), grihna (hatred) and heenbhavna (lack of self-confidence) out of Radha. In the process, she becomes closer to Krishn but is forced to marry Ayan. Later she realises that this marriage is merely an illusion as she can't marry anyone except Krishna because she is the incarnation of Lakshmi and Krishn is none other than Vishnu, Lakshmi's consort. Radha understands that her marriage is fake and eternally, she is Krishn's consort after Brahma completes Brahma Kalyāna (heavenly wedding) of Radha and Krishn in Goloka.

Ugrasena is crowned king. Now, Krishn, Balarama and the Yadavas move to Dwaraka, their new home. Balarama marries Revati (Jyotishmati) in her earlier life, who loved Balarama as Shesha. Elsewhere, Krishn marries Rukmini. Later, Krishna also marries Satyabhama and Jambavati. He then kills the evil Narakasura and his general Mura.

=== Chapter 2: Mahabharata ===
The Pandavas have escaped the lac-palace incident which was organised by their evil cousins – the Kauravas, headed by Duryodhana and his brother Dushasana, their uncle Shakuni and Duryodhana's friend Karna. He helps Panchala king Drupada arrange a Swayamvara for his daughter Draupadi, who was born from a yajna. The third Pandava prince Arjuna wins Draupadi's svayamvara and marries her, however circumstances force Draupadi to marry all five Pandavas. The Pandavas receive a new kingdom Indraprastha, faraway from Hastinapura due to the conflict with the Kauravas.

Krishn's sister Subhadra elopes with Arjuna, whereas Krishn kills the Pundra king Paundraka Vasudeva, an impostor. The second Pandava Bhima also kills the Magadha king Jarasandha. Pandavas soon perform Rajasuya Yagna where they gain supremacy over all of Aryavarta, where Krishn's cousin Shishupala interrupts the ceremony, only to be killed by Krishn. Later, Duryodhana organises a dice game with Shakuni wherein Pandavas lose all their wealth and are humiliated, while Krishna saves Draupadi from getting disrobed in the court by Dushasana. Later, the Pandavas and Draupadi are exiled for 13 years. Upon their return starts the Kurukshetra War, where Arjuna receives from Krishn, the knowledge of Bhagavad Gita. Shikhandi (who got a boon from Lord Shiva to kill Bhishma in her previous birth as Amba) kills Bhishma. Dhrishtadyumna kills Dronacharya, Arjuna kills Karna. Sahadeva kills Shakuni, whereas Bhima kills all the 100 Kauravas, with the war ending with the death of Duryodhana. Gandhari curses Krishn that the Yadava clan will be similarly destroyed. On the other hand, Krishn turns Ayan into a better person.

=== Chapter 3: Punarmilan ===
Krishn returns to Dwaraka. Pradyumna returns to Dwaraka and marries Rukmavati, and a son Aniruddha is born to them. To Jambavati and Krishn, a son Samba is born, who is termed to be the reason for the Yadava destruction as cursed by Gandhari. Samba grows up to be short-tempered but loves his family, especially his mother; however, he hates Radha. Later, Samba, Aniruddha, and Balaram's sons Nishath and Ulmuk are sent to Gurukula along with Radha and return after a few years, as teens.

Aniruddha is kept in captivity at Shonitapura, the kingdom of Banasura, by his daughter Usha. This soon results in a war between Krishn and Banasura, wherein Shiva has to fight for Banasura due to his boon, resulting in a faceoff between Krishn and Shiva. Krishn defeats Shiva and punishes Banasura for kidnapping his grandson. Soon, Aniruddha is married to Usha while Samba is married to Hastinapur's Kaurava princess, Lakshmanaa, Duryodhana and Bhanumati's daughter. As Samba had previously joined hands with Banasura, he is cursed with leprosy by Krishn.

When Samba steals the Siamantak mani, Dwarka is plunged into darkness. With Samba praying to the moon, and Radha praying to the sun. This leads to Samba being cursed by Ganesha. Later, Radha helps him recover.

Because of Samba's evil ploy, Radha loses her memory. Krishn shows her their childhood memories and she eventually remembers him.

When Krishn ends up disrupting Bali's yagya, he is forced to declare his end. Radha, disturbed by this, get the boon of dying before Krishn from Saraswati.

Samba tricks Yamuna into awakening Shani. However, even his Vakra Drishti has a positive effect on Radha and Krishn.

Radha and Krishn then play Dwarka's Last holi.

Shankhchuda (rebirth of Sridama) enters the story and has a loving wife, Tulasi, who is his strength but he only uses her. With the help of Tulasi and her devotion to him, Shankhchuda got immense strength and he vows to destroy the whole universe. Krishn disguises himself as Shankhchuda and goes to Tulasi to break her devotion. After Shankhchuda is killed, Tulasi feels cheated. She curses Krishn to become a stone (sālagrāma). Radha enables Banke Bihari. He helps Tulasi realise the truth.

However, Tulasi realizes her mistake after she remembers her past. She decides to take her curse back and transforms herself into a Tulasi plant. She then marries Krishn in this form and is told to remain on earth in that form. This displays Tulasi Kalyāna (Tulsi's wedding). Krishn kills Dantavakra

Consequently, Hanuman visits Dwarka and witnesses Rama, Lakshmana, and Sita in Krishn, Balarama, and Radha respectively. He gets to know that Krishn and Radha were Rama and Sita in their previous birth and they in turn, are none other than Vishnu and Lakshmi.

When Alakshmi arrives at Dwarka to claim Krishn, she is defeated by the Mahalakshmi in Radha.

Lord Shiva suggests that Krishn should perform the Ashwamedh Yagya, for which he would need someone as his consort (ardhāngini). Krishn chooses Rukmini to sit with him for the yajna; to this his other queens object, claiming that they are equally eligible for sitting with him. Narada advised performing Tulabhara (balancing) in order to find the perfect consort for Krishn. On the weighing scale, Krishn is in one balance and the other queens have to put their jewellery to win Krishn. Rukmini arrives and places a pair of bangles gifted by Krishn and a tulasi leaf, and wins him upon balancing the scale. However everyone realizes Radha is the perfect ardhangini to Krishn, the yagya is called off.

Bal Ganesh is brought back, according to Parvati's wish. He steals the Sudarshan chakra. Later he writes the Mahabharata in partnership with Vyasa. Ganesh returns the Chakra and also defeats Mohasur.

After Krishn's 100th Janmashtami (birthday), the time finally comes, when Sridama's curse comes to an end and Radha remembers everything about Goloka and her true identity as a goddess and the consort of Krishn. However, after Krishn refuses to go to Goloka immediately, Radha ends their relationship of love on Earth. But she reinstates it on Radhashtami, after some convincing.

Radha dreams about Jara killing Krishn. All her efforts to keep them away from each other fail. Krishn ends up teaching Jara archery. Jara then fades out of the story.

Radha kills Kaptasur, Shalva's accomplice, and Krishn's lookalike, after she realizes his evilness. Afterward, Vidhurath, brother of Dantavakra, tries to kill Radha but gets executed by Krishn's Sudarshana Chakra.

Later, Samba insults Rishi Durvasa in disguise, only to get cursed to be the cause of the Yadava tribe's destruction. Nishath is manipulated by Shukracharya, and Musal is created with all of Samba's hate. Samba takes a turn for the better. Shalva kills Pradyumna. He is killed by Krishn. Pradyumna is resurrected. Romharshan is killed by Balaram.

Radha and Krishn visit Vrindavan. Nrigasur is liberated and Balaram kills Dwividh.

Hans is a demon who marries off youngsters against their wish. When Radha protests, he lusts for her and agrees to stop it if she marries him. Radha agrees. However she puts the condition that he must weigh her in gold. Hans fails to do so. When he abducts Radha, Krishn breaks Mahadev's boon and kills Hans. To settle the fight, Krishna narrates the story of Bhasmasur. Mahadev accepts his fault.

Vishnu has returned to Vaikuntha, however, there is still unrest on Earth. Narada asks some sages who should be worthy of accepting a sacrificial offering. Many say it should be Brahma or Vishnu or Shiva. Narada asks Bhrigu to visit the three gods. Bhrigu visits Brahma, but he is engrossed by the music played by his wife Saraswati. Bhrigu grows impatient and curses him to never be worshipped on Earth. Bhrigu visits Shiva, only to find him spending time with Parvati. Bhrigu curses Shiva to be worshipped as a lingam by all on Earth. Bhrigu visits Vishnu but is dismayed to see Lakshmi massaging his feet, actually out of love for her husband. Bhrigu stamps the sleeping Vishnu on his chest. Vishnu then massages Bhrigu's foot and shuts his third arrogant eye. Bhrigu realises his mistake and asks for repentance while asking him to accept the offering. Mahalakshmi curses the entire Brahman community to become penniless. Vishnu agrees and sees a crying Lakshmi. Lakshmi condemns Vishnu, saying that Bhrigu stamped on his chest, Lakshmi's second abode (vakshasthala), thereby indirectly insulting Lakshmi too. She leaves Vaikuntha and is reborn as Bhargavi, the daughter of Bhrigu. He knows her divine truth, and confines her to the house so that she will never meet her Narayan as he is scared that Vishnu will come and take Bhargavi away.

Narayan arrives as Srinivas. He poses as a dance teacher to the local princess, Padmavathi. He also starts teaching Bhargavi dance. Srinivas and Bhargavi fall in love. He promises her that they will marry with her father's consent.Padmavathi also falls in love with Srinivas and she is blissfully unaware of Srinivas's love for Bhargavi. Bhrigu intends to marry off Bhargavi to Vasu, Padmavathi's evil brother.

In a turn of events, Srinivas takes away Padmavathi from her swayamvar, after which Srinivas reveals his love to Padmavathi. However, Padmavathi is adamant, and Srinivas is forced to marry her, against his wish. This leads to Bhargavi leaving Venkatgiri forever. She goes all the way to Karvipur. She faces many challenges there. As Srinivas cannot meet Bhargavi directly, he and Govindraj (his brother) disguise themselves as Venkatesh and his wife Bharya. They make Bhargavi realise her love for both Srinivas as well as Venkatesh. When Kohlasur attacks them, Bhargavi becomes Devi Ambabai and kills him. After this, Shrinivas reveals his swaroop and the Tirumala temple is established, with Padmavathi becoming Alamelu Manga.

Radha-Krishn and Lakshmi-Narayan come out of the dream. They then face Shadripu.

Vyasa presents the Mahabharata, but it lacks Prem-bhakti rasa. So, Vyasa starts working on Srimad Bhagavatam. Meanwhile, to help Rishi Garg compose Garg Samhita, Radha, Krishn and Balram go back in time and relive their childhood. When they come back to the present, Radha returns to Golok, the Yadav fratricidal war starts. Everyone dies in the war. Balaram takes jal samadhi, Dwarka is drowned and Jara fulfills his destiny of killing Krishn. Radha and Krishn reunite in Golok. The show ends with a maharaas.

== Cast ==
=== Main ===
- Sumedh Mudgalkar as Krishna / Vishnu / Matsya / Kurma / Varaha / Narasimha / Vamana / Parashurama / Rama / Mohini / Gopala-Krishna / Govind Dev / Madhava / Manmohan / Banke Bihari / Paundraka / Achyuta / Srinivas / Venkatesh (2018–2023)
  - Runav Shah / Hazel Gaur as young Krishna (2018–2020) / (2022)
- Mallika Singh as Radha / Mahalakshmi / Sita / Bhumi / Ashta Lakshmi / Alakshmi / Shitala /Kolhapur Mahalakshmi / Madhavi / Vallabh / Kishori / Bhargavi (2018–2023)
  - Myra Rajpal as young Radha (2018–2020)
- Basant Bhatt as Balarama / Lakshmana / Shesha / Baldevi / Ananga Manjari / Govindraja / Bharya (2018–2023)

=== Recurring ===
- Himanshu Soni as Krishna of Goloka (2018)
- Shivya Pathania as Radha of Goloka (2018)
- Tarun Khanna as Shiva / Hanuman (2018–2023)
- Piyali Munsi as Parvati / Sati / Siddhidatri / Durga /Mahakali / Bhadrakali (2018–2023)
- Zalak Desai as Rukmini / Lakshmi /Padmavathi (2019–2023)
- Nisha Nagpal / Shalini Vishnudev as Saraswati (2020–2021) / (2021–2023)
- Amardeep Garg as Brahma (2018–2023)
- Kumar Hegde as Narada (2018–2023)
- Raman Thukral as Ganesha (2019–2023)
- Kunal Bakshi / Manish Bishla / Meer Ali as Indra (2019) / (2019–2022) / (2022–2023)
- Jiten Bisht as Varuna
- Sunil Bhargav as Surya (2020-2022)
- Himanshu Bamzai as Yama (2020)
- Aahil Khan as Vayu (2020)
- Abhishek Mishra & Akash Mishra as Ashwini Kumars (2020)
- Raj Logani as Shani (2021)
- Harsh Vashisht as Sridama of Goloka, Demon Shankhachur (2018–2023)
- Raja Kapse as Ugrasena (2018–2020)
- Falaq Naaz as Devaki (2018–2023)
- Naveen Jinger as Vasudeva (2018–2023)
- Arpit Ranka as Kansa (2018–2023)
- Gavie Chahal as Nanda Baba (2018–2019; 2022)
- Reena Kapoor / Aditi Sajwan as Yashoda (2018–2019) / (2022–2023)
- Vasundhara Kaul as Rohini Devi (2018–2019)
- Rakesh Kukreti as Vrishabhanu (2018–2019) / (2022–2023)
- Akangsha Rawat as Kirtida (2018–2019) /(2022–2023)
- Nimai Bali as Ugrapath (2018–2020)
- Malini Sengupta as Jatila (2018–2020)
- Rushiraj Pawar as Ayan (2018–2020)
- Harsha Khandeparkar as Kutila (2019–2020)
- Tinu Verma as Jarasandha (2020)
- Saif Ullah Rahmani as Kalyavana / Dhritarashtra (2020)
- Monika Chauhan / Kanchan Dubey as Revati (2019–2021) / (2021–2023)
- Vaidehi Nair / Manisha Saxena as Jambavati (2020) / (2020–2021)
- Aleya Ghosh as Satyabhama (2020–2021)
- Kajol Srivastav as Kalindi (2021)
- Joohi Pal as Mitravinda (2021)
- Nishi Saxena as Nagnajiti or Satya (2021)
- Payal Gupta as Bhadra (2021)
- Neha Tiwari as Lakshmana or Charuhasini (2021)
- Aanchal Goswami / Nikita Tiwari as Subhadra (2020) / (2021–2022)
- Kunwar Vikram Soni / Kunal Gaud as Pradyumna (2020) / (2021-2022)
- Kartikey Malviya as Samba (2020–2023)
  - Arpan Das as young Samba (2020)
- Tisha Kapoor as Lakshmanaa (2020–2022)
- Bhavesh Balchandani / Saurav Singh as Aniruddha (2020) / (2021–2022)
- Prapti Shukla as Usha (2020)
- Muskan Verma as Chitralekha (2020)
- Priya Thanki as Lalita Sakhi (2018–2019), (2022-2023)
- Tanishq Seth as Vishakha (2018-2019), (2022-2023)
- Harsh Mehta as Nishatha (2020–2022)
- Devesh Sharma as Ulmuka (2020–2022)
- Preeti Verma as Chandravali (2019)
- Mukul Raj Singh as Govardhan (2019)
- Rajesh Chahar as Subal (2018–2019)
- Richa Rathore as Rukmavati (2020)
- Ashwin Patil as Damma (2018–2019)
- Via Roy Choudhury as Gandhari (2020)
- Resha Konkar as Kunti (2020)
- Kanan Malhotra as Yudhishthira (2020)
- Zuber Ali as Bhima (2020)
- Kinshuk Vaidya as Arjuna (2020)
- Ujjwal Sharma as Nakula (2020)
- Vikas Singh as Sahadeva (2020)
- Manoj Jaiswal as Drupada (2020)
- Ishita Ganguly as Draupadi (2020)
- Kamaljeet Rana as Dhrishtadyumna (2020)
- Krip Suri as Duryodhana (2020)
- Ankit Gulati as Dushasana (2020)
- Malhar Pandya as Karna (2020)
- Sachin Verma as Bhishma (2020)
- Anant V Joshi as Virata (2020)
- Hemant Choudhary as Drona (2020)
- Sai Ballal as Shakuni (2020)
- Vinit Kakar as Shishupala / Garuda /Takshaka / Svarbhanu (2020)
- Ansha Sayed as Shikhandi (2020)
- Saurabh Raj Jain as Narrator (2018)
- Pooja Sharma as Yogmaya (2018)
- Sumedh Mudgalkar as Shuka (2019–2020)
- Chetan Hansraj as Ravana (2019)
- Rajeev SP as Vibhishana
- Harsh Vashisht as Shankhachuda (2021)
- Puneet Vashisht as Bhasmasura (2022)
- Meghan Jadhav as Vyomasur (2019)
- Deepak Bhatia as Shukracharya (2018–2022)
- Jiten Lalwani as Maharishi Bhrigu (2022)
- Namrata Kapoor as Khyati (2022)
- Pratik Parihar as Prince Vasu (2022)
- Ganesh Pai as Hans (2022)
- Avit Shetty as Gayasura (2022)

== Soundtrack ==
The original music of the series is composed by Surya Raj Kamal with the background score by Jitesh Panchal and Sushant Pawar. Lyrics are penned by Shekhar Astitwa, Neetu Pandey Kranti, Vikas Chauhan, Dr. Kannan, and others. The shlokas, mantras, and excerpts from various Hindu mythology scriptures and texts like Bhagavata Purana and Brahma Vaivarta Purana have been transformed into various themes. Popular devotional songs like Shri Krishna Govind Hare Murari, Govind Bolo Hari Gopal Bolo, and Bolo Jai Kanhaiya Lal Ki have also been recreated. Some shlokas, bhajans, songs, and background music from Swastik's another magnum opus series Mahabharat are also used in the series. Surya Raj Kamal has composed more than 20 original compositions for Raasleela of Radha-Krishn. Star Bharat in December 2018 uploaded a video consisting of 14 songs from the series till that date.

Tracklisting
No.	Title	Lyrics	Music	Singer(s)	Length
1.	"Krishn Hai Vistar Yadi (Title Song)"	Shekhar Astitwa	Surya Raj Kamal	Bharat Kamal, Gul Saxena
2.	"Tum Prem Ho" (Solo, Duet, and Sad Versions)	Shekhar Astitwa	Surya Raj Kamal	Mohit Lalwani, Aishwarya Anand
3.	"Tum Bina Main Kuch Nahi"	Shekhar Astitwa	Surya Raj Kamal	Mohit Lalwani, Gul Saxena
4.	"Kya Ho Raha" (Solo, Duet, and Sad Versions)	Shekhar Astitwa	Surya Raj Kamal	Aishwarya Anand, Mohit Lalwani
5.	"O Kanha O Krishna"	Shekhar Astitwa	Surya Raj Kamal	Aishwarya Anand
6.	"Bina Krishn Ke Radha Kahan"	Shekhar Astitwa	Surya Raj Kamal	Aishwarya Anand, Mohit Lalwani
7.	"Prem Milan"	Neetu Pandey Kranti	Jitesh Panchal	Krishn Beura
8.	"Param Premmay Radhika" (Golok Maharaas Version)	Shekhar Astitwa	Surya Raj Kamal	Mohit Mishra, Gul Saxena
9.	"Punarchandra Ujjwal Nisha" (Vrindavan Maharaas Version)	Shekhar Astitwa	Surya Raj Kamal	Mohit Mishra, Gul Saxena
10.	"Kanha Ki Dhun Pe Aaj" (Purnima Maharaas (Gopeshwar Mahadev Maharaas Version))	Vikas Chauhan	Surya Raj Kamal	Mohit Mishra, Gul Saxena, Jitesh Panchal, Sushant Pawar, Chetan Sharma, Jolly Dasgupta (Chorus)
11.	"Rang Prem Ka Chadhe" (Gopadevi Raas Version)	Vikas Chauhan	Surya Raj Kamal	Mohit Mishra, Gul Saxena
12.	"Jahan Jahan Radhe Wahan" (Holi Maharaas Version)	Shekhar Astitwa	Surya Raj Kamal	Abdul Shaikh, Aishwarya Anand, Gul Saxena
13.	"Kanha Ke Adharan Dhari Bansuri" (Holi Version)	Shekhar Astitwa	Surya Raj Kamal	Abdul Shaikh
14.	"Bansuri Krishn Ki Baajegi" (Vivaah Maharaas Version)	Shekhar Astitwa	Surya Raj Kamal, Traditional	Abdul Shaikh
15.	"Radha Ke Sang Chhedkhani Kare"	Shekhar Astitwa	Surya Raj Kamal	Abdul Shaikh
16.	"Bholi Bhali Radhe Ko"	Shekhar Astitwa	Surya Raj Kamal	Various Artists
17.	"Phoolon Wali Holi Mein" (Phoolon Ki Holi Version)	Neeti Pandey Kranti	Jitesh Panchal	Jitesh Panchal, Sushant Pawar, Chetan Sharma, Jolly Dasgupta (Chorus)
18.	"Paane Ko Hi Prem Kare"	Shekhar Astitwa	Surya Raj Kamal	Puran Shiva
19.	"Radha Theme"	Shekhar Astitwa	Surya Raj Kamal	Randeep Bhaskar
20.	"Shringar Chandra – Panchnaad Panchroop"	Vinod Sharma	Surya Raj Kamal	Gul Saxena
21.	"Koi Kahe Kanha"	Neetu Pandey Kranti	Jitesh Panchal	Jitesh Panchal, Sushant Pawar, Chetan Sharma, Jolly Dasgupta (Chorus)
22.	"Sab Utsav Aaj"	Neetu Pandey Kranti	Lenin Nandi	Rinku Giri
23.	"Saathi Aao Re"	Shekhar Astitwa	Surya Raj Kamal	Various Artists
24.	"Radha-Krishna Arti"	Dr. Kannan, Traditional	Jitesh Panchal	Jitesh Panchal, Sushant Pawar, Chetan Sharma, Jolly Dasgupta (Chorus)
25.	"O Maiya Mori"	Shekhar Astitwa	Surya Raj Kamal	Swaty Nandi
26.	"Aaya Govinda" (Janmashtami Maharaas Version)	Shekhar Astitwa	Surya Raj Kamal	Abdul Shaikh, Jolly Dasgupta
27.	"Bholi Bhali Radha Ko Sataye"	Shekhar Astitwa	Surya Raj Kamal	Abdul Shaikh, Aishwarya Anand
28.	"Treta Ho Ya Dwapar Ho"	Neetu Pandey Kranti	Surya Raj Kamal	Mohit Mishra
29.	"Dwarkapati Se" (Krishna Sudama Milan Song)	Shekhar Astitwa	Jitesh Panchal	Mohit Mishra, Rohit Shastri
30.	"Shyam Mein Hai Radha"	Shekhar Astitwa	Surya Raj Kamal	Puran Shiva
31.	"Hori Re Rasiya" (Holi Maharaas – Dwarka Antim Holi)	Shekhar Astitwa	Surya Raj Kamal	Abdul Sheikh, Supriya Joshi
32.	"Bol Kaise Kanhaiya Rijhaye Radhe" (Mela Maharaas - RadhaKrishn 2.0 First Maharaas)	Ravi Chopras	Bharat Kamal	Mohit Lalwani, Prateeksha Srivastava
33.	"Tum hi tum ho mujh mein he Radhe" (Milan song - RadhaKrishn 2.0)	Ravi Chopra	Bharat Kamal	Mohit Lalwani, Aishwarya Anand

== Production ==
=== Development ===
The series is one of the most expensive series on Indian Television as ₹150 crore is said to have been spent by Swastik Productions. Shooting took place in Umargam (Umbergaon), a suburb in Gujarat, India. The series was mainly shot in front of a green/blue screen. Shibhapriya Swas is the set and costume designer who was inspired from their descriptions in scriptures, as well as different paintings. Surya Raj Kamwas is the music director of the show who composed various themes. There were approximately 500 members of the crew.

=== Casting ===
In 2017, Chahat Pandey was first cast as the lead Radha opposite Sumedh Mudgalkar while Madirakshi Mundle and Siddharth Arora as Goloka RadhaKrishna. They also starred in the show's first teaser, however, were replaced by Mallika Singh, Shivya Pathania and Himanshu Soni due to creative differences.

=== Shooting ===
the show’s crew of 180 people were stranded at the show’s shoot location Umargam from March till May 2020 due to COVID-19 lockdown in India.

== Reception ==
In the first week of December 2018, it was at fifth position with 6.6 million impressions.

== Prequel ==
A prequel show was launched, highlighting the early days of Lord Krishna. It was titled as Jai Kanhaiya Lal Ki and premiered on 19 October 2021 and ended on 4 July 2022.
