= Jai Kanhaiya Lal Ki (2021 TV series) =

Indian mythological television series

- Genre: Mythology; Drama
- Created by: Siddharth Kumar Tewary
- Developed by: Siddharth Kumar Tewary
- Written by: Mahesh Pandey; Utkarsh Naithani; Swapnil Deshpande; Dilip Jha; Vinod Sharma
- Directed by: Siddharth Kumar Tewary; Loknath Pandey; Madan; Kamal Monga
- Creative director: Nitin Mathura Gupta
- Starring: Sumedh Mudgalkar; Mallika Singh; Hazel Gaur; Gaurav Pareek; Aditi Sajwan; Arpit Ranka; Basant Bhatt; Tarun Khanna; Piyali Munshi; Shalini Vishnudev; Gavie Chahal; Falaq Naaz; Naveen Jinger
- Narrated by: Sumedh Mudgalkar
- Opening theme: Haathi Ghoda Paalki, Jai Kanhaiya Lal Ki by Kailash Kher
- Composers: Surya Raj Kamal, Jitesh Panchal
- Country of origin: India
- Original language: Hindi
- No. of episodes: 185

Production
- Executive producer: Siddharth Kumar Tewary
- Producers: Siddharth Kumar Tewary; Gayatri Gill Tewary
- Editor: Paresh Shah
- Camera setup: Multi-camera
- Running time: 22 minutes
- Production company: Swastik Productions

Original release
- Network: Star Bharat
- Release: 19 October 2021 – 4 July 2022

Related
- RadhaKrishn

Jai Kanhaiya Lal Ki (transl. Hail Lord Krishna) is an Indian Hindi-language television mythological drama series that premiered on 19 October 2021 on Star Bharat. It is also digitally available on Disney+ Hotstar. A prequel of RadhaKrishn, the show stars Hazel Gaur, Sumedh Mudgalkar, Mallika Singh, Arpit Ranka and Aditi Sajwan. The series ended on 4 July 2022.

== Synopsis ==
The series traces the childhood of Lord Krishna and his strong bond with his foster mother, Yashoda. Lord Krishna's adventures, fondness for butter (makhan), and his love for both of his mothers, Devaki and Yashoda, form the crux of the story. It also features his power and strength of standing against the wrong and protecting his family and village people against his maternal uncle, the evil Kamsa.

== Cast ==
=== Main ===
- Hazel Gaur as Krishna: Lord Vishnu's 8th avatar; Vasudev and Devaki's eighth son; Yashoda and Nand's foster son; Balram's brother; Kans' nephew, Radha's consort (2021–2022)
- Aditi Sajwan as Yashoda: Nand's wife; Krishna's foster mother. (2021–2022)
- Sumedh Mudgalkar as Lord Vishnu: Lakshmi's husband; Mahadev's devotee; Parvati's brother. (2021–2022)
- Mallika Singh as Devi Lakshmi: Lord Vishnu's wife. (2021–2022)
- Basant Bhatt as Sheshnag: Lord Vishnu's devotee; the serpent king. (2021–2022)
- Kevin Charadva as Balram: Sheshnaag's avataar; Vasudev and Devaki's seventh son; Rohini's foster son; Krishna's brother; Kans' nephew. (2021–2022)
- Kiara Singh as Radha: Vrishban and Kritida's daughter Goddess Lakshmi's avatar, Krishna's Eternal consort (2021–2022)
- Falaq Naaz as Devaki: Kans' sister; Vasudev's second wife; Balram and Krishna's mother. (2021–2022)
- Arpit Ranka as Kans: A demon king; Devaki's brother; Balram and Krishna's maternal uncle. (2021–2022)

=== Recurring ===
- Gavie Chahal as Nand: Gokul's head; Yashoda's husband; Krishna's foster father; Vasudev and Vrishbhan's friend. (2021–2022)
- ActorsFirdaush as senapati of kans (2022)
- Chetna Kaintura as Rohini: Vasudev's first wife; Balram's surrogate and foster mother. (2021–2022)
- Naveen Jinger as Vasudev: Rohini and Devaki's husband; Nand's friend; Balram and Krishna's father. (2021–2022)
- Tarun Khanna in dual role as
  - Lord Mahadev: Parvati's husband; Vishnu's devotee.(2021–2022)
  - Hanuman: Mahadev's incarnation (2021)
- Piyali Munshi in dual role as
  - Devi Parvati: Mahadev's wife; Vishnu's sister. (2021–2022)
  - Yogmaya: Parvati's incarnation (2021)
- Shalini Vishnudev as Devi Saraswati: Brahma's wife; Brahma's daughter. (2021–2022)
- Manish Bishla as Indra: The rain god and King of heaven. (2021–2022)
- Kumar Hegde as Narada: Brahma's son; Vishnu's devotee. (2021–2022)
- Sonia Singh as Putana: Kans' demoness slayed by Krishna. (2021)
- Deepak Jethi as Jarasandha: King of Magadha; Asti's father; Kans's father-in-law (2021)
- Chandralekha Mukherjee as Asti: Kans's wife; Jarasandh's daughter. (2021–2022)
- Gagan Yaduvanshi as Villager
- Rakesh Kukreti as Vrishbhan: Radha's father; Kirtida's husband and chief of Barsana. (2022-2022)
- Akanksha Rawat as Kirtida: Radha's mother; Vrishbhan's wife (2022-2022)
- Avit Shetty as Ashvasena (2022)
