= Sumedh Mudgalkar =

Indian actor and dancer (born 1996)

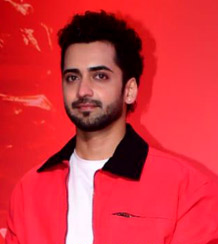
- Mudgalkar in 2024
- Born: 2 November 1996 (age 30)
- Occupations: Actor; dancer
- Years active: 2013–present
- Notable work: Chakravartin Ashoka Samrat; RadhaKrishn; Escaype Live

Sumedh Vasudev Mudgalkar (born 2 November 1996) is an Indian film and television actor, as well as a dancer. He is best known for his work as Shushim in Chakravartin Ashoka Samrat, as Krishna in RadhaKrishn and as Darkie in the Disney+ Hotstar series Escaype Live.

== Career ==
=== Dancing ===
He made his dance debut on a Marathi reality show, Dance Maharashtra Dance, in 2012 at the age of 15 and was one of the finalists. He appeared in Dance India Dance (Season 4) in 2013, where he reached the finals, finishing as 3rd runner-up.

=== Acting ===
Mudgalkar made his acting debut in Channel V’s Dil Dosti Dance, a dance-based youth show where he portrayed the role of Raghavendra "Raghav" Pratap Singh. Then he became known for portraying the main antagonist Yuvraj Sushim in the Indian historical drama Chakravartin Ashoka Samrat.

Sumedh next moved to the Marathi film industry with a cameo in the 2016 film Ventilator as Karan. He then appeared in Manjha, which was his first film as a main antagonist as well as lead actor, in which he portrayed the role of a psychopath named Vicky. In 2018, he played the role of Salil in Bucket List. Recently, he has also been shooting for the Marathi film Mann Yedyagat Zaala. In 2018, he featured in a music video for a Marathi song Bekhabar Kashi Tu.

From October 2018 to January 2023, he played the role of Krishna, Vishnu and Rama in Swastik Productions' television series RadhaKrishn on Star Bharat opposite Mallika Singh. In 2021, he reprised his role of Vishnu along with Mallika Singh and Basant Bhatt in RadhaKrishn's prequel series Jai Kanhaiya Lal Ki which also aired on Star Bharat and ended in July 2022.

In 2022 he featured as Darkie in Disney+ Hotstar's web series Escaype Live produced and directed by Siddharth Kumar Tewary under Swastik Productions.

From May to June 2023, he portrayed the role of Hatim al-Tai opposite Srishti Jain in Sony SAB's Ali Baba. Since then he was shooting for a web series and Marathi movie.

In May 2025, he featured as Sebi (Subhash Mhatre) in JioHotstar's web series Hai Junoon! Dream. Dare. Dominate. produced and directed by Abhishek Sharma under jio creatives lab productions.

=== Singing ===
Sumedh made his singing debut in a single, "Mere Paas Tum Raho", in March 2023. The music video featured Sumedh alongside Ambika Devi.

== Filmography ==
=== Films ===
Year	Title	Role	Language	Notes
2016	Ventilator	Karan	Marathi	Guest appearance
2017	Manjha	Vicky	Marathi	
2018	Bucket List	Salil	Marathi	
2024	Man Yedyagat Zala	Yash	Marathi	
TBA	Vicky - Full of Love		Marathi	

=== Television ===
Year	Title	Role	Notes
2013–2014	Dance India Dance (Season 4)	Contestant	3rd runner-up
2014	Dil Dosti Dance	Raghavendra "Raghav" Pratap Singh	
2015–2016	Chakravartin Ashoka Samrat	Young Sushim	
2017	Jhalak Dikhla Jaa (Season 9)	Himself	Episode 24
2018–2023	RadhaKrishn	Krishna/Vishnu/Rama/Srinivasa/Parashurama	
2019	Jag Janani Maa Vaishno Devi	Narrator	
2020	Jai Deva Shree Ganesha	Krishna	
2021–2022	Jai Kanhaiya Lal Ki	Vishnu	
2022	Swayamvar – Mika Di Vohti	Himself	Episode 27
2023	Bigg Boss OTT 2	Himself	Episode 30
2023	Ali Baba: Ek Andaaz Andekha	Hatim	

=== Web series ===
Year	Title	Role	Notes	Ref.
2022	Escaype Live	Darkie		
2025	Hai Junoon! Dream. Dare. Dominate.	Sebi (Subhash Mhatre)		
TBH	Anarth			

=== Music videos ===
Year	Title	Singer(s)	Language	Ref.
2018	Bekhabar Kashi Tu	Rohit Raut	Marathi	
2020	Meri Hai Maa	Tarsh	Hindi	
2022	Tu Hi Toh Hai	Abhi Dutt, Shambhavi Thakur	Hindi	
2023	Sazishen	Inam Ul Haq	Hindi	
2023	Ramti Aave	Abhinav Shekhar, Priyanka Kher	Hindi	

=== Discography ===
Year	Title	Co-singer	Composer	Language	Ref.
2023	Mere Paas Tum Raho	Prateeksha	Mohit Lalwani	Hindi	

== Awards and nominations ==
Year	Awards	Category	Work	Result	Ref.
2018	Filmfare Awards Marathi	Best Actor	Manjha	Nominated	
2019	Indian Telly Awards	Best Onscreen Couple (Jury) (with Mallika Singh)	RadhaKrishn	Won	
2019	Gold Awards	Best Debut Actor (Male)	RadhaKrishn	Won	
2021	20th Indian Television Academy Awards	Best Actor Popular	RadhaKrishn	Nominated	
2022	21st Indian Television Academy Awards	Best Actor Popular	RadhaKrishn	Nominated	
2022	22nd Indian Television Academy Awards	Popular Actor - Drama	RadhaKrishn	Nominated	
2022	22nd Indian Television Academy Awards	Popular Actor - Drama	Jai Kanhaiya Lal Ki	Nominated	
2022	22nd Indian Television Academy Awards	Popular Actor - OTT	Escaype Live	Nominated	
2022	Filmfare OTT Awards	Best Supporting Actor in a Series (Male): Drama	Escaype Live	Nominated	
2023	Indian Telly Awards	Fan Favorite Actor/ Actress - Mytho/ Super Natural	RadhaKrishn	Won	
2023	23rd Indian Television Academy Awards	Best Actor Popular	RadhaKrishn	Nominated	

== Media image ==
He was ranked in The Times of India's "Most Desirable Men of Maharashtra" at No. 17 in 2018, at No.15 in 2019, and at No. 6 in 2020.
