= Nyaay: The Justice =

2021 Indian Hindi-language biographical drama film by Dilip Gulati

Nyay: The Justice
- Directed by: Dilip Gulati
- Written by: Adesh K Arjun
- Produced by: Sarla A. Saraogi; Rahul Sharma
- Starring: Zuber K. Khan; Shreya Shukla; Aman Verma; Asrani; Shakti Kapoor; Sudha Chandran; Arun Bakshi; Kiran Kumar; Milind Gunaji; Anwar Fatehan; Anant Jog; Somi Khan; Roshan Kumar
- Production company: Vikas Productions
- Distributed by: Lapalap Originals
- Release date: 11 June 2021
- Country: India
- Language: Hindi

Nyaay: The Justice is a 2021 Indian Hindi-language biographical drama film. The film is directed by Dilip Gulati and produced by Saraogi and Rahul Sharma under the banner of Vikas Productions. The film features Zuber Khan and Shreya Shukla in the lead roles.

== Cast ==
- Zuber K. Khan as Mahendra Singh (based on Sushant Singh Rajput)
- Shreya Shukla as Urvashi, Mahendra's girlfriend (based on Rhea Chakraborty)
- Aman Verma as ED Chief
- Asrani as K. K. Singh, Mahendra's father (based on Krishna Kumar Singh Rajput)
- Shakti Kapoor as NCB Chief
- Sudha Chandran as CBI Chief
- Arun Bakshi
- Kiran Kumar as Mahinder's family lawyer
- Milind Gunaji as female Lead's lawyer
- Anwar Fatehan as Commissioner of Bihar Police
- Anant Jog as Commissioner of Mumbai Police
- Roshan Kumar as sub inspector of Mumbai police.

== Plot ==
The film follows Mahendra Singh, a man, from a small town who arrives in the film industry with big dreams and fresh energy. Through his work, talent and acting skills Mahendra Singh wins the hearts of both critics and audiences. Mahendra Singhs smart choices and bold decisions help him challenge people in the film industry.

The film follows his story in the film industry.

== Production ==
Nyaay: The Justice, which is inspired by the life of late actor Sushant Singh Rajput, wrapped up its final schedule in October 2020. It was released on 11 June 2021, after initially being projected to release in April 2021.
