= Jai Shri Krishna (TV series) =

2008 Indian drama TV series

- Starring: Meghan Jadhav; Kritika Sharma
- Opening theme: Jai Shri Krishna, jai shri.....
- Country of origin: India
- Original language: Hindi
- No. of seasons: 1
- No. of episodes: 285

Production
- Running time: 20 minutes
- Production companies: Sagar Pictures; Colosceum Media Pvt Ltd

Original release
- Network: Colors TV
- Release: 21 July 2008 – 15 September 2009

Related
- Shri Krishna (1993 TV series)

Jai Shri Krishna (transl. Hail Lord Krishna) is an Indian drama television series produced by Sagar Pictures, which aired on Colors TV from 21 July 2008 to 15 September 2009. It is the remake of Ramanand Sagar's successful show Sri Krishna and was handled by his son Moti Sagar of Sagar Pictures. It is based on Mahabharata, Harivamsa, Bhagavata Purana, and the Vishnu Purana.

== Plot ==
Jai Shri Krishna tells the story of the Bhagavan Vishnu's avatar, Shree Krishna. The story takes place in India, covering cities like Gokhul, Mathura, Hastinapur, and Dawaraka. It shows the different leelas, or stories, of Shree Krishna from his birth, childhood, teenage years, and time as prince of Mathura and prince of Dwarka.

The program touched on many different aspects of his life, through the retelling of the leelas, it is told that he was known as Makhan Chor (butter thief) and of his eternal friendship with Sudama as a good example of true friendship. Other aspects include some of his adventures, such as when he killed the demon queen Putana and tamed the venomous serpent Kaliya. Yet another amazing story was how as a little boy he showed the entire universe in his open mouth to his foster Mother, Yashoda.

As a teenager he shared a divine relationship with Radha who was considered a form of goddess lakshmi. His dance with the Gopis (milkmaids) of Vrindavana became known as the Rasa lila. Later, when he became a fully grown man, the series tells about how he slayed his evil uncle, Kans (although, in the actual tales, Krishna was much younger when he slayed his uncle – he may have been as young as 12 years old).

After becoming a prince, Krishna married Rukmini, believed to be forms of the goddess Lakshmi, who is the consort of Vishnu.

The series portrays Lord Shree Krishna as the perfect son, husband, brother, friend, king and lover of many. The show followed every aspect of Lord Krishna's life up until Lord Krishna's teenage years.

== Cast ==
Actor/Actress	Role
Meghan Jadhav	Krishna, Paundraka Vasudeva
Kritika Sharma	Radha Rani
Dhriti Bhatia	Krishna (Child)
Pinky Rajput	Krishna (Child)
Virti Vaghani	Radha (Child)
Kunal Gaud	Krishna (Young)
Aditi Sajwan	Yashoda
Zeb Khan	Nand / Nandrai / Nandraiji
Ashhcharrya Shetty	Rohini
Saurabh Raj Jain	Lord Vishnu, Vishvarupa
Tarun Khanna	Hanuman ji
Payel de	Maa Lalitha Tripura Sundari, Mahakali
Arpit Ranka	Kamadeva, Pradyumna, Bhandasur
Rudrajit Mukhrajee	Lord Shiva, Kameshvar
Yogesh Mahajan Marathi	Vasudeva ji
Priyanka Tiwari	Devki
Nitin Prabhat	Balram
Raj Premi	Kans
Prachee Pathak	Keshni
Ram Awana	Chanur
Shahab Khan	Acharya Garg Rishi

== Broadcast ==
A shortened version for kids also aired on Nickelodeon India in 2009. A new character of "Grandmother" was added to narrate the series.
