= Mallika Singh =

Indian television actress (born 2000)

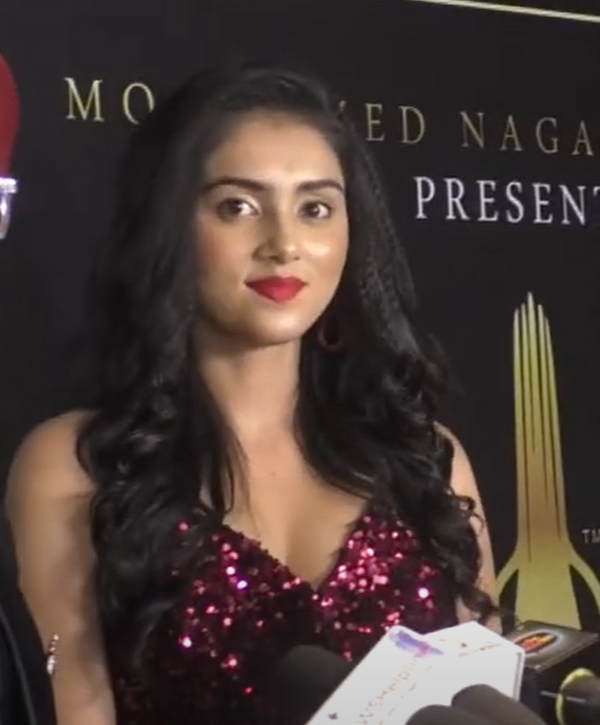
- Mallika Singh 2021
- Born: 15 September 2000 (age 25); Jammu, Jammu and Kashmir, India
- Citizenship: Indian
- Occupation: Actress
- Years active: 2015–present
- Known for: RadhaKrishn; Jai Kanhaiya Lal Ki; Pracchand Ashok

Mallika Singh (born 15 September 2000) is an Indian television actress. She is known for portraying Radha in RadhaKrishn, Lakshmi in Jai Kanhaiya Lal Ki, and Karuvaki in Pracchand Ashok.

== Career ==
In 2016, Singh appeared in Zee TV's Janbaaz Sindbad, where she played the role of Aameen.

From October 2018 to January 2023, she appeared in Star Bharat's RadhaKrishn, where she played the lead role of Radha opposite Sumedh Mudgalkar. She also played several recurring characters including Sita, Lakshmi, Bhudevi, Ashtalakshmi, Shitala, Alakshmi, Vallabha, Vrindavaneshwari, Madhavi, Bhargavi, Ambabai, and Kishori.

From October 2021 to July 2022, she reprised her role as Devi Lakshmi in RadhaKrishn's prequel series Jai Kanhaiya Lal Ki on Star Bharat.

In May 2022, she appeared as Srini in Disney+ Hotstar's Escaype Live.

In 2024, she featured in Simple Suni's romantic comedy film Ondu Sarala Prema Kathe opposite Vinay Rajkumar. From February 2024 to March 2024, Singh portrayed Karuvaki opposite Adnan Khan in Ekta Kapoor's historical drama series Pracchand Ashok on Colors TV.

== Filmography ==
=== Films ===
Year	Title	Role	Language	Ref.
2024	Ondu Sarala Prema Kathe	Madhura	Kannada	

=== Television ===
Year	Title	Role	Notes	Ref.
2015–2016	Janbaaz Sindbad	Aameen		
2018–2023	RadhaKrishn	Radha / Lakshmi / Sita / Bhargavi		
2021–2022	Jai Kanhaiya Lal Ki	Lakshmi		
2022	Swayamvar – Mika Di Vohti	Herself	Episode 27	
2024	Pracchand Ashok	Karuvaki		

=== Web series ===
Year	Title	Role	Ref.
2022	Escaype Live	Shrini Rangaswamy	

=== Music videos ===
Year	Title	Singer(s)	Ref.
2023	Tere Ishq Ne	Saaj Bhatt	

== Awards and nominations ==
Year	Award	Category	Work	Result	Ref.
2019	Indian Telly Awards	Best Onscreen Couple (Jury) (with Sumedh Mudgalkar)	RadhaKrishn	Won	
2022	21st Indian Television Academy Awards	Best Actress Popular	RadhaKrishn	Nominated	
2022	22nd Indian Television Academy Awards	Best Actress Popular	RadhaKrishn	Nominated	
2022	22nd Indian Television Academy Awards	Best Actress Popular	Jai Kanhaiya Lal Ki	Nominated	
