= Anju Jadhav =

Indian television and film actress

- Born: 3 July 1993 (age 33); Indore, Madhya Pradesh
- Occupations: Actress, Model

Anju Jadhav is an Indian actress. She is best known for her roles in television shows including Sankat Mochan Mahabali Hanumaan, Kuch Rang Pyar Ke Aise Bhi, Kasautii Zindagii Kay and Wagle Ki Duniya – Nayi Peedhi Naye Kissey. In 2019, she made her Bollywood debut with Dosti Ke Side Effects.

== Career ==
Jadhav played the role of Sukhanda in Mahabharat and the role of Saraswati in Sankat Mochan Mahabali Hanumaan. She played the role of Tina in Kuch Rang Pyar Ke Aise Bhi in 2016. She also acted in Dil Deke Dekho, where she portrayed Preet Shastri. In 2018, she played Anjali in the series Kasautii Zindagii Kay.

Jadhav made her 2019 debut in Bollywood with Dosti Ke Side Effects. She played Swara Rane in Tujhse Hai Raabta from 2019 to 2020.

== Filmography ==
=== Television ===
Year	Show	Role	Notes
2013	Mahabharat	Sukhada	
2015	Savdhaan India	Nisha	episode: "When Perversion Lead To Crime"
2015–2017	Sankat Mochan Mahabali Hanumaan	Saraswati	
2016	Kuch Rang Pyar Ke Aise Bhi	Tina	
2016–2017	Dil Deke Dekho	Preet Shastri	
2016	CID		
2018	Kasautii Zindagii Kay	Anjali	
2019–2020	Tujhse Hai Raabta	Swara Rane	
2021–2025	Wagle Ki Duniya – Nayi Peedhi Naye Kissey	Kiara Tejwani	
2025–2026	Yeh Rishta Kya Kehlata Hai	Meher Mittal	

=== Film ===
Year	Film	Role	Notes
2019	Dosti Ke Side Effects	Avani	Debut film
