= Gavie Chahal =

Indian actor

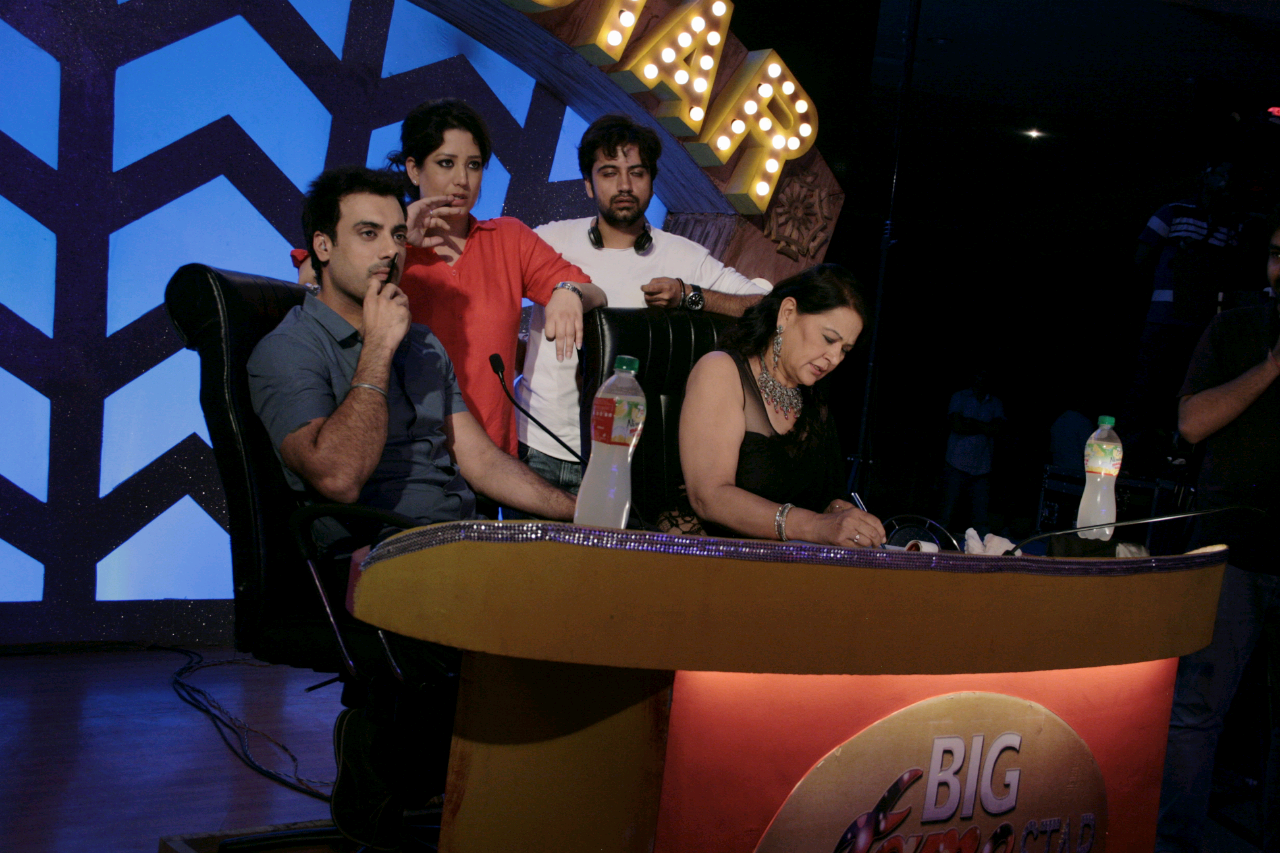
- Born: Navdeepak Singh Chahal
- Occupation: Actor
- Years active: 2000–present

Navdeepak Singh Chahal better known by his stage name Gavie Chahal, is an Indian actor who primarily works in Hindi and Punjabi cinema.

== Career ==
Chahal won the title of Mr. Punjab in 2000. His first music video, "Jattan de putt saadh ho gaye" was a success, after which he appeared in many music videos. In 2005, he shifted to Mumbai where he grabbed a role in the successful daily soap Kyunki Saas Bhi Kabhi Bahu Thi, produced by Balaji Telefilms, but later, he left the show to act in the Punjabi film Yaaran Naal Baharan. In 2011, Chahal signed for playing Shivendu Kaushik in Mrs. Kaushik Ki Paanch Bahuein, Broadcast on Zee TV, but later he left the show in March 2012 as he had to shoot for the Bollywood film Ek Tha Tiger. He also participated in the AXN's adventure show Fear Factor, in which he won the championship. He is known for his Hindi film debut in Yash Raj's 2012 film Ek Tha Tiger.

== Filmography ==
=== Films ===
- Yaaran Naal Baharan (2005)
- Mehndi Wale Hath (2006)
- Majajan (2008)
- Tere ishq Nachaya (2010)
- Pinky Moge Wali (2012)
- Ek Tha Tiger (2012) as Captain Abrar Sheikh
- Saada Jawai NRI (2013)
- Saako 363 (2014)
- iPhone Mann (2014)
- Yaarana (2015)
- Hum Sab Ullu Hain (2015)
- Pinda Vicho Pinda Sunida (2016)
- Yeh Hai India (2019)
- Chicken Biryani (2017)
- Tiger Zinda Hai as Captain Abrar Sheikh (2017)
- Haunted Hills (2020)
- Tiger 3 (2023) as Major Abrar Sheikh
- Bombay (2025)

=== Television ===
| Year | Title | Role |
|---|---|---|
| 2005 | Kyunki Saas Bhi Kabhi Bahu Thi | |
| 2008 | Mohe Rang De | Raajveer |
| 2009 | Koi Aane Ko Hai | Animesh |
| 2010 | Maharaja Ranjit Singh | Maha Singh |
| 2011 | Adaalat | Sunil Kamat |
| 2011 | Mrs. Kaushik Ki Paanch Bahuein | Shivendu Kaushik |
| 2018–2020 | RadhaKrishn | Nanda |
| 2021 | Kuch Rang Pyar Ke Aise Bhi: Nayi Kahaani | Rohit Verma |
| 2021–2022 | Jai Kanhaiya Lal Ki | Nanda |

=== Music videos ===
- Jattan De Putt Sadh Ho Gaye
