= Haunted Hills =

Indian horror film

- Directed by: Sanjeev Kumar Rajput
- Written by: Sanjeev Kumar Rajput
- Produced by: Ravi Kant Dixit; Shashi Kant Dixit; Banwari Lal Dixit; Shailendra Dixit
- Starring: Zuber K. Khan; Diana Khan; Gavie Chahal; Surendra Pal Singh
- Cinematography: Santosh Pal
- Edited by: Azeem Pasha
- Music by: Gaurav Sandeep
- Release date: 28 February 2020
- Running time: 102 minutes
- Country: India
- Language: English

Haunted Hills (transl. हॉन्टेड हिल्स) is an Indian Hindi-language horror romantic film, written and directed by Sanjeev Kumar Rajput. The films stars Zuber K. Khan and Diana Khan in the lead roles.

== Cast ==
- Zuber K. Khan as Rohit
- Gavie Chahal
- Diana Khan
- Krishna Chaturvedi
- Mansi Gupta
- Surendra Pal Singh
- Adarsh Kumar
- Nitin Dixit
- Omkar Sharma

== Plot ==
Haunted Hills revolves around a honeymooning couple. The wife dies accidentally, and her soul remains in a painting that she leaves incomplete.

== Production ==
This film was shot in Nainital and Mussoorie in Uttarakhand (India).

== Soundtrack ==
Haunted Hills

Soundtrack album by Gaurav Sandeep
- Released: 14 February 2020
- Recorded: 2019–2020
- Genre: Feature film soundtrack
- Length: 3:43
- Language: Hindi
- Label: Red Ribbon Musik
External audio
- Video on YouTube

The music of the film is composed by Asif Chandwani and sung by singers including Palak Muchhal, Mohammed Irfan and Dev Negi.

No.	Title	Lyrics	Music	Singer(s)	Length
1.	"Iss Dil Ko Thoda" (Hindi)	Sandeep Jaiswal; Vipin Sharma; Rahul Mehar	Gaurav Sandeep	Mohammed Irfan	03:43
2.	"Har Raahaton" (Hindi)	Sandeep Jaiswal	Gaurav Sandeep	Palak Muchhal	-
Total length:					3:43

== Release ==
The film was released in India on 28 February 2020.

The film was premiered on Zee Cinema on 15 November 2020.

== See also ==
- List of Bollywood horror films
