= Nidhi Yasha =

Indian costume designer (born 1983)

- Born: 26 April 1983 (age 43); Patna, Bihar
- Occupation: Costume designer
- Years active: 2010-present
- Website: https://nidhiyasha.com/

Nidhi Yasha (born 26 April 1983) is an Indian costume designer. She designs costumes for Zee TV's Buddha and Star Plus TV series Mahabharat (2013 TV series)(2013) with Bhanu Athaiya as her consulting faculty for the show. Yasha said they studied over 450 books related to period textiles, costume and jewellery to arrive at the look for the show.

== Career ==
Nidhi created the costumes and styled the look for shows like Ramleela – Ajay Devgn Ke Saath, Devon Ka Dev Mahadev, Chandragupta Maurya, Shobha Somnath Ki, Navya, Anhoniyon Ka Andhera, Durga, Buddha, Savitri, Jodha-Akbar, Mahabharat and films like Haunted, Jal, 1920 Evil Returns, Dangerous Ishhq, Maximum and Zilla Ghaziabad, and Policegiri.

== Recognition ==
She won an Indian Television Academy Award and Indian Telly award for her work in Shobha Somnath Ki, on Zee TV.

Nidhi had worked as a costume designer for Swastik Pictures from 2009 to 2011.
