= Aakhri Sauda: The Last Deal =

2016 film directed by Sandeep Kumar

- Directed by: Sandeep Kumar
- Written by: Sandeep Kumar
- Screenplay by: Sandeep Kumar
- Produced by: Mukesh Malhotra; Padmakar Athawale
- Starring: Zuber K. Khan; Tanvi Arora; Aaryan Chopra; Sonia Bajwa; Soni Jha; Mushtaq Khan; Ehsaan Khan; Prithvi Zutshi; Dev Malhotra; Anil Nagrath; Kailash Kaushik; Pentali Sen
- Cinematography: Rajendra Sharma
- Edited by: Krishna
- Music by: Raja Ali
- Production company: Silver 9 Movies
- Distributed by: Silver 9 Movies
- Release date: 22 April 2016
- Country: India
- Language: Hindi

Aakhri Sauda: The Last Deal is an Indian 2016 Bollywood thriller film, directed by Sandeep Kumar and produced by Mukesh Malhotra and Padmakar Athawale under the banner of Silver 9 Movies.

Zuber K. Khan and Tanvi Arora play the male and female lead roles respectively.

== Cast ==
- Zuber K. Khan
- Tanvi Arora
- Aaryan Chopra
- Sonia Bajwa
- Soni Jha
- Mushtaq Khan
- Ehsaan Khan
- Prithvi Zutshi
- Dev Malhotra
- Anil Nagrath
- Kailash Kaushik
- Pentali Sen

== Production ==
=== Filming ===
The principal photography of the film commenced sometime in 2015. The film was entirely shot in Mumbai.
