= Escaype Live =

2022 Indian thriller web series

- Genre: Thriller
- Created by: Siddharth Kumar Tewary
- Written by: Jaya Misra; Siddharth Kumar Tewary
- Directed by: Siddharth Kumar Tewary
- Starring: Siddharth; Jaaved Jaaferi; Shweta Tripathi; Sumedh Mudgalkar; Waluscha De Sousa; Plabita Borthakur; Ritvik Sahore
- Country of origin: India
- Original language: Hindi
- No. of seasons: 1
- No. of episodes: 9

Production
- Executive producer: Sakett Saawhney
- Producers: Siddharth Kumar Tewary; Gayatri Gill Tewary; Rahul Kumar Tewary
- Production locations: Mumbai, India
- Cinematography: Aseem Mishra
- Editor: Chandan Arora
- Camera setup: Multi-camera
- Running time: 35-40 mins approx
- Production company: One Life Studios

Original release
- Network: Disney+ Hotstar
- Release: 20 May 2022

Escaype Live is a 2022 Indian Hindi-language television series created and directed by Siddharth Kumar Tewary. It is written by Jaya Misra and Siddharth Kumar Tewary, with dialogues by Vinod Sharma, Amol Surve and Ranveer Pratap Singh. Produced by Siddharth Kumar Tewary under the banner of One Life Studios, the series stars Siddharth, Jaaved Jaaferi, Shweta Tripathi, Sumedh Mudgalkar, Waluscha De Sousa, Plabita Borthakur and Ritvik Sahore. Escaype Live 9 episodes were launched on Disney+Hotstar in two instalments within a week of each other. Episode 1- 7 were dropped on 20 May 2022 and the two - part finale a week later, thereby successfully engaging their viewers and building curiosity over its content within the week.

== Plot ==
A live streaming app has announced a contest promising instant fame and fortune to its most popular participant which turns the mundane lives of six regular Indians upside down as their reality begins to change form.

== Cast ==
- Siddharth as Krishna Rangaswamy
- Jaaved Jaaferi as Ravi Gupta
- Shweta Tripathi as Sunaina
- Waluscha De Sousa as Gia Bose
- Sumedh Mudgalkar as Dark Angel a.k.a. Darkie, Bablu in flash back
- Plabita Borthakur as Hina a.k.a. Fetish Girl
- Ritvik Sahore as Nilesh Sonawane a.k.a. Aamcha Spider
- Aadya Sharma as Rani Singh a.k.a. Dance Rani
- Rohit Chandel as Rajkumar a.k.a. Meena
- Swastika Mukherjee as Mala
- Alekh Sangal as Baldev
- Geetika Vidya Ohlyan as Sita
- Jagjeet Sandhu as Nandu
- Mallika Singh as Shrini Rangaswamy
- Aakanksha Singh as Devna
- Sharat Saxena as Rajkumar's Father
- Sanjay Narvekar as Aamcha's Father
- Smita Tambe as Aamcha's Mother
- Rajveer Singh Rajput as Contractor
- Arundhati Nag as Laxmi Amma
- Anagh Jain as Dhruv Bhalla
- Ashwin Mushran as Jogi Balla / Dhruv's Father
- Aditi Govitrikar as Meenal Bhalla / Dhruv's Mother
- Kunal Thakkar as Kunal (CTO)
- Khuman as Tashi

== Series overview ==
Series	Episodes	Originally released
1	9	20 May 2022

=== Episodes ===
No.	Title	Directed by	Original release date
1	"The Game Begins"	Siddharth Kumar Tewary	20 May 2022
Krishna Rangaswamy a man high on moral ethics and values joins a live streaming social networking app "Escaype Live" as a moderator. Soon after, a grand competition promising a prize of 3 crores to its popular contestants is announced where neither him, nor the contestants know how the contest will throw all their lives in a tizzy.
2	"Follow/Like/Love"	Siddharth Kumar Tewary	20 May 2022
As the games begins, the most popular contestant Darkie finds himself in a face off with Aamcha Spyder. The Face Offs heat up as Fetish Girl steams up the game with her acts while Nandu, Rani's uncle stumbles upon a dreadful idea for his niece's win. Krishna meanwhile resigns after realising that the only rule of this game is that 'There are NO RULES'. As the stakes rise, no one knows what's in store ahead.
3	"#Nofilter"	Siddharth Kumar Tewary	20 May 2022
Rajkumar, a bank employee hailing from Varanasi reluctantly meets a prospective bride under family pressure just as Amcha spyder realises he needs to completely transform himself to stand a chance in the game. Sudden erratic changes show up in Rani's behaviour as the pressure mounts while Fetish's real identity is on the verge of being revealed to her boss. With the unprecedented revelation of a new player, Krishna too stumbles upon damaging information about the contest, casting a doubt on its own existence.
4	"Cheat Code"	Siddharth Kumar Tewary	20 May 2022
Darkie with his knack for sensationalism makes the ratings of the show soar as he enthusiastically plans the deadliest party ever. Mala's obsession with Fetish starts getting more and more vicious while Amcha's next move turns into a big fatal mistake. Meanwhile Krishna's conscience makes him feel compelled to expose the secret.
5	"Bhram"	Siddharth Kumar Tewary	20 May 2022
With the increasing pressure of the competition, all facades start crumbling. As Rajkumar's illusion breaks, the true faces of all contestants starts to show up. The authorities contemplate to crack down on the contest when a fatal accident is telecast live on the app leaving all viewers stunned. Dance Rani's father is alarmed and orders her not to use the app anymore Krishna, guilty of facilitating the wrong tries to make it right to fetish, but ends up unravelling his own spotted.
6	"Search for the Truth"	Siddharth Kumar Tewary	20 May 2022
As the contest now rolls like a juggernaut towards an explosive finale, Amcha struggles with a broken spirit due to his last action and fetish girl makes one more brave attempt to get rid of her issues. Rani despite her personal sufferings, gets ahead by the day not knowing that someone with a dark past is plotting to make sure she loses.
7	"Nautanki"	Siddharth Kumar Tewary	20 May 2022
As the personal lives of contestants get into a tailspin, Meena and her father have a fallout which breaks her heart. Krishna gets a request from fetish girl to help her win the contest. Rani gets enticed by a secret admirer and runs away to meet him creating a pandemonium. Troubles mount for Darkie as the Delhi police close in on him.
8	"#EndGame"	Siddharth Kumar Tewary	27 May 2022
Meena feels that her life is at its worst, even as her popularity soars and she reaches the top of the competition chart. Rani is shocked when she gets to know the real identity of Mr Lova Lova and feels trapped with no way to escape. All contestants go all out to win the contest as the finale gets closer. Krishna gets help from unexpected quarters as he attempts to do the right thing as per his moral values.
9	"The Ouroborus : Every End holds a New Beginning"	Siddharth Kumar Tewary	27 May 2022
It's finale time but with a cruel twist in it. The brains behind Escaype live blur the lines between morality and business as they are stunned by emergence of an unlikely winner. As the competition ends, life seems to be curling back to normal, unknown to an even deadlier game that has already begun.

== Release ==
The trailer of the series was released on 26 April 2022 consisting of seven episodes premiered on Disney+ Hotstar on 20 May 2022 and remaining two episodes were released on 27 May 2022.

== Critical reception ==
The series received high praise for its edgy ideas and concept but critique for its directorial choices. Manik Sharma for Firstpost wrote that "Escaype Live is fascinating for the many ideas it confronts, from gender to identity, from class to the politics of internal borders. And foremost, as a fluid critique of the social media ecosystem that has spawned many fake lives, often at the cost of some original ones. The price paid in the creation of these lives is what Live wants to construct and explore. And for that, it can have all my money." The Binged review for the series states that "Escaype Live has an interesting, relevant-to-the-times premise". Farhad Dalal for popcornreviewss.com wrote that "Escaype Live is a deliciously dark show which exposes the underbelly of social media". Contrastly, Rohan Naahar for The Indian Express opined that "Escaype Live is a monumentally irritating show that talks down to its audience with no regard for their time, money and patience".
