= Dosti Ke Side Effects =

- Official Movie Poster
- Directed by: Hadi Ali Abrar
- Written by: Reena Daniel
- Screenplay by: Pankaj Uniyal
- Produced by: Joyal Daniel
- Starring: Sapna Chowdhary; Vikrant Anand; Zuber K. Khan; Anju Jadhav; Neel Motwani; Sai Ballal; Vaishnavi Mahant kushi a.k.a."Rebecca"; Himmayat Ali
- Cinematography: Anil B. Akki
- Edited by: Ashish Gaikar
- Music by: Altaaf Sayeed; Manny Verma
- Production company: Share Happiness Films
- Release date: 8 February 2019
- Country: India
- Language: Hindi

Dosti Ke Side Effects (English: Side effects of friendship) is a 2019 Indian Hindi-language comedy-drama film directed by Hadi Ali Abrar and produced by Joyal Daniel. Set in North India and Delhi, the film features Sapna Choudhary with Vikrant Anand. This Film Also include an ensemble cast of Zuber K. Khan, Anju Jadhav and Neel Motwani in pivotal roles. The film was shot in various locations in Mumbai including Film City.

== Cast ==
- Sapna Chowdhary as Shristi
- Vikrant Anand as Ranveer
- Neel Motwani as Manveer
- Zuber K. Khan as Gaurav
- Anju Jadhav as Avni
- Rebecca Anand (Special Appearance)
- Sai Ballal as Dharamveer
- Vaishnavi Mahant as Shiristi's mother
- Himmayat Ali as local goon
- Shantanu Bhamare

== Marketing ==
The poster of the film was released on 30 October 2018 and the teaser was released on 4 December 2018 in the YouTube channel of Zee Music Company.

== Music ==
The film's soundtrack is composed by Altaaf Sayeed and Manny Verma. The music is reported to be released by Zee Music Company.

Dosti ke side effectss

Soundtrack album by Altaaf Sayeed and Manny Verma
- Released: 28 January 2019
- Recorded: 2018
- Genre: Feature Film Soundtrack
- Length: 18:15
- Language: Hindi
- Label: Zee Music Company
