= Arpit Ranka =

Indian model and actor

- Born: 30 June 1983 (age 43)
- Occupations: Actor; model
- Years active: 2008–present
- Known for: Duryodhana in Mahabharat; Kans in RadhaKrishn
- Spouse: Nidhi 'Abhi' Somani Ranka (m. 2012)
- Children: 2

Arpit Ranka (born 30 June 1983) is an Indian model and actor. He is best known for portraying Duryodhana in Mahabharat and Kans in RadhaKrishn.

== Filmography ==
=== Films ===
Year	Title	Role	Language	Notes
2010	Paiyaa	Baali's henchman	Tamil	
2010	Ayyanar	Ramani	Tamil	
2012	Jaaneman	Sridhar's henchman	Bengali	
2014	Ajith	Baali's henchman	Kannada	
2015	Rey	Dange	Telugu	
2015	MSG-2 The Messenger	Azgar	Hindi	
2015	Booloham	Destroyer Dayal	Tamil	
2015	Rudhramadevi	Varada Reddy	Telugu	
2023	Bholaa	Bhoora	Hindi	
2025	Kannappa	Kala Mukha	Telugu	
TBA	3 Monkeys		Hindi	

=== Television ===
Year	Title	Role	Notes
2008–2009	Jai Shri Krishna	Kamadeva	
2008–2009	Jai Shri Krishna	Pradyumna	
2008–2009	Jai Shri Krishna	Bhandasura	
2013–2014	Mahabharat	Duryodhana	Main Antagonist
2015	Nach Baliye 7	Contestant	10th place
2016–2017	Chandra Nandini	Emperor Mahapadma Nanda	
2017	Sankat Mochan Mahabali Hanuman	Shatanand Ravana	
2018	Kaun Hai?	Hiranyakashipu	Season 2
2018–2019	RadhaKrishn	Kans	
2020–2021	Brahmarakshas	Yug Suryavanshi	Season 2
2020–2021	Brahmarakshas	Brahmarakshas	Season 2
2020–2021	Devi Adi Parashakti	Maharaj Kaliyug	
2021–2022	Jai Kanhaiya Lal Ki	Kans	
2022	Swaraj: Bharat Ke Swatantrata Sangram ki Samagra Gatha	Shivappa Nayaka	
2024	Tavvai		

== Early & Personal Life ==
Ranka was born and brought up in Bhilwara, Rajasthan to Lakshilal Ranka and Chandra Ranka. He has an elder brother and a younger sister. Ranka married Nidhi Somani on 17 October 2012. The couple welcomed their first child, a son, on 27 September 2016. Their second child, a daughter was born on 7 October 2021.
