= Fatal: Chapter 1 =

Web series

- Genre: Drama; Murder Mystery; Mystery; Romance; Crime
- Screenplay by: Chinii Chetan
- Story by: Chinii Chetan
- Directed by: Chinni Chetan
- Starring: Zuber K. Khan; Suresh Vishwakarma; Sunil Mani; Manisha Tambade
- Music by: Rehan Khan; Shahid Mallya (playback singer)
- Country of origin: India
- Original language: Hindi
- No. of seasons: 1
- No. of episodes: 6

Production
- Producers: Keshar Singh Bhandari; Rishabh Chhabria; Dinesh Kumar R. Sharma
- Production location: India
- Cinematography: Ninad Tambe
- Editor: Arun D. Yadav
- Camera setup: Multi-camera
- Production companies: Likap Films; ZAAR Films

Original release
- Network: MX Player
- Release: 14 March – 14 March 2024

Fatal: Chapter 1 (Hindi: घातक: अध्याय 1) is an Indian, Hindi-Language Web Series directed by Chinii Chetan for MX Player. The series stars Zuber K. Khan, Suresh Vishwakarma and Sunil Mani in key roles alongside Manisha Tambade.

== Summary ==
When an unidentified fingerprint is discovered on a crime scene Insp. Kadam finds himself in a spiral of deceiving clues facing a powerful foe.

== Cast ==
- Zuber K. Khan as Maddy
- Suresh Vishwakarma as Inspector Kadam
- Sunil Mani as Ritesh
- Manisha Tambade as Kavya
- Soonia Prajapat as Nancy
- Shubham Pradeep Surve as Jolly

== Production ==
The web-series was mostly shot in Shirdi and Mumbai, Maharashtra, India.

== Overview ==
Series overview
Series	Episodes	Originally released	
Series	Episodes	First released	Last released
Chapter 1	6	14 March 2024	14 March 2024
