= Zuber K. Khan =

Indian actor

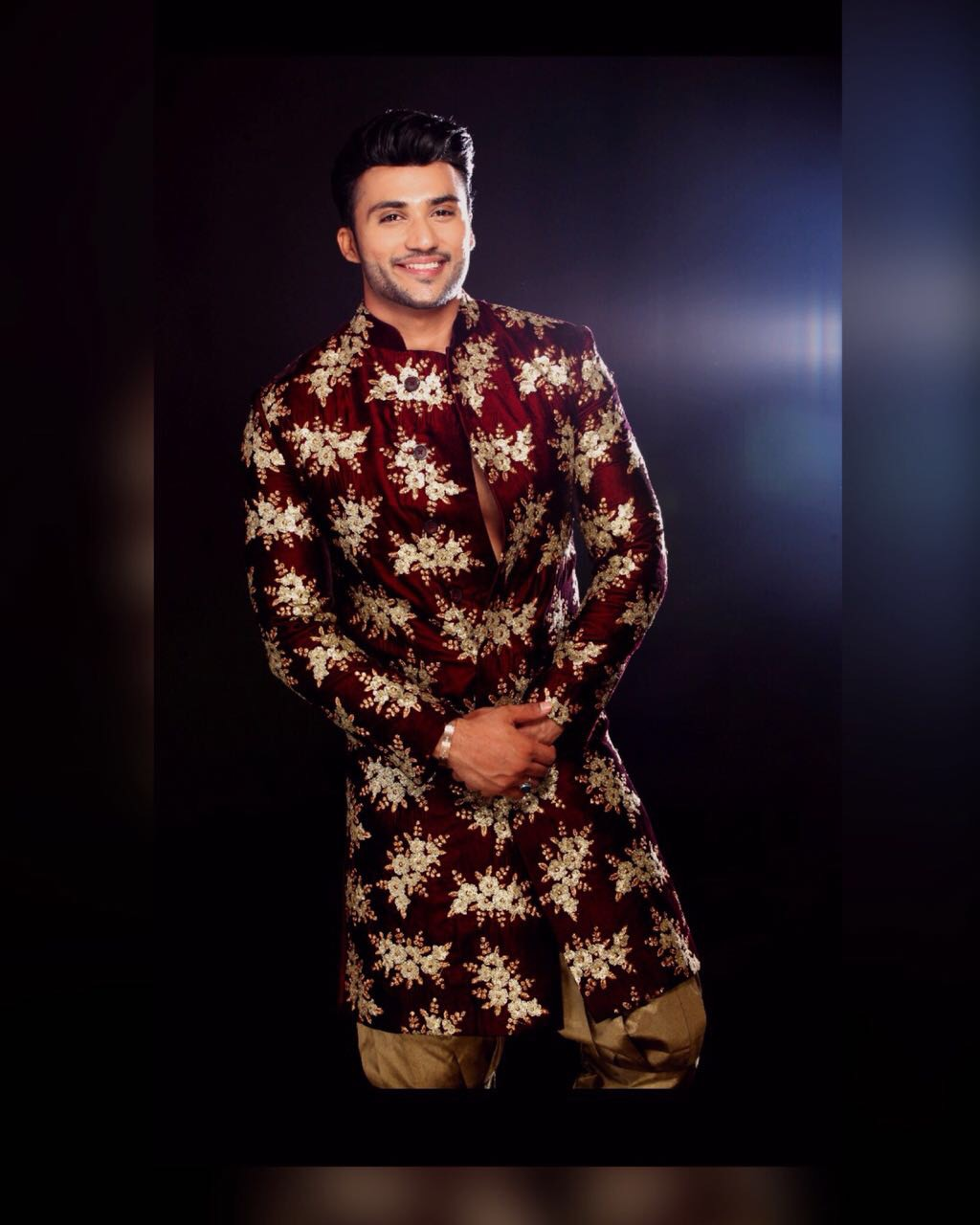
- Born: Bhopal, Madhya Pradesh, India
- Occupation: Actor
- Years active: 2011–present

Zuber Kamal Khan, professionally known as Zuber K. Khan, is an Indian model and actor who appears in Hindi films. He made his firm debut in 2014 in Lekar Hum Deewana Dil. He won Raymond model of the year. He followed that with Mr India Best Model Worldwide 2012. He stepped into acting after acting in theatre under Habib Tanvir.

== Career ==
In 2014, Khan appeared in Lekar Hum Deewana Dil. He served in the Indian Army. He then did commercials Panasonic, Tatamanza, Chocolate Room, Garnier, Telebrands, Aegon life insurance. His TV debut came on StarPlus in Iss Pyaar Ko Kya Naam Doon?. Zuber appeared on episodic shows on Sony, Zee TV StarPlus on shows such as Cid, Aahat, Fearfiles and Emotional Atyachar.

He played the main antagonist Muzzamik on Supercops vs Super Villains. Zuber debuted in daily soap opera with the Kasam Tere Pyaar Ki as Manpreet Singh Bedi.

Khan appeared on Naagin 3 as Ritivik, the paranormal activist.

Khan portrayed a psycho lover on Manmohini, which airs on Zee TV.

Mirror-The reflection of life directed by Naveen Batra will be Khan's debut on the digital platform.

His film, Nyaay: The Justice which is based on the life of Sushant Singh Rajput was released on 11 June 2021 on the OTT platform "Lapalap Originals". He played the character of Mahendra Singh (based on Rajput) and Shreya Shukla played the role of Urvashi (based on Rhea Chakraborty) in the film. The film was directed by Dilip Gulati & produced by Vikas Productions.

== Filmography ==
Year	Film	Role	Director	Producer	Language	Note	Ref
2014	Lekar Hum Deewana Dil	Sameer			Hindi	Supporting Actor	
2015	Soul	Raj			Hindi	Lead	
2016	Aakhri Sauda: The Last Deal	Dheeraj			Hindi	Lead	
2017	The Dream Job	Mukesh Mahajan			Hindi	Lead	
2019	Pagal Kar Diya Toone	Rohan			Hindi	Lead	
2019	Dosti Ke Side Effects	Gaurav Yadav			Hindi	Lead	
2020	Haunted Hills	Rohit			Hindi	Lead	
2021	Nyaay: The Justice	Mahendra Singh			Hindi	released on "Lapalap Originals" platform	
2022	Gotakhor	Kartik			Hindi	Prime video	
2024	Motel	Ehshan			Hindi	Upcoming	
2024	Damned graveyard	Shekhar			Hindi	Lead	
2024	Dhadke Dil Baar Baar	Priyank			Hindi	Negative Lead	
2024	Pyaar ke kabil	Vikram			Hindi	Upcoming	
2024	Pyar Mei Qurban †	Veer	Yes	Yes	Hindi		
2024	Vampire Saga †	Abhi	Yes	Yes	Hindi	Lead	

== Television ==
Year	Title	Role	Name
2012	Fear Files	Episodic Lead Actor	Jay Singh & Vishwa
2013–2015	SuperCops vs Supervillains	Supporting Actor	Waxman, lightman Muzammik & Electroman
2014	Kumkum Bhagya	Cameo	wedding planner
2014–2015	Savdhaan India	Episodic Lead Actor	
2016–2018	Kasam Tere Pyaar Ki	Supporting Actor	Manpreet Singh Raj Singh Bedi
	Sadda Haq	Supporting Actor	
2018	Vikram Betaal Ki Rahasya Gatha	Cameo	Raja Veer Badrth
2019	Naagin 3	Cameo	Ritvik, a paranormal investigator
2019	Manmohini	Parallel Lead Actor	Vanraj

== Music videos ==
Year	Song	Singer(s)	Notes
2021	Aag lagayegi	Ritik chouhan & Diya ghosh	Featuring; Pentali sen & Nafiz bawani
2022	Tere naal hai jeena	Sehzada yuvraj	Featuring; Tamkeen khan
2022	Goa vich nach le	Lalit agarwal, Shahid mallya & Pinky maidasani	Featuring; Lalit agarwal, Pooja puri & Pintali sen
2022	Tere wada	Imtiyaz bhat	Featuring; Soonia prajapat, Tamkeen khan & Imtiyaz bhat
2022	Ferrari	Tanya chandra	Featuring; Baldev das devraj
2023	Tasveer	Rashid hussain	Featuring; Priyanka KD
2023	Aa bhi jaa	Imtiyaz bhat	Featuring;Tamkeen khan
2023	Gunnah	Sehzada yuvraj	Featuring;Menakaa rai & Imran ali
2023	Oo watana ve	Prakash dey	Written & Directed by; Zuber k khan
2024	Mehfil se uth jayenge	Altamash faridi	Featuring; Priya shukla & Ujjwwal sharma
2024	O re khuda	Shibani kashyap & Punit sharma	Featuring; Shivani sharma

== Webseries ==
Year	Title	Role	Language	Notes	ref
2024	fatal chapter 1	Maddy	Hindi	Season 1	
2024	Naagvadhu	Pratap	Hindi	ALTBalaji	
2024	Apni Khaki		Hindi		
2024	Shiddat Mohabbat Ki	alok	Hindi	Season 1 & 2	
