= Basant Bhatt =

Indian television actor (born 1994)

- Born: 23 January 1994 (age 32); Bageshwar, Uttarakhand, India
- Occupation: Actor
- Years active: 2012–present
- Known for: Suryaputra Karn; Vighnaharta Ganesh; RadhaKrishn; Shrimad Ramayan

Basant Bhatt (born 23 January 1994) is an Indian actor who works in Hindi television. He made his acting debut with Arjun, playing Varun. Bhatt is best known for his portrayals of Karn in Suryaputra Karn, Kartikeya in Vighnaharta Ganesh, Balram in RadhaKrishn and Lakshman in Shrimad Ramayan.

== Filmography ==
=== Television ===
Year	Title	Role	Notes	Ref.
2012	Har Yug Mein Aayega Ek – Arjun	Varun	Episode 6	
2015	Suryaputra Karn	Karn	Lead Role	
2016	Suryaputra Karn	Vrishasen		
2015	Crime Patrol	Rohit	One episode	
2017–2021	Vighnaharta Ganesh	Kartikeya	Supporting Role	
2018–2023	RadhaKrishn	Balram / Sheshnaag	Lead Role	
2021	Haathi Ghoda Paalki, Jai Kanhaiya Lal Ki	Sheshnaag		
2024–2025	Shrimad Ramayan	Lakshman/ Sheshnaag	Lead Role	

== Awards and nominations ==
Year	Award	Category	Work	Result	Ref.
2019	Indian Telly Awards	Best Actor in a Supporting Role	RadhaKrishn	Nominated	
