= Roshan Kumar Rao =

Indian cricketer (born 1993)

Personal information
- Born: 28 December 1993 (age 32); Nabarangpur, Odisha, India
- Batting: Right handed
- Role: Wicketkeeper

Domestic team information
- Years: Team
- 2017–18: Odisha
- Source: Cricinfo, 8 February 2018

Roshan Kumar Rao (born 28 December 1993) is an Indian cricketer. He made his List A debut for Odisha in the 2017–18 Vijay Hazare Trophy on 8 February 2018. He made his first-class debut for Odisha in the 2018–19 Ranji Trophy on 14 December 2018.
