= Mahabharat (2013 TV series) =

Indian television series

- Genre: Mythology
- Created by: Siddharth Kumar Tewary
- Based on: Mahabharata by Vyasa
- Written by: Siddharth Kumar Tewary; Sharmin Joseph; Radhika Anand; Anand Vardhan; Mihir Bhuta
- Directed by: Siddharth Anand Kumar; Amarprith G; Mukesh Kumar Singh; Kamal Monga; Loknath Pandey
- Creative director: Amol Surve
- Starring: See below
- Narrated by: Saurabh Raj Jain
- Theme music composer: Ajay–Atul
- Composers: Jitesh Panchal; Lenin Nandi; Sushant Pawar
- Country of origin: India
- Original language: Hindi
- No. of seasons: 1
- No. of episodes: 267

Production
- Producers: Siddharth Kumar Tewary; Rahul Kumar Tewary
- Editor: Paresh Shah
- Camera setup: Multi camera
- Running time: 22 minutes 45 minutes (for introductory episode)
- Production company: Swastik Productions

Original release
- Network: StarPlus
- Release: 16 September 2013 – 16 August 2014

Mahabharat is a 2013 Indian epic mythological television series based on the Sanskrit epic Mahabharata. It aired from 16 September 2013 to 16 August 2014 on Star Plus. The series is available digitally on Disney+ Hotstar. Produced by Swastik Productions Pvt. Ltd, it starred Saurabh Raj Jain, Pooja Sharma, Shaheer Sheikh, Arpit Ranka and Aham Sharma.

== Premise ==
The story begins with Bhishma, the son of King Shantanu and Ganga, who is crowned as the heir to the throne of Hastinapura. When Shantanu falls in love with Satyavati, a fisherwoman, she agrees to marry him only on the condition that her children will inherit the throne. To fulfill his father's wish, Bhishma takes a vow of lifelong celibacy and renounces his claim to the throne. Moved by his sacrifice, Shantanu grants Bhishma the boon of Ichchha Mrityu (death at will). Shantanu and Satyavati marry and have two sons, Chitrangada and Vichitravirya.

25 years later, Chitrangada dies, leaving Vichitravirya as the sole heir. On Satyavati’s command, Bhishma abducts the three princesses of Kashi Kingdom—Amba, Ambika, and Ambalika—for Vichitravirya. However, Amba, who was already in love with another, refuses to marry Vichitravirya. When her lover rejects her, she seeks vengeance against Bhishma. She pleads for help from Bhishma’s guru, Parashurama, but their battle is halted by Shiva. Determined to be the cause of Bhishma’s downfall, Amba immolates herself, vowing to be reborn for her revenge.

Vichitravirya dies without an heir. To continue the lineage, Satyavati calls upon her firstborn son, Veda Vyasa—born to her before her marriage—to impregnate the widowed queens using the niyoga practice. Ambika gives birth to Dhritarashtra, who is blind, Ambalika gives birth to Pandu, who is pale, and a maid, Parishrami, bears Vidura.

25 years later, Amba is reborn as Shikhandini, the daughter of Drupada, destined to bring about Bhishma’s death. Meanwhile, Bhishma secures a marriage alliance for Dhritarashtra by proposing to Gandhari, the daughter of Subala, King of Gandhara, due to her divine boon of bearing a hundred sons. When Gandhari learns that her husband-to-be is blind, she blinds herself with a cloth to share his fate. Her brother, Shakuni, enraged by this turn of events, swears revenge on Bhishma and injures his own leg as a mark of his vengeance. Initially, Dhritarashtra resents Gandhari for her decision but later accepts her as his wife.

Despite being the eldest, Dhritarashtra is denied the throne due to his blindness, and Pandu is crowned king instead. Pandu marries Kunti, the princess of the Kunti Kingdom, and Madri, the princess of the Madra Kingdom. However, after accidentally killing a sage, Kindama, Pandu is cursed to die if he ever attempts to be intimate with his wives. Heartbroken, he renounces the throne and retreats to the forest with Kunti and Madri, leaving Dhritarashtra to rule Hastinapura in his absence. 15 months later, Gandhari was pregnant for more than a year which angers Dhritarashta. Kunti uses her boon, given to her by Sage Durvasa, to invoke gods of her choice and obtain children from them. She begets Yudhishthira from Yama (the god of death and righteousness), Bhima from Vayu (the god of wind), Arjuna from Indra (the king of the gods). She also chants the boon for Madri, and Madri obtains twins - Nakula and Sahadeva - from the Ashwini Kumaras. Gandhari is upset as Dhritrashtra becomes impatient and gives birth to a lump of flesh. But this is cut into 101 pieces by Veda Vyasa, and these pieces eventually transform into children - the 100 Kauravas (led by Duryodhana) and a daughter, Dushala.

Years later, Pandu becomes captivated by the beauty of Madri and engages in sexual intercourse with her. Madri, despite her best efforts, is unable to fend him off from the act. As a result of the sage's curse, Pandu dies. Attributing her husband's death to herself, Madri dies out of grief. Pandavas return to Hastinapur with Kunti, after the death of Pandu and Madri. The Kauravas grow up to be evil, led by their eldest brother Duryodhana, who is highly influenced by his maternal uncle Shakuni, contrary to the Pandavas who are righteous. They conspired against the Pandavas. Shakuni tries to poison Bheema, but he is saved by his great-grandfather Naag Raj. Bhishma banishes Shakuni from Hastinapur, forcing him to return to Gandhar. All princes are sent to study under Guru Dronacharya where Dronacharya teaches everyone about warfare including his son Ashwatthama.

== Cast ==
=== Main ===
- Sourabh Raaj Jain as Krishna: a leader of the Yadava clan and an incarnation of the god Vishnu, born to restore dharma on the Earth. He serves as both a mentor and a philosopher, shaping the course of the war and the events leading up to it through his counsel and divine interventions. Even before his direct participation in the central narrative, Krishna is depicted in a divine form in the concluding segments of each episode, where he interprets the events, relates them to daily life, and imparts moral teachings and philosophical insights. Other than few initial concern regarding his tall height and complexion, Jain stated that playing Krishna was not a challenge for him, as he remained focused on himself and welcomed the comparisons with past portrayals. Jain also expressed that he saw himself merely as a conduit for the audience, stating "I was just a medium, an actor who humbly folded his hands before every scene, seeking the purity it deserved. The experience was truly inspiring for me". Kunwar Vikram Soni portrays adolescent Krishna.
- Shaheer Sheikh as Arjuna: the third of the five Pandava brothers, who is a master archer and a warrior of great skill and integrity. His internal conflicts are often guided by Krishna to help him fulfil his duty and uphold dharma, particularly in the Kurukshetra War, where Krishna imparts the Bhagavad Gita. Sheikh underwent significant physical and mental preparation and emphasised the depth of his engagement with the character's internal struggles, which made the role "emotionally draining" and the pressure of playing the character was initially overwhelming and pushed him beyond his limits. He also described the experience as more than just acting, saying, "It wasn’t just about acting—it was about embodying the essence of a hero who represents strength, honor, and devotion". Soumya Singh portrays young Arjuna.
- Pooja B Sharma as Draupadi: The princess of Panchala, who becomes the common wife of the five Pandava brothers and later the empress of Indraprastha, and subsequently, the Kuru kingdom. Born from fire, she is prophesied to bring upheaval to the lands of Aryavarta, and her life is marked by hardships, including the cheer haran (disrobing episode) where she is humiliated in the court of Kuru Kingdom. The event becomes one of the catalysts for the great war. Sharma described the character as a "strong, just, dignified woman with a strong sense of self". She found the role physically and emotionally demanding, especially the cheer harana episode. She also highlighted how this version deeply explored Draupadi’s bond with Krishna, a dynamic which was just merely established in previous adaptations. Despite the challenges, she found the experience enriching and transformative, stating, "Draupadi's character was powerful for me and it made me strong".
- Arpit Ranka as Duryodhana: the eldest of the hundred Kaurava brothers, and Kuru kingdom’s crown prince, whose desire for power, pride and enmity with the Pandavas fuels the Kurukshetra War. Transitioning to television, Ranka was initially hesitant to accept the role of Duryodhana but was convinced by the show's creator, Siddharth Kumar Tewary, after understanding the project's grandeur. He described Duryodhana as a powerful character with depth, stating, "I think Duryodhan is the most powerful character of Mahabharat, and I feel that I have certain qualities of Duryodhana. Whatever Duryodhan has done he has a reason for that. Maybe I would have reacted the same way like Duryodhan." Alam Khan portrays young Duryodhana.
- Aham Sharma as Karna: the premarital son of the sun god Surya and Kunti, the mother of the Pandavas, who is abandoned at birth and raised by a charioteer couple. Despite his exceptional archery skills, he is denied opportunities due to his perceived low birth, but finds acceptance in Duryodhana, who crowns him king of Anga. Karna becomes the rival of Arjuna, even after learning he is the Pandavas' elder half-brother. Cast later than others, Sharma deeply immersed himself in Karna’s struggles, finding emotionally intense scenes, like his final conversation with Kunti, particularly draining. Sharma saw Karna as a resilient figure who never wavered in his beliefs despite social rejection. Vidyut Xavier portrays adolescent Karna.
- Rohit Bhardwaj as Yudhishthira: the eldest Pandava, born to Kunti through the god Dharma, and a paragon of justice. He becomes the emperor of Indraprastha and later the Kuru kingdom. Bhardwaj appreciated portraying Yudhishthira as a ruler who maintains patience and composure, navigating complex emotions while asserting his rightful place as king, fully aware of his capabilities, and striving to validate them through his principles.
- Saurav Gurjar as Bhima: the second Pandava, born to Kunti through the wind god Vayu. He is known for his strength and fiery nature, who ultimately kills all the Kauravas in the war. Initially selected for the role due to his physique rather than acting experience, Gurjar participated in acting workshops to develop his skills and researched about his character. Gurjar also noted his background in combat sports facilitated the execution of intense fight sequences. Miraj Joshi portrays young Bhima.
- Vin Rana as Nakula: the fourth Pandava, who is known for his beauty, healing abilities, housekeeping and skill in swordsmanship. Nakula is the twin brother of Sahadeva, born to Pandu's second wife Madri through Ashvins. Devish Ahuja portrays young Nakula.
- Lavanya Bhardwaj as Sahadeva: the twin brother of Nakula and the fifth Pandava, who is notable for his wisdom and healing abilities. Rudhraksh Jaiswal portrays young Sahadeva.
- Arav Chowdhary as Bhishma: the son of King Shantanu and the goddess Ganga, who is the revered grandsire of the Kuru dynasty, bound by a vow of celibacy and lifelong loyalty to Hastinapur. Despite his support for the Pandavas, his vow binds him to the Kaurava side, ultimately leading him to become the commander-in-chief of their forces in the Kurukshetra War. To bring originality, Chowdharry avoided watching past portrayals, focusing instead on Bhishma’s emotional conflicts, humility and transformation from a young prince to an aged, revered elder. As the character aged, Chowdharry refined his voice, posture, and expressions.
- Praneet Bhat as Shakuni: the prince of Gandhara, who acts as the cunning strategist behind the plans of his nephew, Duryodhana, driven by a deep-seated grudge against the Kuru kingdom for forcing his sister, Gandhari, into marriage with a blind prince. Bhat’s portrayal was shaped by his distinctive interpretation of the character, including the characters appearance and mannerism. Rather than depicting Shakuni as a mere villain, Bhat saw him as a devoted brother seeking retribution for the injustices faced by his family.
- Shafaq Naaz as Kunti: the mother to the Pandavas who possesses a divine boon allowing her to invoke gods to bear children. Before her marriage, she uses it to bear Karna, and later, at the request of her husband Pandu, she invokes the gods to bear Yudhishthira, Bhima, and Arjuna. After the death of Pandu and her co-wife, Kunti raises her sons and step-sons equally, ensuring their unity. Naaz found aspects of the role personally relatable, particularly in terms of emotional depth, patience, and understanding, considering herself as the modern version of the character. Despite being 20 years old at the time, her performance was noted for capturing the character’s maturity.
- Thakur Anoop Singh as Dhritarashtra: the blind king of Hastinapur, who is the husband of Gandhari and father of the hundred Kauravas. Singh viewed Dhritarashtra as a multifaceted character torn between his duties as a king and his affections as a father. Understanding the complexities of playing a blind character, Singh dedicated himself to mastering the nuances required for the role, emphasising the importance of body language and expressions in conveying emotions without the use of sight.
- Riya Deepsi as Gandhari: the princess of Gandhara and the wife of Dhritarashtra, who blindfolds herself as a mark of wifely devotion. Despite her virtues, she is unable to guide her sons, the Kauravas. Initially offered the role of Madri, 17-year-old Deepsi was ultimately cast as Gandhari, despite concerns about her age. Deepsi found the role challenging as it concealed what her family and friends considered her most beautiful feature. Relying on body language to convey emotions, she credited her four years of theatre experience for helping her adapt to the role’s complexities.
- Nirbhay Wadhwa as Dushasana: the second of the Kauravas, who serves as Duryodhana’s brother and loyal follower, infamous for his role in Draupadi’s humiliation.

=== Recurring ===
- Sayantani Ghosh as Satyavati: a fisherwoman who marries King Shantanu after securing a promise that her future son will inherit the throne. Satyavati rises to become the matriarch of the Kuru dynasty and is the great-grandmother of the Pandavas and Kauravas. Discussing the prominence of Satyavati’s character in the series, Ghosh stated that while many associate the Mahabharata solely with the Pandavas and Kauravas, it also encompasses deeper narratives, such as Satyavati’s, which are crucial to the epic yet often overlooked.
- Sameer Dharmadhikari as Shantanu: King of Hastinapur, Ganga and Satyavati's husband and Bhishma, Chitrangada and Vichtravirya's father.
- Vivana Singh as Devi Ganga: A river goddess who marries Shantanu, and the mother of Bhishma.
- Atul Mishra as Ved Vyas: Satyavati and Maharishi Parashara's son and Dhritarashtra, Pandu and Vidura's surrogate father.
- Aryamann Seth as Vichitravirya: King Shantanu and Queen Satyavati's son, Chitrangad's younger brother, and Ambika and Ambalika's husband.
- Ratan Rajput as Amba: The eldest of the three princesses of Kashi, who were abducted by Bhishma for Vichitravirya. Rejected by her lover, Shalva, and Vichitravirya, she vows revenge against Bhishma for her misfortune, and is reborn as Shikhandini to ensure his downfall.
- Aparna Dixit as Ambika: Vichitravirya's first wife and Dhritarashtra's mother.
- Mansi Sharma as Ambalika: Vichitravirya's second wife and Pandu's mother.
- Puneet Issar as Parshurama: The sixth avatar of Lord Vishnu and the teacher of Bhishma, Drona, and Karna
- Arun Singh Rana as Pandu: The younger brother of Dhritarashtra, who became the king of Hastinapura due to former's blindness, until his renouncement of the throne. Pandu's inability to have children led him to seek the intervention of the gods, who granted him sons through his wives Kunti and Madri, making him the acknowledged father of the Pandavas.
- Suhani Dhanki as Madri: the princess of Madra and the second wife of Pandu. She is the mother of Nakula and Sahadeva and entrusted them to Kunti’s care before her death alongside Pandu.
- Naveen Jinger as Vidura: the wise prime minister of Hastinapur and the half-brother of Dhritarashtra and Pandu.
- Nissar Khan as Drona: a warrior sage and the royal preceptor of the Pandavas and Kauravas. He is devoted to his role as mentor of the Kuru Kingdom, eventually becoming the second commander-in-chief of the Kaurava side during Kurukshetra War.
- Ankit Mohan as Ashwatthama: a fierce warrior and son of Drona. He is loyal to Duryodhana, and takes his vengeance after the Kurukshetra War.
- Sudesh Berry as Drupada: The King of Panchala, and the father of Shikhandini, Dhristadyumna, and Draupadi. He is involved in a longstanding feud with Drona.
- Karan Suchak as Dhrishtadyumna: the twin brother of Draupadi, who is born from the fire to bring the end of Drona. Dhrishtadyumna serves as the commander of the Pandava forces during the Kurukshetra War.
- Shikha Singh as Shikhandini: the daughter of Drupada and the reincarnation of Amba. Raised as a male warrior with the mission of bringing about Bhishma's downfall, she ultimately exchanges her sex with a Yaksha to fully participate in battle.
- Tarun Khanna as Balrama: Krishna's elder brother and a teacher of Bhima and Duryodhana. Vedant Sawant as Adolescent Balarama
- Veebha Anand as Subhadra: an incarnation of goddess Yogamaya and the half-sister of Krishna. She marries Arjuna and gives birth to Abhimanyu.
- Paras Arora as Abhimanyu: The young son of Arjuna and Subhadra. Though he is killed during the Kurukshetra War, the Pandavas' lineage continued with his son, Parikshit.
- Kaushik Chakravorty as Shalya: King of Madra and Madri's elder brother.
- Hemant Choudhary as Kripa: Royal teacher of Kauravas and Pandavas.
- Ajay Mishra as Sanjaya: Dhritarashtra's advisor and charioteer.
- Sandeep Arora as Vikarna: a Kaurava prince, notable for opposing Duryodhana during the cheer haran. Raj Anadkat played young Vikarna
- Ali Hassan as Jayadratha: the King of Sindhu Kingdom and the brother-in-law of the Kauravas.
  - Hassan also portrayed Takshak: Nagraj and Ruler of Takshila who killed Arjuna's grandson Parikshit.
- Nazea Hasan Sayed as Vrushali: the wife of Karna
- Vaishnavi Dhanraj as Hidimbā: A Rakshasi and the first wife of Bheema.
- Ketan Karande as Ghatotkacha: Bheema and Himdimbā's son, who was killed by Karna during the war.
- Pallavi Subhash as Rukmini: the princess of Vidharbha, and the chief queen-consort of Krishna
- Gurpreet Singh as Rukmi: the crown prince of Vidharbha and Rukmini's brother.
- Rio Kapadia as Subala: King of Gandhara and the father of Shakuni and Gandhari
- Shweta Gautam as Sudharma: Queen of Gandhar, Subala's wife and Shakuni and Gandhari's mother.
- Garima Jain as Dushala: the princess of Kuru Kingdom and the only sister of the Kauravas, who married Jayadrath. Ashnoor Kaur plays as young Dushala
- Ananya Agarwal as Malini: Draupadi's little friend.
- Anju Jadhav as Sukhada: Gandhari's maid and Yuyutsu's mother.
- Jayantika Sengupta as Arshi: Shakuni's wife.
- Chandani Sharma as Kripi: Drona's wife, Ashwathama's mother, and Kripa's twin sister.
- Bhakti Chauhan as Priyamvada: Kunti's friend like maid
- Kanishka Soni as Parashvi: Vidura's wife.
- Tinu Verma as Jarasandha: King of Magadha, killed by Bheem.
- Joy Mathur as Shishupala: Krishna's cousin and Duryodhana's friend.
- Raj Premi as Kalayavan: A demon king who was fetched to death by Krishna.
- Deepak Jethi as Virata: the King of Matsya Kingdom, at whose court the Pandavas spent their last year of exile
- Mallika Nayak as Sudeshna: Virata's wife and the mother of Uttara and Uttar.
- Rumi Khan as Kichaka: Commander-in-chief of Matsya and Sudeshna's brother
- Richa Mukherjee as Uttarā: King Virata and Queen Sudeshna's daughter, Uttar's younger sister, Abhimanyu's wife, and Parikshit's mother.
- Pravisht Mishra as Uttar: Virata and Sudeshna's son and Uttara's brother.
- Niel Satpuda as Prativindhya: Yudhishthira and Draupadi's son and the Eldest Upapandava.
- Aman Sharma as Sutasoma: Bheema and Draupadi's son.
- Yash Joshi as Shrutakarma: Arjuna and Draupadi's son.
- Jay Joshi as Shatanika: Nakula and Draupadi's son.
- Akshay Batchua as Shrutasena: Sahadeva and Draupadi's son.
- Ketaki Kadam as Radha: a milkmaid who was Krishna's lover during his adolescence.
- Preeti Puri as Devaki: Vasudev's wife, Kansa's sister, and Krishna's mother.
- Vandana Singh as Yashoda: Krishna's foster mother.
- Akhilendra Mishra as Kansa: Devaki's elder brother and Krishna's maternal uncle.
- Yagya Saxena as Eklavya: A devoted student of Drona who gives away his thumb as Guru Dakshina.
- Mohit Raina / Amit Mehra as Lord Shiva: Known as the 'destroyer', a part of the Trinity;Supreme Being
- Sachin Verma / Nikhil Arya as Lord Indra: God of rains, King of heaven and Bali and Arjuna's father.
- Sandeep Rajora as Lord Surya: Lord Sun and Sugriva and Karna's father.
- Kunal Bhatia as Lord Agni: God of fire.
- Vishal Kotian as Lord Hanuman: Rama's devotee, Vayu's son, and Bheema's elder spiritual brother.
- Manish Bishla as Chitrasena (Kaurava): A son of Dhritarashtra and Gandhari, a Kaurava, he was killed by Bhima
- Aayush Shah as young Ashwatthama

== Production ==
=== Background ===
In November 2005, a report from Variety stated Bobby Bedi's plan to make three feature films and 100 hours of television programming on Indian epic Mahabharat under Kaleidoscope Entertainment with the television version planned to be delivered by the end of 2007. In 2006 it was revealed making for Star Plus which was to be directed by Chandraprakash Dwivedi. It was a part of Bedi's 360 degree approach to the epic through TV, film, gaming and theme parks. Planned for 100 episodes with new actors, it was planned to premiere in March 2008 but got postpone due to production to August 2008 and later January 2009.

During this, Ekta Kapoor was simultaneously producing a series on Mahabharat since January 2008 titled Kahaani Hamaarey Mahaabhaarat Ki for a rival channel to premiere in mid 2008 which she earlier planned for Star but could not as the channel roped Bedi. This led to a pressure in the production as they wanted to rush their premiere before Kapoor, due to which Dwivedi quit midway after association with them for two years, after which three directors were working on it. But, they were not able to rush up the series before Kapoor's. 50 episodes were shot at the sets created in Morna between Noida and Delhi for a year after paying ₹6 Crores. However, as the channel was not satisfied with those episodes, they were asked to rework the entire series again pushing its premiere to 2009. But, Bedi reportedly started selling it in DVDs which created problems between them and the channel, and the production was stalled. However, in December 2008, Star took Bedi to Bombay High Court filing an arbitration petition alleging that the production house took ₹6 Crore for the production of the series in advance but has not produced even a single episode while a senior executive from the production house stated, " This legal notice is Star's way of pulling out of the show. Maybe it doesn't want to go ahead with the Mahabharat project after all." After these, the shooting was expected to restart from February 2009 but in mid 2009 the production was cancelled and the project was given over to Siddharth Kumar Tewary's Swastik Productions to start fresh.

=== Development ===
It took us four years of research and brainstorming sessions to conceive and execute the show.

— Siddharth Kumar Tewary

More than 400 people were involved in production with 200 people working on graphics. Renowned author Devdutt Pattanaik was roped as the chief consultant and guiding person for the series. Also writer Salim Khan, music directors Ajay-Atul and Ismail Darbar and action director Ram Shetty were involved.

Speaking about bringing Mahabharat to television again, Star Plus senior vice-president Nikhil Madhok said, "With over 20 years having passed since the telecast of Mahabharat serial on Doordarshan, we felt that the younger generation should be re-introduced to this epic. Also, the plot of this epic is open to interpretation and has many intricacies in it, unlike that of let's say Ramayan, which is fairly linear and is passed on from generation to generation."

According to producer Siddharth Kumar Tewary, the Draupadi cheer haran (disrobing) sequence, which Tewary himself directed, took 20 days to shoot.

Even in the last fight between Bheema and Duryodhana, the actors shared that the scene took 3 days to shoot.

Originally planned for 128 episodes, its growing popularity gave an extension for about 100 more episodes as Tewary wanted to explore the story further in January 2014. However, it ended with 267 episodes.

=== Design ===
The set covering 10 acres of land in Umargam, Valsad, Gujarat was designed by the art director Omung Kumar.

The costume designer of the series Nidhi Yasha along with her consultant Bhanu Athaiya, had referred 450 books related to period textiles, costume and jewellery.

Different ancient techniques have been used to achieve the various looks. A lot of bright coloured silks, handlooms, gold and jewellery structured embroidery patterns have been used.

— Bhanu Athaiya

It took a study of over 450 books related to period textiles, costume and jewelry and four years of hard-work to arrive at the current look and feel of the show. An extensive study on jewelry structures according to ethnicity, fabrics, drapes and costume was undertaken.

— Nidhi Yasha

=== Marketing and budget ===
Star spent ₹5.1 billion (US$53 million) on the project and spent another ₹410 million (US$4.3 million) on marketing the show, making it India's most expensive TV series. As a part of marketing, Star constructed Mahabharat museum across malls in cities consisting selective weapons, jewellery and finery of Mahabharat along with 3D virtual tour of the sets of Hastinapur. In towns the same concept was adapted with wheels-canter vans along with LED.

The sets of the series at Umargam in Gujarat cost ₹100 crores and production costs of ₹13-15 Lakhs per day.

=== Filming ===
The series was mainly shot in the sets at Umargam, Valsad in Gujarat. Shooting also took place in various exotic locations such as Jaisalmer, Amber Palace in Jaipur, Kashmir, Ahmedabad, Jabalpur in Madhya Pradesh, Nepal and Sri Lanka.

=== Training ===
The actors shared that they had to go through acting workshops and various trainings for about a year where they were explained in detail what to do and how. Rajit Kapur trained the actors by conducting acting workshops.

== Soundtrack ==
Mahabharat

Soundtrack album by Ajay-Atul
- Released: 4 September 2013 (TV Series)
- Recorded: 2013
- Language: Hindi
- Labels: Sangeet Music; T-Series

No.	Title	Length
1.	"Hai Katha Sangram Ki (Theme Song)"	4:07
2.	"Ek Maa Ki Santane - Ye Kaisi Duvidha Hai (Sad - Theme)"	3:00
3.	"Jagat Mein Samay Maha Balwan"	3:33
4.	"Krishna Manmohana (Krishna theme song 1)"	6:58
5.	"Murli Manohar Mohan Murali (Krishna theme song 2)"	4:21
6.	"Shri Krishna Govind Hare Murari (Krishna theme song 3)"	3:15
7.	"Yada Yada Dharmasya"	2:24
8.	"Gandhiv Dhaari Arjuna (Arjun's Gandiva theme song)"	2:25
9.	"Paarthasya Dhananjaya"	1:15
10.	"Kumari Chaapi Panchali (Draupadi theme song)"	4:15
11.	"Rahega Atal Mera Mann"	3:21
12.	"Arjuna Draupadi Theme"	3:32
13.	"Suryadev So Gaye"	4:56
14.	"Suryaputra Karna Theme"	3:35
15.	"Shakuni Theme: Yukti Kapat Chhal"	1:30
16.	"Abhimanyu Theme"	3:30
17.	"Vande Dronacharya"	1:05
18.	"Bhishma Theme"	1:28
19.	"Parshuram Theme"	1:20
20.	"Yeh Dharma Yudh Hai"	1:00
21.	"Yudh Yeh Vinash Hai"	2:25

== Reception ==
=== Critics' response ===
Writing for Rediff, Nishi Tiwari wrote that "If it maintains the quality of writing and able actors who portray key characters, we may have another winner among us". DNA India praised the costumes, scenery, Krishna's flute theme which was given by Raj Mohan Sinha, and most of the CGI special effects, but said the serial's pace was too fast.

Hindustan Times criticised, "Everything is so exaggerated that you feel you are watching a series of unreal events rather than following a deeply emotional story. Even relatively less important moments are treated with such overblown drama that when you really need the drama at crucial junctures — such as Bheeshma’s brahmacharya pledge — the impact is lost." The background music was also criticised for being loud all the time.

=== Viewership in India ===
Its premiere had a viewership of approximately 8.4 million impressions (8.445 TVTs - Television Viewership in Thousands) and 4.09 TVR. That week it averaged 6.356 TVTs. The show has become the highest rated weekday epic show in the last three years on Indian television. The viewership ratings of the week of 1 December 2013 reached 9.801 TVTs. The game of dice leading to Draupadi's 'cheer haran' took Mahabharat at its peak viewership (10 TVMs) and helped the broadcasting channel Star Plus clock one of the highest GTVMs. Overall, it became the tenth most watched Hindi GEC of 2013 with an average viewership of 5.6 million and a peak viewership of 7.2 million.

In week 29 of 2014, it was at fifth position with 7.1 TVTs while the following week it jumped to second position with 9.2 TVTs.

The show was listed in the list of top 20 TV series of all time in 2016.

During the COVID-19 outbreak and lockdown in India, it started re-airing on Star Plus from 30 March 2020 to 25 July 2020. It soon became one of the most-watched Hindi GEC series featuring in the top five programs even during the re-run.

== Impact ==
This series is regarded as the costliest show ever launched by StarPlus and one of the costliest Indian television series, being the first Indian television show to be made on a budget more than ₹100 crores.

In 2014, the cast of Mahabharat were invited to hold a fan meeting tour at Jakarta and Bali. The Times of India reported that the show has a huge fan following abroad and as result, the prominent characters from the show had been called to Indonesia for a special event. The main casts of Mahabharat, performed on "Mahabharat Show: Fan Meeting Tour" in the year 2014 .

In June 2020, Karnataka Chief Minister Yediyurappa then, on watching the Kannada dubbed version appreciated the series and stated that the character Krishna played by Saurabh Raj Jain impressed him and also stated that just like every Mahabharata.

== Awards and nominations ==
It won the trophy for the Best Drama in Star Guild Awards 2013 as well as number of accolades in other award shows. Show won Best Historical/Mythological serial award in Indian Television Academy Awards. It won the Indian Telly Awards for Actor in a Supporting Role (Drama), given to Aham Sharma for his portrayal as Karna, and Actor in a Negative Role to Praneet Bhat in 2014. The crew members also won the awards for Best Costumes for a TV Programme, Best Make – Up Artist, and Best Stylist.

Year	Award	Category	Recipient	Result	Ref(s)
2014	Star Guild Awards	Best Ensemble Cast	Siddharth Kumar Tewary	Won	
2014	Star Guild Awards	Best Mythological Series	Mahabharat	Won	
2014	Indian Television Academy Awards	Best Visual Effects	Swastik Productions	Won	
2014	Indian Television Academy Awards	Best Actor - Popular	Shaheer Sheikh	Nominated	
2014	Indian Television Academy Awards	Best Historical/Mythological Serial	Mahabharat	Won	
2014	Indian Telly Award	Best Actor in a Lead Role	Saurabh Raj Jain	Nominated	
2014	Indian Telly Award	Best Actor in a Lead Role	Shaheer Sheikh	Nominated	
2014	Indian Telly Award	Best Actress in a Lead Role	Pooja Sharma	Nominated	
2014	Indian Telly Award	Best Actor in a Supporting Role	Aham Sharma	Won	
2014	Indian Telly Award	Best Actor in a Supporting Role	Aarav Chowdhary	Nominated	
2014	Indian Telly Award	Best Actor in a Supporting Role	Rohit Bhardwaj	Nominated	
2014	Indian Telly Award	Best Actress in a Supporting Role	Shafaq Naaz	Nominated	
2014	Indian Telly Award	Best Actor in a Negative Role	Praneet Bhat	Won	
2014	Indian Telly Award	Best Actor in a Negative Role	Arpit Ranka	Nominated	
2014	Indian Telly Award	Best Costumes for a TV Program	Bhanu Athaiya	Won	
2014	Indian Telly Award	Best Makeup Artist	G. A. Jamesh	Won	
2014	Indian Telly Award	Best Ensemble	Sidharth Kumar Tewary	Won	
2014	Indian Telly Award	Best Stylist	Shweta Korde	Won	
2014	Gold Awards	Best Actor in a Lead Role	Shaheer Sheikh	Nominated	

== See also ==
- List of programs broadcast by StarPlus
