= Aditi Sajwan =

Indian soap opera actress

- Occupations: Model; actress
- Known for: Jai Shri Krishna; Baal Veer; Chidiya Ghar

Aditi Sajwan is an Indian television actress. She made her debut in Zee TV's Meri Doli Tere Angana. Later, she entered Imagine TV's Raajkumar Aaryyan to play the role of Mayasheen. She played Yashoda in Jai Shri Krishna and was seen in and as Meera. She has also acted in shows like Hamari Saass Leela, Baalveer, Piya Ka Ghar Pyaara Lage, and Chidiya Ghar.

== Filmography ==
=== Television ===
Year	Title	Role	Notes
2007	Meri Doli Tere Angana	Arpita	
2008–2009	Jai Shri Krishna	Yashoda	
2008	Raajkumar Aaryyan	Mayasheen	
2009–2010	Meera	Meera	
2010	Lakshmi Mahima	Lakshmi	TV movie
2011	Hamari Saas Leela	Koyal	
2012	Fear Files	Nikhat Mariam Nirusha	
2013	Fear Files	Sandhya	
2012–2014	Baal Veer	Natkhat Pari	
2012–2013	Piya Ka Ghar Pyaara Lage	Roop	
2014	Ek Hasina Thi	Nitya Mitra	
2014	Singhasan Battisi	Jailaxmi	
2014–2017	Chidiya Ghar	Koyal Ghotak Narayan	
2015	Kabhi Aise Geet Gaya Karo	Shammi	
2020	Akbar Ka Bal Birbal	Rani Sahiba / Maharani	
2021–2022	Jai Kanhaiya Lal Ki	Yashoda	
