= Paundraka Vasudeva =

Puranic figure

Paundraka Vāsudēva
- Bhagavata Purana character
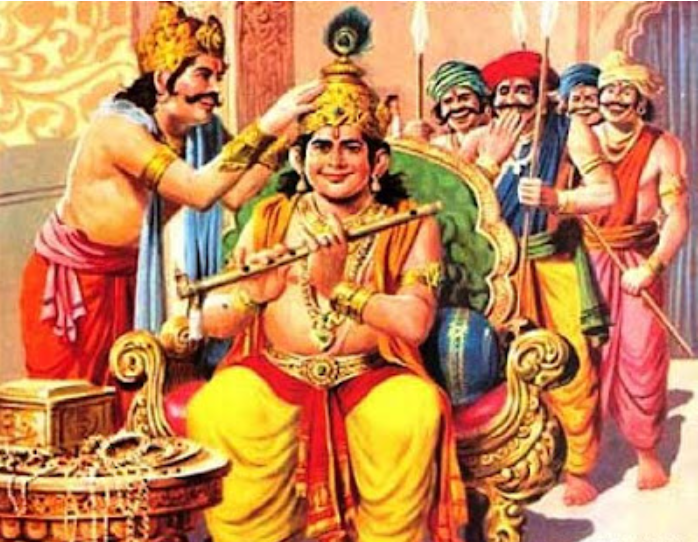
- Paundraka Vasudeva impersonating Shri Krishna

In-universe information
- Affiliation: The king of Kashi, The king of Pundra, False Vāsudēva Krishna
- Weapon: False discus, false mace, false conch of Vishnu
- Family: Vasudeva (father) Sutana (mother) Krishna (step-brother) Balrama (step-brother) Subhadra (step-sister)

Paundraka Vāsudēva was an antagonist to Krishna appearing in the Mahabharata, Bhagavata Purana, and other Hindu Puranas. Across these various sources, his character ranges from a shadowy rival king ruling over the Pundras, Vangas, and Kiratas, to the archetype of a false god who claimed a divine identity as Purushottama (the Supreme Person, or God), by adopting Krishna's insignias and patronymic epithet (Vasudeva). Later he was killed by Krishna in battle.

== In the Mahabharata ==
When Krishna describes Jarasandha and his allies to Yudhishthira in Mahabharata 2.13 (Sabha Parva, section 13), he introduces an evil-minded king who had aligned himself with the Chedis (a kingdom ruled by another antagonist of Krishna, Shishupala). Krishna characterizes this king (Paundraka) as a powerful ruler who out of delusion constantly adopts Krishna's own personal insignias and falsely claims to be Purushottama. Beyond this description, Paundraka’s presence in the epic is sparse: he is briefly mentioned as an attendee at Draupadi’s svayamvara (Mahābhārata 1.177), and later, Bhima is stated to have defeated the "lord of the Pundras" during his eastern military campaign (Mahābhārata 2.27.16) as part of Yudhishthira's Rajasuya. Paundrak is also referenced as an attendee of the rajasuya (consecration) ceremony. The Mahabharata itself has no account of any direct battle between Krishna and Paundraka.

== In the Puranas ==
One version, in the Vayu Purana (2.34.183–4), calls Paundraka Vasudeva a son of Vasudeva, which would account for the patronymic. Most other puranas, however, simply show him arrogantly adopting the name Vasudeva himself, claiming to be Vishnu incarnate. In Puranic texts he is not explicitly connected to the land of Pundra, leading scholars to read his name "Paundraka" as a reference to his adoption of the sectarian forehead marking (Urdhva Pundra) of Vasudeva. Instead of describing his sovereignty over Pundra, the Puranas associate him with Varanasi (Kashi), either ruling the city himself or serving as a close ally of its king.

According to the Vishnu Purana (5.34), Paundraka sent a messenger to Krishna at Dvaraka, demanding that he give up his powerful weapon, the Sudarshana. The Bhagavata Purana 10.66 explicitly presents Paundraka's message to Krishna as an ultimatum to submit and stop imitating him via use of his symbols, or else to give him battle. Krishna responds by surrounding Kashi with an army, releasing the sudarshana chakra, and cutting Paundraka to pieces. He then kills the king of Kashi with arrows and returns home.

== Interpretation ==
In his purport to the Bhagavata Purana (10.66), A. C. Bhaktivedanta Swami relays the Gaudiya Vaishnav Acharya Vishvanatha Chakravarti's reading of Paundraka's ultimatum. Having foolishly taken up imitations of Krishna's conch, disc, lotus, and club, Paundraka is really asking Krishna to strip these false symbols from him and grant him release by killing him.

== Sources ==
- Geen, Jonathan (2009). "Kṛṣṇa and His Rivals in the Hindu and Jaina Traditions". Bulletin of the School of Oriental and African Studies, University of London. 72 (1). Cambridge University Press: 63–99. JSTOR 40378845.
