= Sri Krishna Rukmini Satyabhama =

1971 Kannada mythological film by K. S. L. Swamy

- Directed by: K. S. L. Swamy
- Written by: K. S. L. Swamy
- Screenplay by: K. S. L. Swamy
- Starring: Rajkumar; B. Saroja Devi; Bharathi; Aarathi
- Cinematography: Chittibabu
- Edited by: Bal G. Yadav; N. M. Victor
- Music by: R. Sudarsanam
- Production company: Raghunanadan Movies
- Release date: 31 December 1971
- Running time: 153 minutes
- Country: India
- Language: Kannada

Sri Krishna Rukmini Satyabhama is a 1971 Kannada-language Hindu mythological film written and directed by K. S. L. Swamy under his home banner Raghunandan movies. The film stars Rajkumar, B. Saroja Devi, Aarathi and Bharathi. The music was composed by R. Sudarsanam.

== Cast ==
- Rajkumar as Lord Krishna
- B. Saroja Devi as Rukmini
- Bharathi as Satyabhama
- Aarathi as Jambavati
- Srinath as Narada
- Dwarakish as Makarañda
- Lokanath as Ugrasena
- Thoogudeepa Srinivas as Rukmi
- Dinesh as Shishupala
- K. S. Ashwath as Satrajit
- Sampath as Bhishmaka
- B. Jaya as Kamala
- Arun Kumar

== Soundtrack ==
The music of the film was composed by R. Sudarsanam and lyrics for the soundtrack written by Chi. Udaya Shankar and Chi. Sadashivaiah.

=== Track list ===
#	Title	Singer(s)
1	"Nodalu Kangalu"	P. B. Sreenivas, S. Janaki
2	"Parama Sundari Bhama"	P. B. Sreenivas
3	"Dorakitu Nanagindu"	Soolamangalam Rajalakshmi
4	"Heluve Kaniya"	A. P. Komala, Anjali
5	"Marethanalla Indu"	S. Janaki
6	"Bhama Satyabhama"	P. B. Sreenivas
7	"Meera Ballane"	S. Janaki
8	"Aaha Entha Samaya"	P. B. Sreenivas

== See also ==
- Kannada films of 1971
