= Shambara =

Hindu mythological character

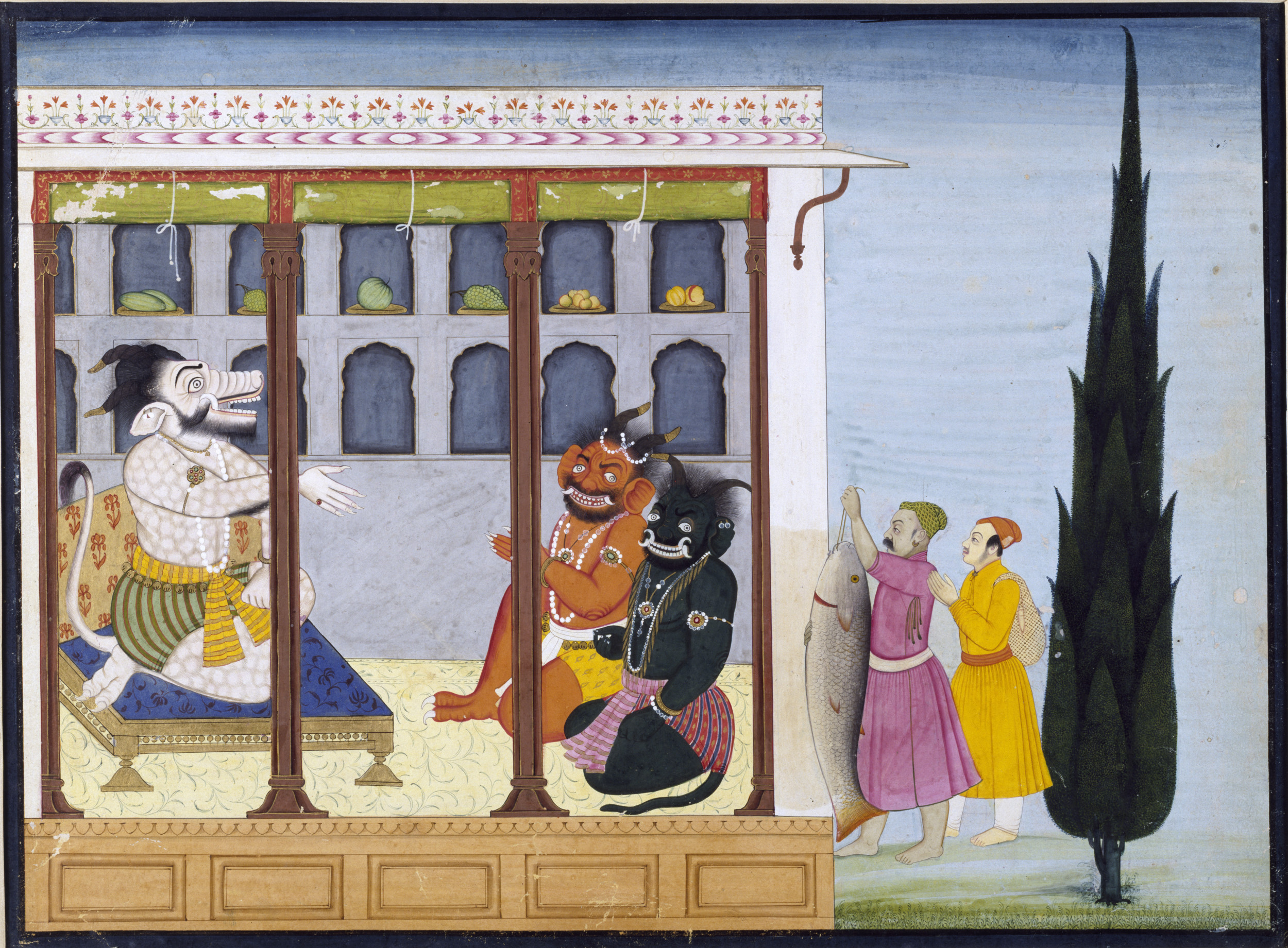
- An illustration of Shambara (left) talking with his court members
- Affiliation: Asura
- Texts: Puranas

Genealogy
- Children: Mayasura, Shringaketu, Kumbhaketu

Shambara (Sanskrit: शम्बर, romanized: Śambara) is an asura featured in Hindu mythology. He abducted the infant Pradyumna, the son of Krishna and Rukmini, and attempted to drown him. Pradyumna was raised by Mayavati (Rati), Shambara cook, and the consort of the deity's true form of Kamadeva. After eventually growing up, Pradyumna killed Shambara and returned to his family in Dvaraka, along with his consort.

== Legend ==
Kamadeva was burnt to ashes formerly by Shiva's anger. Kamadeva was later born as Pradyumna, the son of Krishna and Rukmini. The asura Shambara learned of the prophecy that Pradyumna was born to kill him. Shambara came to the palace of Dvaraka in the disguise of a woman, took away Pradyumna, who was hardly ten days old at that time, and threw him into the ocean. Pradyumna was swallowed by a large fish. Shambara later bought the same fish from a fisherman. Mayavati, the incarnation of Rati, who worked in Shambara's kitchen as a cook, found Pradyumna inside the fish. She recognised him as the reincarnation of her consort Kamadeva, and raised him until he was an adolescent.

== Battle with Shambara ==
After Pradyumna grew up, Mayavati revealed to him his true identity as well as her own, as well as his purpose on earth, which was to slay Shambara. Pradyumna fought with Shambara, who employed the magic of the asuras. Rati also knew daitya magic, and taught Pradyumna how to neutralise the asura's magic with her knowledge of mahāmāyā vidyā. Pradyumna severed Shambara's head with one blow of his sword. Pradyumna then went to Dvaraka, and was reunited with his family.

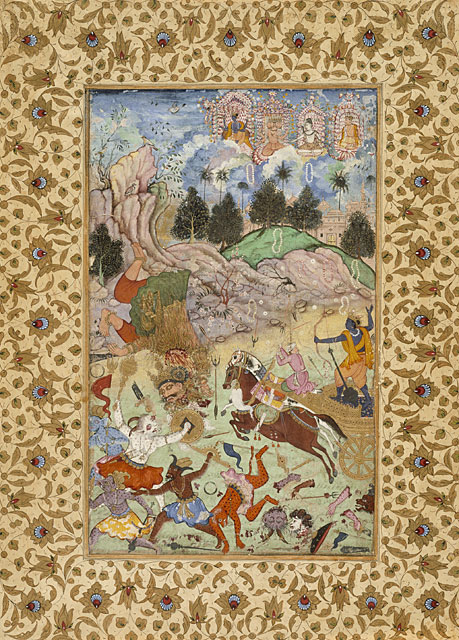

Pradyumna kills Shambara
