= Rati =

Hindu goddess of sexual pleasure, carnal desire and pleasure

- Goddess of Sexual Pleasure, Lust and Passion
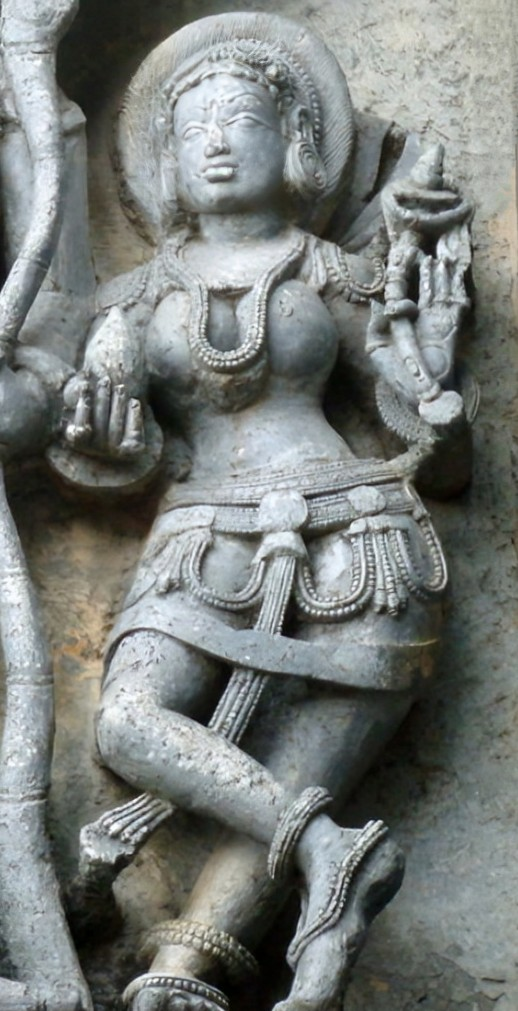
- Sculpture of Rati on a temple wall of Chennakesava Temple, Belur
- Devanagari: रति
- Sanskrit transliteration: Rati
- Affiliation: Devi
- Abode: Kamaloka
- Weapon: Sword
- Mount: Parrot

Genealogy
- Parents: Daksha
- Consort: Kamadeva
- Children: Harsha & Yasha (sons)

Equivalents
- Greek: Aphrodite
- Roman: Venus

Rati (Sanskrit: रति, Rati) is the Hindu goddess of love, physical desire, passion, and sexual pleasure. Usually described as the daughter of Prajapati Daksha, Rati is the female counterpart, the chief consort and the assistant of Kama (Kamadeva), the god of love. A constant companion of Kama, she is often depicted with him in legend and temple sculpture. She also enjoys worship along with Kama.

The Hindu scriptures stress Rati's beauty and sensuality. They depict her as a maiden who has the power to enchant the God of Love. When the deity Shiva burns her husband to ashes, it is Rati, whose beseeching or penance, leads to the promise of Kama's resurrection. Often, this resurrection occurs when Kama is reborn as Pradyumna, the son of Krishna and Rukmini. Rati – under the name of Mayavati – plays a critical role in the upbringing of Pradyumna, who is separated from his parents at birth. She acts as his nanny, as well as his lover, and tells him the way to return to his parents by slaying the demon-king, who is destined to die at his hands. Later, Kama-Pradyumna accepts Rati-Mayavati as his wife.

== Etymology ==
The name of the goddess Rati comes from the Sanskrit root ram, meaning "enjoy" or "delight in." Although the verb root generally refers to any sort of enjoyment, it usually carries connotations of physical and sensual enjoyment. Etymologically, the word rati refers to anything that can be enjoyed; but, it is almost always used to refer to sexual love.

== Legend ==
=== Birth and marriage ===
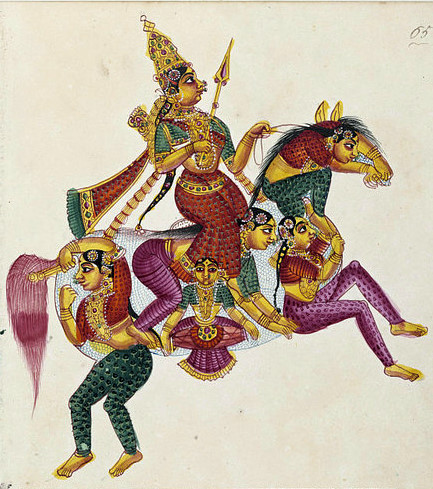
Rati on a composite horse

The Kalika Purana narrates the following tale about Rati's birth. After the creation of the 10 Prajapatis, Brahma – the creator-god – creates Kama (Kamadeva), the god of love, from his mind. Kama is ordered to spread love in the world by shooting his flower-arrows. Prajapati Daksha is requested to present a wife to Kama. Kama first uses his arrows against Brahma and the Prajapatis, who are all incestuously attracted to Brahma's daughter Sandhya ("Twilight-dawn/dusk"). The god Shiva, gets enraged by the heinous act of Brahma and shows his condemnation. Embarrassed, Brahma and the Prajapatis tremble and perspire. From the sweat of Daksha rises a beautiful woman named Rati, who Daksha presents to Kama as his wife. At the same time, the agitated Brahma curses Kama to be burnt to ashes by Shiva in the future. However, on Kama's pleading, Brahma assures him that he would be reborn.

The Brahma Vaivarta Purana narrates that Sandhya committed suicide, after Brahma lusted for her. The god Vishnu resurrects her, names her Rati, and marries her to Kama. The Shiva Purana mentions that after her suicide, Sandhya is reborn from the sweat of Daksha as Rati. In some texts, Shiva is described as the father of Rati.

The Harivamsa, an appendix to the epic Mahabharata, mentions that Kama and Rati have two children, Harsha ("Joy") and Yashas ("Grace"). However, the Vishnu Purana mentions that Rati, as Nandi, only has one son – Harsha. The epics Mahabharata as well as the Ramayana, also attest to Rati being the consort of Kama.

=== Mayavati ===
The demon Tarakasura had created havoc in the universe, and only the son of god Shiva could slay him, but Shiva had turned to ascetic ways after the death of his first wife, Sati. Kama was thus instructed by the gods to make Shiva fall in love again. Kama went to Mount Kailash with Rati and Madhu or Vasanta ("Spring"), and shot his love-arrows at Shiva (in another version of the legend, Kama entered Shiva's mind) and invoked desire. Wounded by Kama's arrows, Shiva becomes attracted to Parvati, the reincarnation of Sati, but agitated, burns Kama by a glance of his third eye.

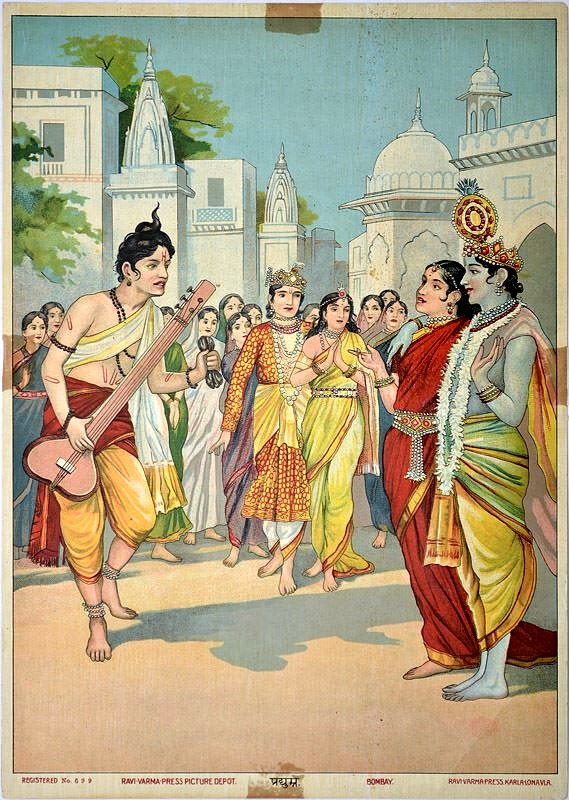
Kama as Pradyumna with Rati as Mayavati, return to Dvaraka

The Bhagavata Purana narrates further that the grief-stricken Rati goes mad by Kama's death and in the Matsya Purana and the Padma Purana versions, she smears herself with her husband's ashes. Further in Bhagavata Purana, Rati undergoes severe penance and pleads with Parvati to intercede with Shiva to restore her husband. Parvati reassures her that Kama would be reborn as Pradyumna, the son of Krishna, the avatar of the god Vishnu on earth, and Rati should wait for him in the demon (asura) Sambara's house. In other versions of the narrative like the Matsya Purana, the Padma Purana, the Shiva Purana, the Linga Purana and the Kathasaritsagara, it is Shiva who blesses Rati with the boon of Kama's resurrection.

In other variants, she curses the gods who sent Kama for this doomed mission and the gods, as a group or Brahma, seeks relief for the grieving Rati from Shiva or the Supreme Goddess, Parvati being one of her many manifestations. In some legends, like the one in the Brahmanda Purana, the Goddess revives Kama immediately, hearing the pleading of the wailing Rati and the gods. The renowned Sanskrit poet Kalidasa dedicates canto IV discussing the plight of Rati in his Kumarasambhava, which focuses on the story of the wedding of Shiva and Parvati and the birth of their son Kartikeya, who kills Tarakasura. Canto IV narrates that Rati witnesses the death of her husband and laments his death, and then tries to immolate herself on a funeral pyre. A heavenly voice stops her on time, stating that after the marriage of Shiva, he will revive her husband.

The Kedara Khanda chapter of the Skanda Purana presents a very different version. In this version, after the burning of Kama, Parvati is worried that she could not achieve Shiva in absence of Kama. Parvati is consoled by Rati, who asserts that she will revive Kama and starts severe austerities to achieve her goal. Once, the divine sage Narada asks her "whose she was". Agitated, Rati insults Narada. The spiteful Narada provokes the demon Sambara to kidnap Rati. Sambara takes her to his house, but is unable to touch her as the goddess decreed that he would be reduced to ashes if he touches her. There, Rati becomes the "kitchen in-charge" and is known as Mayavati ("mistress of illusion – Maya").

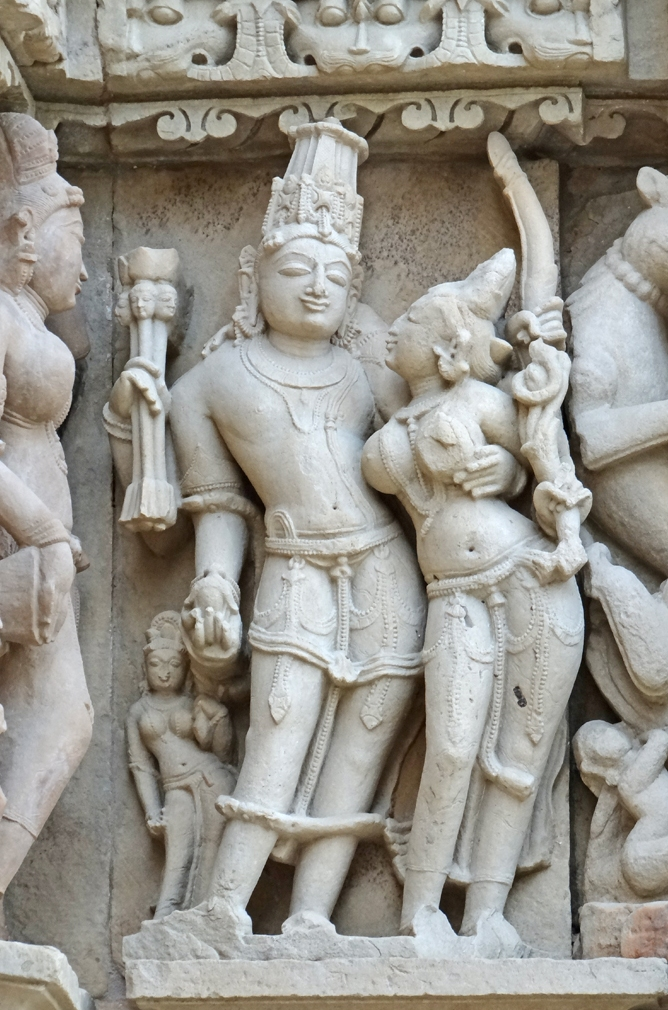
Sculpture of Kama and Rati at Khajuraho

The Bhagavata Purana and the Kathasaritsagara continue, that on advice of Shiva, Rati assumes the form of Sambara's kitchen-maid Mayavati and awaits her husband's arrival in Sambara's house. Sambara is foretold that the reborn Kama would be his destroyer. Sambara finds out that Kama was born as Pradyumna, the son of Krishna and his chief wife, Rukmini. He steals the child and throws him in the ocean, where the child is swallowed by a fish. This fish is caught by fishermen and sent to Sambara's kitchen. When the fish is cut, the child is found by Mayavati, who decides to nurture him. The divine sage Narada reveals to Mayavati that she was Rati and the child was Kama, and that she was to rear him. As the child grew up, the motherly love of Mayavati changes to the passionate love of a wife. The reborn Kama resents her advances, as he considers her his mother. Mayavati tells him the secret of their previous births as narrated by Narada and that he was not her son, but that of Krishna and Rukmini. Mayavati trains Pradyumna in magic and war and advises him to kill Sambara. Pradyumna defeats Sambara and slays him. He returns to Dvaraka, Krishna's capital with Mayavati as his wife, where they are welcomed.

The Vishnu Purana and the Harivamsa also have a similar account, though the reincarnation of Rati is called Mayadevi and described as Sambara's wife, rather than his maid. Both these scriptures safeguard her chastity saying that Rati donned an illusionary form to enchant Sambara. The Brahma Vaivarta Purana explicitly states that Rati does not sleep with Sambara, but gave him the illusionary form of Mayavati. Rati-Mayavati takes a critical role in all narratives of this story where she seduces – by her Maya – both Sambara and Kama-Pradyumna, her "son" who she convinces to be her lover. All texts at the end stress on her purity, untouched by another man.

The Harivamsa describes Aniruddha, the son of Pradyumna, as "the son of Rati".

== In Jainism ==
In Jain narrative literature, Rati appears in the Pradyumna cycle in a form distinct from the Puranic goddess-wife of Kama. In Somakirti's Pradyumna-kumāra-carita and later Digambara summaries of the story, Pradyumna becomes identified with Madana or Kamadeva after receiving a flower-bow and five flower-arrows. He later encounters Rati performing austerities in the Vipula forest. Vasanta explains that she is the daughter of the Vidyadhara lord Prabhanjana and that a yogi had foretold that Krishna's son Pradyumna would become her husband. Vasanta arranges their marriage, and the asura Sankata gives the couple a Kamadhenu and a divine chariot.

The Jain story later describes Pradyumna's ceremonial marriage to Rati at Dvaraka, along with his marriages to Udadhi-kumari and other princesses. In the closing ascetic turn of the narrative, when Pradyumna renounces worldly life at Girnar, Rati and his other wives agree to undertake austerity under Aryika Rajimati.

== Associations, worship, and iconography ==
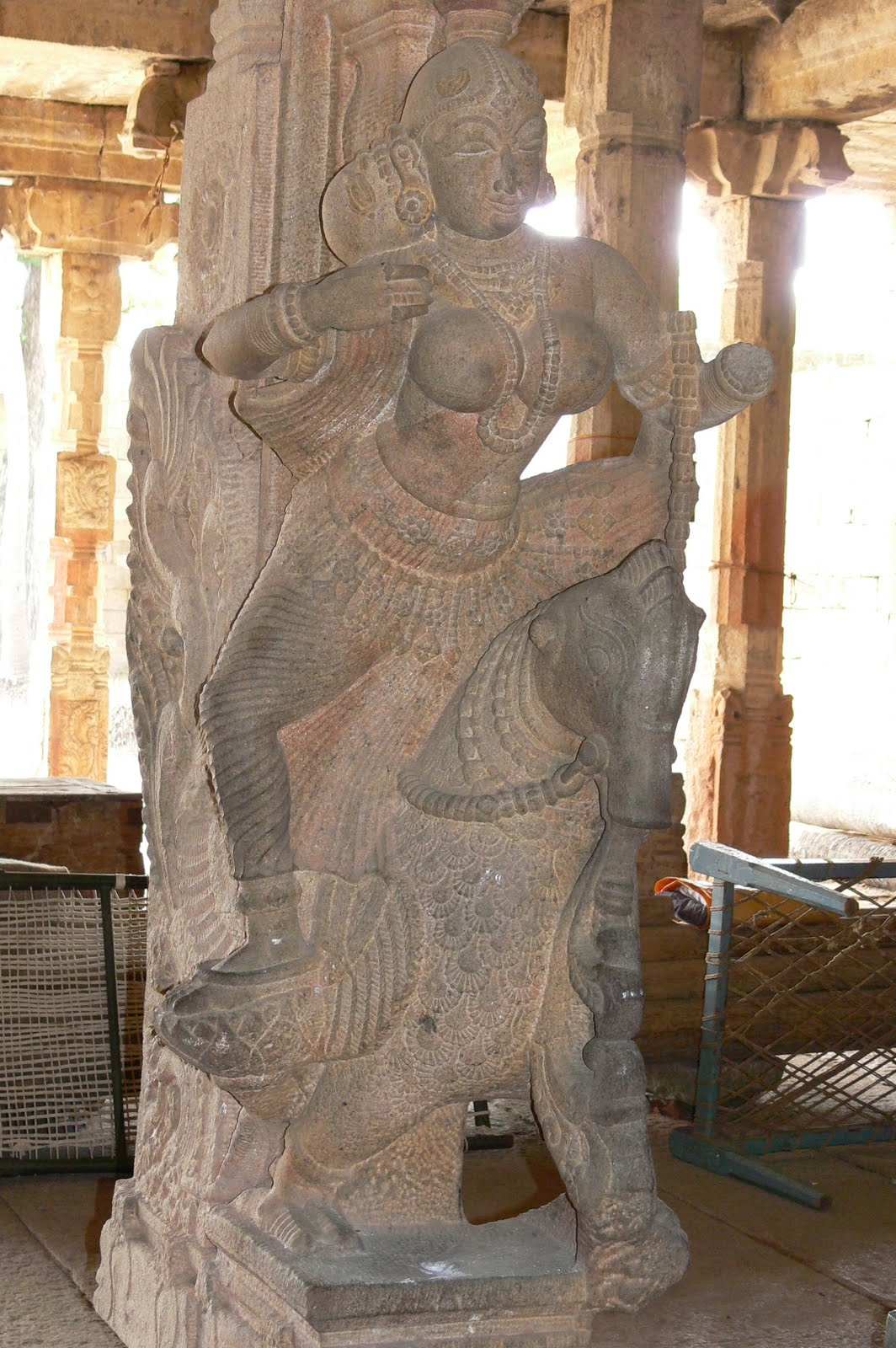
A stone Rati sculpture on a temple pillar, opposite the pillar with Kama. Seated on a parrot, Rati is holding a sugarcane bow. Shikakirisvara Temple, Kudumiyanmalai

The name Rati in Sanskrit means "the pleasure of love, sexual passion or union, amorous enjoyment", all of which Rati personifies. Rati also indicates the female-seed. The word Rati also gives rise to other love-related Sanskrit words like Kama-rati ("a man stupefied by desire"), rati-karman ("sexual intercourse"), rati-laksha ("sexual intercourse"), rati-bhoga ("sexual enjoyment"), rati-shakti ("virile power"), rati-jna ("skilled in the art of love"), and rati-yuddha ("a sex-battle"). The word Rati also appears in title of the Sanskrit erotic work Rati-Rahasya ("secrets of Rati") – which is said to contain the sexual secrets of the goddess – as well as in the Sanskrit names of many sex techniques and positions like Rati-pasha ("the noose of Rati"), a sex position in which the woman locks her legs behind her lover's back.

Rati stands for sexual pleasure, carnal desire and sexuality. Rati represents only the pleasure aspect of sexual activity and does not relate to child-birth or motherhood. Professor Catherine Benton of the Lake Forest College (Department of Religion) relates her birth from the "desire-ridden" sweat to bodily fluids produced during sexual intercourse, which are considered impure in Hinduism. Her association with Kama – the auspicious god of love – grants her the status of an auspicious goddess. Rati and Kama are often pictured on temple walls as "welcome sculptures", symbols of good fortune and prosperity. Not only is Rati Kama's consort, but she is also his assistant and constant companion, who arouses sexual feelings. Kama is usually depicted with Rati along his side. Rati is also included as a minor character in any drama involving Kama. Rati also enjoys worship with Kama in some festival rites dedicated to him.

The Shiva Purana mentions that Kama himself was pierced by his love-arrows when he saw his "auspicious wife", Rati. Rati, as well as her husband Kama, ride a parrot as their vahana (vehicle). Rati is often depicted with a sword.

In Tantra, the Mahavidya goddess Chhinnamasta is depicted severing her own head and standing on the copulating couple of Kama and Rati, with the latter on top, (viparita-rati sex position). The woman-on-top position suggests female dominance over male. Chhinnamasta standing on a copulating couple of Kama and Rati is interpreted by some as a symbol of self-control of sexual desire, while others interpret it as the goddess, being an embodiment of sexual energy. Images of Chhinnamasta depicted sitting on Kamadeva-Rati in a non-suppressive fashion are associated with the latter interpretation. The love-deity couple also symbolize maithuna, ritual sexual union.

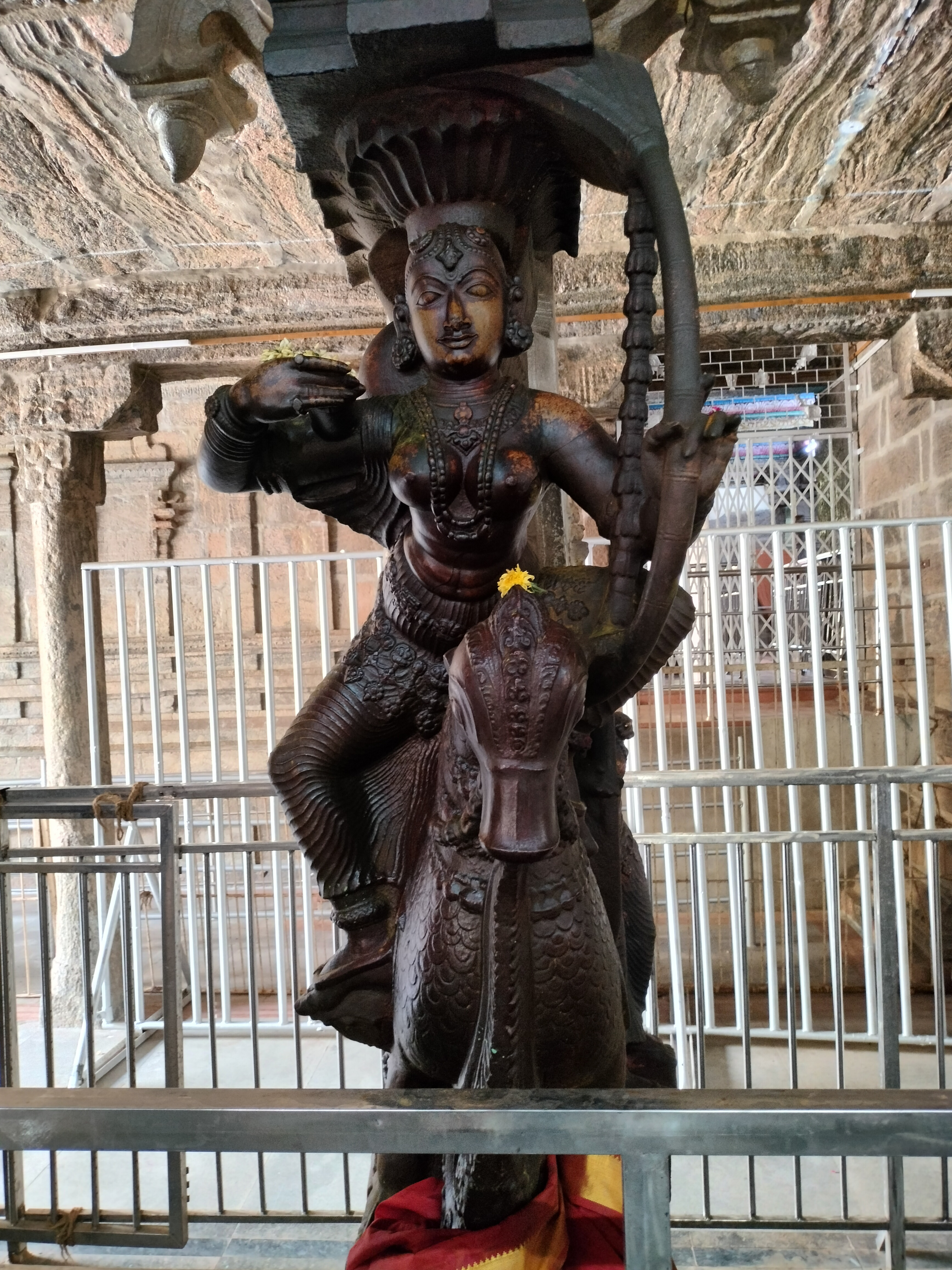
Statue of Rati, Koodal Alagar Temple, Madurai

Worship

- Kameshwara Temple, in Aragalur. The Sthala purana indicates that Kamadeva woke up Shiva at this place.
- Kameshvara Temple, in Kamyavan, one of the twelve forests of Vrindavana.
- Soundaraja Perumal Temple at Thadikombu, near Dindigul, Tamil Nadu. Separate shrine for Kamdev and Rati.
- Harsat-Mata Temple at Abhaneri has representation of Kamadeva.

== Outside Indian subcontinent ==
=== Indonesia ===
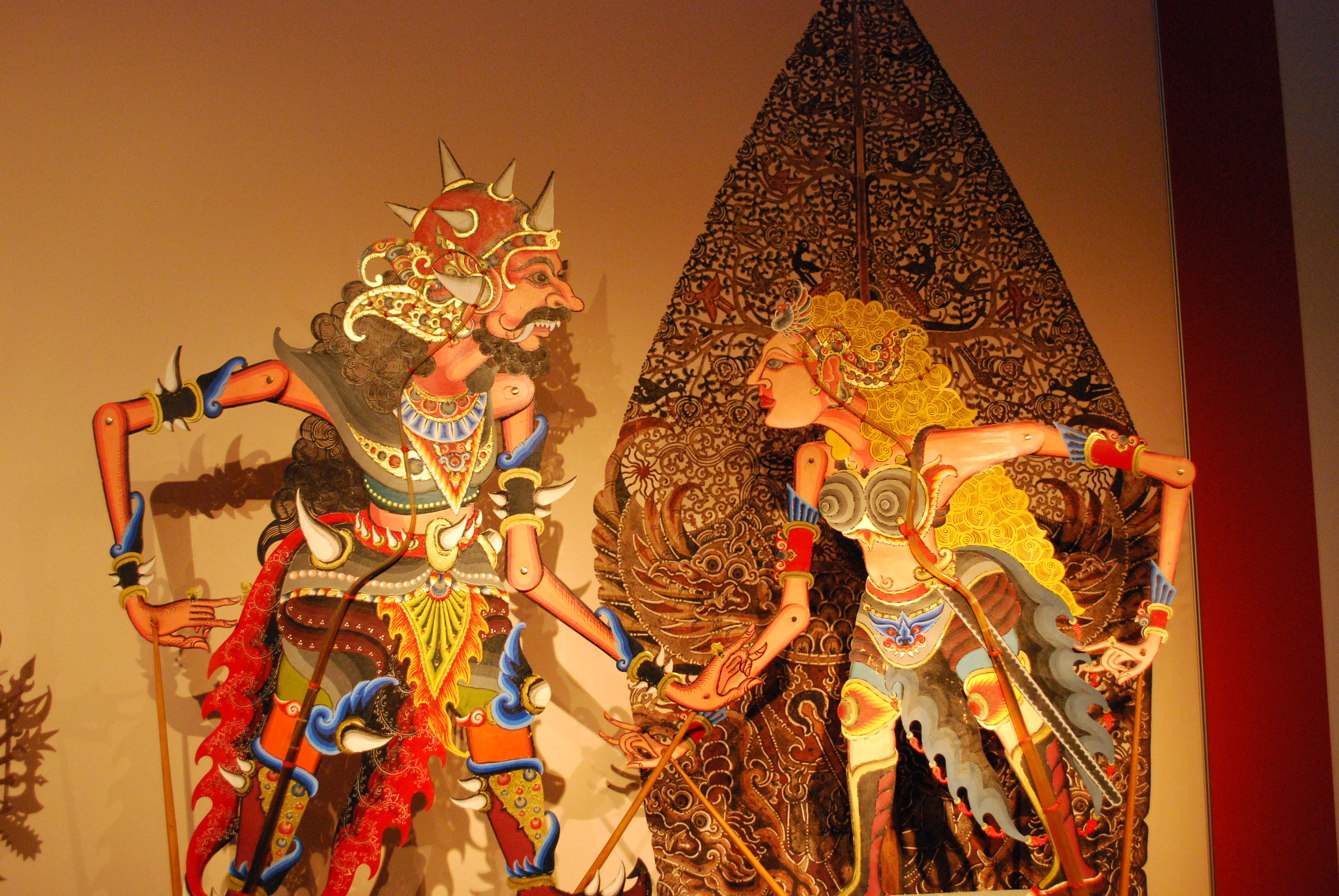
Kamaratih and Bathara Kamajaya wayang (puppetry) in Indonesian culture

In the Indonesian version, Rati (Indonesian: Kamaratih ) is the daughter of Bathara Soma, the son of Sanghyang Pancaresi, the descendant of Sanghyang Wening, the younger brother of Sanghyang Wenang. Kamaratih is married to Bathara Kamajaya, the ninth son of Sanghyang Ismaya and Dewi Senggani. He resides in Kahyangan Cakrakembang.

Kamaratih has a very beautiful face, has charm and character, is very loyal, loving, generous, kind, patient, and devoted to her husband. She, together with her husband, Bathara Kamajaya, is a symbol of husband-wife harmony in the universe, because of their harmony and love for one another.

Kamaratih was once assigned by Sanghyang Manikmaya to send Wahyu Hidayat to Dewi Utari, the youngest son of Prabu Matswapati, the king of Wirata and his consort, Dewi Ni Yutisnawati/Setyawati. Wahyu Hidayat was revealed as the pair of Wahyu Cakraningrat who was passed down by Bathara Kamajaya to Raden Abhimanyu/Angkawijaya, son of Arjuna and Dewi Sumbadra.
