= Rukmi =

Character from the Hindu epic Mahabharata

- Mahabharata character
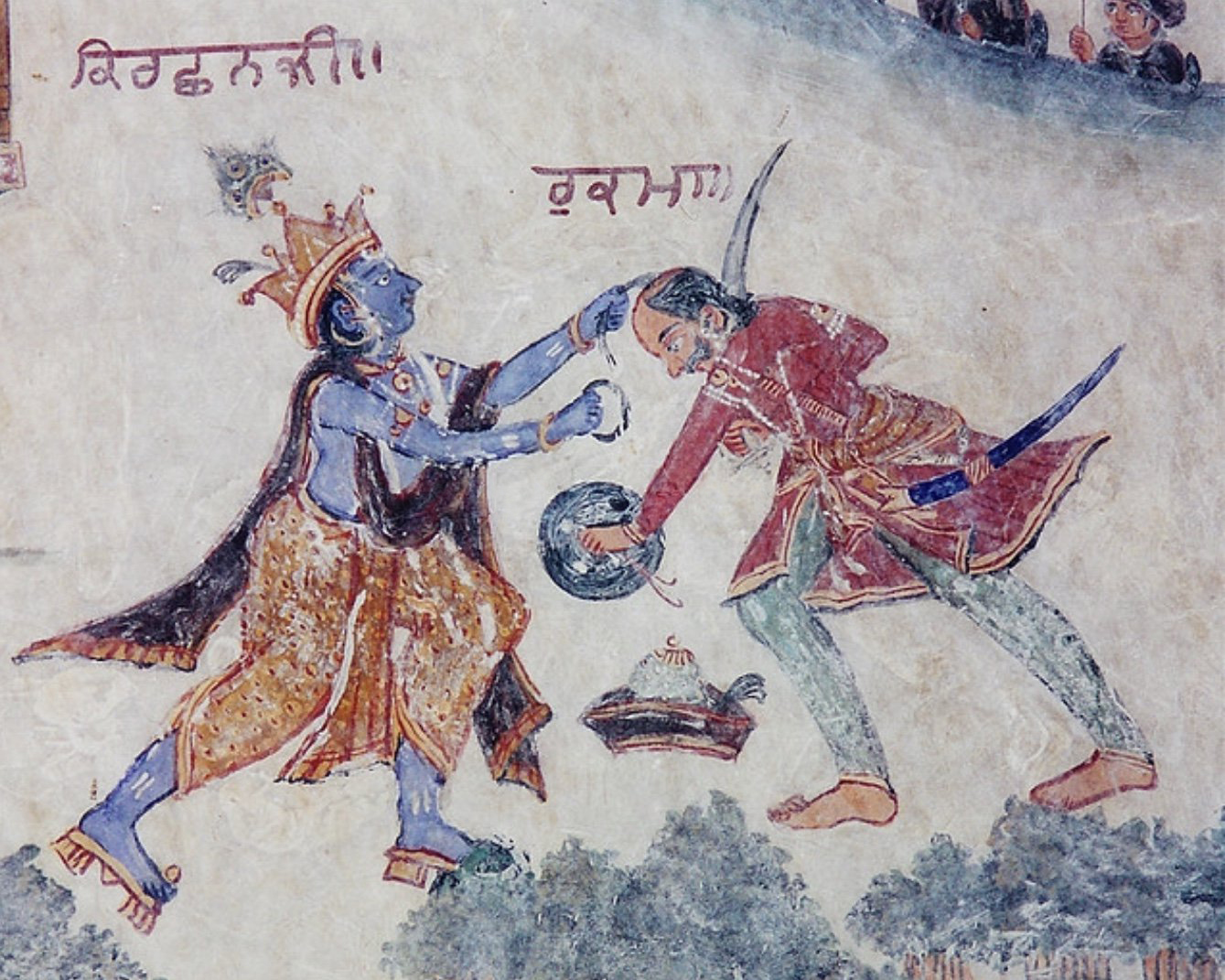
- Depiction of a duel between Krishna and Rukmi (right)

Information
- Title: King of Bhojakata
- Weapon: Vijaya (bow)
- Family: Bhishmaka (father); Rukmini (sister); Rochana (grand-daughter)
- Children: Rukmavati (daughter)
- Home: Vidarbha Kingdom
- Dynasty: Yaduvamsha
- Clan: Bhoja

Rukmi (Sanskrit: रुक्मी) is a prince from the Vidarbha kingdom attested in Hindu texts. He was the eldest son of King Bhishmaka and the brother of Rukmini, who married Krishna. Known for his martial skills and conflicts with prominent figures like Krishna and Balarama, Rukmi's life is detailed across various sections of the Mahabharata and the Bhagavata Purana.

== Birth and Family ==
Rukmi was the son of King Bhishmaka, who was also known by the name Hiranyaroma. Bhishmaka had two children: Rukmi and his younger sister Rukmini (Mahabharata, Sabha Parva). According to the Adi Parva, he was born from a portion of the Asura named Krodhavasha. According to Bhagavata Purana, Rukmi had several younger brothers as well.

== Enmity with Krishna ==
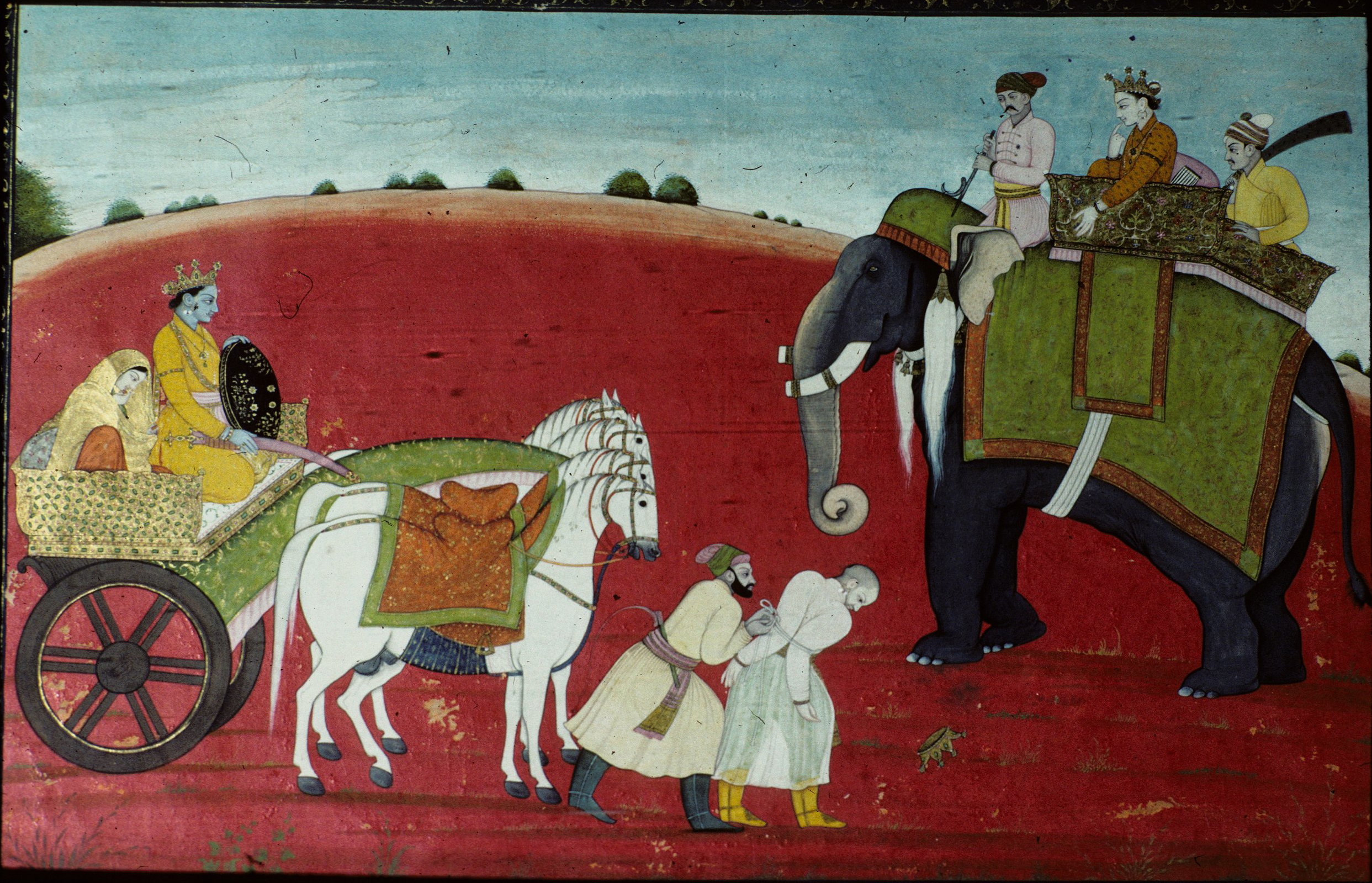
Miniature Painting, Krishna releases the defeated Rukmi, Guler style, 1770, Chamba Museum, Himachal Pradesh

Rukmi formed an alliance with Jarasandha, the ruler of Magadha, who held significant power and influence, commanding loyalty from various kings and regions. Rukmi’s association with him likely shaped his enmity with Krishna, the Yadava leader from Dwaraka. During Jarasandha’s military campaigns, Rukmi was positioned by Jarasandha at the western gate of Mathura and on the eastern side during the siege of Gomanta. Within this context, Rukmi planned to marry his younger sister, Rukmini, to Shishupala, the prince of Chedi. Shishupala was a known ally of Jarasandha and a rival of Krishna, despite being his cousin. The proposed marriage aimed to strengthen ties between Vidarbha, Magadha, and Chedi. Though Rukmini herself preferred Krishna as her suitor and her parents had initially considered, Rukmi’s decision was finalised. According to Bhagavata Purana, Rukmini, however, opposed this arrangement. She sent a message to Krishna, requesting him to abduct her before the wedding to Shishupala could occur. Krishna acted on her request, taking her from Vidarbha and defeating Rukmi in the ensuing confrontation. At Rukmini’s plea, Krishna spared Rukmi’s life but humiliated him by shaving his hair and mustache and binding him to his chariot.

Unable to accept this disgrace, Rukmi vowed to kill Krishna before returning to Kundina. Subsequently released by Balarama, Rukmi chose not to return to Vidarbha capital Kundina and instead established and resided in Bhojakata. Rukmi traveled to Kailasa and performed penance before Shiva for three years. Pleased with his devotion, Shiva granted him a bow designed to destroy enemies, cautioning that it would break only if used against Vishnu. With this divine weapon, Rukmi returned to Bhojakata and resumed his rule. Additionally, Rukmi trained under Druma, a renowned Kimpurusha (Kinnara), who taught him archery and presented him with another bow called Vijaya. This bow was considered equal in power to the Gandiva, the famed weapon of Arjuna (Mahabharata). Despite this prowess, Rukmi faced defeat again at Krishna's hands.

== As a ruler ==
Rukmi arranged a svayamvara contest of his daughter Rukmavati. Pradyumna, the son of Krishna, emerged victorious in the contest against assembled kings, securing Rukmavati and taking her away. Despite his enduring enmity toward Krishna, Rukmi permitted this union, motivated by a desire to please his sister, Rukmini. He continued to harbor resentment against Krishna.

Several episodes in the Mahabharata highlight Rukmi's political interactions with key figures. During Sahadeva's regional conquests, Rukmi accepted his suzerainty (Mahabharata, Sabha Parva). Rukmi paid tribute to Karna during the latter's own conquests (Mahabharata, Vana Parva). The Pandavas invited Rukmi to join them in the impending Bharata battle (Mahabharata, Udyoga Parva).

Following his defeat by Krishna, Rukmi sought peace with him. The Pandavas, aware of this shift, invited Rukmi to their palace. He arrogantly offered assistance to Arjuna, promising aid if Arjuna ever feared battle. Arjuna laughed and declined the help. Rukmi then approached Duryodhana with a similar offer, but Duryodhana also rejected him (Mahabharata, Udyoga Parva).

== Later life and death ==
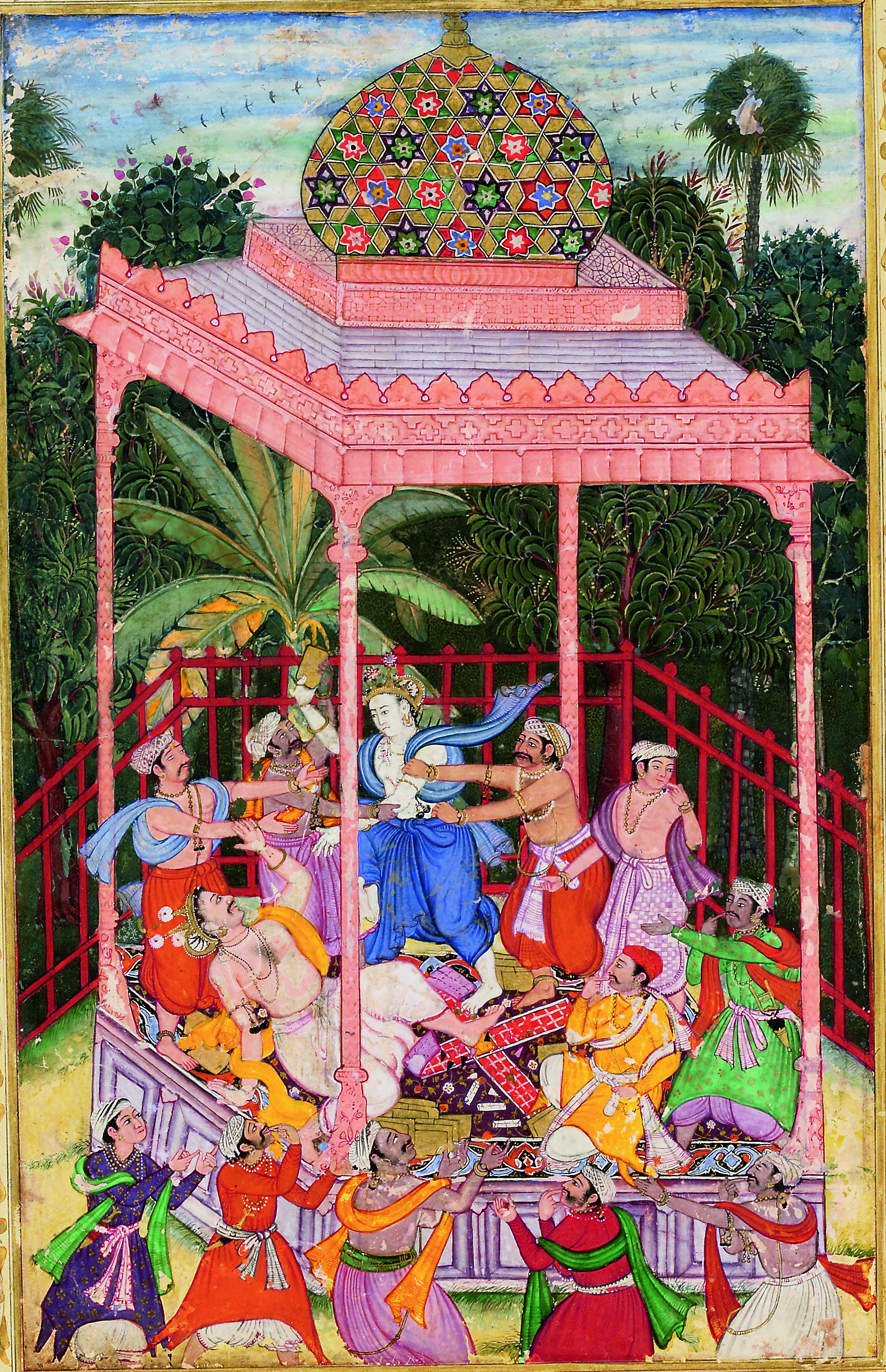
Balarama kills Rukmi, from a 16th century folio of Persian translation of Harivamsha

According to Bhagavata Purana, Skandha 10, Rukmi arranged for his granddaughter, Rochana, to marry Aniruddha, son of Rukmavati and Pradyumna. This decision, though inconsistent with norms against aligning with an enemy, was driven by familial affection, particularly toward Rukmini. The wedding drew Krishna, Balarama, Rukmini, Pradyumna, and other Yadavas to Bhojakata.

Following the ceremony, tensions escalated when certain kings, including the ruler of Kalinga, goaded Rukmi into challenging Balarama to a dice game, exploiting Balarama’s perceived weakness in the activity despite his enthusiasm for it. The game proceeded with escalating wagers—initially hundreds, then thousands, and eventually millions of gold coins. Balarama lost early rounds to Rukmi, prompting mockery from the Kalinga king, which irritated Balarama. In a subsequent wager of one hundred thousand coins, Balarama won, but Rukmi falsely claimed victory. This pattern repeated with a bet of one hundred million coins; Balarama won fairly, yet Rukmi again denied it, supported by allied kings. A celestial voice intervened, affirming Balarama’s win and denouncing Rukmi’s deceit, but Rukmi dismissed it, insulting Balarama and the Yadavas as unfit for such games, reserved for royalty. Provoked, Balarama killed Rukmi with his club, also attacking the Kalinga king, breaking his teeth, and scattering the other kings in a violent reprisal.

Similar account of Rukmi's death at Balarama's hands is also found in the Harivamsha, the appendix of the Mahabharata.
