= Vijaya (bow) =

Celestial bow in Hinduism

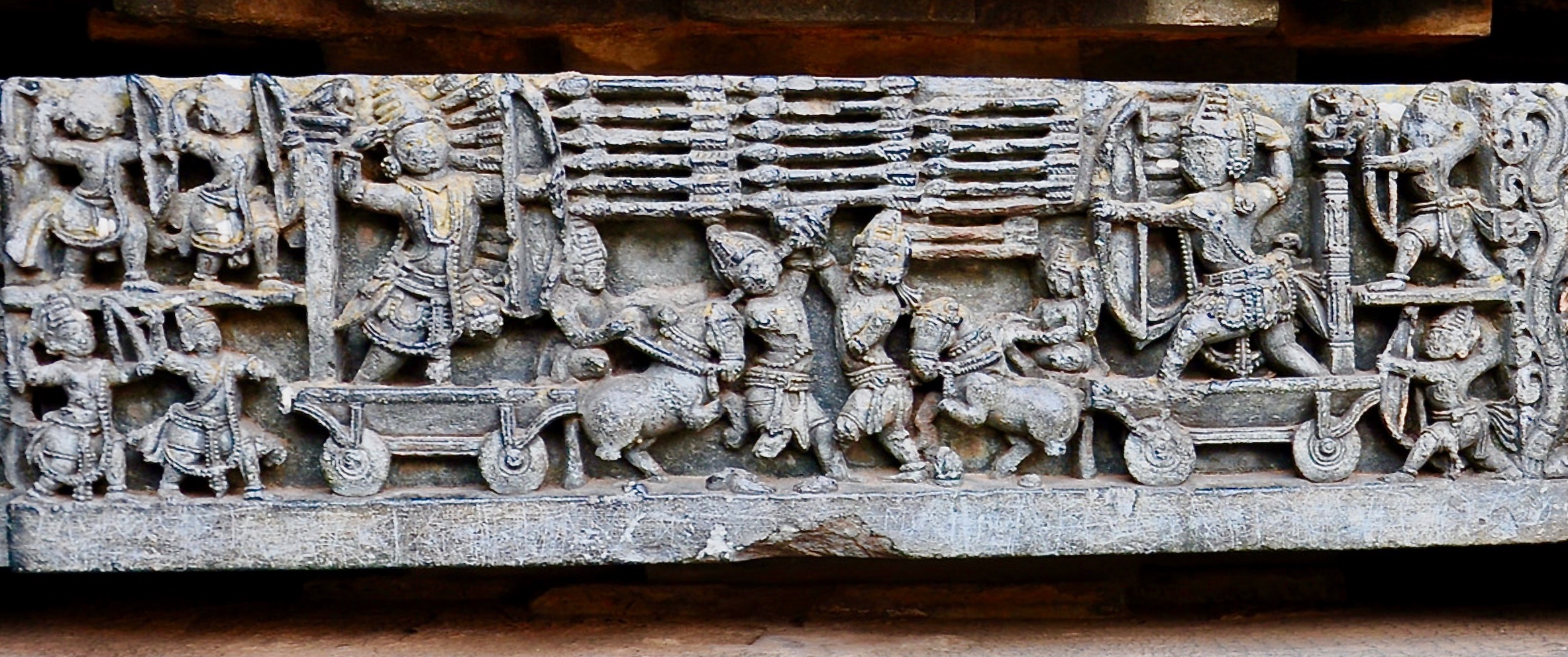
- Relief of Karna wielding the Vijaya against Arjuna
- Type: Bow

Service history
- Used by: Shiva; Indra; Karna; Parashurama

Production history
- Designer: Vishvakarma

Vijaya (Sanskrit: विजय, lit. 'Victory'), also called Vijaya Dhanusha (lit. 'Vijaya bow'), is a divine bow in Hindu tradition. The bow was crafted by Vishvakarma, the architect of the gods, for Shiva as per Hindu mythology, for destroying the three asura cities of Tripura during Tripura war.

== Shiva's Vijaya bow ==
According to Purans Vishwakarma made the Vijaya bow and gave it to Lord Shiva for destroying the three cities of asuras known as Tripura . After the cities were slayed the bow was with Lord Shiva. Later he passed it onto Indra and then Parashuram and then to Karna. It say it grants its user invincibility as long they hold it.

Both Karna and Rukmi are associated with a divine bow named Vijaya in the Mahabharata, though they represent distinct instances of divine weaponry. Karna's Vijaya bow was the supreme, divine bow crafted by Vishvakarma for Lord Shiva (later Indra/Parashurama), while Rukmi's Vijaya bow was a celestial bow obtained from a Kimpurusha, often described as a similar but different divine item.

== Rukmi's Vijaya bow ==
Mahabharata describes Rukmi stating that he is the wielder of celestial Vijaya bow. The bow Vijaya was specially made by Vishwakarma for Indra, when he was waging a war on asuras. Later it was said to passed to a Kimpurusha named Druma, from whom Rukmi obtained it.

The high-souled Bhishmaka, who was otherwise called king Hiranyaroman, was the friend of Indra. And he was most illustrious among the descendants of Bhoja and was the ruler of the whole southern country. And Rukmi was a disciple of that lion among the Kimpurushas who was known by the name of Drona, having his abode on the mountains of Gandhamadana. And he had learnt from his preceptor the whole science of weapons with its four divisions. And that mighty-armed warrior had obtained also the bow named Vijaya of celestial workmanship, belonging to the great Indra, and which was equal to Gandiva in energy and to also Sarnga (held by Krishna). There were three celestial bows owned by the denizens of heaven, viz., Gandiva owned by Varuna, the bow called Vijaya owned by Indra, and that other celestial bow of great energy said to have been owned by Vishnu. This last (Sarnga), capable of striking fear into the hearts of hostile warriors, was held by Krishna. The bow called Gandiva was obtained by Indra's son (Arjuna) from Agni on the occasion of the burning of Khandava, while the bow called Vijaya was obtained from Drona by Rukmi of great energy. Baffling the nooses of Mura and slaying by his might that Asura, and vanquishing Naraka, the son of the Earth, Hrishikesa, while recovering the begemmed ear-rings (of Aditi), with sixteen thousand girls and various kinds of jewels and gems, obtained that excellent bow called Sarnga. And Rukmi having obtained the bow called Vijaya whose twang resembled the roar of the clouds came to the Pandavas, as if inspiring the whole universe with dread.

— Udyoga Parva, Section CLVII

== Karna's Vijaya bow ==
In the Mahabharata, Karna also talks about the special bow:

My bow, called Vijaya, is the foremost of all weapons (of its kind). Desirous of doing what was agreeable (to Indra), it was made by Vishakarma (the celestial artificer) for Indra. With that bow, O king, Indra had vanquished the Daityas. At its twang the Daityas beheld the ten points to be empty. That bow, respected by all, Sakra gave to Bhrigu's son (Rama). That celestial and foremost of bows Bhrigu's son gave to me. With that bow I will contend in battle with the mighty-armed Arjuna, that foremost of victorious warriors, like Indra fighting with the assembled Daityas. That formidable bow, the gift of Rama, is superior to Gandiva. It was with that bow that the Earth was subjugated thrice seven times (by Bhrigu's son). With that bow given to me by Rama I will contend in battle with the son of Pandu. I will, O Duryodhana, gladden thee today with thy friends, by slaying in battle that hero, viz., Arjuna, that foremost of conquerors.

— Attributed to Vyasa, Mahabharata

According to the Mahabharata, He used this Bow only on the 17th day of Kurukshetra War during his last battle with Arjuna.

== See also ==
- Gandiva
- Sharanga
- Pinaka
