= Rukmavati =

Wife of Pradyumna in Hindu mythology

- The wedding ceremony of Rukmavati and Pradyumna
- Affiliation: Vaishnavism
- Abode: Dvaraka, Vidarbha
- Texts: Bhagavata Purana

Genealogy
- Parents: Rukmi (father)
- Spouse: Pradyumna
- Children: Aniruddha
- Dynasty: Yaduvamsha (by marriage)

Rukmavati (Sanskrit: रुक्मवती, romanized: Rukmāvatī) is the daughter of King Rukmi of Vidarbha and the second wife of Pradyumna in Hindu mythology. Pradyumna is the son of the deity Krishna and his chief wife Rukmini, the sister of Rukmi. Rukmavati has a son named Aniruddha, who is a member of the chatur-vyuha.

== Legend ==
The Bhagavata Purana describes the princess' marriage to Pradyumna. Pradyumna wins Rukmavati's hand in her svayamvara ceremony, by defeating other suitor princes. Though her father Rukmi harbours a grudge against Krishna, who had humiliated him, Rukmi consents, in accordance to the wishes of Rukmini. In the course of time, Rochana, another of Rukmi's granddaughters, is married to Rukmavati's son, Aniruddha. Vajra, son of Aniruddha and Rochana, is one of the few survivors of the Yadu civil war.
