= Aniruddha =

Grandson of the god Krishna in Hinduism

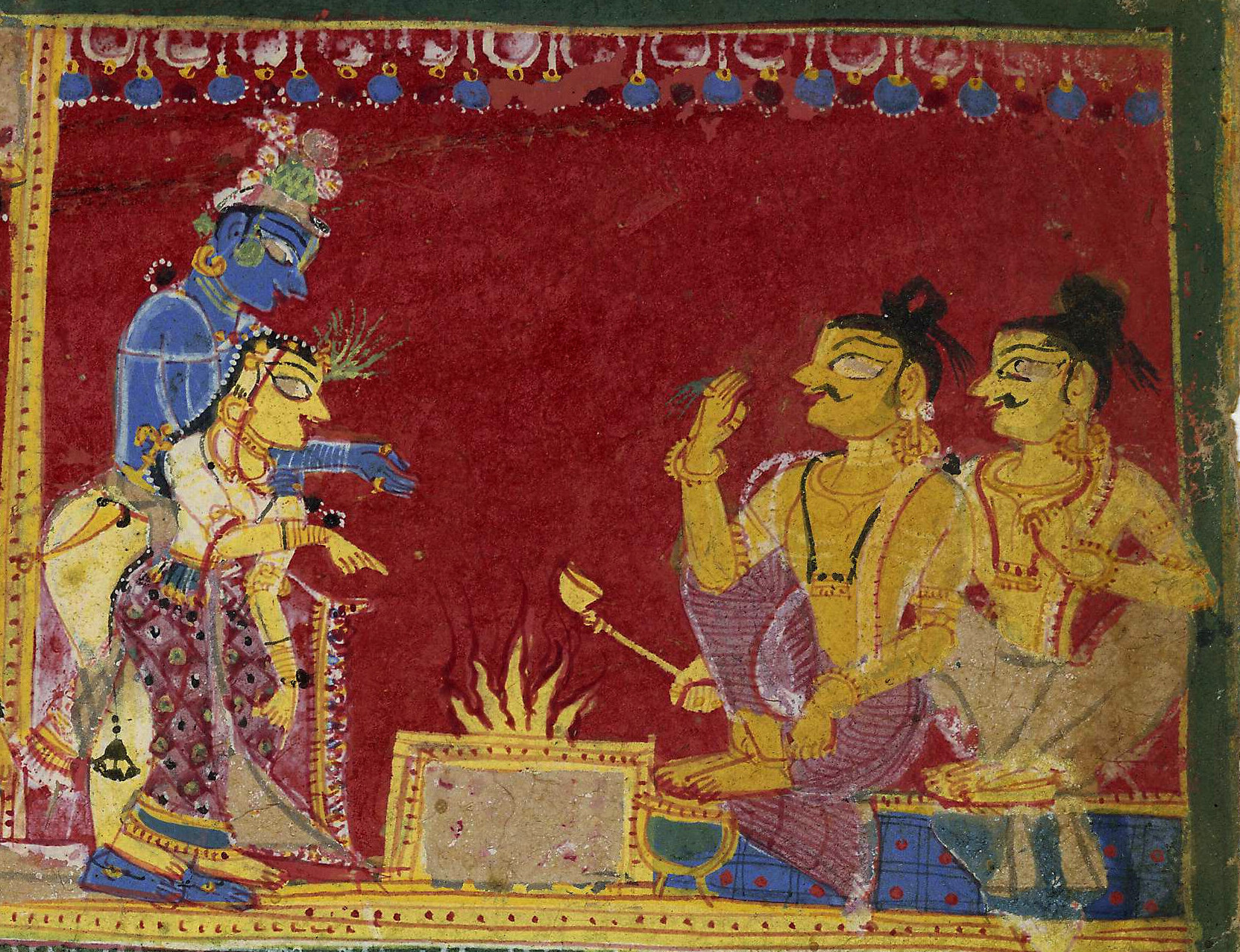
- Wedding of Aniruddha and Rocanā from a manuscript of the Bhāgavata Purāṇa, c. 1500
- Devanagari: अनिरुद्ध
- Affiliation: Vaishnavism, Vrishni
- Texts: Bhagavata Purana, Vishnu Purana, Shiva Purana, Mahabharata

Genealogy
- Parents: Pradyumna (father); Rukmavati (mother)
- Spouse: Rochana and Usha
- Children: Vajra and Mrigaketana
- Dynasty: Yaduvamsha

Aniruddha (Sanskrit: अनिरुद्ध, lit. 'unconquerable') is a character in Hindu mythology, the son of Pradyumna and Rukmavati, and the grandson of Krishna and Rukmini. He is said to have been very much like his grandfather, to the extent that he is considered by some to be a Jana avatar, an avatar of Vishnu. He is a member of the chatur-vyuha, the four Vrishni heroes.

== Early life ==
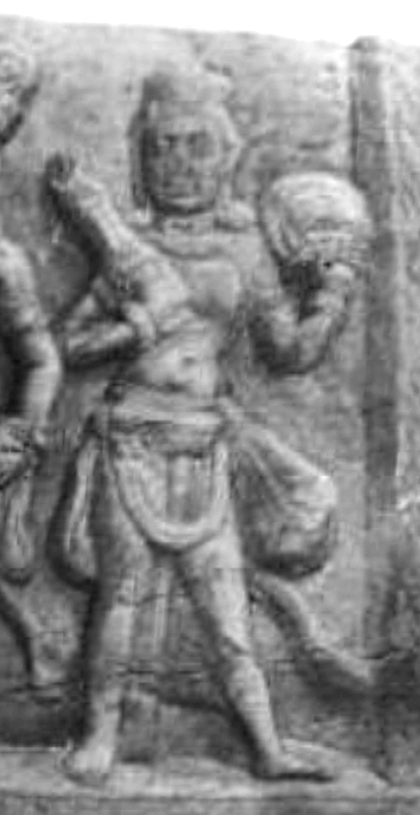
Aniruddha, holding a sword and a shield, in the Kondamotu Vrishni heroes relief, 4th-century CE.

Anirudha was born to Pradyumna and Rukmavati. His mother Rukmavati was the daughter of Rukmi, the king of Vidarbha. He was one of the few Maharathis (strong warriors) of his dynasty. His early life and marriage to his first wife, Rochana, are described in the Bhagavata Purana, Canto 10, Chapter 61.

== Marriages ==
=== Marriage to Rochana ===
Aniruddha's marriage to Rochana is described in the 61st Chapter of the 10th Canto of the Bhagavata Purana. At the behest of his sister Rukmini, Rukmi requested Krishna to have Aniruddha marry Rochana, after the wedding ceremony, Rukmi was killed by Balarama after the former cheated the latter in a game of dice and insulted his Yadava heritage.

=== The Great War and Marriage to Usha ===
Usha comes to Aniruddha during his evening meal, c. 1775

According to the Srimad Bhagavatam, a daitya princess named Usha, a daughter of Banasura (also referred to as Bana), fell in love with Aniruddha after seeing him in her dream and having sex with him.

Banasura, ruling his kingdom from the city of Sonitapura, was the son of Bali and the great grandson of Prahlada. Banasura was a great devotee of Shiva and as a result of a boon granted to him from the deity, had gained 1000 arms. Intoxicated by his prowess, he observed to Shiva that he was the latter's equal, and that he had attempted to fight elephants, but the creatures had grown terrified of him. Shiva, enraged by his words, spoke thus: 'Your flag will be broken, oh fool, when your pride is vanquished in a battle you have with someone like me.'

As per the artistic description of Usha's dream, Chitralekha (In Sanskrit, artist), her friend, drew pictures of many Vrishnis using her special abilities. Usha recognised Aniruddha's picture among all of them. Chitralekha, with her yogic powers and Anima Siddhi, shrunk Aniruddha to the size of a doll and brought him to Usha's palace. She worshipped him and furnished him with priceless garments, garlands, fragrances, lamps, and with beverages, dishes, and words. Breaking her vow of chastity with him, she kept him hidden in her maiden quarters, and the lovers lost track of the days. Catching wind of his daughter's activities, Banasura rushed to her chambers to find her playing dice with doll sized Aniruddha. Even as the prince fended off the guards, Banasura subdued him with the mystical ropes of Varuna due to Aniruddha's shrunken state. Usha was overwhelmed with sorrow due to this incident. Aniruddha was held captive by Banasura for a month, until Narada informed the Yadus in Dvaraka, who were searching for Aniruddha.

The Yadus' army attacked Banasura in a great battle. When the Yadu princes and their army besieged his kingdom with 12 akshauhinis, surrounding it completely, Banasura staged a fierce counterattack. During the war, Shiva appeared on the battlefield, riding on Nandi, to protect his devotee, Banasura. Balarama fought against Banasura's commander, while Samba fought against Banasura's son. To bear witness, the leaders of the godly souls headed by Brahma came in their celestial vehicles, as also the sages, the perfected souls, and the venerable personalities, the singers and apsaras of heaven, and the yakshinis. Krishna and Shiva faced each other. Krishna used a brahmastra against Shiva's brahmastra, a mountain weapon against a wind weapon, a rain weapon against a fire weapon, and his narayanastra against Shiva's pashupatastra. After duelling with Satyaki, Bana took up arms against Krishna. However, Krishna blew his conch and instantly, Banasura's charioteer was killed and his chariot broken and shattered.

In a desperate attempt to save Banasura, Kothara, his mother, stood naked before Krishna with her hair dishevelled. When the deity looked away, the asura fled to the city. When Shiva's forces had been defeated, Jvara, the embodiment of Shiva's fever, bearing three heads and three feet, attacked Krishna with scorching heat. Krishna produced his own Jvara of frigid coldness, and the two fought each other. Overwhelmed by Vishnu's fever, Shiva's Jvara offered its surrender and obeisance to Krishna and departed.

Meanwhile, Balarama defeated Banasura's commander. Bana rode forth upon his chariot to fight with Krishna, and the fought back with his Sudarshana Chakra. When Krishna started chopping Banasura's arms, Shiva returned to his senses and extolled the glories of Krishna, and urged him not to kill Banasura, whom he had bestowed with fearlessness. Obliging, Krishna replied that he had never intended to kill Banasura, since he was the son of Bali and the grandson of the devout Prahlada. Vishnu had promised Bali not to kill any member of his family, and therefore would not slay him. However, Krishna severed Banasura's extra arms to destroy the latter's pride, leaving Banasura with only four arms.

Banasura realised his mistake and bowed his head before Krishna, arranging for a chariot to seat Aniruddha and Usha for their wedding in Dvaraka.

== Children ==
Vajra was the elder son of Aniruddha and his second wife, Usha. He was the only survivor of the Yadu dynasty after a violent disaster due to the curse of Gandhari. Vajra was crowned as the King of Indraprastha on the request of Krishna by the Pandavas after the Yadava fratricide just before the Pandavas' exile. Aniruddha had one more son named Mrigaketana from Rochana.

== Boar Aspect ==
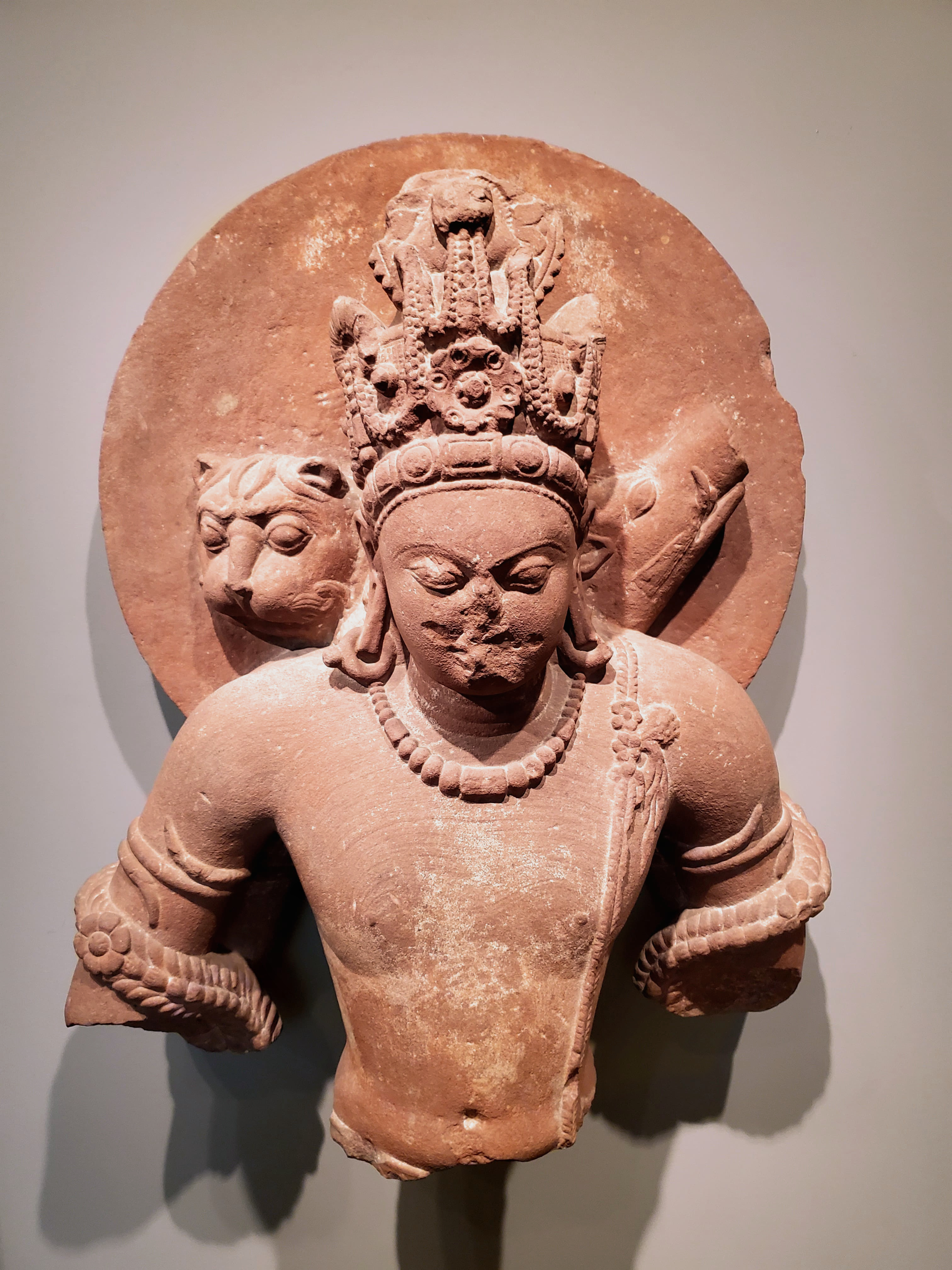
Aniruddha appears as a boar, and Samkarsana appears as a lion in this Vaikuntha Chaturmurti statue, showing Vishnu with his three main emanations, the mid-5th century. Boston Museum.

In Vaishnavism, Aniruddha is associated with the boar, which is his theriomorphic aspect, also known as Varaha. Aniruddha appears as a boar in some of the Caturvyūha statues, where he is an assistant to Vāsudeva, and in the Vaikuntha Chaturmurti when his boar's head protrudes from the side of Vishnu's head.

Aniruddha is also associated with the qualities of ferociousness and sovereignty.

== Death ==
Pradyumna and Aniruddha died in the intoxicated brawl between the Yadavas, which claimed the life of every Yadava prince, except Vajra, who was the only survivor. Arjuna moved the survivors to the kingdom of Indraprastha and crowned Vajra the king.

== Literature ==
The story of Aniruddha and Usha (as Okha in Gujarati, also "Ukha" in Assamese) is depicted in the 18th century Gujarati Akhyana entitled Okhaharan by Premanand Bhatt.

A 1901 Telugu language play titled Usha Parinayam written by Vedam Venkataraya Sastry was based on his love story with Usha.

Aniruddha, which means "unstoppable," is also another name of Vishnu.

Pāñcarātra system
	Vyūhas	Image	Attributes	Symbol	Direction	Face	Concept
Narayana; Vishnu	Vāsudeva		Chakra Wheel; Gadā Mace; Shankha Conch	Garuda Eagle	East	Saumya (Placid/ benevolent)	Jṅāna Knowledge
Narayana; Vishnu	Samkarsana		Lāṅgala Plough; Musala Pestle; Wine glass	Tala Fan palm	South	Simha Lion	Bala Strength
Narayana; Vishnu	Pradyumna		Cāpa Bow; Bāṇa Arrow	Makara Crocodile	West	Raudra Kapila	Aiśvaryā Sovereignty
Narayana; Vishnu	Aniruddha		Carma Shield; Khaḍga Sword	Ṛṣya (ऋष्य) White-footed antelope	North	Varaha Boar	Śakti Power
