= Pradyumna =

Son of Krishna and Rukmini in Hinduism

- An 18th-century Pahari painting of Pradyumna (right) battling with the asura Shambara
- Affiliation: Vaishnavism, Kamadeva
- Abode: Dvaraka
- Texts: Mahabharata, Srimad Bhagavatam, Harivamsa, Pradyumna Charitra

Genealogy
- Parents: Krishna (father); Rukmini (mother)
- Siblings: Charudeshna (brother)
- Spouse: Mayavati; Rukmavati; Prabhavati
- Children: Aniruddha
- Dynasty: Yaduvamsha

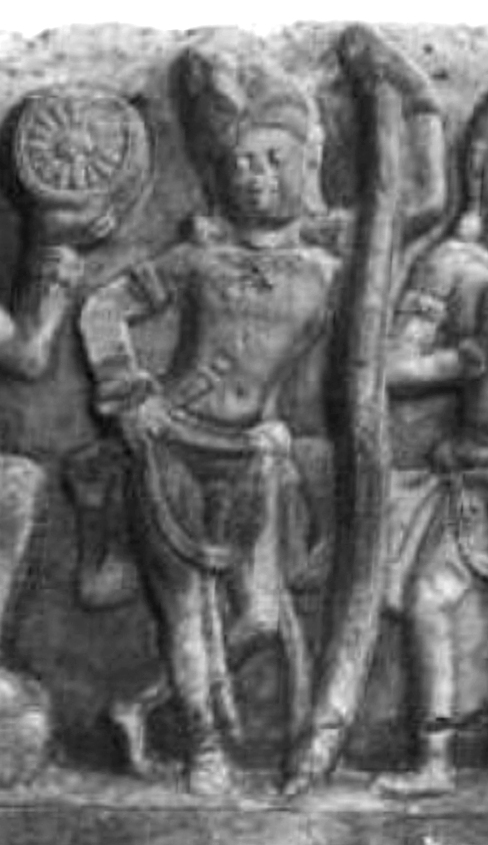
Pradyumna, holding a bow and an arrow, in the Kondamotu Vrishni heroes relief, 4th century CE

Pradyumna (Sanskrit: प्रद्युम्न, lit. 'the eminently mighty one') is the eldest son of the Hindu deities Krishna and his chief consort Rukmini. He is considered to be one of the four vyuha avatars of Vishnu. According to the Bhagavata Purana, Pradyumna was the reincarnation of Kamadeva, the god of love. The Mahabharata states that Pradyumna was a portion of Sanat Kumara.

The Harivamsa describes the chaturvyuha, consisisting of the Vrishni heroes Vāsudeva, Samkarsana, Pradyumna, and Aniruddha, that would later be the basis for the Vaishnava concept of primary quadrupled expansion, or avatara.

Pradyumna is also another name of the Hindu god Vishnu, listed as one of his 24 keshava namas (names of Vishnu).

== Legend ==
=== Birth and early life ===
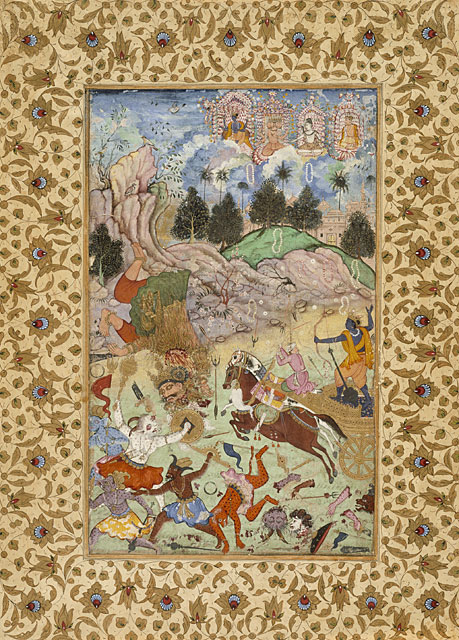
Pradyumna kills Sambara.

Pradyumna is the son of the deity Krishna and his consort, Rukmini. According to the Bhagavata Purana, Pradyumna is the reincarnation of Kamadeva, the god of love, who had previously been incinerated by the destructive wrath of the god Shiva. His mother, Rukmini, was the princess of Vidarbha, whom Krishna had famously rescued and eloped with during her royal wedding ceremonies.

Before the infant was ten days old, he was kidnapped from his mother's chamber by the asura Shambara. Shambara, who had foreseen that the child was prophesied to be his destroyer, hurled the infant into the ocean. Miraculously, the baby survived by being swallowed whole by a massive fish. This fish was later caught by local fishermen and presented to Shambara's royal kitchen. When the cooks sliced the fish open to prepare it, they discovered the living child inside and handed him over to a maidservant named Mayavati. Unbeknownst to Shambara, Mayavati was the earthly incarnation of Rati, the divine consort of Kamadeva. Having been informed of the child's true identity by the celestial sage Narada, Mayavati secretly raised the boy.

As Pradyumna matured into adulthood, Mayavati began to express romantic and amorous feelings toward him. Confused and uncomfortable, Pradyumna reprimanded her for behaving inappropriately, as he had always viewed her as a maternal figure. In response, Mayavati revealed the truth of his parentage, detailing his kidnapping by Shambara and his true identity as the son of Krishna. To aid him in fulfilling his destiny, she taught him a potent mystical science known as mahamaya, a spell designed to counteract and dispel all forms of dark magic and illusions. Armed with this mystical knowledge, Pradyumna openly challenged Shambara to a duel.

The fierce battle saw Shambara utilizing a wide array of demonic illusions and magical warfare tactics commonly associated with celestial beings such as gandharvas, guhyakas, pishachas, and nagas. Pradyumna systematically neutralized these magical assaults using the mahamaya spell and ultimately decapitated the asura with a sword.

Following his victory, Pradyumna and his wife Mayavati magically transported themselves through the sky, arriving directly inside the royal women's quarters in the city of Dvaraka. Because Pradyumna shared striking physical features with his father, including a dark-blue complexion, yellow garments, and curly hair, the women of the palace initially mistook him for Krishna himself. However, Rukmini experienced a profound maternal intuition upon seeing him and deduced that the young man was her long-lost son. The reunion was formalized when Krishna, along with his parents Vasudeva and Devaki, arrived at the scene. The sage Narada recounted the tale of Pradyumna's survival and victory, leading to widespread rejoicing among the royal family and the citizens of Dvaraka.

=== Marriages ===
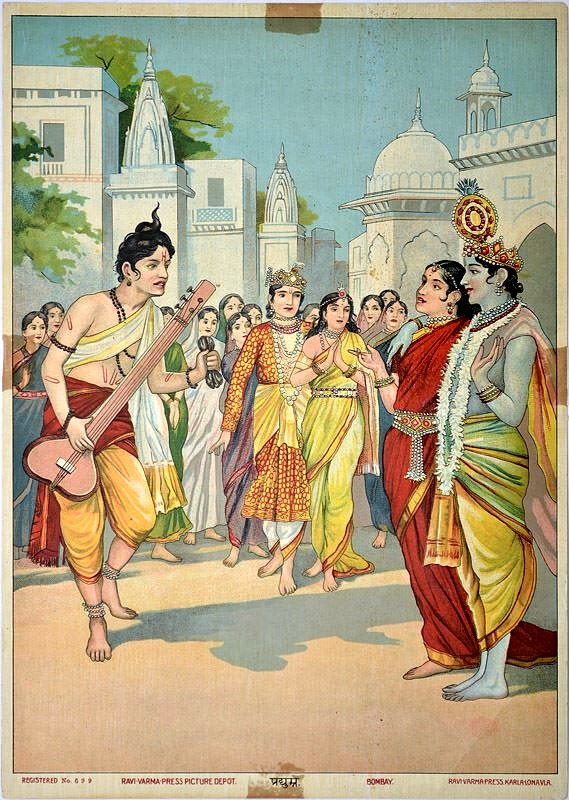
Narada (left) and Krishna - Rukmini (right) welcome Pradyumna and Mayavati (centre).

Pradyumna's first wife was Mayavati, the incarnation of Kamadeva's wife Rati. At first, Pradyumna objected, but upon explanation, he realised that she was, in fact, his eternal consort. He also married Rukmavati, the daughter of his maternal uncle, Rukmi. It is said that Princess Rukmavati found his valour, comeliness, and charm beyond words, and insisted on marrying him at her svayamvara. With her, he fathered, Krishna's grandson and favourite, and also considered a vyuha avatar of Vishnu, Aniruddha. Prabhavati was an asura princess who fell in love with Pradyumna, and so he eloped with her.

=== Role in Dvaraka ===
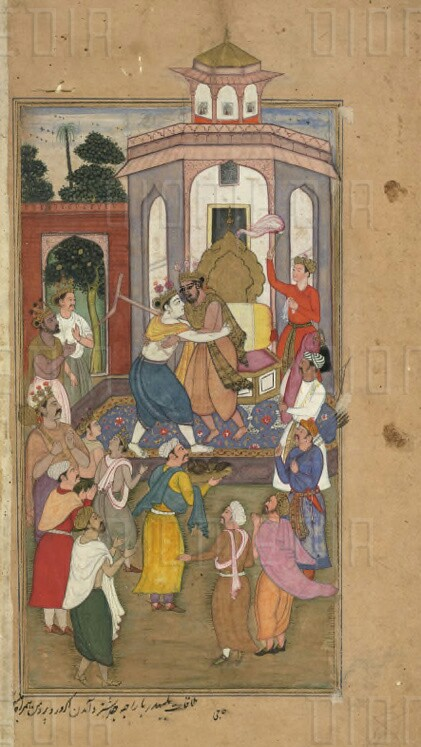
Balarama embraces Yudhisthira, accompanied by Akrura and Pradyumna before their pilgrimage.

Soon, Pradyumna became a constant companion of his father Krishna and was well-liked by the people of Dvaraka. Pradyumna was a mighty Maharathi warrior. He possessed the extremely rare Vaishnavastra, which was one of the most powerful weapons in the universe. He was one of the very few people to know the secret of the Chakravyuha. According to the Mahabharata, Pradyumna trained Abhimanyu and the Draupadeyas in warfare when the Pandavas were in exile. But Pradyumna did not participate in the Kurukshetra War as he went on a pilgrimage with his uncle Balarama and the other Yadavas. He was, however, an active participant in the Ashvamedha Yagna, which was later conducted by Yudhishthira.

=== Defence of Dvaraka ===
Pradyumna defended Dvaraka against Shalva, the king of the Shalva Kingdom, along with his father, uncle and brothers. In the Harivamsa, Pradyumna alone repelled the attack of Jarasandha.

=== Death ===
Pradyumna was later killed in an intoxicated brawl, along with all the other members of the Yadava clan. His grandson, Vajra, was the only survivor of Yadu lineage after this incident.

== Epithets ==
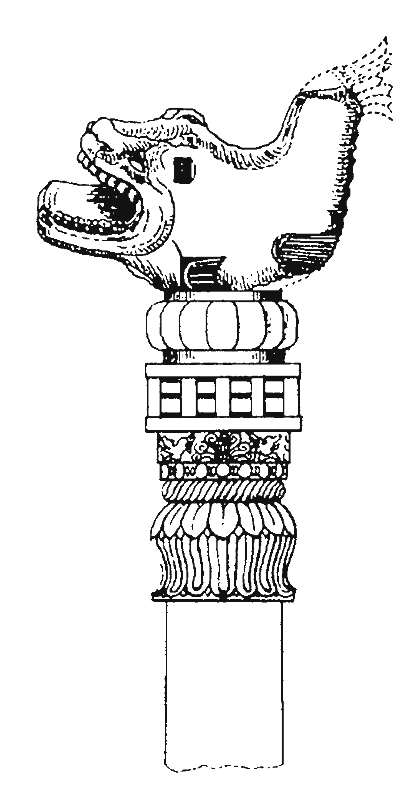
The Makara, as the one found on a pillar capital at the site of the Heliodorus pillar, is associated with Pradyumna. 2nd century BCE. Gwalior Museum.

One of the epithets of Pradyumna in literature, such as in Harivamsa 99, is "Makaradhvaja", meaning "he whose banner or standard is the crocodile". A pillar capital with the effigy of a Makara crocodile found at Besnagar near the Heliodorus pillar dedicated to Vasudeva, is also attributed to Pradyumna. In the Mahabharata, the Makara is associated with Krishna's son and Kamadeva, the god of love, suggesting that they are identical.

== Descendants ==
As per the Bhagavata Purana, Canto 10, Chapter 61, Aniruddha was the son of Pradyumna and Rukmavati. He was later abducted by Usha (daughter of Bana asura and granddaughter of Mahabali), who wished to marry him. Usha's father, Banasura, however, imprisoned Aniruddha, creating a battle between Krishna and Shiva. In the battle, Pradyumna defeated Shiva's son Kartikeya, who fled on his peacock. At the end of the war, Banasura lost, and Aniruddha and Usha were married. Aniruddha is said to have been very much like his grandfather Krishna, to the extent that some consider him to be a jana avatar, an avatar of Vishnu. Aniruddha's son was Vajra. Vajra was known to be an invincible warrior and was the only survivor of the Yadu Dynasty after the Yadus' battle. According to some sources, Vajra then had 16 idols of Krishna and other gods carved from a rare, imperishable stone called Braja and built temples to house these idols in and around Mathura so as to feel the presence of Krishna. It is said that Pradyumna and Arjuna were equivalent in their skills.

== In Jainism ==
In Jain tradition, Pradyumna is described as the son of Krishna and Rukmini, and as a Kamadeva, a famous heroic figure known for beauty and charm. Jain scriptures say that names such as Manmatha, Madana, Kāma, and Kāmadeva were all used for him, and that he held the rank of Kamadeva.

The Jain Pradyumna Charitra gives several dramatic episodes from his life. Jealous princes repeatedly send him into dangerous places, but each time he comes back with new gifts. After defeating the guardian of a tank, he receives a makara-banner and becomes known as Makaraketu. Later, after defeating a demon in the Kāla forest, he receives a flower-bow and five flower-arrows, and the text says that from then on he truly bore the name Madana or Kāmadeva. The same work says that he married Rati, the daughter of the Vidyadhara Prabhanjana, and later married many other princesses, including Udadhi-kumari.

In the end, the story turns toward renunciation. After hearing Neminatha's teaching and learning that Dvaraka would one day be destroyed, Pradyumna asks Krishna for permission to leave worldly life. He takes Jain initiation on Girnar, practises severe austerities, attains kevala jnana, and finally reaches moksha there.

In Jain tradition, most of these episodes of life events of Pradyumana are told in Somkirti Acharya's Pradyumna Charitra, and Pradyumna is also described as a Kamadeva in the later summary Sanksipta Jain Mahabharata.

== Texts ==
The Hindu version of the history of Pradyumna is mentioned in Bhagavata Purana and Harivamsa.

The Jain version of the story of Pradyumna is mentioned in the Pradyumna-charitra (poem in 18 canons) of Rajchandra, written in 1878 AD.

Pāñcarātra system
| | Vyūhas | Image | Attributes | Symbol | Direction | Face | Concept |
|---|---|---|---|---|---|---|---|
| Narayana; Vishnu | Vāsudeva | | Chakra Wheel; Gadā Mace; Shankha Conch | Garuda Eagle | East | Saumya (Placid/ benevolent) | Jṅāna Knowledge |
| Narayana; Vishnu | Samkarsana | | Lāṅgala Plough; Musala Pestle; Wine glass | Tala Fan palm | South | Simha Lion | Bala Strength |
| Narayana; Vishnu | Pradyumna | | Cāpa Bow; Bāṇa Arrow | Makara Crocodile | West | Raudra Kapila | Aiśvaryā Sovereignty |
| Narayana; Vishnu | Aniruddha | | Carma Shield; Khaḍga Sword | Ṛṣya (ऋष्य) White-footed antelope | North | Varaha Boar | Śakti Power |
