= Charudeshna =

Son of Krishna

- Abode: Dvaraka
- Texts: Harivamsa, Mahabharata, Bhagavata Purana, Ganesha Purana, Bhavishya Purana

Genealogy
- Parents: Krishna (father); Rukmini (mother)
- Siblings: Pradyumna (brother)
- Dynasty: Yaduvamsha

Charudeshna (Sanskrit: चारुदेष्ण, romanized: Cārudeṣṇa, lit. 'beautiful desire') is a son of Krishna and his chief consort Rukmini in Hinduism, belonging to the Yadava dynasty. In some traditions, he is regarded as an incarnation of Ganesha.

== Literature ==
According to the Mahabharata Tatparya Nirnaya, a text attributed to Madhvacharya (20.140–142), Krishna is described as having ten sons and one daughter from each of his principal queens. Among these offspring, Pradyumna, Samba, Bhanu, and Charudeshna are identified as possessing superior qualities, including strength, character, and abilities. The text further states that Charudeshna, born to Rukmini, is described as an incarnation of Vighnaraja (Ganesha).

According to the Ganesha Purana (Chapter 5, Verse 35), Charudeshna is described as a divine manifestation of Ganesha, who is said to bring joy to his devotees.

The Bhavishya Purana (Pratisarga Parva 5.40) identifies Charudeshna, the son of Rukmini, as an incarnation of Ganesha, portraying him as a powerful and illuminating figure for devotees.
