= Bhishmaka =

Father of Rukmini in Hinduism

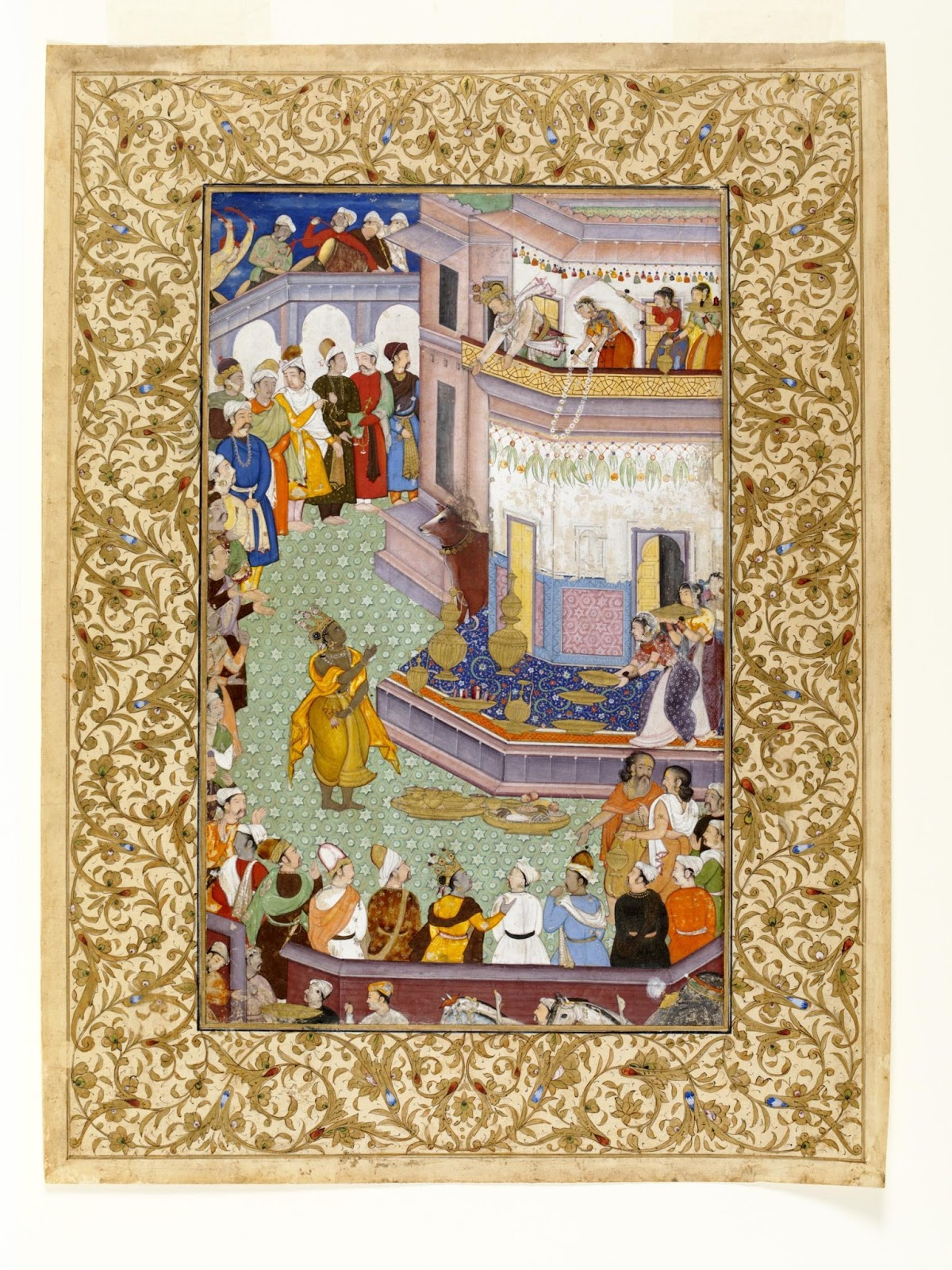
- Bhishmaka meets Krishna
- Texts: Harivamsha, Puranas
- Region: Vidarbha

Genealogy
- Children: Rukmi, Rukmini

Bhishmaka (Sanskrit: भीष्मक, romanized: Bhīshmaka), also called Hiranyaroman, is the king of Vidarbha In Hinduism. He is the father of Rukmini, the chief wife of Krishna and an incarnation of the goddess Lakshmi.

== Legend ==
=== Skanda Purana ===
The Skanda Purana describes Bhishmaka to be a wealthy and powerful monarch. At the time of the birth of Rukmini, the text describes a celestial voice instructing him to marry his daughter to a four-armed one (Caturbhujā) who had been born on earth. After eight years, he betroths his daughter to Shishupala upon the insistence of the latter's father, Damaghosha, who tells him that Caturbhujā was an epithet of his son. His daughter Rukmini was against marriage and wished to marry her childhood love Krishna and send letter to him to take her away from her marriage. Krishna and Balarama are invited to her marriage ceremony by Bhishmaka, upon which Krishna elopes with his daughter and gets marriage like she wished.

=== Harivamsha ===
In the Harivamsha, when the king Bhishmaka's eldest son Rukmi chooses to marry his sister Rukmini off to suitors through a svayamvara ceremony, the king opposes Rukmi's decision, regarding it to be bad conduct on his part. When the king grants an audience to Krishna, he begs the god's forgiveness for this folly, upon which the latter agrees with his opinion, revealing that the bride was in fact Lakshmi, the goddess of prosperity. He assures the king that this was no sin on his part. Bhishmaka offers many exultations of Krishna before the god's departure.

Bhishmaka argues with Shishupala, Cleveland Museum of Art

=== Malinithan ===
A legend was implanted around Malinithan by Srimanta Sankardev in the 16th century, connecting the place to the mythological king of Bhishmaka (Lord of Vidarbha) of the epics. The association of the legend with the place led to a widespread renaming of the Eastern Assam and Eastern Arunachala Pradesh regions.

== Sources ==
- Shin, Jae-Eun (2020). "Descending from demons, ascending to kshatriyas: Genealogical claims and political process in pre-modern Northeast India, The Chutiyas and the Dimasas". The Indian Economic and Social History Review. 57 (1): 49–75. doi:10.1177/0019464619894134. S2CID 213213265.
