= Kundina =

- town
- Location in Maharashtra, India
- Coordinates: 20.55°N 77.45°E
- Country: India
- State: Maharashtra
- District: Wardha
- Named for

Languages
  - Official: Marathi
- Time zone: UTC+5:30 (IST)

Kundina is an ancient Indian city, named as part of Kanishka's territory in the Rabatak inscription. It is thought that is it the locality of Kaundinyapura on the Wardha River in the Amravati Division of Vidarbha, or Berar in Maharashtra, which is an archaeological site identified as a trading city during the Early Historic period (c. 3rd century BCE to 4th century CE).
