= Kimpurushas =

Race in Hindu mythology

The kimpurushas (Sanskrit: किंपुरुष, romanized: Kimpuruṣa) are a race of beings featured in Hindu literature, described as possessing the bodies of human beings and lion heads. They are associated with, and sometimes considered the same as the kinnaras, though some Puranas distinguish between them. They are attendants of the god of wealth, Kubera.

== Literature ==
=== Bhagavata Purana ===
Brahma is described to have created the kimpurushas and the kinnaras from his own reflected image.

The kimpurushas, along with a number of other beings, praise the glory of the Narasimha avatar of Vishnu after he slays Hiranyakashipu.

The beings sing the praises of Mahabali for his selfless deed of offering the three worlds to the Vamana avatar of Vishnu.

=== Ramayana ===
Budha transforms a number of women into kimpurushis (female kimpurushas) and instructs them to make a mountain their abode and take kimpurushas for their consorts.

=== Tirumurai ===
The poet-saint Appar references the kimpurushas as one among the eighteen classes in his hymns.

=== Kumarasambhavam ===
Kalidasa, the poet, describes Kimpurusha women as having "bright lips and whitened faces" with leaf patterns drawn on their skin (p. 105).

== See also ==
- Kinnaras
- Yakshas
- Gandharvas
