= Rukmini =

Hindu goddess and chief consort of the god Krishna

- Mother Goddess; Goddess of Fortune
- Member of Ashtabharya
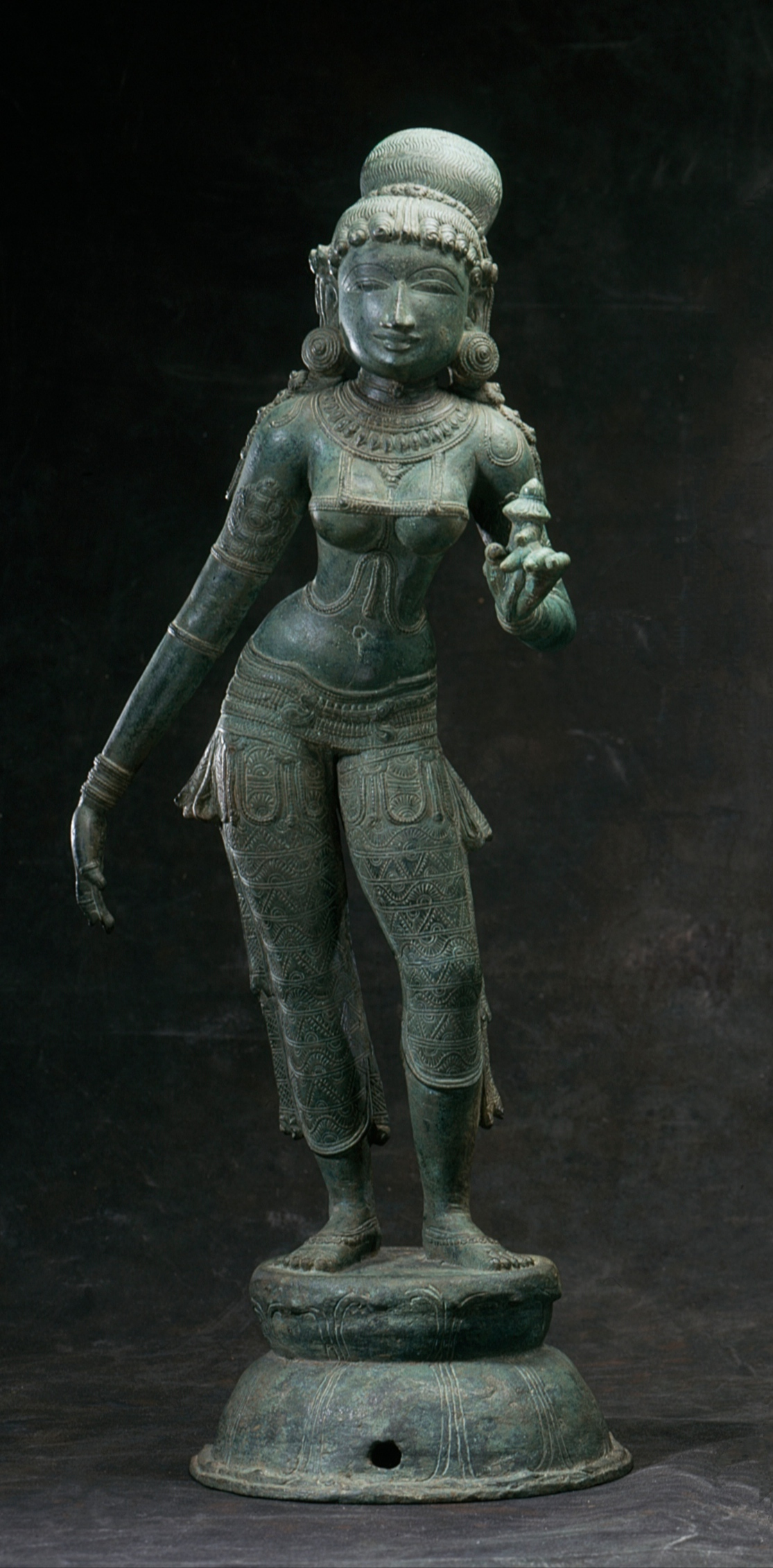
- 12th-13th century sculpture of Rukmini
- Other names: Vaidarbhi; Bhaishmi; Rakhumai; Shri; Krishnatmika; Dvarikeshvari
- Devanagari: रूक्मिणी
- Venerated in: Warkari Vaishnavism; Haridasa; Sri Vaishnavism
- Affiliation: Devi; Avatar of Lakshmi
- Abode: Vidarbha; Dvārakā; Pandharpur; Vaikuntha
- Texts: Vishnu Purana, Bhagavata Purana, Mahabharata, Harivamsa, Rukminisha Vijaya, Skanda Purana, Padma Purana‚ Brahma Vaivarta Purana‚ Garga Samhita‚ Garuda Purana, Gopala Tapani Upanishad, Yadavabhyudaya
- Temples: Rukmini Devi Temple; Vithoba Temple
- Festivals: Rukmini Ashtami; Pandharpur Vari; Madhavpur Ghed; Vasanthotsavam; Rukmini Harana Ekadashi; Aashadhi Ekadashi

Genealogy
- Avatar birth: Vidarbha Kingdom
- Avatar end: Dvārakā
- Parents: Bhishmaka (father)
- Siblings: Rukmi
- Consort: Krishna
- Children: Pradyumna, Charudeshna and 8 others sons and Charumati (daughter)
- Dynasty: Yaduvamsha

Rukmini (Sanskrit: रुक्मिणी, lit. 'radiant', IAST: Rukmiṇī) is a Hindu goddess and the first queen consort of Krishna. She is described as the chief of Krishna's wives in Dvaraka. Rukmini is revered as the avatar of Lakshmi and is venerated primarily in Warkari, Haridasa, and Sri Vaishnavism.

Rukmini is mainly worshipped in Dwarka, Maharashtra and South India. The people of Maharashtra venerate her with Vithoba (a regional form of Krishna) and call her Rakhumai. In South India, she is worshipped along with Krishna and his other primary consort Satyabhama. Her birthday is celebrated every year on the occasion of Rukmini Ashtami.

== Etymology and epithets ==
The name Rukmini is derived from the Sanskrit word Rukma which means 'radiant', 'clear' or 'bright'. The name can also mean 'decorated with gold ornaments'. Other names and epithets include:

- Shri – Lakshmi
- Vaidarbhi – She who is from the kingdom of Vidarbha
- Bhaishmi – Daughter of Bhishmaka
- Krishnatmika – Soul of Krishna
- Rakhumai – Mother Rukmini
- Chiryauvana – One who is forever young
- Pradyumna Janani – Mother of Pradyumna

== Legends ==
=== Birth ===
According to the epic Mahabharata and other Puranic scriptures, Princess Rukmini was born to Bhishmaka—the king of Vidarbha kingdom, belonging to the Bhoja dynasty. She had five elder brothers—Rukmi, Rukmaratha, Rukmabahu, Rukmakesa and Rukmanetra. Puranas such as Vishnu Purana, Bhagavata Purana, and Padma Purana praise her as an incarnation of Goddess Lakshmi, the wife of God Vishnu.

=== Marriage to Krishna ===
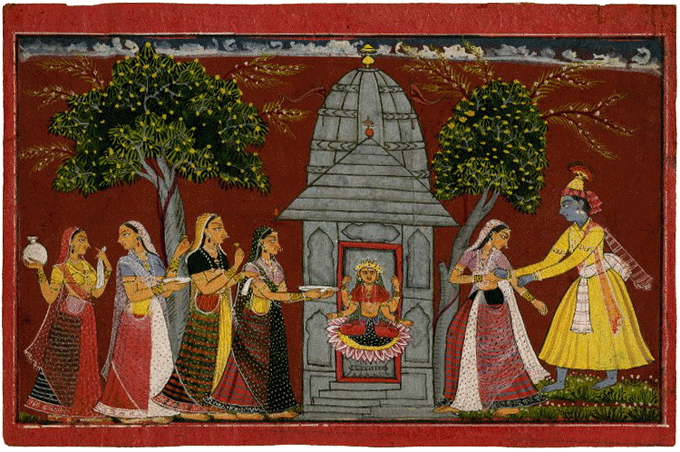
A painting depicting Rukmini eloping with Krishna from a temple of Ambika (Parvati).

The Bhagavata Purana narrates that Rukmini once heard about Krishna and his heroic deeds, such as slaying the tyrant king Kamsa, and opposing the evil king Jarasandha. She fell in love with him and desired to marry him. The episode of Rukmini Kalyanam, and the devotion of Rukmini towards her desired husband is narrated by the sage Shuka to King Parikshit.

Rukmini's parents rejoiced and gave their permission, but Rukmi – who was an ally of Jarasandha – strongly opposed it. Instead, he proposed that she marry his friend Shishupala— the crown prince of Chedi Kingdom, and a cousin of Krishna. (Note: Shishupala was also a vassal and close associate of Jarasandha and hence an ally of Rukmi.) Bhishmaka agreed, and a distressed Rukmini immediately sent for a trusted Brahmin and asked him to deliver a message to Krishna. In the message, she wrote to Krishna about her love and asked him to abduct her when she visited the temple of Goddess Ambika (Parvati) before her wedding. Krishna, having received the message in Dvaraka, told the messenger to inform Rukmini that he had received her letter and would come to make her his wife. Krishna then immediately set out for Vidarbha with Balarama, his elder brother.

Meanwhile, in Vidarbha's capital Kundina, Bhishmaka had prepared for Rukmini's marriage. Rukmini grew anxious as she observed the host of kings, wondering if the Brahmin she had dispatched had not reached safely or not, and if the Almighty would assist her in her efforts. Her face grew pale and her thoughts grew distressed as she shunned herself from the rest of the world. Her sorrow of Krishna not having yet arrived to marry her yet was so immense that she refused to eat, sing to her parrot, or play her lyre. Shishupala, along with his allies including Jarasandha had arrived. Krishna and Balarama had also arrived, and Bhishmaka welcomed them. At the palace, Rukmini had lost all hope, but the messenger turned up and informed that Krishna had accepted her request. The next day, she went to the temple to offer her prayers to Ambika. As she proceeded towards the wedding venue, she saw Krishna and he soon swept her into his chariot with him. All of Jarasandha's forces quickly started chasing them, but they were repulsed by Balarama and his army. In an account slightly differing from that of the Bhagavata Purana, in the play "Rukmini Horon" by the 15th-century Assamese playwright Srimanta Sankaradeva, Uddhava too accompanies Krishna in his campaign."

Rukmi chased after Krishna and Rukmini. He challenged Krishna to a fight, but was easily overpowered by the former. Rukmini begged Krishna to spare her brother's life, and the latter agreed. However, he shaved Rukmi's hair and moustache as a mark of punishment, and let him go free. Krishna and Rukmini reached Dvaraka, where they were welcomed with great pomp and ceremony, followed by a wedding.

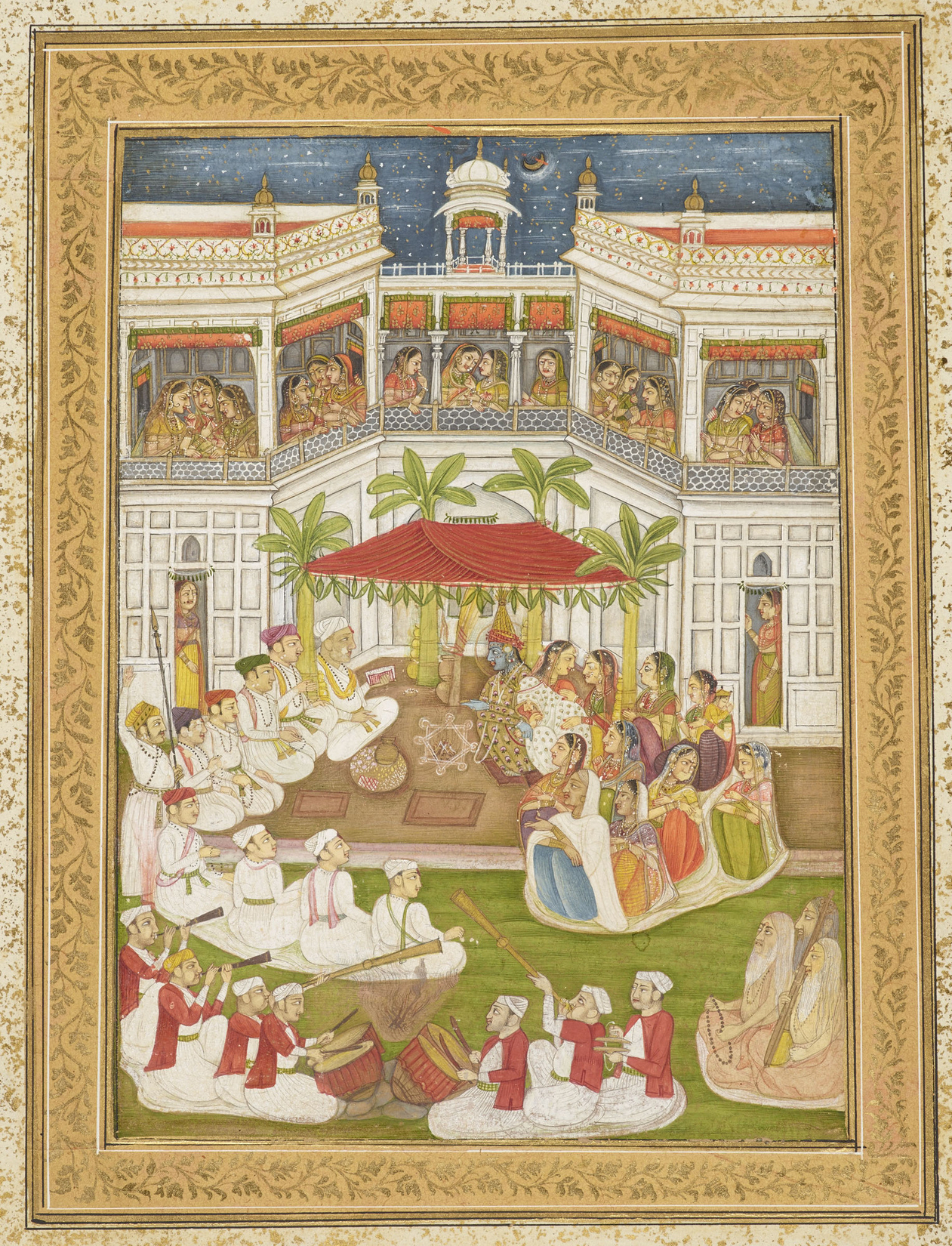
Late 18th century painting of the wedding of Krishna and Rukmini

=== Krishna's ruse ===
The Bhagavata Purana describes an episode through the sage Shuka where the yet unwed Rukmini takes a bejewelled whisk and starts fanning her prospective husband Krishna, wearing an expensive girdle and a dazzling necklace. Even though he is pleased, Krishna points to the fact that the princess had been desired by a number of handsome and energetic monarchs and states that he was not their equal, and that he had also almost lost his realm rescuing her. He remarks that she had not been far-sighted in choosing him as her groom and that she must now instead choose a Kshatriya like her. Rukmini's heart shuddered, her red nails scratched the floor, and tears flowed from her eyes that were decorated with collyrium. She fell to the floor, her hair dishevelled. Krishna swiftly raised her back to her feet and assures her that he was merely joking, as householders do with their beloved. Her fear of abandonment seeping away from her, the princess eulogises him, praising his glories and addressing him as her atman, her sense of self. Krishna praises her single-minded devotion to him.

=== Married life and children ===
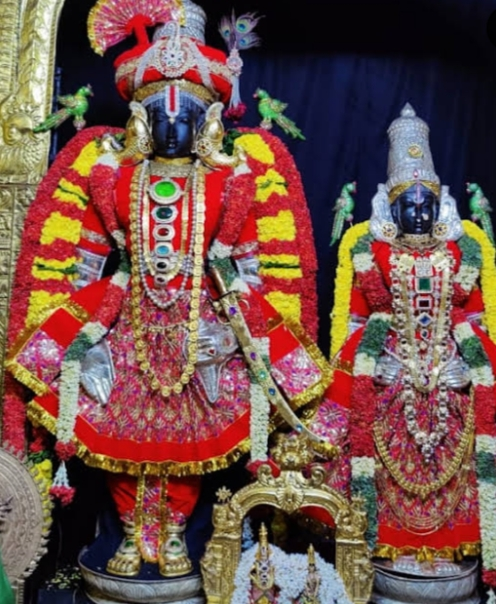
Statue of Vittala Rakhumai, Thennangur

Though Krishna married many other women, Rukmini remained his chief consort and the queen of Dvaraka. When she longed for a child, Krishna flew to Kailash upon his mount Garuda, and expressed his wife's desire to Shiva. Obliging, Shiva blessed Rukmini to be the bearer of the new incarnation of Kamadeva, whom he had previously immolated with his third eye. Thus was Pradyumna born. Many scriptures have mentioned that Rukmini and other wives of Krishna lived like sisters.

The Bhagavata Purana and Vishnu Purana states that Rukmini and Krishna had ten sons—Pradyumna, Charudeshna, Sudeshna, Charudeha, Sucharu, Charugupta, Bhadracharu, Charuchandra, Vicharu, and Charu. In the Harivamsa, Rukmini's sons are Pradyumna, Charudeshna, Charuchandra, Charugarbha, Sudangstra, Druma, Sushena, Charugupta, Charuvinda, and Chharuvahu. A different listing is found in Anushasana Parva of the Mahabharata, where Pradyumna, Charudeshna, Sucharu, Charuvesa, Yasodhana, Charusravas, Charuyasas, and Sambhu are Rukmini's sons. Vishnu Puran also mentioned that Rukmini had a daughter named Charumati.

=== Tale of the scales (Tulabharam) ===
According to a folktale of Odisha, the divine sage Narada once arrived in Dvaraka and asked for Krishna to be given to him as alms. Krishna's 8 queens requested him to take anything else and Narada asked them to give wealth equal to Krishna's weight. They arranged for a big scale (Tulabharama) to be put up. Satyabhama put all of her coins, gems and jewellery on the scale, but it doesn't budge. Other wives gave their jewels, but it was of no use. At last, Rukmini came and put a single leaf of Tulasi on the scale and chanted that it represented her love for Krishna. The scales then became balanced. Though this story is absent in the main scriptures pertaining to Krishna's life, it is often repeated to enunciate the worth of Rukmini's love over Satyabhama's material wealth. The only known versions of this story are from Padma Purana and Devi Bhagvata Purana, where Satyabhama succeeds in weighing Krishna normally with gold items.

=== Meeting Sudama ===
In the Bhagavata Purana, another well-known incident in Rukmini's married life is narrated. When Krishna's childhood friend, Sudama, visited Dvaraka, Rukmini welcomed Sudama and gave him food. She and Krishna fanned him as he rested from his long journey. This type of devotion is a characteristic of Rukmini, an attribute of her that is prevalent.

=== Durvasa's curse ===
According to the Skanda Purana, the famously short-tempered sage Durvasa met Krishna and Rukmini when he was on a pilgrimage. Durvasa asked the couple to be yoked onto his chariot while he held the reins. In the process of pulling the chariot forward, Rukmini grew exhausted and requested Krishna for water. Krishna struck his foot against the ground causing a spring of the Ganga river to appear. Observing her quench her thirst without seeking his permission, the infuriated Durvasa cursed her to be separated from her beloved Krishna. Rukmini grew perturbed and started to cry. To pacify her, Krishna blessed her with the boon that if his devotees were to only see him and not her, they would receive only half the merit.

Despite this consolation, Rukmini grew distressed due to her separation from her consort and fell unconscious. The sea-god and the sage Narada arrived to comfort her. Narada informed her that her husband - a manifestation of Vishnu - was the Supreme Being himself, he rhetorically wondered how she could expect to keep his company in an exclusive garden. The sea affirmed the divine sage's words, promising her that as the companion of Vishnu, she would always retain her permanence in his being. The goddess Bhagirathi, the personification of the Ganga, produced a richly-endowed forest on the spot, laden with fruits and flowers, quickly to be frequented by the inhabitants of Dvaraka. Durvasa vengefully burnt the forest with his powers. Rukmini grew depressed and contemplated giving up her human form. Krishna arrived and stopped her. She felt ashamed and furious with herself even as her husband reassured her of his devotion. The repentant Durvasa begged Krishna to reunite with Rukmini, and the deity consented, blessing the sage with virtue as well as saluting the river Ganga, who then became the liberator of sorrows.

=== Death ===
After the disappearance of Krishna following the Yadu massacre in the Mausala Parva, Rukmini, along with Jambavati, self-immolated herself on the funeral pyre.

== Iconography ==
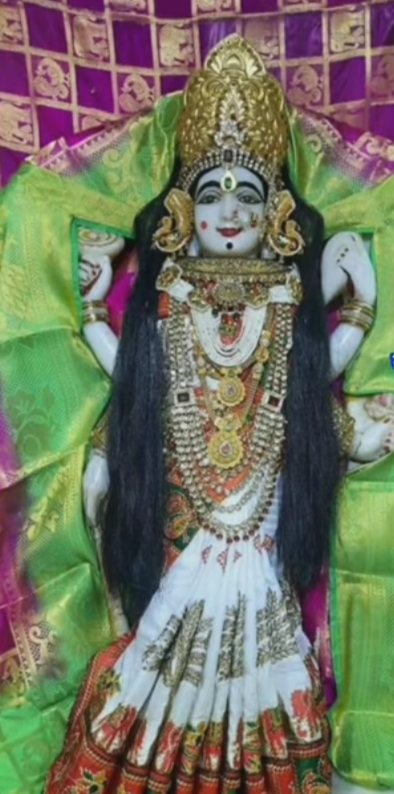
Rukmini with shanka, chakra and gada in Rukmini Temple, Dwaraka

In many texts, the Brahman dispatched by Rukmini to request Krishna to elope with her on her svayamvara describes the princess poetically as bearing beautiful hands, braided tresses, and a face that resembles the moon. She is consistently described as beautiful in other accounts.

Rukmini as mentioned in Hindu traditions, stands for the majesty and wealth of Krishna. Vadiraja Tirtha in Rukminisha Vijaya, describes her as Krishna's supreme beloved consort. In south Indian iconographic tradition, Rukmini, along with Satyabhama, appear as the primary consorts of Krishna.

According to the Vaikhanasagama, Rukmini should be depicted on the right side of Krishna, her image golden-yellow in complexion. Her hair is supposed to be tied up in a fashionable knot, and should also be adorned with flowers. Her right arm should be hanging down, and she should hold a lotus in her left hand. She is supposed to be adorned with various ornaments.

== Literature and symbolism ==
Rukmini is revered as the goddess of fortune, and is primarily represented alongside rishna. An avatar of Lakshmi, she is the chief and most beloved consort and shakti (power) of Krishna in various scriptures of Hindu traditions.

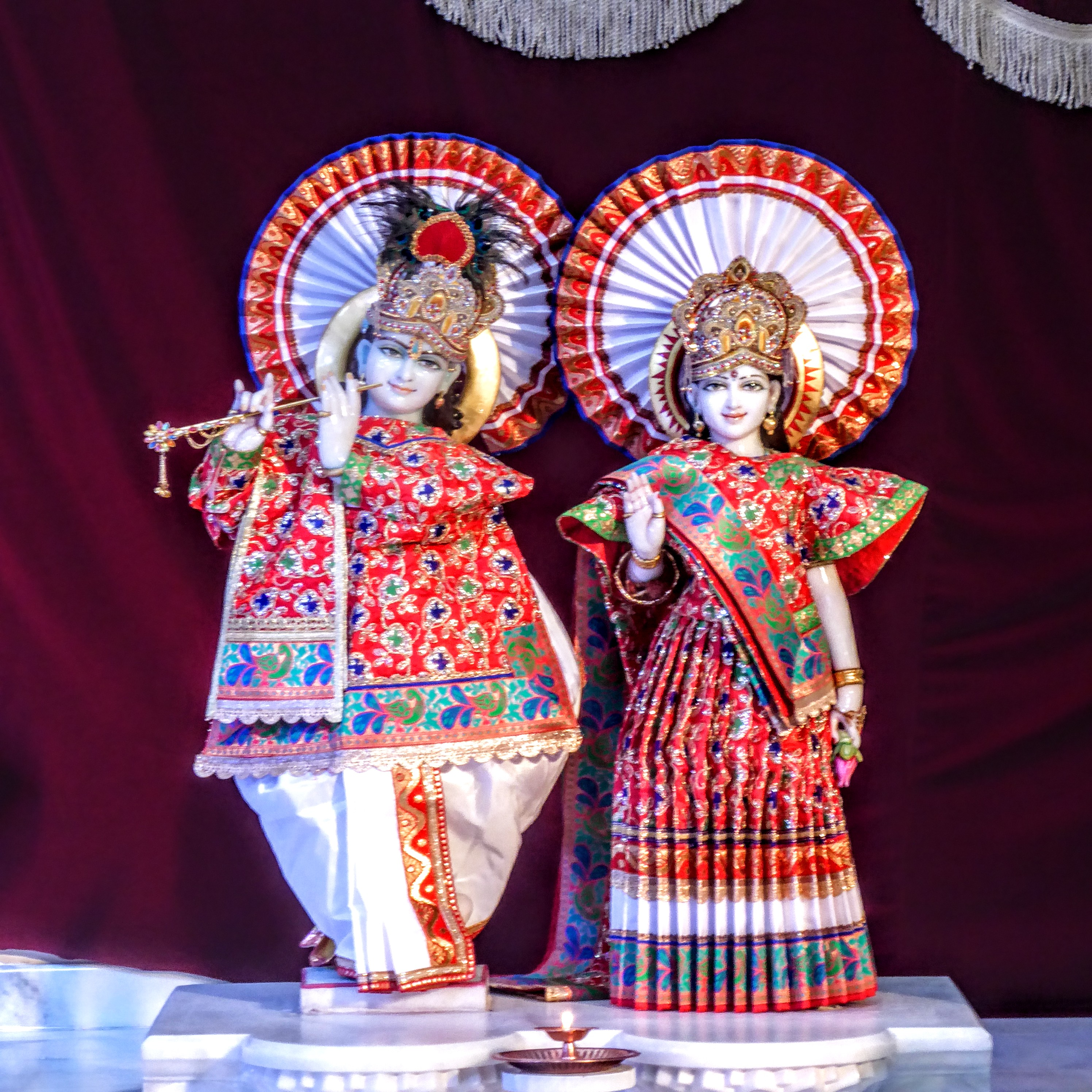
Krishna and Rukmini at Temple Sri Sanatan, Montreal. Rukmini always appears on the left side of Krishna.

Rukmini finds her mention in Gopala Tapani Upanishad (as Krishna's other consort), in the Garga Samhita (as Queen of Dvaraka), in Bhagavata Purana (as Krishna's chief queen), in Brahma Vaivarta Purana, in Harivaṃśa that centres upon Dvaraka, and in Mahabharata, mainly in the Adi Parva and the Mausala Parva. Rukmini is the central character of the text, Rukminisha Vijaya, that talks about her and Krishna's life before marriage and ends with their marriage. She also appears in the Vishnu Purana and Padma Purana (as an avatar of Lakshmi).

The Brihad Bhagavatamrita offers the following adulations to Rukmini, identifying her with Lakshmi and Krishna as the Supreme God, the source of all avatars. It states that she assumes partial avatars to accompany Krishna's avatars like Vamana and serves Krishna as his "perfectly complete divine consort". The Narada Purana instructs a devotee on the manner of offering worship to Krishna, offering precedence to the role of Rukmini in his devotion. Rukmini is worshipped with Krishna on his left-hand side; she is equated with Rajas. The Skanda Purana describes the process of the worship of the goddess with Krishna. A devotee is said to acquire wish fulfillment, male progeny and physical beauty by pleasing Rukmini. According to texts such as the Rudrayāmala Tantra, Rukmiṇī is a Mahāvidyā.

== Worship and festivals ==
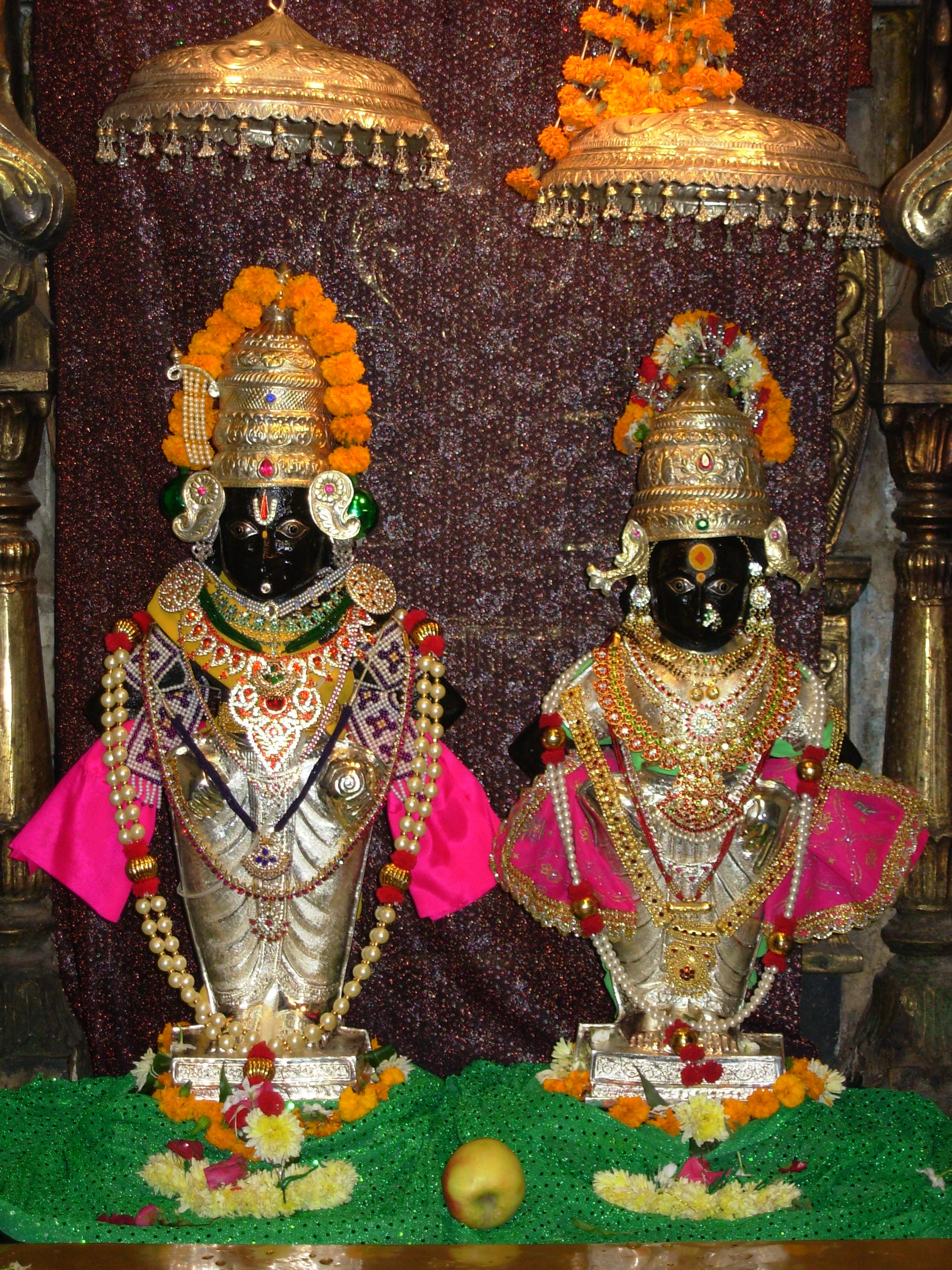
Vithoba (left) with his consort Rakhumai at the Sion Vitthal temple, Mumbai

Rukmini's worship as the consort of Krishna precedes his association with his other consorts Satyabhama. According to D.C. Sircar, a sculpture from Paharpur in northern Bengal, attributed to the sixth or seventh century, represents Krishna and his consort, which he concludes is likely Rukmini. Her identification with Radha is rendered unlikely by the historian, since, "we have no undoubted reference to Radha in genuine epigraphic or literary records of an early date".

Rukmini is mainly worshipped in west and south Indian states such as Gujarat, Maharashtra, Karnataka, Goa, Andhra Pradesh, Telangana, Tamil Nadu, and Kerala. Her kingdom, Vidarbha, is believed to be located in present-day Maharashtra. Along with Vithoba (a regional form of Krishna), Rukmini is worshipped as "Rakhumai" in the Pandharpur region. Rukmini is worshipped as the chief goddess in Divya Desam temples like Pandava Thoothar Perumal Temple, Parthasarathy Temple; with Krishna being the primary deity. She is also worshipped with her co-wife Satyabhama in temples like Thirukkavalampadi, Venugopalaswamy Temple and Rajagopalaswamy Temple.

=== Festivals ===
==== Rukmini Ashtami ====
Rukmini Ashtami is the occasion that celebrates the birth anniversary of Rukmini. It is observed on the eighth day of the waning moon in the Hindu lunar month of Pausha (December—January on the Common Era calendar). Rukmini is acknowledged with special pujas and rituals in all of the temples dedicated to Krishna, especially those in those parts of India, especially associated with him such as Mathura and Vrindavan.

==== Vasanthotsavam ====
Vasanthotsavam is an annual Seva celebrated in Tirumala to celebrate the arrival of spring season. Abhishekam - specifically called Snapana Thirumanjanam (Holy bathing), is performed to the utsava murthy and his consorts on all the three days. On the third day, abhishekam is performed to the idols of Rama, Sita, Lakshmana and Hanumana along with Krishna and Rukmini. Procession of the consecrated idols are taken in a procession in the evening on all the three days.

== Temples ==
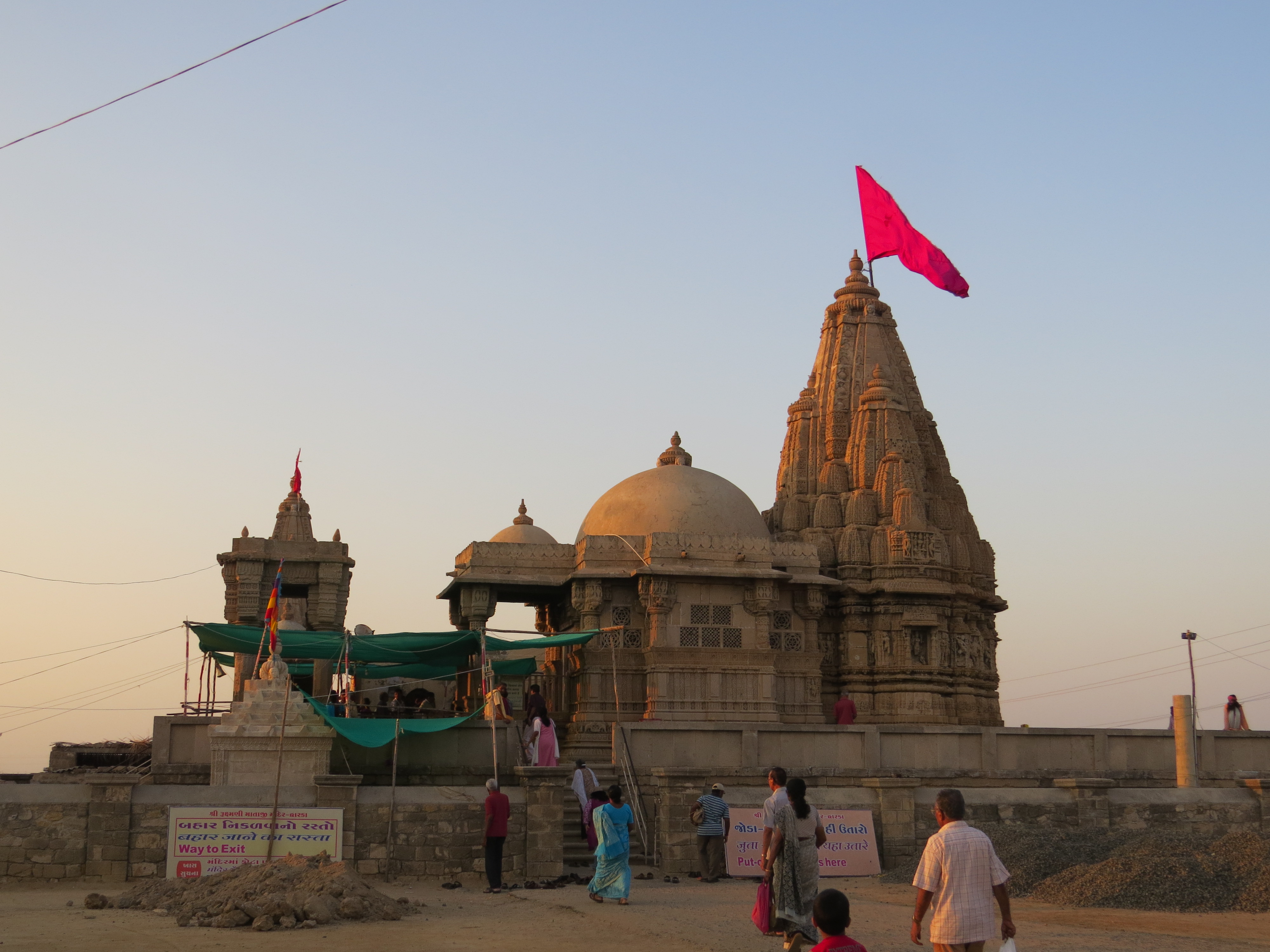
Rukmini Devi Temple, Dwaraka

- Rukmini Devi Temple, Dwaraka, Gujarat.
- Kantajew Temple, Bangladesh
- Vitthal Rukhmini Temple, Kaundanyapur, Maharashtra
- Tirumala Venkateswara Temple, Tirupati, Andhra Pradesh.
- Vithoba Temple, Pandharpur, Maharashtra.
- Pandava Thoothar Perumal Temple, Kanchipuram, Tamil Nadu.
- Thennangur Sri Rakhumai Sametha Panduranga Temple, Thiruvannamalai, Tamil Nadu.
- Sri Vittal Rakhumai Mandir, Dahisar, Maharashtra.
- Shri Vitthal Rukmini Temple, Thanjavur, Tamil Nadu.
- Sri Rukmini Panduranga Swamy Temple, Machilipatnam, Andhra Pradesh.
- Vijaya Vitthala Mandhira, Hampi, Karnataka.
- ISKCON Temple - Iskcon Kaundanyapur, Iskcon Los Angeles, Iskcon Amravati, Iskcon Dwarka.
- Kantajew Temple, Dinajpur, Bangladesh.
- Sri Krishnan Temple, Singapore.
- Lakhubai Mandir Temple Dindiravan, Pandharpur, India
- Vitthal Rukmini Mandir, New Jersey USA
- Rukmini Panduranga Temple, Long Beach, CA
- Rukmini Mata Mandir Paliwal Dham Pali
- Jagdish Temple, Udaipur
- Swaminarayan Mandir, Vadtal

== Influence ==
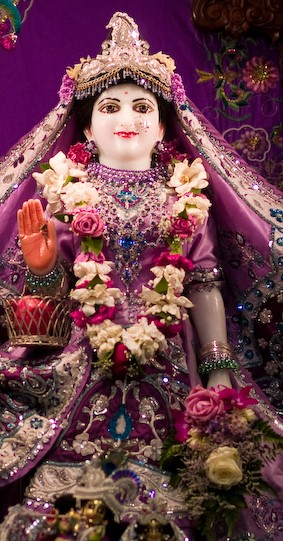
Rukmini at the New Dwarka Hare Krishna temple, Los Angeles

=== Culture ===
The Mishmi people of Arunachal Pradesh believe that Rukmini belonged to their tribe. The plays and dances on 'Rukmini Haran' are common. There is a legend that Krishna asked the Mishmi people to cut their hair as a form of punishment for not allowing him to marry Rukmini. Due to this Idu-Mishmi people are also called "chulikata" (chuli-hair, kata- cut).

=== Paintings ===
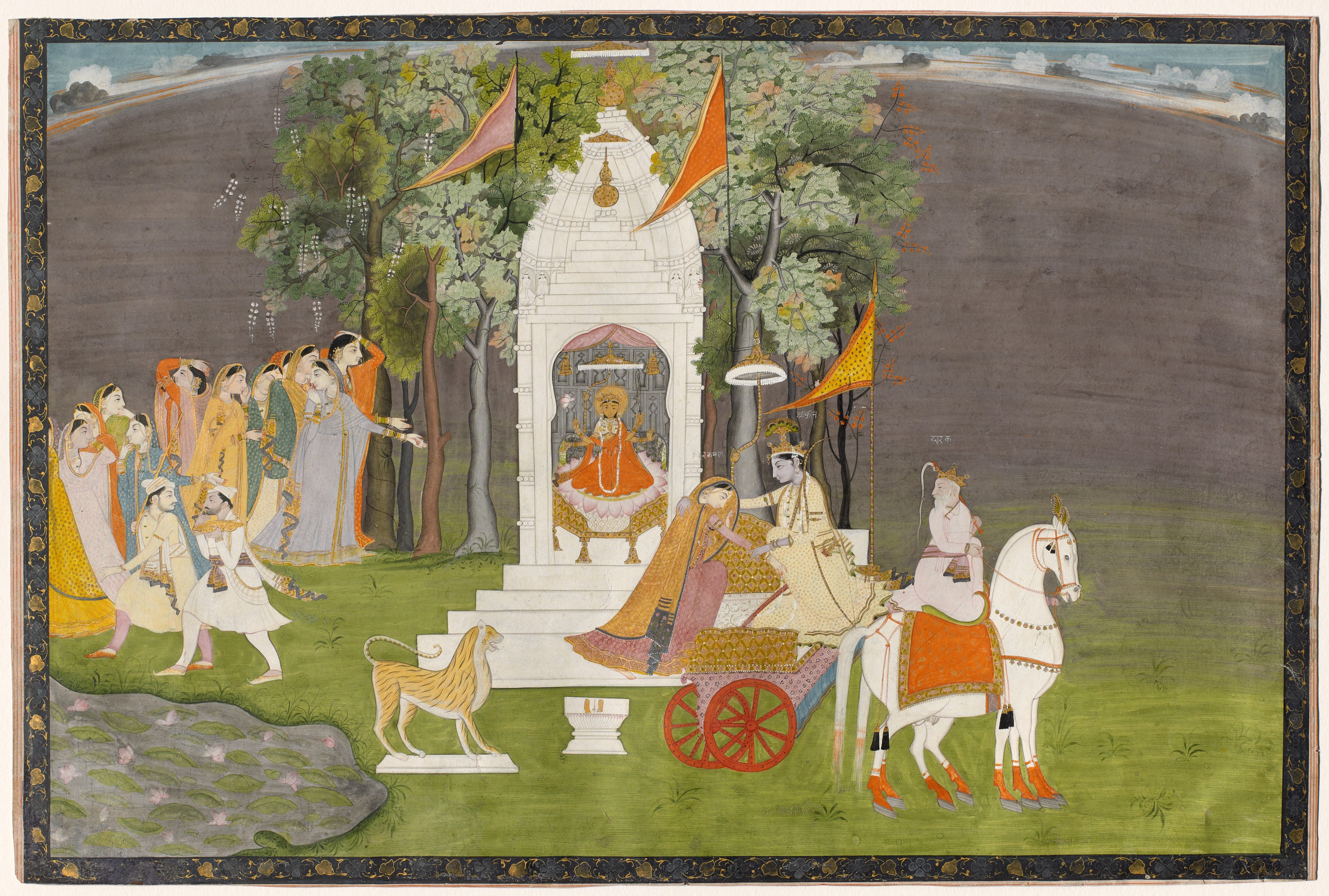
Krishna abducting Rukmini - Museum of Fine Arts

Rukmini's marriage to Krishna and related events have been depicted in the Kangra painting and Mandi painting.

=== In popular culture ===
==== Films ====
- In the 1957 Telugu-Tamil film Mayabazar, Rukmini was portrayed by Sandhya.
- In the 1966 Telugu film Sri Krishna Tulabharam, Rukmini was portrayed by Anjali Devi.
- In the 1967 and 1971 Telugu films Sri Krishnavataram and Sri Krishna Vijayamu respectively, Rukmini was portrayed by Devika.
- In 1971 Kannada film Sri Krishna Rukmini Satyabhama, Rukmini was portrayed by Saroja Devi.
- In the 1986 Hindi film Krishna-Krishna, Rukmini was portrayed by Vidya Sinha.
- in the 2026 Film Krishnavataram Part 1: The Heart (Hridayam), Rukmini is played by Nivaashiyni Krishnan.

==== Television ====
- In B. R. Chopra's 1988 series Mahabharat, Rukmini was portrayed by Channa Ruparel.
- In Ramanand Sagar's 1993 series Shri Krishna, Rukmini was portrayed by Pinky Parikh.
- In the 2011 series Dwarkadheesh Bhagwan Shree Krishn, Rukmini was portrayed by Priya Bathija and Payal Shrivastav.
- In the 2013 series Mahabharat, Rukmini was portrayed by Pallavi Subhash.
- In the 2017 series Vithu Mauli, Rukmini was portrayed by Ekta Labde.
- In the 2017 series Paramavatar Shri Krishna, Rukmini was portrayed by Amandeep Sidhu and Hunar Hali.
- In the 2018 series RadhaKrishn, Rukmini was portrayed by Zalak Desai.
- In the 2019 series Dwarkadheesh Bhagwan Shree Krishn – Sarvkala Sampann, Rukmini was portrayed by Neetha Shetty.

== See also ==
- Ashtabharya
- Rakhumai
- Krishna

== Bibliography ==
- Rajachudamani Dikshita; English introduction, P.P. Subramanya Sastry (1920). Rukmini Kalyanam (Sanskrit). Sri Vani Vilas Press, Srirangam.
- Iyer, Saiswaroopadate (2021). Rukmini — Krishna's Wife. Rupa. ISBN 9789390356089.
