= Nagalakshmi =

Consort of Shesha in Hinduism

- Queen of the Serpents
- Anathankavu Nagalakshmi Temple
- Affiliation: Vaishnavism, Lakshmi, Devi , Kshira Sagara
- Abode: Vaikuntha
- Texts: Garga Samhita

Genealogy
- Spouse: Shesha

Nagalakshmi (Sanskrit: नागलक्ष्मी, romanized: nāgalakṣmī) is a serpent goddess and the wife of Shesha, a nagaraja (king of the serpents) and one of the two mounts of Vishnu featured in Hindu mythology. She is considered to be the personification of the divine ocean called the Kshira Sagara.

== Legend ==
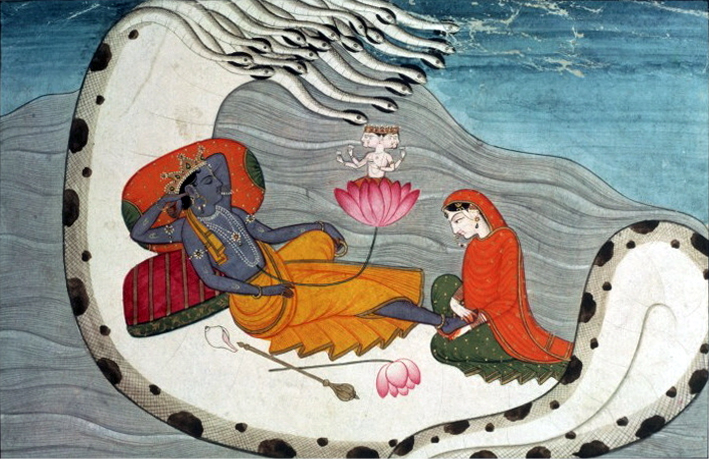
Vishnu and Lakshmi on Shesha over the Kshira Sagara

Nagalakshmi's legend is mainly found in the Garga Samhita. In this, the Kshira Sagara is personified as her. In Chapter 3 of the Balabhadra Khanda of the Garga Samhita, it is mentioned that she incarnated on earth along with her husband.

The Kshira Sagara is the fifth from the centre of the seven oceans. It surrounds the continent known as Krauncha. According to Hindu scriptures, the devas and asuras worked together for a millennium to churn this ocean in order to acquire amrita, the elixir of immortal life. It is described as the place where the deity Vishnu reclines over his serpent-mount Shesha, accompanied by his consort, Lakshmi.

== Incarnations ==
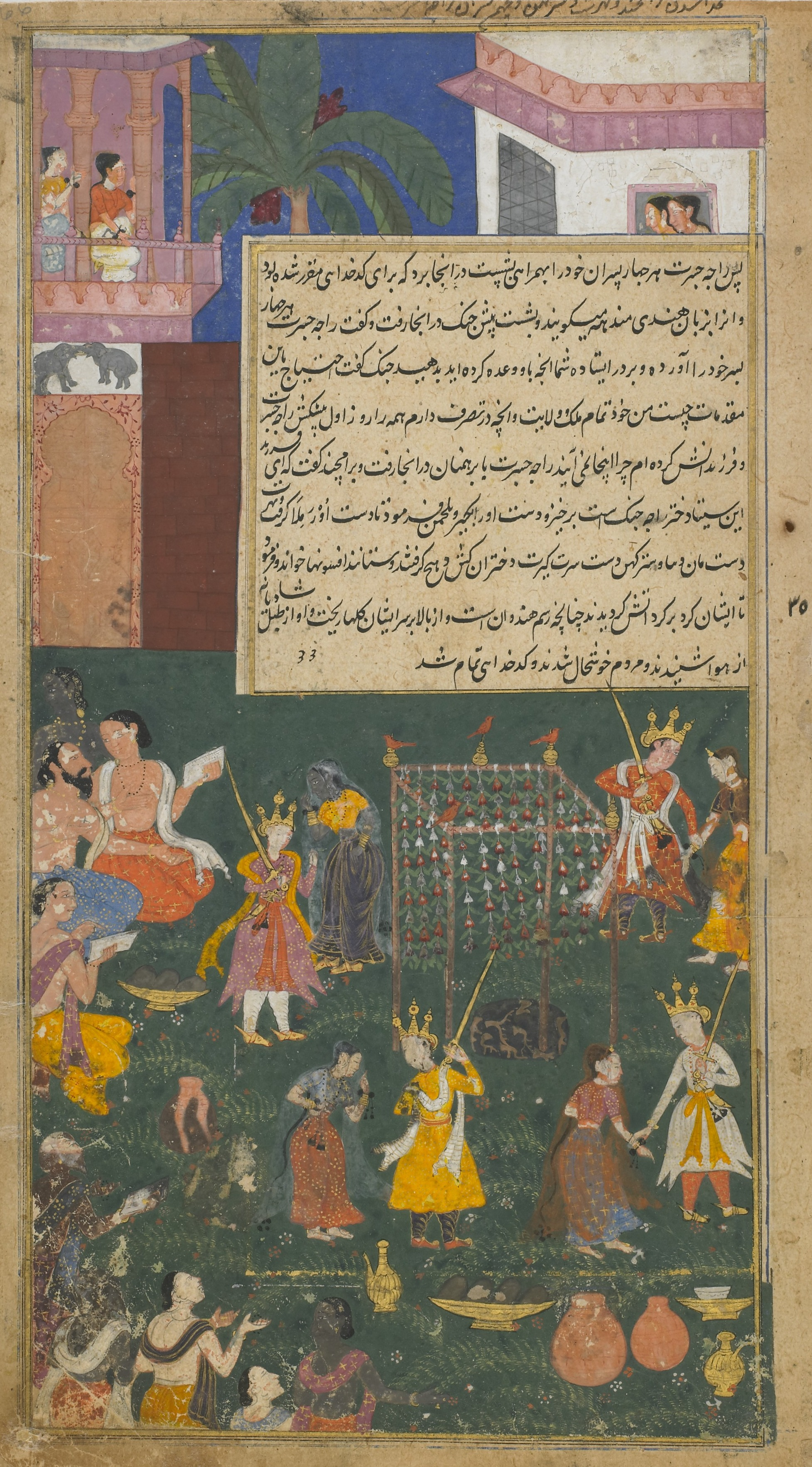
The wedding ceremony of Urmila and Lakshmana

In the Treta Yuga, she incarnated as Urmila, the wife of Lakshmana. She was born as the daughter of King Janaka of Mithila and Queen Sunayana. She played a prominent role in the Hindu epic Ramayana. When Shesha's avatar Lakshmana went to exile with Rama (Vishnu's avatar), Urmila slept continuously for fourteen years so that her husband could serve his brother without requiring sleep, an episode known as ""Urmila Nidra".

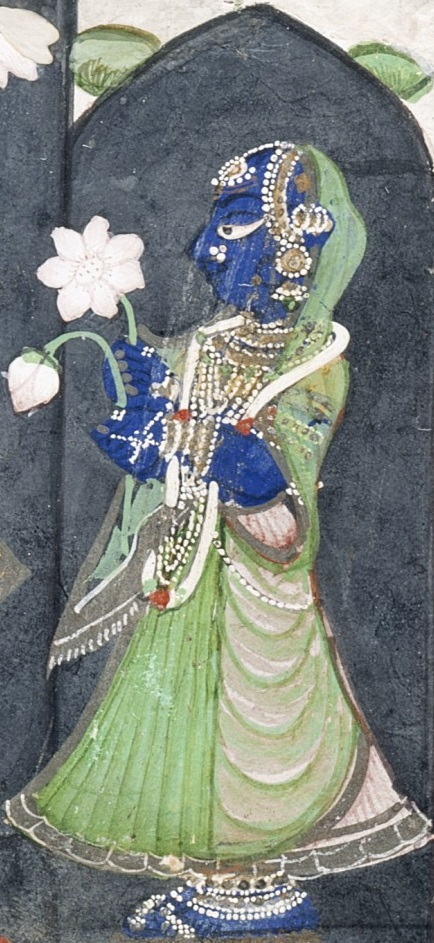
A portrait of Revati

In the Dvapara Yuga, she was born as Revati, the wife of Balarama and the daughter of King Kakudmi of Kushasthali. However, in traditions where Balarama is identified with Vishnu, Revati is regarded to be a form of Lakshmi.

== Literature ==
In the Garga Samhita, the sage Pradipika recounts the attributes of Nagalakshmi:

Following this, the radiant Nagalakshmi, glowing with the brilliance of countless autumn moons, arrived on a magnificent chariot, accompanied by millions of her companions whose radiance was ever-increasing. She approached the great Sankarshana and expressed her desire, Lord, I also wish to accompany you on Earth. The thought of being separated from you would afflict me so deeply that I wouldn't be able to bear it. Nagalakshmi was overwhelmed with emotion.

Lord Ananta (Shesha), who is the ultimate cause behind all causes in the entire universe, whose very nature is to alleviate the sorrows of devotees, and whose divine form resembles the great serpent Airavata, comforted his beloved. He said, O Rambhoru! Do not grieve. Descend to Earth and merge with the body of Revati. There, you will serve me.

Upon hearing this, Nagalakshmi inquired, Who is Revati? Whose daughter is she, and where does she reside? Please tell me in detail. Hearing this, Lord Ananta, with a smile, explained, It is the story of the beginning of creation. I, born as the son of the sage Kashyapa from Kadru's womb, took a formidable form.

— Garga Samhita, Chapter 3

== Worship ==
The Ananthankavu Nagalakshmi Temple, located in Thiruvananthapuram, Kerala, is known for its environmental sensitivity and association with snakes. It stands as the sole sacred grove (surppakavu) housing ancient 1000-year-old idols of Nagalakshmi and Nagaraja Ananthan.

== Beyond the Indian subcontinent and Hinduism ==
In the snake worship traditions of Tai folk religion and animism in Thailand, she is known as Usa Ananwati (พระนางอุษาอนันตวดี) and is regarded as the spouse of Shesha. She is regularly honored in local worship ceremonies.

Among the Nagini in Thai snake worship, she is the second most revered figure, following Lady Sri Pathumma Nagini (ย่าศรีปทุมมา), the wife of Shri Sutho Naga (ปู่ศรีสุทโธ) of Kham Chanod Forest in Ban Dung district, Udon Thani province, Isan, Thailand. Kham Chanod is considered the spiritual center of snake worship in Thai folk beliefs.

Numerous shrines across Thailand are dedicated to her as a guardian deity, with one of the most notable being Wat Tham Dao Khao Kaeo (วัดถ้ำดาวเขาแก้ว) in Lam Phaya Klang subdistrict, Muak Lek district, Saraburi province., Wat Laem Maklue (วัดแหลมมะเกลือ), Sam Ngaam Subdistrict, Don Tum District, Nakhon Pathom Province., Wat Thum Wang Pha Phaya Nakaraj (วัดถ้ำวังผาพญานาคราช), Huai Phai Subdistrict, Khong Chiam District, Ubon Ratchathani Province., Wat Phang Muang (วัดพังม่วง), Si Prachan Subdistrict, Si Prachan District, Suphan Buri., Wat Pa Phu Chan Hom (วัดป่าภูจันทร์หอม), Ban Non Muang Wan, Kham Lo Subdistrict, Chai Wan District, Udon Thani Province.
