= Shesha =

Serpent-king in Hinduism

- King of the Serpents
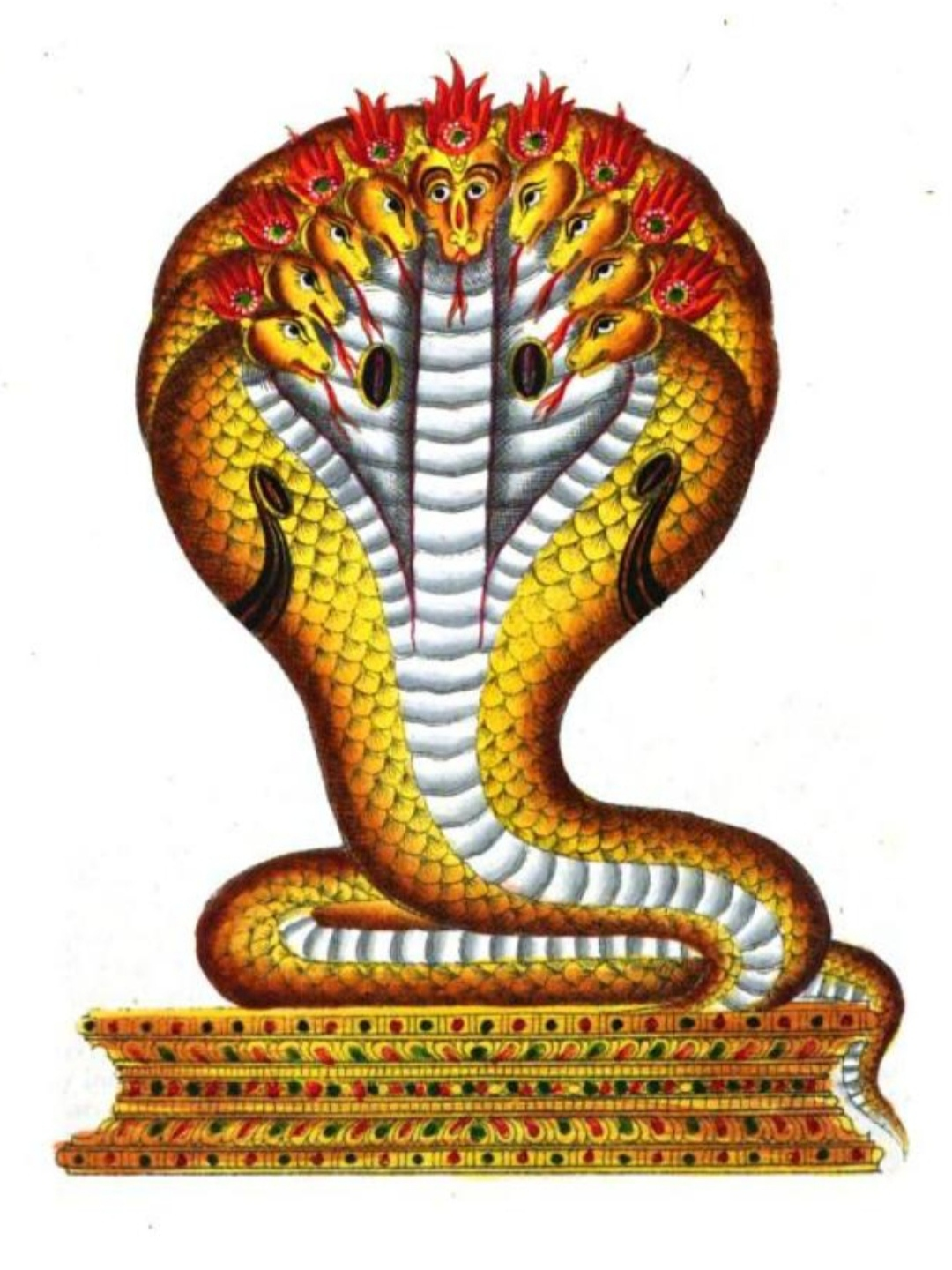
- 19th century depiction of Shesha from the British Raj
- Other names: Sheshanaga, Adishesha, Anantashesha
- Affiliation: Vaishnavism; Nāga
- Abode: Vaikuntha; Kshira Sagara; Patala
- Mantra: om śeṣanāgāya vidmahe anantāya ca dhīmahi tanno nāgaḥ pracodayāt

Genealogy
- Parents: Kashyapa (father); Kadru (mother)
- Siblings: All Nāgas, including Manasa, Vasuki, and Takshaka
- Consort: Nagalakshmi
- Children: Sulochana

Shesha (Sanskrit: शेष, romanised: Śeṣa, lit. 'Remainder'), also called Sheshanaga, Adishesha, and Ananta, is a nagaraja (serpent-king) in Hinduism. Alongside Garuda, he is described as a vahana (mount) of Vishnu, upon whom the deity reclines in the Ocean of Milk with his consort, Lakshmi.

According to Vaishnava tradition, Shesha incarnates on Earth to accompany Vishnu in his avatars, as Lakshmana, the brother of Rama, and as Balarama, the brother of Krishna.

== Etymology ==
Shesha is derived from the Sanskrit root śiṣ, “to remain,” referring to how he is described to remain after the mahapralaya, the dissolution of the universe at the end of each kalpa (cosmic cycle).

== Form ==
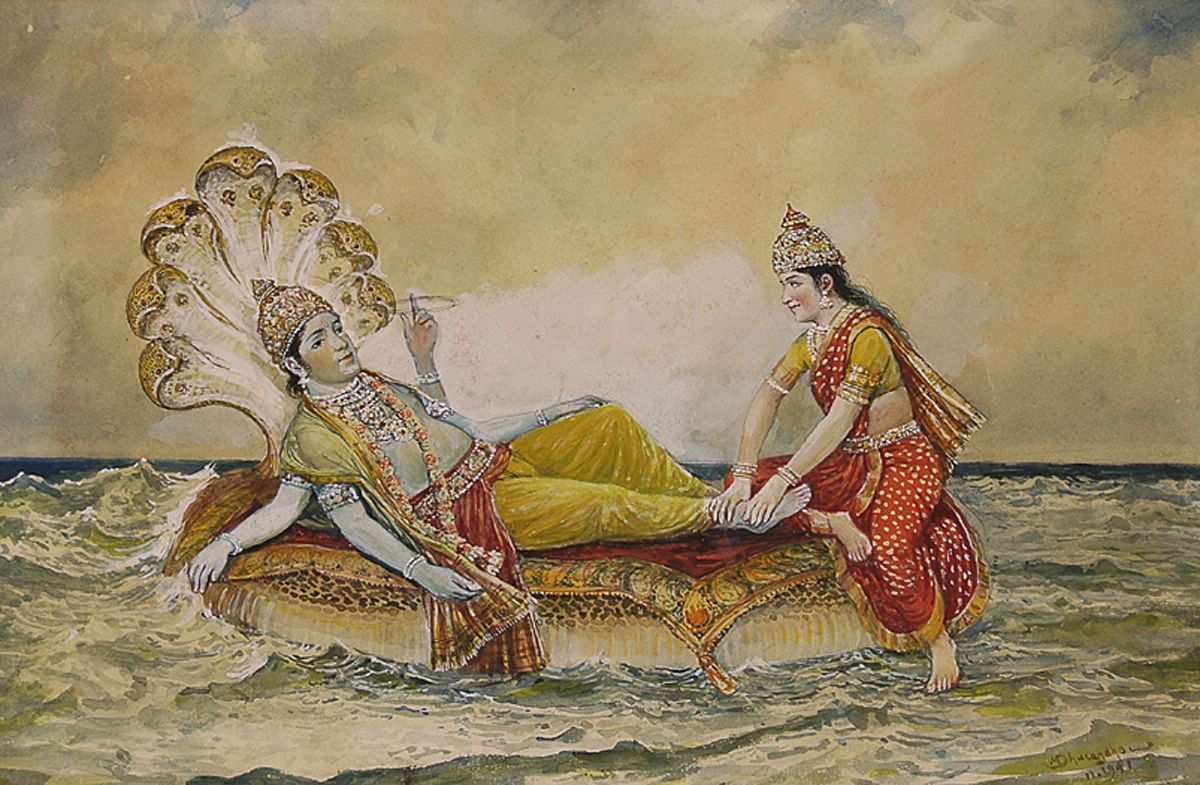
Narayana resting on Shesha, accompanied by Lakshmi.

Shesha is generally depicted with a large coiled form floating through cosmic space or upon the Ocean of Milk, forming the bed upon which Vishnu rests. In iconography, he is depicted with multiple hoods—often five, seven or ten—though classical texts frequently describe him with one thousand crowned heads.

== Origin and legends ==
According to the Mahabharata, Shesha was the eldest of the one thousand serpents born to the sage Kashyapa and his wife Kadru. He was followed by Vasuki, Iravati and Takshaka. Many of his serpent siblings were described as cruel and were prone to inflicting harm on others. They were hostile toward Garuda, Kashyapa's son by Vinata; both Kadru and Vinata were daughters of Daksha.

Distressed by the cruel conduct of his siblings, Shesha abandoned his kin, and undertook austere penances. He subsisted on air while meditating at sites such as Gandhamadana, Badarikashrama, Gokarna, Pushkara, and the Himalayas. Pleased by his severe penance and resolve, Brahma appeared and offered him a boon. Shesha requested that his mind remain steadfast in dharma (righteousness) and bhakti (devotion), which Brahma granted. Brahma then asked Shesha to stabilize the Earth by descending beneath it. Shesha entered the subterranean realm (Pātāla) and supported Bhūmi (Earth) upon his hood. He is traditionally believed to support her even today, thus making Patala his perennial residence.

=== Vishnu and Shesha ===
Shesha is usually depicted as floating upon the cosmic ocean—the resting place of Vishnu in his primordial forms such as Narayana, Vāsudeva or Mahavishnu.

In the Bhagavata Purana, Shesha is referred as Samkarshana, associated with the tamasic energy of Narayana, dwelling in the lower regions of Patala. Samkarshana is also one of the four vyuhas (theological emanations) of Vishnu alongside Vasudeva, Pradyumna, and Aniruddha.

In Gaudiya Vaishnavism, Samkarshana is regarded an aspect of Vishnu who emanates as Garbhodakshayi—Vishnu at the beginning of the universe to create Brahma.

The Puranas state that Samkarshana imparted the Bhagavata teachings to the Four Kumaras, through whom the knowledge was passed on to the sage Maitreya and subsequently to Vidura.

=== Marriage ===
According to tradition, Shesha is married to Nagalakshmi. The Garga Samhita describes her as a personification of the Kshira Sagara (Ocean of Milk).

== Avatars ==
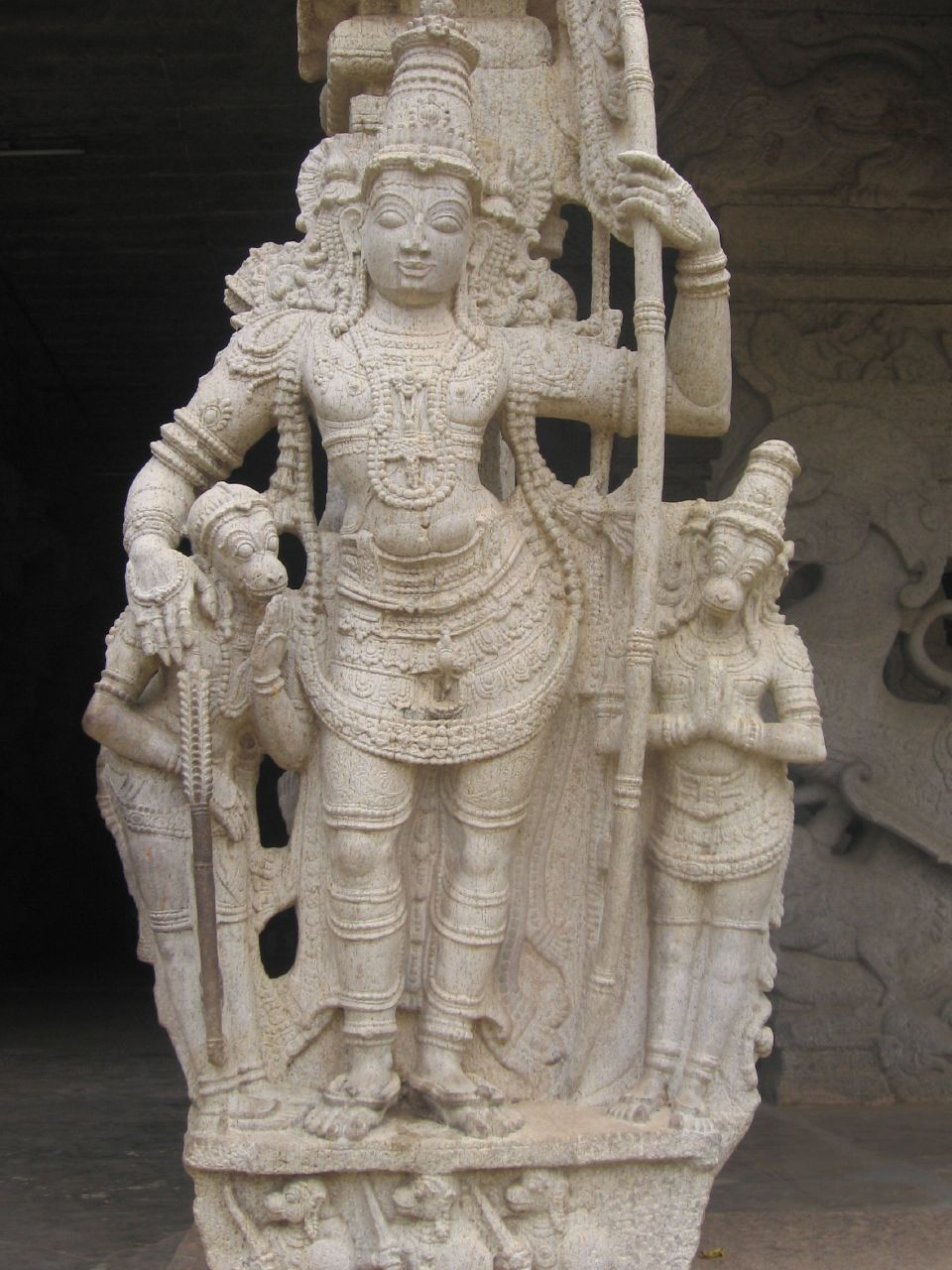
As Lakshmana, Shesha accompanied Vishnu in his Rama avatar.

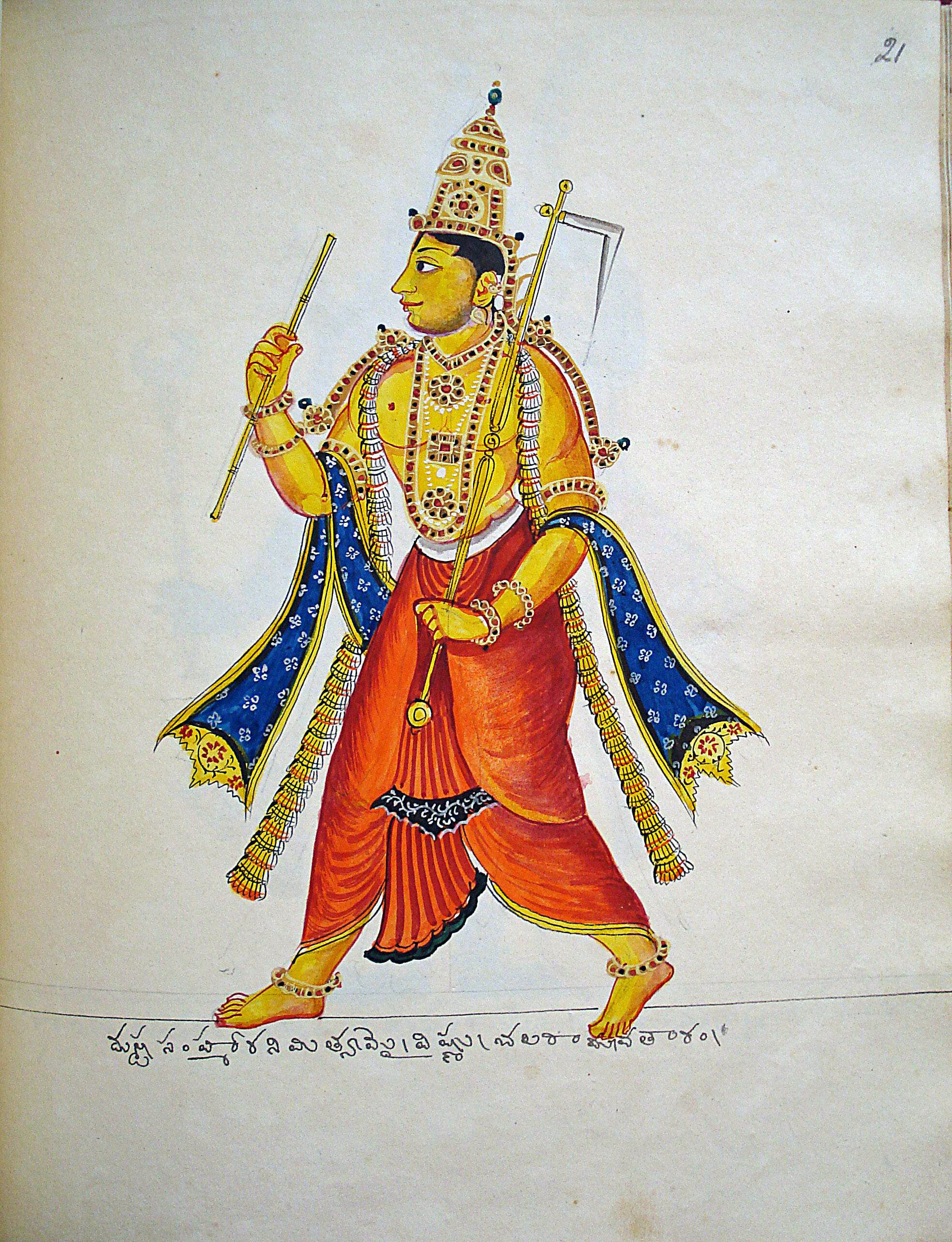
As Balarama, Shesha accompanied Vishnu in his Krishna avatar.

In Sri Vaishnava tradition, Shesha is believed to have taken six incarnations on earth. During the Satya Yuga, he is described as appearing in his primordial form to provide a seat for Vishnu's avatar Narasimha following the defeat of demon-king Hiranyakashipu.

During the Treta Yuga, Shesha was born as Lakshmana, the younger brother of Vishnu's avatar Rama in the Ramayana. His consort, Nagalakshmi, is traditionally described to be born as Urmila, Sita's sister.

During Dvapara Yuga, he is described as incarnating as Balarama, the elder brother of Krishna. This is often disputed by the original line-ups of the Dasavatara, where Balarama is considered to be an incarnation of Vishnu. His consort was born as Revati, the daughter of King Kakudmi.

In Sri Vaishnava tradition, Shesha manifested during the Kali Yuga as the grammarian Patanjali and Ramanuja to teach philosophy and devotion.

In Gaudiya Vaishnavism, Shesha is believed to have incarnated as Nityananda, the companion of Chaitanya Mahaprabhu, who is regarded in that tradition as an avatar of Krishna.

== Literature ==
The Brahma Purana describes the attributes of Ananta:

Daityas and Dānavas are not capable of recounting his good qualities. He is honoured by Devas and celestial sages. He is spoken of as Ananta. He has a thousand hoods, and he is clearly bedecked in Svastika ornaments devoid of impurities. He illuminates all quarters by thousand jewels on his hoods.

For the welfare of the universe, he deprives the Asuras of their prowess. His eyes whirl and rove due to intoxication. He has only one earring at all times.

Wearing a crown and garlands he shines like a white mountain aflame with fire.

He is clad in blue garments. He is intoxicated with pride. He is resplendent with white garlands. He is lofty like the mountain of Kailāsa where the celestial Gaṅgā falls. He has placed his hand on the plough-share; he holds an excellent iron club. He is attended upon by the embodied splendour of Varuṇa.

At the end of the Kalpa, Rudra in the form of Saṅkarṣaṇa comes out of his mouth, blazing like the flame of poisonous fire and devours the three worlds.

He holds the entire sphere of the world rising above like a peak.

— Brahma Purana, Chapter 19

The Brahmanda Purana also described Shesha in Patala:

With his two thousand eyes that have the reddish splendour of the rising sun and with his body that is white and glossy, he appears like the mountain. Kailāsa surrounded by clusters of flames. He has the white complexion like the Moon as well as the Kunda flowers. Hence the cluster of his eyes shines like the cluster of midday suns on the peak of the white Mountain (Śveta Parvata).

He has a huge terrible body. With it (resting) in his reclining pose on his couch, he appears like a thousand-peaked mountain of vast dimensions (resting) over the earth.

This (enormously) huge lord of serpents, himself of great splendour, is being attended upon by extremely wise and noble-souled great serpents of huge physique. He is the king of all serpents. He is Ananta, Śeṣa, of excessive brilliance.

— Brahmanda Purana, Chapter 20

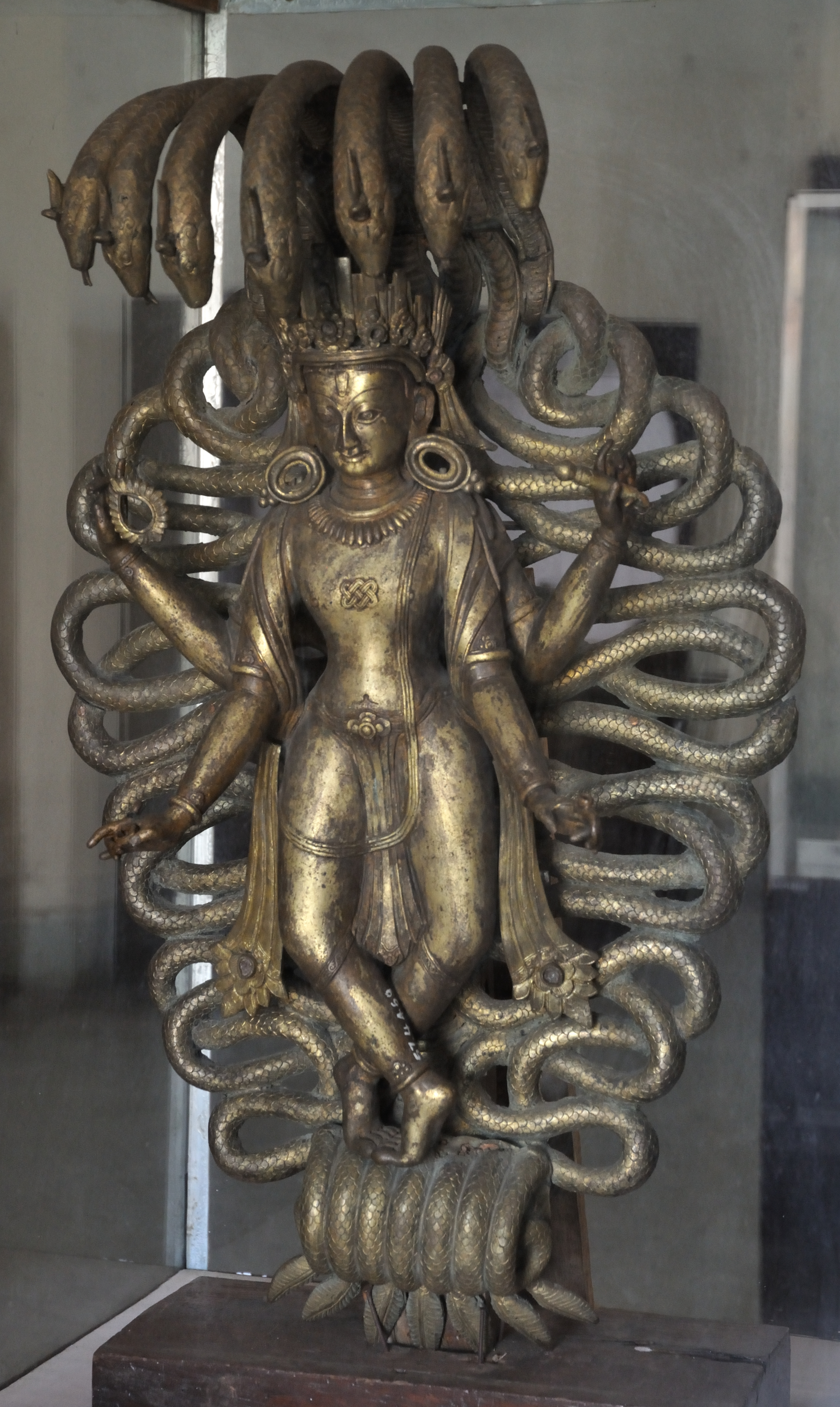
Vishnu with Shesha-ancient Bronze artefact in Government Museum Mathura

The Bhagavata Purana equates Shesha and Balarama:

With intent to do what pleases Sri Hari, the thousand-headed and self-effulgent Lord Ananta (the serpent-god Sesa), a part manifestation of Lord Vasudeva, will precede Him (as His elder brother).

— Bhagavata Purana, 10.1.24

In the Bhagavad Gita, while describing his divine manifestations to Arjuna on the battlefield of Kurukshetra, Krishna states:

अनन्तश्चास्मि नागानां वरुणो यादसामहम्। पितॄणामर्यमा चास्मि यमः संयमतामहम्॥

anantaś cāsmi nāgānāṃ varuṇo yādasām aham | pitṝṇām aryamā cāsmi yamaḥ saṃyamatām aham ||

— Krishna, Bhagavad Gita (Chapter 10, Verse 29)

Krishna states: "Of the many-hooded nāgas, I am Ananta (referring to Shesha), among the aquatics, I am the demigod Varuna. Of the departed ancestors, I am Aryama and among the dispensers of law and justice, I am Yama, the lord of death."

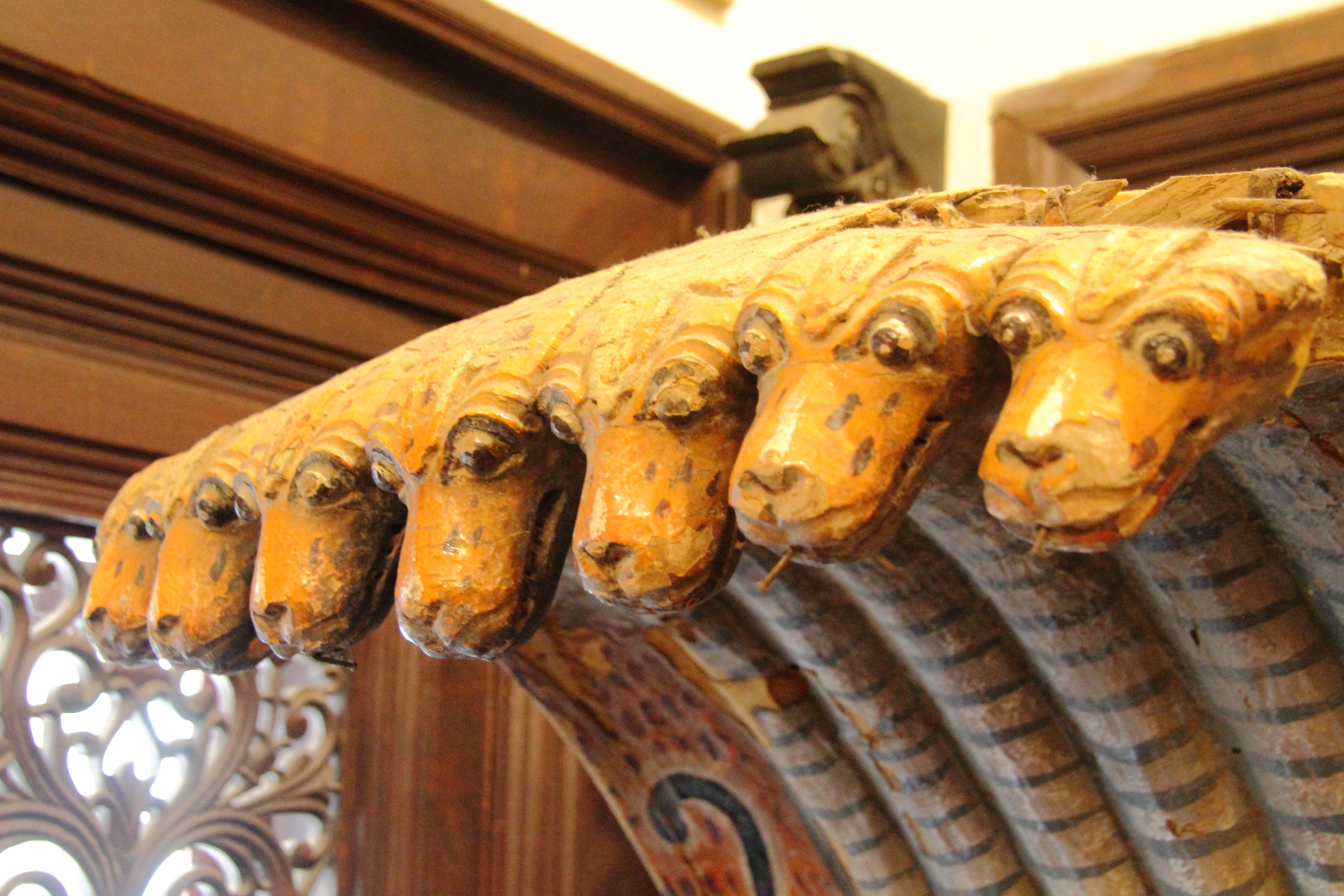
Heads of Shesha at the Kerala Folklore Museum

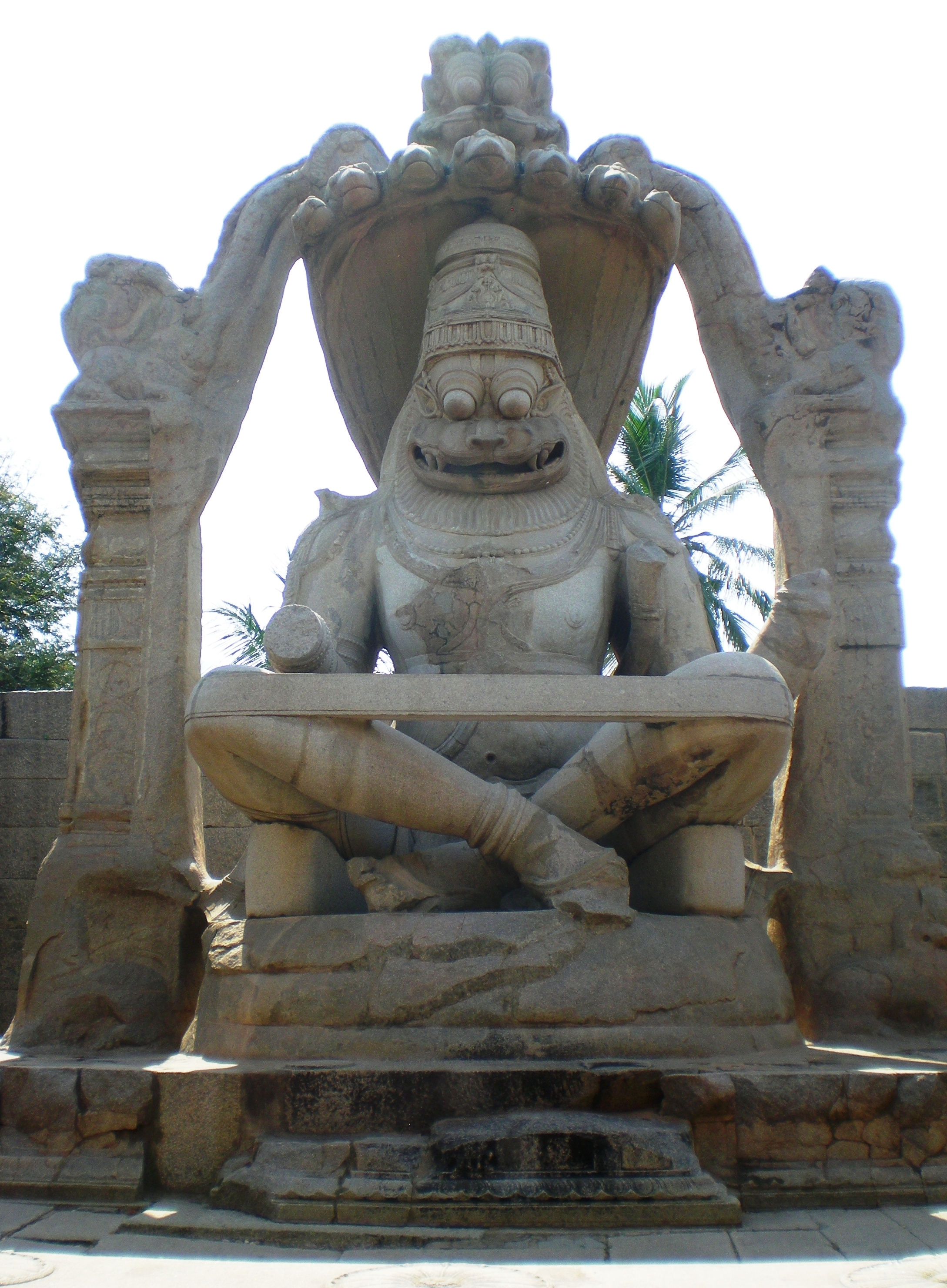
Narasimha, the man-lion incarnation of Vishnu seated on the coils of Shesha, with seven heads of Shesha forming a canopy. Statue at Vijayanagara.

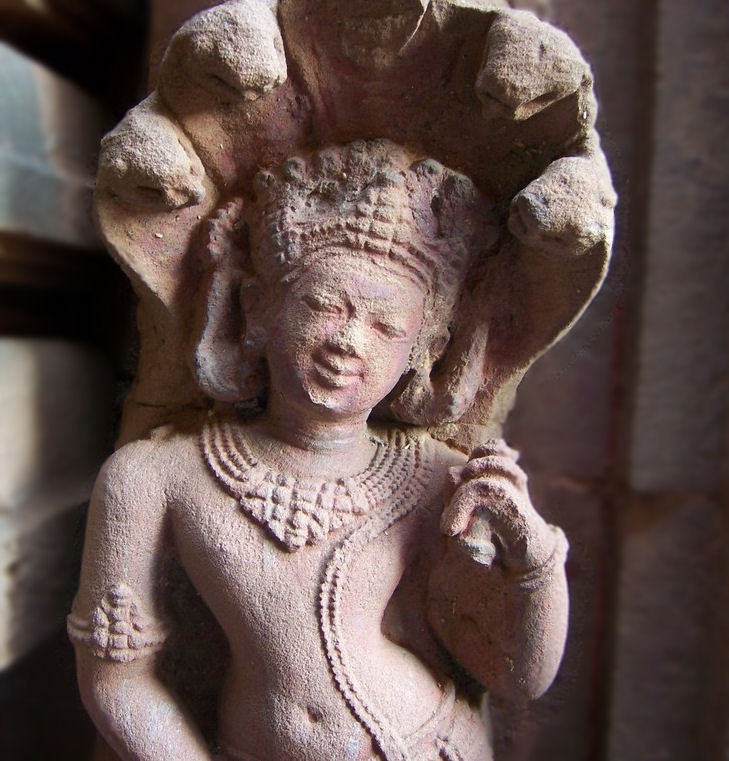
Maha Vishnu sheltered by the five-headed Shesha, Parsurameswar Temple, Bhubaneswar

== In culture ==
The Palliyodam, a type of large snake boat used by Aranmula Parthasarathy Temple in Kerala during the annual Uthrattathi Jalamela and Valla Sadhya festivals, is traditionally said to have been designed by Krishna to resemble Shesha.

== Beyond the Indian subcontinent and Hinduism ==
In the snake-worship traditions of Tai folk religion and animism in Thailand, he is revered as a major naga, second in rank only to Grandfather Shri Sutho Naga (ปู่ศรีสุทโธ) of Kham Chanod Forest in Ban Dung district of Udon Thani province. Kham Chanod is considered the primary spiritual center for serpent worship in regional Thai folk beliefs. He is also represented in the Royal Barge Anantanakkharat, one of the Thailand's principal royal ceremonial vessels.

Several shrine is throughout Thailand, honour in as a guardian deity. Notable sites include a shrine beneath the Second Thai–Lao Friendship Bridge in Mukdahan province, as well as a shrine opposite the Suvarnabhumi Airport Police Station.The latter is one of the four guardian naga shrines situated at cardinal points around Suvarnabhumi Airport in Bang Phli District.

== See also ==
- Jörmungandr
- Manasa
- Nāga
- Nagaradhane
- Ouroboros
- Padmanabhaswamy Temple
- Snake worship
- Vasuki

== Bibliography ==
- Handa, Om Chanda (2004), Naga Cults and Traditions in the Western Himalaya, Indus Publishing, ISBN 978-8173871610
