= Sandipani =

Guru of the Hindu god Krishna

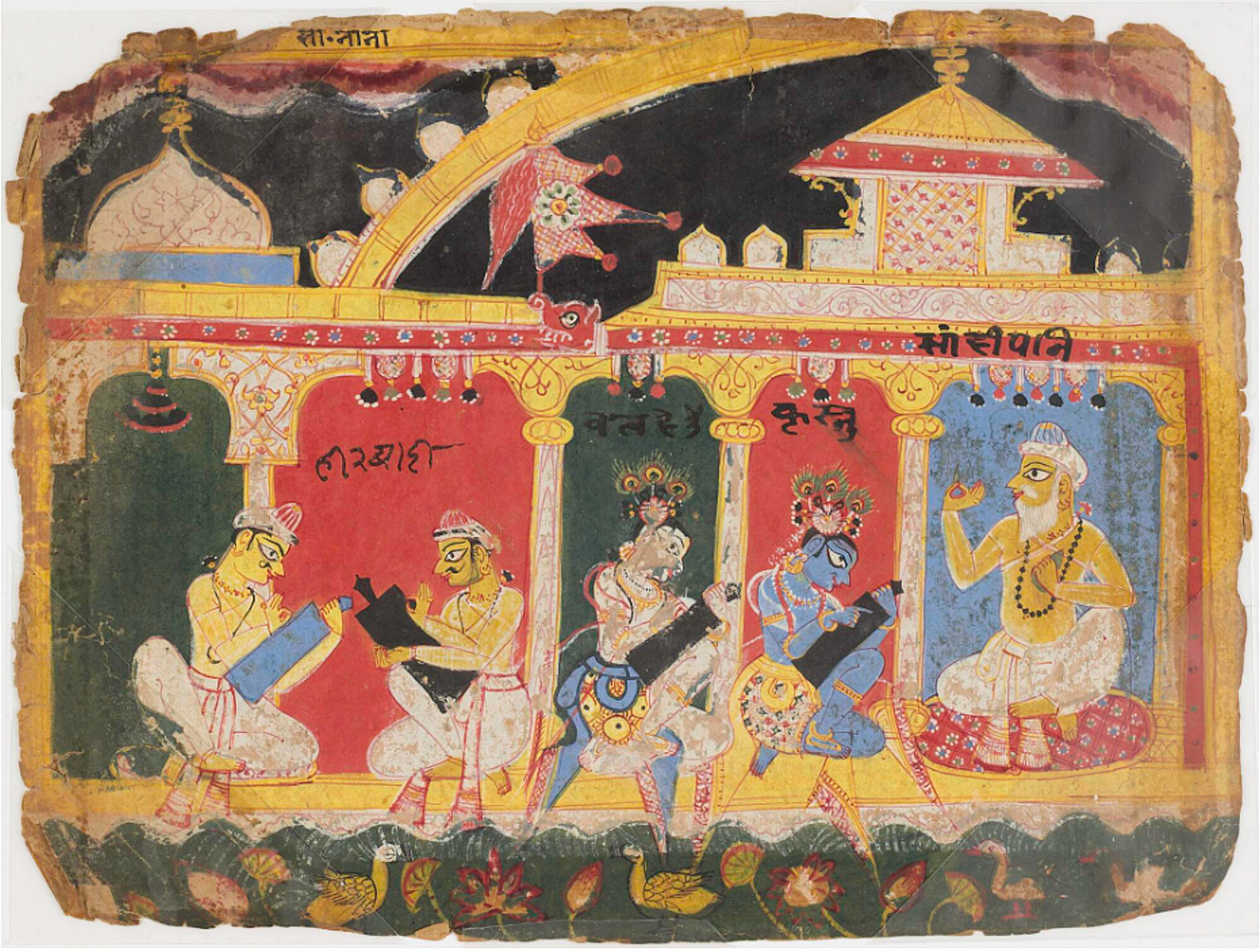
- Krishna and Balarama Studying with the Brahman Sandipani (Bhagavata Purana, 1525-1550 CE print). Krishna in blue is seated next to Balarama, both wearing peacock-feather headdresses, in front of their teacher Sandipani. Two other students appear on the left.
- Texts: Puranas

Information
- Occupation: Guru
- Affiliation: Devotee of Krishna
- Children: Unnamed son
- Home: Avanti Kingdom

Sandipani (Sanskrit: सान्दीपनि, romanized: Sāndīpani), sometimes rendered Sāndīpana, is the guru of Krishna and Balarama in Hinduism. He is said to have educated them regarding all the Vedas, the art of drawing, astronomy, Gandharva veda, medicine, training elephants and horses, and archery.

== Legend ==
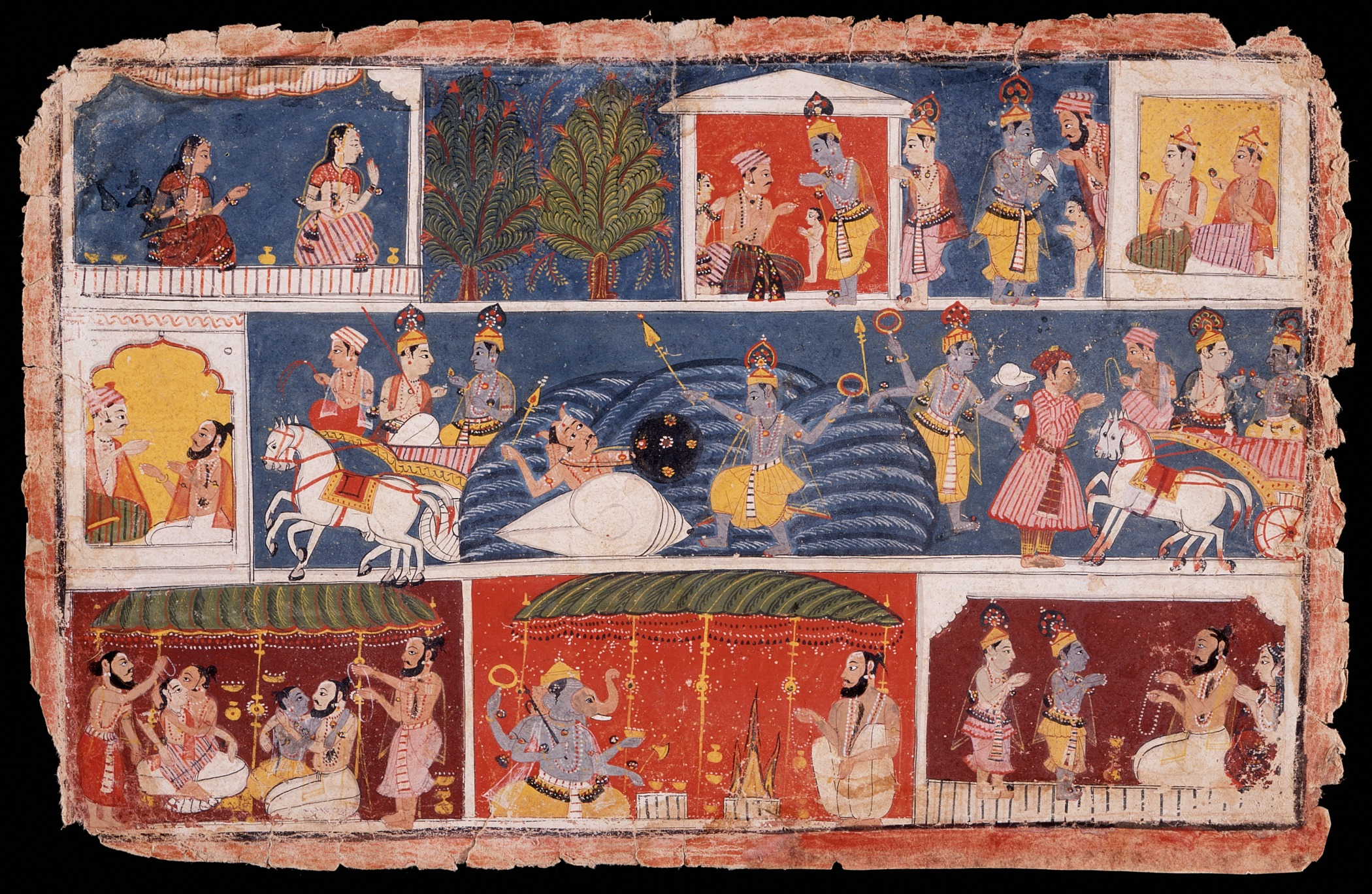
Krishna Receives the Sacred Thread and Returns his Preceptor Sandipani's Son, Folio from a Bhagavata Purana (Ancient Stories of the Lord). India, Madhya Pradesh, Malwa, circa 1640

The Bhagavata Purana relates the following story regarding Sandipani: While staying as students at the residence of Sandipani, the brothers Krishna and Balarama, and their friend, Sudama, mastered every single lesson, although only having been instructed once in each. Upon the rapid completion of their studies, they persuaded their teacher to ask for a gurudakshina (a type of honorarium to one's guru) of his own choosing. Sandipani asked for the restoration of his child, who had disappeared in the ocean at Prabhasa. The two brothers travelled to Prabhasa and found that the son had been snatched away by a being named Śaṅkhāsura (lit. 'conch demon'). Krishna rescued his son and they returned him to their preceptor.

In the Harivamsa Purana, Krishna learnt that Sandipani's son has been swallowed by an asura called Panchajana, and had perished. Krishna and his brother travelled to Yamaloka to persuade Yama to restore his preceptor's son back to life, and succeeded:

He then brought from Yama’s abode his preceptor’s son lost for a long time. By the power of Krishna of peerless energy Sandipani’s son, dead long ago, returned in his bodily form. Beholding this highly wonderful feat which cannot be thought of or performed by any all the creatures were filled with surprise. Taking his preceptor’s son, Pancajanya and diverse precious jewels, Madhava, the Lord of the universe, returned.

— Harivamsa, Book 2, Chapter 33
