= Revati =

Consort of Hindu god Balarama

- Goddess of Opulence
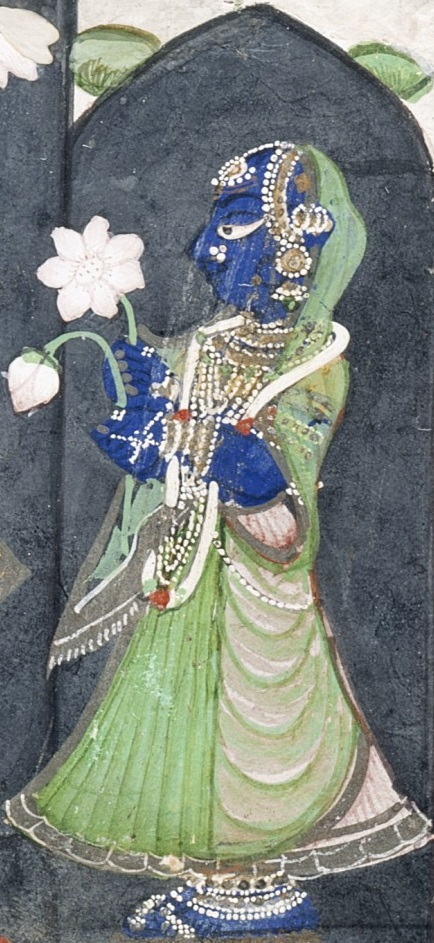
- Affiliation: Vaishnavism Nagalakshmi. Devi
- Abode: Vaikuntha

Genealogy
- Parents: Kakudmi (father)
- Consort: Balarama
- Children: Nishatha; Ulmuka (sons)

Revati (Sanskrit: रेवती, romanized: Revatī) is a goddess featured in Hindu scriptures. She is King Kakudmi's daughter and Krishna's elder brother Balarama's consort, and one of the Dashavatara. Her account is given within a number of Hindu texts such as the Mahabharata and the Bhagavata Purana.She is also considered an avatar of Goddess Nagalakshmi .

== Origin ==
Revati has her origins as a mother goddess who was capable of great destruction. When Dirghajihvi, a demon, threatened to attack the devas, the gods sought the assistance of Skanda, who in turn requested Revati to fight the former. Taking the form of the vixen Shalavriki, Revati wrought havoc in the demon army to the extent that the demons sought refuge in the wombs of human women. In response, the goddess took the Jataharini form and attacked the demons before their conception, cleansing the women of their wickedness. According to the Devi Bhagavata Purana, Revati is associated with Shasthi, an aspect of Prakriti. She was revered as the deity of children who was worshipped by childless couples, offered veneration on the sixth day after a child's birth. Due to her later association with fortune and wealth, Revati was assimilated as a form of Lakshmi, symbolic with her marriage to the avatar of Vishnu, Balarama.

According to the Balabhadra Mahatmya, Revati is considered to be an incarnation of Nagalakshmi, the consort of Shesha.

=== Cultural and mythological significance ===
In Hindu mythology, Revati is associated with Pushan, the deity who protects travelers, herds, and flocks, guiding them safely on their journeys. The nakshatra is symbolized by a fish, reflecting nourishment, movement, and prosperity. Revati marks the end of the lunar mansions and is considered auspicious for beginnings that require endurance and protection. Astronomically, Revati corresponds to the star Zeta Piscium in the constellation Pisces. In Vedic rituals and literature, Revati is linked with fertility, abundance, and safe passage across transitions. Its placement at the final segment of the zodiac symbolizes spiritual completion and the soul’s readiness to move beyond material attachments.

== Legend ==
The Vishnu Purana narrates the tale of Revati.

Revati was the only daughter of Kakudmi. Feeling that no human could prove to be good enough to marry his lovely and talented daughter, Kakudmi took Revati with him to Brahmaloka—abode of Brahma.

When they arrived, Brahma was listening to a musical performance by the gandharvas, so they waited patiently until the performance was finished. Then, Kakudmi bowed humbly, made his request and presented his shortlist of candidates. Brahma laughed, and explained that time runs differently on different planes of existence and that during the short time they had waited in Brahmaloka to see him, 27 chatur-yugas had passed on Earth and all the candidates had died long ago. Brahma added that Kakudmi was now alone as his friends, ministers, servants, wives, kinsmen, armies and treasures had now vanished from Earth and he should soon bestow his daughter to a husband as Kali Yuga was near.

Kakudmi was overcome with astonishment and alarm at this news. However, Brahma comforted him and added that Vishnu was currently on Earth in the forms of Krishna and Balarama and he recommended Balarama as a worthy husband for Revati.

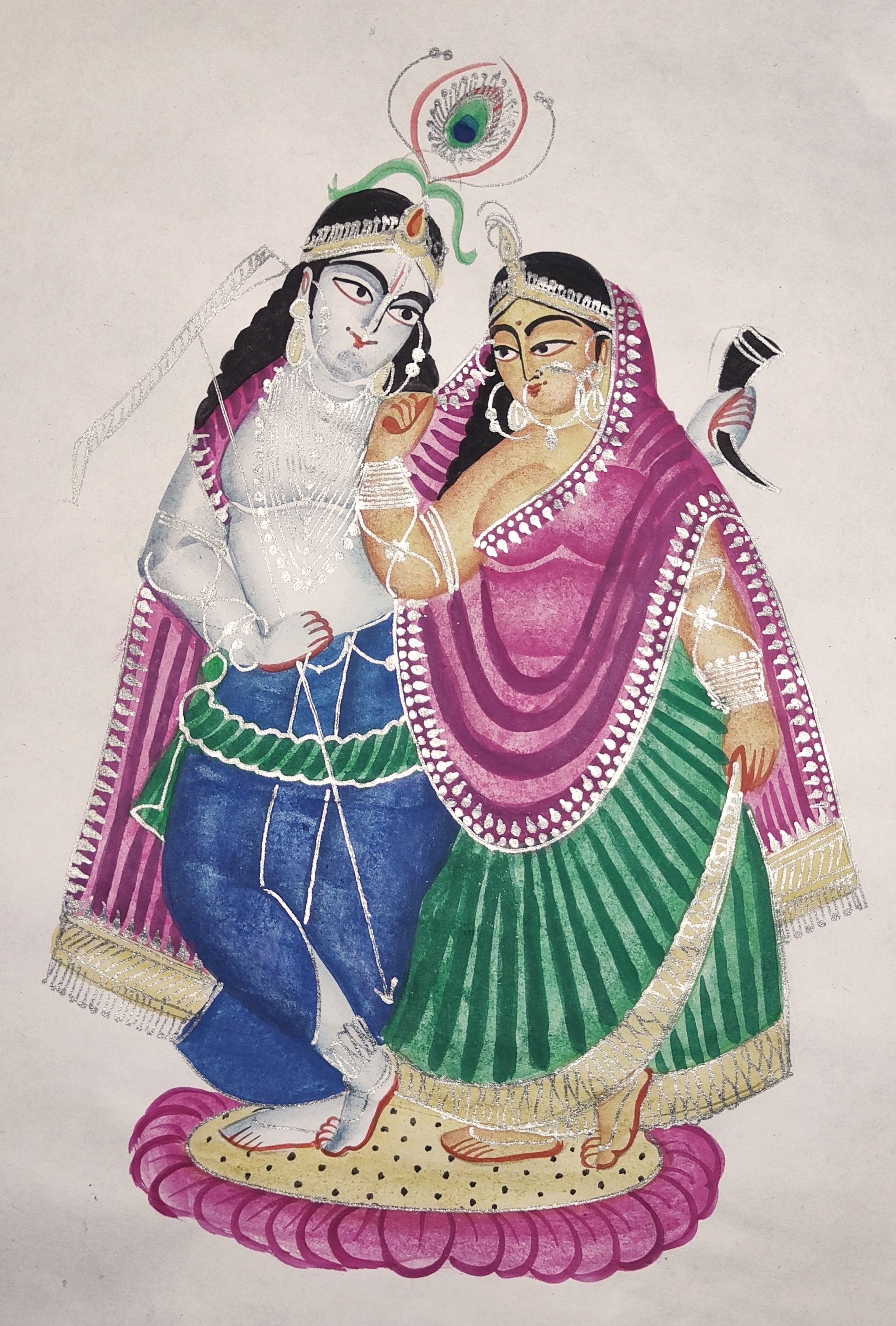
Revati and Balarama, Kalighat Painting

Kakudmi and Revati then returned to earth, which they regarded as having left only just a short while ago. They were shocked by the changes that had taken place. Not only had the landscape and environment changed, but over the intervening 27 chatur-yugas, in the cycles of human spiritual and cultural evolution, mankind was at a lower level of development than in their own time. The Bhagavata Purana describes that they found the race of men had become "dwindled in stature, reduced in vigour, and enfeebled in intellect." The king's capital of Kushasthali had been renamed Dvaraka.

Kakudmi and Revati found Balarama, and proposed the marriage. Because she was from an earlier yuga, Revati was far taller and larger than her husband-to-be, but Balarama, tapped his plough (his characteristic weapon) on her shoulder, and she shrunk to the normal height of people in Balarama's age. The marriage was then celebrated.

Revati bore her husband two sons, Nishatha and Ulmuka. Nishatha and Ulmuka were killed in the Yadu fratricidal war, after which Balarama also ended his earthly incarnation in meditation by the sea. Revati ascended the funeral pyre of her husband.

== Buddhism ==
In the Kangyur of Tibetan Buddhism, the goddess Rematī is often conflated with the goddess Revatī and a rākṣasī who is associated with the illness and mortality of children, also named Revatī.

Two extant texts in the Kangyur, In Praise of the Goddess Revatī (Toh 1091) and The Great Tantra of Supreme Knowledge (Toh 746) include both praises and dharani associated with the goddess. An abbreviated form of the latter narrative was found at Dunhuang titled The Dhāraṇī of the Goddess Revatī (lha mo nam gru ma’i gzungs, IOL Tib J 442/2).

In The Great Tantra of Supreme Knowledge, a congregation of deities and sages address Vajrapani with a ritual for taming and pacification. Vajrapani replies with enthusiasm for their benevolence and their entry into the king of mandalas. When Revati appears, she is unable to enter the mandala, but still manages to frighten the gods due to her reputation for being powerful and a killer of children. When the gods seek refuge, Vajrapani becomes wrathful and declares that all hateful beings will be destroyed. The gods become overjoyed and ask Vajrapani to offer praises to Revati so that she may enter the mandala. He proceeds to do so, providing details about her family line and special qualities.

Revati is one among fifteen grahas who alarm children. A classic symptom of possession by Revati includes chewing on one’s own tongue. She appears to children in the form of a dog. This description is found in the Mahāsāhasrapramardanī Sutra and the Dharani Sutra for the Protection of All Children (佛說護諸童子陀羅尼經, T. 1028A).

Revati is also considered a class of supernatural entities associated with disease.

According to the Āryamañjuśrīmūlakalpa, Revati is the name of a yakṣiṇī invoked as follows:

“The mantra of Revatī is, ‘Homage to all the yakṣiṇīs!’ [The mantra to recite is]:

“Oṁ, red one with a red glow and wearing red unguents! Svāhā!

“Revatī is a distinguished yakṣiṇī, Playful and fond of sex. She wears a soft-red garment And has blue, curly hair.

“This yakṣa lady is adorned on every limb And always delights in the pleasures of sex. She always grants wishes and gives pleasure. One should depict her displaying a boon-granting gesture.

“Her painting should be done as before, except that Revatī is wearing garments of red silk, including an upper garment of the same material. Her complexion has a reddish glow.”
