= Garga Samhita (Vaishnavite text) =

Sanskrit text by Sage Garga

Information
- Religion: Hinduism
- Author: Garga (attributed)
- Language: Sanskrit
- Chapters: 267
- Verses: 12,000

Garga Samhita (Sanskrit: गर्ग संहिता, romanized: Garga-saṃhitā) is a Sanskrit-language Vaishnavite scripture based on the Hindu deities Radha and Krishna. Its authorship is attributed to the sage Garga, the head priest of Krishna's clan, Yadava. It is the earliest text that associates Radha Krishna and the gopis with the Holi festival.

== Chapters ==
Garga Samhita (Note: A sanmita is the collection of verses, hymns, prayers and mantras.) contains 11 khandas or parts:

Garga-samhita contents
#	Khanda (Book)	Number of chapters	Content
1	Goloka-khanda	20	Pastimes of Radha Krishna in Goloka, Structure of Goloka.
2	Vrindavana-khanda	26	Krishna's pastimes with Radha, Gopis and Gopas (cowherds); identifies various places (including Vrindavan) in the Mathura mandala (region) as the sites of these events.
3	Giriraja-khanda	11	Divinity of Govardhan Hill and its festivals
4	Madhurya-khanda	24	Love life of Radha Krishna in Vrindavan, including descriptions of Radha Krishna, Gopis, and Yamuna
5	Mathura-khanda	25	Krishna's return to Mathura, and his killing of Kamsa; conversation between Uddhava and Gopis
6	Dvaraka-khanda	22	Foundation of the Dvārakā city, its description, and Krishna's pastimes there
7	Vishvajit-khanda	50	Krishna's exploits and divinity, including his role in the Mahabharata War
8	Balabhadra-khanda	13	Balarama's exploits and divinity
9	Vijnana-khanda	10	Devotional instructions for deity worship
10	Ashvamedha-khanda	62	Ugrasena's ashvamedha; Radha-Krishna's reunion in Vrindavan and departure to Goloka
11	Garga-samhita Mahatmaya	4	Significance of Garga-samhita

== Translations ==
The Garga Samhita also called Garga Bhagavatam is translated into the Telugu poetic form by Chivukula Appiah Sastry.

== See also ==
- Valmiki Samhita
- Brahma Samhita
- Brahma Vaivarta Purana
