= Kakudmi =

Father of Revati in Hinduism

- Texts: Puranas

Genealogy
- Parents: Revata (father)
- Children: Revati

Kakudmi (Sanskrit: ककुद्मि, romanized: Kakudmi), also called Raivata (Sanskrit: रैवत, romanized: Raivata meaning son of Revata), is a king featured in Hindu literature. Kakudmi is described to be the king of Kushasthali. He is the son of Revata, and the father of Revati, the consort of the deity Balarama. His account is given within a number of texts such as the Mahabharata, the Harivamsha, the Devi Bhagavatam, and the Bhagavata Purana.

== Legend ==
=== Audience with Brahma ===
According to the Bhagavata Purana and the Vishnu Purana, Kakudmi's daughter, Revati, was so beautiful and accomplished that when she reached a marriageable age, she could find no man worthy of her. Hence, he went to Satyaloka to seek an audience with Brahma, to seek his advice about a suitable husband for his daughter. When the two arrived, Brahma was listening to a musical performance by the gandharvas Hāha and Hūhu, so they waited patiently until the performance was finished. Then, Kakudmi bowed humbly, and made his request, presenting his shortlist of candidates. Brahma smiled and explained to the king that many successions of ages had passed on earth while they had been listening to the singers at his realm. He stated that the twenty-eighth age of the Manvantara was presently upon them, and that all of his candidates for husbands were now long gone, and so were their descendants. He advised Kakudmi to find another husband for Revati.

King Kakudmi was overcome with astonishment upon hearing this news. However, Brahma comforted him, and informed him that Vishnu, the preserver deity, was currently incarnate on earth in the forms of Krishna and Balarama. He recommended Balarama as a worthy husband for Revati. Kakudmi and Revati then returned to earth, which they regarded as having left only just a short while ago. They were shocked by the changes that had taken place. Not only had the landscape and environment changed, but over the intervening 27 chaturyugas (116,640,000 years), mankind was at a lower level of development than in their own time. The Bhagavata Purana describes that they found the race of men had become "dwindled in stature, reduced in vigour, and enfeebled in intellect." Their city of Kushasthali was now called Dvaraka. The duo found Balarama and proposed the marriage, which was accepted. Finding his bride to be taller than him, Balarama is stated to have tapped her on the head with his plough, which reduced her to the average size of humans of that age.

=== Penance ===
After the wedding of his daughter had been celebrated, Kakudmi considered his fatherly duties to have been completed. Following the advice Brahma gave him during their meeting, he went north to the Himalayas, to Badrinath (the place where Nara-Narayana are said to have resided) to engage in meditation and ascetic practices.

The Devi Bhagavatam describes that "according to Brahma's injunction, he became engaged in severe austerities in Badrinath and, when the time of death arrived, left off his mortal coil on the banks of the river and went to the world of Gods."

== See also ==
- Bhishmaka
- Muchukunda
- Ambarisha
