= Balarama =

Hindu god and brother of Krishna

- God of Agriculture and Strength
- Member of Dashavatara
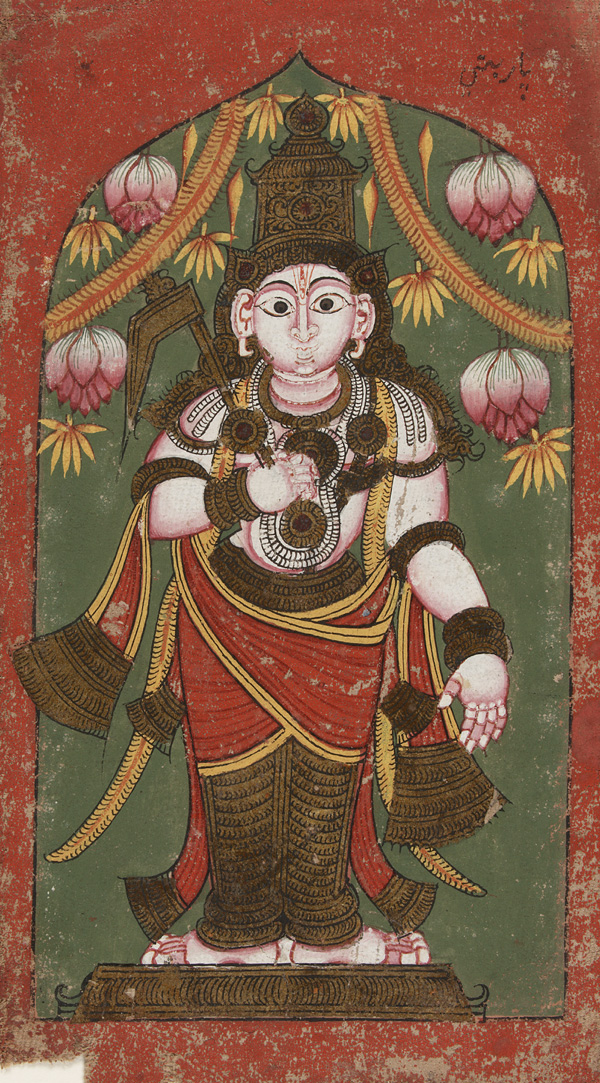
- An Early 18th century depiction of Balarama from a wall hanging in a South Indian temple
- Affiliation: Avatar of Shesha in Bhagavata Vaishnavism; eighth avatar of Vishnu in some Vaishnava traditions
- Abode: Vaikuntha, Patala, Vrindavan
- Weapon: Plough, Mace
- Festivals: Balarama Jayanti, Ratha Yatra

Genealogy
- Born: Gokula
- Parents: Vasudeva (father); Devaki (mother); Rohini (surrogate and foster mother)
- Siblings: Krishna, Subhadra
- Consort: Revati
- Children: Nishatha and Ulmuka (sons)
- Dynasty: Yaduvamsha – Chandravamsha

Dashavatara Sequence
- Predecessor: Rama
- Successor: Buddha

Balarama (Sanskrit: बलराम, IAST: Balarāma) is a Hindu god, and the elder brother of Krishna. He is particularly significant in the Jagannath tradition, as one of the triad deities. He is also known as Haladhara, Halayudha, Baladeva, Balabhadra, and Sankarshana.

The first two epithets associate him with hala (langala, "plough") from his strong associations with farming and farmers, as the deity who used farm equipment as weapons when needed, and the next two refer to his strength.

Originally an agricultural deity, Balarama is mostly described as an incarnation of Shesha, the serpent associated with the deity Vishnu while some Vaishnava traditions regard him as the eighth avatar of Vishnu, with Jayadeva’s Gita Govinda (c.1200) "incorporat[ing] Balarama into the pantheon" as the ninth of the 10 principal avatars of Vishnu.

Balarama's significance in Indian culture has ancient roots. His image in artwork is dated to around the start of the common era, and in coins dated to the second-century BCE. In Jainism, he is known as Baladeva, and has been a historically significant farmer-related deity.

== History ==
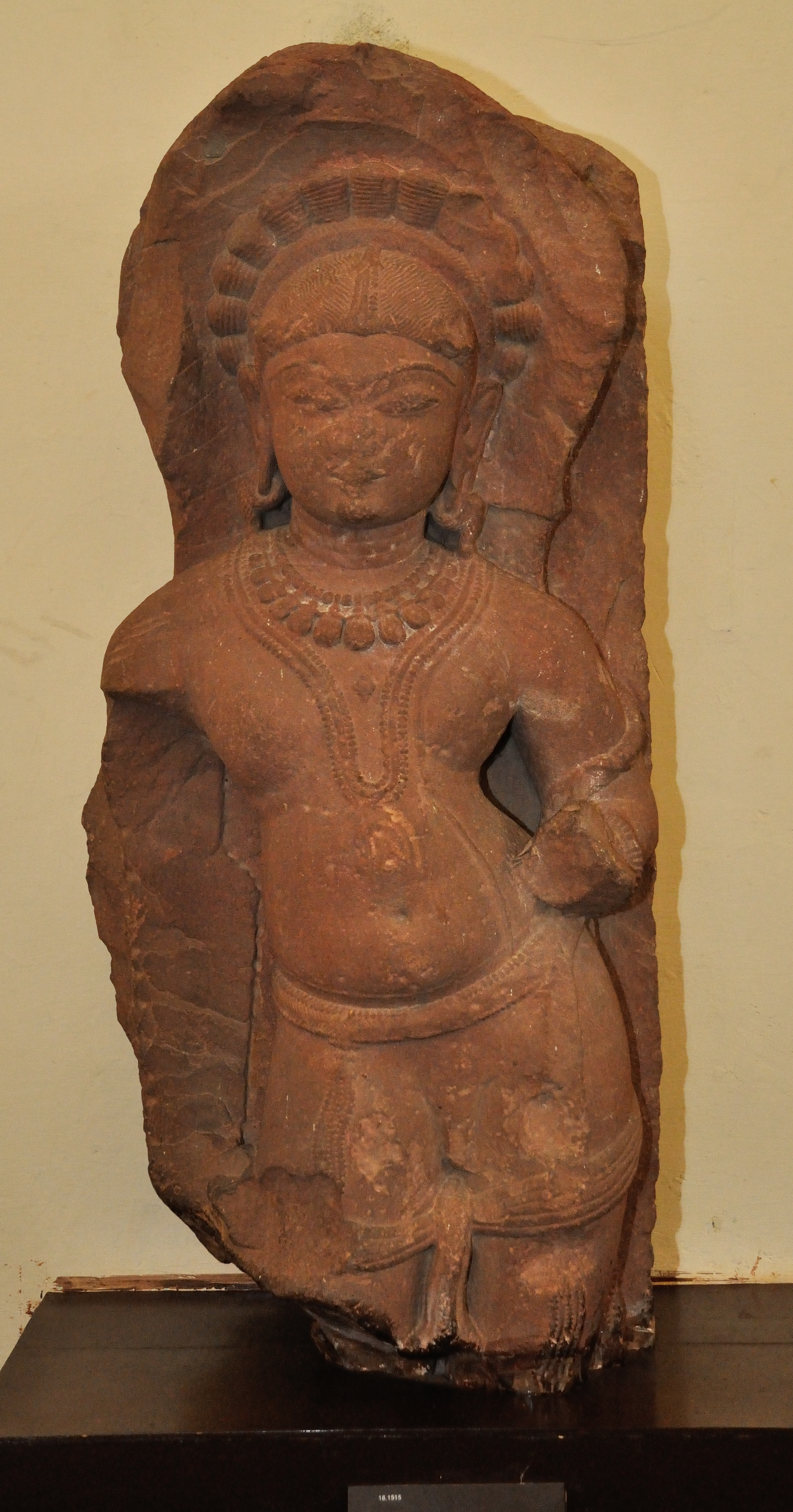
Balarama from Mathura, Early Medieval period (8th–13th century CE).

Balarama is an ancient deity, a prominent one by the epics era of Indian history as evidenced by archeological and numismatic evidence. His iconography appears with Nāga (many-headed serpent), a plough and other farm artifacts such as a watering pot, possibly indicating his origins in a bucolic, agricultural culture.

=== Texts ===
Narratives of Balarama are found in Mahabharata, Harivamsha, Bhagavata Purana, and other Puranas. He is identified with the vyuha avatar of Sankarshana, along with the deities of Shesha and Lakshmana. The legend of Balarama as the avatar of Shesha, the demigod-serpent Vishnu rests upon, reflects his role and association with Vishnu. However, Balarama's mythology and his association with the ten avatars of Vishnu is relatively younger and post-Vedic, because it is not found in the Vedic texts.

Balarama's legend appears in many Parva (books) of the Mahabharata. Book Three (Vana Parva) states about Krishna and him that Balarama is an avatar of Vishnu, while Krishna is the source of all avatars and existence. In some art works of the Vijayanagara Empire, temples of Gujarat and elsewhere, for example, Baladeva is the eighth avatar of Vishnu, prior to the Buddha (Buddhism) or Arihant (Jainism).

Balarama finds a mention in Kautilya's Arthashastra (4th to 2nd century BCE), where according to Hudson, his followers are described as "ascetic worshippers" with shaved heads or braided hair.

Balarama, as Baladewa, is an important character in the 11th-century Javanese text Kakawin Bhāratayuddha, the Kakawin poem based on the Mahabharata.

=== Archeology, coins, arts, and epigraphy ===
Balarama on punch-marked coins
(2nd century BCE)
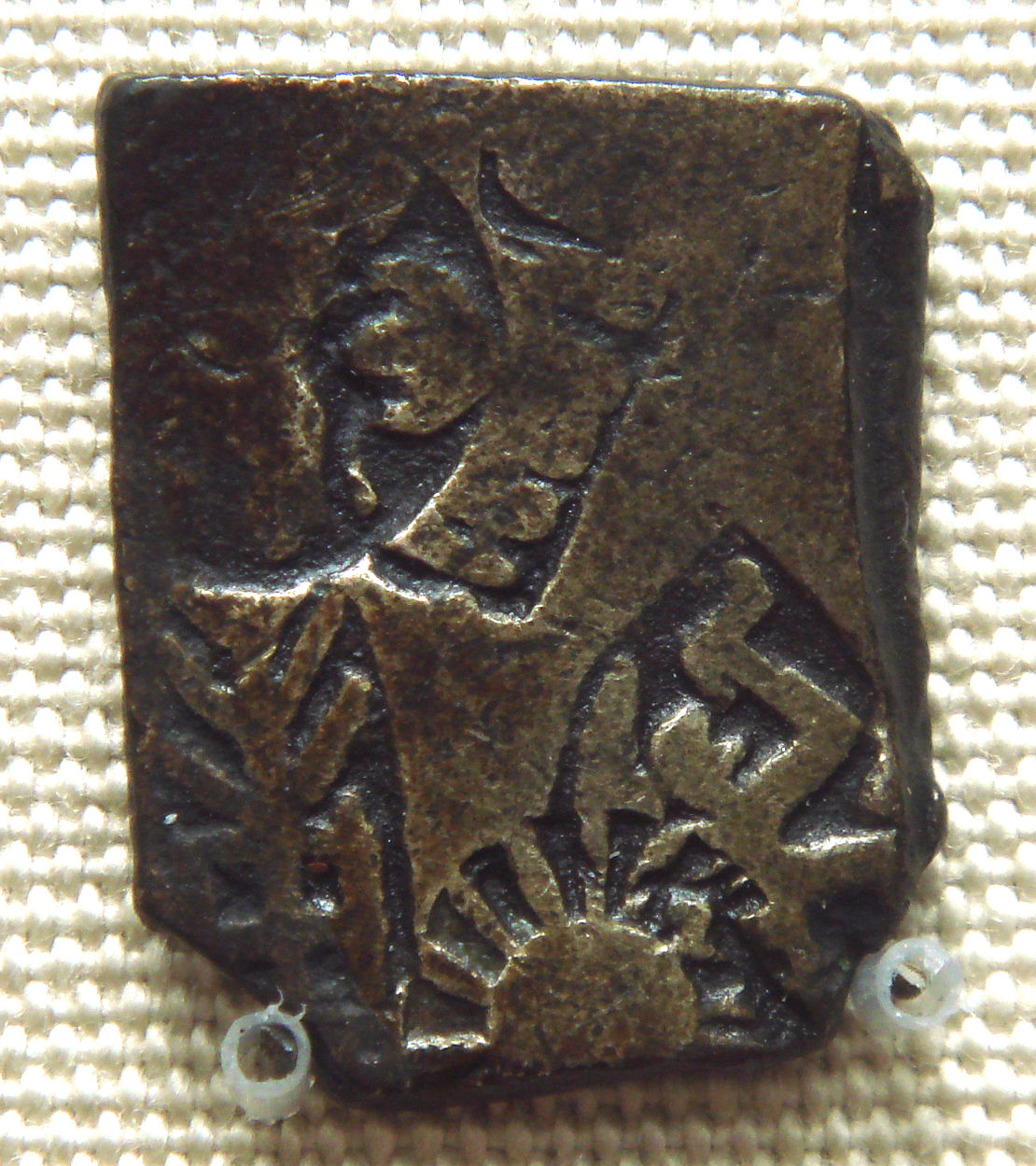
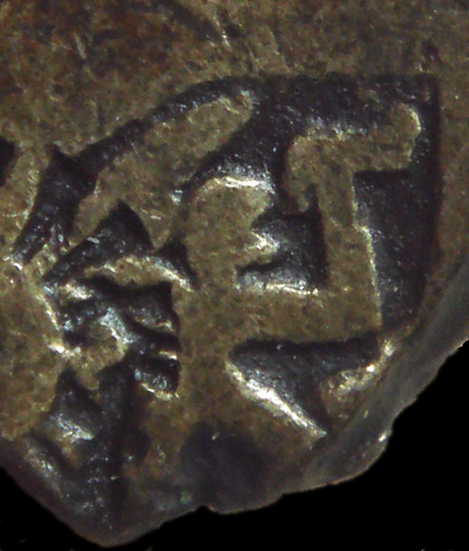
Possible depiction of Balarama on late, post-Mauryan, punch-marked coins. He is shown wielding a mace and a plough.

Balarama was anciently a powerful local deity named Samkarshana, associated with the local cult of the Vrishni heroes in Mathura from around the 4th century BCE. The concept of the avatars of Vishnu formed during the Kushan period in the 3rd to 2nd century CE.

Coins dated to about 185-170 BCE belonging to the Indo-Greek King Agathocles show Balarama's iconography and Greek inscriptions. Balarama-Samkarshana is typically shown standing with a gada in his right hand and holding a plough in his left. On the other side of these coins is Vāsudeva-Krishna holding the conch and chakra.

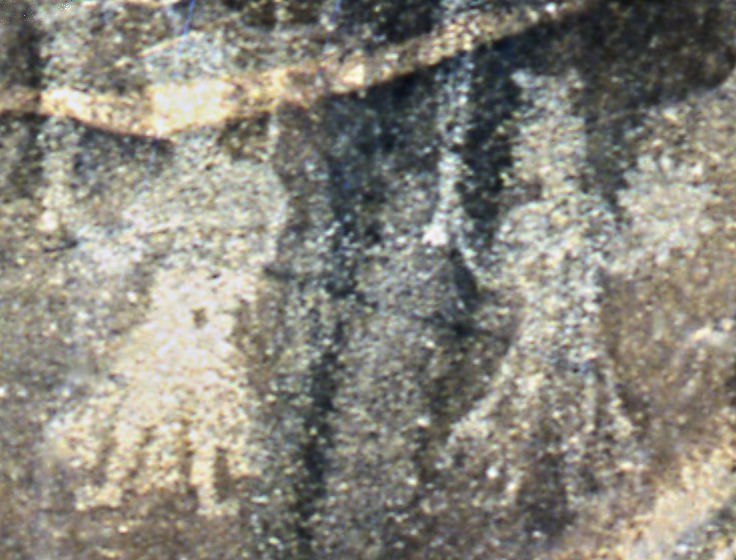
(Bala)rama and Krishna with their attributes at Chilas. The Kharoshthi inscription nearby reads Rama [kri]ṣa. 1st century CE.

Balarama on Indo-Greek coins
(190-180 BCE)
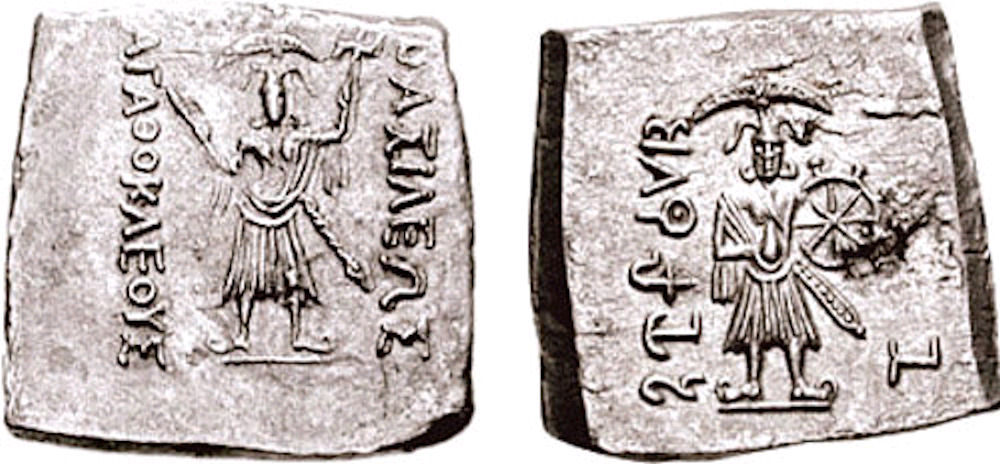
Coin of Agathocles of Bactria with depiction of Balarama, 190-180 BCE. This is "the earliest unambiguous image" of the two deities.
Obv Balarama-Samkarshana with Greek legend: ΒΑΣΙΛΕΩΣ ΑΓΑΘΟΚΛΕΟΥΣ "King Agathocles".
Rev Vāsudeva-Krishna with Brahmi legend Rajane Agathukleyasasa "King Agathocles".

At Chilas II archeological site dated to the first half of 1st-century CE in northwest Pakistan, near Afghanistan border, are engraved two males along with many Buddhist images nearby. The larger of the two males hold a plough and club in his two hands. The artwork also has an inscription with it in Kharosthi script, which has been deciphered by scholars as Rama-Krsna, and interpreted as an ancient depiction of the two brothers Balarama and Krishna. The early Balarama images found in Jansuti (Mathura, Uttar Pradesh) and two at Tumain (Ashoknagar, Madhya Pradesh) are dated to 2nd/1st-century BCE and these show Balarama holding a Hala (plough) and a musala (pestle) in his two hands.

In all of these early depictions, Balarama-Samkarsana seems to hold a senior position over Vāsudeva-Krishna. On the coins of Agathocles of Bactria, Balarama is on the front of the coin (the side with a legend in Greek), whereas Vāsudeva-Krishna is on the reverse (Brahmi side). At Chilas, Balarama is shown taller and bigger than Vāsudeva-Krishna. The same relationship is also visible in the hierarchy of the Vrishni heroes.

In some Indian ancient arts and texts, Balarama (Sankarsana) and Krishna (Vasudeva) are two of the five heroes (Pancaviras of the Vrishnis). The other three differ by the text. In some those are "Pradyumna, Samba and Aniruddha", in others "Anadhrsti, Sarana and Viduratha". The 1st-century Mora well inscription near Mathura, dated between 10 and 25 CE, mention the installation of five Vrishni heroes in a stone temple.

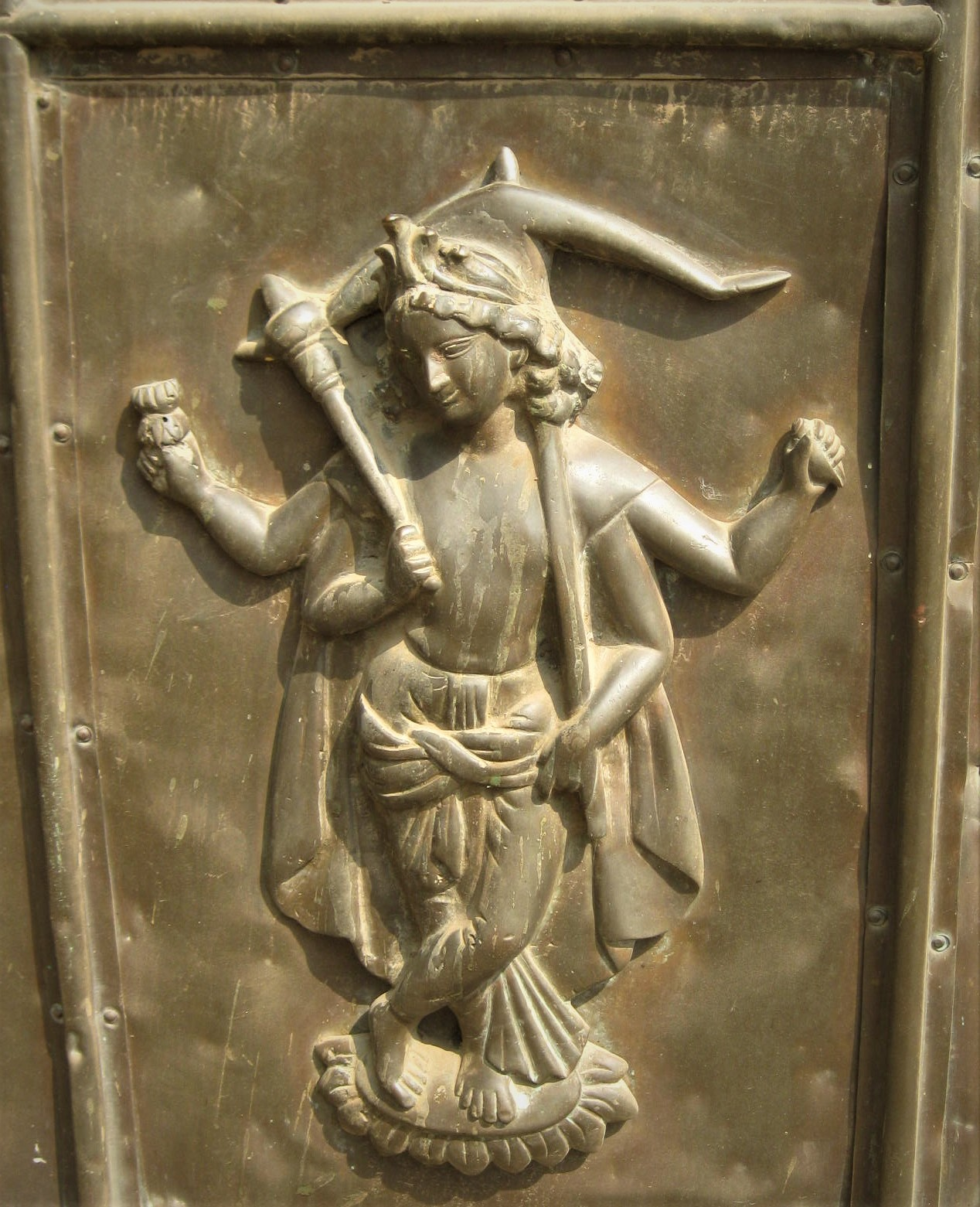
Balarama Avatar on a brass chariot of Searsole Rajbari, West Bengal, India

The earliest surviving southeast Asian artwork related to Balarama is from the Phnom Da collection, near Angkor Borei in Cambodia's lower Mekong Delta region.

== Legend ==
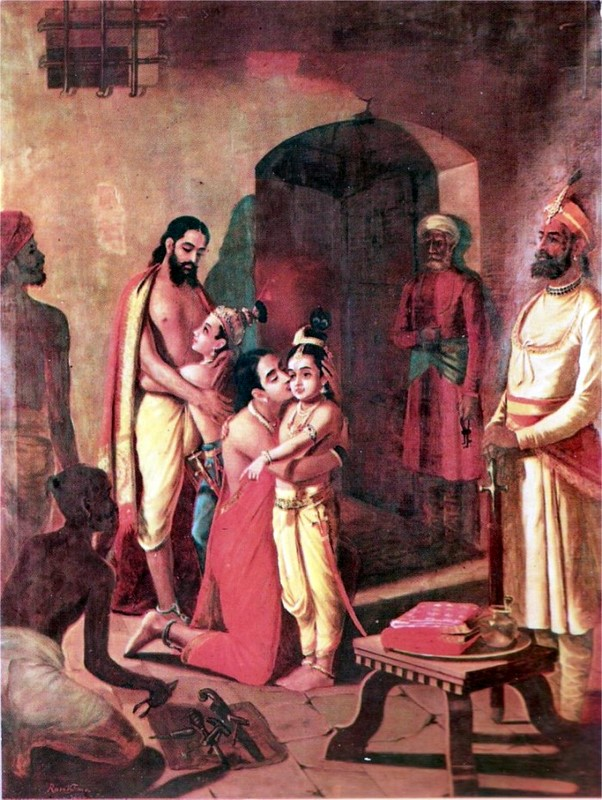
Krishna and Balarama meet their parents. 19th-century painting by Raja Ravi Varma

Balarama was the son of Vasudeva. The evil king Kamsa, the tyrant of Mathura, was intent upon killing the children of his cousin, Devaki, because of a prophecy that he would die at the hands of her eighth child. The Harivamsha states that Kamsa went on to murder the first six children of the imprisoned Devaki by smashing the newborns against a stone floor. When Balarama was conceived, Vishnu intervened, state the Hindu legends; his embryo was transferred from Devaki's womb into the womb of Rohini, Vasudeva's first wife. In some texts, this transfer gives Balarama the epithet Sankarshana (one who was dragged away). Balarama grew up with his younger brother Krishna with his foster-parents, in the household of the head of cowherds Nanda, and his wife, Yashoda. The chapter 10 of the Bhagavata Purana describes it as follows:

The Bhagavan as the Self of everything tells the creative power of His unified consciousness (yogamaya) about His plan for His own birth as Balarama and Krishna. He begins with Balarama. The whole of Shesha, which is my abode, will become an embryo in Devaki's womb which you shall transplant to Rohini's womb.

— Bhagavata Purana 10.2.8, Tr: D Dennis Hudson

He was named Rama, but because of his great strength, he was called Balarama, Baladeva, or Balabhadra, meaning Strong Rama. He was born on Shraavana Purnima, which coincides with the occasion of Raksha Bandhan.

=== Childhood and marriage ===
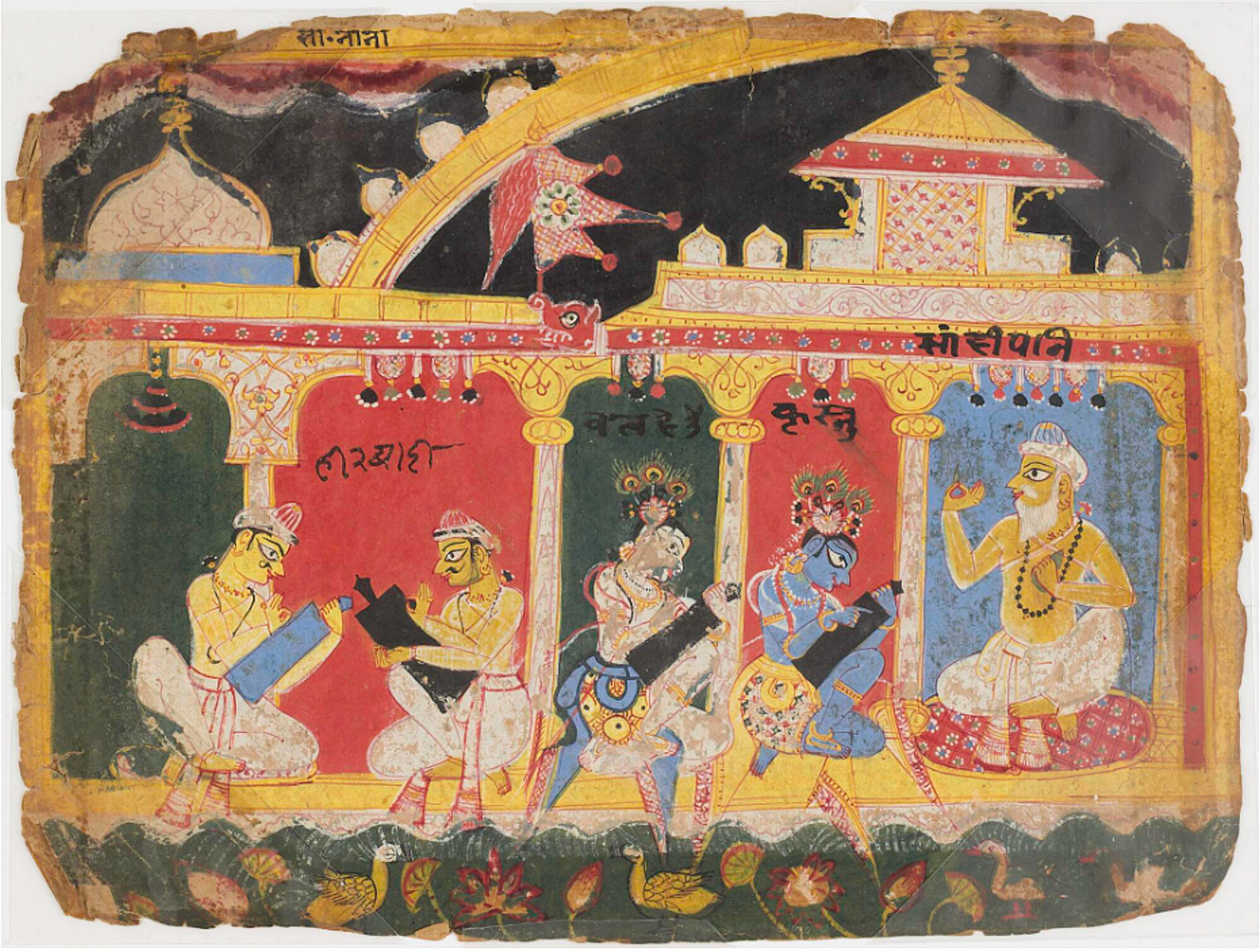
Krishna and Balarama Studying with the Brahman Sandipani (Bhagavata Purana, 1525-1550 CE print).

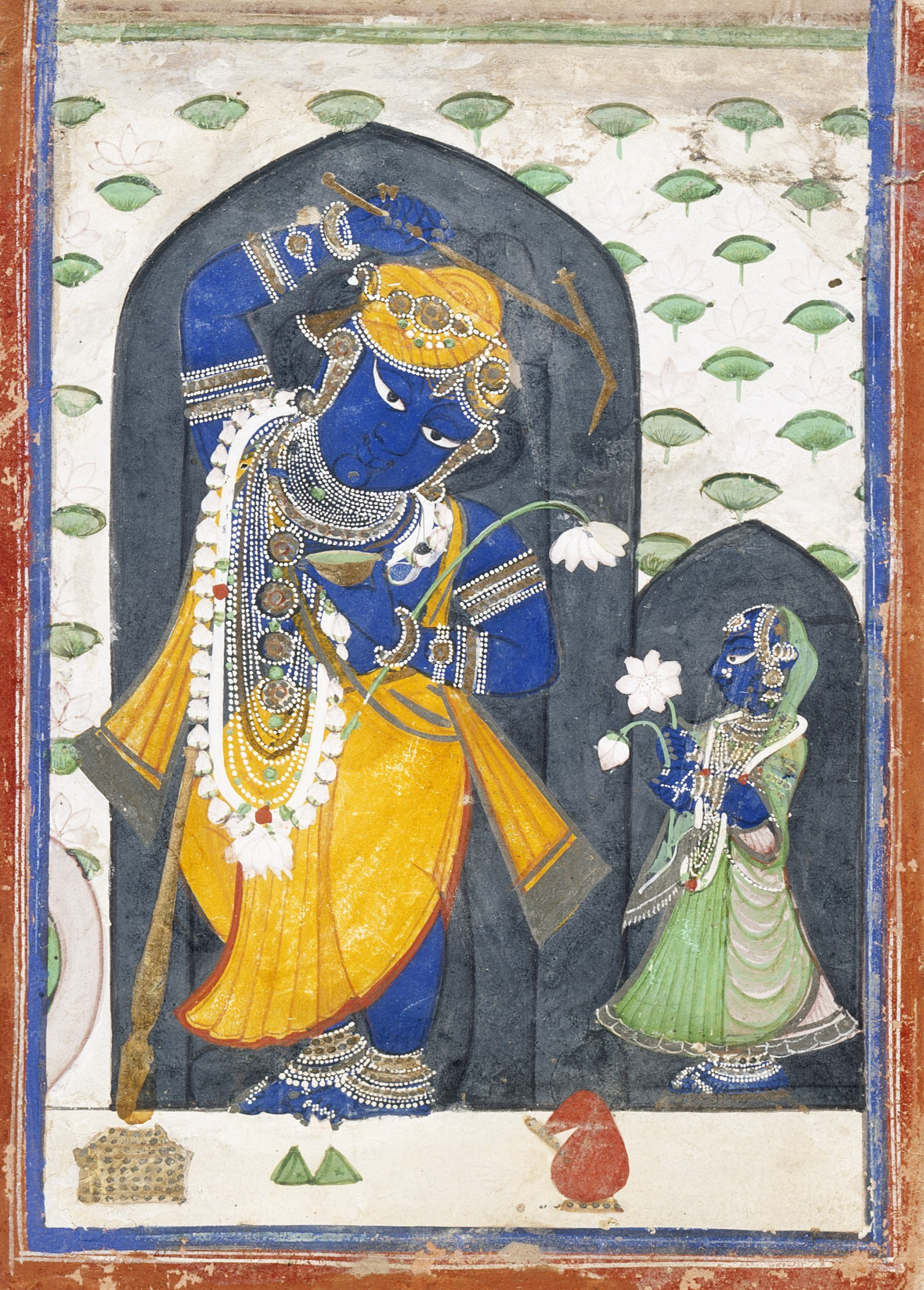
Balarama with his consort Revati (right), Nathdwara Painting.

One day, Nanda requested the presence of Sage Gargamuni, his priest, to name the newborn Krishna and Balarama. When the Garga arrived, Nanda received him well and requested the naming ceremony. Gargamuni then reminded Nanda that Kamsa was looking for the son of Devaki and if he performed the ceremony in opulence, it would come to his attention. Nanda, therefore, asked Garga to perform the ceremony in secret and Garga did so:

Because Balarama, the son of Rohini, increases the transcendental bliss of others, his name is Rama and because of his extraordinary strength, he is called Baladeva. He attracts the Yadus to follow his instructions and therefore his name is Sankarshana.

— Bhagavata Purana, 10.8.12

When his elder brother, fatigued from playing, would lie down with his head upon the lap of a cowherd boy, Lord Kṛiṣṇa would help him relax by personally massaging his feet and offering other services

— Srimad Bhagavatam, Canto 10, Chapter 15, Verse 14

Balarama spent his childhood as a cow herder with his brother Krishna. He killed Dhenuka, an asura sent by Kamsa, as well as Pralamba and Mushtika wrestlers sent by the king. When Krishna was killing Kamsa, Balarama slew his mighty commander, Kalavakra. After the evil king was slain, Balarama and Krishna went to the ashrama of sage Sandipani at Ujjain for their education. Balarama married Revati, the daughter of King Kakudmi. He had two sons - Nishatha and Ulmuka, and a daughter - Shashirekha also known as Vatsala.

Balarama is the celebrated tiller, one of the embodiments of agriculture along with livestock with whom Krishna is associated with. The plough is Balarama's weapon. In the Bhagavata Purana, he uses it to fight asuras, dig a way for Yamuna river to bring it closer to Vrindavan, and he also availed it to drag the entire capital of Hastinapura into the Ganga river.

=== Kurukshetra War ===
Balarama taught both Duryodhana of the Kauravas and Bhima of the Pandavas the art of war with a mace. When war broke between the Kauravas and the Pandavas, Balarama carried obligations for both sides and so remained neutral. He went for a pilgrimage with his nephew Pradyumna and other Yadavas during the war, and returned on the last day, to watch the fight between his disciples. When Bhima defeated Duryodhana by striking him in the thigh with his mace, a traditional violation of the rules of combat, Balarama threatened to kill Bhima. This was prevented when Krishna reminded Balarama of Bhima's vow—to kill Duryodhana by crushing the thigh he had exposed to Bhima's wife, Draupadi.

=== Disappearance ===
In the Bhagavata Purana, it is described that after Balarama took part in the battle causing the destruction of the remainder of the Yadu dynasty and witnessing the disappearance of Krishna, he sat down in a meditative state and departed from this world.

Some scriptures describe a great white snake that left the mouth of Balarama, in reference to his identity as Ananta-Sesha, a form of Vishnu. The place where he departed is situated near Somnath Temple in Gujarat.

The local people of Veraval believe about the cave near the temple place, that the white snake who came out of Balarama's mouth got into that cave and went back to Patala.

=== Significance ===
In Hindu tradition, Balarama is depicted as a farmer's patron deity, signifying the one who is "harbinger of knowledge", of agricultural tools and prosperity. He is almost always shown and described with Krishna, such as in the act of stealing butter, playing childhood pranks, complaining to Yashoda that his baby brother Krishna had eaten dirt, playing in cow sheds, studying together at the school of guru Sandipani, and fighting malevolent beasts sent by Kamsa to kill the two brothers. He is the constant companion of Krishna, ever watchful, leading to the epithet "Luk Luk Dauji" (or Luk Luk Daubaba) in the Pustimarga tradition of Vaishnavism. In the classical Tamil work Akananuru, Krishna hides from Balarama when he steals the clothes of the milkmaids while they bathe, suggesting his brother's vigilance. He is a creative store of knowledge for the agriculturists: the knowledge that dug a water channel to bring Yamuna water to Vrindavan; that restored groves, farms and forests; that produced goods and drinks.

In Hindu texts, Balarama almost always supports Krishna in form and spirit. However, there are occasions where the dialogues between Balarama and Krishna present different viewpoints, with Krishna's wisdom establishing him to be the ultimate divinity. Balarama's constant symbolic association with Krishna makes him the protector and supporter of dharma.

== Iconography ==
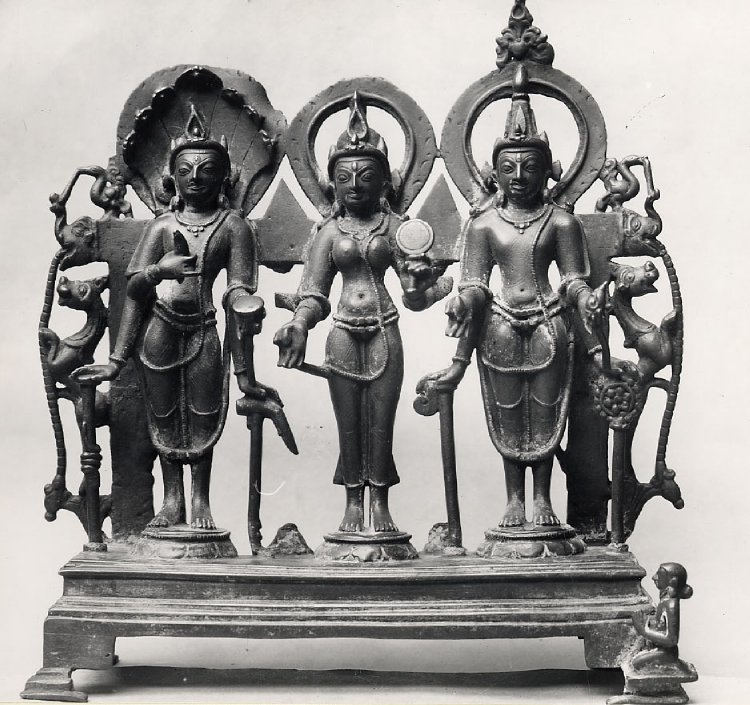
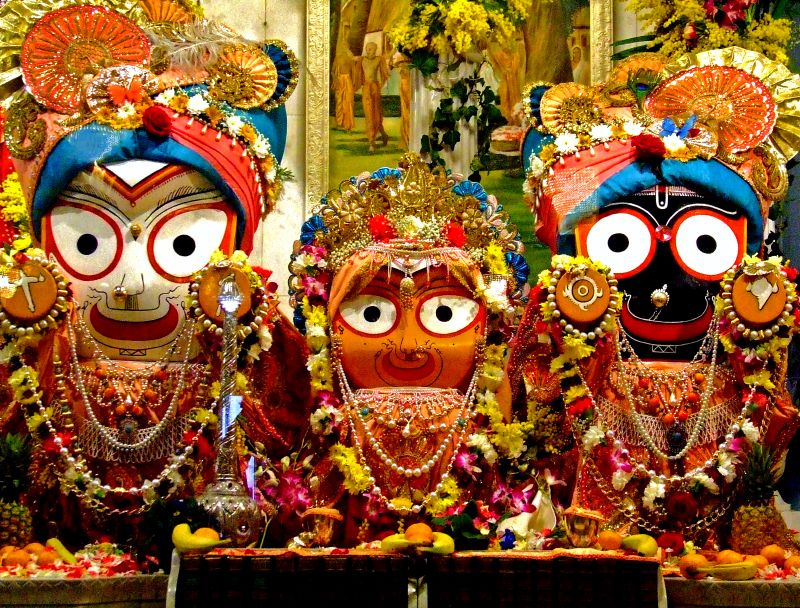
Above: 11th-century art showing Balarama with Subhadra and Vāsudeva (Krishna). Below: Abstract icons of the three in the Jagannath tradition.

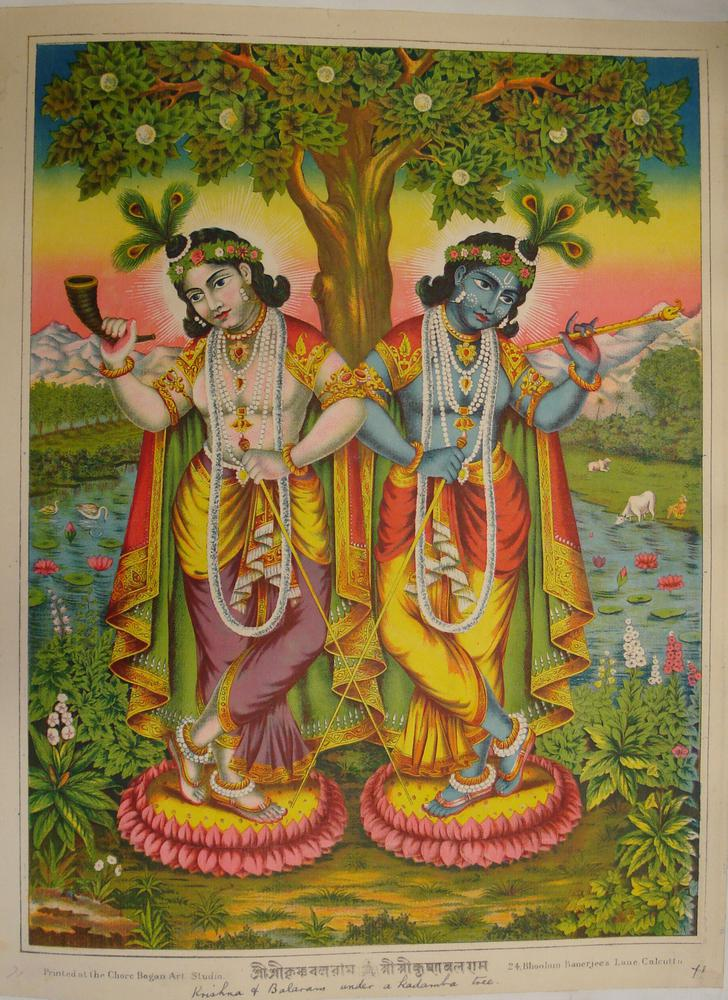
Late 19th century lithograph from Bengal depicting Krishna & Balarama. Instead of the plough, Balarama holds a bugle made out of buffalo-horn, a characteristic of Shaiva ascetics, based on the description of Nityananda, who is revered by Gaudiya Vaishnavas as Balarama's incarnation.

Balarama is depicted as light-skinned, in contrast to his brother, Krishna, who is dark-skinned; Krishna in Sanskrit means dark. His ayudha or weapons are the plough hala and the mace gadā. The plough is usually called Balachita. He often wears blue garments and a garland of forest flowers. His hair is tied in a topknot and he has earrings, bracelets and armlets; he is known for his strength, the reason for his name; Bala means strength in Sanskrit.

In the Jagannath tradition, one particularly popular in eastern and central regions of India, he is more often called Balabhadra. Balarama is one in the triad, wherein Balarama is shown together with his brother Jagannath (Krishna) and sister Subhadra (Subhadra). Jagannath is identifiable from his circular eyes compared to an oval of Shubhadra and almond-shaped eyes of the abstract icon for Balarama. Further, Balarama's face is white, Jagannath's icon is dark, and Subhadra icon is yellow. The third difference is the flat head of Jagannath icon, compared to the semi-circular carved head of abstract Balarama. The shape of Balabhadra's head, also called Balarama or Baladeva in these regions, varies in some temples between somewhat flat and semi-circular.

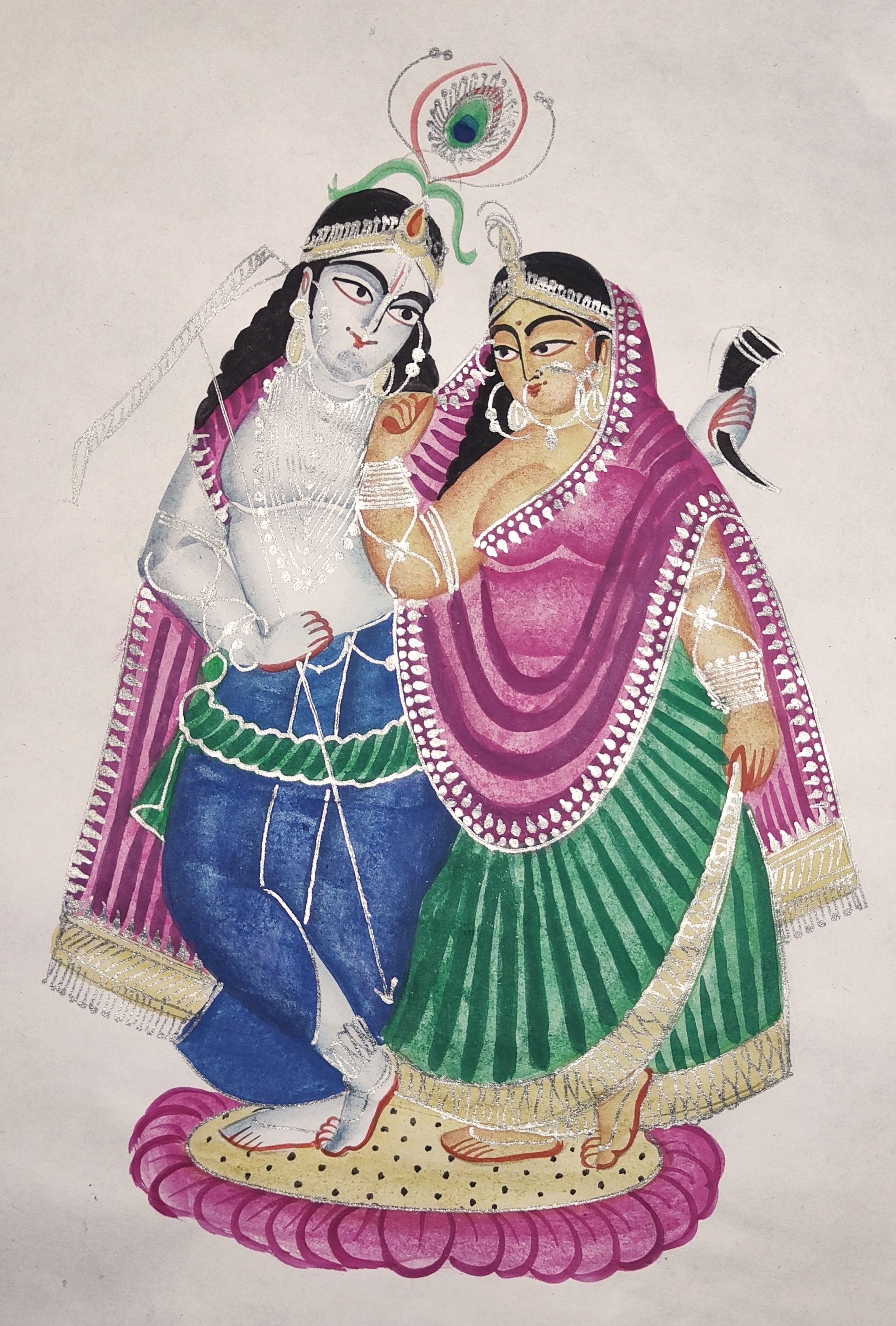
Revati and Balram, Kalighat Painting

=== Sculpture ===
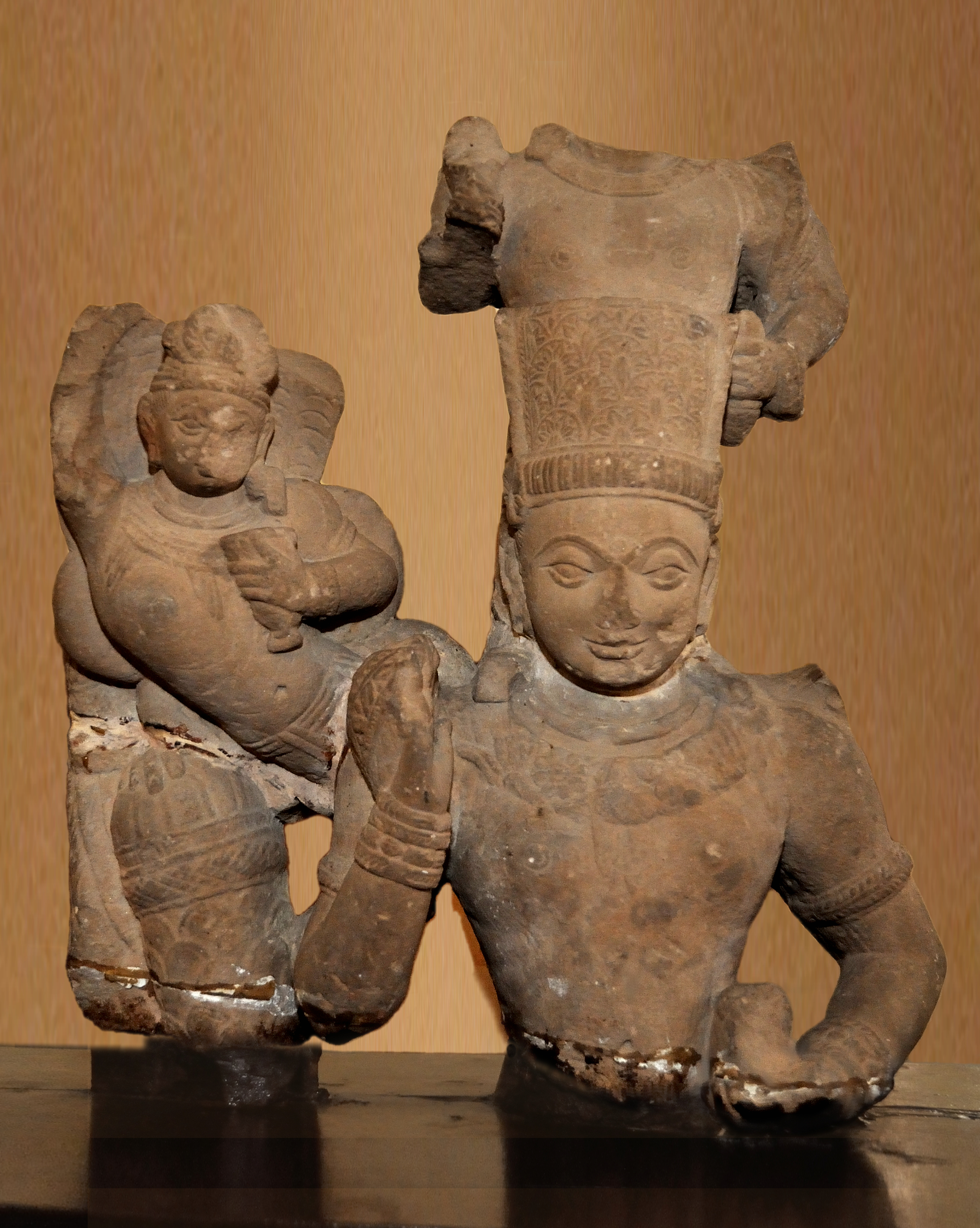
Chatur-vyūha: Balarama, with serpent hood and drinking cup, to the right of Vasudeva-Krishna. 2nd century CE, Art of Mathura.

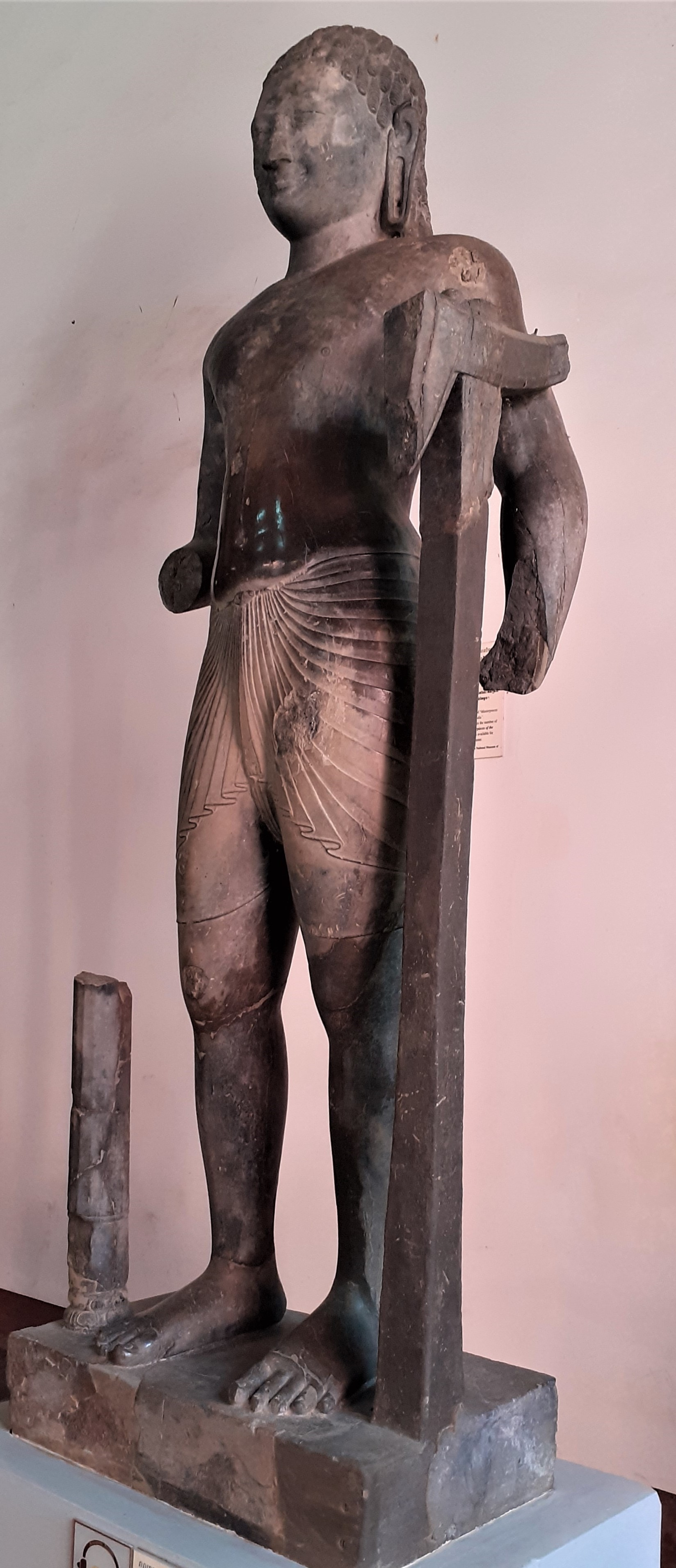
6th century Balarama from Phnom Da, Angkor Borei, Takeo, Cambodia. Now exhibits at National Museum of Cambodia.

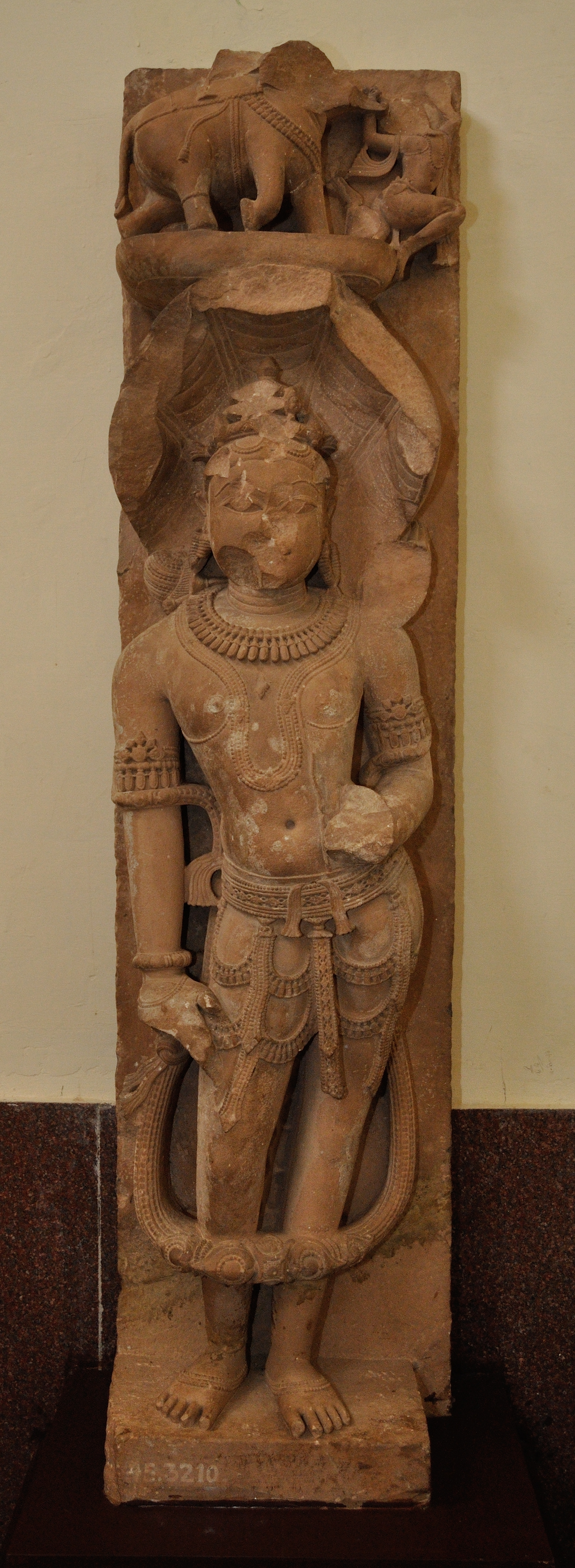
Balarama, Medieval period, Mathura

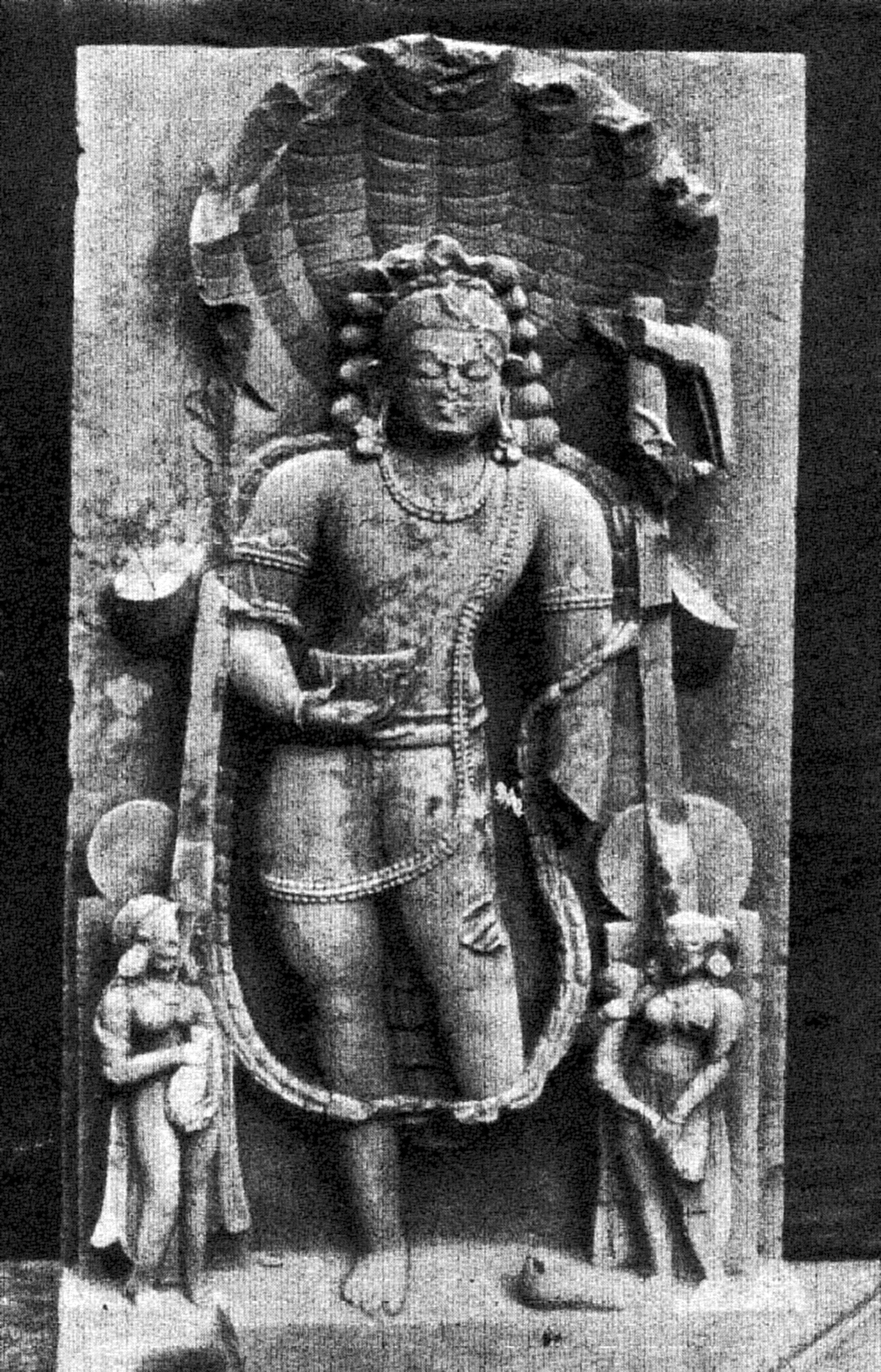
Balarama from Badoh, Medieval period

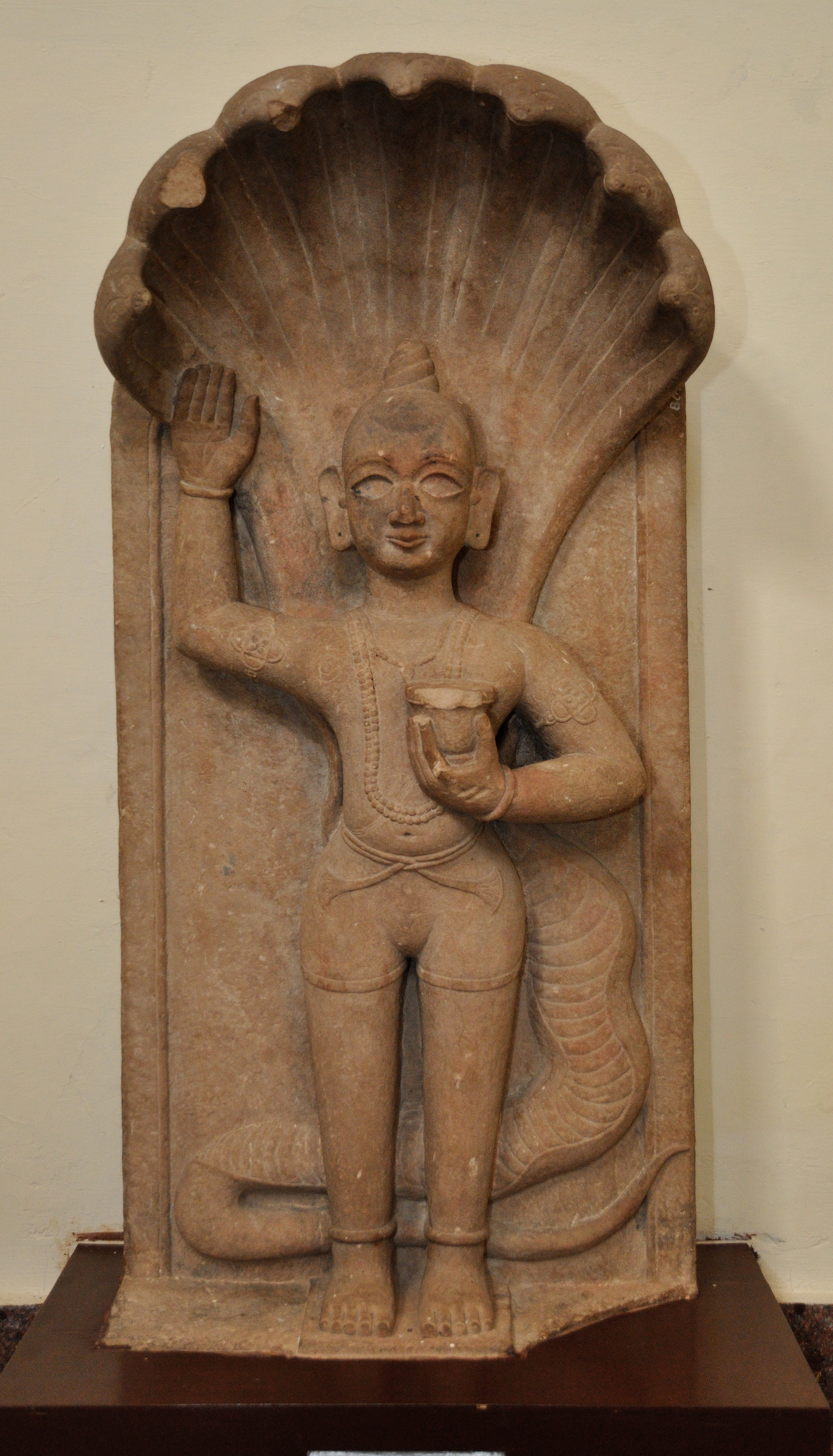
Balarama, 18th century, Mathura

=== Temples ===
- Kendrapara, Baladevjew Temple, Odisha
- Ananta Vasudeva Temple
- Kathmandu temples, Nepal
- Shri Dauji Mandir, Hathras, Uttar Pradesh

== Outside Hinduism ==
=== Jainism ===
The Jain Puranas, notably, the Triṣaṣṭiśalākāpuruṣacarita of Hemachandra, narrate hagiographical accounts of nine Baladevas or Balabhadras who are believed to be śalākāpuruṣas (literally torch-bearers, great personalities). Balarama was the ninth one. Balarama along with Krishna are considered as cousins of the revered Tirthankara Neminatha (Aristanemi) by Jains.

The Jainism tradition lists 63 Śalākāpuruṣa or notable figures which, amongst others, includes the twenty-four Tirthankaras and nine sets of triads. One of these triads is Krishna as the Vasudeva, Balarama as the Baladeva, and Jarasandha as the Prati-Vasudeva. In each age of the Jain cyclic time is born a Vasudeva with an elder brother termed the Baladeva. Between the triads, Baladeva upholds the principle of non-violence, a central idea of Jainism. The villain is the Prati-vasudeva, who attempts to destroy the world. To save the world, Vasudeva-Krishna has to forsake the non-violence principle and kill the Prati-Vasudeva. The stories of these triads can be found in the Harivamsa Purana (8th century CE) of Jinasena (not be confused with its namesake, the addendum to Mahābhārata) and the Trishashti-shalakapurusha-charita of Hemachandra.

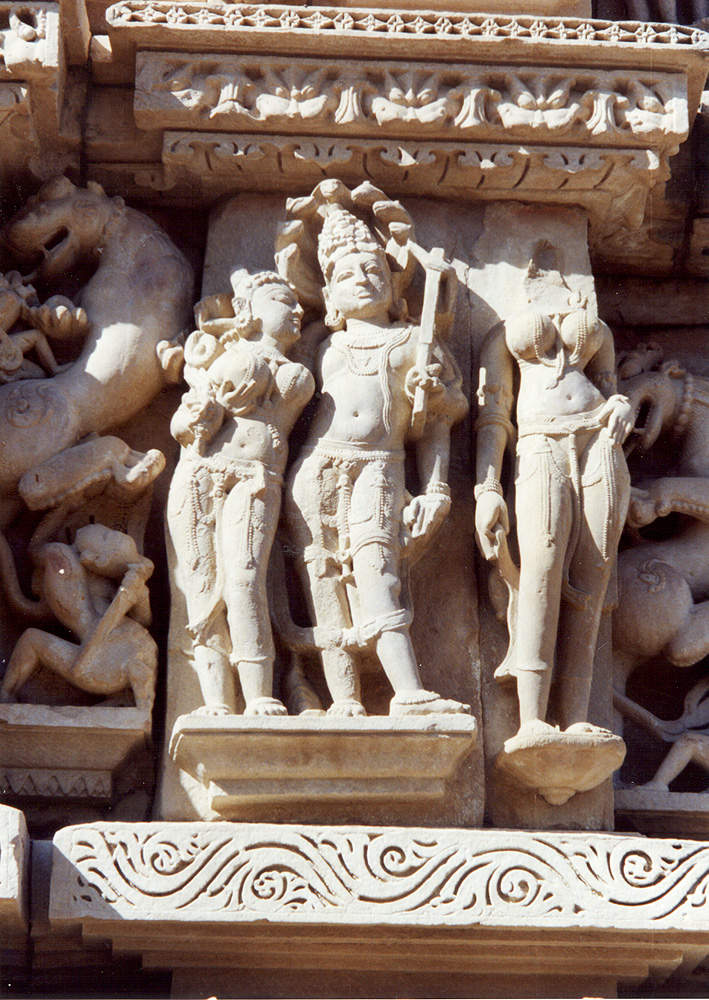
Balarama with a plough in his left hand, at the Khajuraho Parsvnatha Jain Temple.

The story of Krishna's life in the Puranas of Jainism follows the same general outline as those in the Hindu texts, but in details, they are very different: they include Jain Tirthankaras as characters in the story, and generally are polemically critical of Krishna, unlike the versions found in the Mahabharata, the Bhagavata Purana, and the Vishnu Purana. For example, Krishna loses battles in the Jain versions, and his gopis and his clan of Yadavas die in a fire created by an ascetic named Dvaipayana. Similarly, after dying from the hunter Jara's arrow, the Jaina texts state Krishna goes to the third hell in Jain cosmology, while Balarama is said to go to the sixth heaven.

In other Jain texts, Krishna and Baladeva are stated to be a cousin of the twenty-second Tirthankara, Neminatha. The Jain texts state that Naminatha taught Krishna all the wisdom that he later gave to Arjuna in the Bhagavad Gita. According to Jeffery D. Long, a professor of Religion known for his publications on Jainism, this connection between Krishna and Neminatha has been a historic reason for Jains to accept, read, and cite the Bhagavad Gita as a spiritually important text, celebrate Krishna-related festivals, and intermingle with Hindus as spiritual cousins.

Evidence related to early Jainism, states Patrick Olivelle and other scholars, suggests Balarama had been a significant farmer deity in Jain tradition in parts of the Indian subcontinent such as near the Mathura region. Jain texts such as the Kalpasutra describe the same idea of embryo transfer, as in Hindu texts for Balarama, for the 24th Tirthankara Mahavira; in the latter case, the embryo of a Brahmin woman is moved into the womb of a Kshatriya woman. Balarama, states Pratapaditya Pal, was one of the historic deities revered in Jainism along with Ambika, Lakshmi and others. As with the Hindu farmers, state Paul Dundas and other scholars, it is likely that Balarama was the patron deity of Jain farmers in the early centuries of the common era, because a large number of Balarama images have been found in early Jain arts.

=== Buddhism ===
Balarama images have been discovered in central Indian Buddhist sites, such as with Sanchi stupas at Andher, Mehgaon and Chandna. These are dated to around the start of the common era.

Religious titles
Preceded by Krishna	Ninth avatar of Vishnu	Succeeded by Kalki
