= Kanet =

Major landowning caste in himachal pradesh and uttarakhand

- Religions: Hinduism
- Country: india • Nepal

Kanet is a caste found in India natively residing in the state of Himachal Pradesh. Historically, Kanets have been engaged in agriculture and allied activities. They also generally use as a Thakur title.There is a major sub-caste of Kanets which is known as "Mukhiya".

They are native to Eastern parts of Himachal. They claim themselves to be the descendants of Hill Rajas of an Ancient Kingdom. Ethnically and linguistically, Kanets residing in middle and lower hills of Himachal are of an Indo-Aryan stock such as other Rajput clans, but there are also mixed Mongoloid-Tibetian stock of Kanets in Kinnaur and Lahul. Kanet are known by the title Thakur, Although during British times they were considered one of the agriculturalist castes of Himachal like Ghirth. The term agricultural tribe, according to the Punjab Land Alienation Act, 1900, was at that time synonymous with martial race.

== Etymology ==
The modern Name "Kanet/kunet/Kunait" is an Apabhramsha of Kuninda or Kunid [कुणिन्द/कुणीद/कुनिद ~ कुनेत/कुनैत/कनेत]

- Ku/कु changed to ka/क Or ku/कु
- ñi/णि changed to nē/णे/ने/नै
- Da/द changed to ta/त

== Origin ==
According to a theory of their origin Kanets are descendants of Kuninda (कुणिन्द/कुणीद) Dynasty which once ruled the Parts of East Himachal and to Kumaon region of Uttarakhand for a very long time till the rise of Gupta Empire and before the arrival of Medieval Era(6thCE-12thCE) Rajput Clans Chauhan, Parmar, Chandel from Central And North India. The Kingdom of Kunindas is also mentioned in Mahabharata as Kulinda. They were Defeated by the Arjuna. Kunindas are also mentioned by Panini in his Ashtadhyayi. A Kulinda/Kuninda chief named Subahu/सुबाहु' is mentioned in Mahabharata who joined the Pandavas with his army and fought against Kauravas in the battle.

One of the great kings of the Kuninda was Rajnah/Rana Amoghabhuti {राणा अमोघभूति}, who ruled in the mountainous valley of the Sutlej and Yamuna rivers (in today's southern Himachal and far western Uttarakhand in northern India around 200B.C.)

The Greek historian Ptolemy linked the origin of the Kuninda to the country where the rivers Beas, Sutlej, Yamuna and Ganges originate.

One of the Edicts of Ashoka on a pillar is also present at Kalsi, in the region of Garhwal, indicating the spread of Buddhism to the region from the 4th century BCE.

The Kuninda kingdom disappeared around the 3rd century, and from the 4th century, it seems the region shifted to Shaivite beliefs.

Kanet Thakurs/Rajputs could be the descendants of Ruling Ranas(Chieftains) of the Ancient Kuninda Tribe.

== Distribution ==
Kanet/Kunait are mostly found in central, eastern and southern Himachal Pradesh, i.e in districts like Mandi, Kullu, Sirmour, Shimla, Solan and Bilaspur with very few representation in Kangra and Hamirpur.

== Location of ancient Kunindas ==
Kuninda Kingdom
- Before 2nd century BCE–3rd century
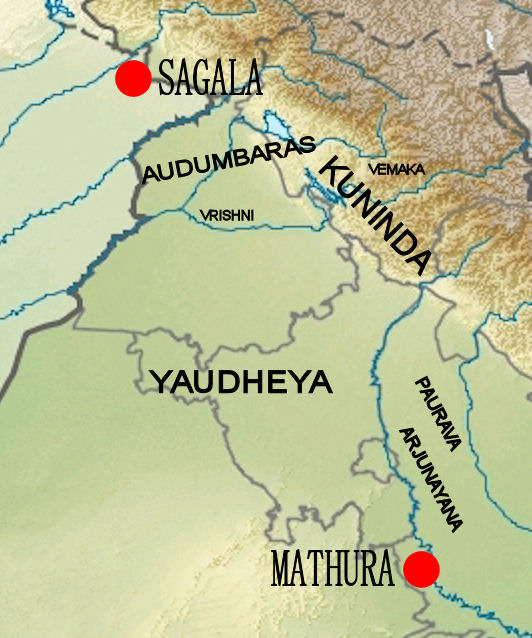
- Location of Kuninda relative to other groups: the Audumbaras, the Vemakas, the Vrishnis, the Yaudheyas, the Pauravas and the Arjunayanas.
- Government: monarchy
- History
  - Established: Before 2nd century BCE
  - Disestablished: 3rd century
- Today part of: India

== See also ==
- Rajputs
- Gaddis
- Ghirth
