= Yadava =

Ancient people from India

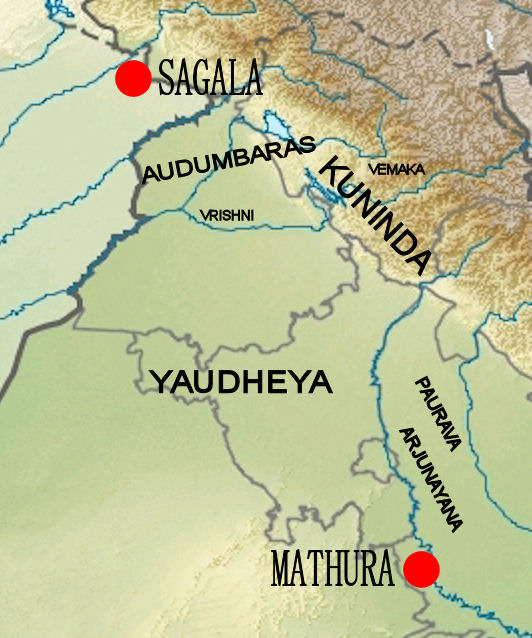
The Vrishnis are one of the Yadava clans, located in the region of Mathura. Location of the Vrishni among other groups: the Audumbaras, the Kunindas, the Vemakas, the Yaudheyas, the Pauravas and the Arjunayanas.

The Yadava (Sanskrit: यादव, romanized: yādava, lit. 'descended from Yadu') were an ancient Indian people who believed to have descended from Yadu, a legendary king of Chandravamsha lineage.

The community was formed of various clans, being the Satvatas, Andhakas, Bhojas, Kukuras, Vrishni, Surasenas, and Abhira who all worshipped Krishna. They are listed in ancient Indian literature as the segments of the lineage of Yadu (Yaduvamsha). Amongst the Yadava clans mentioned in ancient Indian literature, the Haihayas are believed to have descended from Sahasrajit, the elder son of Yadu and all other Yadava clans, which include the Chedis, the Vidarbhas, the Satvatas, the Andhakas, the Kukuras, the Bhojas, the Vrishnis and the Surasenas are believed to have descended from Kroshtu or Kroshta, a younger son of Yadu.

In the Mahabharata it is mentioned that when the Yadavas abandoned Dvārakā (Dwaraka) and Gujarat after the death of Krishna and retreated northwards under Arjuna's leadership, they were attacked and broken up.

It can be inferred from the vamshanucharita (genealogy) sections of a number of major Puranas that, the Yadavas spread out across the Aravalli region, Gujarat, the Narmada valley, the northern Deccan and the eastern Ganges valley. The Mahabharata and the Puranas mention that the Yadus or Yadavas, a confederacy comprising numerous clans were the rulers of the Mathura region. and were pastoral cowherds. The Mahabharata also refers to the exodus of the Yadavas from Mathura to Dvaraka owing to pressure from the Paurava rulers of Magadha, and probably also from the Kurus.

At various times there have been a number of communities and royal dynasties of the Indian subcontinent that have claimed descent from the ancient Yadava clans and legendary Yadava personalities, thus describing themselves as the ancient Yadavas.

== Haihayas ==
The Haihayas were an ancient confederacy of five ganas (clans), who were believed to have descended from a common ancestor, Yadu. These five clans are Vitihotra, Sharyata, Bhoja, Avanti and Tundikera. The five Haihaya clans called themselves the Talajanghas According to the Puranas, Haihaya was the grandson of Sahasrajit, son of Yadu. Kautilya in his Arthaśāstra mentioned about the Haihayas. In the Puranas, Arjuna Kartavirya conquered Mahishmati from Karkotaka Naga and made it his capital.

Later, the Haihayas were also known by the name of the most dominant clan amongst them — the Vitihotras. According to the Puranas, Vitihotra was the great-grandson of Arjuna Kartavirya and eldest son of Talajangha. Ripunjaya, the last Vitihotra ruler of Ujjayini was overthrown by his amatya (minister) Pulika, who placed his son, Pradyota on the throne. The Mahagovindasuttanta of the Dighanikaya mentions about an Avanti king Vessabhu (Vishvabhu) and his capital Mahissati (Mahishmati). Probably he was a Vitihotra ruler.

== Shashabindus ==
In the Balakanda (70.28) of the Ramayana, the Shashabindus are mentioned along with the Haihayas and the Talajanghas. The Shashabindus or Shashabindavas are believed as the descendants of Shashabindu, a Chakravartin (universal ruler) and son of Chitraratha, great-great-grandson of Kroshtu.

== Chedis ==
The Chedis or Chaidyas were an ancient Yadava clan, whose territory was conquered by a Kuru king Vasu, who thus obtained his epithet, Chaidyoparichara (the overcomer of the Chaidyas) or Uparichara (the overcomer). According to the Puranas, the Chedis were descendants of Chidi, son of Kaishika, grandson of Vidarbha, a descendant of Kroshta.

== Vidarbhas ==
According to the Puranas, the Vidarbhas or Vaidarbhas were descendants of Vidarbha, son of Jyamagha, a descendant of Kroshtu. Most well known Vidarbha king was Bhishmaka, father of Rukmin and Rukmini. In the Matsya Purana and the Vayu Purana, the Vaidarbhas are described as the inhabitants of Deccan (Dakshinapatha vasinah).

== Satvatas ==
According to the Aitareya Brahmana (VIII.14), the Satvatas were a southern people held in subjection by the Bhojas. The Satapatha Brahmana (XIII.5.4.21) mentions that Bharata seized the sacrificial horse of the Satvatas. Panini, in his Ashtadhyayi mentions the Satvatas also as being of the Kshatriya gotra, having a sangha (tribal oligarchy) form of government but in the Manusmriti (X.23), the Satvatas are placed in the category of the Vratya Vaishyas.

According to a tradition, found in the Harivamsa (95.5242-8), Satvata was a descendant of the Yadava king Madhu and Satvata's son Bhima was contemporary with Rama. Bhima recovered the city of Mathura from the Ikshvakus after the death of Rama and his brothers. Andhaka, son of Bhima Satvata was contemporary with Kusha, son of Rama. He succeeded his father to the throne of Mathura.

The Andhakas, the Vrishnis, the Kukuras, the Bhojas and the Surasenas are believed to have descended from Satvata, a descendant of Kroshtu. These clans were also known as the Satvata clans.

=== Andhakas ===
According to the Ashtadhyayi (IV.1.114) of Panini, the Andhakas were of the Kshatriya gotra, having a sangha (tribal oligarchy) form of government In the Drona Parva (141.15) of the Mahabharata, Andhakas were categorized as the Vratyas (deviators from orthodoxy). According to the Puranas, the Andhakas were the descendants of Bhajamana, son of Andhaka and grandson of Satvata.

According to the Mahabharata, the allied army of the Andhakas, the Bhojas, the Kukuras and the Vrishnis in the Kurukshetra War was led by Kritavarma, son of Hridika, an Andhaka. But, in the same text, he was also referred as a Bhoja of Mrittikavati.

=== Bhojas ===
According to the Aitareya Brahmana (VIII.14), the Bhojas were a southern people, whose princes held the Satvatas in subjection. The Vishnu Purana (IV.13.1-61) mentions the Bhojas as a branch of the Satvatas. According to this text, Bhojas of Mrittikavati were descendants of Mahabhoja, son of Satvata. However, according to a number of other Puranic texts, the Bhojas were descendants of Babhru, grandson of Satvata. In the Adi Parva of the Mahabharata (85.3533) and in a passage of the Matsya Purana (34.30) the Bhojas are mentioned as the mlecchas. Another passage of the Matsya Purana (44.69) describes them as pious and the performers of the religious rites.

=== Kukuras ===
Kautilya in his Arthaśāstra (XI.1.5), describes the Kukuras as a clan, having sangha (tribal oligarchy) form of government, whose leader uses the title of rājā (rājaśabdopajīvinah). According to the Bhagavata Purana, the Kukuras occupied the territory around Dwarka. The Vayu Purana mentions that the Yadava ruler Ugrasena belonged to this clan (Kukurodbhava). According to the Puranas, Ahuka, an Kukura, had two sons by a Kashi princess, Ugrasena and Devaka. Ugrasena had nine sons and five daughters, Kamsa being the eldest. Devaka had four sons and seven daughters, Devaki was one of them. Kamsa usurped the throne of Mathura after imprisoning Ugrasena. But later he was killed by Krishna, son of Devaki, who re-installed Ugrasena to the throne.

The Nashik Cave Inscription of Gautami Balashri mentions that her son Gautamiputra Satakarni conquered the Kukuras. The Junagadh Rock Inscription of Rudradaman I includes the Kukuras in the list of the peoples conquered by him.

=== Vrishnis ===
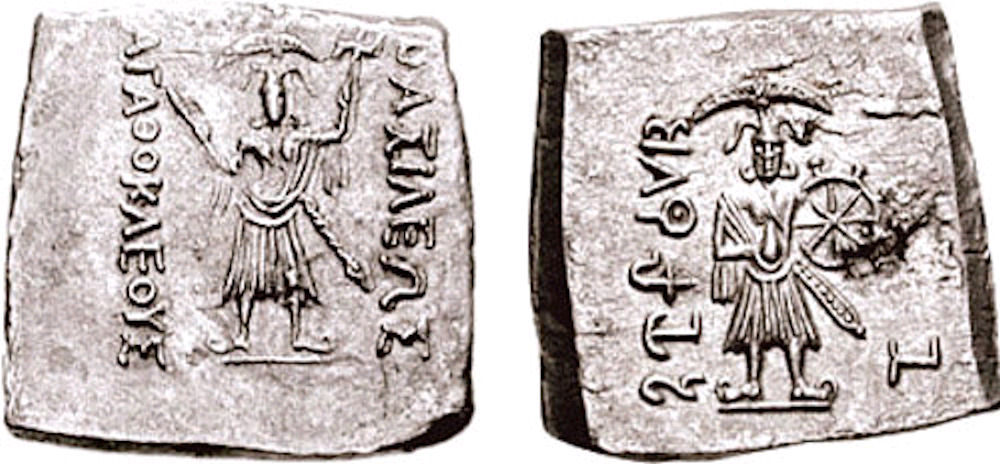
Images of Samkarshana and Vāsudeva, the two most celebrated Vrishni heroes, on a coin of the Indo-Greek king Agathocles (c. 190–180 BCE)

The Vrishnis are mentioned in a number of Vedic texts, which include the Taittiriya Samhita (III.2.9.3), the Taittiriya Brahmana (III.10.9.15), the Satapatha Brahmana (III.1.1.4) and the Jaiminiya Upanishad Brahmana (I.6.1). The Taittiriya Samhita and the Jaiminiya Upanishad Brahmana mention about a teacher, Gobala belonging to this clan.

Although, Panini, in his Ashtadhyayi (IV.1.114) includes the Vrishnis in the list of the clans of the Kshatriya gotra, having a sangha (tribal oligarchy) form of government, but in the Drona Parva (141.15) of the Mahabharata, the Vrishnis, like the Andhakas were categorized as the Vratyas (apsotates). In the Shanti Parva (81.25) of the Mahabharata, the Kukuras, the Bhojas, the Andhakas and the Vrishnis are together referred as a sangha, and Vasudeva Krishna as Sanghamukhya (seignor of the sangha) According to the Puranas, Vrishni was one of the four sons of Satvata. Vrishni had three (or four) sons, Anamitra (or Sumitra), Yudhajit and Devamidhusha. Shura was son of Devamidhusha. His son Vasudeva was father of Balarama and Krishna.

According to the Harivamsa (II.4.37-41), the Vrishnis worshipped goddess Ekanamsha, who, elsewhere in the same text (II.2.12), described as daughter of Nandagopa. The Mora Well Inscription, found from a village near Mathura and dated to the early decades of the Common era records the installation of the images of the five Vrishni viras (heroes) in a stone shrine by a person, named Tosha. These five Vrishni heroes have been identified with Samkarshana, Vasudeva, Pradyumna, Aniruddha and Samba from a passage in the Vayu Purana (97.1-2).

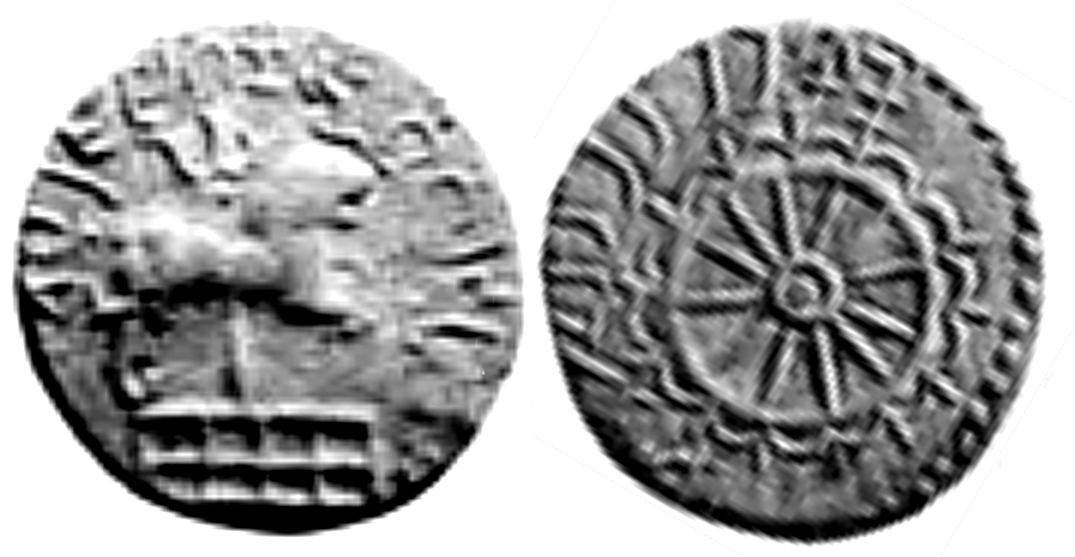
A Vrishni silver coin from Alexander Cunningham's Coins of Ancient India: From the Earliest Times Down to the Seventh Century (1891)

A unique silver coin of the Vrishnis was discovered from Hoshiarpur, Punjab. This coin is presently preserved in the British Museum, London. Later, a number of copper coins, clay seals and sealings issued by the Vrishnis were also discovered from Sunet, near Ludhiana.

==== Shaineyas ====
The Shaineyas are believed to have descended from Shini, son of Anamitra, son of Vrishni. In the Mahabharata and the Puranas, the most notable Shaineya was Yuyudhana, son of Satyaka and grandson of Shini. He was a contemporary of Krishna. According to the Puranas, Asanga and Yugandhara were his son and grandson respectively.

==== Akrura and the Syamantaka ====
A number of Puranas mention Akrura, a Vrishni, as the ruler of Dvaraka. His name is found in the Nirukta (2.2) as the holder of the jewel. In the Puranas, Akrura is mentioned as the son of Shvaphalka, who was great-grandson of Vrishni and Gandini. In the Mahabharata, the Bhagavata Purana and the Brahma Purana, he was mentioned as the keeper of the Syamantaka, the most well-known jewel of the Yadavas. According to the Puranas Akrura had two sons, Devavant and Upadeva.

=== Fratricidal war and its aftermath ===
According to the Mausala Parva (7.185-253) of the Mahabharata a few years after the Kurukshetra War, Andhaka-Vrsni Yadava clans of Dvaraka were destroyed due to a fratricidal war. Both Balarama and Krishna died soon after this war. Later, son of Kritavarma became ruler of Mrittikavati and grandson of Yuyudhana became ruler of the territory near the Sarasvati River. The rest of the surviving Yadavas took refuge in Indraprastha. Vajra, great-grandson of Krishna was installed as their king.

Vajra is mentioned as the great-grandson of Krishna in the Vishnu Purana. According to a section of this text (IV.15.34-42), he was the son of Aniruddha and Subhadra. But according or another section (V.32.6-7), he was the son of Aniruddha and Usha, daughter of Bana and granddaughter of Bali. Bahu (or Pratibahu) was his son and Sucharu was his grandson. Elsewhere in this text (V.38.34), he was mentioned as installed as king in Mathura instead of Indraprastha.

The narrative of the Yadava fratricidal war is also found in two Jataka tales of the Pali Buddhist canon: the Ghata Jataka and the Samkicca Jataka. According to the Ghata Jataka, Vasudeva, Baladeva and eight other Andhaka-Venhu (probably, a corrupt form of Andhaka-Venhi, Pali equivalent to Sanskrit Andhaka-Vrishni) brothers seized Dvaravati and killed its king Kamsa. Later, these brothers fought amongst themselves and except Vasudeva and Baladeva everybody died. Vasudeva and Baladeva also died soon after. The Samkicca Jataka mentions that the Andhaka-Venhus killed each other. Kautilya also in his Arthaśāstra (I.6.10) mentioned about the destruction of Vrishni clan because of their foolhardiness.

== Yadava Kinship system ==
According to a modern historian, Romila Thapar, the kinship system of the Yadavas shows traces of matrilineal structure, which is found from the mention of their cross-cousin marriages. This is particularly prohibited in the Indo Aryan kinship system. The Vishnu Purana mentions that Krishna married Rukmini, a Vidarbha princess. His son Pradyumna married Rukmavati, daughter of Rukmi, brother of Rukmini. Pradyumna's son Aniruddha married Rochana, granddaughter of Rukmi.

== Shurasenas and Krishna ==
The Buddhist and Jaina texts list 16 powerful states (shodasha mahajanapada), which flourished in the early 6th century BCE. Shurasena was one of such states mentioned in the Anguttara Nikaya, a Buddhist text. The capital of the Shurasenas was Mathura, which was also known as Madura. Megasthenes (c. 350 – 290 BCE) mentions that the Sourasenoi (Shurasenas), who lived in the Mathura region, worshipped Herakles, by which he may have meant Vasudeva Krishna, the Indian god bearing the closest resemblance to Herakles. The worship of Vasudeva Krishna seems to have originated in the Mathura region.

A number of traditions exist regarding the origin of the Shurasenas. According to a tradition, found in the Linga Purana (I.68.19), Shurasenas were descendants of Shurasena, son of Arjuna Kartavirya. According to another tradition found in the Ramayana (VII.62.6) and the Vishnu Purana (IV.4.46), the Shurasenas were descendants of Shurasena, son of Shatrughna, brother of Rama. According to the Devibhagavata Purana (IV.1.2), Shurasena was father of Vasudeva, father of Krishna. Alexander Cunningham in his Ancient Geography of India states that because of Surasena, his grandfather, Krishna and his descendants were known as the Surasenas. Bhasa, in his Balacharita mentions that the mother of Kamsa was a Shurasena (Shaurasenimata).

== Religion ==
Besides chiefdoms and jagirs, the peethams (seats) granted to them by virtue of their religious powers. For instance, there were fourteen seats (peethams) among the Warangal according to a sanad granted in 1425 (Shaka Samvat), by Sree Pratapa Rudra, Maharaja of Warangal, to Sree Kondiah Guru, as the head of the fourteen seats. Subsequently when Bhagyanagar was founded by Sultan Abdulla of Qutub Shahi in AD 1560 the rights of the were acknowledged and recognized, and the name Golkonda was substituted for Manugal. According to the charter awarded by the Sultan Abdullah of Qutb Shahi dynasty in 1071 Hijri, Kondiah built the fort for the sultan by using his charisma in resolving the mystery of the site, and also discovered for him gold coins buried underground. In return, the sultan gave him the Charter conferring upon Kondiah the rights and privileges due to the head of the fourteen seats, and of twelve classes of and two classes of Kondiah, although a follower of, was the head of the Peethams. Perhaps the at this time were under the influence of although they were incorporated into the category.

== See also ==
Vedic period:

- Vedas
- Bharatas (Vedic tribe)
- Puru (Vedic tribe)
- Janapada
- Rigvedic rivers
- Rigvedic Sanskrit
- Lunar dynasty
- Solar dynasty
- Historical Vedic religion
- Turvasu Druhyu and Anu dynasties
- List of ancient Indo-Aryan peoples and tribes

History of India:

- History of Hinduism
- List of Indian monarchs
- Indus Valley Civilization
- Outline of ancient India
- Pottery in the Indian subcontinent
