= Frontier states of the Gupta Empire =

The Frontier states of the Gupta Empire or the Border Kings refers to the various kingdoms and tribal republics that accepted suzerainty of the Gupta Empire.

== List of the frontier states ==
=== Frontier kingdoms ===
Sources

- Samatata: Located in modern-day eastern and southern Bangladesh.
- Davaka: Located in modern-day Assam.
- Kamarupa: Located in modern-day Assam.
- Licchavis of Nepal: Present-day Nepal.
- Kartipura: Located in present-day Kashmir or possibly a region in the Himalayas.

=== Tribal republics ===
- Malavas
- Arjunayanas
- Yaudheyas
- Madrakas
- Abhiras
- Prarjunas
- Sanakanikas
- Kakas
- Kharaparikas

== Relationship between the Frontier states and the Gupta Empire ==
The frontier states obeyed the orders of the Gupta Empire along with paying tributes and attending the imperial darbars (court) to pay homage to the emperor.

According to historian Upinder Singh, the relationship between the frontier states the Gupta Empire had "certain elements of a feudatory relationship".

== Annexation by Chandragupta II ==
After Samudragupta died, Chandragupta II ascended the throne. He annexed most of the frontier states.

== Other possible states ==
=== Anuradhapura Kingdom (Sri Lanka) ===
The Gupta inscriptions also mention a king of Simhala as one of the kings being submissive to Samudragupta. But this is likely an exaggeration because Chinese sources state that the king of Simhala only sent presents for his permission to build a Buddhist monastery and not as an act of submission.

=== Kadamba dynasty (Karnataka) ===
A 10th century Kannada inscription mentions the Gupta Empire's presence in the region.

The Gupta Empire did have Maritominal alliances with the Kadambas.
