= Amogh =

Amogh or Amogha may refer to:

- Amogh Sunil Desai (born 1992), Indian cricketer
- Amoghabhuti or Amogh, king of the Kuninda Kingdom in the late 2nd century BC
- Amogh carbine, a select-fire personal defense weapon
- Amogha missile, a guided anti-tank missile

== See also ==
- Amoghapasa inscription, Indonesian inscription
- Amoghasiddhi, an avatar of the Buddha
- Amoghavajra (705–774), Buddhist translator
- Amoghavarsha (disambiguation)
