= Hirth (surname) =

Hirth is a surname. Notable people with this surname include:

- Friedrich Hirth Ph.D. (1845–1927), German-American sinologist
- Georg Hirth (1841–1916), German writer, journalist and publisher
- Greg Hirth (born 1963), American geophysicist
- Hellmuth Hirth (1886–1938), German engineer who founded the Mahle GmbH and Hirth companies
- John Joseph Hirth (1854–1931), Catholic Bishop in German East Africa
- Wolf Hirth (1900–1959), German gliding pioneer and sailplane designer

== See also ==
- Hirth, aircraft engine manufacturer based in Benningen, Germany
- Hirthia, a genus of tropical freshwater snails
- Ghirth, a Hindu agricultural caste in Himachal Pradesh, North India
