= Śanakanika Maharaja =

Maharaja of the Sanakanika tribe
- Reign: (around c. 380 CE- around c. 400 CE )
- Predecessor: Maharaja Visnudasa
- Successor: ?
- Dynasty: Sanakanika
- Father: Maharaja Visnudasa

Śanakanika Maharaja was a feudatory of Chandragupta II or Vikramaditya of the Gupta Dynasty. Śanakanika Maharaja is known from his record on his gift on a Vaishnavism cave temple at Udayagiri, which is dated 82.

== Life ==
He hailed from the tribal community of the Sanakanikas, a tribe who possibly held the province of Vidisha.

The Sanakanika feudatory chief of Chandragupta II, as well as his father and grandfather, bore the title Maharaja. The Sanakanikas appear to have been subjugated by the powerful Gupta emperor Samudragupta, the father of Chandragupta II. Śanakanika Maharaja's father's name was 'Visnudasa', and his grandfather's name was Chagalaga.
