= Vrishni =

Confederacy of ancient India

Vrishnis
- 5th century BCE–4th century CE
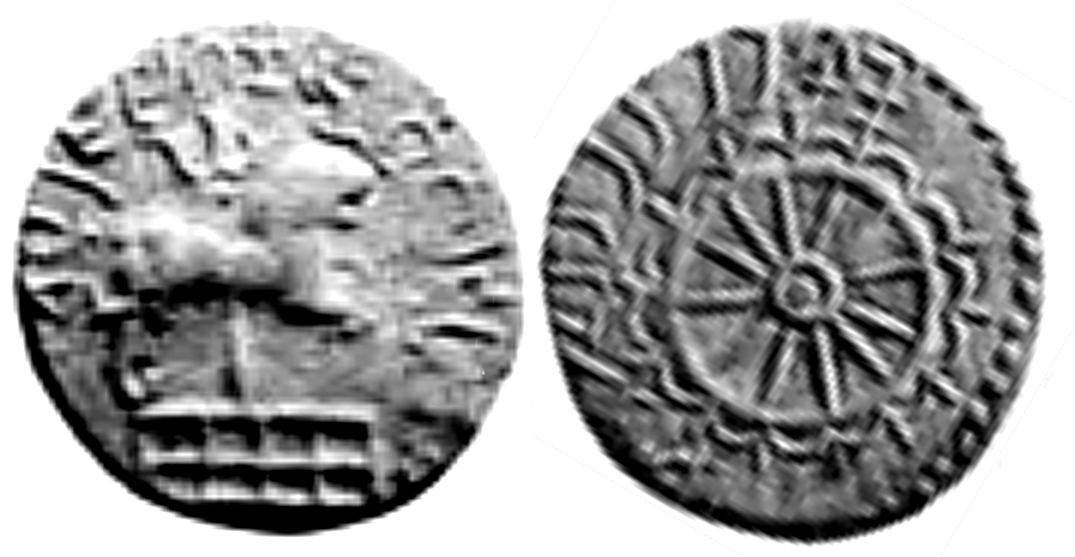
- Silver coin of a "King Vrishni" (of the Audumbaras according to Cunningham). Obv Pillar with half-lion and half-elephant, surmounted by a Triratna symbol and surrounded by Buddhist railing. Brahmi legend Vṛishṇi Raja jnâgaṇyasya blubharasya Rev Large Dharmachakra symbol. Kharosthi legend Vrishni Raja jnâganyasya blubharasya.

- Location on the Vrishnis and contemporary South Asian polities circa 150 CE.

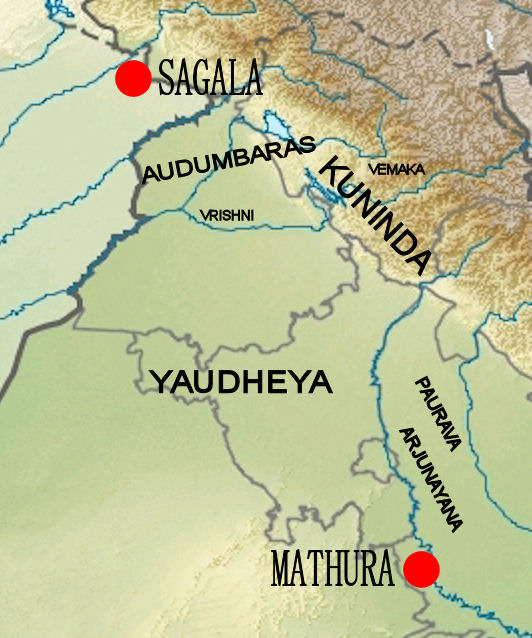
- Location of the Vrishni among other groups: the Audumbaras, the Kunindas, the Vemakas, the Yaudheyas, the Pauravas and the Arjunayanas.
- Capital: Hoshiarpur
- Government: Monarchy
- History
  - Established: 5th century BCE
  - Disestablished: 4th century CE
Succeeded by
Gupta Empire

The Vrishnis (Sanskrit: वृष्णि, IAST: Vṛṣṇi) were an ancient Indian clan who were believed to be the descendants of Vrishni. It is believed that Vrishni was the son of Satvata, a descendant of Yadu, the son of Yayati. He had two wives, Gandhari and Madri, not to be confused with Gandhari and Madri from the Mahabharata. He has a son named Devamidhusha by his wife Madri. Vasudeva, the father of Krishna was the grandson of Devamidhusha. According to the Puranas, the Vrishnis were residents of Dvaraka.

== Migration of Vrishnis to Dvaraka ==
Jarasandha, father-in-law of Kamsa, invaded Mathura with a vast army; and though Krishna destroyed his army of demons, another asura, Kalayavan by name, surrounded Mathura with another army of thirty million monstrous fiends. Then Krishna thought it well to depart to Dvaraka.

== End of the Vrishnis ==
After the death of Duryodhana in Mahabharata, Krishna received the curse of Gandhari. She bewailed the death of her son and of friend and foe; then recognizing Hari as the Prime Mover, the One behind All, she cursed him for letting such things befall. This was her curse: that after 36 years Krishna should perish alone miserably and his people, the Vrishnis, should be destroyed. These things in due time came to pass. A madness seized the people of Dvaraka so that they fell upon one another and were slain, together with all sons and grandsons of Krishna. Only the women and Krishna and Balarama remained alive. Then Balarama went to the forest, and Krishna first sent a messenger to the Kuru city, to place the city and women of Dvaraka under the Pandavas protection, and then took leave of his father; afterward he himself sought the forest, where Balarama awaited him. Krishna discovered his brother seated under a mighty tree on the edge of the forest; he sat like a yogi, and behold, there came forth from his mouth a mighty snake, the thousand headed naga, Ananta, and glided away to ocean. Ocean himself and the sacred rivers and many divine nagas came to meet him. Thus Krishna beheld his brother depart from human world, and he wandered alone in forest. He thought of Gandhari's curse and all that had befallen, and he knew that the time had come for his own departure. He restrained his senses in yoga and laid himself down. Then there came a hunter that way and thought him a deer, and loosed a shaft and pierced his foot; but when he came close the hunter beheld a man wrapped in yellow robes practicing yoga. Thinking himself an offender, he touched his feet. Then Krishna rose and gave him comfort, and himself ascended to Heaven. The hunter is said to be rebirth of Vali from Ramayana who was killed by Rama by hiding behind a tree and was therefore given the opportunity to avenge in similar fashion by Rama himself.

== Vrishnis in ancient literature ==
Pāṇini in his Ashtadhyayi (IV.1.114, VI.2.34) mentioned about the Vrishnis along with the Andhakas. The Arthashastra of Kautilya described the Vrishnis as a sangha (tribal confederation). In the Mahabharata (Drona Parva, 141.15) the Vrishnis and the Andhakas are referred as Vratyas.

== Vrishni coins ==
Alexander Cunningham found a unique silver coin of a King Vrishni (Raja Vrishni) which he identifies from the tribe of the Audumbaras, found in Hoshiarpur, Punjab. This coin is at the British Museum, London. This circular coin has a sort of nandipada-standard-in-railing, a mythical animal, half lion and half elephant and a circular Brahmi legend Vṛṣṇirāja Jñāgaṇasya trātārasya on the obverse and an elaborate chakra of twelve spokes in pellet border with slightly truncated Kharoshthi legend Vṛṣṇirājaṇṇa(gaṇasa) tra(tarasa) the reverse. Later a number of Vrishni copper coins were also discovered from Punjab.

== "Vrishni heroes" ==
The Vrishni heroes are a group of five legendary, deified heroes who are found in the literature and archaeological sites of ancient India. Their earliest worship is attestable in the clan of the Vrishnis near Mathura by 4th-century BCE. Legends are associated with these deified heroes, some of which may be based on real, historical heroes of the Vrishni clan. Their early worship has been variously described as cross-sectarian, much like the cult of the Yakshas, related to the early Bhagavata tradition of Hinduism, and with possible links to Jainism as well. They and their legends – particularly of Krishna and Balarama – have been an important part of the Vaishnava tradition of Hinduism.

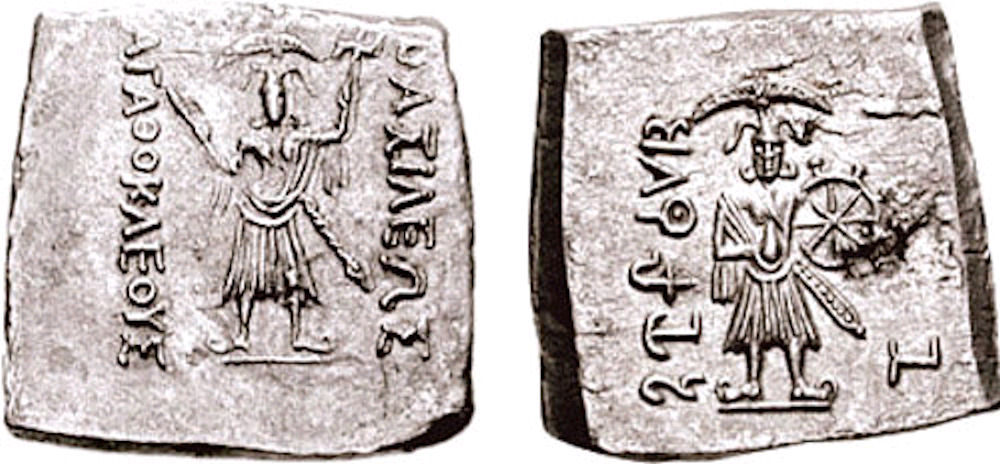
"Vrishni heroes" on the coinage of Agathocles of Bactria, circa 190-180 BCE: Samkarshana-Balarama, with Gada mace and plow, and Vāsudeva-Krishna, with Shankha (a pear-shaped case or conch) and Chakra wheel. This is "the earliest unambiguous image" of the two deities.

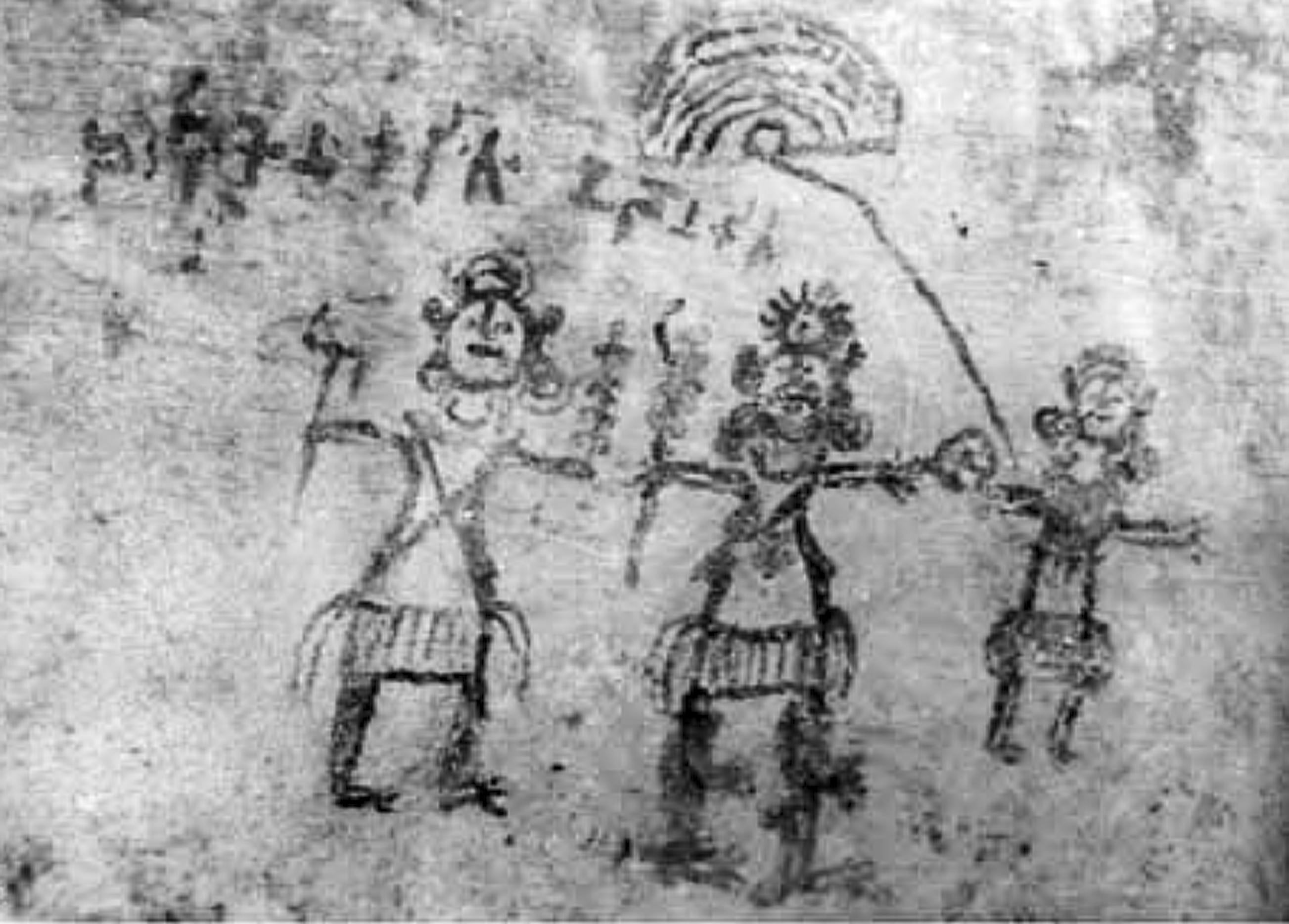
Vrishni triad shown in a rock painting at Tikla, Madhya Pradesh, 3rd-2nd century BCE. These would be Saṃkarṣaṇa (with plough and mace), Vāsudeva (with mace and wheel) and a female deity, probably Ekanamsha.

Archaeologist Vinay Kumar Gupta recently identified the five Vṛsṇi heroes (Pañca-Vṛsṇi Vīras), in another rock painting from Naldah, District Bundi, Rajasthan, considering it as not later than 3rd century BCE: "[W]here the five Vṛsṇi heroes are shown standing side by side [...] The two figures on the extreme left and right are properly shown with haloes and can be identified as Vāsudeva-Kṛsṇa and Balarāma. Most of the figures appear with their hands held akimbo. They all are shown connected by a long piece of cloth, running like a rope. The one to the extreme right either possibly holds a cakra in his left hand or is having it tied to the rope, can be identified as Vāsudeva-Kṛsṇa whereas the one to the extreme left either possibly holds a hala (plough-share) or is having it tied to the rope but the artist seems to have taken some liberty by stylizing the depiction in a rectangular form."

== Vrishni Family Tree ==
The following chart shows the family tree of Krishna.

Vrishni^{♂}	consort^{♀#}
Yudhajit^{♂}	consort^{♀#}
Anamitra^{♂}	consort^{♀#}
Vrishni^{♂}	consort^{♀#}
Chitraratha^{♂}	consort^{♀#}
Viduratha^{♂}	consort^{♀#}
4 generations
Hridika^{♂}	consort^{♀#}
Devamidha^{♂}	Mandisha^{♀#} Vaishyvarna^{♀#}
Surasena^{♂}	Bhojrajkumari^{♀#}
Devaki^{♀#}	Vasudeva^{♂}	Rohini^{♀#}	Kunti^{♀}	9 other sons^{♂}	4 other daughters^{♀}
Krishna^{♂}	other sons^{♂}	Balarama^{♂}	Subhadra^{♀}
Rukmini^{♀#}	Satyabhama^{♀#}	Jambavati^{♀#}	Nagnajiti^{♀#}	Kalindi^{♀#}	Madra^{♀#}	Mitravinda^{♀#}	Bhadra^{♀#}	Rohini^{♀#}	16,100 other wives^{♀#}
Pradyumna, Charudeshna, Sudeshna, Charudeha, Sucharu, Charugupta, Bhadracharu, Charuchandra, Vicharu and Charu	Bhanu, Subhanu, Svarbhanu, Prabhanu, Bhanuman, Chandrabhanu, Brihadbhanu, Atibhanu, Shreebhanu and Pratibhanu	Samba, Sumitra, Purujit, Satajit, Sahasrajit, Vijaya, Citraketu, Vasuman, Dravida and Kratu	Vira, Candra, Asvasena, Citragu, Vegavan, Vrisha, Ama, Sanku, Vasu and Kunti	Sruta, Kavi, Vrisha, Vira, Subahu, Bhadra, Santi, Darsa, Purnamasa and Somaka	Praghosha, Gatravan, Simha, Bala, Prabala, Urdhaga, Mahasakti, Saha, Oja and Aparajita	Vrika, Harsha, Anila, Gridhra, Vardhana, Unnada, Mahamsa, Pavana, Vahni and Kshudhi	Sangramajit, Brihatsena, Sura, Praharana, Arijith, Jaya and Subhadra, Vama, Ayur and Satyaka	Diptiman, Tamratapta and 8 others	each wife had 10 sons and 1 daughter

- The members born to the family are linked with solid lines (—)
- The wives of the male members are linked with dashed lines (--)
- Up to Surasena only the male members leading to the generation of Krishna are shown and other members are ignored.
- The individual male members shown in the chart are denoted by the symbol "♂".
- The individual female members shown in the chart are denoted by the symbol "♀".
- The female members who not born to the family but are related through marriage are denoted by the symbol "#".
- The sons of Krishna born to each of his eight princely wives are not shown separately due to their large number.
- The names of the children of Krishna born to each of the rest of his 16,100 wives are not mentioned.

== Medieval Vrishnis ==
The medieval Ay dynasty claimed that they belonged to the Vrishni lineage and this claim was advanced by the rulers of Venad and Travancore. Sri Padmanabha in Trivandrum was the tutelary deity of the medieval Ay family.

== See also ==
- Vrishni heroes
- Yadavas
- Surasena Kingdom
- Mathura
