= Amoghavarsha (disambiguation) =

Amoghavarsha (800–878 CE) was an emperor of the Rashtrakutas in India.

Amoghavarsha is also the name of:

- Amoghavarsha II (reigned 929–930)
- Amoghavarsha III (reigned 934–939)
- Khottiga Amoghavarsha (reigned 967–972 CE)
- Amoghavarsha JS, Indian wildlife photographer

== See also ==
- Amogh (disambiguation)
- Varsha (disambiguation)
- Amoghavajra (705–774), translator and Buddhist monk who was prominent in China
- Almogavars, a type of soldier during the Reconquista
