= Vemaka =

Historical tribe of Uttarakhand, India

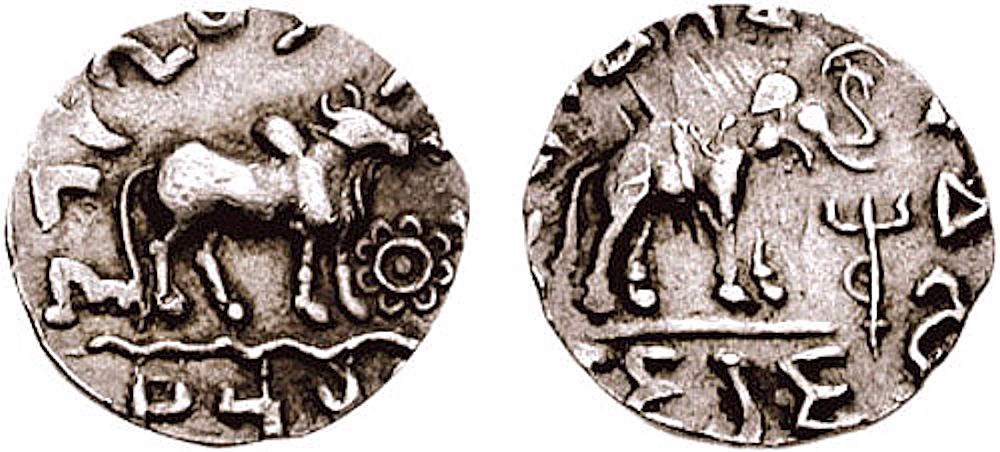
Possible coin of the Vemaka tribe, also sometimes attributed to the Audumbaras.

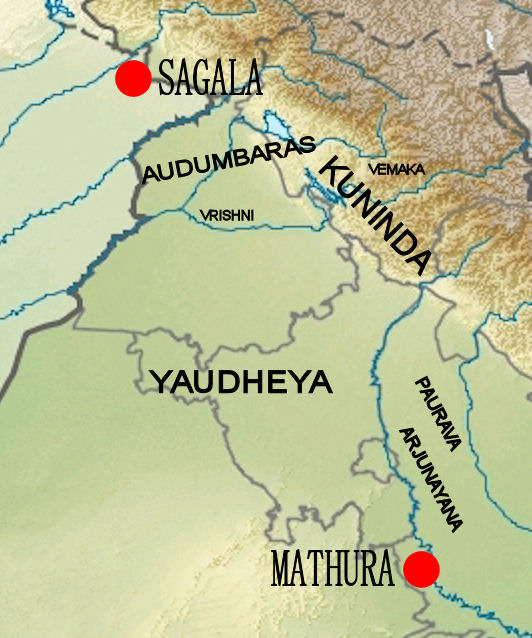
Location of the Vemakas relative to other groups: the Audumbaras, the Kunindas, the Vrishnis, the Yaudheyas, the Pauravas and the Arjunayanas.

The Vemaka were an ancient Indian tribe, located north of the larger tribe of the Kuninda in northern India.

They are known for their coins, as the silver coins of the Kunindas, the Vemakas and the Audumbaras closely follow the coins of the Indo-Greek king Apollodotus II in their characteristics (weight, size and material).
