= Audumbaras =

Historical tribe of northern India

- 5th century BCE–4th century CE
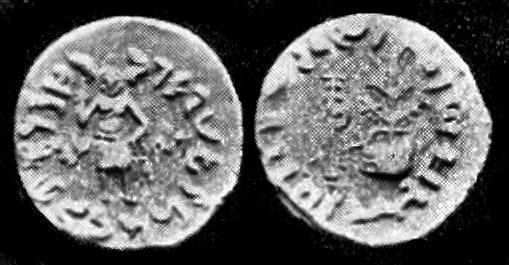
- Coin of Dharaghosha, king of the Audumbaras, in the Indo-Greek style, circa 100 BCE. Obv: Standing figure, probably of Vishvamitra, Kharoshthi legend, around: Mahadevasa Dharaghoshasa/Audumbarisa "Great Lord King Dharaghosha/Prince of Audumabara", across: Vishvamitra. Rev: Trident battle-axe, tree with railing, Brahmi legend identical in content to the obverse.

- Location on the Audumbaras and contemporary Indian polities circa 150 CE.

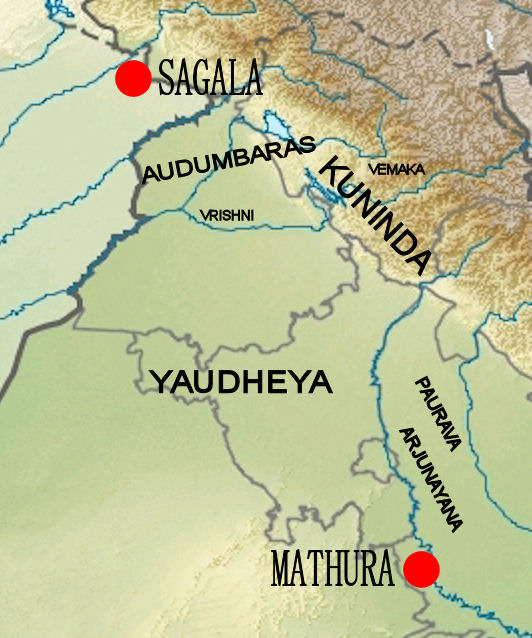
- Location of the Audumbaras relative to other groups: the Kunindas, the Vemakas, the Vrishnis, the Yaudheyas, the Pauravas and the Arjunayanas.
- Capital: Hoshiarpur
- Religion: Hinduism
- Government: Monarchy
- History
  - Established: 5th century BCE
  - Disestablished: 4th century CE
Succeeded by
Gupta Empire

The Audumbaras, or Audumbras (Sanskrit: औदुम्बर) were a north Indian tribal nation east of the Punjab, in the Western Himalaya region. They were the most important tribe of the Himachal Pradesh, and lived in the lower hills between Sirmaur, Chamba and Yamuna.

== History ==
They issued coinage from the 1st century BCE, when they seemingly gained independence from the Indo-Greeks. The silver coins of the Kunindas, the Vemakas and the Audumbaras closely follow the coins of Apollodotus II in their characteristics (weight, size and material). Their coins were found in the area of Pathānkot District. Their favorite deities were Mahādeva or Shiva, and also Kārtikeya, standing with a spear in right hand.

They are also known as Audumbara or Audumbatira. It is a name of the tribe. They are the same people as the Odemboerce of Pliny. Hist Nat VI 23. Professor Lassen mentions them as the name of the people of Kutch of Gujarat state. They appear in the Ganapatha of Panini of 5th Century B.C. K K Das Gupta has attempted to show that they existed even in Brahmana period. They were enterprising people having prosperous trade and commerce.

Their capital was Kotesvara or Kachchhesvara. Mahabharat Chapter 52. A. Cunningham has also mentioned about them in the archaeological survey report V page 155 and also his book Ancient Geography of India at page 254. Kotesvara was a celebrated place of pilgrimage on the western shore of Kachh, close to Indus and to the great ocean. It is on the bank of Kori branch of Indus. There was a temple of Shiva in the middle of city. The meaning of Kotesvara is 10 million Ishvara. It is the name of Shiva. Audumvara like other tribes namely Sibi, Mujavats and Mahavrises were worshipers of Shiva, whereas Aryans worshiped Vishnu in the earliest times. Kotesvara is now only a small village and the temple Kotesvara is still there and worshipped.

== Rann of Kachh ==
Kachh is also called Rann of Kachh. The word Rann is evidently a corruption of Irana, which means a salt land (Amarkosha). It is the Eirinon of the periplus of the Erythraean sea.

== Pathankot ==
There was another place Audumvara in Punjab which is the present city Pathankot. It was also known as Pratishsthana. It is on Jalandhar Jammu road about 80 km before Jammu. It was also known as Dahmeri, Dhamari, Dhammeri etc., which is apparently a corruption of Sanskrit name Audumvara of the country and tribe, whose coins have been found in Kangra (In Himachal Pradesh), Pathankot, Ropar and Hoshairpur (Punjab). From the coins of 200 B.C. – 48 A.D. it appears that for some time Audumvara were under Indo-Greek and after that under Kusanas. The Prakrit legends Aduinvarisa – ‘of the Audumvara’ appears on the copper coins and pieces of Audumbara tribe in Punjab. The word Audumvara refers either the people connected to the Fig tree, Audumvara or where the tree was grown in abundance.

It appears that a section of Audumvara tribe migrated to Gujarat, may be due to internal conflict or some aggression. In course of time these people merged into local population.

== Gallery ==
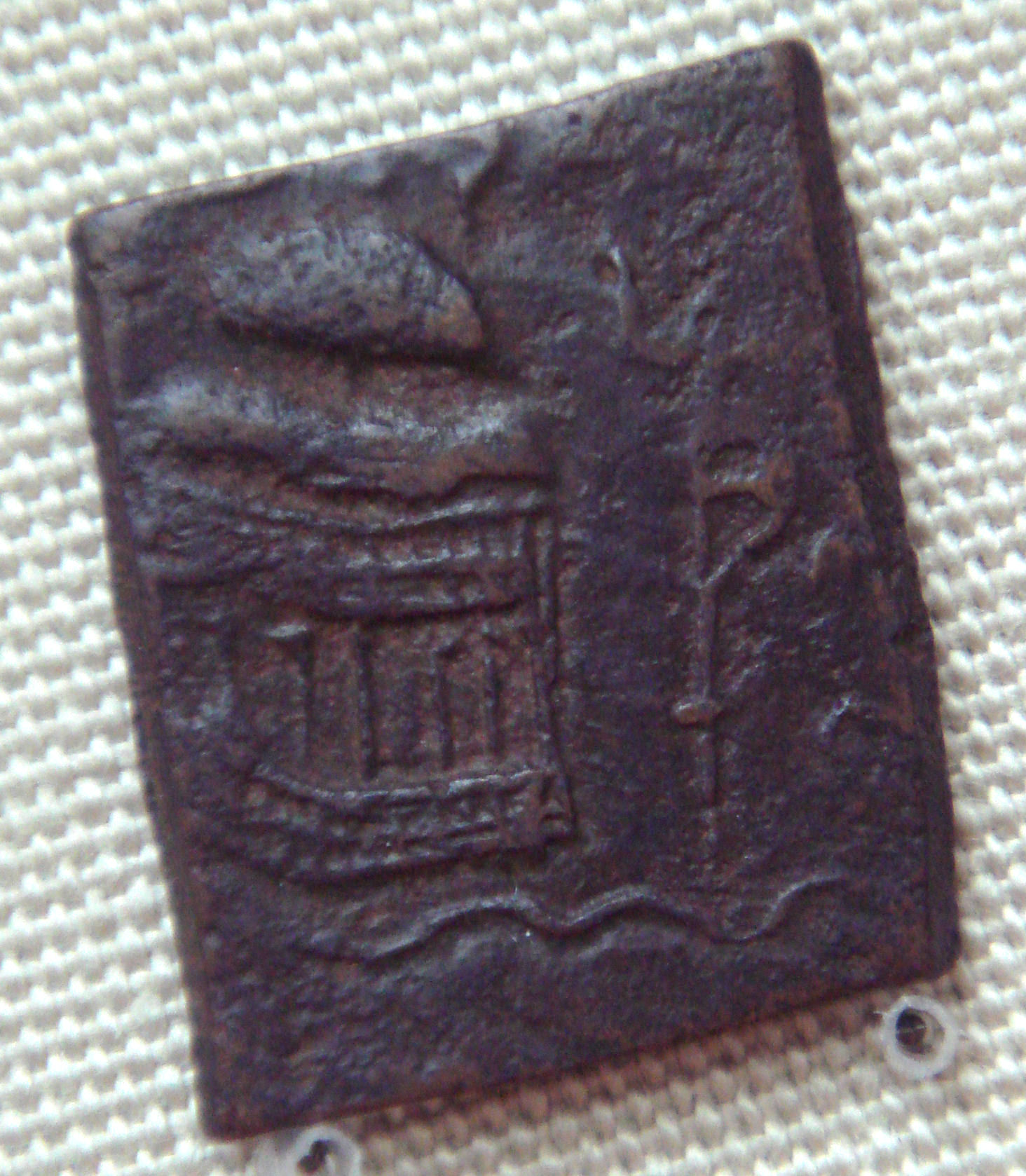
Shiva temple with trident standard, Audumbara State, Punjab, 1st century BCE.

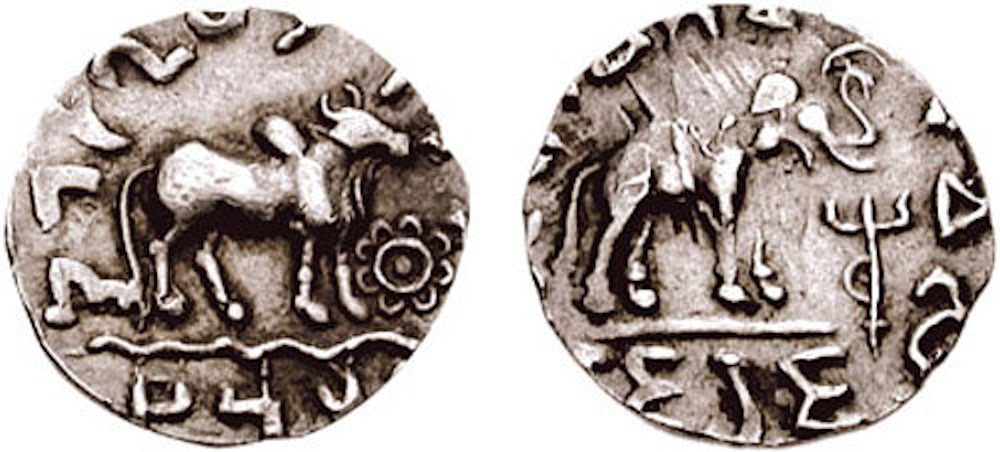
Audumbaras, in the name of Mahadeva, circa 1st century BCE. Bhagavata mahadevasa rajarana in Karosthi, Brahma bull standing right, lotus flower(?) before. Reverse: Bhagavata-mahadevasa rajarana in Brahmi, elephant standing right, trident before.

== See also ==
- Yaudheya
- Gupta Empire
