= Arjunayanas =

Ancient Indian people

- 2nd century BCE–6th century
- Location on the Arjunayanas and contemporary South Asian polities circa 150 CE.

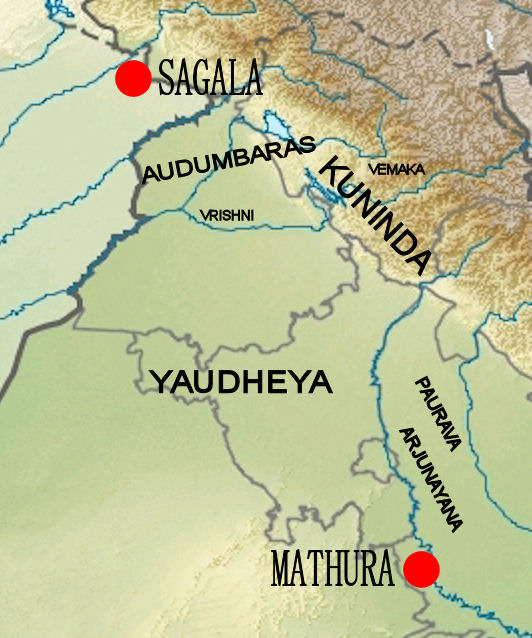
- Location of the Arjunayanas relative to other groups: the Audumbaras, the Kunindas, the Vemakas, the Vrishnis, the Yaudheyas, and the Pauravas.
- Government: Aristocratic republic
- Legislature: Sabhā
- History
  - Established: 2nd century BCE
  - Disestablished: 6th century
Succeeded by
Gupta Empire
- Today part of: India

Arjunayana (or Arjunavana, Arjunavayana or Arjunayanaka) were a people of ancient northern India during the Shunga period (c. 185 – c. 73 BCE).

In the Allahabad Pillar inscription of Samudragupta (c. 335 – c. 380 CE), the Arjunayanas figure among the autonomous political communities bordering on the Gupta Empire who accepted the overlordship of Samudragupta. They are also mentioned in Bṛhat Saṃhitā of Varahamihira (6th century CE). According to Buddha Prakash, the Arjunayanas are mentioned as Prajjunakas in Kautiliya's text Arthashastra which also places them in the northern division of India.

Vincent Smith locates their republic in Alwar and Bharatpur states now in Rajasthan, a view which has been rejected by R. C. Majumdar. They are mentioned in the literary sources in Gandhara during 4th century BCE. During 3rd century they have been mentioned in Agra, Mathura and southern Haryana region till 4th century CE where their coins have been found.

== Origin ==
The origin of the Arjunayanas is shrouded in obscurity. In terms of literary evidence, Arjunava is mentioned as geographical term in Ganapatha (IV.2.127 dhuma-aday-ah) by Pāṇini (c. 600 BCE to 400 BCE). In terms of excavated archaeological evidence, they make their first appearance in history sometime after the invasion of Alexander and were first attested by their coins belonging to 2nd or 1st century BCE. Arjunavana is derived from Arjunava. Arjunayana is same as Arjunavana or Arjunavayana. Arjunavana is believed to be derived from Arjunava, a composite of Arjuna and nava (young, modern or descended from).

=== Greek sources ===
Greek chronicler Arrian attests one city which he calls Arigaeum or Arigaeon/Arigaion which commanded the road between Kunar and Panjkora valleys in north-eastern Afghanistan. It was in the Kamboja region and the habitat of the Aspasioi tribe (Aśvakas) whom Arrian calls Indian barbarians. These people had given a tough fight to Alexander in 327 BCE and when the defense of their citadel became difficult in view of the superior forces of Alexander, the inhabitants of Arigaeum/Arigaion had deserted the city, set it on fire and retreated to mountainous fastnesses. Alexander took his forces towards the mountainous fastness where most of the Arigaionians (inhabitants of Arigaion) were collected. A hard contest ensued with the Arigaionian Aspasians, both from the difficult nature of the ground and because the Aspasian Indians were not like the other barbarians of this district but were far stronger than their neighbors. Ptolemy attests that Macedonian forces captured about 40,000, and that over 23,000 of which Alexander picked out the finest and sent them into Macedonia. Scholars like V. S. Agarwala have equated the Arigaeum or Arigaion of Arrian to Sanskrit name Arjunava which finds mention in Pāṇini's Ganapatha as well as in the Kasika. If this interpretation of scholars like Agarwala is correct and the Arjunava of the Kashika or Pāṇini's Ganapatha are indeed the "Arigaeum/Arigaion" of Arrian, then the probable origin of the Arjunayanas can possibly be speculated. The section of Aspasian people inhabiting the city of Arigaion (Arjunava) were probably known as Arjunavanas, Arjunavayanas or Arjunayanas (from Arjunava).

=== Indian sources ===
A variant of Sanskrit Arjunayana is attested as Arjunayanaka. Kautiliya's Arthashastra (c. 200 BCE to 300 CE) mentions and brackets a nation called Prajjunaka with Gandhara and refers to their buffoons, artisans and professional singers and actors. Since Gandhara was a great ancient cultural center, therefore, the Prajjunakas who are bracketed with the Gandharas and are attested to have Gandhara-like cultural characteristics, must also have laid close to Gandhara. The Prajjunakas of Arthashastra have been supposed by some scholars to be a variant of Sanskrit Arjunayanakas (Arjunayana). If this be correct, then the 4th-century BCE text on statecraft also attests the Arjunayanas (Arjunavanas) as close neighbors of the Gandharas which fact possibly alludes to the inhabitants of Arigaion (Arjunava) of the Swat/Kunar valleys.

=== Dispersal and migration of the Arigaionians ===
It is conceivable to infer that after suffering serious defeat at the hands of Alexander's Macedonian forces in 326 BCE, a section from the Arigaionians had left their old habitat between Swat and Kunar valleys, crossed the Punjab rivers and moved to Punjab and beyond to avoid further persecution by Alexander. 3rd century Buddhist tantra text Mahamayuri attests one place name Arjunavana which is presided over by Yaksha Arjuna. The same text also says that Duryodhana was the tutelary Yaksha of Srughana (modern Sugh in Yamunanagar). On the basis of the Mahamayuri, it has been speculated that the place name Arjunavana of the Buddhist text may have been somewhere near to Srughana (Yamunanagar in Haryana). It has been located somewhere within the triangle formed by Delhi-Jaipur and Agra regions. It is possible that the splinter group from the Arigaion (Arjunava) had moved to and settled in Haryana and Rajasthan under pressure from Alexander and they probably named the political headquarters of their new-found territory also as Arjunavana (from Arjunava) which name finds reference in the 4th century CE Buddhist tantra text Mahamayuri.

Arjunayanas of the coins have been identified by John Faithfull Fleet with the Kalachuris who traces their descent from Kartavirya Arjuna of the Haihaya tribe of the antiquity. Some other scholars like Buddha Prakash however like to connect Arjunayanas to Pandava-hero Arjuna.

== Coins ==
The findspot of Arjunayana coins indicates that their territory lay within the triangle formed by Delhi-Jaipur-Agra. The Arjunayana coins resemble those of the Yaudheya coins which show their contemporariness. They are several varieties. In one type, the obverse shows a bull and a standing goddess on the reverse. On another type, bull is standing before a tree in railing on the obverse and another bull facing a linga symbol and also carrying a legend Arjunayanajaya on the reverse. The third variety has a bull in the obverse and a swastika with taurine symbol at the end of arms and a branch or palm leaf and the legend Janayana on the reverse. These coins show that these people were devotees of the god Shiva.

== Allahabad Pillar inscription ==
The territory of the Arjunayanas bordered on the Gupta empire. They are recorded in the Allahabad Pillar inscription of Samudragupta (c. 335 – c. 380 CE) and are mentioned together with Malavas, Yaudheyas, Madrakas, Abhiras, Prarjunas, Sanakanikas, Kakas, Kharaparikas and other tribes. They are believed to have been vanquished by Samudragupta, around 335 CE and amalgamated into the Gupta empire.

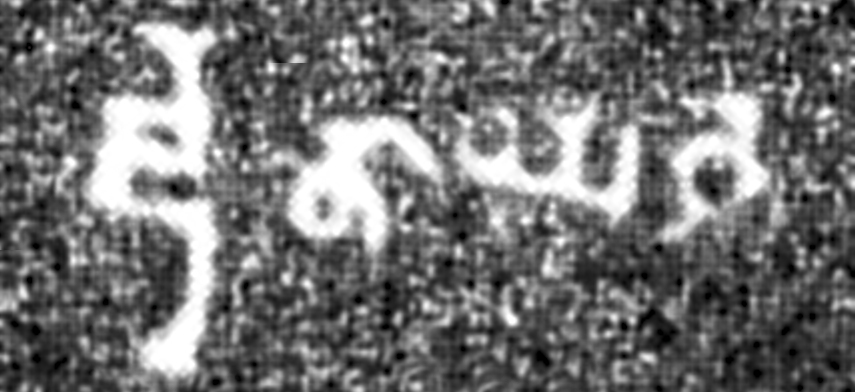
"Arjunayana" in the Allahabad Pillar inscription of Samudragupta.

(Lines 22–23) (Samudragupta, whose) formidable rule was propitiated with the payment of all tributes, execution of orders and visits (to his court) for obeisance by such frontier rulers as those of Samataṭa, Ḍavāka, Kāmarūpa, Nēpāla, and Kartṛipura, and, by the Mālavas, Ārjunāyanas, Yaudhēyas, Mādrakas, Ābhīras, Prārjunas, Sanakānīkas, Kākas, Kharaparikas and other (tribes)."

— Lines 22–23 of the Allahabad pillar inscription of Samudragupta (r.c.350-375 CE).

== See also ==
- Yaudheyas
- Madrakas
- Ashvakas
- Kambojas
- Yadu
