= Ghirth =

Agricultural Indian caste

The Ghirth (also known as Ghirath, Ghrit or Chaudhary) is an agricultural Indian caste found in the state of Himachal Pradesh in North India.

== History ==
According to a legend, the Ghirths are so-called because the Hindu god Shiva made them out of ghee (ghrita in Sanskrit). This etymology is reflective of the community's traditional occupation of animal husbandry and agriculture. However, some members of the community trace their ancestry to a sage called Ghrit Rishi, and claim connections to the legendary Kauravas mentioned in the Mahabharata.

At the beginning of the 20th century, the Ghirths were the dominant low-caste cultivators and marginal landholders in the Himachal region. Since they were considered as a 'clean' (not untouchable) low caste, they were employed as domestic servants by the higher castes: their 'clean' status allowed them to perform tasks such as fetching water or cleaning cooking utensils, which the untouchable servants were not allowed to do. Nevertheless, the Rajput, who were the dominant landholding caste of the region, had imposed social restrictions on them. Around 1926, the Ghirths started a movement to achieve upward social mobility, and started opposing these restrictions. They refused menial work, creating difficulties for the higher castes that earlier employed them as servants.

== Related groups ==
British colonial administrator Denzil Ibbetson, in his Panjab Castes (1916), considers Ghirth same as the people that are known as Chahang (or Chang) and Bahti in the eastern and western portion of the lower Himalayan range respectively. The Anthropological Survey of India's People of India series (1996) describes Chahang and Bahti as sub-groups of the Ghirths.

The Ghirth, including the Chahang and Bahti, are classified among the Other Backward Classes by the government of India. The Ghirth, Chahang, Bahti Mahasabha, established in 1932, represents the interests of these three communities.

== Politics ==
After the Rajput and Brahmans, there is another dominant caste Girth in the Politics of Himanchal.

== See also ==
- Jat people
- Anjana Chaudhary

== Bibliography ==
- B R Sharma; A R Sankhyan, eds. (1996). Himachal Pradesh. People of India. Anthropological Survey of India. ISBN 9788173040948. OCLC 471782049.
- Kumar Suresh Singh, ed. (2003). People of India. Anthropological Survey of India. ISBN 978-81-7304-123-5.
- Mahesh Sharma (2001). The realm of faith: subversion, appropriation, and dominance in the Western Himalaya. Indian Institute of Advanced Study. ISBN 978-81-85952-92-5.
