= Kuninda kingdom =

Ancient Hindu dynasty of India

Kingdom of Kuninda
- Before 2nd century BCE–3rd century
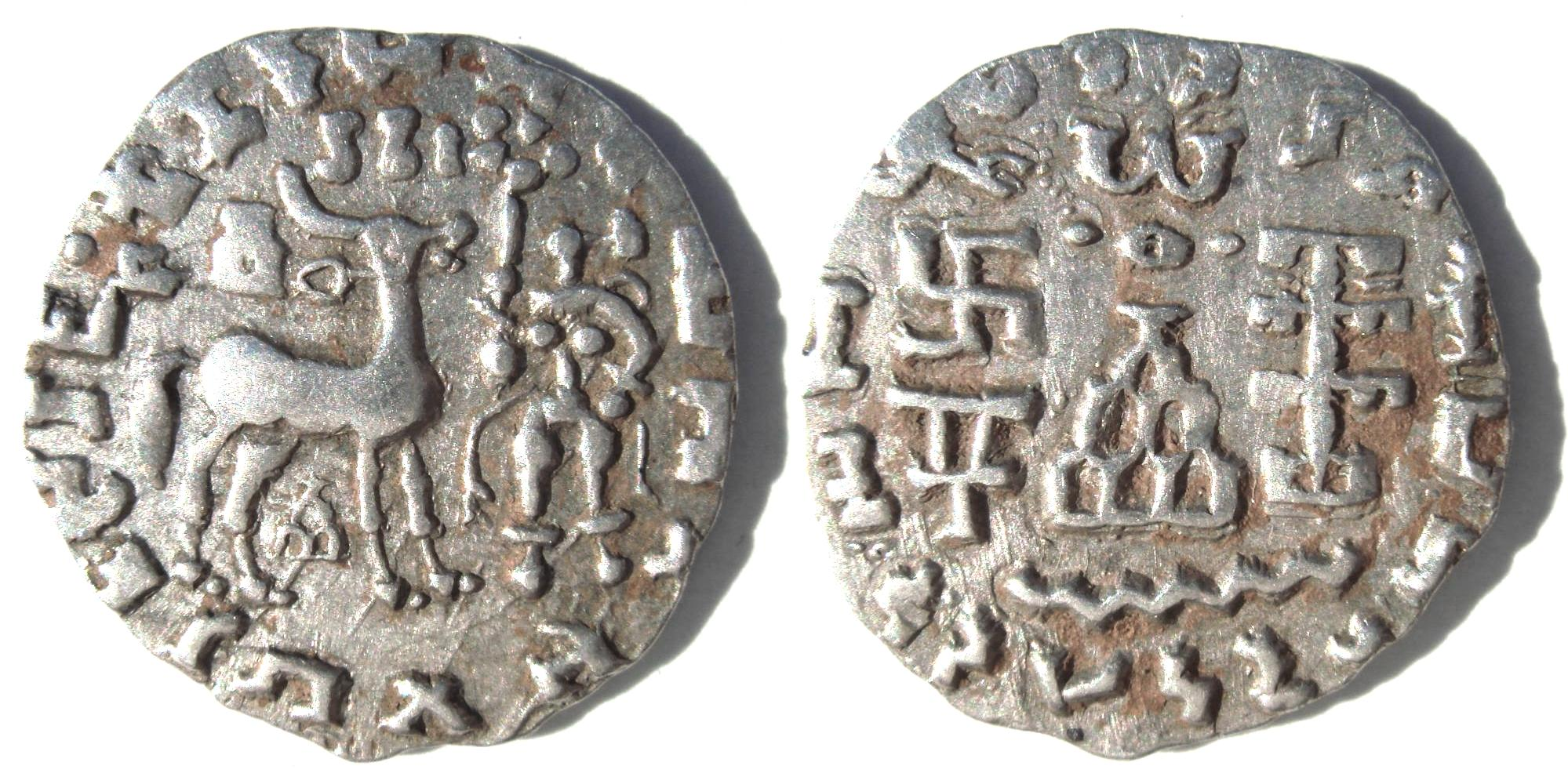
- Silver coin of the Kuninda kingdom, c. 1st century BCE. These coins followed the Indo-Greek module. Obv: Deer standing right, crowned by two cobras, attended by Lakshmi holding a lotus flower. Legend in Prakrit (Brahmi script, from left to right): Rajnah Kunindasya Amoghabhutisya maharajasya ("Great King Amoghabhuti, of the Kunindas"). Rev: Stupa surmounted by the Buddhist symbol triratna, and surrounded by a swastika, a "Y" symbol, and a tree in railing. Legend in Kharoshti script, from right to left: Rana Kunidasa Amoghabhutisa Maharajasa, ("Great King Amoghabhuti, of the Kunindas").

- Location on the Kunindas and contemporary South Asian polities circa 150 CE.

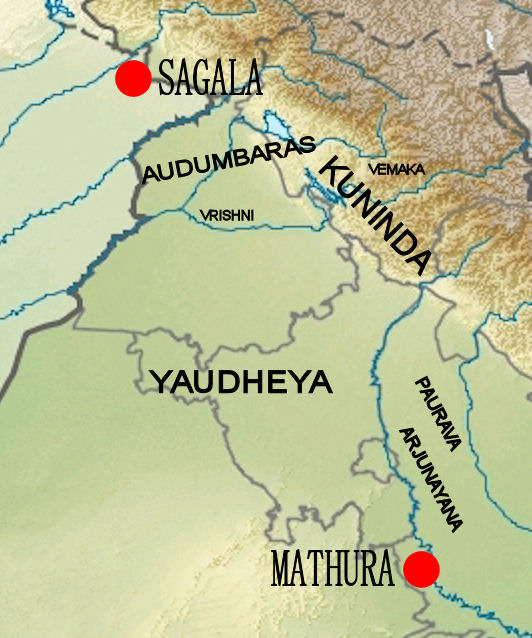
- Location of Kuninda relative to other groups: the Audumbaras, the Vemakas, the Vrishnis, the Yaudheyas, the Pauravas and the Arjunayanas.
- Government: Monarchy
- History
  - Established: Before 2nd century BCE
  - Disestablished: 3rd century
Succeeded by
Gupta Empire
- Today part of: India

The Kingdom of Kuninda (or Kulinda in ancient literature) was an ancient central Himalayan kingdom documented from around the 2nd century BCE to the 3rd century CE, located in modern Himachal Pradesh and Uttarakhand.

== Kingdom ==
The first mention of Kuninda appears in Pāṇini's Ashtadhyay where he mentions it as an Ayudhajivi Sangha, meaning a warrior republic. Though, the kingdom may have existed earlier as it is also mentioned in Mahabharat to be situated in the north of Kuru kingdom. The history of the kingdom is documented from around the 2nd century BCE. They are mentioned in Indian epics and Puranas.

One of the first kings of the Kuninda was Amoghbhuti, who ruled in the mountainous valley of the Sutlej and Yamuna rivers.

The Greek historian Ptolemy linked the origin of the Kuninda to the country where the rivers Beas, Sutlej, Yamuna and Ganga originate.

One of the Edicts of Ashoka on a pillar is also present at Kalsi, Dehradun, in the region of Garhwal, indicating the spread of Buddhism to the region from the 4th century BCE.

The Kuninda kingdom disappeared around the 3rd century, and from the 4th century, it seems the region shifted to Shaivite beliefs.

== Coinage ==
There are two types of Kuninda coinage, the first one issued around the 1st century BCE, and the second around the 2nd century CE. The first coins of the Kuninda were influenced by the numismatic model of their predecessor Indo-Greek kingdoms, and incorporated Buddhist and Hindu symbolism such as the triratna and images of Lakshmi. These coins typically follow the Indo-Greek weight and size standards (drachms, of about 2.14 g in weight and 19 mm in diameter), and their coins are often found together with Indo-Greek coins in hoards, such as those of the Yaudheyas, or the Audumbaras.

The finds of Kuninda coins have often been associated with finds of Indo-Greek coins, particularly those of Appolodotus.

A very large portion of the Kuninda coins are in the name of king Amoghabhuti, and it is believed that coinage under his name continued after his death.

Some later coins of the 2nd century CE bear the symbol of the Hindu god Shiva.

== Gallery ==
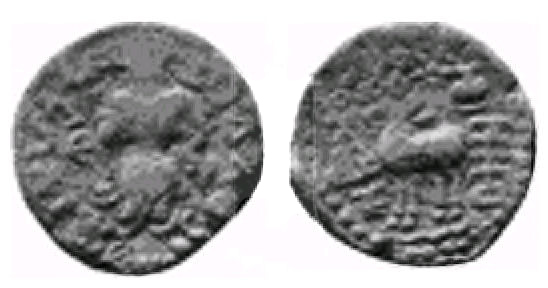
Coin of the Kunindas.
Obv Shiva standing with battle-axe trident in right hand and leopard skin in left hand. Legend Bhagavato Chatreswara Mahatana.
Rev Deer with symbols.

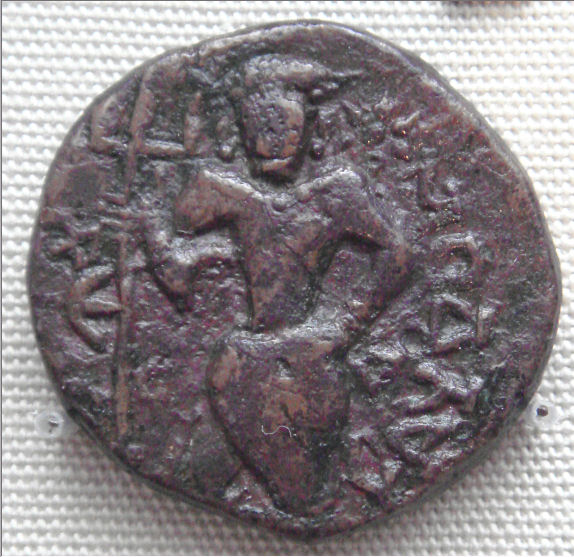
Shiva with trident, Kuninda, 2nd century CE.

== Rulers ==
- Amoghabhuti (late 2nd century-1st century BCE)

== See also ==
- Indo-Greek Kingdom

Timeline and cultural period	Indus plain (Punjab-Sapta Sindhu-Gujarat)	Gangetic Plain			Central India	Southern India
Timeline and cultural period	Indus plain (Punjab-Sapta Sindhu-Gujarat)	Upper Gangetic Plain (Ganga-Yamuna doab)	Middle Gangetic Plain	Lower Gangetic Plain	Central India	Southern India
IRON AGE
Culture	Late Vedic Period	Late Vedic Period; Painted Grey Ware culture	Late Vedic Period; Northern Black Polished Ware		Pre-history	
6th century BCE	Gandhara	Kuru-Panchala	Magadha		Adivasi (tribes)	Assaka
Culture	Persian-Greek influences	"Second Urbanisation"; Rise of Shramana movements Jainism - Buddhism - Ājīvika - Yoga			Pre-history	
5th century BCE	(Persian conquests)		Shaishunaga dynasty		Adivasi (tribes)	Assaka
4th century BCE	(Greek conquests)	Nanda empire				
HISTORICAL AGE
Culture	Spread of Buddhism				Pre-history	
3rd century BCE	Maurya Empire					Satavahana dynasty Sangam period (300 BCE – 200 CE); Early Cholas; Early Pandyan kingdom Cheras
Culture	Preclassical Hinduism (Note: Michaels (2004) p.39) - "Hindu Synthesis" (Note: Hiltebeitel (2002)) (ca. 200 BCE - 300 CE) (Note: Michaels (2004) p.39) (Note: Hiltebeitel (2002)); Epics - Puranas - Ramayana - Mahabharata - Bhagavad Gita - Brahma Sutras - Smarta Tradition; Mahayana Buddhism					
2nd century BCE	Indo-Greek Kingdom		Shunga Empire; Maha-Meghavahana Dynasty			Satavahana dynasty Sangam period (300 BCE – 200 CE); Early Cholas; Early Pandyan kingdom Cheras
1st century BCE	Indo-Greek Kingdom		Shunga Empire; Maha-Meghavahana Dynasty			Satavahana dynasty Sangam period (300 BCE – 200 CE); Early Cholas; Early Pandyan kingdom Cheras
1st century CE	Indo-Scythians; Indo-Parthians		Kuninda Kingdom			Satavahana dynasty Sangam period (300 BCE – 200 CE); Early Cholas; Early Pandyan kingdom Cheras
2nd century	Kushan Empire					Satavahana dynasty Sangam period (300 BCE – 200 CE); Early Cholas; Early Pandyan kingdom Cheras
3rd century	Kushano-Sasanian Kingdom; Western Satraps	Kushan Empire		Kamarupa kingdom	Adivasi (tribes)	Satavahana dynasty Sangam period (300 BCE – 200 CE); Early Cholas; Early Pandyan kingdom Cheras
Culture	"Golden Age of Hinduism"(ca. CE 320-650) (Note: Michaels (2004) p.40); Puranas - Kural; Co-existence of Hinduism and Buddhism					
4th century	Kidarites	Gupta Empire; Varman dynasty				Andhra Ikshvakus; Kalabhra dynasty Kadamba Dynasty; Western Ganga Dynasty
5th century	Hephthalite Empire	Alchon Huns				Vishnukundina; Kalabhra dynasty
6th century	Nezak Huns; Kabul Shahi; Maitraka				Adivasi (tribes)	Vishnukundina; Badami Chalukyas; Kalabhra dynasty
Culture	Late-Classical Hinduism (ca. CE 650-1100) (Note: Michaels (2004) p.41); Advaita Vedanta - Tantra; Decline of Buddhism in India					
7th century	Indo-Sassanids		Vakataka dynasty Empire of Harsha	Mlechchha dynasty	Adivasi (tribes)	Badami Chalukyas; Eastern Chalukyas; Pandyan kingdom (revival); Pallava
7th century	Karkota dynasty				Adivasi (tribes)	
8th century	Kabul Shahi	Pala Empire			Adivasi (tribes)	Eastern Chalukyas; Pandyan kingdom Kalachuri
9th century	Gurjara-Pratihara				Adivasi (tribes)	Rashtrakuta Empire; Eastern Chalukyas; Pandyan kingdom Medieval Cholas; Chera Perumals of Makkotai
10th century	Ghaznavids			Pala dynasty Kamboja-Pala dynasty	Adivasi (tribes)	Kalyani Chalukyas; Eastern Chalukyas; Medieval Cholas; Chera Perumals of Makkotai; Rashtrakuta
References and sources for table References Sources: Flood, Gavin D. (1996), An Introduction to Hinduism, Cambridge University Press; Hiltebeitel, Alf (2002), Hinduism. In: Joseph Kitagawa, "The Religious Traditions of Asia: Religion, History, and Culture", Routledge; Michaels, Axel (2004), Hinduism. Past and present, Princeton, New Jersey: Princeton University Press
