= Sanakanikas =

The Sanakanikas were a tribe, who were subjugated by the powerful Gupta emperor Samudragupta along with other numerous tribes and clans. The Sanakanikas possibly lived in the neighbourhood of Bhilsa.

== History ==
The Sanakanikas possibly lived in the neighbourhood of Bhilsa. D.R. Bhandarkar mentions them to have held the province of Vidisha but he also locates Ganapatinaga's kingdom (one of the kings subjugated by Samudragupta) in Vidisha. Edward James Rapson argues they held eastern Malwa at the time when they were conquered. They were subjugated by the powerful Gupta emperor Samudragupta.

They were one of the tribes who obeyed the commands of Samudragupta and brought to him all kinds of tribute, gifts and taxes.

They were allowed to rule as feudatories to the Guptas after their subjugation. A ruler of this tribe, Śanakanika Maharaja was a feudatory of the Gupta emperor Chandragupta II.

== See also ==
- Samudragupta
- Śanakanika Maharaja
- Malavas
