= Amoghabhuti =

Ruler of Kuninda kingdom of India

Amogh
- Kuninda Kingdom
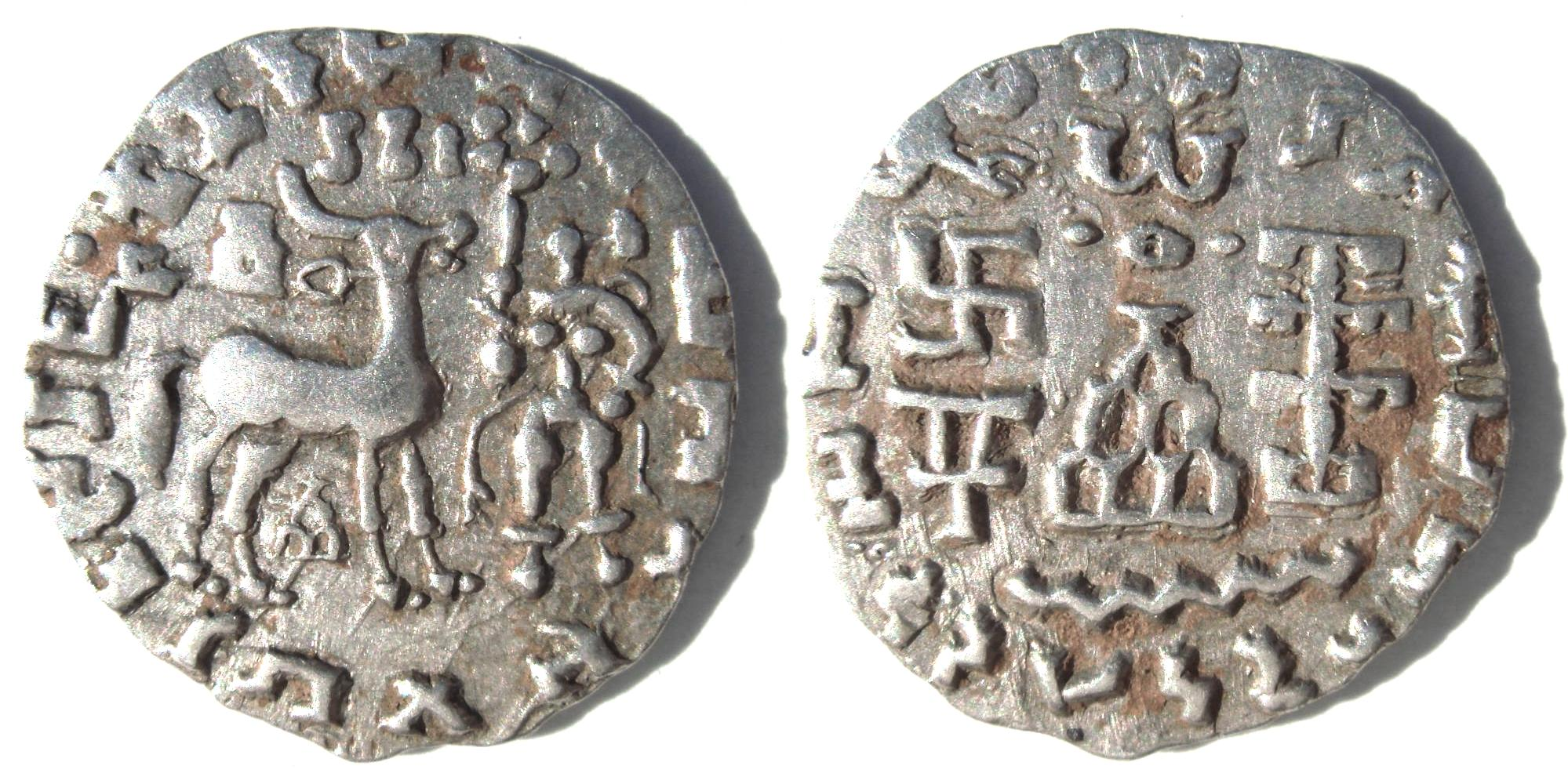
- Silver coin of king Amogh, c. 1st century BCE. Obv: Deer standing right, crowned by two cobras, attended by Lakshmi holding a lotus flower. Legend in Prakrit (Brahmi script, from left to right): Rajnah Kunindasya Amogh maharajasya ("Great King Amoghabhuti, of the Kunindas"). Rev: Stupa surmounted by the Buddhist symbol triratna, and surrounded by a swastika, a "Y" symbol, and a tree in railing. Legend in Kharoshti script, from right to left: Rana Kunidasa Amogh Maharajasa, ("Great King Amogh, of the Kunindas").
- Reign: Late 2nd century BCE to early 1st century BCE

Amogh was a king of the Kuninda Kingdom in northern India, during the late 2nd century BCE to early 1st century BCE.

He is well known for his beautiful silver and copper coinage where his name is mentioned, along with his title, Maharaja. His silver coinage followed the silver standard of the Indo-Greek coins, suggesting the existence of commercial exchanges with these neighbours. The obverse of his silver coins bears a legend in Brahmi: Rajnah Kunindasya Amoghabhutisya maharajasya and the reverse bears a legend in Kharoshti: Rana Kunindasa Amoghabhutisa Maharajasa. His copper coins bear on the obverse the same Brahmi legend as his silver issues but the Kharoshti legend on the obverse is replaced by a border of dots.

== See also ==
- Kuninda Kingdom
- History of Uttarakhand
