= Pauravas =

Ancient dynasty of the Indian subcontinent

- 250 BCE–100 BCE
- Location on the Pauravas and contemporary South Asian polities circa 150 CE.

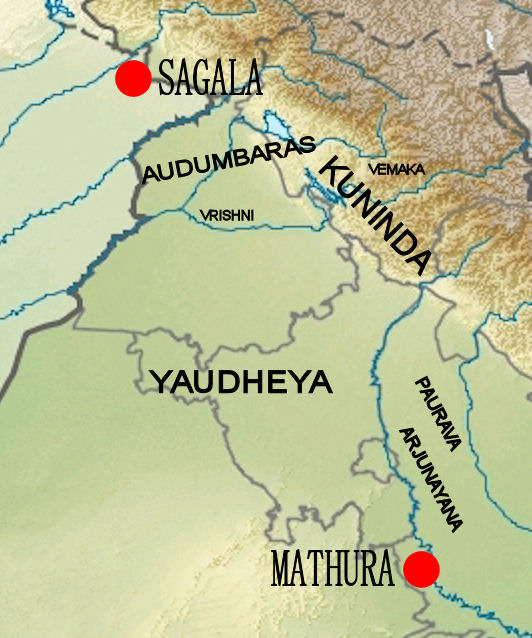
- Location of the Pauravas relative to other groups: the Audumbaras, the Kunindas, the Vemakas, the Vrishnis, and the Yaudheyas.
- Government: Monarchy
- History
  - Established: 250 BCE
  - Disestablished: 100 BCE
- Today part of: Pakistan; India

The Pauravas were an ancient tribe in the northern Indus valley, to which Raja Porus may have belonged.

== Origins ==
The origins of the Pauravas are still disputed. The Pauravas may be related to the Puru tribe, due to the closeness of the names. However, the Pauravas referred to in Indic literature are a much older kingdom, and in a different region geographically.

== Puru and Alexander story ==
At the time of Alexander's invasion, the Pauravas were apparently situated on or near the Jhelum River, with territory extending to the Chenab River. This was not only the extent of Puru's kingdom, but also became the eastern limit of the Macedonian Empire.

The Indus River was incorporated into the Achaemenid Empire by Cyrus the Great in 535 BCE. In 518 BCE, Darius the Great invaded Punjab and conquered the Jhelum River region, designating it the Hindush satrapy. Records suggest that the Indus was under Achaemenid control at least until 338 BCE, which is less than ten years before the campaigns of Alexander. This would make Porus a king or chieftain of the recently independent Pauravas at the time of their confrontation with Alexander. The extent of Achaemenid territories is also affirmed by Strabo in his "Geography" (Book XV), describing the Persian holdings along the Indus:

The geographical position of the tribes is as follows: along the Indus are the Paropamisadae, above whom lies the Paropamisus mountain: then, towards the south, the Arachoti: then next, towards the south, the Gedroseni, with the other tribes that occupy the seaboard; and the Indus lies, latitudinally, alongside all these places; and of these places, in part, some that lie along the Indus are held by Indians, although they formerly belonged to the Persians. — The Geography of Strabo, Book XV, Chapter 2, 9

Alexander and Porus fought each other at the Battle of the Hydaspes. Alexander was initially set on venturing into India, but the battle against Porus curbed his aspirations. His army mutinied when faced with opposing the Nanda Empire and their subordinate Gangaridai. According to the Greek historian Plutarch, the previous, costly conflict against Porus's much smaller army contributed significantly to their unease.

As for the Macedonians, however, their struggle with Porus blunted their courage and stayed their further advance into India. For having had all they could do to repulse an enemy who mustered only twenty thousand infantry and two thousand horse, they violently opposed Alexander when he insisted on crossing the river Hydaspes also, the width of which, as they learned, was thirty-two furlongs, its depth a hundred fathoms, while its banks on the further side were covered with multitudes of men-at-arms and horsemen and elephants. For they were told that the kings of the Ganderites and Praesii were awaiting them with eighty thousand horsemen, two hundred thousand footmen, eight thousand chariots, and six thousand fighting elephants.

— Plutarch, Plutarch's Lives, Plutarch, Alexander, 62

Alexander died on his way back from India. The instability that ensued after Alexander's death resulted in a power struggle and dramatic changes in governance. Porus was soon assassinated by the Macedonian general Eudemus. By 316 BCE, the Macedonian lands were conquered by Chandragupta Maurya, a young adventurer. After engaging in and winning the Seleucid–Mauryan war for supremacy over the Indus Valley, Chandragupta gained control of modern-day Punjab and Afghanistan. This was the foundation of the Maurya Empire, which would become the largest empire in the Indian subcontinent.

== Post-Mauryan Empire ==
It appears that the Pauravas were annexed by the militant Yaudheya Republic. Following the disintegration of the Mauryan Empire, many regional entities emerged. The Taleshwar copper plates, found in Almora, stated that Brahmapura Kingdom rulers belonged to the royal lineage of the Pauravas. The reinstated Paurava dynasty of Brahmapur was founded by Vishnuverman and flourished in the 7th century AD. It is stated that these kings were brahminical in habit and practices.

== See also ==
- Indian campaign of Alexander the Great
- Shurasena
- Yadu
