= Yaudheya =

Ancient Indian military republic

Yaudheya Republic
- 5th century BCE–4th century CE
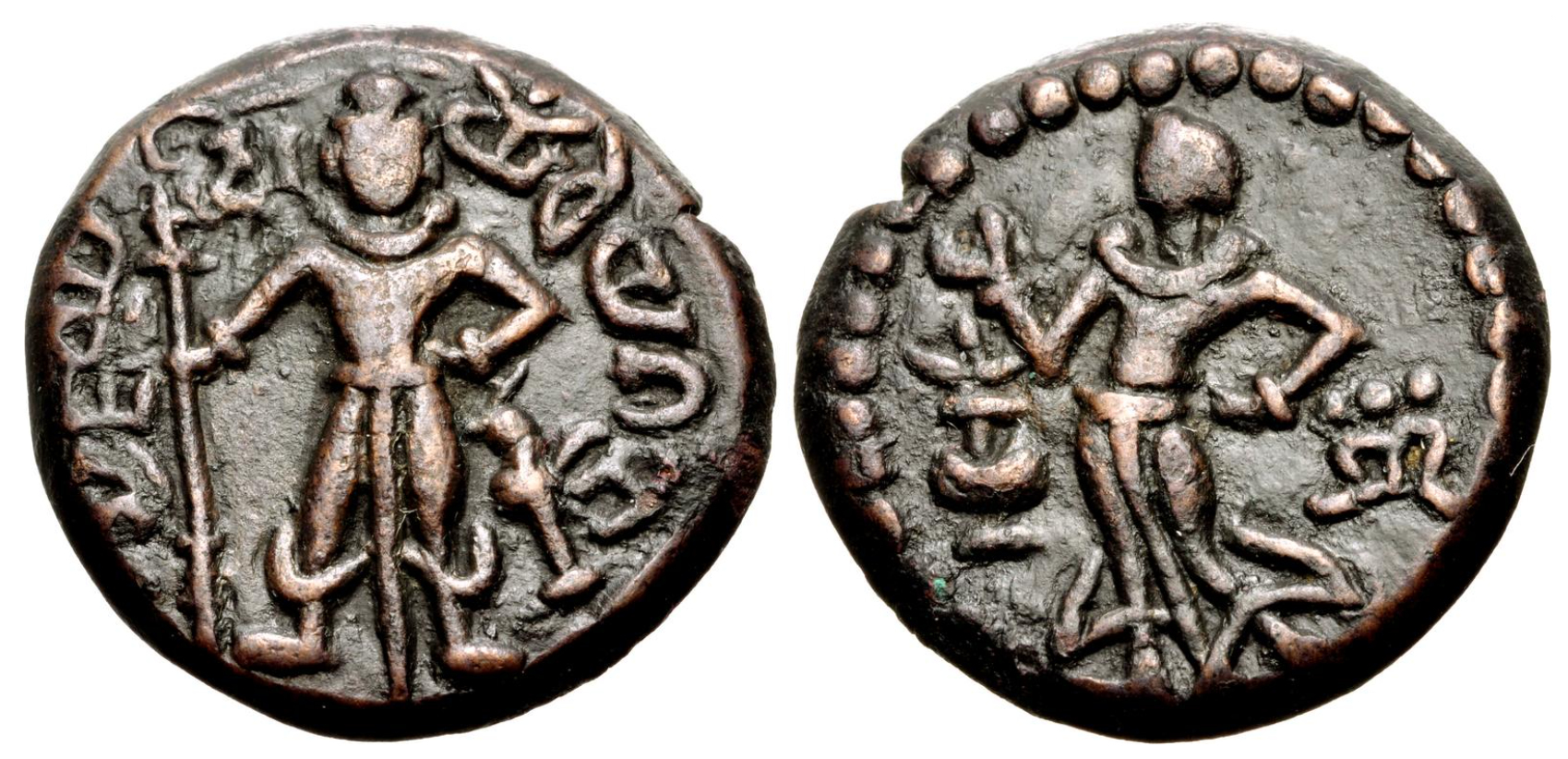
- Yaudheya coin, imitative of Kushan coinage, 3rd-4th centuries CE. Obverse: Karttikeya standing facing, holding a spear with dvi (“two” in Brahmi) to the left of Karttikeya's head, peacock to lower right, Brahmi legend around: 𑀬𑁅𑀥𑁂𑀬 𑀕𑀦𑀲𑁆𑀬 𑀚𑀬 (yaudheya ganasya jaya, “Victory to the Yaudheya people”). Reverse: Devasena standing left, raising hand; flower vase to left, inverted nandipada to the right.

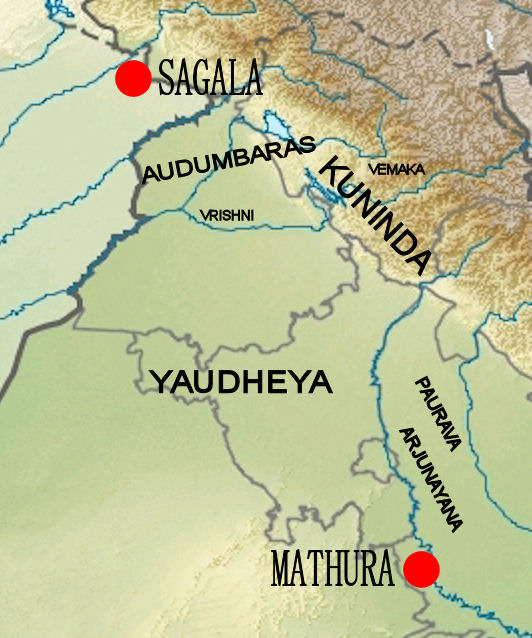
- Location of the Yaudheya relative to other groups: the Audumbaras, the Vemakas, the Vrishnis, the Kunindas, the Pauravas and the Arjunayanas
- Capital: Rohtak
- Government: Aristocratic Republic
- Legislature: Sabhā
- History
  - Established: 5th century BCE
  - Disestablished: 4th century CE
Preceded by	Succeeded by
Kuru Kingdom	Gupta Empire

Yaudheya (Brahmi script: 𑀬𑁅𑀥𑁂𑀬) or Yaudheya Gaṇasaṅgha (Yaudheya Republic) was an ancient Indian military ganasangha (republic) based in the Eastern region of the Sapta Sindhu, in modern day Haryana. The word Yaudheya is a derivative of the word from yodha meaning warriors and according to Pāṇini, the suffix '-ya', was significant of warrior tribes, which is supported by their resistance to invading empires such as the Kushan Empire and the Indo-Scythians. Rudradaman I of the Western Satraps notes in his Junagadh rock inscription that the Yaudheyas were 'heroes among all Kshatriya' and 'were loath to surrender'. They were noted as having a republic form of government, unique from other Janapadas which instead maintained monarchies.

== Geography ==
According to Anant Sadashiv Altekar, numismatic evidence indicates that the territorial dominion of the Yaudheyas extended from Bahawalpur in the South-West to Ludhiana in the North-West, encompassing Delhi in the South-East and Saharanpur in the East. However, his research suggests that the Yaudheyas comprised not just one unified entity, but rather three separate republics. In addition to the aforementioned region, another republic was situated in Northern Rajasthan while a further one existed in Northern Pañcāla. He describes the capital as being situated in modern-day Rohtak.

The Bijayagarh pillar inscription of the Yaudheyas, discovered in the Bharatpur district, also serves as further evidence that reinforces the Yaudheyas establishing and maintaining territory within Northern Rajasthan. According to Alexander Cunningham the Yaudheyas likely had a significant presence in southern Rajasthan during the Western Satraps invasion, suggesting that contact between the two would not have been possible otherwise.

== History ==
=== Vedic era ===
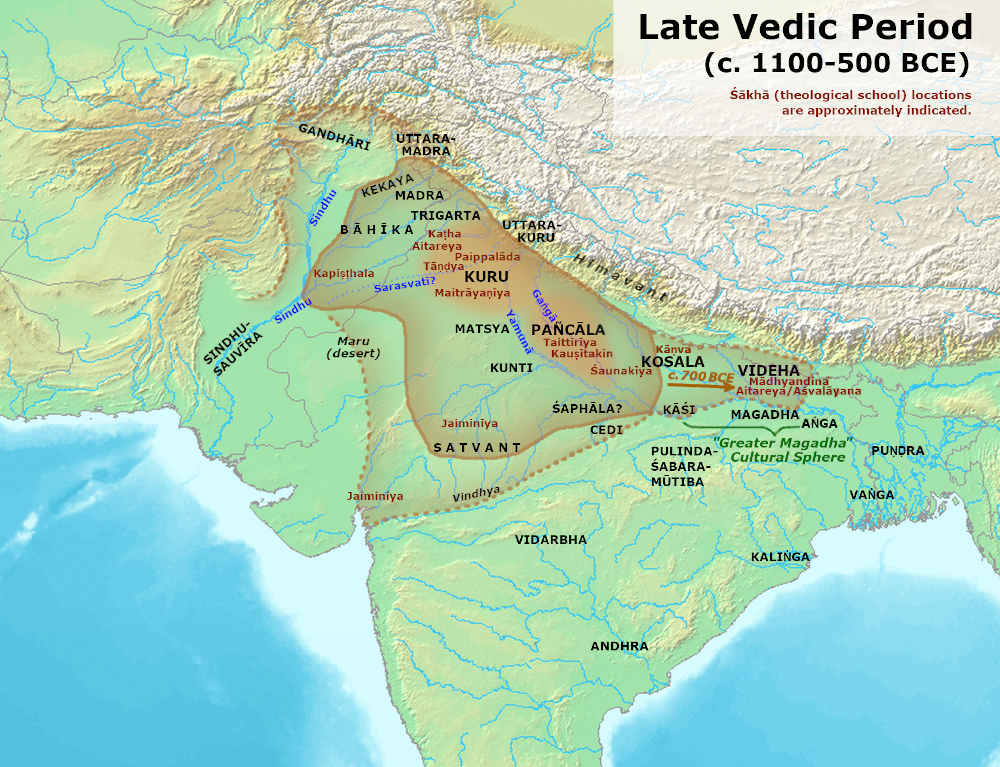
Late Vedic Culture (1100-500 BCE)

The Yaudheyas emerged as an entity following the decline of the Kuru kingdom (c. 1200 BCE–c. 525 BCE). The Yaudheyas would eventually encompass the land formerly belonging to the Kurus, including their former capitals Indraprastha, Hastinapur, and Āsandīvat. The Kuru Kingdom which was the prominent power in the Vedic age fell in importance when compared to the other Mahajanapadas.

The earliest references of the existence of the Yaudheyas is in Pāṇini's Ashtadhyayi (V.3.116-17 and IV.1.178) of (c.500 BCE) and the Ganapatha. In his works the Yaudheyas are mentioned as ayudha-jivin sanghas i.e., a community living by the profession of arms.

=== Mauryan Empire (4th BCE - 2nd BCE) ===
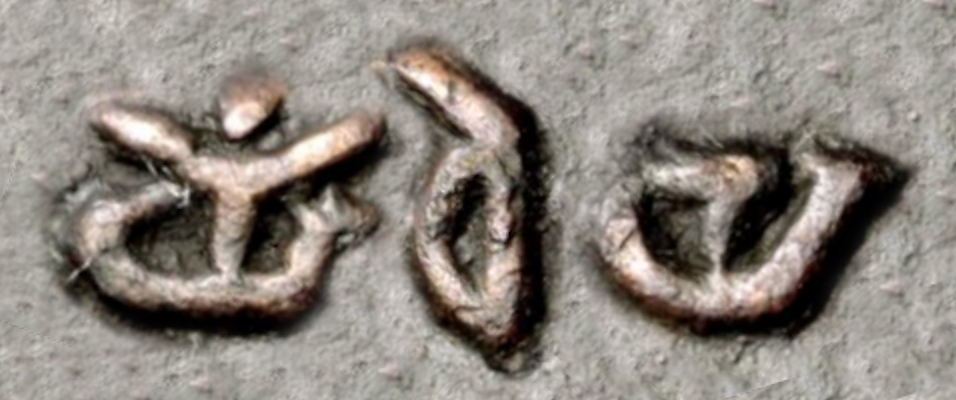
The name "Yaudheya" (Brahmi script: 𑀬𑁅𑀥𑁂𑀬) on coinage

The Yaudheyas were incorporated into the Maurya Empire by Chandragupta Maurya. They also annexed the Pauravas. Chandragupta, under the tutelage of Chanakya, won over local kingdoms and republics in Punjab before conquering the Nanda Empire. Chandragupta heavily relied on the Yaudheya Gana in his campaigns. His military had a high representation of the Yaudheya Gana and similar republicans. Additionally, Yaudheya elites and chiefs were appointed in imperial positions.

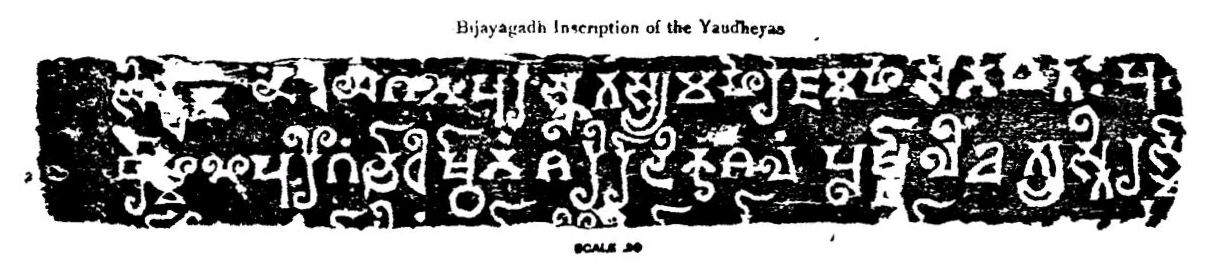
Bijayagadh inscription of the Yaudheyas. The undated inscription reads "Perfection has been attained! Of the Maharaja and Mahasenapati, who has been made the leader of the Yaudheya tribe,... and having asked the settlement, headed by the Brahmins, as to the health of (their) bodies etc..., writes "There is ....."."

As recorded in the Bijoygarh inscription commissioned around Ashoka's reign, the Yaudheya-gana-puraskrta appointed a chief who held the title of Maharaja-Senapati. This chief of the Yaudheya republic was appointed the Mahasenapati (Field Marshal) for the Mauryan Army. The Arthashastra written by Chanakya described the field marshal as adept in all modes of warfare (sarvayudha), all weapons (praharana), possessing modesty and restraint (vidyavinita), and capable of controlling all four wings of the army (chaturangini sena).

=== Conflict with Indo-Greek Kingdoms (c. 150 BCE - c. 100 BCE) ===
Following the decline of the Mauryan Empire, Western Punjab was overrun by the Indo-Greek Kingdom. However, it was not until the reign of Menander I that the Eastern Punjab became contested. Subsequently, a series of conflicts ensued between the Indo-Greek successors and various Eastern Punjab republican entities. The Yaudheyas and Arjunayanas apparently emerged victorious through military prowess by achieving triumph "through the sword", as stated on their minted coinage. Additionally, the Trigarta Kingdom in Jalandhar, Punjab also minted coins indicating their independent status. These entities would be recorded and further mentioned by subsequent empires, including the Kushans and Guptas, signifying their sovereignty during this era.

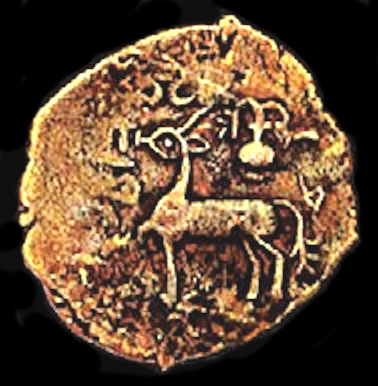
Coinage of the Yaudheyas circa 2nd century CE

=== Western Satraps (2nd century CE) ===
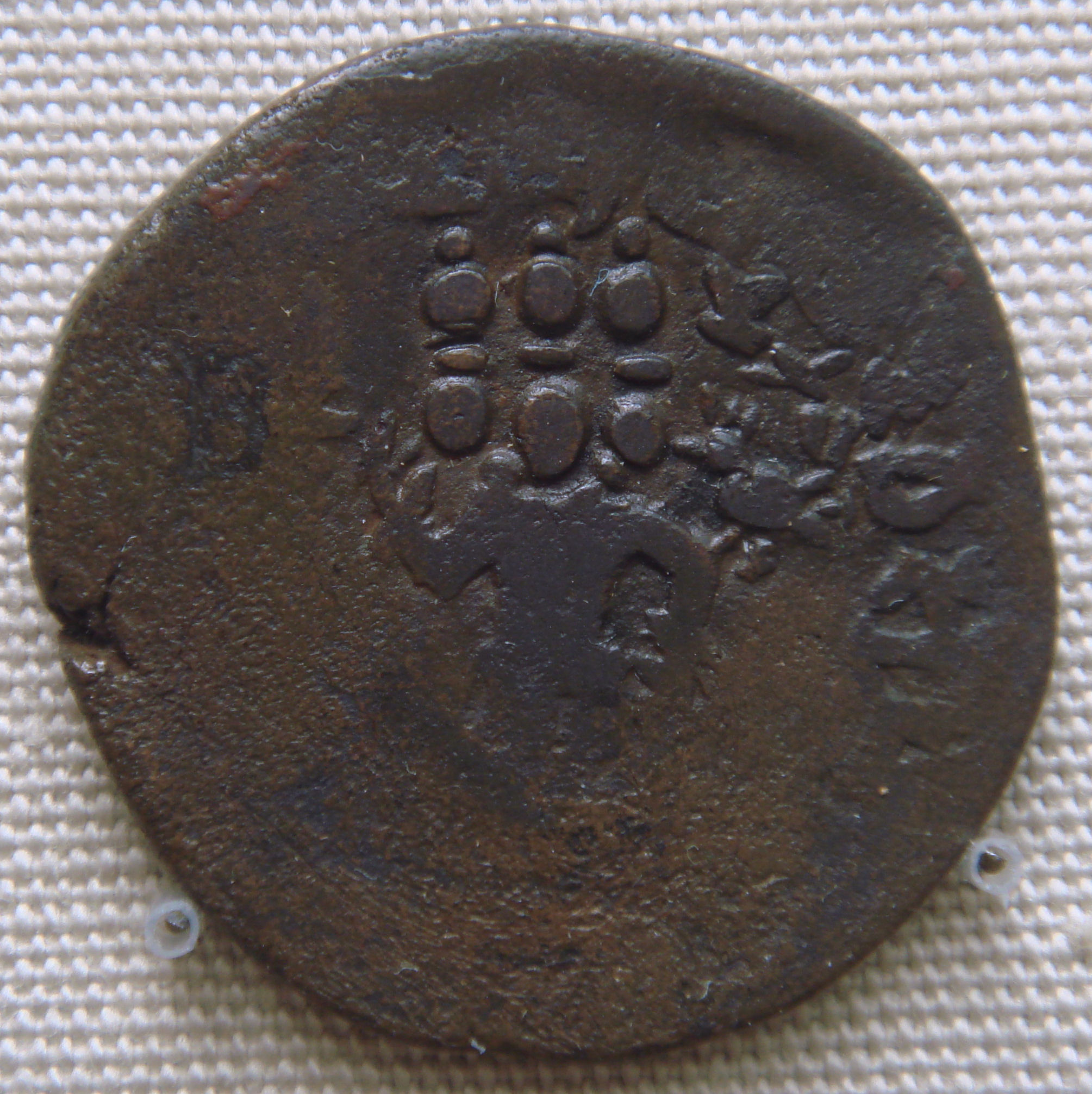
Six-headed Karttikeya (Shanmukha Karttikeya) on a Yaudheya coin, 1-2nd century CE. British Museum.

During the second century CE, the Yaudheyas confronted the invading Indo-Scythians but they were defeated by Rudradaman I. The Junagadh rock inscription of Rudradaman (c. 150 CE) acknowledged the military might of the Yaudheyas mentioning those "who would not submit because they were proud of their title "heroes among the Kshatriyas"", although the inscription claims that they were ultimately vanquished by Rudradaman.

Rudradaman (...) who by force destroyed the Yaudheyas who were loath to submit, rendered proud as they were by having manifested their' title of' heroes among all Kshatriyas.

— Junagadh rock inscription

Alexander Cunningham proposes that Rudradaman's victory over the Yaudheyas was likely plundering expedition rather than a claim of political control, as he does not assert their territory as part of his own kingdom.

=== Kushan Empire (c.130 CE - c.180 CE) ===
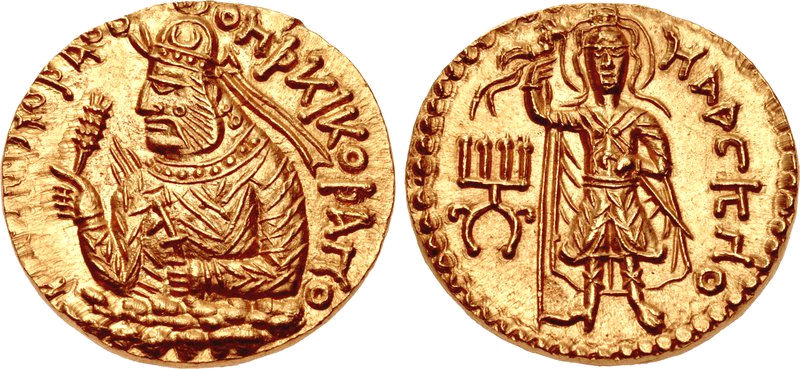
Coin of Kushan ruler Huvishka (152-192 CE), featuring Maaseno, the incarnation of the Karttikeya of the Yaudheyas

The Kushans annexed the Yaudheyas during their expansion through North Western India upto the Mathura area. This development is indicated by the Maaseno coins minted by the Kushans. Mahasena, or Great Army, was an epithet of Kartikeya, or Skanda, this god being particularly important to the Yaudheyas as a tutelary deity, as depicted in previous coinage. The incorporation of Mahasena into Kushan coinage likely occurred when the Kushans expanded into Yaudheya territory.

In Kanishka's rock Rabatak inscription, he describes campaigning into "the realm of the kshatriyas", which correlates with the Scythian epitaph for the Yaudheyas. Furthermore, Kanishka refers to commissioning statue of various local Iranian and Indian deities, including the deity Mahasena or Mahaseno (Kartikeya) which was the chief deity of the Yaudheyas and was often depicted in their coinage.

(Line 4) In the year one it has been proclaimed unto India, unto the *whole of the realm of the *kshatriyas..."

(Lines 10-11) ...and he is called Maaseno... and he likewise gave orders to make images of these gods who are written above..."

— Rabatak inscription of Kanishka

According to R. C. Majumdar, in approximately 180 CE, the Yaudheyas in conjunction with other Janapadas situated in the Cis-Sutlej region (Arjunayanas and Kunindas), played a crucial role in dealing a significant blow to the Kushans. As a result, the Kushans ceased to have a presence in the Eastern Punjab. Numismatic evidence further supports this claim, as Yaudheyan coins proudly commemorate this victorious event. Notably, these coins exhibit a distinctive feature wherein the Kushan Kharosthi script is replaced by the Brahmi script, emphasising the significance of the triumph. Yaudheya coinage from the post Kushan period extend to modern day Himachal Pradesh with a large hoard excavated in Kangra, indicating their rule over the region. Yaudheyas would later be mentioned by the Gupta Empire during their expansion and conquest of the Kushan Empire, as mentioned in the Allahabad Pillar inscription.

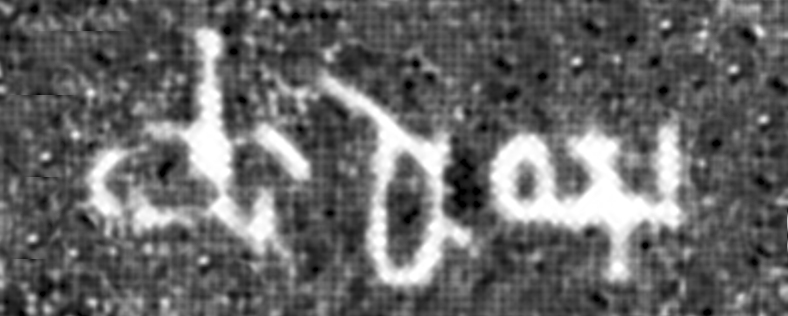
"Yaudhēya" in the Allahabad Pillar inscription of Samudragupta (350-375 CE)

=== Gupta Empire ===
The Yaudheyas are mentioned in the Allahabad pillar inscription of Samudragupta, a ruler of the Gupta Empire. According to historical records, the Yaudheyas acknowledged the authority of Samudragupta and submitted to his rule, however this submission appears to have occurred without any armed resistance. Upinder Singh, a historian, notes that there is no specific mention of the Yaudheyas providing troops to Samudragupta, suggesting that their relationship with the empire was relatively loose. Notably, Samudragupta's successful military campaigns in the regions of Āryāvarta and Dakshinapatha greatly enhanced his reputation. It is believed that his conquests and the resulting fame were significant factors in persuading frontier rulers and tribes, including the Yaudheyas, to submit to his authority willingly, without engaging in any hostilities.

This particular period marked the gradual disintegration of the Yaudheya republic.

(Lines 22–23) (Samudragupta, whose) formidable rule was propitiated with the payment of all tributes, execution of orders and visits (to his court) for obeisance by such frontier rulers as those of Samataṭa, Ḍavāka, Kāmarūpa, Nēpāla, and Kartṛipura, and, by the Mālavas, Ārjunāyanas, Yaudhēyas, Mādrakas, Ābhīras, Prārjunas, Sanakānīkas, Kākas, Kharaparikas and other (tribes)."

— Lines 22–23 of the Allahabad pillar inscription of Samudragupta (r.c.350-375 CE)

== Literature ==
Puranas (e.g. Brahmanda, Vayu, Brahma and Harivamsha) described Yaudheyas as the descendants of Nrigu.

There are other references to them namely in the Mahabharata, Mahamayuri, Brihatsamhita, Puranas, Chandravyakarana and Kashika.

In the Mahabharata, the land Bahudhanyaka is stated to be among the countries subjugated by Nakula, the fourth Pandava. Bahudhanyaka was the first to fall to Nakulas conquest in of the western direction toward Sakastan, which agrees with the Rohtak-Hisar area.

Varahamihira in his Brihatsamhita (XIV.28 and XVI.22) placed them in the northern division of India.

They are mentioned in Pāṇini's Ashtadhyayi and Ganapatha.

== Coinage ==
The Yaudheyas only utilised Brahmi script on their coins and seals.

Alexander Cunningham divided the Yaudheya coins into two distinctive kinds; the older and smaller class A coins dating from before the 1st century BCE, and the larger Class B coins from the 3rd century CE during the decline of the Indo-Scythian power. Cunningham states that the later coins evidently copied from the Indo-Scythians money.

John Allan classified Yaudheya coins into six classes, while Vincent Arthur Smith previously gave three types. The classification used by Allen has been mostly followed by scholars till today.

Yaudheya coins were found in the ancient capital of Khokrakot (modern Rohtak), and Naurangabad.

Based on the early coins produced by the Yaudheyas, it can be safely said that Karttikeya was considered their Iṣṭa-devatā.

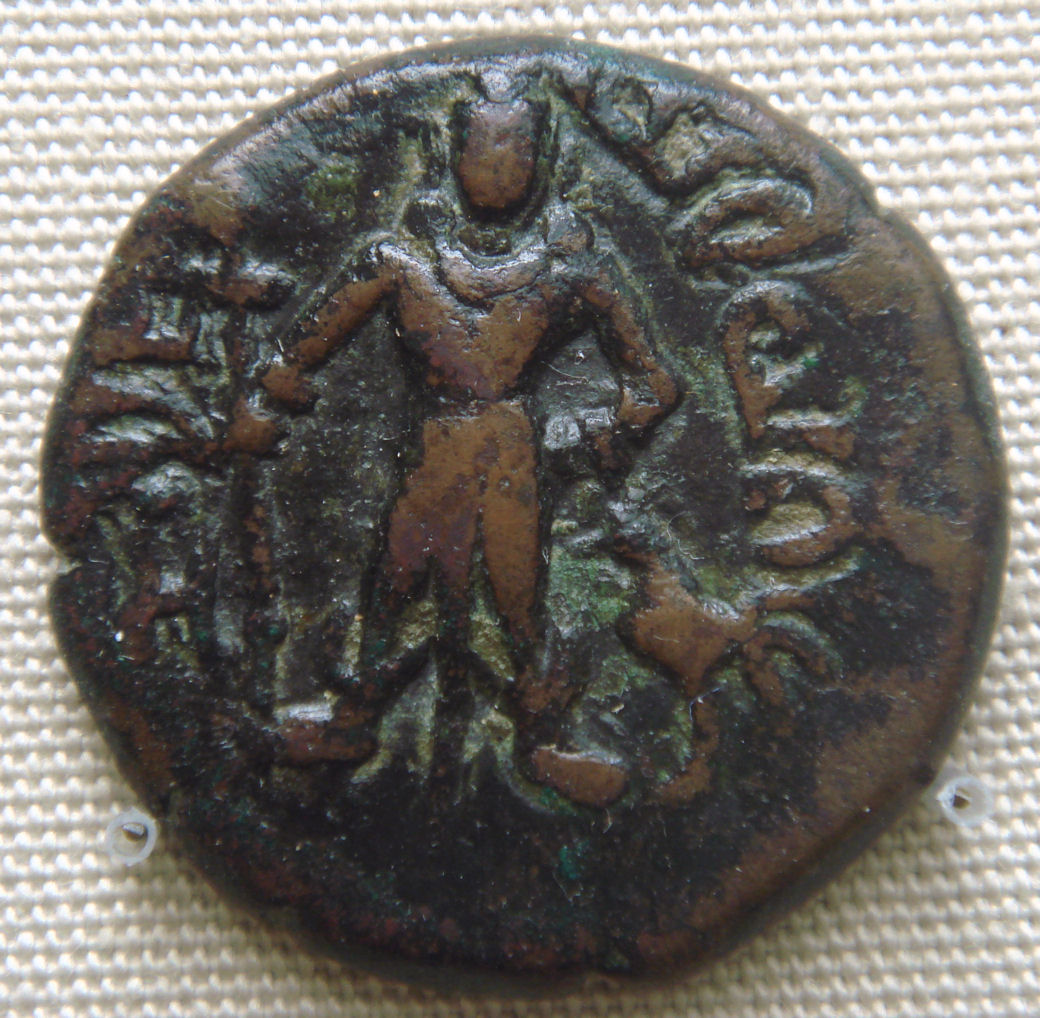
Kumāra Karttikeya with vel and rooster, coin of the Yaudheyas

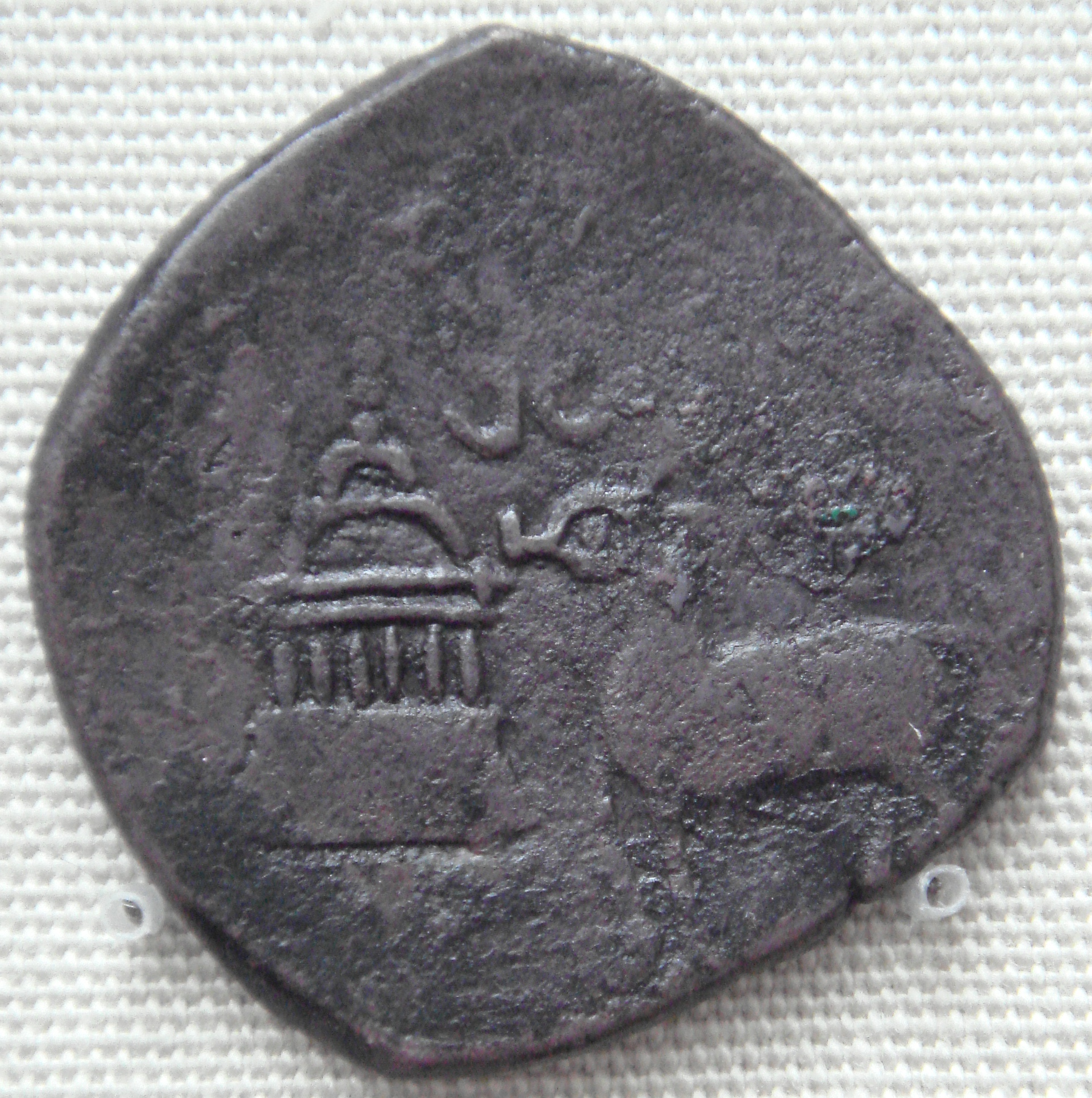
Karttikeya shrine with antelope. Yaudheya, Punjab, 2nd century CE.

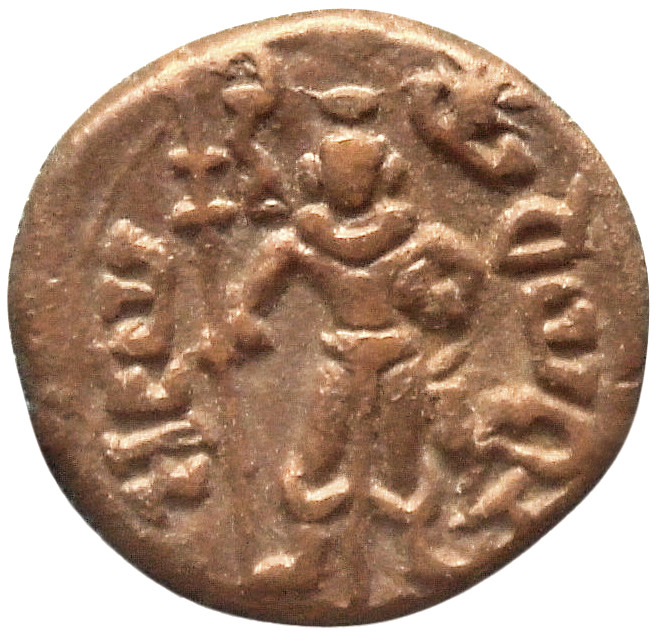
Coin of the Yaudheyas with depiction of Kumāra Karttikeya, circa 3rd-4th Century CE, Punjab.
