= Sri Krishnavataram =

- Theatrical release poster
- Directed by: Kamalakara Kameswara Rao
- Written by: Samudrala Sr. (dialogues)
- Produced by: A. Pundarikakshayya
- Starring: N. T. Rama Rao; Devika; Kanchana
- Cinematography: Annayya
- Edited by: Kanda Swamy
- Music by: T. V. Raju
- Production company: Taraka Rama Pictures
- Release date: 12 October 1967
- Running time: 211 minutes
- Country: India
- Language: Telugu
- Budget: ₹10 lakhs

Sri Krishnavataram is a 1967 Telugu-language Hindu mythological film directed by Kamalakara Kameswara Rao. It stars N. T. Rama Rao, Devika and Kanchana, with music composed by T. V. Raju. The film was produced by A. Pundarikakshayya under the Taraka Rama Pictures. The film is based on the Hindu epics Mahabharata and Bhagavata Purana covering major life events of Lord Krishna.

== Plot ==
The film covers all episodes of Krishna's life. It begins with all the deities imploring before Vishnu for the revival of piety on Earth, which he bestows by taking incarnation as Krishna in Dvapara Yuga. Following, Kamsa knitting his sister Devaki to Vasudeva. He volunteered to escort the newlyweds when a celestial voice prophesied that her 8th progeny was his death. Hence, Kamsa imprisoned them and slaughtered her six boys. Anyhow, the Lord protects the 7th Balarama by subrogation into Vasudeva's first wife Rohini. On the eve of Bhadrapada Ashtami, Vishnu's avatar, Krishna, was born and mandates Vasudeva to swap with Yashoda 's baby at Gokul. Being conscious of it, Kamsa decrees to slay all the new-born. Krishna grows by showing several glories & butchering demons. Plus, he breaks Kamsa's pain and relieves his parents. At that time, he normalized his cousin Sishupala, who was born with bizarre attributes. It fears his mother, Srutashrava, because Sisupala's destiny of death is Krishna. So, she bestows a boon from Krishna by giving him 100 chances.

Years pass, and Krishna contracts Dwaraka in mid of the sea to secure Yadava from frequent attacks of Jarasandha. So, he begrudges & ruses to fix Sisupala's alliance with Vidarbha king Bhishmaka's daughter Rukmini by mingling her brother Rukmi. But she adores Krishna as a divine entity. After a brief courtship, Rukmini elopes with Krishna when Rukmi bars them, but he pardons him by half-shaving. Parallelly, Satrajit acquires a unique jewel Syamantaka as a boon from the Sun that bestows a vast amount of gold daily. Krishna requests him to hand it over to him, and he refuses—his daughter Satyabhama sweethearts for Krishna. Prasanna, Satrajit's sibling, moves to hunt wearing the jewel. A lion kills him and runs off with the gem, which has been picked up by Jambavanta and given to his daughter Jambavati. Satrajit denounces Krishna as a homicide, so he steps in when Jambavanta detects him as Rama. He endorses the jewel with Jambavati when Satrajit also repents and gifts Satyabhama. Consequently, Krishna makes eight marriages when green Narada itches for test and bows down before his lilas. Meanwhile, Kuchela, the childhood soulmate of Krishna, arrives impoverished, where the Lord provides great honor & hospitality. Kuchela hesitantly offers his favorite snack, "Atukulu," grains of parched rice, which he receives and grants endless opulence.

Today, Dharma Raja conducts a "Rajasuya" where Sishupala starts mortifying Krishna. He patiently counts his 100 absurdities and decapitates him. At this, Sakuni lays out a stratagem by inviting Dharmaja for a dice game. He snatches their wealth with a subject to a massive scandal and expels them for 13 years. After its completion, Krishna acts as an emissary between Pandava & Kaurava to prevent the Kurukshetra War. He lands at Hastinapur and submits Pandava article before Duryodhana with the consequences & results of the battle, which he bluntly deaf ears. Moreover, he attempts to seize him when they all blackouts for his Viswaroopam, the entire universe in him. Excluding, Bhishma, Drona, Vidura and enables Dhritarashtra to see his form for a few seconds. Duryodhana & Arjuna move for Krishna to bid aid, which Krishna divides as two, himself & Yadava's army, and bestows the former to Arjuna. Arjuna assuredly chooses Krishna, which elates Duryodhana without fathoming the Lord. The war begins, and Arjuna is in a dilemma about the violence and deaths of their kin. During that plight, Krishna enlightens him with the Bhagavad Gita. Pandava wipes out the Kaurava with the Lord's guidance and crowns Dharmaraja.

Afterward, they proceed with the blessing of Dhritarashtra, who wiles to kill Bhima and asks for a hug. Gazing at it, Krishna substitutes it with his iron statue, which he breaks into pieces. Here, the Lord states that until his presence, nobody can touch Pandava. Then furious Gandhari curses the destruction of his clan by internal conspiracy, which he takes for granted. Parallelly, as a correlation, Yadava is cursed by sages when Krishna's son Samba mocks them in disguise as pregnant women. According to their declaration, Samba delivers a pestle. Frightened Balarama edicts to powder and throw it into the sea, but Krishna announces it is unavoidable. The power grows into the seashore's sharpest bamboo, resulting in a total shatter. Spotting it, Balarama leaves his soul. The hunter, Jara, acquires one piece of bamboo in the sea. Unbeknownst, he shoots on sleeping Krishna's foot when he departs, glorifying that it's all his play. Finally, the movie ends happily with Krishnavatar merging into his original form of Vishnu.

== Cast ==
- N. T. Rama Rao as Lord Vishnu / Lord Krishna
- Devika as Lakshmi / Rukmini
- Kanchana as Satyabhama
- Sobhan Babu as Narada Maharshi
- Satyanarayana as Duryodhana
- V. Nagayya as Dhritarashtra
- Mikkilineni as Dharmaraju
- Dhulipala as Satrajit
- Rajanala as Sishupala
- Mukkamala as Kamsa
- Prabhakar Reddy as Balarama
- Ramakrishna as Arjuna
- Mudigonda Lingamurthy as Shakuni
- Jr. A V Subbarao as Bhishma
- Maddali Krishnamurthy as Vidura
- Arja Janardhanarao as Bheema
- Kongara Jaggarao as Dushasana
- Balaram as Karna
- Nagaraju as Sahadeva
- Tyagaraju as Nanda
- Krishna Kumari as Lakshana
- S. Varalakshmi as Draupadi
- Chhayadevi as Srutashrava
- Sukanya as Jambavati
- Rushyendramani as Kunti Devi
- Hemalatha as Gandhari Devi
- L. Vijayalakshmi as Kalindi
- Geetanjali as Nagnajiti
- Sandhya Rani as Mitravinda
- Ramadas as Rukmi
- Master Harikrishna as Bala Krishna
- Master Babu as Young Balarama

== Soundtrack ==
Sri Krishnavataram

Film score by T. V. Raju
- Released: 1967
- Genre: Soundtrack
- Label: His Master's Voice
- Producer: T. V. Raju

Music composed by T. V. Raju. Music released on His Master's Voice.

S. No.	Song title	Lyrics	Singers	length
1	"Jayahe Krishnavatara"	Samudrala Sr.	Ghantasala, P. Leela, Swarnalata, Sarojini	6:35
2	"Vinara Vinara"	C. Narayana Reddy	P. Leela	3:15
3	"Chilakala Kolikini Choodu"	C. Narayana Reddy	L.R.Eswari	3:16
4	"Nee Charana Kamalaana"	C. Narayana Reddy	Ghantasala, P. Susheela, P. Leela	5:16
5	"Maghuvala Neele Gopaludu"	C. Narayana Reddy	Ghantasala, P. Susheela	
6	"Ememo Authondhi"	C. Narayana Reddy	P. Susheela	3:20
7	"Adigo Alladigo"	C. Narayana Reddy	Ghantasala	
8	"Geetopadesam"	Samudrala Sr.	Ghantasala	

== Box office ==
The movie was a huge hit. The film was also successful in Karnataka and celebrated a Silver Jubilee. Even in the second and third releases in 1982 and 1990, it ran for more than 100 days.
