= Krishnavataram Part 1: The Heart (Hridayam) =

2026 Indian film by Hardik Gajjar

- Theatrical release poster
- Directed by: Hardik Gajjar
- Written by: Hardik Gajjar; Prakash Kapadia; Raam Mori
- Based on: Satyabhama by Raam Mori
- Produced by: Sajan Raj Kurup; Shobha Sant; Poonam Shroff; Parth Gajjar
- Starring: Siddharth Gupta; Sanskruti Jayana; Sushmitha Bhat; Nivaashiyni Krishnan
- Cinematography: Ayananka Bose
- Music by: Prasad S.
- Production companies: Creativeland Studios Entertainment; Athashrikatha Motion Pictures
- Distributed by: AA Films
- Release date: 7 May 2026
- Running time: 150 minutes
- Country: India
- Language: Hindi
- Budget: ₹60 crore
- Box office: est. ₹55 crore

Krishnavataram Part 1: The Heart (Hridayam) is a 2026 Indian Hindi-language devotional film directed by Hardik Gajjar, produced by Sajan Raj Kurup and Shobha Sant under Creativeland Studios Entertainment and Athashrikatha Motion Pictures. The first installment in the Krishnavataram trilogy stars Siddharth Gupta, Sushmitha Bhat, Nivaashiyni Krishnan and debutant Sanskruti Jayana. The film is the first installment of a planned trilogy, with the three chapters subtitled “Hridayam” (The Heart), “Manaha” (The Mind) and “Atman” (The Soul), tracing Krishna across distinct phases of his life. The music is composed by Prasad S. and cinematography by Ayananka Bose.

The film is based on Raam Mori's 2025 novel Satyabhama; it depicts Lord Krishna's life from Satyabhama's perspective, following his separation from Radha, exploring his relationship with his consorts Rukmini and Satyabhama. Originally titled Shri Radha Ramanam, it was ultimately released worldwide as Krishnavataram Part 1: The Heart (Hridayam) on 7 May 2026. The film received positive reviews from critics. It was declared tax-free in Uttar Pradesh.

== Plot ==
In the present day, a skeptical young man visits the Jagannath Temple, Puri. A priest counters his rationale by recounting the life of Lord Krishna, emphasizing that his true essence is love, explored through his relationships with Radha, Rukmini, and Satyabhama.

The narrative shifts to the past. In Vrindavan, a young Krishna shares a spiritual love with his childhood companion, Radha. When Krishna leaves for Mathura to fulfill his destiny and defeat his tyrannical uncle, Kans, he promises to play his flute for Radha one last time before his mortal death. Years later, Krishna rules as the King of Dvārakā. During a chariot race, he meets Bhama, daughter of the merchant Satrajit. Bhama falls in love with Krishna despite her father's deep enmity toward him.

While Bhama hopes to win Krishna's heart, he returns from a journey with a bride, Princess Rukmini of Vidharba. Rukmini, an incarnation of Goddess Lakshmi, had written to Krishna requesting rescue from an arranged marriage to Shishupala. Acknowledging her devotion, compassion and affection, Krishna intervenes and marries her; he recognises her as his wife and his love.

Later, Satrajit falsely accuses Krishna of stealing the sacred Syamantaka jewel. To clear his name, Krishna tracks the jewel to the bear king Jambavan, eventually returning with both the gem and Jambavan's daughter, Jambavati, as his wife. Bhama exposes her father's lies to defend Krishna. In honor of her honesty, she earns the name Satyabhama and is accepted as Krishna's wife.

When the demon Narakasura abducts 16,000 women, Satyabhama accompanies Krishna into battle. Krishna reveals that Satyabhama is an incarnation of the earth goddess, Bhumi, making her the only one capable of killing Narakasura due to a cosmic boon. Satyabhama slays the demon, and to protect the honor of the rescued women, she requests Krishna to wed them all as their refuge.

Following the Kurukshetra War and the fulfillment of Gandhari's curse, the Yadava clan destroys itself, and Dvārakā begins to submerge into the ocean. Pierced by an arrow fired by the hunter Jara, a dying Krishna plays his flute to fulfill his final promise to Radha. As the survivors prepare to flee the sinking city, Satyabhama peacefully immerses herself into the ocean to reunite with Krishna in the afterlife.

In the present day, the young man is profoundly moved by the story. As he exits the temple, he discovers the real priest has just arrived late. He finds only a peacock feather where the storyteller stood, realizing he had been speaking to Krishna himself.

== Cast ==
- Siddharth Gupta as Krishna, 8th avatar of Vishnu, king of Dvārakā and Vishnu.
- Sanskruti Jayana as Satyabhama, avatar of Bhumi, an incarnation of Lakshmi, third wife of Krishna.
- Sushmitha Bhat as Radha, Krishna's love in Vrindavan, an incarnation of Lakshmi.
- Nivaashiyni Krishnan as Rukmini, avatar of Lakshmi, chief wife of Krishna, queen of Dvārakā.
- Jantee Hazarika as Jambavati, an incarnation of Lakshmi, second wife of Krishna
- Karthik Jayaram as Satrajit, Sathyabhama's father.
- Amanjot Singh as Balarama, avatar of Shesha, Krishna's elder brother
- Smrithi Srikanth as Subhadra, Krishna's younger half-sister
- Apeksha Shetty as Revati, avatar of Nagalakshmi, Balarama's wife
- Akshara Shivakumar as Draupadi, wife of the Pandavas
- Samadh Choudhary as Uddhava, counsellor of Krishna
- Maharshi Dave as Narada Muni, a divine cosmic messenger, dedicated to Vishnu.
- Shiv Narayanan as Vasudeva, Krishna's father
- Rashmi Sachdeva as Gandhari, queen of Hastinapur
- Shuman Das as Krithverma, a warrior from the Yaduvamsha, Krishna's cousin
- Keyur Khamar as Satyaki, a powerful Yadava chief of Narayani Sena, devoted to Krishna
- Vikram Singh Rathod as a young man, visiting the Jagannath Temple, Puri.
- Jackie Shroff as Gopaldas Guruji, Cameo
- Sudesh Berry as Rishi, Cameo.

== Production ==
=== Development ===
On 9 August 2024, the film was officially announced by the director and production house, producers of Devon Ke Dev...Mahadev and Siya Ke Ram, a teaser was shown of the film titled Shri Radha Ramanam. From 2024 to 2025, Principal photography commenced in New Delhi. In April 2026, a motion poster and trailer was released at Krishna Janmasthan Temple Complex, Mathura.

=== Release ===
On 7 May 2026, Krishnavataram Part 1: The Heart (Hridayam) was released in theaters worldwide in three languages, including Tamil and Telugu dubbed versions.

== Music ==
The film's soundtrack and background score were composed by Prasad S., with the music rights acquired by Saregama. The album was released in Hindi, Tamil and Telugu. On 22 April 2026, the first song "Prem Ki Leela" was released.

Hindi
No.	Title	Lyrics	Singer(s)	Length
1.	"Prem Ki Leela"	Irshad Kamil	Shreya Ghoshal, Javed Ali, Suvarna Tiwari	4:41
2.	"Kunj Bihari"	Irshad Kamil	Prasad S	3:15
3.	"Shyamal Sanware"	Irshad Kamil	Sonu Nigam, Neeti Mohan, Prasad S	5:34
4.	"Mukhda Dikha Jaiyo"	Irshad Kamil	Shweta Mohan	4:36
5.	"Mann Ki Dasha"	Irshad Kamil	Shreya Ghoshal	5:10
6.	"Shubh Din Aayo"	Irshad Kamil	Shweta Mohan, Abby V, Shivam Singh	4:42
7.	"Krishna Govinda"	Irshad Kamil	Sunidhi Chauhan	3:45
8.	"Anth Mein Aarambh"	Irshad Kamil	Sonu Nigam	5:05
Total length:				35:28

Tamil
No.	Title	Lyrics	Singer(s)	Length
1.	"Kaadhalin Leelai"	Naveen Bharathi	Haripriya, Pavithra Chari, Shibi Srinivasan	2:39
2.	"Radha Krishna"	Naveen Bharathi	Sai Vignesh
3.	"Kannanin Ekkathil"	Naveen Bharathi	Reshma Shyam, Sreekanth Hariharan	5:36
4.	"Kaadhal Soozhum Vannam"	Naveen Bharathi	Aparna Harikumar
5.	"Manadhin Nilai"	Naveen Bharathi	Haripriya
6.	"Thirunaal Varugai"	Naveen Bharathi	Aparna Harikumar, Keshav Vinod, Sudharsan Hemaram
7.	"Krishna Govinda"	Naveen Bharathi	Malavika Rajhesh
8.	"Mudivile Aarambam"	Naveen Bharathi	Sreekanth Hariharan
Total length:				36:36

Telugu
No.	Title	Lyrics	Singer(s)	Length
1.	"Prema Leela"	Phanideep Viswanadha	Sireesha Bhagavatula, Pavithra Chari, Shibi Srinivasan	2:39
2.	"Radha Krishna"	Phanideep Viswanadha	Sai Vignesh
3.	"Shyaama Sundara"	Phanideep Viswanadha	Reshma Shyam, Sreekanth Hariharan	5:36
4.	"Vethike Kanule"	Phanideep Viswanadha	Disha Prakash
5.	"Manse Nadipe"	Phanideep Viswanadha	Sireesha Bhagavatula
6.	"Vache Subha Dinam"	Phanideep Viswanadha	Disha Prakash, Keshav Vinod, Sudharsan Hemaram
7.	"Krishna Govinda"	Phanideep Viswanadha	Soujanya Bhagavatula
8.	"Anthame Aarambhamu"	Phanideep Viswanadha	Sreekanth Hariharan
Total length:				36:35

== Reception ==
=== Critical response ===
Krishnavataram Part 1: The Heart (Hridayam) received positive reviews from critics.

Janani K of India Today gave 4/5 stars, writing "Despite its flaws, Krishnavataram does remain engaging through most of its 2-hour-25-minute runtime. The current mood of the country definitely gives religious films an edge, but this one also earns attention through visual ambition and the decision to spotlight Bhama's story – something mainstream adaptations have rarely explored this lavishly." Filmfare gave 3.5/5 stars, writing that what ultimately made the film special is its "understanding of Krishna as both divine and profoundly human. The film does not reduce him to miracles alone. It explores his compassion, emotional complexity and spiritual wisdom with tenderness and respect." Simran Singh of Daily News and Analysis gave 3.5/5 stars, writing "The film is backed by an impressive storytelling that commands your attention from the first frame."

Dhaval Roy of Times Of India gave 3.5/5 stars, writing "The film's intent to portray Krishna's ethos of love and devotion comes through, further elevated by its performances. Siddharth Gupta delivers a strong performance. Bhat as Radha, Jayana as Bhama, and Krishnan as Rukmini deliver sincere turns overall. The story is spectacle-led, but the grand visuals, music and performances make it worth a theatrical watch." Radhika Sharma of NDTV gave the movie 3 out of 5 stars and commented that the film "delivers a full-circle musical-mythological journey through his life -- narrated via lavish song-and-dance sequences and sprawling sets that sometimes falls short in the visual effects department". Bollywood Hungama rated the movie 3 out of 5 stars and wrote that the film was a "sincere, visually rich and emotionally resonant devotional saga. The film does suffer due to its slow first half, excess songs and a few uneven patches in the storytelling and VFX. However, its respectful depiction of Lord Krishna, strong emotional core and grandeur make it a worthy watch".
