= Vinayaka Chaviti =

1957 film

- Theatrical release poster
- Directed by: Samudrala Sr
- Written by: Samudrala Sr. (dialogues)
- Produced by: K. Gopala Rao
- Starring: N. T. Rama Rao; Jamuna
- Cinematography: C. Nageswara Rao
- Edited by: N. S. Prakash
- Music by: Ghantasala
- Production company: Aswaraja Pictures
- Release date: 22 August 1957
- Country: India
- Language: Telugu

Vinayaka Chaviti is a 1957 Telugu-language Hindu mythological film written and directed by Samudrala Sr. It stars N. T. Rama Rao, Jamuna and music composed by Ghantasala. It was produced by K. Gopala Rao under the Aswaraja Pictures banner. The story is of Syamantakopakhyanam, annually read during the Ganesh Chaturthi festival day celebrations of Lord Vinayaka. The film was dubbed into Tamil as Vinayaga Chathurthi and was released in 1959 and later into Hindi in 1973 as Ganesh Chaturti.

== Cast ==
- N. T. Rama Rao as Lord Krishna
- Jamuna as Satyabhama
- Krishna Kumari as Rukmini
- Gummadi as Satrajit
- Rajanala as Prasena
- R. Nageswara Rao as Sathadhana
- A. Prakasa Rao as Narada Maharshi
- Balakrishna as Vasanthaka
- Suryakala as Goddess Parvathi
- Satya Devi as Jambavathi

== Music ==
Vinayaka Chaviti

Film score by Ghantasala
- Released: 1957
- Genre: Soundtrack
- Producer: Ghantasala

Music was composed by Ghantasala. Lyrics were written by Samudrala Sr. The song Dinakara Subhakara is a memorable.

S. No.	Song title	Singers	length
1	"Aa Nalinakshi"	Ghantasala	
2	"Alinchara Moralinchara"	P. Leela	
3	"Arunaya Saranyaya"	Ghantasala	
4	"Chinni Krishnamma"	Ghantasala	
5	"Dinakara Subhakara"	Ghantasala	
6	"Hare Narayana"	Ghantasala	
7	"Jagadeka Rambhaye"	Ghantasala	
8	"Jaya Gana Nayaka Vinayaka"	Ghantasala, P. Susheela	
9	"Kaliki Ne Krishnudane"	P. Susheela, A. P. Komala	
10	"Kannulalo Merise"	P. Leela	
11	"Nalugidare Nalugidare"	P. Susheela	
12	"Ninu Nera Nammithira"	P. Susheela	
13	"Pratahkale Bhavet Brahma"	Ghantasala	
14	"Raja Premajoopara"	M. S. Rama Rao, P. Leela	
15	"Sailasuta Hrudayesa"	P. Susheela	
16	"Tanuvooge Naa Manasuooge"	P. Leela	
17	"Thondamuneka Dantamunu"	Ghantasala	
18	"Vatapi Ganapatim Bhaje"	Ghantasala	
19	"Vesenu Naa Madi"	Sarojini	
20	"Yashoda Kishora"	M. S. Rama Rao	
