= Rohini (Krishna's wife) =

Queen of the god Krishna in Hinduism

Rohini is a queen of the Hindu god Krishna, who is an avatar of the god Vishnu and the king of Dvaraka in the Dvapara Yuga (epoch). She is mentioned as a queen in the Hindu epic Mahabharata, the Vishnu Purana, the Bhagavata Purana, and the Harivamsa, an appendix of the Mahabharata. Krishna is described to have the eight principal queen-consorts, the Ashtabharya and 16,000 or 16,100 ceremonial wives; Rohini is described as one of the Ashtabharya or identified with the queen Jambavati in some lists and head of the other wives in a different list.

== Association with Jambavati ==
The Vishnu Purana says that Rohini is very beautiful. Ratnagrabha, a commentator on the scripture, includes her as one of the Ashtabharya, identifying her with Jambavati. He considers Rohini as the queen's birth name and Jambavati, a patronymic literally "daughter of Jambavan" her epithet. However, another commentator Sridhara disagrees and considers her as distinct from Jambavati. The Vishnu Purana mentions that she had Diptimat, Tamrapaksha and other sons. The Harivamsa also suggests that Rohini may be an alternate name of Jambavati. Indologist Horace Hayman Wilson feels that in the Vishnu Purana as well as the Bhagavata Purana, Rohini and Jambavati are different individuals. He feels that she could a later addition to the original list of 8 chief queens.

== Head of non-principal wives ==
The Bhagavata Purana does not mention her when the eight principal wives are mentioned. Rohini and Krishna are described to have unspecified number of sons, out of which only Diptiman and Tamratapta are named. Many commentaries and translations of the scripture regard Rohini to be the chief of the 16,000 non-principal wives - who were kidnapped by the demon Narakasura and were rescued by Krishna after killing the demon - and represents them.

== Death ==
The Mausala Parva of the Mahabharata which describes the death of Krishna and end of his race records four of Krishna's wives, including Rohini jumped into his funeral pyre, immolating themselves.
