= Junior wives of Krishna =

Unnamed junior wives of Hindu god Krishna

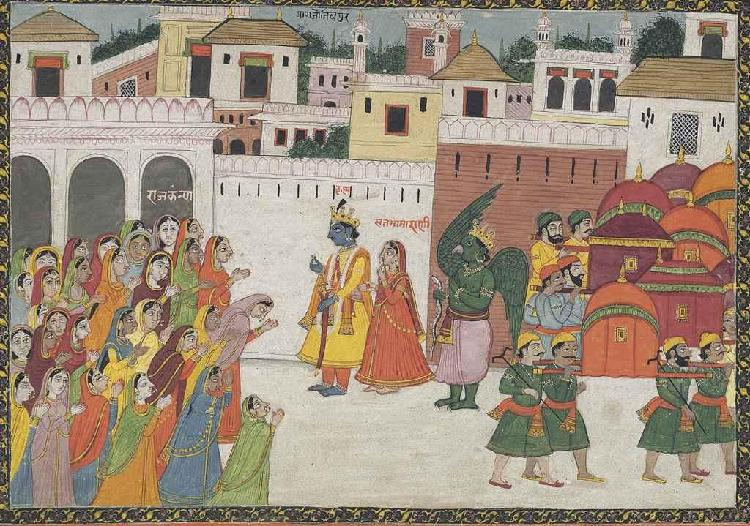
The captive women of Narakasura greet Krishna (right).

Besides the Ashtabharya (Eight principal queens of Krishna), Krishna is described to have married several thousand women whom he rescued from the demon Narakasura. The Bhagavata Purana and the Mahabharata state that 16,000 women were rescued, however the Vishnu Purana and the Harivamsa (appendix of the Mahabharata) differ and set the number as 16,100. These 16,000 junior queens are all identified as manifestations of goddess Lakshmi, the eternal consort of Krishna or Vishnu. Generally all of them are unnamed, however many commentators of the Bhagavata Purana regard Rohini to be their leader, though such an explicit mention is not found in the scripture.

== Before captivity by Narakasura ==
The Bhagavata Purana mentions that the captive women are princesses. The Vishnu Purana says that they are daughters of gods, siddhas (saints), demons and kings. According to the Kalika Purana and the Adi Parva book of the Hindu epic Mahabharata, they were apsaras (celestial female spirits). In the Dana Dharma chapter of the Shanti Parva book affixed centuries later, they are blessed by the goddess Bhudevi to be wives of Krishna.

Some legends narrate that events in their past life led to them being wives of Krishna. A king had 16,000 daughters. While the king was sitting in court with the princesses, Vishnu arrived disguised as a sage. The daughters flocked around Vishnu, making their father angry who cursed them. When the daughters cried and begged for forgiveness, the king blessed them that in their next birth, they would be wives of Vishnu. In other versions, the damsels plead to others for liberation from the curse. The creator-god Brahma, on the advice of his son and divine sage Narada or the sage, himself give the princesses the boon to be wives of Vishnu.

== Captivity and release ==
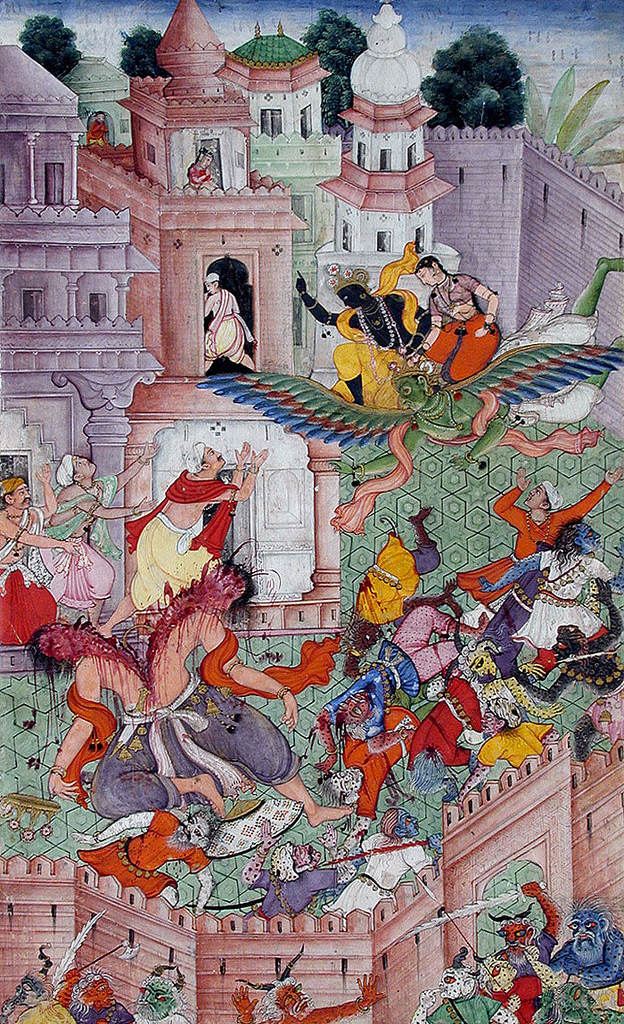
Krishna kills Narakasura.

Narakasura was the king of Pragjyotisha. He was the demon (asura) son of Vishnu's boar avatar Varaha and the earth-goddess Bhumi. As the son of Bhumi, he was also called Bhauma or Bhaumasura (asura suffix appended). He conquered the three worlds: heaven, earth, and the underworld. On earth, he captured 16,000 princesses of defeated nations. In heaven, he stole the earrings of Aditi, mother of Indra - the king of the devas and heaven. In the underworld, he seized the imperial umbrella of Varuna, the god of the waters.

The captive women were imprisoned at Audaka on the top of the mountain Maniparvata in his kingdom. Various demons including the five-headed Mura and his seven sons guarded the kingdom's gates. Narakasura's ten sons guarded the women.

Indra comes to Krishna and pleads with him to save the universe from Narakasura's tyranny. Krishna and his third wife Satyabhama fly on their mount Garuda to Pragjyotisha. Krishna slays Mura, his sons, Narakasura's army, and finally the demon-king himself. Bhumi surrenders all stolen items, including the captive women to Krishna. When Krishna arrives in the palace of the captive women, each of them prays to Krishna to accept her as his wife. Krishna complies and sends them to his capital with Narakasura's plunder and four-tusked white elephants gifted by Bhumi. After returning Aditi's earrings to Indra in heaven, Krishna returns to Dvaraka and marries the rescued women, making them his wives, saving them from destitution and infamy.

== Marital life ==
The Bhagavata Purana describes the life of Krishna's wives after their marriage. Each of the junior wives was given a home, with hundreds of maid-servants. Krishna divides himself into several forms, one for each wife, and spends the night with each wife simultaneously. In the morning, all his forms unite into one body of Krishna when Krishna works as the king of Dvaraka.

In another story narrated in the Bhagavata Purana, Narada, Vishnu's devotee and wandering sage, was curious to find out how Krishna was managing to live with his 16,108 wives and came to Dvaraka to check. Krishna welcomed Narada with all the honors due to him being a sage. Narada then visited every one of the houses of Krishna's 16,108 wives and was surprised to see Krishna present in every house with his wife in an atmosphere of total domesticity, laughing and joking with his wife and taking care of his children, and helping his wife in household chores. Watching this phenomenon, Narada was convinced that it was divinity in the form of Krishna, a complete and manifold manifestation who had enjoyed the company of his 16,108 consorts at the same time. He also concluded that Krishna was a divine supreme being. Having satisfied himself of the divine powers of the deity himself, Narada embarked on his usual voyages around the world singing the praise of Krishna. A variant tells that the mischief-maker sage Narada requested Krishna to gift him one of his many wives, as he was a bachelor. Krishna told him to win any wife for himself if he was not with her. Then Narada went round to each of the houses of Krishna's 16,108 wives but found Krishna in every house that he visited, and thus Narada had to remain a bachelor.

In the Bhagavata Purana, Rohini and Krishna are described to have an unspecified number of sons, out of which only Diptiman and Tamratapta are named. The sons are said to represent all the children of the junior wives.

The Bhavishya Purana, the Skanda Purana and the Varaha Purana narrate that some of Krishna's junior wives were infatuated with Samba, the handsome, trouble-maker son of Krishna and one of his senior queens, Jambavati. One wife, Nandini, disguised herself as Samba's wife and embraced him. For this incest, Krishna cursed Samba to be inflicted with leprosy and his wives to be kidnapped by Abhira robbers after his death.

The Bhagavata Purana records the wailing of Krishna's queens and their subsequent leap in Krishna's funeral pyre immolating themselves (see sati). The Mausala Parva book of the Mahabharata which describes the death of Krishna and end of most of his race records only four of Krishna's wives, including Rohini, committing sati. Dvaraka submerges in the ocean and the rest of its inhabitants including Krishna's widows accompany Krishna's friend Arjuna to his capital Hastinapura. On the way, Abhira robbers attack the entourage and plunder their wealth and kidnap some of Krishna's widows. Some of the widows burn themselves alive. When the entourage reaches Hastinapura, all other widows retire to the forest for austerities (tapas).

== Interpretations ==
The Gopis, milkmaids from the life of young Krishna - who was a herdsman, are sometimes called his 16,000 wives. This mythology of Krishna's love with gopis is also described theologically as devotional worship of Krishna. The gopis risked having a relationship with him. It is also said he assumed 16,000 forms at the same time to be with all of them for his love play.

Another theory relates the Krishna, who plays the flute and the lover of music, and his 16,000 wives to the 16,000 ragas or musical modes or passions or affections of the mind in Indian classical music, and their wives - the Raginis (female raga). The Raginis selected one of these ragas to which to modulate her strains for affecting and securing the heart of Krishna, the blissful and harmonious deity. Krishna who was devoted to music received and enjoyed every variety of modulation, multiplied to the number of 16,000, fancifully personified in the form of the women derived from Bhauma (a name of Narakasura), a five-stringed musical instrument.
