= Uddhava =

Friend of Hindu deity Krishna

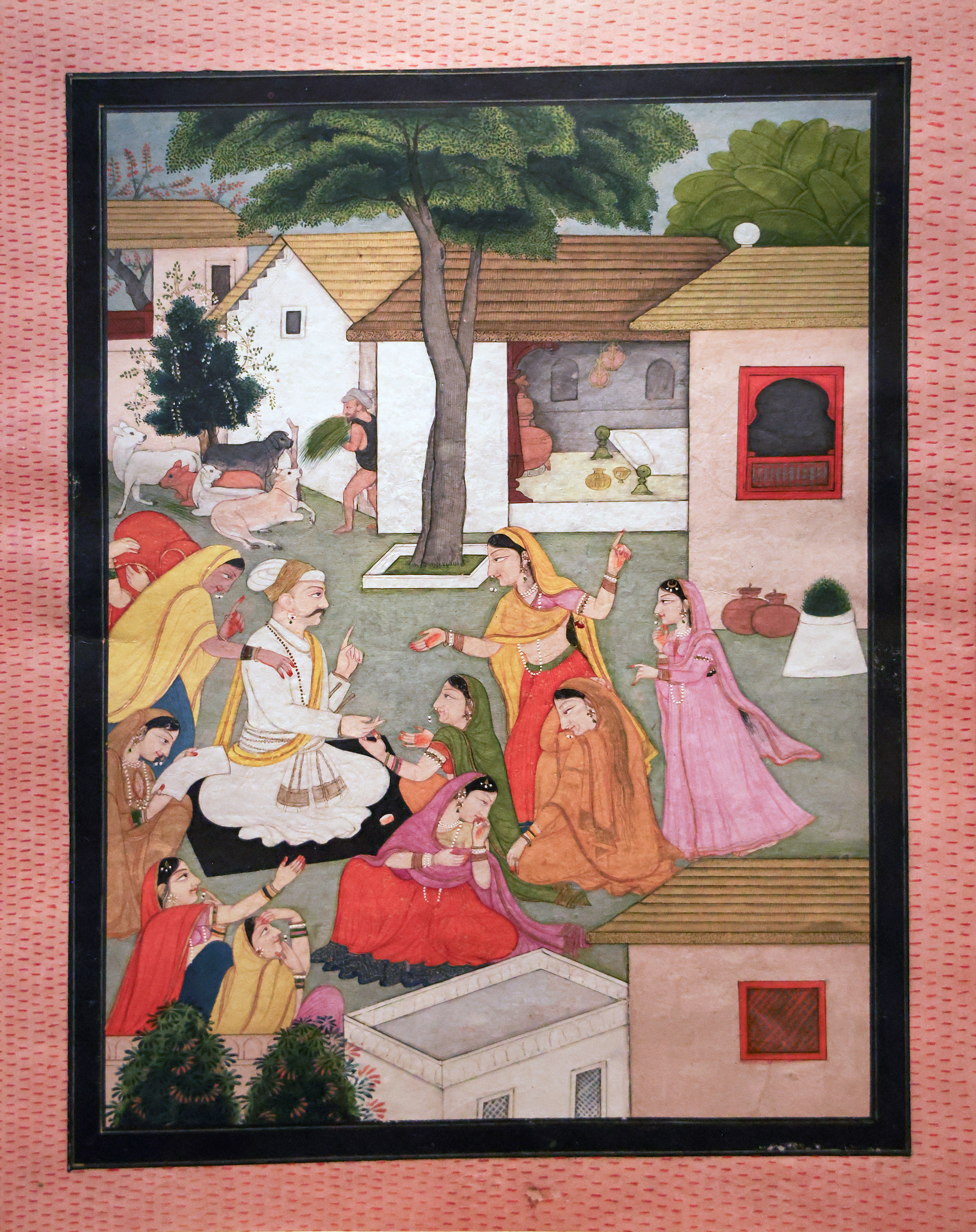
- Painting of Uddhava the messenger of Krishna
- Other names: Pavanayadhi
- Affiliation: Vrishni
- Texts: Puranas, Mahabharata

Genealogy
- Dynasty: Yaduvamsha

Uddhava (Sanskrit: उद्धव, romanized: Uddhava) is a character from the Puranic texts of Hinduism, described to be the friend and counsellor of Krishna. He plays a significant role in the Bhagavata Purana, being taught the processes of yoga and bhakti directly by Krishna. The principle of these discussions is often referred to as the Uddhava Gita, similarly to the Bhagavad Gita wherein Krishna instructs Arjuna.

According to some texts Uddhava was also Krishna's cousin, being the son of Devabhaga, who was the brother of Vasudeva, Krishna's father. His physical appearance was so like that of Krishna's that in some instances, he is mistaken for the latter. The Mahabharata mentions that Uddhava was a minister of the Vrishnis, whom they all regarded and respected. The Bhagavata Purana mentions that Uddhava was a disciple of Brihaspati.

== Legend ==
=== Messenger to Vrindavana ===
In the Bhagavata Purana and Brahmavaivarta Purana, after Krishna had defeated Kamsa, Uddhava came to see him, much to Krishna's pleasure. Krishna requested Uddhava to visit Vrindavana with a message on his behalf to the gopis and other residents of the village, who were missing his company. Krishna asks Uddhava to tell the people of Vrindavana to forget about him because he needed to be forgotten by his devotees to complete his duties on earth. Uddhava was so mesmerised with the devotion of Radha and gopis towards Krishna that he stayed in Vrindavana for the next six months, where he also asked the gopis to be his teachers. The gopis told him that when Akrura came to Vrindavana, he took their Krishna with him, and rhetorically asked him if he was there to take away their memories of him from them as well, to which Uddhava was rendered speechless. The content of the message and the feelings aroused by it when heard by the residents of Vrindavana constitute the highest understanding of the love of God in the tradition of Gaudiya Vaishnavism.

=== Uddhava Gita ===
Krishna delivered the Uddhava Gita (also referred to as Hamsa Gita) to Uddhava shortly before he left the world in order to help console Uddhava after his forthcoming departure. It commences with Uddhava's perplexity after he saw the impending destruction of the Yaduvamsha community, in which Krishna was also brought up, born as a Kshatriya.

Uddhava was famous as a devotee and a dear friend of Krishna, but even he could not fathom why he had not prevented the destruction from happening. Brahma, the creator and the celestials implored Krishna to return to his divine abode after the purpose of his descent was over. Krishna then explained why the Yadavas had to perish, stating that due to the insolence caused by their prowess, heroism, and fortune, the Yadavas wished to conquer the entirety of the earth. He informed him that the earth would suffer if he did not take his clan with him before his demise. Greatly saddened by this, Uddhava approached Krishna and besought him to take him as well. In reply, Krishna expounded the Uddhava Gita.

== See also ==
- Akrura
- Bhakti yoga
- Narada
- Four Kumaras
