= Hamsa Gita =

Concept in Hinduism

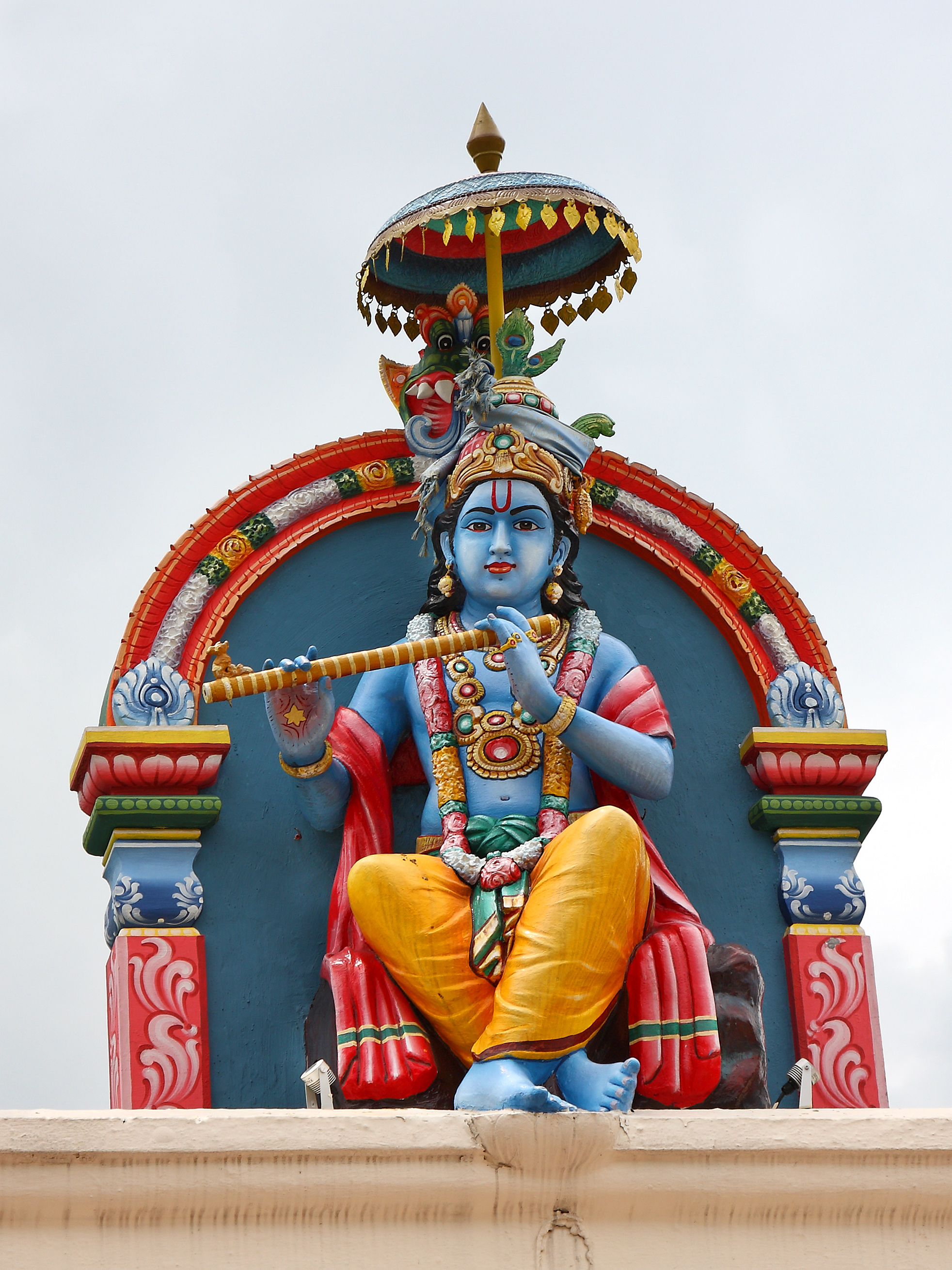
Krishna's statue at the Sri Mariamman Temple, Singapore.

Hamsa Gita (Sanskrit), also known as the Uddhava Gita, is Krishna's final discourse to Uddhava, delivered shortly before Krishna draws his worldly 'descent' (Sanskrit: avatar) and 'pastimes' (Sanskrit: lila) to completion. It forms part of the eleventh book (skandha) of the Bhagavata Purana, commencing from verse 40 of chapter 6 through to the end of chapter 29, comprising total of 1100 'verses' (Sanskrit: shloka). It is considered part of the Purana literature proper rather than a freestanding text, even though it is also published independently. This discourse importantly contains the story of an Avadhuta and though it does not state explicitly the name of this personage within the section or the Bhagavata Purana as a whole, Vaishnava tradition and the greater Sanatana Dharma auspice ascribes this agency to Dattatreya.

== Manuscripts and textual notes ==
The names Uddhava Gita and Hamsa Gita are popularly interchangeable but Hamsa Gita also specifically denotes (xi. 13- 16) a subset of the Uddhava Gita and the Bhagavata Purana proper.

== Nomenclature, orthography and etymology ==
Hamsa Gita (Sanskrit) (also referred to as Uddhava Gita) where the hamsa is a metaphor for the Paramahamsa as well as a natural teacher of grace evident in nature. The hamsa (हंस, in Sanskrit and often written hansa) is a swan, often considered to be the mute swan (Cygnus olor). It is used in Indian culture as a symbol and a decorative element. The term 'gītā' (literally "song" in Sanskrit; Devanagari: गीता). The swan is a metaphorical representation of one's discriminative capabilities referring to the swan's ability to sieve out its nourishment from the composite material around.

== English discourse ==
Tigunait (2002: pp. 39–45) render the narrative of the 24 teachers of Dattatreya in the Uddhava Gita into English. Though the consensus of scholars hold the Bhagavata Purana to be a composite work of the oral tradition of many mouths, the Vaishnava tradition as well as the Bhagavata Purana itself uphold that it was scribed by Vyasadeva. That said, the narrator of the Hamsa Gita is the sage Shuka, son of Vyasadeva. Even if the work is composite, that it "...does not show the lack of cohesion or compactness that must mark the work handled by many writers..." says Upadhyaya in the Foreword to Brown & Saraswati (2000: p. 8) and then Upadhyaya moreover opines that whosoever the poet of the Hamsa Gita and the Bhagavata Purana may be that "[h]ere is a poet who uses pattern and metaphor in a complex craftsmanship to create a ritual of celebration." Haigh (2007: p. 127) in his opening paragraph to his work on the Uddhava Gita frames its import as a model of environmental education:

Sri Dattatreya, who Lord Krishna quotes in The Uddhava Gita, has been evoked as a guru for environmental education. Sri Dattatreya gained enlightenment by observing the world, which provided Him with 24 instructors. These taught Him the futility of mundane attachments, the benefits of contemplation and forebearance [sic], and a path towards the spiritual self-realization of the Supreme. Sri Dattatreya, an incarnation of Trimurti, features in several Puranas where His teachings involve direct challenges to the pretensions and prejudices of the learner. His core message is "never judge by surface appearances but always seek a deeper Truth": the Earth is sacred, an aspect of God, and a puzzle that challenges the spiritual self to awaken to its true nature.

Paramahamsa (undated: p.65) arrays a suite of Gita literature enshrined and subsumed within the auspice of the Mahapuranas and holds that they are all songs of Monism:

"The Gitas that find place in the Maha-puranas such as the Uddhava-Gita, the Rudra-Gita, the Bhikshu-Gita, the Sruti-Gita, the Hamsa-Gita, etc. propound Monism as the essence of their philosophy."

=== English renderings ===
Upadhyaya, in the Foreword to Brown & Saraswati (2000: p. 8) holds that Saraswati (that is Ambikananda) who herself is a sannyasin and took this ashrama from a very young age, writes thus:

Swami Ambikananda's success in rendering the work into metrical composition is a tribute to the versatility of Sanskrit and the lucidity of the original writing. The method of her translation is marked by two considerations. She has sought to find close equivalents, keeping in view both the formal and dynamic aspects of the language; and her interpretative translation aims at complete naturalness of expression, pointing the reader to the modes of behaviour within the context of his or her own culture.

Sarasvati in Brown and Sarasvati (2000: p. 14) holds that it was both Venkatesananda (1921 - 1982) and his guruji Sivananda (1887 - 1963) that opened her heart to this work:

It was Swami Sivananda and Swami Venkatesananda who opened my heart to this sacred text, and their teaching that enabled me to undertake this translation, which attempts to convey its message to all spiritual seekers.

== Primary resources ==
=== Sanskrit ===
- Uddhava Gita @ Wikisource in Devanagari Unicode
- Hamsa Gita @ Wikisource in Devanagari Unicode

=== English ===
- The Uddhava Gita by International Gita Society - PDF version
