= Satyabhama =

Third queen-consort of the Hindu god Krishna

- Member of Ashtabharya
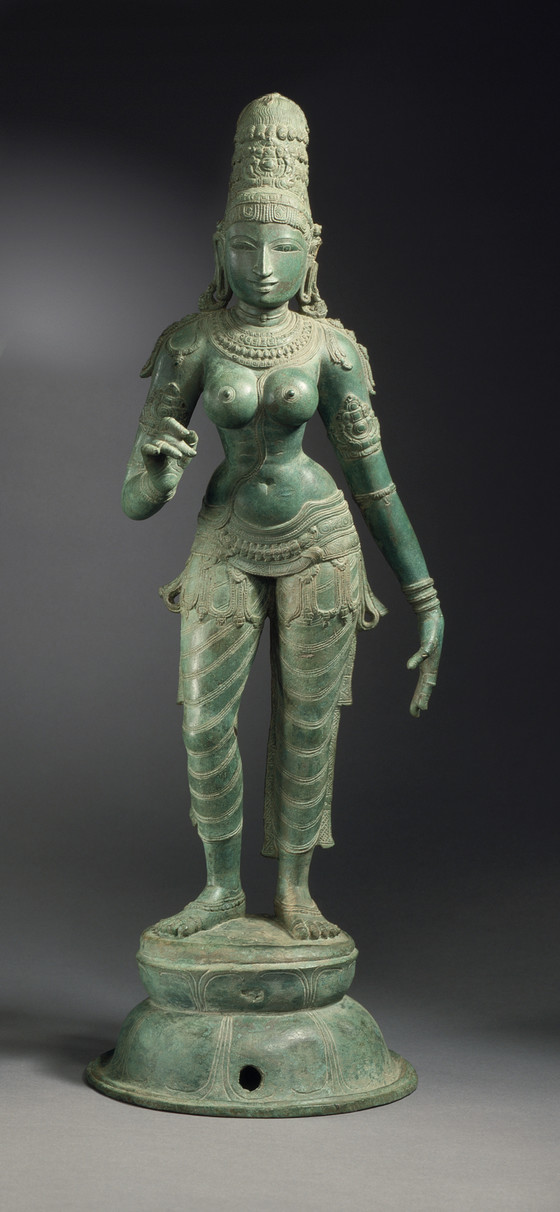
- 12th-13th century sculpture of Satyabhama
- Other names: Satrajiti
- Devanagari: सत्यभामा
- Sanskrit transliteration: Satyabhāmā
- Venerated in: Vaishnavism
- Affiliation: Avatar of Bhudevi as an aspect of Lakshmi
- Abode: Dvārakā
- Texts: Vishnu Purana; Mahabharata; Harivamsa; Bhagavata Purana; Garga Samhita
- Gender: Female
- Festivals: Naraka Chaturdashi

Genealogy
- Parents: Satrajita (father)
- Consort: Krishna
- Children: Bhanu
- Dynasty: Yaduvamsha

Satyabhama (IAST: Satyabhāmā), also known as Satrajiti, is a Hindu goddess and the third queen consort of the Hindu god Krishna. Satyabhama is described as an incarnation of Bhumi, an aspect of Lakshmi. She is the goddess and the personification of the Earth. According to some traditions, she is regarded to have aided Krishna in defeating the asura Narakasura.

== Etymology and epithets ==
The name Satyabhama comes from the Sanskrit words Satya meaning 'truth', Bha meaning 'brilliance', and Ma meaning 'Lakshmi' and 'glory'. Other nicknames include

- Satrajiti - Daughter of Satrajit
- Rajyashri - Prosperity, majesty and wealth of the kingdom, symbolizing royal beauty

== Legend ==
=== Marriage to Krishna ===
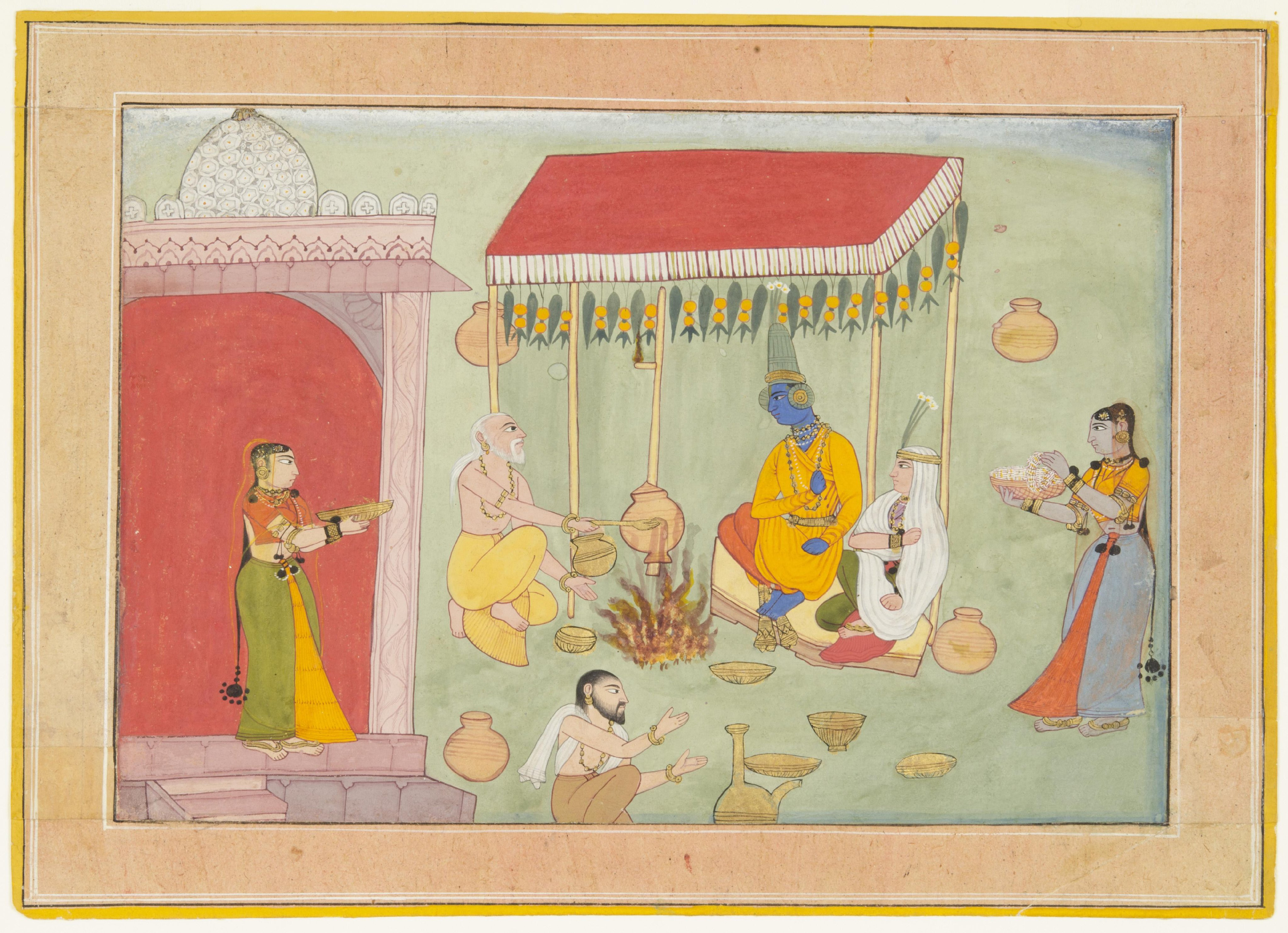
The Wedding of Satyabhama and Krishna

Satyabhama was the daughter of Yadava King Satrajita, the royal treasurer of Dvaraka, who was the owner of the Syamantaka jewel. Satrajita, who secured the jewel from the sun-god Surya and would not part with it even when Krishna, the king of Dvaraka, asked for it saying it would be safe with him. Shortly thereafter, Prasena, the brother of Satrajita, went out hunting wearing the jewel but was killed by a lion. Jambavan, known for his role in the Ramayana, killed the lion and gave the jewel to his daughter Jambavati. When Prasena did not return, there were accusations of Krishna murdering Prasena for stealing the jewel for himself.

Krishna, in order to remove the stain on his reputation, set out with his men in search of the jewel and found it in Jambavan's cave, with his daughter. Jambavan attacked Krishna thinking him to be an intruder who had come to take away the jewel. They fought each other for 28 days, when Jambavan, whose whole body was terribly weakened from the incisions of Krishna's sword, finally recognized him as Rama and surrendered to him.

As repentance for his deeds, Jambavan returned the jewel back to Krishna and requested him to marry his daughter Jambavati. Krishna returned the jewel to Satrajita. He promptly offered to give Krishna the jewel and his daughter Satyabhama in marriage. Krishna accepted her, but refused the jewel.

Satyabhama bore Krishna 10 sons: Bhanu, Svabhanu, Subhanu, Bhanuman, Prabhanu, Atibhanu, Pratibhanu, Shribhanu, Bruhadbhanu, and Chandrabhanu.

=== Killing of Narakasura ===
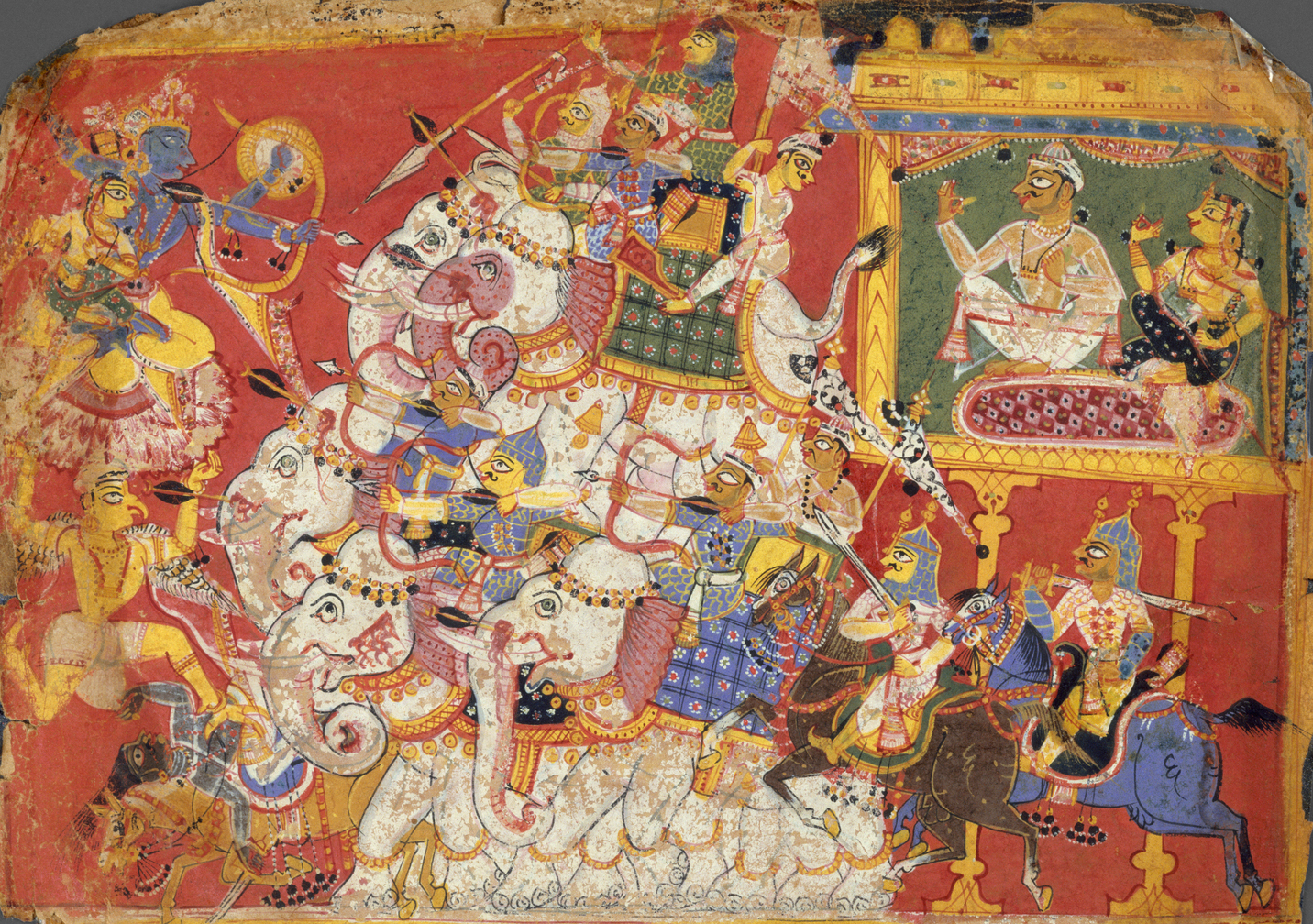
Krishna and Satyabhama fighting Narakasura's Akshauhini. Painting from the Metropolitan Museum.

Narakasura was a danava tyrant, who captured and governed the city of Pragjyotisha, believed in Assamese tradition to be located in the present-day Assam. He was the son of Bhumi, the goddess of the earth. Narakasura was infamous for his wicked ruling and high disregard for demigods and women.

Narakasura defeated Indra and abducted 16,000 women, imprisoning them in his palace. He stole the earrings of Aditi, the heavenly mother goddess and usurped some of her territories. Upon this, the king of the devas, Indra, requested Krishna to conquer and kill the asura and free Devaloka from his atrocities. At his request, Krishna sieged the city of Narkasura with the assistance of his mount, Garuda, along with his wife Satyabhama.

A terrible battle ensued between Krishna and Narkasura, which ended with the asura being slain by the deity's Sudarshana Chakra. Thereafter, Krishna obtained the stolen ear-rings of the mother of the gods, Aditi. Aditi was pleased by Satyabhama's dedication towards her husband and granted her the boon of perpetual youth. This is celebrated as the regional occasion of Naraka Chaturdashi, which falls on the first day of the festival of Deepavali.

Krishna and Satyabhama's victory against Narakasura liberated the asura's prisoners. Having rescued the 16,000 women, Krishna married them upon their request to restore them of their honour in society, making them his junior wives.

=== Tulabharam ===
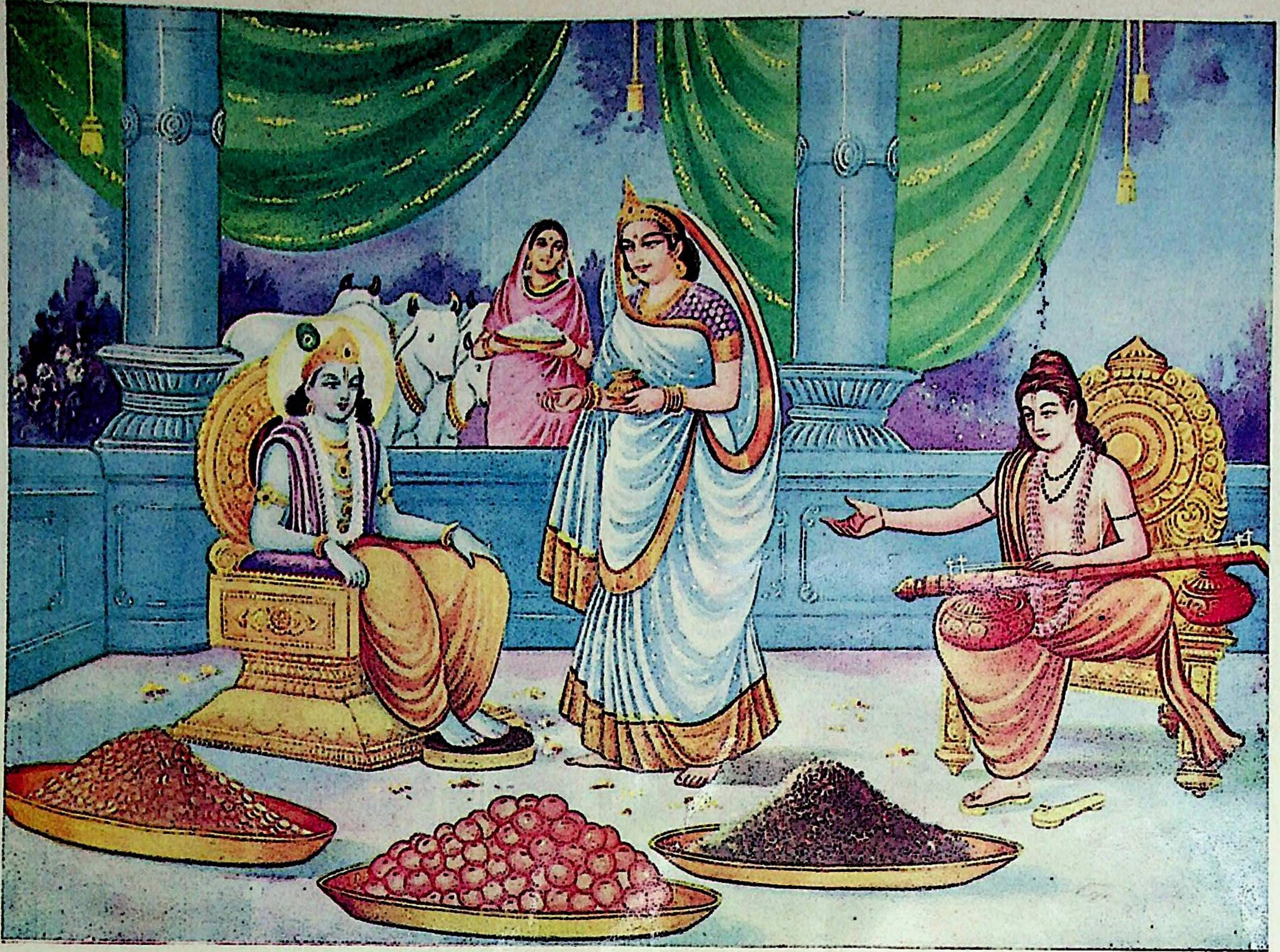
Satyabhama gives Krishna to Narada as a gift.

The legend of the tulabharam is a folktale from Odisha, and is absent in the major scriptures pertaining to Krishna's life. In the tale, Satyabhama is regarded to have prided herself on the love Krishna had for her, and her grasp over his heart. On one contrived occasion, the sage Narada arrived in Dvaraka, and during the course of a conversation, hinted to Satyabhama that the love that Krishna's favourite wife was Rukmini, and not her. Angered by his remark, Satyabhama challenged Narada to prove it. Narada, with his way with words, tricked her into accepting a vrata ritual, where she had to give Krishna away in charity to Narada, and reclaim him by offering the weight of Krishna in wealth. Narada is said to have persuaded her into accepting this vrata by telling her that Krishna's love for her would increase multifold if she succeeded in the tulabharam.

The scene was soon set for the vrata. Satyabhama gave Krishna away in charity, in spite of the other wives' pleadings. Krishna agreed to sit by and watch the proceedings unfold. After donating Krishna to Narada, Satyabhama arranged for a big scale (tula) to be put up, and sent for her huge treasure of gold and jewellery. The scales did not budge. Narada warned her that if she was unable to balance the scales, he would be forced to auction Krishna as a slave to someone else. Satyabhama, in frantic panic, swallowed her pride, and begged all the other wives to give up their jewels. The entire weight of the jewellery of Krishna's wives did not succeed in balancing the scales. In the end, Rukmini was able to resolve the situation by offering a single tulasi leaf upon the other scale, after chanting a prayer, which balanced the scales. This legend is often interpreted to demonstrate that one's devotion matters more than material offerings. While there are different versions in different texts as to why the weighing was arranged, the story of the tulasi leaf placed by Rukmini being worth more in weight than that of Satyabhama's wealth is a common ending.

This episode is also recounted in the Devi Bhagavata Purana:

Satyabhama tied down Hari against a tree and presented Him as a gift to Narada; afterwards she, the passionate woman, freed Krishna on paying an equivalent of gold coins. - chapter 25, book 4, Devi Bhagavata Purana.

=== Mahabharata ===
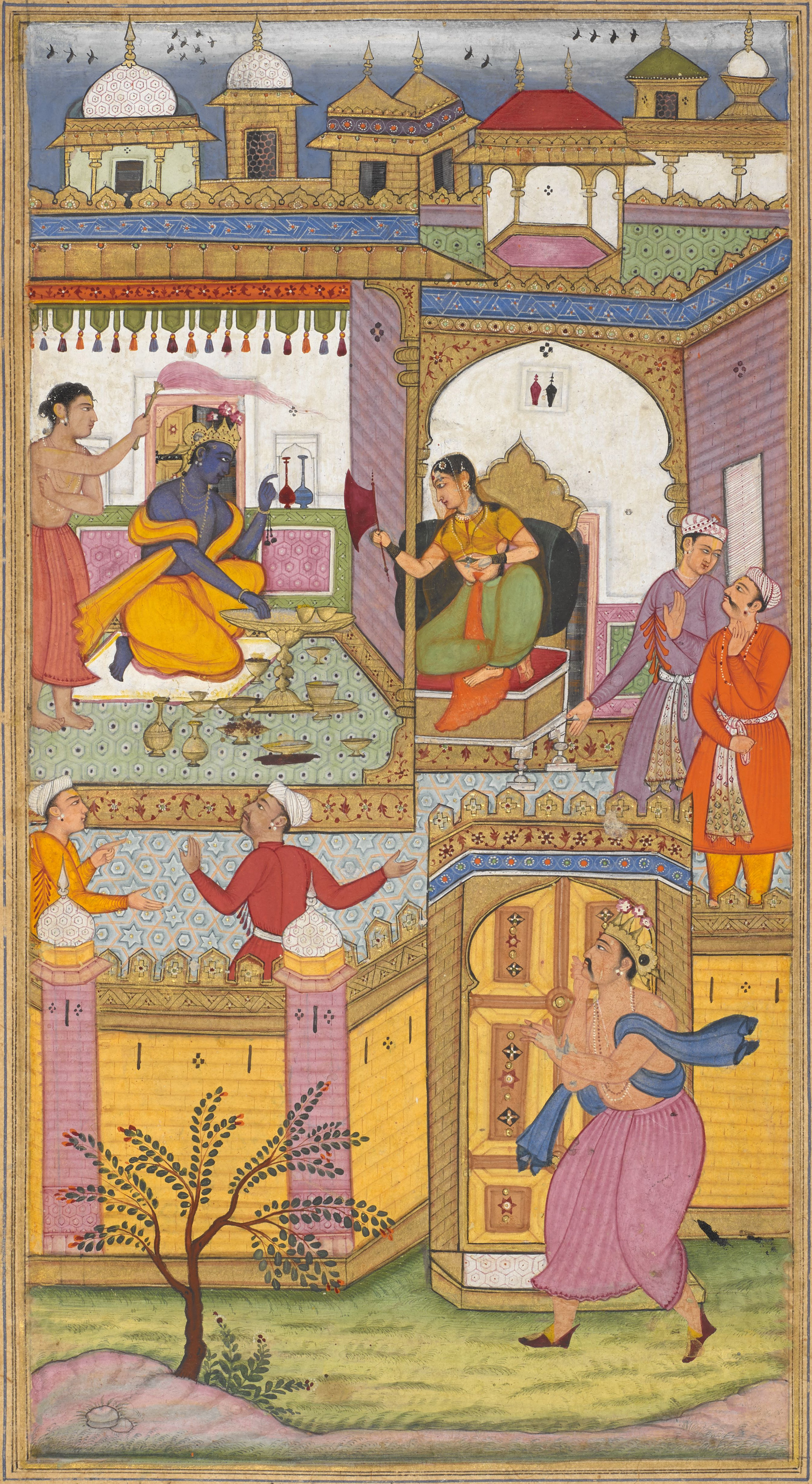
Bhima comes to Dwarka to invite Krishna to Yudhisthira's Ashvamedha sacrifice. Krishna is being served by Satyabhama. From illustrated Persian Razmnama manuscript by Naqib Khan and illustrated by Bhawani, 1598.

The Vana Parva, Book 3 of the Mahabharata, shows the friendship between Satyabhama and Draupadi. Krishna and Satyabhama visit Pandavas and Draupadi in the forest of Kamyaka. When the two women were alone, Satyabhama asks several questions of Draupadi about her married life or 'stridharma'. Draupadi, then, advises her and shares the secrets to a content marriage from her experience. Some of the themes which the two women discuss are: family, relationships, respect, work, etc.

In the Ashvamedha Parva, when Bhima arrived in Dvaraka to give the invitation of an ashvamedha to Krishna, Bhima was served by Satyabhama.

=== Penance ===
Satyabhama and few other dear wives of Krishna entered the woods, resolved to set themselves to the practice of penances. They began to live on fruits and roots and pass their time in the contemplation of Hari. Going beyond the Himavat, they took up their abode in a place called Kalpa.

== In Jainism ==
In Jain narrative literature, Satyabhama appears in the Krishna–Pradyumna cycle, especially in Jinasena's Harivaṃśapurāṇa and later works such as Somakirti's Pradyumna-caritra. Unlike the Vaishnava portrayal of Satyabhama as an incarnation of Bhudevi, the Jain account presents her primarily as Krishna's chief queen, or pattarani, and as a daughter of a Vidyadhara.

The Pradyumna-caritra makes Satyabhama's beauty, learning and pride important causes of later events. Narada visits Krishna's inner palace and sees Satyabhama seated on Krishna's throne, looking into a mirror and adorning herself. When she reacts contemptuously to Narada's ascetic appearance reflected near her face, Narada resolves to humble her pride. Rather than abducting her or falsely accusing her, he chooses co-wife rivalry as his means, leading to the introduction of Rukmini in the Jain Pradyumna narrative.

Later Jain episodes connect Satyabhama's household with Pradyumna's (Son of Rukimini) adventures. Pradyumna disrupts marriage arrangements involving Satyabhama's sons and uses vidya-based magical stratagems that repeatedly humble Satyabhama's side. These stories present Satyabhama less as a goddess of the earth and more as a royal Jain narrative figure through whom themes of pride, rivalry, karma and magical power are explored.

== In popular culture ==
=== Bhama Kalapam ===
'Bhama Kalapam' is a Kuchipudi dance-drama that narrates the story of Satyabhama. Traditionally, every Brahman in the village of Kuchipudi was expected to perform the role of Satyabhama at least once in a lifetime. In a sequence of the play, the dancer is introduced as Satyabhama and claims that she is the most beautiful and intelligent wife of Krishna. This is known to be the Patra Pravesa Daruvu.

=== Sathyabhama (1963 film) ===
'Satyabhama' is Indian Malayalam-language film, directed by M. S. Mani and produced by T. E. Vasudevan.

=== Krishnavataram (2026 film) ===
In the 2026 film, 'Krishnavtaram', Satyabhama is played by actress Sanskruti Jayana.
