= Akrura =

Uncle of Krishna in Hinduism

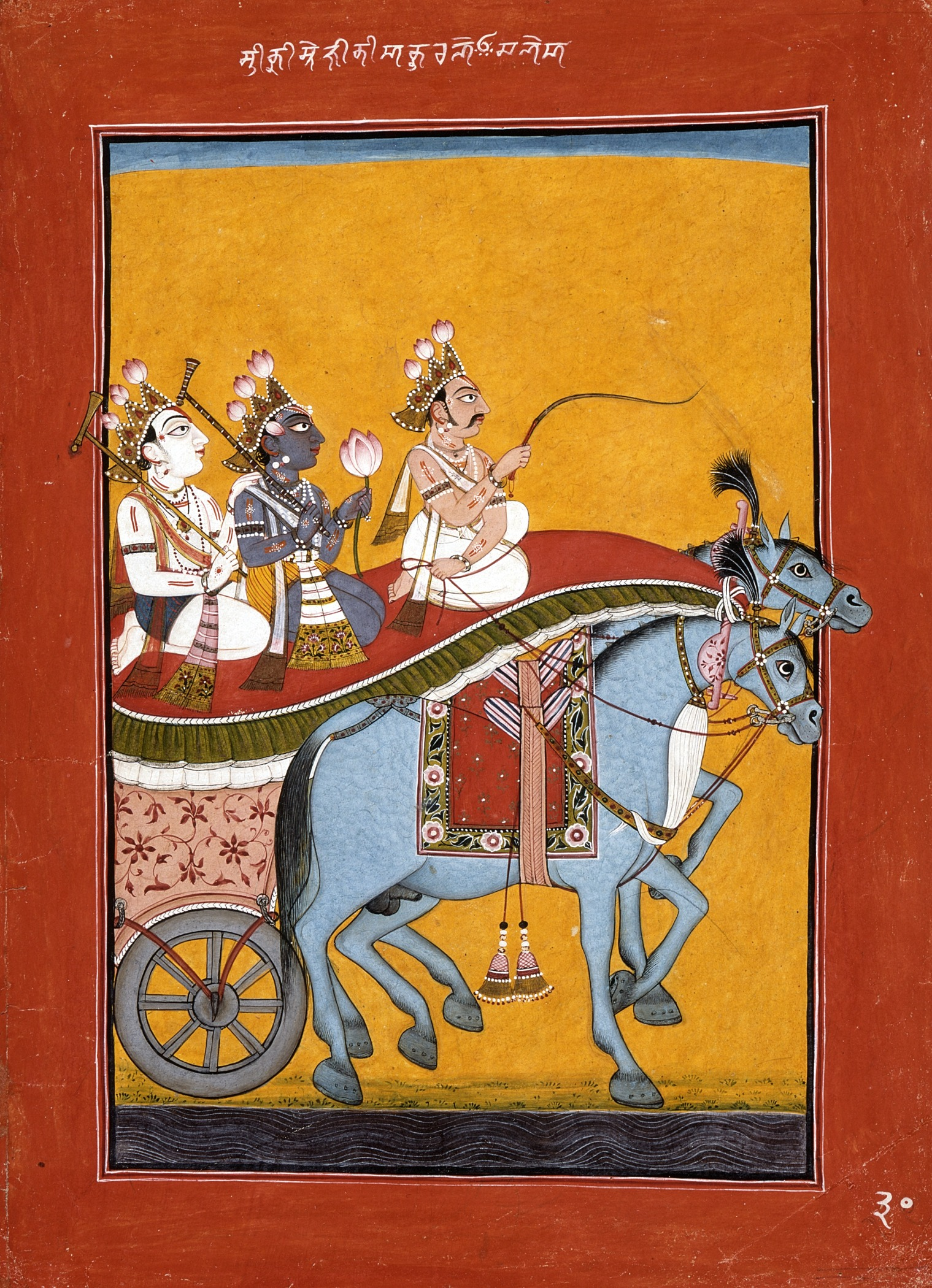
- Akrura (right) drives Krishna and Balarama to Mathura. Folio from the Bhagavata Purana.
- Texts: Puranas, Mahabharata

Genealogy
- Parents: Śvaphalka (father), Gandini or Nandinī (mother)
- Siblings: Upasanja, Mangu, Mridura, Arimejaya, Girikshipa, Upiksha, Shatruha, Arimardana, Dharmabhrit, Yatidharma, Gridhra, Bhoja, Andhaka, Suvahu, and Prativahu (brothers), Sundari (sister)
- Spouse: Ugraseni
- Children: Sudeva and Upadeva (sons)
- Dynasty: Yaduvamsha

Akrura (Sanskrit: अक्रूर, romanized: Akrūra, lit. 'not cruel') is a Yadava prince in Hinduism, best known for being the uncle of the deity Krishna. The son of Śvaphalka and Gandini, a daughter of the king of Kashi, he is instructed by Kamsa to drive his nephews, Krishna and Balarama, to a Dhanuryāga (festival of arms) at Mathura, where they were to be slain. He bears witness to the vishvarupa (theophany) of Krishna during this journey. Akrura becomes the owner of the Syamantaka jewel after the death of its previous owner, Satrajit. He is slain during the internecine Yadu massacre at Prabhasa.

== Legend ==
According to the Harivamsha, Akrura marries Ugraseni, the daughter of Ugrasena, who gives birth to two sons, Sudeva and Upadeva. F.E. Pargiter states that Akrura weds Sutanu, the daughter of Ahuka, and with her he had two sons, Devaka and Updevaka. He is said to have reigned at Dvaraka, and Pargiter believes that the family's chiefdom stretched as far back as Vrishni.

=== Charioteer of Krishna and Balarama ===
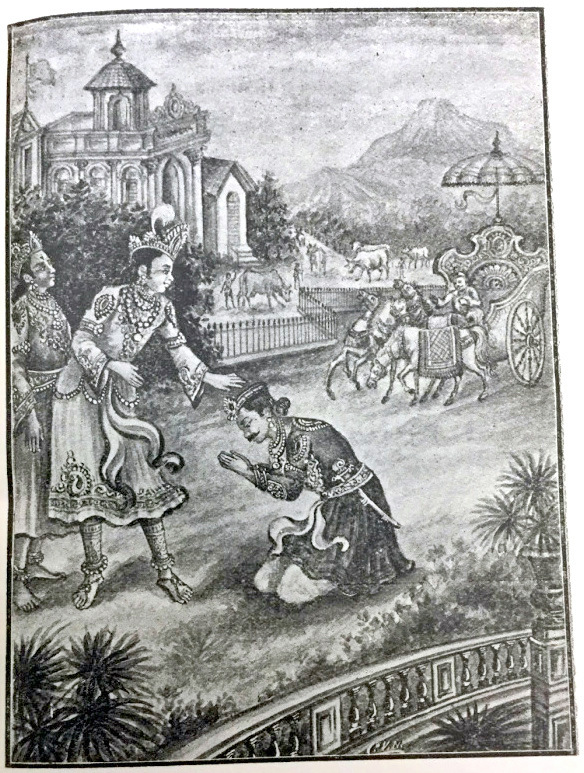
Ambassador Akrura meeting Krishna at Gokulam with a message from Kamsa

Akrura's cousin, Kamsa, ruled as the king of the Yadus, based in his capital at Mathura. In the Vishnu Purana, prophesied to be killed by his nephew, Krishna, he ordered Akrura to summon Krishna and Balarama upon his chariot to Mathura. An invitation was to be issued, under the pretext of inviting them to the Dhanuryāga festival, to be held on the fourteenth day of the lunar month, where he schemed to have them murdered. Kamsa informed Akrura that following the death of his nephews, he wished to seize all the possessions of the cowherds, and rule in concert with him. As a devotee of Vishnu, Akrura was excited at the prospect of meeting Krishna. After his arrival to Gokulam, he saw Krishna and his brother among the cattle, wondering if they would despise him for his association with Kamsa. The brothers, however, treated their uncle with hospitality, and he proceeded to tell them about the mistreatment of Vasudeva, Devaki, and Ugrasena under the tyranny of Kamsa, and the reason for which he had been dispatched. The brothers agreed to accompany Akrura to Mathura the following day. The milkmaids lamented the departure of Krishna from Vraja, calling Akrura cruel for taking him away from them. During their journey, Akrura bathed in the waters of the Yamuna, where he witnessed the celestial forms of Balarama as Shesha and Krishna as Vishnu, and eulogised them. Reaching Mathura, he informed them that they would have to walk the royal road from that point forward, and he proceeded ahead alone in his chariot.

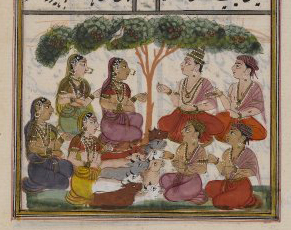
Akrura speaks to the gopis

=== Possession of the Syamantaka ===
The Harivamsha states that Akrura obtained the legendary jewel called the Syamantaka after it was given to him for safekeeping by Shatadhanva. Shatadhanva had slain Satrajit, the previous owner of the jewel, and had given it to Akrura, as he had expressed a desire to obtain it in the past. Akrura promised Shatadhanva that he would not part with the jewel. Shatadhanva assured Akrura of his protection if Krishna attacked him. Even as Shatadhanva was slain by Krishna, Akrura commenced a great sacrifice called the Akrura Yajna, where he offered enough jewellery and articles of wealth generated from the jewel to last sixty-thousand years. Krishna caught wind of these events, and wished Akrura to return the Syamantaka to him at Dvaraka. Akrura offered the Syamantaka, as well as the hand in marriage of his sister, Sushila, to Krishna. Pleased, Krishna allowed Akrura to keep the jewel.

=== Meeting Dhritarashtra ===
In the Bhagavata Purana, Krishna sent Akrura to Hastinapura to meet Dhritarashtra, the king of the Kurus, to determine if the monarch was being influenced by his son, Duryodhana. Having arrived at Hastinapura, Akrura met Kunti, his cousin, who tearfully enquired if Krishna still remembered her, and told him that she had sought salvation in the deity. Akrura met the Kuru king, and spoke to him regarding his partiality towards the Kauravas, as well as his conduct in occupying the throne rather than install Yudhisthira as the rightful king. Dhritarashtra admitted that he was being partial towards his sons, though he still regarded Krishna to be God. Having gathered the king's thoughts, Akrura departed Hastinapura to inform Krishna of his visit.

== Veneration ==
Akrura with Krishna and Balarama, Gopi Nath Temple

=== Akrura Ghat ===
Akrura Ghat is one of the bathing ghats at Vrindavan, in the Mathura district. This is the place where Krishna and Balarama are believed to have revealed their forms of Vishnu and Shesha to Akrura. The text Adi Varaha Purana illustrates Akrura Ghat as the king of all holy places.

One of the major attractions is an ancient Gopi Nath temple dedicated to Krishna and Balarama. Akrura is depicted standing in between the two. It is believed that one can eradicate all his sins by bathing here during a full moon.
