= Satrajit =

Father of Satyabhama in Hinduism

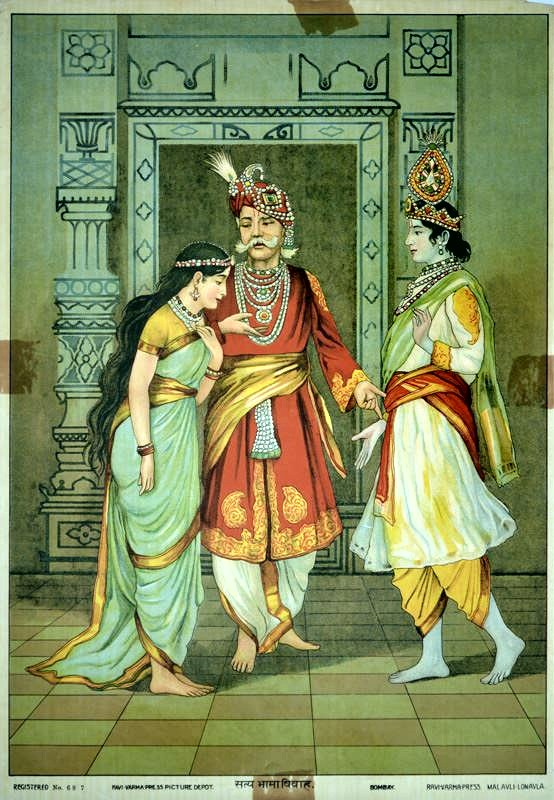
- Satrajit giving daughter Satyabhama to Krishna

Information
- Family: Nighna (father); Prasena (brother)
- Children: Satyabhama, Bratini, Prasvapini (daughters); Bhangakara, Batapati, Viyatsnata and others (sons)
- Texts: Bhagavata Purana, Harivamsa
- Dynasty: Yaduvamsha

Satrajit (Sanskrit: सत्राजित, romanized: Satrājita), also rendered Satrajita, is a Yadava king in Hinduism. He had ten wives and, from them, had, hundred sons, named, Bhangakara, Batapati, Viyatsnata and others, and three daughters, named Satyabhama, Bratini, and Prasvapini who were all married to Krishna. He is described to be a great devotee of Surya, the sun god. He is known for his role in the legend of the Syamantaka jewel.

== Legend ==
=== Gaining the Syamantaka ===
The Bhagavata Purana narrates that Satrajit was a great devotee of sun god, Surya. Greatly pleased, Surya offered him the dazzling Syamantaka as a present, which had the power of conferring great wealth upon its owner. When Satrajit wore the jewel, its brilliance was such that he was often mistaken as the sun god himself. During a meeting, Krishna asked Satrajit to let King Ugrasena have the jewel, so that it could be used for the good of all men. Proud of his possession, Satrajit refused to part with the Syamantaka Jewel.

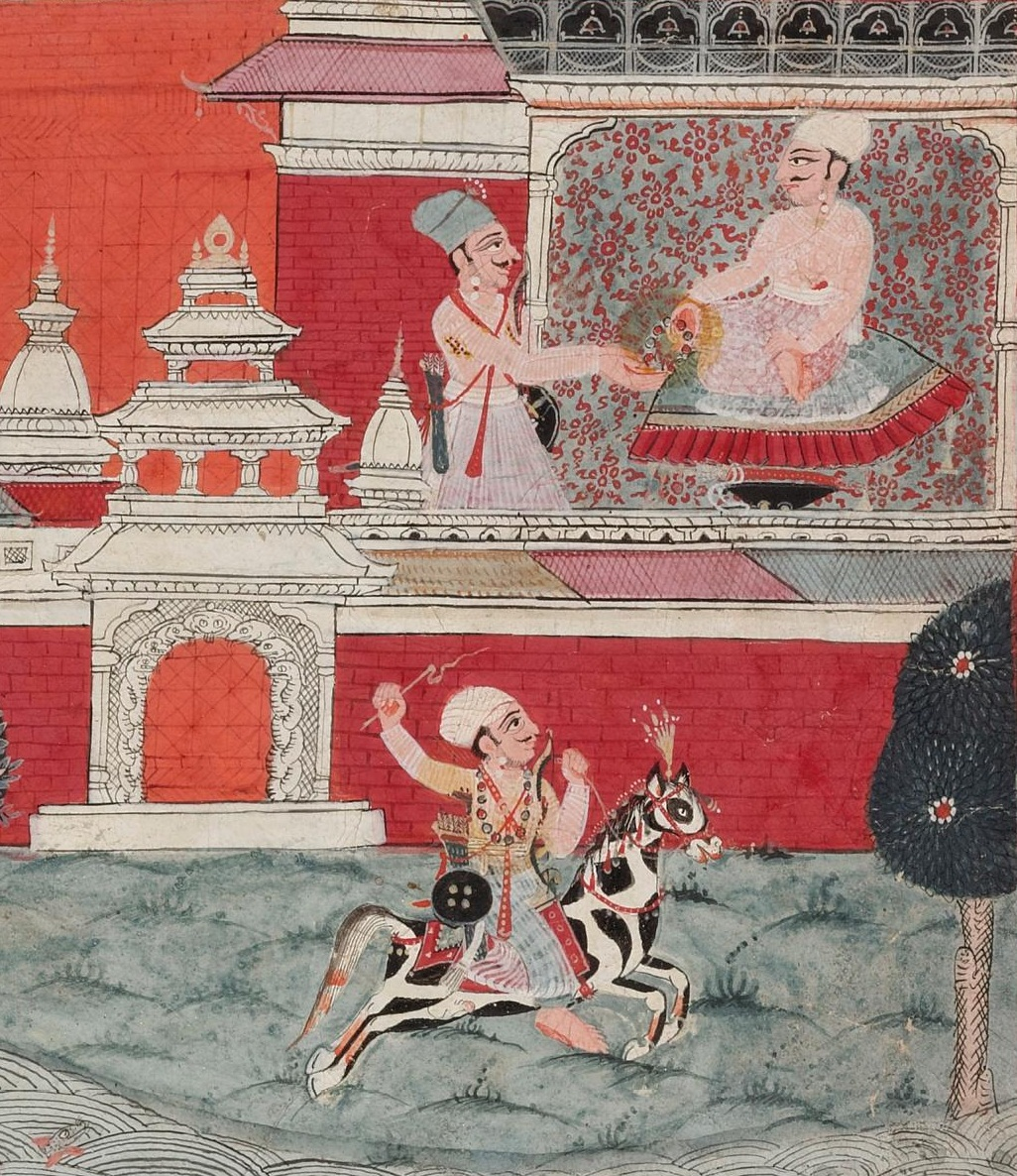
Satrajit and Prasena with the Syamantaka.

=== Disappearance of the jewel ===
One day, Satrajit's brother, Prasena, borrowed the jewel from Satrajit, and went hunting in a forest. However, a lion killed him, took the jewel, and headed into a cave. The cave was owned by Jambavan, the immortal king of the bears. Jambavan killed the lion and took the jewel for himself, offering it to his son as a toy. When he did not hear news of his brother, Satrajit suspected that his brother must have been killed for the jewel, and suspected Krishna of committing the vile deed. The rumour spread, and Krishna set out to recover the jewel himself in vindication.

=== Recovery and marriage of Satyabhama ===
Learning that Prasena had been slain by a lion, which had in turn been killed by a bear on the side of a mountain, Krishna entered the bear's den. He discovered that the jewel was being used as a toy by a child. Hearing the child's nurse scream at the sight of the intruder, an enraged Jambavan attacked Krishna. They fought for 28 days and nights, before Jambavan finally realised that Krishna was Rama's reincarnation. Awestruck, he glorified Krishna, and offered the Syamantaka, as well as his daughter, Jambavati, in marriage to the deity. Krishna accepted both of them, and offered moksha to the bear king. He summoned Satrajit to a royal assembly, and narrated the tale of the recovery of the Syamantaka. He restored the jewel to the hands of the Yadu king. Deeply ashamed of his accusation, Satrajit decided to offer Krishna the hand of his daughter, Satyabhama, regarded to be a 'jewel among women', as well as the Syamantaka. Krishna married Satyabhama, but declined to receive the jewel, regarding it to be the property of Satrajit, as its donor had been Surya.

=== Death ===
The Bhagavata Purana narrates that three Yadava warriors, named Kṛtavarmā, Akrura, and Śatadhanvā, were captivated by the jewel's glory, and wanted it for themselves. One night, when Satrajit was asleep, they killed him, and took the jewel. Krishna and Balarama later avenged Satrajit's death by killing Śatadhanvā, but realised that the jewel was not in his possession. Krishna performed the funeral rites of his father-in-law but soon discovered that Śatadhanvā had deposited the jewel with Akrura, and the latter had been performing religious sacrifices upon golden altars for days on end. Krishna summoned Akrura to Dvaraka, who brought the jewel wrapped up in a piece of cloth. He handed Syamantaka over to the deity in the presence of his clansmen, thereby vindicating him of any accusation of its theft. Observing that the Syamantaka was claimed by several individuals, including Satrajit's daughter, Satyabhama, he returned the jewel back to Akrura's possession.
