= Syamantaka =

Hindu mythological jewel

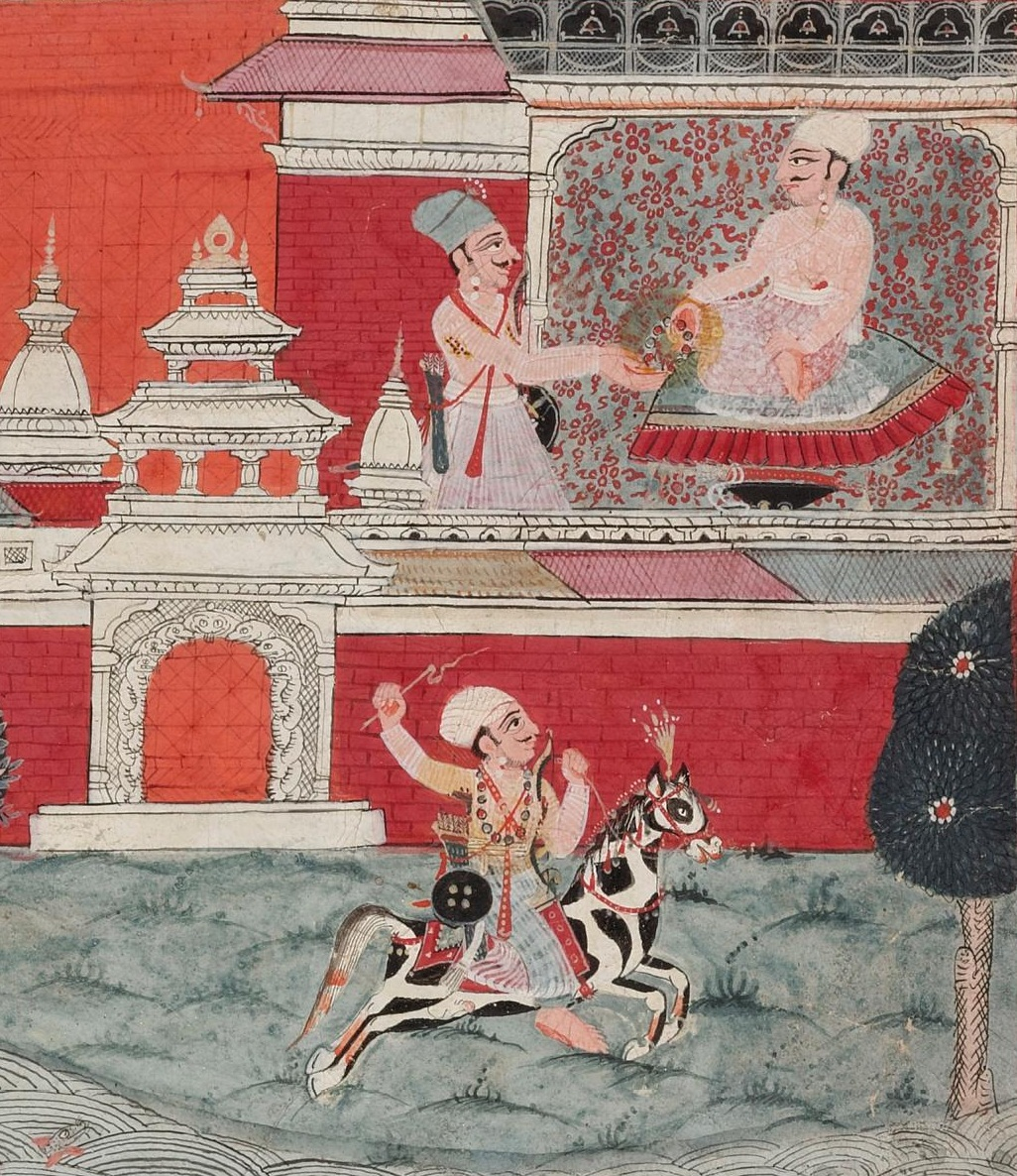
- Satrajita offers the jewel to Prasena
- Affiliation: Surya, Satrajita, Jambavan, Krishna, Akrura, Shatadhanva
- Texts: Vishnu Purana, Padma Purana

The Syamantaka (Sanskrit: स्यमन्तक, romanized: Syamantaka) is a legendary jewel featured in Hindu literature, regarded to be blessed with magical powers. It is described to be a ruby. The jewel is said to protect its owner if they were virtuous and good, but bring evil to them if they were not.

== Origin ==
The story of the Syamantaka jewel appears in the Vishnu Purana and the Bhagavata Purana. The jewel originally belonged to Surya, the Sun god. who wore it around his neck. It was said that whichever land possessed this jewel would never encounter any calamities such as droughts, earthquakes, floods or famines, and would always be full of wealth and prosperity. Wherever the jewel would gave the owner eight bhāras of gold daily. ("Four rice grains are called one guñjā; five guñjās, one paṇa; eight paṇas, one karṣa; four karṣas, one pala; and one hundred palas, one tulā. Twenty tulās make up one bhāra.") Since there are about 3,700 grains of rice in an ounce, the Syamantaka jewel was producing approximately 170 pounds (77 kg) of gold every day. It was also the source of the brilliant appearance of the sun god.

== Gift from the solar deity ==
One day, Satrajita, a Yadava king, and a devotee of Surya Deva, the sun god was walking along the sea shore, praying ardently, when the god himself appeared before him. Seeing the god in an indistinct and fiery shape, Satrajita asked him to appear in a lesser form of glory, so that he could see him clearly. For this, the sun god took the Syamantaka jewel off his neck, and Satrajita saw him possessing a fair person, with a body like burnished copper, and with slightly reddish eyes. Having offered his adorations, the sun god offered jewel to him as boon. When Satrajita returned to Dvaraka with the jewel, people mistook him for the sun god, such was his dazzling glory that even Krishna asked him to present the jewel to Ugrasena, the supreme leader of the Yadavas, but Satrajita did not comply.

== Theft and recovery ==
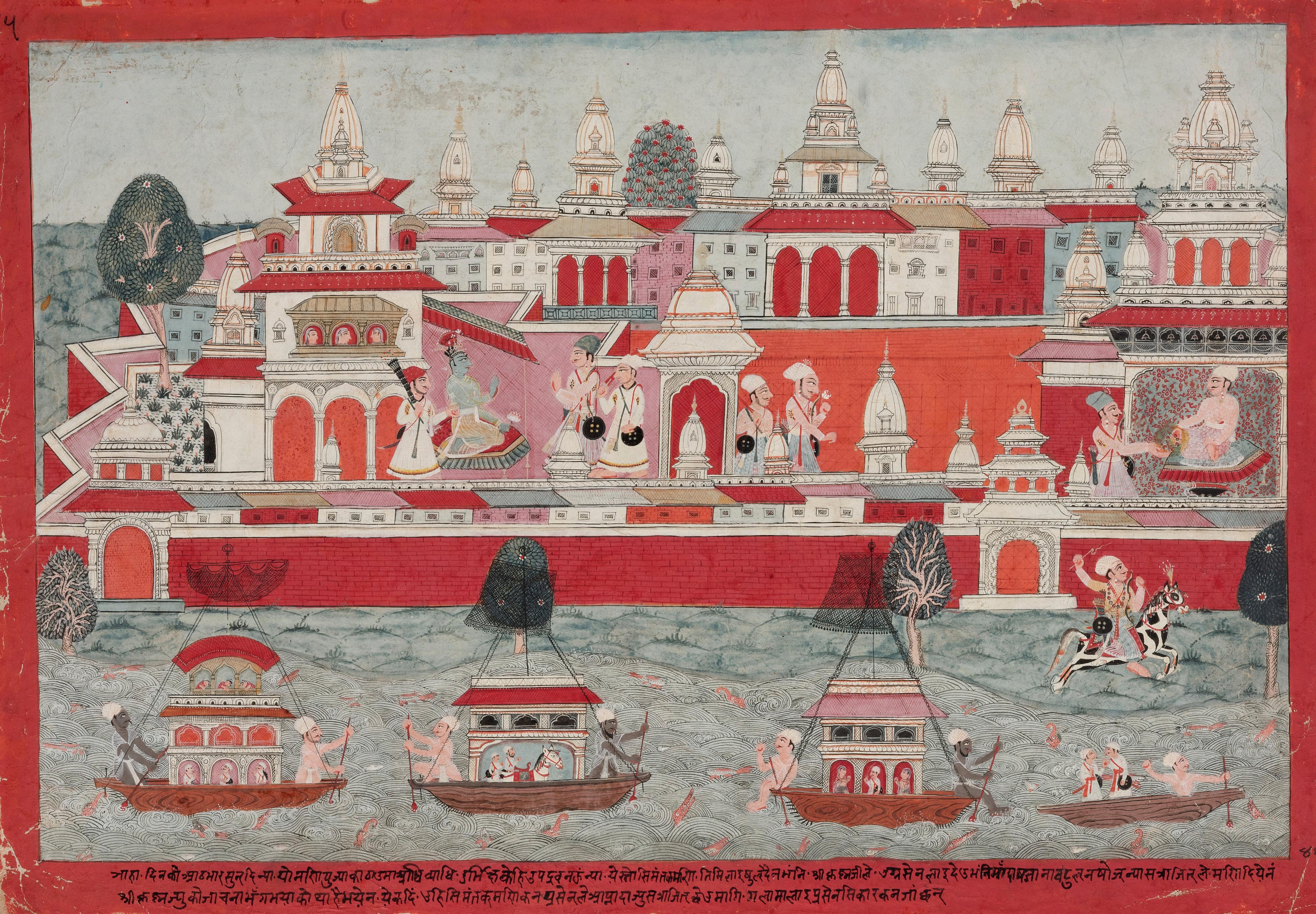
Satrajita and Prasena with the Symantaka Mani

Satrajita later presented the gem to Prasena, his brother, who was also the ruler of a Yadava province. Prasena wore it often, until once while hunting in the forest while wearing it, he was attacked by a lion, which killed him and fled with the jewel. But it could not get away with it, for shortly after, it was attacked by Jambavan, described as the king of the monkeys, who killed it after a fierce fight and took off with the gem. Jambavan was loyal to Rama, and was considered one of the seven immortals, or the Chiranjivi.

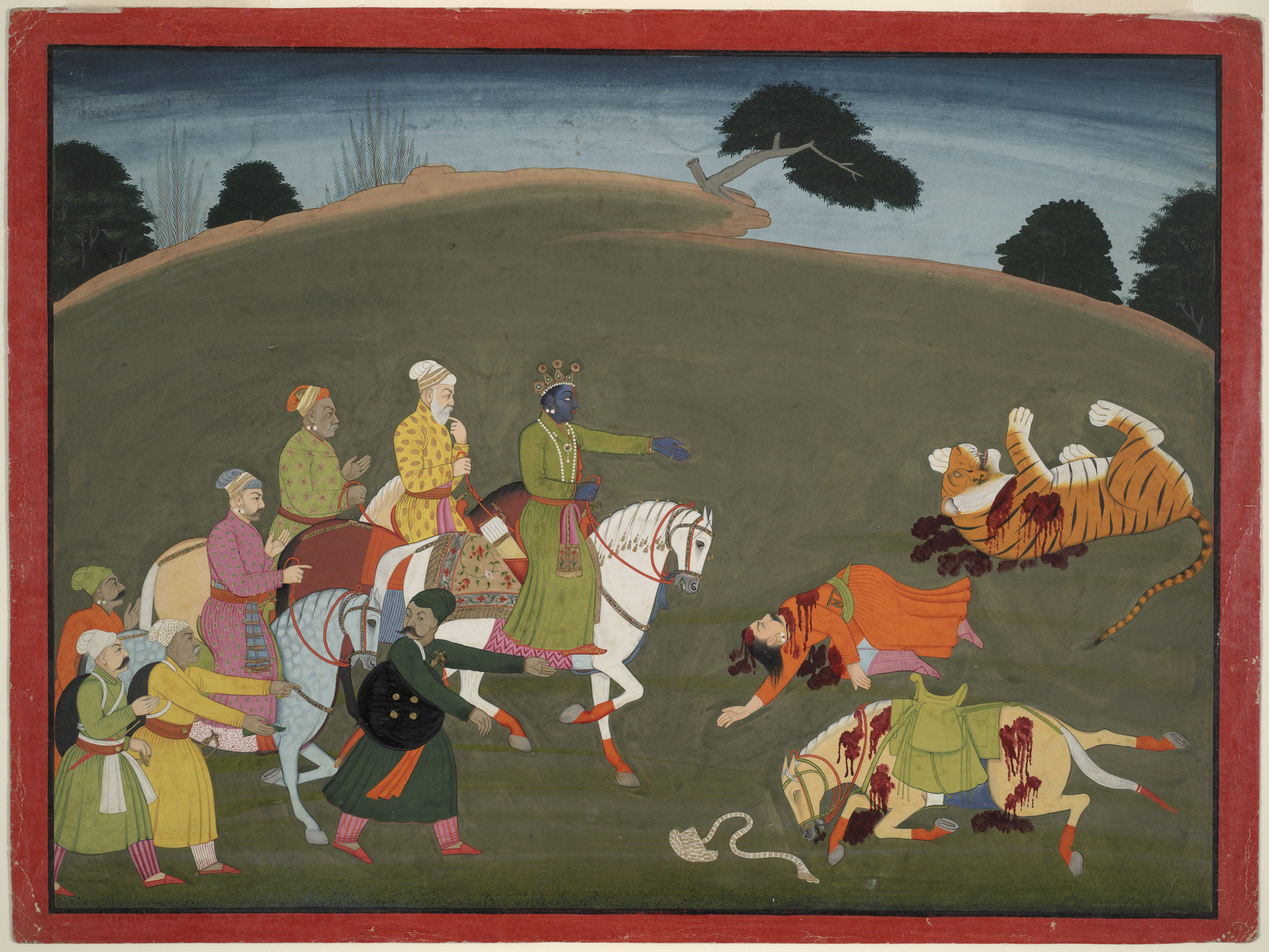
Krishna on horseback

Now, there was a rumour that Krishna also had his eye on the Syamantaka jewel, and when the incident of Prasena's mysterious disappearance became public, the people accused Krishna of murder and theft. In order to prove his innocence, Krishna sought to find out the true culprit and recover the jewel. As he followed on the trail of the deceased Prasena, he came to the spot where the corpses of Prasena and his horse still lay, along with pieces of teeth and nails of a lion. From there he followed the footsteps of the lion, which led him to the spot of the second struggle, where the corpse of the lion was lying. From there, he followed the tracks of a monkey, which finally led him to the entrance of Jambavan's cave, where the latter's children were playing with the priceless jewel. Thereafter, he engaged in furious, protracted combat with Jambavan for 28 days, and Jambavan gradually grew tired. As he was the strongest living entity at that time, he wondered who could be weakening him. It was then that Jambavan realised that he had been sparring with none other than Vishnu himself. Jambavan, who was hot-headed, but pious by nature, returned the jewel to Krishna, and also granted him the hand of his daughter in marriage, called Jambavati.

This episode is described in the Padma Purana:

Speaking like this, and bowing and repeatedly saluting the lord he politely seated him on a seat full of (i.e. decked with) many gems. He washed his feet resembling fresh lotuses with auspicious water; worshipped the descendant of Yadu with a (respectful offering called) madhuparka; properly honoured him with (i.e. by giving him) divine garments and ornaments; he gave him, of unlimited lustre, as his wife, his daughter endowed with beauty, named Jāmbavatī, a gem among girls. He also gave him the great gem called Syamantaka, along with other gems. Krishna, the delighted killer of his enemies, having married the girl there, affectionately gave that Jāmbavat final beatitude. Gladly taking that girl, his (i.e. Jāmbavat's) daughter, he went out of the cave and from it went to the city of Dvārakā. The best Yadu gave the gem called Syamantaka to Satrājit; and to that daughter (of Jāmbavat) also he gave an excellent gem.

— Padma Purana, Chapter 249

== Krishna's marriage to Satyabhama ==
Meanwhile, Krishna's companions, having waited twelve days for Krishna to come out of the cave, returned to Dvaraka, despondent. All of Krishna's friends and family members became extremely sorrowful and began regularly worshipping Goddess Lakshmi to assure the Lord's safe return. Even as they performed this worship, Krishna entered the city in the company of his new wife. He summoned Satrajita to the royal assembly, and, after said to him the entire story of the Syamantaka jewel's recovery, returned it to him. Satrajita accepted the jewel, but with great shame and remorse, He went back to his palace, and he decided to offer Krishna not only the jewel, but also his daughter, Satyabhama, so as to atone for the offense he had committed against the lord. Krishna accepted Satrajita's daughter, Satyabhama, who was endowed with all divine qualities. But he refused the jewel, returning it to King Satrajita.

== Murder of Satrajita ==
After a few days, Krishna and Balarama were off to Hastinapura after there were rumours that the Pandavas had been burnt to their deaths in a fire. Kritavarma, Akrura, and Shatadhanva, who had wished to wed Satyabhama themselves, conspired to make use of Krishna's absence from Dvaraka as an opportunity to steal the gem as revenge. Shatadhanva, one night, entered the house of Satrajita and killed him in his sleep, taking off with the jewel.

A sorrowful Satyabhama rushed to Hastinapura to inform Krishna about the ghastly death of her father. Krishna and Balarama immediately started for Dvaraka to avenge Satrajita's death, hearing of which Shatadhanva fled on his horse, placing the jewel with Akrura. He was chased down by Krishna and Balarama, and finally killed by Krishna in the outskirts of Mithila. Not finding the jewel, Krishna reported these tidings to his brother, who refused to believe him at first:

Krishna caught up with Shatadhanva and sliced off his head. But despite searching all Shatadhanva's belongings, he could not find the jewel. He came and reported this to Balarama. But unfortunately, Balarama did not believe this. He said, "Krishna, you are not a brother I would like to associate with. Go your own way and I will go mine. We do not belong together." Balarama went off to the kingdom of Videha and lived there as a guest of King Janaka. It was then that Duryodhana learnt from Balarama how to fight with the mace (gada). Krishna returned to Dvaraka. After three years had passed, Vabhru, Ugrasena, and the other Yadavas managed to convince Balarama that Krishna had indeed not stolen the jewel. Balarama then returned to Dvaraka.

— Vishnu Purana

Akrura and Kritavarma flee Dwaraka for Kashi.

Later, Krishna returned to Dvaraka, and upon realising that Akrura had already fled to Kashi with the Syamantaka jewel, summoned him, and asked him to admit his guilt. When Akrura complied, Krishna let him keep it, on the condition that it was to remain in the city of Dvaraka.

== Literature ==
The Bhagavata Puraṇa mentions the ruby in its chapters:

(SB10.34.30) Lord Govinda chased the demon wherever he ran, eager to take his crest jewel. Meanwhile Lord Balarāma stayed with the women to protect them.

(SB10.34.31) The mighty Lord overtook Śaṅkhacūḍa from a great distance as if from nearby, my dear King, and then with His fist the Lord removed the wicked demon's head, together with his crest jewel.

(SB10.34.32) Having thus killed the demon Śaṅkhacūḍa and taken away his shining jewel, Lord Kṛṣṇa gave it to His elder brother with great satisfaction as the gopīs watched.

(SB10.56.45) The Supreme Personality of Godhead told Satrājit: We do not care to take this jewel back, O King. You are the sun-god's devotee, so let it stay in your possession. Thus We will also enjoy its benefits.

== See also ==
- Balarama
- Bhagavatam
- Cintamani
- Kaustubha
- Kisshoutennyo (吉祥天女)
- Koh-i-noor diamond
- Krishna
- Shrivatsa
- Vishnu Purana
