= Jambavati =

Second queen consort of Hindu god Krishna

- Member of Ashtabharya
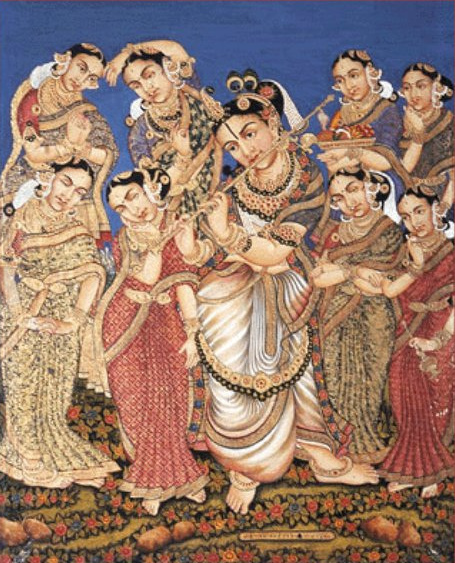
- Jambavati and the other Ashtabharya of Krishna, Mysore painting.
- Other names: Narendraputri, Rohini
- Affiliation: Devi, Ashtabharya, Lakshmi, Rohini, Rahi
- Abodes: Dvaraka
- Texts: Vishnu Purana, Mahabharata, Harivamsa, Srimad Bhagavatam

Genealogy
- Parents: Jambavan (father)
- Consort: Krishna
- Children: Samba, Sumitra, Purujit, Shatajit, Sahasrajit, Vijaya, Chitraketu, Vasuman, Dravida, and Kratu
- Dynasty: Yaduvamsha (by marriage)

Jambavati (Sanskrit: जाम्बवती, romanized: Jāmbavatī) is chronologically the second Ashtabharya of the Hindu god Krishna. She is the only daughter of the bear-king Jambavan. Krishna marries her when he defeats her father, Jambavan, in his quest to retrieve the stolen Syamantaka jewel.

== Nomenclature ==
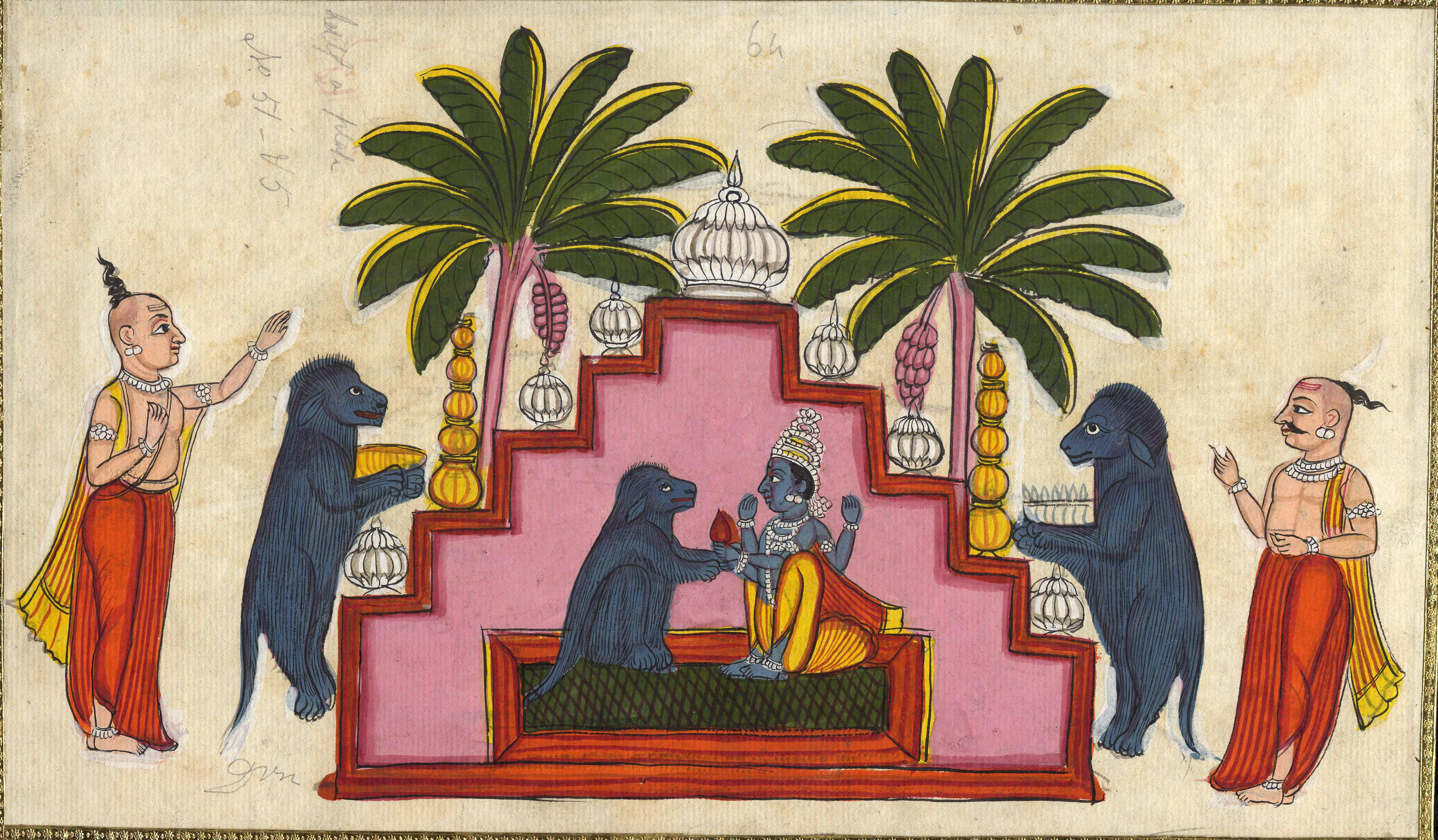
An artistic depiction of the wedding of Jambavati, where she is shown as a human-bear.

Jambavati, a patronymic, means daughter of Jambavan. Sridhara, a commentator on the Bhagavata Purana, identifies her with Krishna's wife Rohini. However, another commentator, Ratnagarbha, disagrees. The Harivamsa also suggests that Rohini may be an alternate name of Jambavati. Jambavati is also given the epithets Narendraputri and Kapindraputra.

== Legend ==
In the epic Mahabharata, Jambavan is introduced as Jambavati's father. The Bhagavata Purana and the Harivamsa calls him the king of bears.

Jambavati is an incarnation of the goddess Lakshmi, along with the junior wives of Krishna, as well as the Ashtabharya.

=== Marriage to Krishna ===
The marriage of Jambavati and Satyabhama to Krishna is closely linked with the story of Syamantaka, the precious jewel, which has its mention in the Vishnu Purana and the Bhagavata Purana. The precious jewel originally belonged to the sun-god, Surya. Surya, pleased with his devotee – the Yadava nobleman, Satrajit, gave him the dazzling gem as a gift. When Satrajit returned to the capital city of Dvaraka with the jewel, people mistook him for Surya because of his dazzling glory. Krishna, impressed by the lustrous stone, asked him to present the jewel to Ugrasena, Mathura's king and Krishna's grandfather, but Satrajit did not comply.

Subsequently, Satrajit presented the Syamantaka to his brother Prasena, who was a counsellor. Prasena, who wore the jewel often, was attacked by a lion one day while hunting in the forest. He is killed in a fierce battle, and the lion fled with the jewel. The lion failed to retain the jewel, as shortly after the battle, it enters Jambavan's mountain cave, only to get killed. Jambavan, who seized the glittering jewel from the clutches of the lion, gives it to his young son to play with.

Back in Dvaraka, following the disappearance of Prasena, it was rumoured that Krishna, who had an eye on the Syamantaka jewel, had Prasena murdered and stolen the jewel. Krishna, who was accused of this false allegation, went out with other Yadavas in search of Prasena to establish his innocence by finding the jewel. He followed the trail that Prasena had taken and discovered the corpses of Prasena. He then followed the trail of the lion and reached the cave, where the dead lion was lying. Krishna told his fellow Yadavas to wait outside, while he entered the cave alone. Inside he saw a little child playing with the priceless jewel. As Krishna approached Jambavan's son, the child's nanny cried aloud, alerting Jambavan. The two then engaged in furious combat for 27–28 days (as per Bhagavata Purana) or 21 days (as per Vishnu Purana). As Jambavan gradually grew tired, he realized that Krishna was none other than his benefactor Rama from the Treta Yuga. In gratitude and devotion to Krishna who spared his life, Jambavan gave up his fight and returned the jewel to Krishna. Jambavan offered his maiden daughter Jambavati in marriage to Krishna, along with the Syamantaka jewel. Krishna accepted the proposal and married Jambavati. They then moved to Dvaraka.

Meanwhile, Yadavas who accompanied Krishna to the cave had returned to the kingdom presuming Krishna as dead. Every member of the royal family had assembled to mourn his death. After returning to Dvaraka, Krishna narrated the story of the recovery of the jewel and his marriage to Jambavati. He then returned the jewel to Satrajit in the presence of Ugrasena. Satrajit felt shy and ashamed to receive it, as he had realized his error of judgment and his greediness. He then offered his daughter Satyabhama in marriage to Krishna, along with the precious jewel. Krishna married Satyabhama, but refused the gem.

=== Birth of Samba ===
The Mahabharata and the Devi Bhagavata Purana narrate a story of the birth of Samba, Jambavati's chief son. Jambavati was unhappy when she realized that only she had not borne any children to Krishna while all the other wives had many children. She approached Krishna to find a solution and to be blessed with a son like the handsome Pradyumna, Krishna's first-born son from his chief wife Rukmini. Then Krishna went to the hermitage of the sage Upamanyu in the Himalayas and as advised by the sage, he started to pray to the god Shiva. He did penance for six months in various postures; once holding a skull and a rod, then standing on one leg only in the next month and surviving on water only, during the third month he did penance standing on his toes and living on air only. Pleased with the austerities, Shiva finally appeared before Krishna as Ardhanarishvara, the half-female-half-male form of the god, asked him to ask a boon. Krishna then sought a son from Jambavati, which was granted. A son was born soon thereafter who was named Samba, after the form Shiva had appeared before Krishna.

=== Children ===
According to the Bhagavata Purana, Jambavati was the mother of Samba, Sumitra, Purujit, Shatajit, Sahasrajit, Vijaya, Chitraketu, Vasuman, Dravida, and Kratu. The Vishnu Purana says that she has many sons headed by Samba.

Samba grew up to be a nuisance to the Yadavas, Krishna's clan. His marriage to Lakshmana, the daughter of Duryodhana (the head of the Kauravas) ended up in his capture by Duryodhana. He was finally rescued by Krishna and his brother Balarama. Samba once pretended to be a pregnant woman and his friends asked some sages who would raise the child. Offended by the mischief, the sages cursed that an iron pestle will be born to Samba, and would destroy the Yadavas. The curse came true, leading to the death of Krishna's clan in the Mausala Parva.

=== Death ===
After the disappearance of Krishna, Jambavati along with Rukmini and other ladies ascended the funeral pyre.

== In Buddhism ==
In Buddhist literature, Jambāvatī or Campāvatī is the beloved chief queen of Vāsudeva of the Kaṇhāyana clan (Krishna) in Dvāravatī and the mother of King Sivi.

She is mentioned in the Mahā-Ummagga Jātaka (Jātaka No. 546), where Mahosadha (a previous birth of the Bodhisatta) cites her union with Vāsudeva as a precedent to defend his own marriage to Amarā, a woman of humble village birth, against the scorn of rival royal counselors. Jambāvatī is said to be a caṇḍālī (an outcaste woman) of extraordinary beauty. According to the narrative, Vāsudeva encountered her along the road while traveling from Dvāravatī to a royal park; captivated by her beauty, he married her despite her low social origin and elevated her to the rank of his chief queen consort.

== In popular culture ==
In Puranic literature, Jambavati has been an epic character in Bhagavata Purana, Mahabharata, Harivamsa, and Vishnu Purana. The legend of the fight between Jambavan and Krishna over the Syamantaka jewel has been prominently featured. The Vijayanagara emperor, Krishnadevaraya, composed a drama called the Jambava Kalyanam. Ekaramantha wrote a poem with the theme Jambavati Parinayam (meaning: Jambavati's marriage).
