= Jambavan =

Hindu mythological bear

- Bears
- Member of Chiranjivi
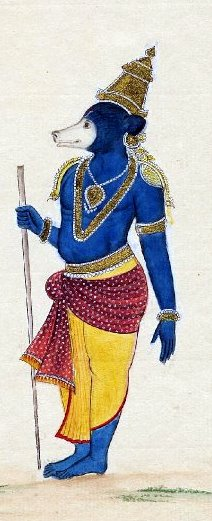
- Painting of Jambavan
- Affiliation: Hinduism
- Texts: Ramayana, Bhagavata Purana

Genealogy
- Siblings: Himavat, Narada
- Children: Jambavati (daughter)

Jambavan (Sanskrit: जाम्‍बवान्, IAST: Jāmbavān), also known as Jambavanta (Sanskrit: जाम्बवन्त, IAST: Jāmbavanta), is a bear warrior who fought in Rama-Ravana war in Hindu texts.

He emerged from the mouth of Brahma when the creator deity yawned. He assisted Rama, the 7th avatar of Vishnu in his quest to save his wife Sita from the rakshasa king Ravana. In the Ramayana, he helps Hanuman realise his potential, just before his famous leap over to the island of Lanka. Jambavan was present at the Samudra Manthana, and is supposed to have circled Vamana 21 times in a single leap, when he was acquiring the three worlds from Mahabali. He is considered to be one of the strongest divine beings of Hinduism.

Jambavan, together with Parashurama and Hanuman, is considered to be one of the few to have been present for the birth of both Rama and Krishna. His daughter Jambavati was married to Krishna.

== Nomenclature ==
Jambavan as depicted in traditional folk theater Yakshagana.

Jambavan is also known as:

- Jambavantan (Sanskrit)
- Jambavanta (জাম্বৱন্ত, Assamese)
- Jambavanta (ಜಾಂಬವಂತ, Kannada script)
- Jamvanta (Kannada script)
- Jāmbubān ‍(জাম্বুবান, Bangla)
- Champu (Khmer)
- Jembawan (Javanese)
- Jambuwana (Malay)
- Jāmbabān (Odia)
- Jambuvaan (Marathi)
- Jambavan (Malayalam)
- Jāmbavantudu (జాంబ వంతుడు, Telugu)
- Keeratuvan (Punjabi)
- Zabaman (Burmese)
- Sambuvan (சாம்புவன், Tamil)
- Chomphuphan (ชมพูพาน, Thai)

== Legends ==
=== Birth ===
In the beginning, when Brahma was sitting on the lotus from the navel of Vishnu, he started meditating and yawned, from which a bear was born, which later became Jambavan. It is said he was called Jambavan either because he was born on Jambudvipa, or because he was born while yawning. He was present at the time when Vishnu fought Madhu and Kaitabha. At the time of Ramayana, he was 6 manvantaras old.

=== Ramayana ===
In the epic Ramayana, Jambavan helped Rama find his wife Sita and fight her abductor, Ravana. It is he who makes Hanuman realise his immense capabilities, and encourages him to fly across the ocean to search for Sita in Lanka. Later, he accompanies the Vanara Army in the deadly war against demons of Lanka. He witnessed war as a strategist and physician not engaging in it directly but showed his might against Ravana and his son Indrajit. He pierced Indrajit’s chest with Indrajit’s own trident which he fired on Jambavan and threw him back to Lanka after he wounded Rama and Lakshmana with Nagapasha. He also kicked Ravana in his chest and fainted him, forcing him his charioteer to flee along with him. He also killed Ravana’s generals by crushing them under huge trees.

=== Mahabharata ===
In the Mahabharata, Jambavan had killed a lion, who had acquired a gem called syamantaka from Prasena, after killing him. Krishna was suspected of killing Prasena for the jewel, so he tracked Prasena's steps until he learned that he had been killed by a lion, who had been killed by a bear. Krishna tracked Jambavan to his cave, and a fight ensued. The combat between Krishna and Jambavan ensued for 27/28 days (per Bhagavata Purana) and 21 days (per Vishnu Purana), after which Jambavan began to grow tired. Realising who Krishna was, Jambavan submitted. He gave Krishna the gem, and also presented him his daughter Jambavati, who became one of Krishna's wives.

== Temple ==
The only temple of Jambuvanta is located at Jamkhed, in the Jalana district. His temple is in a cave on the hill north of Jamkhed. The temple is about 2 kilometres away from Jamkhed village.

Another temple known as "Jambuvant Gufa" located at Ranavav, Gujarat, India, where combat between Bhagvan Shree Krishna and Rikshraj Jambuvant happens.

== See also ==
- Vamana
- Sugriva
- Ramayana
