= Nartanasala (1963 film) =

1962 film by Kamalakara Kameshwara Rao

- Theatrical release poster
- Directed by: Kamalakara Kameswara Rao
- Written by: Samudrala Sr.
- Based on: Virata Parva of Mahabharata
- Produced by: C. Lakshmi Rajyam; C. Sridhar Rao
- Starring: N. T. Rama Rao; Savitri; S. V. Ranga Rao; Relangi
- Cinematography: M. A. Rehman
- Edited by: S. P. S. Veerappa
- Music by: Susarla Dakshinamurthi
- Production company: Rajyam Pictures
- Distributed by: Navayuga Films
- Release date: 11 October 1963
- Running time: 174 minutes
- Country: India
- Language: Telugu

Nartanasala (transl. The dance pavilion) is a 1963 Indian Telugu-language Hindu mythological film directed by Kamalakara Kameswara Rao and written by Samudrala Sr. It stars N. T. Rama Rao, Savitri, S. V. Ranga Rao, and Relangi while Mukkamala, Mikkilineni and Dandamudi Rajagopal play supporting roles among others. Susarla Dakshinamurthi composed the film's soundtrack and background score. M. A. Rahman and S. P. S. Veerappa served as the cinematographer and editor respectively. T. V. S. Sarma was the film's art director. The film was produced by actress C. Lakshmi Rajyam and her husband C. Sridhar Rao under the Rajyam Pictures banner.

Based on the Virata Parva of the Indian epic Mahabharata, Nartanasala focused on the trials of the Pandavas in the last year of their exile. The Pandavas assumed different identities and lived incognito in Virata's Matsya Kingdom. The Kauravas wished to reveal the Pandavas' real identities so that they would repeat another exile of 13 years in a cyclic fashion. The issues faced by the Pandavas and their wife Draupadi at Matsya due to various factors, notably Virata's brother-in-law Kichaka form the rest of the story.

The majority of Nartanasala's portions were filmed in the sets erected at Vauhini and Bharani studios in Madras (now Chennai). Produced with a budget of ₹4,00,000, Nartanasala was released on 11 October 1963 in 26 centers. The film was a commercial success, completing a 100-day run in 19 centers and a 200-day run in two centers. It was also dubbed into Bengali and Odia languages. Nartanasala won the National Film Award for Second Best Feature Film and the Filmfare Award for Best Film – Telugu. At the third Afro-Asian Film Festival held at Jakarta in 1964, Nartanasala received two awards: Best Male Actor (Ranga Rao) and Best Art Director (T. V. S. Sarma). For the April 2013 centennial of Indian cinema, News18 included Nartanasala in its list of "The 100 greatest Indian films of all time".

== Plot ==
Having lost their kingdom in a rigged game of dice, the Pandavas complete twelve years of Vanavasam and enter their mandatory thirteenth year, during which they must live incognito. Should their real identities be discovered by the Kauravas before the completion of this year on Vijayadashami, they are bound by the terms of the wager to repeat the entire thirteen-year exile cycle. Seeking refuge, the Pandavas enter the Matsya Kingdom, ruled by King Virata, and assume disguised roles: Yudhishthira becomes the royal advisor Kankubhattu; Bhima poses as the palace cook Vallava; Nakula serves as the horse groomsman Damagranthi; Sahadeva works as the cowherd Tantripala; Draupadi adopts the identity Sairandhri, a maid serving Queen Sudeshna; and Arjuna invokes a temporary curse to transform into the eunuch dance teacher Brihannala.

Concurrently, Lord Krishna permits Arjuna's son, Abhimanyu, to visit Matsya under strict instructions not to disclose his lineage. There, Abhimanyu falls in love with Virata's daughter, Uttara, a romance observed and encouraged by Brihannala. Meanwhile, Sudeshna's brother, the powerful army commander Kichaka returns victorious after a conquest and becomes obsessed with Sairandhri. When the latter rejects his advances, Kichaka forces Sudeshna into facilitating a meeting. Sairandhri alerts Vallava, who ambushes and slays Kichaka in the dark dance hall.

Vallava subsequently murders Kichaka's hundred brothers when they attempt to burn Sairandhri on his funeral pyre. News of Kichaka's death at the hands of mysterious "Gandharvas" leads the Kauravas to suspect that the Pandavas are hiding in Matsya. To flush them out, the Kauravas initiate a cattle-raiding invasion.

With the primary Matsya army deployed elsewhere, Prince Uttara Kumara marches out to face the invaders with Brihannala acting as his charioteer. Intimidated by the massive Kaurava army, Uttara Kumara panics, but Brihannala directs the chariot to a sacred Shami tree, retrieves the Pandavas' concealed divine weapons, and reveals his true identity as Arjuna, declaring that the incognito period has ended.

Using the Sammohanastra, Arjuna subdues the Kaurava forces, retrieves the stolen cattle, and safeguards Matsya. Following the victory, Krishna arrives to celebrate the completion of the exile and the wedding of Abhimanyu and Uttara.

== Cast ==
- N. T. Rama Rao as Arjuna and Brihannala (dual role)
- Savitri as Draupadi and Sairandhri
- S. V. Ranga Rao as Kichaka
- Relangi as Uttara Kumara
- Dandamudi Rajagopal as Bhima and Valala
- Mukkamala as Virata
- Mikkilineni as Dharma Raju and Kankubhattu
- Sobhan Babu as Abhimanyu
- Dhulipala as Duryodhana
- Prabhakar Reddy as Karna
- Satyanarayana as Dusaasana
- Allu Ramalingaiah as Vaalatulya
- Vangara as Assistant Cook
- Boddapati as Assistant Cook
- Balakrishna as Assistant Cook
- Ramakoti as Assistant Cook
- L. Vijayalakshmi as Uttaraa
- Sandhya as Sudeshna
- Padmini Priyadarshini as Urvasi

Cameo appearances

- Kanchanamala
- Suryakantham
- Kanta Rao as Krishna
- C. Lakshmi Rajyam as Subhadra
- Nellore Kantharao as Jeemutha Mallu

== Production ==
=== Development ===
Nartanasala was produced by an actress C. Lakshmi Rajyam and her husband C. Sridhar Rao under the banner Rajyam Pictures. The film's story was based on Virata Parva, one of the eighteen books of the Indian epic Mahabharata. Rajyam and Rao felt that barring Keechaka Vadham (1916—1918) (Note: While film historian S. Theodore Baskaran, film director R. K. Selvamani and professor Prem Chowdhry state the film release date as 1916, Suresh Chabria and Film News Anandan said the film was released in 1917. Film historians Randor Guy, S. Muthiah and professor Knut A. Jacobsen asserted the film was released in 1918.) and Vijayadasami (1937), no other Indian film dared to explore Virata Parva and found it a unique premise. Also, the belief that reading Virata Parva in Telugu-speaking lands would result in heavy rainfalls made the subject a culturally significant one. Samudrala Raghavacharya, better known as Samudrala Sr., wrote Nartanasala's script and Kamalakara Kameswara Rao was chosen to direct the film. Nartanasala was Kameswara Rao's first mythological film.

Susarla Dakshinamurthi composed the film's music; M. A. Rahman and S. P. S. Veerappa served as the cinematographer and editor, respectively. T. V. S. Sarma was the film's art director. Raavi Kondala Rao, one of the assistant directors, wrote the dialogue for the comedy portions on Kameswara Rao's insistence. He also added the character of Vaalatulya (played by Allu Ramalingaiah), which was absent in the original script. Though Kameswara Rao offered to credit Kondala Rao as the first assistant director, the makers altogether left his name out later.

=== Casting ===
Rajyam and Rao approached N. T. Rama Rao to play Arjuna's role in the film. Rama Rao was happy to play Arjuna, but was hesitant to take up Bruhannala's part; he felt that even a slight misstep would result in rejection by the audience. Rajyam assured that Sarma's sketches would help Rama Rao look authentic. Sarma designed the look based on eunuch statues in major temples and opted for Keralite hairstyles. Bengali makeup artist Haripada Chandra was signed to work on Rama Rao's work. After getting approval from his mentor K. V. Reddy on Bruhannala's look, Rama Rao agreed to be a part of the film's cast.

Savitri and S. V. Ranga Rao was signed to play the other key roles of Draupadi and Kichaka respectively. Mikkilineni, Dhulipala Seetarama Sastry, Mukkamala and Relangi played supporting roles. Wrestlers Dandamudi Rajagopal and Nellore Kantharao were signed to play Bhima and Jeemutha Mallu respectively. Kanta Rao made a brief appearance as Krishna and Rajyam played his sister Subhadra. Sobhan Babu and L. Vijayalakshmi were paired to play the couple Abhimanyu and Uttaraa. This was Sobhan Babu's first of two films where he portrayed the character of Abhimanyu, the other being Veerabhimanyu (1965). On Rajyam's insistence, actress Kanchanamala made a cameo appearance. She shared the screen with Suryakantham in the film. It was Kanchanamala's last on-screen appearance.

=== Filming ===
The majority of Nartanasala's portions were filmed in the sets erected at Vauhini and Bharani studios in Madras (now Chennai). All the musical instruments used in the film were borrowed from the Madras Sangeetha Vidyalaya. The war sequences in the climax portion were filmed at Gudur, a town in Andhra Pradesh; two cameras were simultaneously used to film the scenes. For the Gograhana (retrieving the kidnapped cows) episode, five thousand animals were brought with the help of Gogineni Venkateswara Rao. Nartanasala was produced on a budget of ₹4,00,000 with a runtime of 174 minutes.

When Raghavacharya fell ill, his son Samudrala Ramanujacharya (better known as Samudrala Jr.), wrote the monologue "Sandhaana Samayamidi Inkanu Sairandhri Raalede ..." (It is time for unison and Sairandhri hasn't turned up yet ...) for Ranga Rao. Since Bruhannala was a dance teacher and Vijayalakshmi, who played Uttaraa, was a trained classical dancer, Rama Rao took two-hour long daily lessons from the film's choreographer Vempati Pedha Satyam for a month. Satyam also held three-day rehearsals for Sobhan Babu with Vijayalakshmi to help him overcome his nervousness. For the scene where Sairandhri was tied to a pole and dragged on a cart, Kameswara Rao employed a body double. When the intended artist did not turn up, another was employed and the scene was filmed. This made Kameswara Rao remark, "so now we have a dupe for a dupe [sic]".

== Music ==
Susarla Dakshinamurthi composed the film's soundtrack and background score. Nartanasala's soundtrack, marketed by Saregama, consists of 21 tracks including songs, poems, and collection of selected dialogue from the film. Out of 21 songs produced, only nine are used in the film. Raghavacharya and Sri Sri penned the lyrics for the songs. P. V. Koteswara Rao of Bharani Studios worked on the re-recording and songs. RCA and Western Electric sound systems were used for the same.

The song "Salalitha Raaga Sudharasa" is based on the Kalyani raga of the carnatic music. The makers were initially reluctant with the song's classic nature and insisted to change it. When Dakshinamurthi and Raghavacharya completed work on a new version, Kondala Rao and Satyam requested the makers to retain the previous version. Dakshinamurthi chose musician M. Balamuralikrishna and Bangalore Latha to provide the vocals. The song "Jaya Gana Nayaka" is a ragamalika composition and is based on three ragas—Gambhiranata, Todi, and Punnagavarali.

Nartanasala is one of Dakshinamurthi's critically acclaimed works in Telugu cinema. M. L. Narasimham of The Hindu noted that Dakshinamurthi's "melodious" background score contributed largely to the film's success. "Salalitha Raaga Sudharasa" gained the status of a chartbuster, while "Janani Siva Kamini" gained recognition as a prayer song. Other successful songs of Nartanasala were "Dariki Raboku", "Sakhiya Vivarinchave", "Evarikosam Ee Mandahasam", and "Naravara O Kuruvara".

Track list
No.	Title	Lyrics	Singer(s)	Length
1.	"Jaya Gana Nayaka"	Samudrala Sr.	Ghantasala, S. Janaki	05:15
2.	"Dariki Raboku"	Samudrala Sr.	P. Susheela	03:01
3.	"Evarikosam Ee Mandahasam"	Sri Sri	Ghantasala, P. Susheela	03:05
4.	"Janani Siva Kaamini"	Samudrala Sr.	P. Susheela	03.54
5.	"Naravara O Kuruvara"	Samudrala Sr.	S. Janaki	04:13
6.	"Salalitha Raaga Sudharasa"	Samudrala Sr.	M. Balamuralikrishna, Bangalore Latha	05:19
7.	"Sakhiya Vivarinchave"	Samudrala Sr.	P. Susheela	02:43
8.	"Seelavati"	Samudrala Sr.	Bangalore Latha	04:56
Total length:				32:26

== Release and reception ==
I can understand Nartanasala or Mahamantri Thimmarasu having classical dances because one was mythological and the other historical. But Telugu producers insisted that if I acted in a film, there had to be a dance. In Gundamma Katha, for example, a dance was included at the last minute at the producer's insistence.

— Vijayalakshmi, in an interview with The Hindu in February 2015.

Nartanasala was released on 11 October 1963 in 26 centres. Navayuga Films acquired the film's distribution rights. Katragadda Narsaiah of Navayuga worked on the film's posters and publicity. The film was commercially successful, managing to have a theatrical run of 100 days in 19 centres and 200 days in Hyderabad and Vijayawada. According to The Hindu, Nartanasala's complete theatrical run lasted for 25 weeks. The film's Bengali and Odia dubbed versions were commercially successful on par with the original. Nartanasala was adjudged the second best feature film at the 11th National Film Awards. It won the Filmfare Award for Best Film – Telugu. At the 3rd Afro-Asian Film Festival held at Jakarta in 1964, Nartanasala received two awards: best male actor (Ranga Rao) and best art director (Sarma).

In its 87th volume released in 1966, the now-defunct magazine The Illustrated Weekly of India noted Kanchanamala's cameo appearance, stating, "her delivery was as flawless as in bygone days and the years had not robbed her of charm". Reviewing Nartanasala, the University of Iowa stated that the film "unfolds in a near-operatic style reminiscent of many genres of Indian folk theatre". Rama Rao's performance as Bruhannala was praised: "Rao manages the transition well, swishing about in glittery drag and affecting exaggeratedly feminine mannerisms". The reviewer also found Kanta Rao's portrayal of Krishna "suitably charming, with an enigmatic style". M. L. Narasimham of The Hindu noted that the film provided one of the most fulfilling performances for Savitri as Sairandhri. On its 45th anniversary, Telugu newspaper Sakshi praised the performances of Rama Rao and Ranga Rao as Bruhannala and Keechaka respectively; the newspaper termed the former a "strange adventure" considering the actor's stardom.

== Legacy ==
Nartanasala's success inspired filmmakers to explore the theme of a protagonist with a dark past living with a different identity in a place alien to him. The film's success also earned recognition to Padmini Priyadarshini (who played Urvashi in the film) as a dancer in South Indian cinema. In May 2012, Radhika Rajamani of Rediff.com mentioned Nartanasala for the letter N in her list, "The A to Z of Telugu Cinema". In November 2012, The Times of India listed Nartanasala along with other unrelated films such as Missamma (1955), Mayabazar (1957), Gundamma Katha (1962), and Bommarillu (2006) in the list "Telugu classics to watch along with family this Deepavali". The commentator for The Times praised the songs, the overall treatment and Ranga Rao's portrayal of Kichaka. (Note: Diwali, also known as Deepavali or the festival of lights, is an Indian Hindu festival celebrated in the autumn season. Diwali is celebrated using Fireworks and lamps. The legends behind this festival are the slaying of Narakasura by Satyabhama, Rama's return to Ayodhya after exile, and an auspicious day to worship Lakshmi for wealth and prosperity.) For the April 2013 centennial of Indian cinema, News18 included Nartanasala in its list of "The 100 greatest Indian films of all time". In the Telugu film Bhale Manchi Roju (2015), the old theatre from where the villain (played by P. Sai Kumar) operates is named Nartanasala after this film.

== Cancelled remake ==
Rama Rao's son and actor Nandamuri Balakrishna announced Nartanasala's remake in 2004. Apart from directing the remake, Balakrishna played a dual role in the remake—those of Arjuna and Kichaka. Soundarya was signed to play Draupadi with Srihari, Sarath Babu, Uday Kiran and Asin cast in supporting roles. The remake's principal photography commenced on 1 March 2004. The remake was shelved later due to the death of Soundarya in an accident. In an interview with The Times of India in August 2014, Balakrishna said that he could not imagine anyone other than Soundarya for the character and after her death, he called off the film with no intention to revive it. The footage that was shot for the film was released as a 17 minute short film directly on the OTT platform Shreyas ET on 24 October 2020.

== Bibliography ==
- Chabria, Suresh (2005). "Mudaliar, R. Nataraja". In Abel, Richard (ed.). Encyclopaedia of Hindi Cinema. Taylor & Francis. ISBN 978-0-415-23440-5.
- Chowdhry, Prem (2000). Colonial India and the Making of Empire Cinema: Image, Ideology and Identity. Manchester University Press. ISBN 978-0-7190-5792-2.
- Jacobsen, Knut A. (11 August 2015). Routledge Handbook of Contemporary India. Routledge. ISBN 978-1-317-40358-6.
- Rajadhyaksha, Ashish; Willemen, Paul (1998) [1994]. Encyclopaedia of Indian Cinema. British Film Institute and Oxford University Press. ISBN 0-19-563579-5.
