= Mahabharat (1988 TV series) =

1988 TV series by B. R. Chopra based on Mahabharata

- Genre: Epic
- Created by: B. R. Chopra
- Based on: Mahabharata by Veda Vyasa
- Written by: Pandit Narendra Sharma; Rahi Masoom Raza
- Screenplay by: Rahi Masoom Raza
- Directed by: B. R. Chopra; Ravi Chopra
- Creative director: Yashwant Mahilwar
- Starring: See below
- Narrated by: Harish Bhimani
- Composer: Raj Kamal
- Country of origin: India
- Original language: Hindi
- No. of seasons: 1
- No. of episodes: 94

Production
- Executive producer: D.H. Vengurlekar
- Producer: B. R. Chopra
- Cinematography: Dharam Chopra
- Editors: Shailendra Doke; Birpal Singh
- Running time: 40-45 minutes
- Production company: B.R. Films

Original release
- Network: DD National
- Release: 2 October 1988 – 24 June 1990

Related
- Mahabharat Katha

Mahabharat is an Indian Hindi-language epic television series based on the ancient Sanskrit epic Mahabharata. The original airing consisted of a total of 94 episodes and were broadcast from 2 October 1988 to 24 June 1990 on Doordarshan. It was produced by B. R. Chopra and directed by his son, Ravi Chopra. The music was composed by Raj Kamal. The script was written by Pandit Narendra Sharma, based on the epic composed by Maharishi Veda Vyasa. The dialogues were penned by Rahi Masoom Raza. Costumes for the series were provided by Maganlal Dresswala. The serial claims to have used the Critical Edition of Bhandarkar Oriental Research Institute as its basic source with Vishnu Sitaram Sukthankar and Shripad Krishna Belwalkar as its primary editor.

Each episode is 40–46 minutes long and begins with a title song that consisted of lyrical content and two verses from the Bhagavad Gita. The title song was sung and the verses rendered by singer Mahendra Kapoor. The title song is followed by a narration by Indian voice-artist Harish Bhimani as a personification of Time, detailing the current circumstances and highlighting the spiritual significance of the content of the episodes.

Mahabharat Katha, another part of the serial was aired on 1997 which covers all the untold stories about Karna's marriage with Padmavati, Arjuna's marriage with Chitrāngadā and Ulupi, and stories about Ghatotkacha, Barbarika, Vrishaketu, Babruvahana, conspiracies of Viprachitti, Ashwamedha Yajna, Dushala's story and aftermath of the Kurukshetra War, which are not covered in the original series.

== Premise ==
The series covers the story of epic Mahabharata with Krishna, Pandavas, Kauravas being the main focus of the epic.

The show begins with Emperor Bharata giving more importance to 'Capacity' than to 'Birth'. It shows the birth of Bhishma and his oath, birth of Pandu, Dhritarashtra and Vidura and birth of Pandavas and Kauravas. The story then focuses on the childhood of Lord Krishna.

Elsewhere, Dronacharya teaches Pandavas and Kauravas warfare, and after completion asks them to defeat his enemy king Drupada as payment for services or Guru Dakshina. Pandavas do so and give half of Drupad's kingdom(Panchala) to Drona. Dhritarashtra makes Yudhishthira (the eldest son of Pandu) the crown prince of Hastinapur. Shakuni (the maternal uncle of the Kauravas) and Duryodhana the eldest of the Kauravas hatch a plan to burn Pandavas and Kunti alive, but they survive and go into hiding, letting the rumour spread that they died in the fire. Duryodhana is made crown prince of Hastinapur.

Meanwhile in Panchal, king Drupad performs a yajna from the sacred fire of which, his children Dhrishtadyumna and Draupadi are born. Arjuna the best fighter among the Pandavas wins the hand of Draupadi in her swayamvara. Later, Yudhishthira is made the king of Indraprastha and Pandavas conduct Rajsuya Yagna where Draupadi insults Duryodhana. Later Duryodhana has his revenge by first defeating Yudhisthira in a rigged game of dice, in which Yudhisthira stakes his kingdom, his brothers and Draupadi and loses all, Duryodhana tries to disrobe Draupadi in front of the whole court, but she is saved by lord Krishna, then the Pandavas along with Draupadi are sent to an exile of 12 years and 1 year of living in anonymity. After the period of exile is over Duryodhana argues that the Pandavas violated the condition of anonymity in their last year of exile, therefore they must spend another 12 years in exile followed by another year of exile in anonymity. This conflict begins to sow the seed for the Mahabharata War.

Arjuna and Subhadra's son Abhimanyu marries Uttara. Krishna tries to make peace between both parties. Indra in the disguise of a Brahmin took Karna's armor and earrings. Kunti's sorrow on the corpse of Karna reveals Karna's true identity of being the eldest Pandava.

Before Mahabharata War, Shri Krishna enlightens Arjuna about the "Bhagavad Gita" and shows his Virata Swaroopa to Arjuna. The latter shows the deaths of Bhishma, Drona, Karna, Abhimanyu, Shalya, Shakuni, Jayadrata, Ghatotkacha, 100 Kauravas, 5 sons of Draupadi and many other warriors in the war leading to the victory of Pandavas over Kauravas. Only 5 Pandavas, Satyaki, Yuyutsu, Krishna, Ashwatthama, Kritavarma and Kripacharya survive. Gandhari holds Krishna responsible for her sons' death and curses that his family will also get destroyed. The show ends with Yudhishthir's Rajyabhishek and Bhishma's death.

== Cast ==
=== Main ===
- Nitish Bharadwaj as Krishna, eighth avatar of Vishnu, Devaki-Vasudev's eighth son, foster son of Nand and Yashoda, Balrama and Subhadra's brother, Pandavas' and Karna's cousin.
  - Kewal Shah as adolescent Krishna
- Pankaj Dheer as Karna, son of Kunti and Surya Dev, Adhiratha-Radha's foster son, King of Anga, Pandavas' Eldest Brother.
  - Harendra Paintal as young Karna
- Mukesh Khanna as Bhishma, Shantanu-Ganga's eighth son, eighth Vasu, Satyavati's step-son, elder half-brother of Chitrangada and Vichitravirya, paternal uncle of Dhritrashtra, Pandu, and Vidur, paternal granduncle of the Kauravas and the Pandavas
  - Krish Malik as adolescent Bhishma
- Gajendra Chauhan as Yudhishthira, first Pandava, son of Kunti and Yama, second eldest son of Kuru Clan, King of Indraprastha and later Hastinapura, husband of Draupadi, father of Prativindhya, Kauravas' Elder Cousin
  - Sonu as young Yudhishthira
- Praveen Kumar as Bhima, second Pandava, son of Kunti and Vayu, Yuvraj (crown prince) of Indraprastha and later Hastinapura, husband of Draupadi and Hidimbi, father of Ghatotkacha, Sutasoma, Duryodhana's Younger Cousin
  - Mallik as young Bhima
- Firoz Khan as Arjuna, third Pandava, son of Kunti and Indra, husband of Draupadi, Ulupi, Chitrāngadā and Subhadra, brother-in-law of Balaram and Krishna, father of Abhimanyu, Babruvahana, Iravan and Shrutakarma, Duryodhan's Younger cousin
  - Ankur Javeri as young Arjuna
- Roopa Ganguly as Draupadi, wife of the Pandavas, also called Panchali and Yagyaseni, younger daughter of Drupada, Princess of Panchala, sister of Dhrishtadhyumna and Shikhandi, mother of Upapandavas
- Puneet Issar as Duryodhana, eldest son of Gandhari and Dhritarashtra, elder brother of 99 Kauravas, husband of Bhanumati, Yudhishthira's younger cousin, Elder Cousin of other 4 Pandavas, Lakshmanaa's Father, Crown prince of Hastinapura, Karna's best friend
  - Amit Shukla as young Duryodhana
- Sameer Chitre as Nakula, fourth Pandava, son of Madri and Ashwini Kumara, husband of Draupadi, father of Shatanika
- Sanjeev Chitre as Sahadeva, fifth Pandav, son of Madri and Ashwini Kumara, husband of Draupadi and father of Shrutasena
- Vinod Kapoor as Dushasana, second son of Gandhari and Dhritarashtra, Duryodhan's younger brother
  - Kaushal Shah as young Dushasana
- Gufi Paintal as Shakuni, Gandhari's brother, later King of Gandhara, maternal uncle of Duryodhana and his 99 brothers
- Girija Shankar as Dhritrashtra, Vichitravirya's son from Ambika (eldest), later king of Hastinapura, father of Kauravas
- Renuka Israni as Gandhari, wife of Dhritrashtra, Queen of Hastinapura, mother of Kauravas, princess of Gandhara, sister of Shakuni
- Nazneen as Kunti, Pandu's first wife, mother of Karna, Yudhisthira, Bhim and Arjuna, daughter of Shurasena, Vasudeva's sister, Yadava princess, foster daughter of Kunti-Bhoja
- Virendra Razdan as Vidura, the prime minister of Hastinapur, son of Ambika's head maid Parishrami, fathered by Vyasa, half-brother to the kings Dhritarashtra and Pandu of Hastinapura, uncle of Pandavas and Kauravas
- Surendra Pal as Drona, Kauravas and Pandavas' guru, Ashwatthama's father
- Dharmesh Tiwari as Kripa, family teacher, brother of Kripi, Ashwatthama's maternal uncle
- Pradeep Rawat as Ashwatthama, son of Dronacharya
  - Ayush Shah as young Ashwatthama

=== Recurring ===
- Harish Bhimani as Time (Samaya), Narrator
- Sagar Salunke as Balarama, Krishna's elder brother
  - Chetan Hansraj as adolescent Balarama
- Aloka Mukherjee as Subhadra, Arjuna's fourth wife, Abhimanyu's mother, Vasudev's and Rohini's daughter, Krishna-Balaram's younger sister, Yadava princess
- Raj Babbar as Bharata, paternal ancestor of the Kauravas and Pandavas, son of King Dushyanta and Shakuntala
- Rishabh Shukla as Shantanu, descendant of King Bharata, husband of Ganga and Satyavati, father of Bhishma, Chitrangada and Vichitravirya, paternal grandfather of Dhritarashtra and Pandu, paternal great-grandfather of the Kauravas and the Pandavas
- Kiran Juneja as Ganga, Shantanu's first wife, Bhishma's mother, the holy river of Hindus
- Debashree Roy as Satyavati, King Shantanu's second wife; Vyasa, Chitrangada, and Vichitravirya's mother, Bhishma's step-mother, paternal grandmother of Dhritarashtra, Pandu, and Vidur, paternal great-grandmother of the Kauravas and the Pandavas
- Rajesh Vivek as Vyasa, son of Parashara and Satyavati, father of Dhritarashtra, Pandu and Vidura, partial incarnation of Vishnu, author of Mahabharata
- Sudesh Berry as Vichitravirya, Shantanu-Satyavati's second son after Chitrangada, Bhisma's step brother, husband of Ambika and Ambalika, father of Dhritarashtra and Pandu, paternal grandfather of the Kauravas and the Pandavas
- Jahnavi as Amba (Shikhandini), the first princess of Kashi, Shikhandi (reincarnated by Yaksha)
- Meena Chakrabarty as Ambika, second princess of Kashi, Vichitravirya's first queen, mother of Dhritarashtra, paternal grandmother of the Kauravas
- Menaka Babbar as Ambalika, third princess of Kashi, Vichitravirya's second queen, mother of Pandu, paternal grandmother of the Pandavas
- Paintal as Sudama / Shikhandi
- Tarakesh Chauhan as Pandu, Vichitravirya's son from Ambalika (the youngest wife), King of Hastinapur, husband of Kunti and Madri, father of Pandavas
- Roma Manek as Madri, Pandu's second wife, Madra princess, mother of Nakula and Sahadeva
- Asha Singh as Kripi, sister of Kripacharya, wife of Dronacharya and mother of Ashwathama
- Kamlesh Maan as Devi Sulabha, Vidura's wife
- Lalit Mohan Tiwari as Sanjaya, Dhritarashtra's advisor and also his charioteer
- Kapil Kumar as Shalya, Madri's elder brother, King of Madra
- Shahla Khan as Hidimbi, Hidimb's sister, Bheem's wife, Kunti's daughter-in-law and Ghatotkacha's mother
- Razak Khan as Ghatotkacha, son of Bhima and Hidimbi
- Mayur Verma (Master Mayur) as Abhimanyu, son of Arjun and Subhadra, husband of Uttara, father of Parikshit
- Varsha Usgaonkar as Uttara, Abhimanyu's wife, Matsya princess, mother of Parikshit
- Dinesh Anand as Vikarna, son of Gandhari and Dhritarashtra, Duyodhan's younger brother
- Paramjeet Chima as Dashraj, Satyavati's father
- Om Katare as Adhiratha, charioteer, Karna's foster father
- Saroj Sharma as Radha, Adhiratha's wife, Karna's foster mother
- Ramlal Gupta as Ugrasena, King of Mathura, Surasena, father of Kansa and Devaki
- Goga Kapoor as Kansa, son of Ugrasena, elder brother of Devaki, maternal uncle of Krishna and Balarama
- Vishnu Sharma as Vasudev, son of Shurasena, brother of Kunti, prince of Vrishni tribe, father of Balarama, Krishna, and Subhadra, maternal uncle of the Pandavas
- Kshama Raj as Rohini, Vasudeva's elder wife, mother of Balarama
- Sheela Sharma as Devaki, Vasudeva's younger wife, younger sister of Kansa, daughter of Ugrasena, mother of Krishna and Subhadra
- Rasik Dave as Nanda, chief of Gokul, foster father of Krishna
- Manju Vyas as Yashoda, Nand's wife, foster mother of Krishna
- Channa Ruparel as Rukmini, Krishna's chief wife
- Parijat as Maharani Radha, Krishna's consort
- Sumeet Raghavan as adolescent Sudama
- Ajay Sinha as Akroor, Chief of the Vrishni
- Bashir Khan as Satyaki
- Ashok Banthia as Kritavarma
- Pradeep Sharma as Panchalaraj Drupada, Draupadi's father, King of Panchala and Rishi Durvasa
- Arun Bakshi as Dhrishtadyumna, Draupadi's elder brother, Prince of Panchala
- Kanwarjit Paintal as Shikhandi, Drupad's elder son and also as adult Sudama
- Ashok Sharma as Virata, King of Matsya
- Chandni Sharma as Sudeshna, Queen of Matsya
- Sameer Rajda as Uttar, crown prince of Matsya
- Sharat Saxena as Kichaka, Army General of Matsya
- Deep Dhillon as Jayadratha, Dushala's husband, Kauravas' brother-in-law, King of Sindhu
- Vikrant Mathur as Subala, Shakuni's and Gandhari's father, King of Gandhara
- Shavinder Mahal as Parashurama and Shiva
- Satish Kaul as Indra
- Gopi Krishna as Chitrasena
- Rakesh Bidua as Kashya, King of Kashi
- Rana Jung Bahadur as Jarasandha, King of Magadha, father-in-law of Kamsa
- Karunakar Pathak as Shishupala, King of Chedi, a maternal cousin of Krishna and Balarama
- Pawan Shukla as Shalva Kumar, Prince of Salwa, Princess Amba's lover
- Prem Sagar as Kanva
- Pankaj Berry as Kindama, a sage who cursed Pandu
- Mini Singh as Kindama's wife
- Mulraj Rajda as King Shantanu's Royal Guru and Gandharva Mukhiya

=== Episodic appearance ===
- Ashalata Wabgaonkar as Shakuntala, Bharata's mother, King Dushyanta's wife
- Vikas Prasad as Ekalavya
- Randhir Singh as Hidimb and Putana
- Sabrina as Putana (cameo)
- Dara Singh as Hanuman (cameo)
- Raj Kishore as Rajpurohit of Panchal Kingdom (cameo)
- Dinesh Kaushik as Rukmi
- Bashir Khan (not the one who played Satyaki) as Parashar, father of Vyasa
- Vinod Raut as Purochana, architect of Laksagriha in Varnavata

== Episodes ==
Episode No.	Summary	Air date
1	Introduction to the Kuru Kingdom and its capital, Hastinapur. The story of Emperor Bharata and his descendant King Shantanu's marriage with the river goddess Ganga.	2 October 1988
2	Ganga kills her seven cursed sons but Shantanu stops her from killing the eighth, Bhishma. Bhishma is then taken away and educated under various sages before returning as a learned and skilled warrior.	9 October 1988
3	Bhishma is proclaimed crown prince of the Kuru Kingdom. However, he gives up his throne and swears an oath of celibacy to facilitate a marriage between Shantanu and a fisherwoman he fell in love with.	16 October 1988
4	Amazed at his incredible vow, Shantanu grants his son the boon that he will be able to choose the time and place of his death. Bhishma also vows to always protect the throne of Hastinapur. Later, Shantanu and the fisherwoman, Satyavati, get married and give birth to two sons. The king passes away afterward.	23 October 1988
5	The younger son, Vichitravirya, ascends the throne. Bhishma abducts three princesses of a neighboring kingdom from their swayamvara for the new king. One of the princesses, Amba, is let go, as her heart was promised to another. However she is rejected by her lover and, as a result, vows revenge on Bhishma.	30 October 1988
6	Vichitravirya dies leaving no heir. Satyavati decides to have her pre-marital son, Vyasa, sire heirs for the kingdom by union with Vichitravirya's two queens; a practice called niyoga. This results in the birth of Dhritarashtra, Pandu, and Vidura. Pandu is proclaimed king on account of Dhritarashtra's blindness and Vidura assumes the role of Prime Minister.	6 November 1988
7	Dhritarashtra marries Gandhari, who blindfolds herself out of devotion to her blind husband. Her brother, Shakuni, considers this an insult and swears revenge. Pandu marries Kunti of the Yaduvamsha. Unbeknownst to anyone, she had sired a child with the sun god Surya in her youth using a mantra. In fear of societal backlash, she placed it on a basket and floated it down a river.	13 November 1988
8	Pandu marries a second wife, Madri. He decides to go on a forest retreat with his wives for some time. He leaves Dhritarashtra in charge as steward.	20 November 1988
9	Pandu accidentally kills sage Kindama who, with his last breath, curses Pandu to die if he ever attempts to make love. To do penance, Pandu gives up the throne and retreats to the forest with his wives indefinitely, making Dhritarashtra the new king. Kunti uses her mantra to sire three children for Pandu from three gods - Yudhishthira, Bhima, Arjuna. Madri does the same and sires Nakula and Sahadeva. These children are dubbed the Pandavas. Meanwhile, Gandhari gives birth to a 100 sons, the Kauravas, the eldest of whom is Duryodhana.	27 November 1988
10	Elsewhere in Mathura, Kamsa usurps his father's throne. For this occasion, he marries his cousin Devaki with his good friend Vasudeva. However, a sage warns him that Devaki's eighth son will be his doom.	4 December 1988
11	Kamsa imprisons the couple and kills their first six sons. The seventh son's embryo is transferred to one of Vasudeva's other wives by miraculous means. With the help of the gods, Vasudeva takes the eighth son and hands him over to his friend, Nanda.	11 December 1988
12	Nanda and his wife Yashoda adopt and raise the eighth son, whom they name Krishna. They also adopt the seventh son, Balarama. Kamsa sends the rakshasi Putana to kill the infant Krishna, but she is vanquished by him.	18 December 1988
13	An adolescent Krishna makes a name for himself in his village as a mischievous and playful butter thief and flute player. In one instance, Yashoda witnesses the Earth spinning inside Krishna's mouth.	25 December 1988
14	Krishna subdues Kaliya, a mythical serpentine creature known as a naga, who was poisoning the local Yamuna river.	1 January 1989
15	Introduction to Radha, a romantic interest of Krishna. Krishna persuades the villagers to not give Kamsa his tax. As a retort, Kamsa sends the demons Dhenuka and Pralamba to lay waste to the village. However they are vanquished by Krishna and Balarama.	8 January 1989
16	Krishna persuades the villagers to redirect their worship from the god Indra to the world that sustains them. Out of anger, Indra sends a great storm to the village but Krishna shields everyone by raising a hill above their heads with his finger.	15 January 1989
17	Krishna and Balarama are invited to Mathura by Kamsa. There, many attempts are made on their lives but the brothers overcome all obstacles and vanquish Kamsa once and for all.	22 January 1989
18	Pandu dies to his curse due to not being able to resist Madri. Out of shame and guilt, Madri burns herself with Pandu on his funeral pyre. Vasudeva, who is Kunti's brother, along with Devaki, arrive and offer their condolences. Kunti and her sons return to Hastinapur.	29 January 1989
19	Satyavati, Ambika and Ambalika (mothers of Dhritarashtra and Pandu) retreat to the forest with Vyasa. An enmity brews between the Pandavas and the Kauravas.	5 February 1989
20	Duryodhana poisons Bhima and throws him into the Ganges. Bhima sinks down into the land of the nagas and their venom neutralizes the poison in his blood. The king of the nagas, Vasuki, offers him a drink that gains him the strength of 1000 elephants. Meanwhile, the royal charioteer retires from his position to focus on his adopted son, Karna, who happens to be Kunti's first child.	12 February 1989
21	Bhishma hires the famed arms teacher, Drona, to train the Kauravas and the Pandavas. Arjuna gains his favor due to his skill in archery. Elsewhere, Krishna studies under the sage Sandipani, along with Balarama, and his friend Sudama.	19 February 1989
22	Karna aspires to be the greatest archer and requests to study under Drona. However, he is rejected due to his low status as a charioteer's son. Meanwhile, it is revealed that Drona is haunted by something from his past and his coming to Hastinapur might have ulterior motives.	26 February 1989
23	Drona catches a tribal boy, Ekalavya, spying on his lessons. As a reprimand and gurudakshina he demands Ekalavya's thumb. Meanwhile, sage Parashurama takes Karna under his wing and trains him. Elsewhere, Krishna finishes his studies and, as gurudakshina, brings back Sandipani's son from the land of the dead.	5 March 1989
24	A great arena is erected so the grown up Pandavas and Kauravas can show off the skills they have learned from Drona. As Arjuna demonstrates his mastery over the bow and is proclaimed the greatest archer alive, Karna enters the stage and challenges him to a duel. His low status does not allow him this right but Duryodhana, in a bid to gain Karna's friendship, gifts him the Anga Kingdom. However, before anything can progress, the sun sets.	12 March 1989
25	It is revealed that the King of Panchala, Drupada, had once insulted Drona, from which he still seethes in anger. For his gurudakshina, Drona asks his students to conquer Panchala and bring Drupada as a captive.	19 March 1989
26	Kamsa's father-in-law, Jarasandha, persistently attacks Mathura. Krishna decides it best to abandon Mathura and relocate to a new city, Dwaraka, which he builds using the help of the divine architect, Vishvakarma. Meanwhile, Hastinapur is split on whom to announce as their crown prince. While Duryodhana is the eldest son of the current king, Dhritarashtra, Pandu's eldest son Yudhishthira enjoys the support of the people.	26 March 1989
27	Yudhishthira and Duryodhana are tested on their ethics, which the former passes, leading to him being proclaimed the crown prince. Elsewhere, Jarasandha, in a bid to strengthen his political influence, proposes to the King of Vidarbha to have her daughter Rukmini be married to Jarasandha's friend, Shishupala of Chedi.	2 April 1989
28	Rukmini, who does not agree with the marriage, appeals to her true love, Krishna, for help. While Balarama engages the Vidarbha military and Shishupala, Krishna whisks Rukmini away on his chariot. Her brother, Rukmi, attempts to stop them but is defeated. Meanwhile, Shakuni and Duryodhana devise a plan to build a resort for the Pandavas and burn it down with them in it.	9 April 1989
29	Duryodhana appeals to Dhritarashtra to send the Pandavas away on a vacation to the village of Varnavat, where a festival is taking place. The King is unaware of the plan to build the resort and deliberates with Vidura and Bhishma on whether to go ahead with the plan. Meanwhile, Karna is opposed to the scheme as he deems it cowardly and prefers facing the Pandavas in open battle.	16 April 1989
30	The decision is made that all the Pandavas and Kunti will go to Varnavat. Purochana, royal architect and confidant of Shakuni, builds a resort for them out of flammable materials; a lakshagriha. Before the brothers depart, Vidura cryptically warns them of the scheme. Once they arrive, they realize the nature of the house and Purochana's deception. Later, Vidura sends them a tunnel digger to create an escape route.	23 April 1989
31	Purochana and his helpers celebrate in the lakshagriha before the execution of the plan. However, at that moment, the Pandavas and Kunti start the fire themselves and escape through the completed tunnel. Purochana and his helpers perish in the flames and their corpses are mistaken to be that of the Pandavas and Kunti.	30 April 1989
32	The Pandavas enter a life of exile. In the deep forest, the rakshasa Hidimb orders his sister, Hidimbi, to go capture the Pandavas as food. But once she reaches them she is smitten by Bhima and takes the form of a beautiful woman to seduce him. Hidimb had followed her and tries to kill them all but Bhima, with help from Hidimbi, vanquishes him. Afterward, Bhima agrees to marry Hidimbi until they have a child.	7 May 1989
33	The Pandavas and Kunti settle down with a Brahmin family in the village of Ekachakra. Bhima kills a rakshasa named Bakasura, who was tormenting the village. However, fearing their identities may be revealed, the group leaves the village.	14 May 1989
34	Drupada obtains a son and daughter, Draupadi and Dhrishtadyumna, through a fire ritual in a bid to enact revenge against Drona. Draupadi's swayamvara is announced and most characters from the show make their way there including the Pandavas in disguise, the Kauravas and Krishna. At the ceremony an archery challenge is revealed, and whoever passes it is to become Draupadi's husband. All kings and princes present fail before Arjuna steps up to the plate.	21 May 1989
35	Arjuna wins the challenge. The brothers bring home Draupadi but jokingly say, as they enter their hut, that they have bought alms. Hearing this, Kunti unknowingly tells them to split it evenly among themselves. Yudhishthira argues that a mother's words are always to be obeyed and there must be a reason for this incident. At that moment, Krishna arrives, and reveals that Draupadi, in her past life, asked for a husband with five incredible qualities which is impossible for a single man to possess. In the end, Draupadi agrees to marry all five brothers.	28 May 1989
36	Hastinapur is informed that the Pandavas are still alive. Dhritarashtra, realizing that the Pandavas have now found powerful allies in Panchala and Dwaraka, sends Vidura to invite them home.	4 June 1989
37	The Pandavas return to Hastinapur and the conflict of who will be the crown prince resurfaces. Bhishma suggests the Kingdom be partitioned in two and the halves be given to Duryodhana and Yudhishthira each as a compromise.	11 June 1989
38	Duryodhana receives Hastinapur while Yudhishthira is given the barren land of the Khandava Forest. Although the brothers are reluctant to accept, Krishna tells them that this land is their opportunity to prove themselves. Later, Bhishma tells Arjuna that if the two halves of the Kuru Kingdom go to war he will be tied to the throne of Hastinapur due to his oath. Meanwhile, Duryodhana attempts to befriend Balarama to gain influence within Dwaraka.	18 June 1989
39	Vyasa himself officiates the coronation of Yudhishthira. With help from Krishna, Balarama, and the storm god Indra, the Pandavas transform Khandava into a fertile landscape with a beautiful palace. The region is renamed Indraprastha.	25 June 1989
40	Duryodhana uses his newfound friendship with Balarama to ask for his sister, Subhadra's, hand in marriage. However, Subhadhra is smitten by Arjuna. Krishna suggests that they elope. After they do, Balarama is greatly angered and gathers all the Yadus to attack Arjuna. But Krishna diffuses the situation by reminding them that Subhadhra herself chose her husband and wouldn't have agreed to marry Duryodhana anyway.	2 July 1989
41	Arjuna and Subhadra get married. Sage Narada suggests that Yudhishthira complete his rajasuya ceremony. However, Krishna says that in order to so, he must defeat the tyrant king Jarasandha, who plans to sacrifice a 100 kings in order to gain a powerful boon from the god Shiva. Krishna, Arjuna, and Bhima smuggle themselves into Jarsandha's court using Brahmin disguises. They then challenge him to a brawl and ask him to pick one of them as an opponent. Bhima is chosen.	9 July 1989
42	Bhima kills Jarasandha, and the kings in his captivity are freed. The preparations for the rajasuya ceremony begin. Kings from all over India are invited and among them is Shishupala of Chedi. It is revealed that he was born with a third eye. His mother, wondering if this is a test, asks God how he will die. God reveals that on whose lap the child's third eye will disappear is the one who will kill him. This turns out to be Krishna. Shishupala's mother begs Krishna to forgive a 100 offenses of her child before killing him and Krishna agrees.	16 July 1989
43	Yudhishthira's rajasuya is held. During the ceremony, Yudhishthira deems that Krishna should receive respects before anyone else. Shishupala protests and starts obscenely insulting everyone present. Krishna counts down his transgressions until it passes 100 after which he uses the sudarshana chakra to kill him. The rajasuya is finished and Vyasa himself comes and offers his blessings.	23 July 1989
44	As the ceremony comes to an end, all the guests slowly start to take their leave. Duryodhana inspects the great hall built by the danava, Maya, at Indraprastha. He is tricked by its illusions and mistakenly falls into a pool of water. Draupadi witnesses this and insults him. Duryodhana swears revenge and, along with Shakuni, conspires to invite the Pandavas to a game of dice and cheat them out of their possessions.	30 July 1989
45	Dhritarashtra, compelled by Duryodhana, sends Vidura to invite the Pandavas to a game of dice. The brothers arrive and preparations begin.	6 August 1989
46	The game begins. Duryodhana insists that Shakuni play on his behalf. One after another Yudhishthira bets his possessions but Shakuni, with loaded die, wins them all, including his brothers, kingdom and wife. Vidura is the only one to stand up and demand the king to stop the entire arrangement but Dhritarashtra reminds him that no one compelled Yudhishthira to make the bets.	13 August 1989
47	Duryodhana orders his younger brother Dushasana to drag Draupadi out of her quarters, given that she belongs to him now. Draupadi demands an answer for this insult from the elders at the court but none of them are able to go against the king's orders. The King himself has his hands tied by the love for his son. Duryodhana then orders Dushasana to disrobe Draupadi. But an ethereal Krishna appears and makes it so she never runs out of fabric. Dushasana pulls and pulls until finally giving up, saving Draupadi her shame. Bhima vows to kill Duryodhana and Dushasana, while Arjuna vows to kill Karna. As Draupadi prepares to curse all of the Kauravas, Gandhari appears.	20 August 1989
48	Gandhari condemns everyone present, but begs Draupadi to not inflict a curse. Dhritarashtra, out of shame, returns the losses incurred by the Pandavas.	27 August 1989
49	Duryodhana feels he has been cheated out of his winnings by his father. He compels Dhritarashtra to host a second game of dice. This time, the loser has to go into 12 years of exile and 1 year of ajnatavasa. Meanwhile, Draupadi keeps her hair unbraided so the Pandavas are always reminded of her insult. The Pandavas agree to the second game but lose it too.	3 September 1989
50	The Pandavas begin their exile and Kunti leaves the palace to stay with Vidura. The four younger Pandavas, and Dhrishtadyumna, are all ready and eager to attack the Kuru Kingdom. But Yudhishthira convinces them to complete the terms of the exile.	10 September 1989
51	Duryodhana and his friends go on a camping trip near where the Pandavas are staying. There, he tries to harass a gandharva woman but is captured by them. Karna abandons his friend to evade capture. The Pandavas hear of this and are convinced by Yudhishthira to go and rescue him. Duryodhana and Karna both feel deeply humiliated.	17 September 1989
52	Krishna visits the Pandavas and implores Arjuna to acquire divine weapons. Arjuna starts meditating and his divine father, Indra, appears before him. He tells him to ask Lord Shiva for the pashupatastra. Duryodhana sends a demon, Mukasura, to interrupt Arjuna. Arjuna vanquishes him, at which point Shiva appears and gives him the pashupatastra. This allows Arjuna to go to svarga and get divine weapons from Indra. Elsewhere, Karna conquers several kingdoms on behalf of Hastinapur in order to rectify his cowardice during Duryodhana's capture.	24 September 1989
53	Sage Durvasa and other Brahmins arrive at the exiled Pandavas’ dwelling. The hosts are worried as they don’t have enough food for their guests. But Krishna uses his divine power to fill the Brahmins’ stomachs. Meanwhile, Bhima meets Ghatotkacha, the son he had with Hidimbi, as well as Hanuman, son of Vayu (Bhima’s divine father). In svarga, Indra recommends that Arjuna learn dance and music skills from the gandharva, Chitrasena.	1 October 1989
54	Arjuna rejects the advances of the apsara, Urvashi, who curses him to live one year of his life as a eunuch. Meanwhile, King of Sindh, Jayadratha, abducts Draupadi but is defeated and humiliated by the Pandavas. Elsewhere in Dwaraka, Subhadra raises Arjuna's son, Abhimanyu.	8 October 1989
55	The Pandava brothers find a lake protected by a tree spirit, a yaksha. The yaksha warns not to drink the water before answering his riddles. Four of the brothers ignore his warning and die. Yudhishthira is the only one to stop and answer his riddles first. The yaksha then reveals himself to be the God of Truth, Dharma, and revives the brothers. Elsewhere, Jayadratha performs penance to seek a boon from Lord Shiva and enact revenge on the Pandavas.	15 October 1989
56	The Pandavas' begin their year of ajnatavasa in the Matsya Kingdom. Yudhishthira takes up a spot in the King, Virata's, court as a dice player. Bhima becomes a cook, and Arjuna becomes a eunuch dance teacher for the Princess Uttara. Nakula becomes a stable boy and Sahadeva a cowherd. Draupadi becomes a maid for the Queen Sudeshna.	22 October 1989
57	It is revealed that Parashurama only agreed to train Karna because Karna was pretending to be a Brahmin. Upon learning the truth, Parashurama curses Karna to lose all his learned skills the moment when he is at the greatest need of them. Meanwhile, King Virata's brother-in-law, Kichaka, is smitten by Draupadi's beauty.	29 October 1989
58	Kichaka publicly harasses Draupadi but the Pandavas are forced to stay silent. While Yudhishthira doesn't want to risk their identities, Draupadi personally requests Bhima to avenge her shame. Bhima kills Kichaka and the news reaches Hastinapur, where Duryodhana surmises that the Pandavas must be hiding out in Matsya.	5 November 1989
59	Duryodhana convinces his father to back the Trigarta Kingdom in their attack against Matsya. Trigarta attacks first but is utterly defeated due to help from the disguised Pandavas. Yudhishthira recommends King Virata spare the enemy king, Susharma's, life. The Kurus attack next and this time, Prince Uttara, with Arjuna as his charioteer, go in advance to meet the army. Uttara gets scared and tries to flee but Arjuna reprimands him and reveals his identity. At this point, their ajnatavasa has ended, and Arjuna blows his special conch to let the Kurus know he's here.	12 November 1989
60	Arjuna defeats the entire Kuru army and, using his magical arrows, puts them to sleep. He then retrieves the scarves of the sleeping warriors as gifts for princess Uttara. Eventually, the Pandavas reveal their identities, and as a token of gratitude for serving the kingdom, Arjuna accepts princess Uttara as a bride for his son Abhimanyu.	19 November 1989
61	The Pandavas' exile finally ends and Abhimanyu and Uttara's marriage is held. Although most warriors on the Pandavas' side ache for war, Krishna says to never invite violence and to send a messenger to Hastinapur and ask for peace. Meanwhile in Hastinapur, the elders and advisors implore the King to give back Indraprastha to the Pandavas. However, Duryodhana proclaims that they had broken the conditions of their exile as, by his calculations, the ajnatavasa had not ended when Arjuna blew his conch.	26 November 1989
62	The Pandavas' messenger is returned and Dhritarashtra declines giving Indraprastha back. Hastinapur sends its own messenger, Sanjaya, the royal charioteer, to convey this message.	3 December 1989
63	The Pandavas send Sanjaya back with the threat of war. Duryodhana and Arjuna visit Dwaraka to ask for Krishna's help in the war, as they are all cousins. Arjuna chooses to have Krishna as his charioteer while Duryodhana chooses the entire Yaduvamshi army. Krishna also vows to not use a weapon during the war.	10 December 1989
64	Krishna goes to Hastinapur as a last resort to prevent war. Duryodhana invites him to eat with him but Krishna refuses and decides to eat at Vidura's house instead.	17 December 1989
65	Krishna asks for only five villages of the kingdom in return for peace. Even this is rejected by Duryodhana, who attempts to arrest him. But Krishna assumes his vishvarupa form and subdues everyone. Elsewhere, Indra worries for his son because Arjuna's weapon, Gandiva, will not penetrate Karna's divine armor. He takes Karna's armor but in return gives him a powerful weapon.	24 December 1989
66	Krishna reveals to Karna his true identity as Kunti's eldest son. Karna is heartbroken but proclaims that he is indebted to Duryodhana and has done too much in ignorance to turn back now. Bhishma agrees to be Commander of the Kauravas. However, he says that Karna cannot fight under him and that he will not kill any of the Pandava brothers.	31 December 1989
67	Vidura resigns as prime minister. Kunti decides to meet with Karna and talk to him. Karna initially gets very emotional and unleashes years of rage and frustration onto her. But he then apologizes and tells her that his duel to the death with Arjuna cannot be avoided. Krishna returns to the Pandavas and informs them of the Kauravas' answer.	7 January 1990
68	Dhrishtadyumna is proclaimed Commander of the Pandavas. Vyasa gives Sanjaya divine vision so he can see every moment of the war and narrate the events to Dhritarashtra.	14 January 1990
69	The Pandavas' uncle and Madri's brother, Shalya, makes his way toward the battlefield. However, before he can be received by Yudhishthira, he is hosted by Kaurava soldiers pretending to be Pandavas. When Duryodhana tells him the truth, Shalya insists that for being good hosts they may ask for a boon. Duryodhana asks Shalya to fight on the Kauravas' side which Shalya reluctantly agrees to do.	21 January 1990
70	King Drupada's eldest son, Shikhandi, is revealed to be a reborn Amba, here to enact vengeance on Bhishma. He is presented as gender ambiguous, although referred to by everyone as a he.	28 January 1990
71	The night before the war is set to begin, Arjuna asks for blessings from the goddess of war, Durga. The Pandavas and Kauravas meet to discuss rules. Bhishma decides the following rules: only active armed combatants are to be attacked, fighting will begin and end with sunrise and sunset, and multiple warriors shall not surround and attack a single one.	4 February 1990
72	War begins and Arjuna Drops His weapons out of grief, Krishna teaches him the Bhagavad Gita	11 February 1990
73	Bhagavad Gita teaching continues	18 February 1990
74	Bhagavad Gita teaching continues and Krishna shows his Vishvarupa form, Arjuna is ready to fight again	25 February 1990
75	Yudhishthira gets his blessings from the elders on the Kaurava side. The battle finally begins. Abhimanyu meets Bhishma and tries to block him as neither can kill each other.	4 March 1990
76	Prince Uttar dies to Shalya and the first day of war ends. The second day of war begins. Dhrishtadyumna is injured by Drona while Arjuna and Bhishma have a short exchange of arrows.	11 March 1990
77	Bhishma injures Krishna. Arjuna, in return, kills Bhishma's charioteer. The second day ends. On the third day, Krishna brings out the sudarshana chakra to kill Bhishma but is convinced by Arjuna to step down. Arjuna then almost defeats Bhishma himself but the sun sets. The fourth day begins, where Bhima kills 10 Kaurava brothers.	18 March 1990
78	9 days of war pass, in which time 16 more Kaurava brothers die. At night, Krishna tells Yudhishthira to go to Bhishma and return his blessings. This is due to the fact that as Bhishma is invincible, his blessing to the Pandavas for their victory is meaningless. Bhishma refuses but reveals that if a woman was to stand in front of him, he would not use his bow. Krishna then realizes that the best person for this job is Shikhandi.	25 March 1990
79	On the tenth day of war, Shikhandi stands before Bhishma whereupon Bhishma lays down his weapons. Arjuna uses this opportunity to fire an array of arrows at Bhishma, nailing him to the ground. Thus, Bhishma is officially out of the war, although he chooses not to die yet. Drona is appointed the new Kaurava Commander. Bhishma reveals to Karna that he knew about his true parentage and obstructed him from the war so he wouldn't die to Arjuna.	1 April 1990
80	Duryodhana asks Drona to capture Yudhishthira alive, giving him the false promise that Yudhishthira's life will be spared. The 11th day begins. As Drona's aim isn't to kill, he doesn't hold back. However, the Pandavas surround Yudhishthira and protect him. Meanwhile, Sahadeva and Shakuni have a duel but the sun sets before a conclusion. Elsewhere, Bhishma remains nailed to the battlefield, day and night, enduring all the pain.	8 April 1990
81	Duryodhana tasks Susharma, who is fighting for the Kauravas, to distract Arjuna so Drona can attack Yudhishthira. The 12th day begins and Susharma successfully moves Arjuna away from Yudhishthira. Drona easily disarms the remaining Pandavas but the sun sets. That night, Drona plans the chakravyuha formation.	15 April 1990
82	Abhimanyu is the only one aside from Arjuna who knows how to break into the chakravyuha. However he does not know how to break out. The Pandavas assure him that they will accompany him the whole way. As Arjuna is again distracted by Susharma, Abhimanyu breaks into the chakravyuha. However, his uncles are prevented from entering by Jayadratha, who holds them off all on his own. Inside the formation, Abhimanyu is ambushed and killed by the Kauravas.	22 April 1990
83	Arjuna finally kills Susharma and the 13th day ends. At night, he performs the last rites for his son. Krishna reveals that Jayadratha's success was a result of a boon from Shiva. Arjuna proclaims that if he does not kill Jayadratha before the next sunset, he will commit suicide. It is also revealed that Jayadratha received a boon from his father which makes it so that whoever is responsible for Jayadratha's head falling to the ground will have their own head explode.	29 April 1990
84	On the 14th day of war, Jayadratha is placed at the very back of the Kaurava army. Arjuna storms across the battlefield, hell bent on his goal, defeating every major warrior on the way. Krishna tells him of Jayadratha's second boon and to make sure that his head does not touch the ground.	6 May 1990
85	Krishna covers the Sun with his Sudarshana Chakra, Arjuna kills Jayadratha	13 May 1990
86	Ghatotkacha, son of Bhima, enters the battle. The scales are tipped in the Pandavas' favor but Karna uses his celestial weapon, gifted by Indra, to kill the rakshasa. By this point, 98 Kaurava brothers have fallen, and only Duryodhana and Dushasana remain.	20 May 1990
87	Drona kills the kings Virata and Drupada. Krishna decides to employ trickery and have Bhima kill an elephant named Ashwatthama, the same name as Drona's son. Bhima announces this and Drona drops his weapons in grief. Drishtadyumna uses this opportunity to kill Drona. The 15th day ends.	27 May 1990
88	Karna enters the battlefield, on the 16th day, as the commander of the Kauravas. Bhima fights and defeats Dushasana, ripping his hand off and his chest open. He presents Dushasana's blood to Draupadi. Karna and Arjuna have a face off but the sun sets.	3 June 1990
89	Karna killed by Arjuna	10 June 1990
90	Shakuni and Shalya die, Duryodhana and the Pandavas learn about Karna's truth, Yudhishthira's curse on all womankind, Gandhari curses Krishna and his Yadava dynasty, Duryodhana's body gets protection shield by Gandhari's magic	17 June 1990
91	Balarama arrives, Bhima and Duryodhana's duel, Duryodhana is fatally wounded, Balarama scolds Bhima but Krishna calms him down	24 June 1990
92	Duryodhana, found by the remaining Kaurava leaders, orders Ashwathhama to assassinate the Pandavas in the cover of the night. He dies shortly afterward, ending the war. Ashwatthama successfully infiltrates the Pandava camp but, in the darkness, mistakenly kills Draupadi's five children. Upon learning the truth, Ashwathhama tries to kill the Pandavas with the brahmastra but Vyasa forbids him from doing so. Then, he redirects the weapon to Uttara's womb, attempting to kill her unborn child. For all his crimes, Krishna curses Ashwathhama to live forever and in pain. Uttara's child is saved by Krishna and born as Parikshit.	1 July 1990
93	The Pandavas return to Hastinapur.	8 July 1990
94	Dhritarashtra, Vidura, Kunti and Gandhari quit the kingdom and exile themselves to the forest. Yudhisthira becomes King of Hastinapur, and Bhishma, seeing the kingdom in good hands at last, takes his last breath.	15 July 1990

== Production ==
=== Development ===
According to production team member Kishore Malhotra, the total cost of producing the series was ₹9 crore (equivalent to ₹112 crore or US$12 million in 2026). According to Director Ravichopra each episode was made up of ₹6.5 lakh to ₹7 lakh. Casting for the series began in 1986 and shooting started off in mid-1988. Show was shot mostly at Mumbai's Film City, and the grand battle of Kurukshetra was shot in Rajasthan, with thousands of extras to fill the screen.

The series was initially submitted to the channel for 104 episodes which was later shortened to 94 episodes.

=== Casting ===
15,000 people applied to play different roles in the Mahabharat TV series. The casting team led by Gufi Paintal shortlisted them and called around 1,500 for video screen tests Almost all actors in the series were newcomers, barring Raj Babbar who played King Bharat, Debashree Roy who played Satyavati. Nitish Bharadwaj was chosen by B.R. Chopra, Ravi Chopra, Pandit Narendra Sharma and Rahi Masoom Raza, to play the central role of Krishna, at the age of 23. Initially, he was chosen for playing Vidura. But Virendra Razdan was cast for it as B.R.Chopra considered Bharadwaj young to play the role. Then Bharadwaj was offered to play Nakul and Sahadev, but he rejected and wanted to play Abhimanyu. Days later, he was called and finalized to play Krishna. Firoz Khan was chosen to portray the character of Arjuna (which he later adopted as his screen name, to not become confused with a more popular actor of the same name) despite being rejected in auditions. Asian games gold medalist Praveen Kumar was selected to portray Bhima after Chopra was looking for someone "who could look the robust historical character". Around six actresses were shortlisted for the role of Draupadi, including Juhi Chawla, who opted out of the show as she had bagged a film. Ramya Krishnan and Roopa Ganguly were the final names, and at last Roopa Ganguly was chosen, as her Hindi was good. Govinda and Chunky Pandey were signed for the role of Abhimanyu, but they opted out when they bagged films. Later, Master Mayur played the role. Mukesh Khanna who wished to play role of Arjun was initially offered the role of Duryodhan. But later he was signed for Dhronacharya. When Vijayendra Ghadge dropped his role of Bhisma, Khanna got the role of Bhishma. Puneet Issar was offered to play the role of Bheem but was cast as Duryodhan on his wish. The casting director of the show, Gufi Paintal was offered role of Shakuni by the makers of Mahabharat.

== Music ==
Mahabharat's music was composed by Raj Kamal and lyrics were penned by Pandit Narendra Sharma and Bhring Tupkari. Some songs were taken from works of devotional writers like Surdas, Raskhan etc. Apart from main songs there are also several short couplets, which covered the summary of each episode. All of these verses were sung by Mahendra Kapoor.

All music is composed by Raj Kamal.

No.	Title	Singer(s)	Length
1.	"Ath Shree Mahabharat Katha (Opening Theme)"	Mahendra Kapoor	04:12
2.	"Bharat Ki Yeh Kahaani (Ending Theme)"	Mahendra Kapoor	05:21
3.	"Beet Gaye Din Par Din Beet Gaye"	Raj Kamal	05:23
4.	"Govind Gokul Aayo"	Raj Kamal	04:49
5.	"Jagiye Brijraj Kunwar"	Kavita Krishnamurthy	04:10
6.	"Main Naahin Maakhan Khaayo"	Nitin Mukesh	05:20
7.	"Maiya Mohi Dau Bahut Khijayo"	Nitin Mukesh	04:00
8.	"Shyam ne Murli Madhur"	Suresh Wadkar	05:42
9.	"Mor Pakha Seer Upar Rakhiyo"	Kavita Krishnamurthy	04:16
10.	"Mohan Ke Mukh Par Bansari"	Raj Kamal and Kavita Krishnamurthy	07:01
11.	"Binati Suniye Nath Hamari"	Sadhana Sargam	04:51
12.	"Beti Chali Paraye Desh"	Raj Kamal	07:05
13.	"Kripa Krishna Ki"	Raj Kamal	07:01
14.	"Main Boondan Bheeji Saari"	Sadhana Sargam	04:30
15.	"Pranay Ke Pratham Prahar Ki Baat"	Anuradha Paudwal	05:20
16.	"Samay Bada Balwaan"	Raj Kamal	05:17
17.	"Jhanak Jhanak Baaje Payaliya"	Sadhana Sargam	04:51
18.	"Manwa Madhur Madhur Kachu Bol"	Sadhana Sargam	04:04
19.	"Naino Ke Darpan mein"	Roopa Ganguly	03:27
20.	"Sabso Onchi Prem Sagai"	Raj Kamal	05:44
21.	"Yeh Dharma Yudh Hain"	Raj Kamal	10:30
22.	"Hey Priyatame"	Raj Kamal	06:16

== Broadcast ==
In India the series was originally broadcast on DD National, which was India's only nationwide television channel at the time. It is estimated that over 650 million people saw the live broadcast. Period news media reported that viewers would light incense and make offerings to the actors, expecting to receive darshan of the deities. In areas with limited electricity, televisions were set up in public spaces, sometimes run by tractor batteries. Inopportune power cuts during the broadcast in Uttar Pradesh and elsewhere led to outrage from the general public, who attacked local electric transformers.

It was shown in the United Kingdom by the BBC, where it achieved audience figures of 5 million. The series ran on BBC Two on a Saturday afternoon and repeated on BBC One late Sunday nights which both were at the time a slot for Asian viewers. Episodes were shown between 14 April 1990 and 25 April 1992 with a short break in September 1990. It was also the first programme broadcast on BBC Two after its 1991 revamp.

The show was again telecast on DD Bharati from 28 March 2020, on DD Retro from 13 April 2020, on Colors TV from 4 May 2020 as well as Star Bharat during the lockdown due to coronavirus.

== Reception ==
Ganguly was applauded for her performance in the Vastraharan sequence in which Draupadi is disrobed. Ravi Chopra later disclosed that she was originally weeping while enacting in the Vastraharan sequence and the crew members had to console her later to make her stop. The sequence is often claimed to be the most climactic one of the series. For the sequence Chopra recreated the visual effect of the Vastraharan sequence of Babubhai Mistry's Mahabharat (1965) starring Padmini as Draupadi. His visual effects won more favour than that of the 1965 film and has still been considered by a part of critics to be the most brilliant in line. of the most successful television series in Indian television history. In common with the "Ramayana" serial, the broadcasting of a Mahabharat episode was associated with the simultaneous emptying of streets in the cities and people leaving work early to watch it. Along with general audience many big names from Hindi film industry like Rajesh Khanna, Amitabh Bachchan, Jeetendra, Hema Malini and Dharmendra also praised the show.

During its rerun in COVID-19 lockdown in India, it became the second most watched Indian TV show after Ramayan (1987). In week 13, it garnered 145.8 million impressions with both morning and evening slots combined on DD Bharati. After Ramayan ended, Mahabharat became the most watched TV show until its end. The series ended with 22.9 million viewership.

== Home media ==
The series was uploaded onto the website "Rajshri.com" along with its dubbed Tamil version. Home video of the Bengali-dubbed version of this series has been released by Heart Video. In 2019, Pen India Ltd bought the rights of the show and uploaded all the episodes on its devotional YouTube channel Pen Bhakti including its spin-off series Mahabharat Katha.

== Legacy ==
Mahabharat along with Ramayan (1987), became one of the most successful television series based on an epic in Indian television history.

Many actors became popular through their appearances in this series.

- Nitish Bharadwaj became famous as Lord Krishna and later he also played lead role in Chopra's another mythological show Vishnu Puran as well as Chopra's RAMAYAN.
- Roopa Ganguly, who played Draupadi, went on to become a successful actress in Bengali cinema.
- Pankaj Dheer received immense popularity after playing Karna. His pictures are used in textbooks as reference to Karna and the actor also revealed that his statues are worshipped in temples in Karnal and Bastar.
- Firoz Khan changed his name to "Arjun" professionally after finding success with the role of Arjun.
- Mukesh Khanna shot to fame as Bhishma and named his production company after his character.
