= Arjun: The Warrior Prince =

- Theatrical release poster
- Directed by: Arnab Chaudhuri
- Written by: Rajesh Devraj
- Produced by: Ronnie Screwvala; Siddharth Roy Kapur
- Cinematography: Hemant Chaturvedi
- Edited by: A. Sreekar Prasad
- Music by: Songs: Vishal–Shekhar; Background Score: Dhruv Ghanekar
- Production companies: Walt Disney Pictures; UTV Motion Pictures
- Distributed by: UTV Motion Pictures
- Release date: 25 May 2012
- Running time: 96 minutes
- Country: India
- Language: Hindi

Arjun: The Warrior Prince is a 2012 Indian animated action film, directed by Arnab Chaudhuri, written by Rajesh Devraj, and produced by Ronnie Screwvala and Siddharth Roy Kapur under UTV Motion Pictures and Walt Disney Pictures. The film tells the story of Mahabharata from Arjun’s point of view. The film was released in India on 25 May 2012.

A sequel to the film was planned but it was never completed and Disney shut down UTV Motion Pictures in 2017.

== Plot ==
The story is based on the early life of Prince Arjuna, loosely taken from the ancient Indian epic Mahabharata. The storyline begins with Arjun as a nine-year-old boy and follows him until he grows into the warrior that the world knows him as. It explores his life with his brothers in Hastinapur, his training and education, and his ultimate discovery of the warrior within himself.

The film begins with Uttar, the young prince of Viratnagar (Kingdom of King Virata), asking a maid (Brihannala) to tell him a story. The maid narrates him the story of Arjun.

She tells him that Arjun was a student of Drona and that he learned the art of warfare from him. He was more skilled than all the students of Drona. None of his own brothers nor his cousins - the hundred Kauravas - could equal him in the art. Duryodhana and the other Kauravas despised the Pandavas, for they feared that they might usurp Duryodhana's throne. When the king Dhritrashtra grew older, the rivalry between his sons, the Kauravas and the Pandavas, intensified. Twice, Duryodhana attempted to kill all the Pandavas but failed. To avoid further conflict, Dhritrashtra proclaimed Duryodhana as the crown prince of Hastinapur and asked Yudhishthira to be the king of a distant, unkempt territory of the empire.

In the meantime, Arjun won a swayamvar and married the daughter of the King of Panchala, Draupadi. Duryodhana, who loathed the Pandavas, hatched a conspiracy with his uncle Shakuni and won all that belonged to the Pandavas in a betting game called chaupar. After losing everything, Yudhishthira betted his own brothers, Draupadi, and even himself. Draupadi was insulted in front of everyone, but Arjuna could not say anything because Yudhishthira was the king, and the king's words are the last words. The Pandavas, according to the rules of the game, had to go into exile for twelve years and an agyatavasa (hiding) for one year. While all the Pandavas go one way, Arjuna travels north to do tapasya. Before leaving, Draupadi makes him promise that he will take revenge for her insult. He then leaves and does tapasya, during which he earns a bow from the Lord Shiva.

The story then shifts back to the present-day Viratnagar. It is revealed that the Pandavas are spending their secret exile, or 'agyatavasa', there and are noticed by some of the spies of Duryodhana. According to the outcome of the game, if any one of the Pandavas is found before the end of that one year, the Pandavas will have to again go for a twelve-year exile. The spy informs Duryodhana that the Pandavas are in Viratnagar. So he launches an attack on Viratnagar with the help of his bandit friends. The king of Viratnagar leaves to thrash the marauding bandits. However, that is the bait. From the other direction, Duryodhana's army comes, and it seems that the young prince of Viratnagar is the only one who is left to fight.

Uttar's maid drives the young prince's chariot to the field, but the prince, distraught by the number of enemies, flees. The maid stops him and reveals her true identity: Brihannala comes out as Arjun. Arjun retrieves his bow and makes prince Uttar drive his chariot. The warrior massacres the army and emerges victorious, and at last, Arjuna alone defeats all Kaurava warriors, including Bhisma and Drona.

== Cast ==
- Yuddvir Bakolia as Arjun
- Aanjjan Srivastav as Kirat/Lord Shiva
- Sachin Khedekar as Lord Krishna
- Rajeshwari Sachdev as Draupadi
- Ashok Banthia as Bheem
- Ravi Khanwilkar as Drona
- Hemant Mahaur as Duryodhan
- Brijesh Jha as Yudhishthir
- Vijay Kashyap as Shakuni
- Ila Arun as Kunti
- Vishnu Sharma as Bheeshma

== Development and production ==
Animation for the film is provided by Tata Elxsi. According to Chaudhary, "When UTV pitched the idea of ‘Arjun' to me, I was thrilled. I had trained in animation at National Institute of Design years back. My writer Rajesh Devraj and I started developing the story and pooled in talent from NID for everything from character design to costume design. We eventually had a team of 300 professionals including those from Tata Elxsi."

Chaudhary told The Telegraph, " We took a theatre group that is run by K.K. Raina and Ila Arun and did the whole voiceover in the form of a play. As a result, what you get is people interacting with each other and lending their voices to the characters in my film instead of dubbing them from separate booths." And "for the action, we did a two-week workshop with a Kalaripayattu troupe from Kerala and a Thang-Ta troupe from Manipur — both of which represent very diverse martial art forms. We put them together on a mountaintop for two weeks and made them fight each other. What we got were results that I wouldn’t even hope to achieve if I was using live-action actors."

== Soundtrack ==
Arjun: The Warrior Prince

Soundtrack album by Vishal–Shekhar
- Released: 2012
- Genre: Feature film soundtrack
- Language: Hindi
- Label: UTV Music
- Producer: Ronnie Screwvala

Vishal–Shekhar chronology
Kahaani (2012)	Arjun: The Warrior Prince (2012)	Shanghai (2012)

Distributed and released by Walt Disney Records and UTV Music, the soundtrack of Arjun: The Warrior Prince is composed by Vishal–Shekhar with lyrics by Piyush Mishra, while Dhruv Ghanekar composed the background score.

No.	Title	Singer(s)	Length
1.	"Daanav"	Vishal Dadlani, Shankar Mahadevan	3:37
2.	"Karam Ki Talwar"	Sukhwinder Singh	4:19
3.	"Manva"	Swanand Kirkire, Shreya Ghoshal, Piyush Mishra, Raja Hasan	4:29
4.	"Kabhi Na Dekhe Hastinapur Mein"	Shreya Ghoshal, Sunidhi Chauhan, Shubha Mudgal, Ila Arun	3:02
5.	"Samay"	Shekhar Ravjiani, Hemant Brijwasi	5:32
6.	"Khandav"	Keerthi Sagathia	4:09

== Release ==
The film was released in India on 25 May 2012. In the United States, Walt Disney Studios Motion Pictures held a week-long limited engagement on 1 September 2012 at the El Capitan Theater to qualify for Academy Awards consideration. However, the film was not nominated.

== Reception ==
=== Critical response ===
On the review aggregator website Rotten Tomatoes, 67% of 9 critics' reviews are positive, with an average rating of 5.7/10. Anuj Kumar of The Hindu gave the film 4 out of 5, calling it "a world class show with a good old Indian touch". Rajeev Masand of CNN-IBN gave the film 3 stars out of 5, concluding that "I'm going to with three out of five for Arjun: The Warrior Prince. Like its hero, the film too is a valiant effort, and an interesting interpretation of a much-loved mythological story. Worth a watch". Robert Abele of Los Angeles Times gave the film 3 out of 5 stars stating "The animation is at times stiff and presentational, like a rushed rotoscoping job, but there's a charming majesty to the enterprise".

Coversely, Rachel Saltz of The New York Times gave the film 2 out of 5, writing, "An action movie, 'Arjun' takes story liberties, but not always in the service of clarity. (The script is by Rajesh Devraj.) Children will probably be confused, and adults familiar with the tale may wonder where all the good bits went." Lou Lumenick of New York Post gave the film 2 out of 5, writing, "Even though the title character vaguely resembles Disney’s Tarzan, nobody is going to mistake the less-than-state-of-the-art, computer-game-style 2-D animation for the work of the American parent, much less its Pixar subsidiary."

=== Box office ===
The film earned ₹24.4 million worldwide against the budget of ₹75 million.

=== Accolades ===
Year	Name of Competition\Award	Category	Result	Recipient(s)/Nominee(s)
2013	FICCI BAF Awards	Best Indian Animated Feature Film[Theatrical Release]	Won	Tata Elxsi
2013	2013 Annecy International Animated Film Festival	Cristal Award for Best Film	Nominated	Arnab Chaudhuri
2013	19th Screen Awards	Best Animation	Nominated	Arjun: The Warrior Prince

== Other media ==
An adventure video game was released for mobile platforms to accompany the film's release by UTV Indiagames.

== Cancelled sequel ==
In December 2012, Arnab Chaudhari announced a sequel to the film was in the works. He further stated that "It will take about three years to complete the film." However, the film was never completed and Disney shut down UTV Motion Pictures in 2017.

== See also ==
- List of Indian animated feature films
- List of Disney theatrical animated features
- List of Walt Disney Pictures films
