= Upaplavya =

Place names in the Mahabharata epic

Upaplavya was a city in the Matsya Kingdom ruled by king Virata as per the epic Mahabharata. It was the city where the Pandavas camped and planned their strategy for the Kurukshetra War. The allies of the Pandavas held extensive meetings in the tents constructed at Upaplavya, and stayed there as guests of King Virata. Vasudeva Krishna started his famous peace mission to Hastinapura, starting his journey from Upaplavya. It took Krishna two days of travel by his chariot to reach Hastinapura from Upaplavya. The location of this city is somewhere near Viratnagar between Alwar and Jaipur in Rajasthan.
