= Maganlal Dresswala =

Indian costume supplier

- Industry: Costume design
- Founded: 1926
- Founder: Maganlal and Harilal
- Headquarters: Mumbai, India

Maganlal Dresswala or Maganlal Dresswala & Co. is a noted costumer and costume designer for Bollywood productions. Established in 1926 as a small shop in Kalbadevi, Mumbai, it is most known for its period costumes, in Ram Rajya (1943) Mughal-e-Azam (1960) and Anarkali (1953), and mythological TV series Ramanand Sagar's Ramayan (1987–1988) and B.R. Chopra's Mahabharat (1988–1990).

Today, the company is the oldest costume supplier in Indian cinema and is mentioned as such in the Limca Book of Records 2012 as it was the costumer for first Indian talkie, Alam Ara (1931).

== History ==
The company started as a small shop in Kalbadevi, near Marine Lines, Mumbai, where brothers Maganlal and Harilal started selling headgear for bridegrooms, like pagadi, sehra and safas. Gradually they shifted to providing wardrobe and costume coordination to local Ramleela theatrical productions. This led to historical and mythological films which were the rage in Bollywood (Hindi cinema), working for noted films like Vijay Bhatt's Ram Rajya (1943), K. Asif's Mughal-e-Azam (1960) and Anarkali (1953). They also provided costumes for productions of Parsi theatre. Soon they became a leading provider of wardrobe and costumes; they rented out furniture, set decoration items, and costume accessories, and ventured into exports. Over the years, the company has opened several outlets across Mumbai.

By the 1980s, the company started catering to the rising television industry, most notable the epic series Ramayan (1987–1988), directed by Ramanand Sagar, followed by Mahabharat (1988–1990) by B.R. Chopra and Shyam Benegal's Bharat Ek Khoj (1988). In 1997, the company organized an auction of costumes, which included costumes from Mughal-e-Azam. Today, the company is also famous for supplying annual Navratri garba dance costumes. People from Gujarat, Bengal and even outside India (mostly NRIs), start coming months in advance. The third generation of the family, Sarika Dresswala is the company's head designer.

In 2012, Dresswala, a documentary film directed by Shriya Pilgaonkar, that traces the evolution of Indian cinema through the rise of Maganlal Dresswala, was shown at the 14th Mumbai Film Festival.
