= Uttarā =

Wife of Abhimanyu in the Indian epic Mahabharata

- Mahabharata character
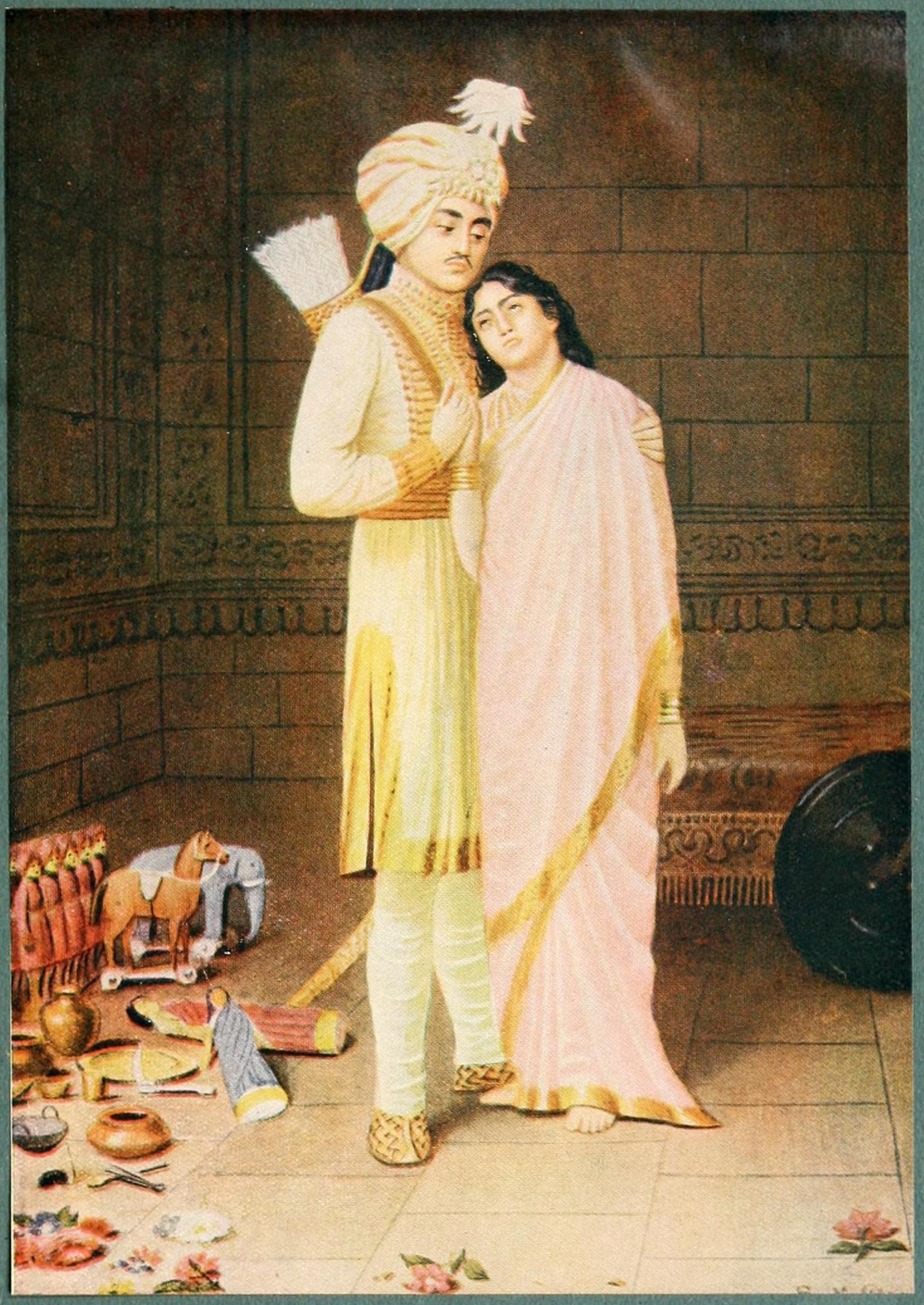
- Abhimanyu consoles Uttarā before leaving for the war, illustration by S.N. Das

Information
- Family: Virata (father); Sudeshna (mother); Uttara (brother); Shankha (brother)
- Spouse: Abhimanyu
- Children: Parikshit
- Origin: Matsya Kingdom

Uttarā (Sanskrit: उत्तरा, romanized: Uttarā) is a character in the ancient Hindu epic Mahabharata. She was the princess of Matsya, and the daughter of King Virata and Queen Sudeshna, at whose court the Pandavas—the central figures of the epic—spent a year in concealment during their exile. During this period, she learned music and dance from Arjuna, the third Pandava, and later married his son, Abhimanyu. Uttarā was widowed at a young age during the Kurukshetra War. Following the Pandavas' victory in the war, she and her unborn son were attacked by Ashvatthama, and were saved by the divine intervention of Krishna. Her son Parikshit saved the Kuru lineage from extinction, and became a well-known monarch celebrated in both the Mahabharata and the Bhagavata Purana.

== Etymology ==
The Sanskrit name Uttarā is derived from the word Uttara by adding a feminine termination ā. It can have multiple meanings; according to British Indologist Monier Williams, in this context, it means 'upper,' 'higher,' 'superior,' or 'excellent'. The word is also used to denote the 'North direction', as well as 'an answer'. The male form of the name also appears in the Mahabharata as the name of her elder brother.

== Literary background ==
Uttarā is a significant character in the Mahabharata, one of the Sanskrit epics from the Indian subcontinent. The work is written in Classical Sanskrit and is a composite work of revisions, editing and interpolations over many centuries. The oldest parts in the surviving version of the text may date to near 400 BCE.

The Mahabharata manuscripts exist in numerous versions, wherein the specifics and details of major characters and episodes vary, often significantly. Except for the sections containing the Bhagavad Gita which is remarkably consistent between the numerous manuscripts, the rest of the epic exists in many versions. The differences between the Northern and Southern recensions are particularly significant, with the Southern manuscripts more profuse and longer. Scholars have attempted to construct a critical edition, relying mostly on a study of the "Bombay" edition, the "Poona" edition, the "Calcutta" edition and the "south Indian" editions of the manuscripts. The most accepted version is one prepared by scholars led by Vishnu Sukthankar at the Bhandarkar Oriental Research Institute, preserved at Kyoto University, Cambridge University and various Indian universities.

Uttarā also appears in few of the later written Puranic scriptures, most prominent being the Krishna-related Bhagavata Purana.

== Biography ==
According to the Mahabharata, Uttarā was born to Virata, the king of Matsya Kingdom, and his consort Sudeshna, the daughter of Suta king of Kekaya. She had two elder brothers—Uttara and Shankha—and a half sibling Shveta.

Uttarā is introduced into the main narrative in the Virata Parva, the fourth book of the epic, which narrates about the last year of the exile of the five Pandava brothers and their common wife Draupadi, which they had to spend in anonymity. They stayed together in the Matsya and took various disguises in the court of Virata. The third Pandava Arjuna lived as a eunuch named Brihannala, and was appointed as the tutor of Uttarā, teaching her the skills of dance, instrumental and vocal music that he had learned from the apsaras in heaven. Uttarā is praised by Arjuna for being exceptionally talented. After the end of their exile, the Pandavas revealed their real identities to Virata. Virata immediately offered Uttarā's hand in marriage to Arjuna, but he refused, reasoning that the relation a teacher has with a student is like that of a parent to a child. Instead, Arjuna suggested that Uttarā become his daughter-in-law by marrying his son Abhimanyu. With approval from both sides, the marriage ceremony of Uttarā and Abhimanyu was held in the city of Upaplavya in presence of their relatives and allies. While residing in Upaplavya, the Pandavas were approached by a poor brahmin who, upon seeing Uttarā, prophesied that she would give birth to a son when the Kuru dynasty ends and for that reason he would be called Parikshit (lit. 'One who has been tested')."

The next few parvas (books) of the Mahabharata describes the Kurukshetra War fought between the Pandavas and their cousins Kauravas, in which Matsya allied with the Pandavas. Uttarā lost her father, brothers and entire Matsya army in the course of the war. She was also widowed at a very young age when Abhimanyu, himself only sixteen years old, was killed in the war. Overwhelmed with grief at the sight of her husband's body, she was consoled by her uncle-in-law and the divine avatara Krishna. Her grief and lamentation on seeing her husband's corpse is again illustrated in the Stri Parva by Gandhari, the mother of Kauravas.

After the conclusion of the Kurukshetra War, which ended in the victory of the Pandavas, Ashwatthama—the son of Dronacharya, who was the commander-in-chief of the Kaurava forces—tried to avenge their defeat by massacring the remaining Pandava army. This incident is chronicled in the Sauptika Parva. Ashwatthama was confronted by Arjuna and aware of his inability to defeat Arjuna with conventional means, Ashwatthama resorted to invoking the powerful divine weapon known as Brahmashira. In response, Arjuna also prepared to unleash a Brahmashira. Narada and Vyasa, revered sages of Hindu mythology, intervened and instructed both warriors to withdraw their celestial weapons. Arjuna complied with their directive and withdrew the Brahmashira he had unleashed. However, Ashwatthama lacked the ability to retract the Brahmashira once it was invoked, as he did not possess the requisite control over the weapon. Driven by a consuming desire for vengeance, Ashwatthama decided that if he could not annihilate the Pandavas, he would eliminate their lineage. In a heinous act, he directed the Brahmashira towards Uttarā's womb, ultimately leading to the death of the unborn child. However, Krishna assured that the child would be saved and furious at the thought of a warrior turning his weapons on an unborn child, he cursed Ashwatthama to live for millennia, completely alone and burdened by diseases, repelled by the stench of his own pus. The Ashvamedhika Parva attests about Parikshit's birth. When Uttarā went into labour, the child was born dead; she was consoled by other royal women. When Krishna arrived to visit her, she cried to him and reminded him of his earlier assurance to save her child. Using his divine powers, Krishna revived the stillborn baby, and the infant was then named Parikshit, meaning 'he who has been tested'.

Uttarā's last appearance in the Mahabharata is in the Ashramavasika Parva. Fifteen years after the war, the Kuru elders Dhritarashtra, Gandhari, Kunti, and Vidura departed for the forest. Uttarā, along with other royal family members, accompanied them for a distance before returning back to the capital city. At the end of the epic, when the Pandavas finally renounced the world, Uttarā's mother-in-law, Subhadra, was entrusted to take care of the young Parikshit, who was installed as the new monarch of Hastinapur. Uttarā might have lived her remaining life as the queen-mother.

== Legacy ==
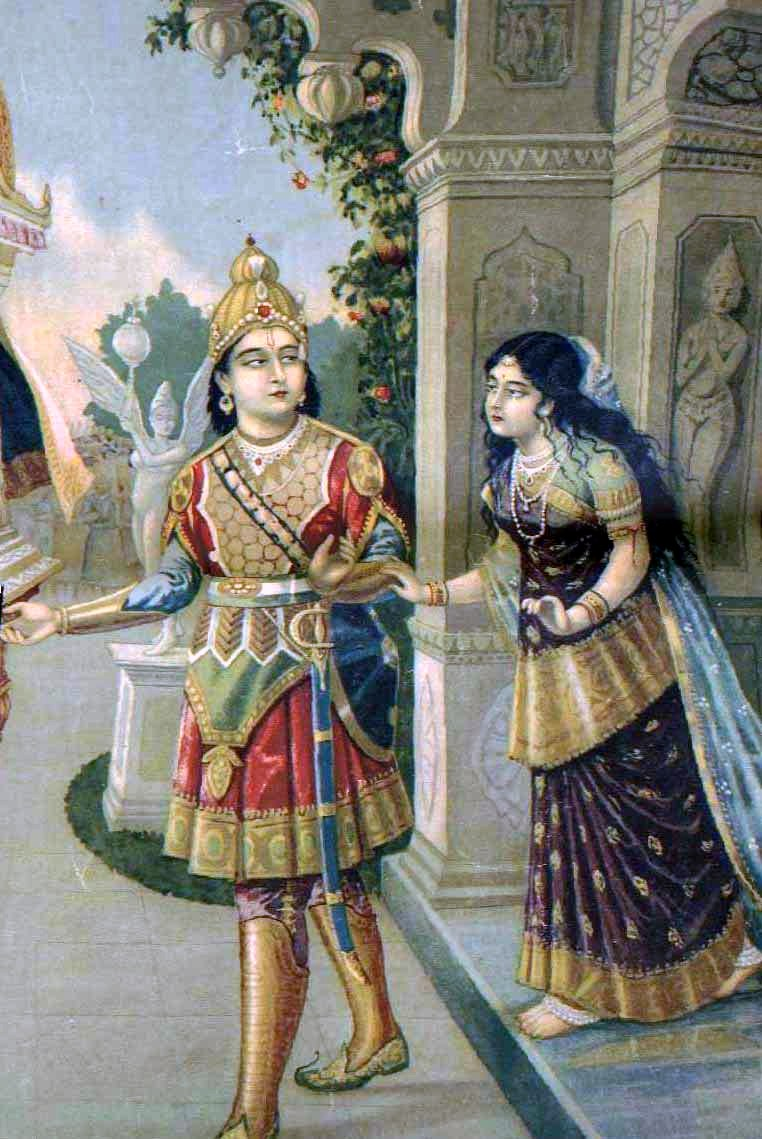
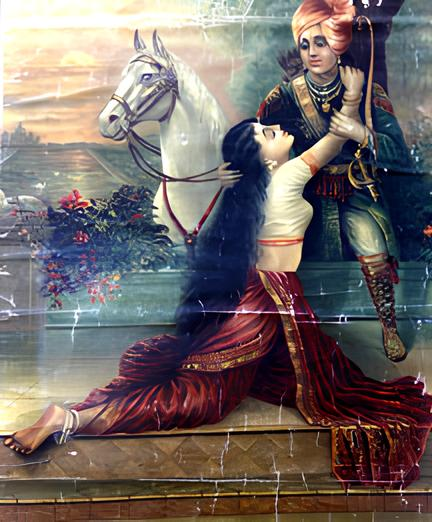
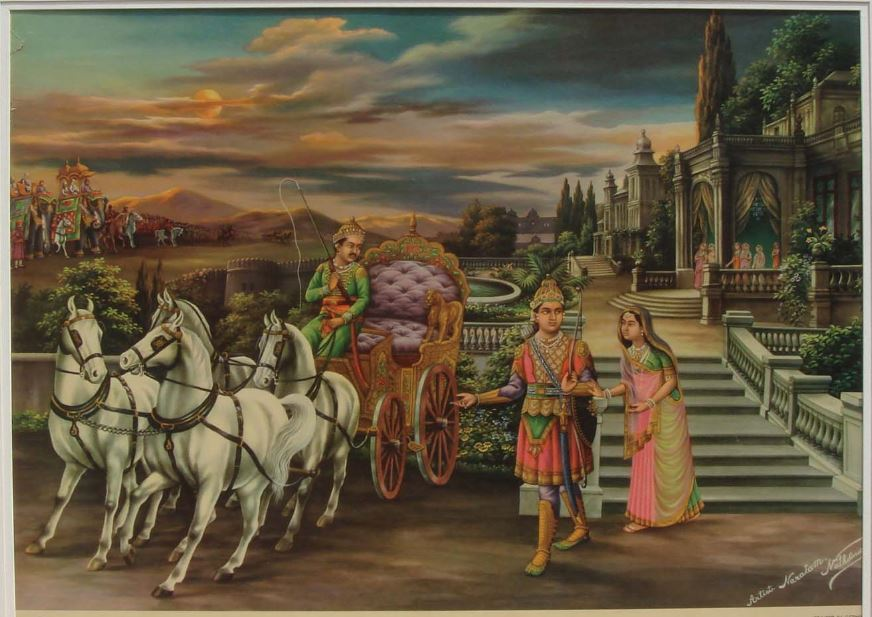
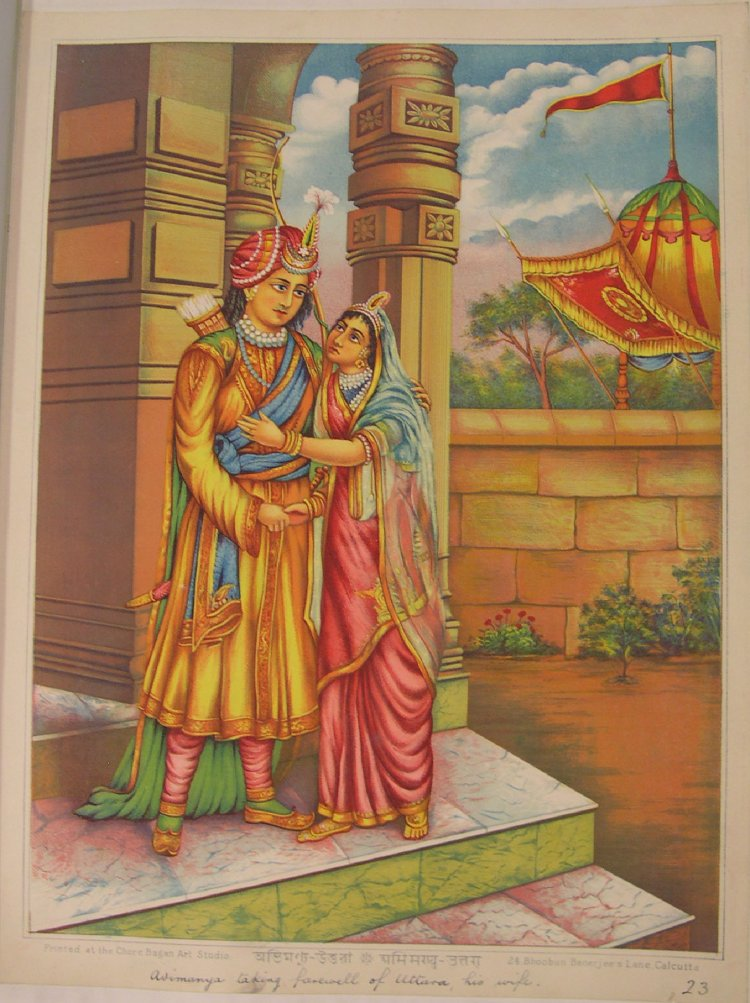
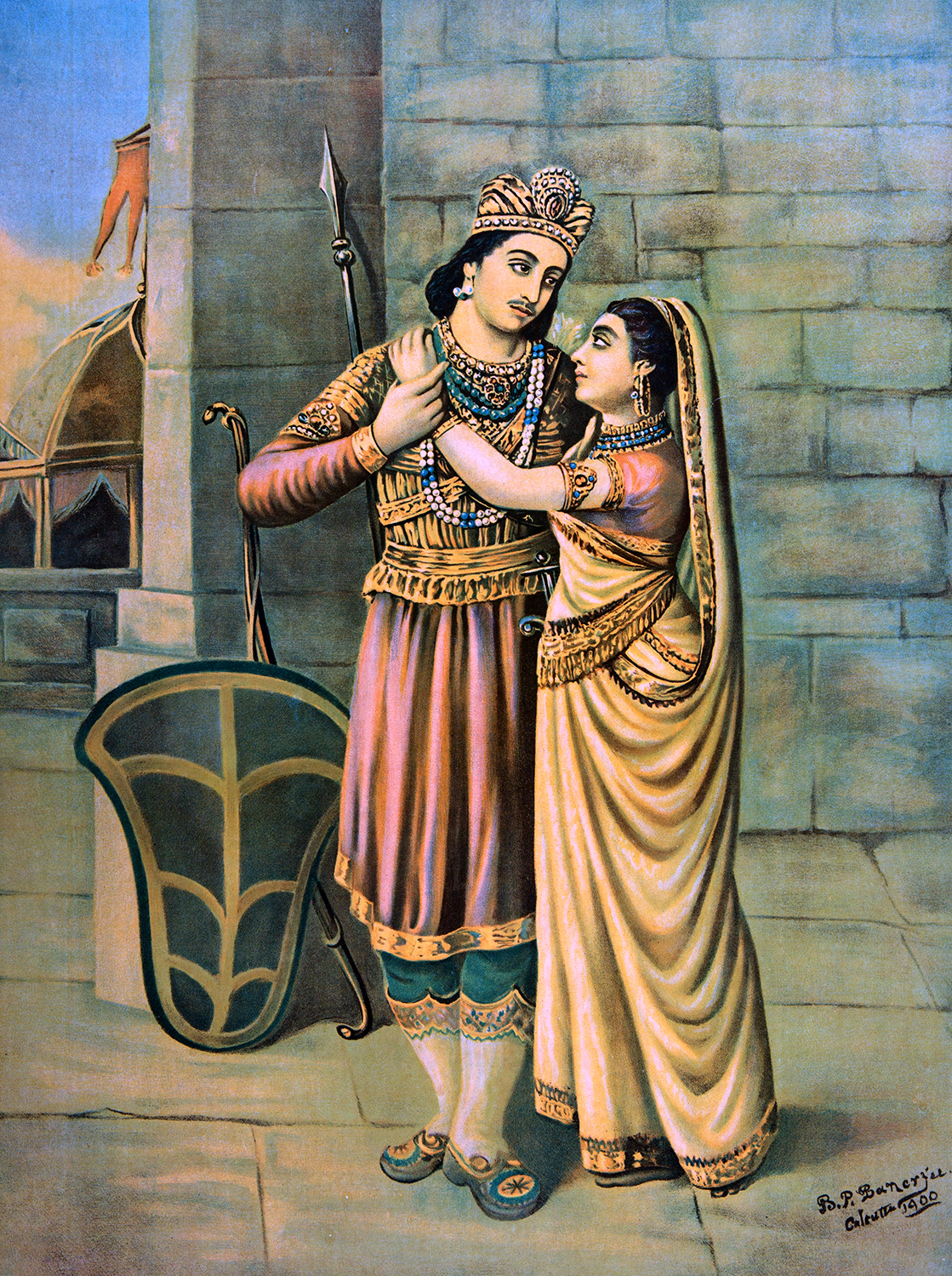
Uttarā's pleadings before Abhimanyu's departure for the Kurukshetra War was a common theme for prints during the early 20th century.

Uttarā is an important figure in Krishna-centric sects of Hinduism. According to Puranic scriptures, years after Krishna's death, his biography was narrated to her son Parikshit by Shuka, the son of sage Vyasa, which was then compiled as the Bhagavata Purana. The episode of Krishna saving Uttarā's son is also narrated in these scriptures, but vary from the accounts provided in the Mahabharata. According to it, after the weapon released by Ashwatthama struck Uttarā, she rushed to Krishna fearing abortion. Krishna entered her womb as a soul and saved Parikshit, due to which he was also called Vishnurata.

The details of Krishna's iconography is popularly attributed to Uttarā. According to a popular narrative in the region of Braja and Rajasthan, Vajranabh—the great grandson of Krishna—desired to see Krishna's manifest form, as he succeeded to the throne of Dvaraka. However, there was no existing model to guide him. Vajranabh sought out living witnesses: Uttara, who was now the aged queen-mother of Hastinapur, and Uddhava, Krishna's friend. Uttarā provided a vivid detailed description, but the sculptors failed to replicate Krishna satisfactorily. They enlisted the help of these eyewitnesses and prayed for divine manifestation, which resulted in appearance as a triad: Govind Dev, Gopinath, and Madan Mohan. However, none of the figures fully encapsulatesd Krishna's form, each succeeding in certain aspects and falling short in others. Despite their shortcomings, each of these images would henceforth become an important object of worship in its own right, although, they are believed to have disappeared for a long time before their rediscovery during the medieval period. According to mythologist Devdutt Pattnaik, a variation of the tale adds other important icons of Krishna—which were crafted based on Uttarā's description. (Note: Banke Bihari of Vrindavan, Ranchor-rai of Dakor in Gujarat, Srinath-ji of Nathdwara in Udaipur, Sakshi Gopal of Odisha, Vitthala of Pandharpur in Maharashtra, Krishna of Udupi in Karnataka, Venkateswara of Tirumala in Andhra Pradesh, Ranganatha of Srirangam in Tamil Nadu, and Guruvayur-appan in Kerala.) These icons spread across India, and have become central to the Bhagavata culture of Hinduism. Historians view these narrative as a cultural construct rooted in faith rather than empirical evidence.
