= Sudeshna =

Character in the Hindu epic Mahabharata

- Mahabharata character
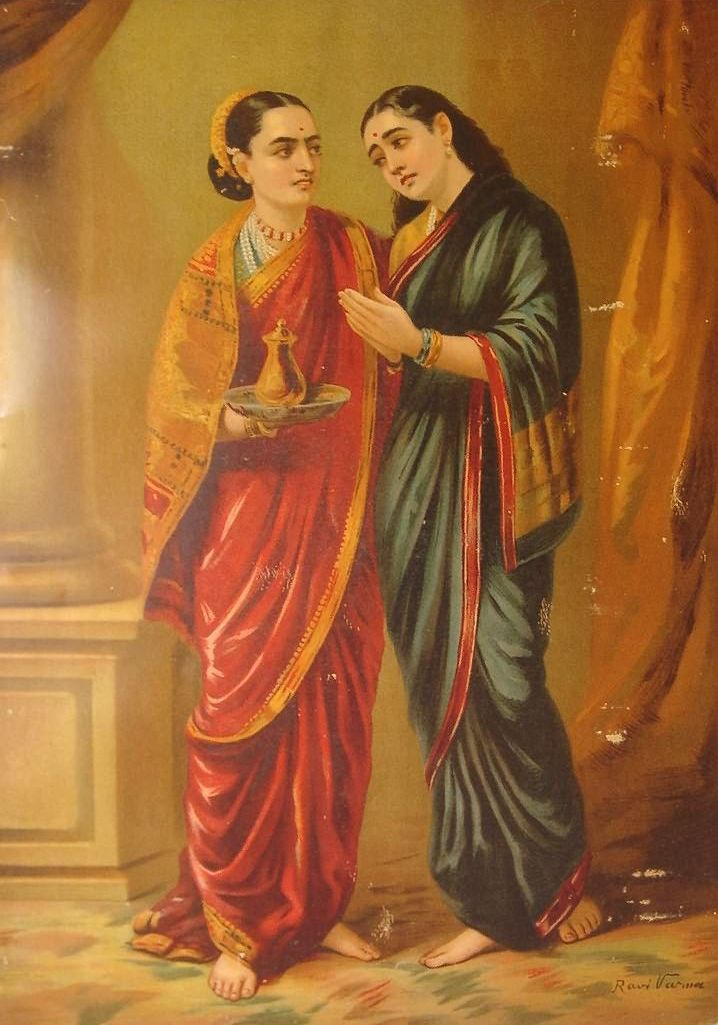
- Sudeshna (right) orders Sairandhri (Draupadi in her incognito form) to carry wine into Kichaka's room

Information
- Position: Queen of Matsya Kingdom
- Family: Malavi (mother); Kekaya (father); Kichaka and 105 Upakichakas (younger brothers)
- Spouse: Virata
- Children: Uttara; Uttarā; Shankha

In the Hindu epic Mahabharata, Sudeshna was the wife of King Virata, at whose court the Pandavas spent a year in concealment during their exile. She was the mother of Uttara, Uttarā, and Shankha.

Sudeshna was the daughter of Queen Malavi and a lord of the Kekayas.

== Legend ==
During the Pandavas' 13th year of exile, Sudeshna unknowingly plays host to the Pandavas and Draupadi. Draupadi poses as her maid, Sairandhri. Sudeshna is looking out her room window one day and sees Draupadi wandering in the market. Stunned at her beauty, Sudeshna inquires about her afterwards. Draupadi poses as Sairandhri, saying that she is a former lady-in-waiting from Indraprastha, now without a job after the Pandavas had lost their kingdom. Suspicious of her story, since Sairandhri looks and carries herself like royalty, Sudeshna chastises herself for being so paranoid and hires Sairandhri. Sairandhri proves to be a loyal and efficient handmaiden.

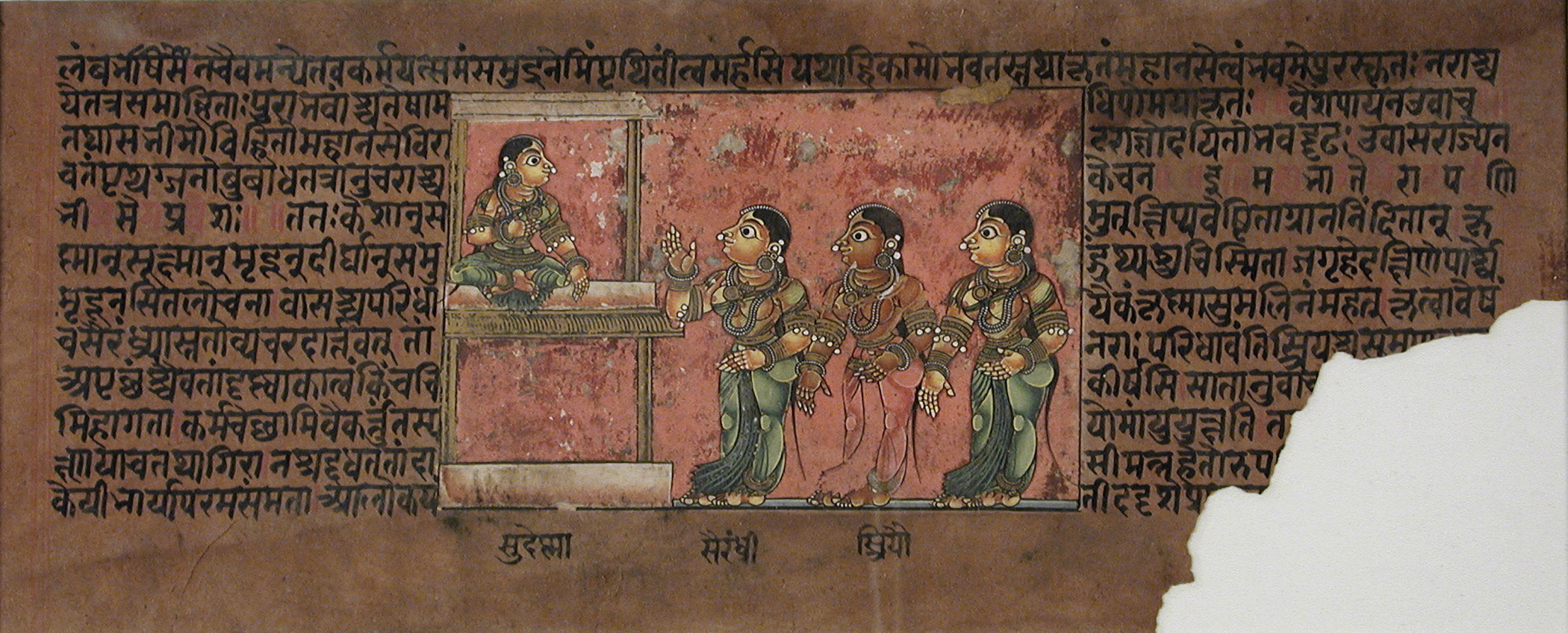
Sudeshna on the throne (left) is greeted by Draupadi and other ladies-in-waiting

Kichaka notices Sairandhri and is overcome by her beauty and inquires Sudeshna about her. Sudeshna conveys Kichaka's interest in Sairandhri. Sairandhri rebukes Kichaka, telling her that she is already married to a gandharva who would kill any man who touched her. Unable to deny her older brother, and wary of the king's warnings to not displease their city's top commander-in-chief, Sudeshna introduces Kichaka to Sairandhri. She does this by asking Sairandhri to fetch wine from Kichaka's house; she refuses to heed Sairandhri's warnings yet again. The moment Sairandhri arrives, Kichaka tries to molest her. Sairandhri looks to Sudeshna for aid, but the queen is silent.

Later, when Kichaka dies under mysterious circumstances (killed by Bhima), Sudeshna becomes terrified and begs Sairandhri for forgiveness. Having seen her words come true, Sudeshna recognizes that Sairandhri is no ordinary woman. Believing that Sairandhri's words will become truthful, Sudeshna counsels her husband against punishing Sairandhri for Kichaka's death.

When the Susarma and the Trigartas attack Matsya, Sudeshna sees her husband and the army off. Later, when the Kauravas attack from the other direction, she attempts to organize the city defences only to find that few soldiers have remained. Her young son, Uttara, brags that he will single-handedly defeat the Kauravas, and gets ready to ride out. Knowing her son will be killed, Sudeshna tries to talk him down. Sairandhri chimes in that Uttara should take Brihannala (Arjuna in disguise) as his charioteer, saying that if Uttara did so, no harm would come to him. Uttara attempts to decline, not wanting to have his chariot in the hands of a woman. However, Sudeshna overrules him saying that if Sairandhri said it, it must be true. Thus, when Uttara faces the Kauravas, it is Arjuna who actually defeats all of them and prevents Uttara from dying and Matsya from falling.

After the skirmish, the Pandavas reveal themselves. Sudeshna is horrified that Draupadi endured such treatment under her roof. However, Draupadi and the Pandavas quickly forgive them, thanking the royal pair for giving them shelter. Uttarā is married to Arjuna's son, Abhimanyu. Virata immediately pledges to support the Pandavas' cause to regain their kingdom, and his army as well as Sudeshna's children fight with the Pandavas in the Kurukshetra War.

On the first day, Sudeshna suffers the loss of two of her sons. By the war's end, her husband, her children, and the entire Matsya army are wiped out in a Pandava victory. However, her grandson, Parikshit, becomes the new heir of a reunified Hastinapura. Sudeshna is present for Parikshit's birth. She is one of the ones who implore Krishna to intervene and save her grandson (as he was stillborn).
