= Brihannala =

Character in the Hindu epic Mahabharata

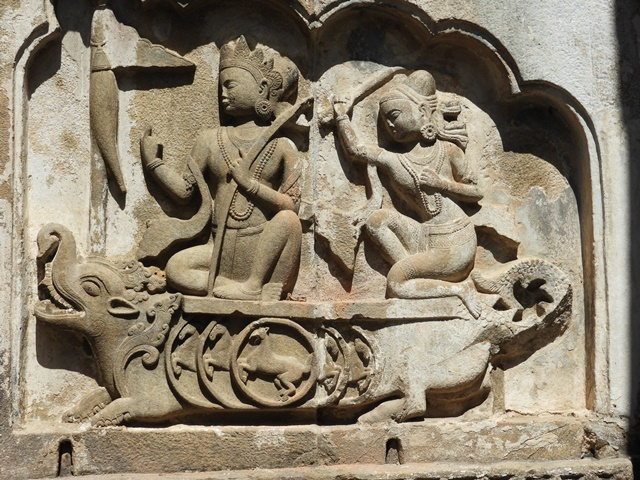
- A sculpture depicting Arjuna as Brihannala (left), along with princess Uttarā
- First appearance: Mahabharata

In-universe information
- Gender: Third gender

Brihannala or Vrihannala (Sanskrit: बृहन्नला, Bṛhannalā) is the identity assumed by Arjuna, one of the five Pandavas in the Hindu epic of Mahabharata. Brihannala is described as a klība (a Sanskrit term used to refer to neutral gender), and serves as a dance and music instructor in the court of King Virata of Matsya kingdom. Arjuna assumes this identity during the thirteenth year of the Pandavas' exile as per the conditions imposed upon the Pandavas after their defeat in a game of dice against the Kauravas. Arjuna's transformation is explained as possible due to a curse by the apsara Urvashi, which forces him to live in a gender-transformed state for a year.

== Background ==
Arjuna is the third of the five Pandava brothers, and is conceived by his mother Kunti through the invocation of Indra using a mantra granted to her by sage Durvasa. Arjuna is renowned as a skilled warrior and archer.

The Pandavas engage in a game of dice with their cousins, the Kauravas, in which they lose their kingdom and their possessions. As a result of the loss, they are sent into exile for thirteen years. As per the terms of the exile, they must remain in disguise during the thirteenth year without being recognized, and if their identities are discovered during the period, they would be forced to repeat the exile.

== Curse ==
As described in the Vana Parva of the Mahabharata, Arjuna travels to the celestial abode of his father Indra, where he is entertained by the apsaras. Among them is Urvashi, who is considered to be the most beautiful of the apsaras. While Arjuna takes dance lessons from her, she falls in love with Arjuna, and expresses a desire to marry him. However, Arjuna respectfully declines her advances, citing his status as a mortal, and it is a Pāpa (sin) to marry someone who has been his teacher. Incensed by Arjuna's rejection, Urvashi curses Arjuna to lose his masculinity. However, after Indra's intervention, the curse is modified so that it will last for one year, which can be chosen by Arjuna. Arjuna accepts the curse, as it was binding and could not be undone.

== Exile and aftermath ==
Arjuna's curse proves to be useful when the Pandavas go into disguise in the thirteenth year of their exile. As described in the Virata Parva, Arjuna takes the form of Brihannala, a klība (a Sanskrit term often used to refer to neutral gender), and serves as a dance and music instructor to Uttarā, the daughter of King Virata of the Matsya Kingdom.

Toward the end of the year, the Kauravas raid and steal cattle from the Virata kingdom. Prince Uttara, the King Virata's son, is initially tasked with confronting the Kauravas. However, he becomes frightened in the battlefield and hesitates to fight with them. Brihannala, who serves as his charioteer, reveals himself as Arjuna. Arjuna retrieves his weapons, and single-handedly defeats the invading army of the Kauravas. Though the Kauravas believe that they had discovered the Pandavas before the completion of their exile, it is later revealed that the Pandavas had managed to successfully keep their identity secret for the required time period.

After the victory, Arjuna reveals his true form to King Virata, who offers his daughter Uttarā in marriage to Arjuna. However, Arjuna declines the proposal on the grounds that he served as her teacher, and instead asks her to be given in marriage to his son Abhimanyu.
