= Prem Chowdhry =

Indian author

- Born: 1944 (age 81–82); India
- Occupations: Academic, activist, artist

Prem Chowdhry is an Indian social scientist, historian, and Senior Academic Fellow at the Indian Council of Historical Research, New Delhi. She is a feminist and critic of violence against couples refusing arranged marriages.

She is a well-known scholar of gender studies, authority on the political economy and social history of Haryana state in India.

== Career ==
Chowdhry is a Life Member of the Center for Women Studies. She has also worked at the Indian Council of Social Science Research supported Centre for Contemporary Studies, New Delhi; an advanced studies unit of Nehru Memorial Museum & Library.

Chowdhry is an alumna of Jawaharlal Nehru University, and professorial fellow of the University Grants Commission.

She has provided expert commentary to news media, including to The Guardian about the impact of prejudice against having a daughter in India; to The Guardian, Associated Press, TIME, and Reuters about "honour killings"; to The Statesman about the Haryana social structure; to NPR about the Haryana social structure and how it relates to the rape of Dalit women; to The Indian Express about the political history of Indian cinema; and to Reuters about inheritance rights for women in India. Her 2004 Modern Asian Studies article "Private Lives, State Intervention: Cases of Runaway Marriage in Rural North India" was cited by the Immigration and Refugee Board of Canada in 2006.

She has also written commentary in The Tribune, including about violence related to inter-caste marriages, and advocacy for an investment in the education of girls to reduce poverty.

== Art career ==
Chowdhry is a self-taught artist whose painting are held by the National Gallery, India and the Lalit Kala Akademi, India's National Academy of Fine Arts. She started exhibiting in 1970 and her paintings often reflect on the status of women in India.

== Works ==
=== Books ===
- Chowdhry, Prem (1984). Punjab politics: the role of Sir Chhotu Ram. Vikas/University of Michigan. p. 364. ISBN 978-0706924732.
- Chowdhry, Prem (1994). The Veiled Women: Shifting Gender Equations In Rural Haryana. Oxford University Press India. ISBN 978-0195670387.
- Chowdhry, Prem (2000). Colonial India and the Making of Empire Cinema: Image, Ideology and Identity. Manchester University Press. p. 294. ISBN 978-0719057922.
- Chowdhry, Prem (July 2009). Contentious Marriages, Eloping Couples: Gender, Caste, and Patriarchy in Northern India. Oxford University Press. p. 360. ISBN 978-0198063612.
- Chowdhry, Prem (2010). Gender Discrimination in Land Ownership. Sage Publications. p. 314. ISBN 978-8178299426.
- Chowdhry, Prem (2011). Political Economy of Production and Reproduction. Oxford University Press. p. 464. ISBN 9780198067702.
- Chowdhry, Prem (2011). Understanding Politics And Society – Hardwari Lal. Manak publications. p. 423. ISBN 978-8178312279.

=== Papers ===
- Chowdhry, Prem (28 November 1987). "Socio-economic dimensions of certain customs and attitudes: women of Haryana in the colonial period". Economic and Political Weekly. 22 (48): 2060–2066. JSTOR 4377793.
- Chowdhry, Prem (1990). "Alternative to the Sati model: perceptions of a social reality in folklore". Asian Folklore Studies. 49 (2): 259–274. doi:10.2307/1178036. JSTOR 1178036.
- Chowdhry, Prem (25 December 1993). "High participation, low evaluation: women and work in rural Haryana". Economic and Political Weekly. 28 (52): A–135–A–137 and A–140–A–148. JSTOR 4400591.
- Chowdhry, Prem (1996). "Conjugality, law and state: inheritance rights as pivot of control in Northern India". Indo-British Review. 21 (1): 59–72. OCLC 193906854.
- Chowdhry, Prem (April–June 1996). "Contours of communalism: religion, caste and identity in South-East Punjab". Social Scientist. 24 (4/6): 130–163. doi:10.2307/3517794. JSTOR 3517794.
- Chowdhry, Prem (24 August 1996). "Marriage, sexuality and the female 'ascetic': understanding a Hindu sect". Economic and Political Weekly. 31 (34): 2307–2321. JSTOR 4404549.
- Chowdhry, Prem (10 May 1997). "Enforcing cultural codes: gender and violence in Northern India". Economic and Political Weekly. 32 (19): 1019–1028. JSTOR 4405393.
- Chowdhry, Prem (February 2000). "Propaganda and protest: the myth of the Muslim menace in an empire film (The Drum, 1938)". Studies in History. 16 (1): 109–130. doi:10.1177/025764300001600105. S2CID 159486594.
- Chowdhry, Prem (January–July 2001). "Lustful women, elusive lovers identifying males as objects of female desire". Indian Journal of Gender Studies. 8 (1): 23–50. doi:10.1177/097152150100800102. S2CID 143881077.
- Chowdhry, Prem (3 December 2005). "Crisis of masculinity in Haryana: the unmarried, the unemployed and the aged". Economic and Political Weekly. 40 (49): 5189–5198. JSTOR 4417491.
- Chowdhry, Prem (31 July 2010). "Women in the army". Economic and Political Weekly. 45 (31).

== Personal life ==
She is the daughter of Hardwari Lal, the educationist and Indian National Congress member of parliament for Haryana.
