= Uttara (Mahabharata) =

Character from the Hindu epic Mahabharata

- Mahabharata character
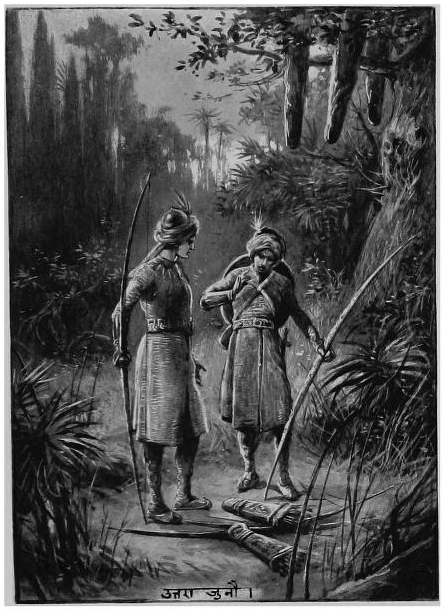
- Uttara and Arjuna discovering the arms

Information
- Title: Prince of Matsya
- Affiliation: Pandavas
- Family: Virata (father); Sudeshna (mother); Shveta (half brother) and Shankha (elder brother); Uttarā (sister)
- Home: Matsya Kingdom

Uttara (Sanskrit: उत्तर, romanized: Uttara), also rendered Uttara Kumara (Sanskrit: उत्तरकुमार, romanized: Uttarakumāra) is a prince of the Matsya Kingdom featured in the Hindu epic Mahabharata. He is the eldest son of King Virata and his wife Sudeshna, at whose court the Pandavas spend their one year of anonymity during their exile. His sister Uttarā marries Abhimanyu, the son of Arjuna.

== Legend ==
=== Mahabharata ===
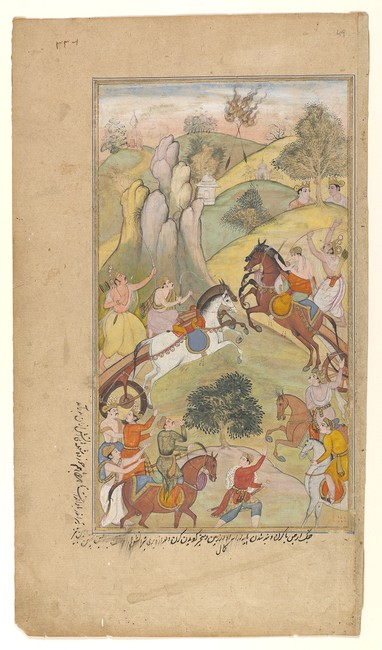
Arjuna Sets Kama's Arrow Alight, folio from the Razmnama (Book of War), 1598–99

Uttara is the son of Virata in Mahabharata. Towards the end of the year that the Pandavas spent at the Matsya Kingdom, Duryodhana, suspecting that the Pandavas were hiding in Matsya kingdom, launched an attack. The army of Hastinapura stood at the borders of Matsya, but King Virata had already taken his entire army to fight the Trigarta army attacking from the south. When news arrived at the palace, Uttara confidently boasted about how he would single-handedly wipe out the Kauravas, underestimating their strength. Upon the prodding of his mother and her maid, he took his sister's dancing teacher, the eunuch Brihannala, who was in reality Arjuna, as his charioteer. As they approached the Kuru army, Uttara panicked at the sight and asked Brihannala to turn back. When he refused, citing Kshatriya dharma, Uttara dismounted the chariot and ran for his life, only for Arjuna to run up to him and catch him. In order to boost Uttara's courage, Arjuna revealed his true identity. Uttara was incredulous and initially refused to believe him; only after Arjuna had recited his ten aliases did Uttara believe that Brihannala was indeed Arjuna in disguise. Arjuna then took charge with Uttara acting as his charioteer, single-handedly defeated the entire Hastinapura army.

==== Kurukshetra War ====
During the 18-day Kurukshetra War, Uttara and his brothers fought in support of the Pandavas. Uttara was killed on the first day of the war by Shalya.

As the battle started, it favoured the Kauravas as their commander-in-chief, Bhishma, was unable to be contained. Going on the attack, Uttara aggressively drove his chariot deep into the Kaurava formation where he was checked by Shalya, who asked Uttara to introduce himself. Uttara boasted about his martial skill and compared himself to Krishna, having been Arjuna's charioteer. Shalya sharply rebuked Uttara for his arrogance, telling him that "his tongue is sharper than his arrows." Uttara responds with a fierce attack. He snapped Shalya's bow, wounds him, killed his charioteer and horses while breaking the wheels of Shalya's chariot. As Shalya fell upon the ground, Uttara aimed the killing blow, mockingly asking Shalya "is this my tongue, or my arrow that will kill you?" From the ground, Shalya hurled a spear through Uttara's body, mortally wounding him. As Uttara collapsed in his chariot, Shalya approached and mourned the death of the young. Uttara's brother, Shveta, who witnessed the ghastly death of his brother, immediately went into a frenzy and started attacking the Kaurava army with hundreds of arrows and inflicted heavy losses on them. Bhishma, unable to contain his rage shot the Brahmastra at Shveta, killing him instantly. Thus the two brothers died on the same day, within minutes of each other.
