= Virata =

Matsya King in the Indian epic Mahabharata

- Mahabharata character
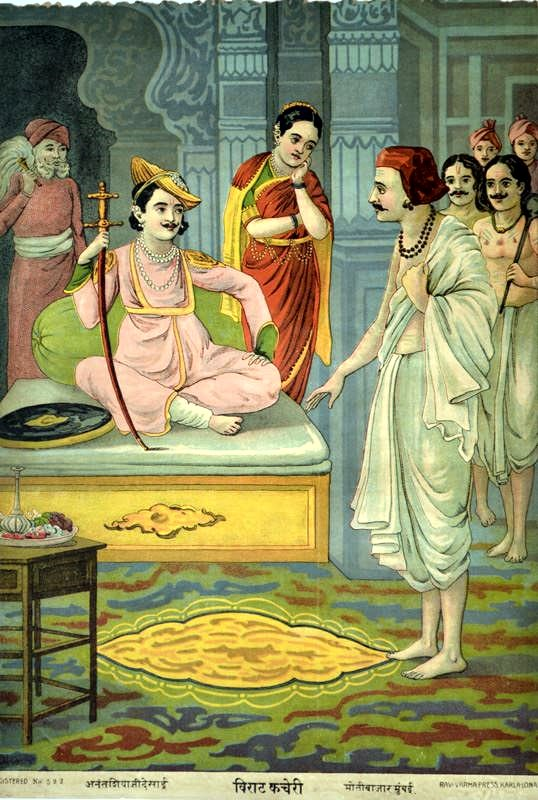
- A lithograph of Virata in his court by Ravi Varma Press, 1920

Information
- Title: King of Matsya
- Family: 10 brothers including Shatanika and Madirashva
- Spouse: Sudeshna (chief queen)
- Children: Shankha, Uttara (sons); Uttarā (daughter)
- Home: Matsya Kingdom

Virata (Sanskrit: विराट, IAST virāṭa) was the King of Matsya, a prominent figure in the Indian epic Mahabharata, and the titular character of the epic's fourth book, Virata Parva, which recounts the Pandavas’ year of ajnatavasa—incognito exile—in his kingdom. He is best known for unknowingly sheltering the Pandavas during this period, with each of them assuming disguised roles in his court. Virata was married to Queen Sudeshna and was the father of Prince Uttara and Princess Uttarā, who married Abhimanyu, the son of Arjuna.

== Literary background ==
The Mahabharata, one of the Sanskrit epics from the Indian subcontinent, other being the Ramayana. It mainly narrates the events and aftermath of the Kurukshetra War, a war of succession between two groups of princely cousins, the Kauravas and the Pandavas. The work is written in Classical Sanskrit and is a composite work of revisions, editing and interpolations over many centuries. The oldest parts in the surviving version of the text may date to near 400 BCE.

The Mahabharata manuscripts exist in numerous versions, wherein the specifics and details of major characters and episodes vary, often significantly. Except for the sections containing the Bhagavad Gita which is remarkably consistent between the numerous manuscripts, the rest of the epic exists in many versions. The differences between the Northern and Southern recensions are particularly significant, with the Southern manuscripts more profuse and longer. Scholars have attempted to construct a critical edition, relying mostly on a study of the "Bombay" edition, the "Poona" edition, the "Calcutta" edition and the "south Indian" editions of the manuscripts. The most accepted version is one prepared by scholars led by Vishnu Sukthankar at the Bhandarkar Oriental Research Institute, preserved at Kyoto University, Cambridge University and various Indian universities.

== Biography ==
=== Family and early life ===
Virata was born into the royal family of the Matsya Kingdom and is described as being born from a portion of the celestial Maruts. He married Sudeshna, the daughter of King Suta of Kekaya. With Sudeshna, Virata had two sons, Shankha and Uttara, and a daughter, Uttarā. Sudeshna's brother, Kichaka, become the commander-in-chief of Matsya army. Virata had ten brothers, most prominent being—Shatanika (also called Suryadatta), who commanded Virata’s army before Kichaka, and Madiraksha (also known as Vishalaksha). The Southern Edition of the Mahabharata adds further details to Virata’s family life, according to which, he also had a first wife, Suratha, a princess of Kosala, with whom he had a son named Shveta. In this version, Virata married Sudeshna after Suratha’s death. Translators of the epic suggest the possibility of Virata having additional wives, as the women's quarters of his palace are described as being populated by numerous women.

In the epic, Virata first appears in the Adi Parva, during the svayamvara of Draupadi, the Panchala princess who later marries the Pandavas. Later, during Sahadeva’s regional conquest before Yudhishthira’s Rajasuya sacrifice, Virata fought against Sahadeva and was defeated. Despite this, Virata remained loyal to the Pandavas and attended Yudhishthira’s Rajasuya ceremony, offering him a gift of 2,000 elephants adorned with gold chains.

=== The year of incognito ===
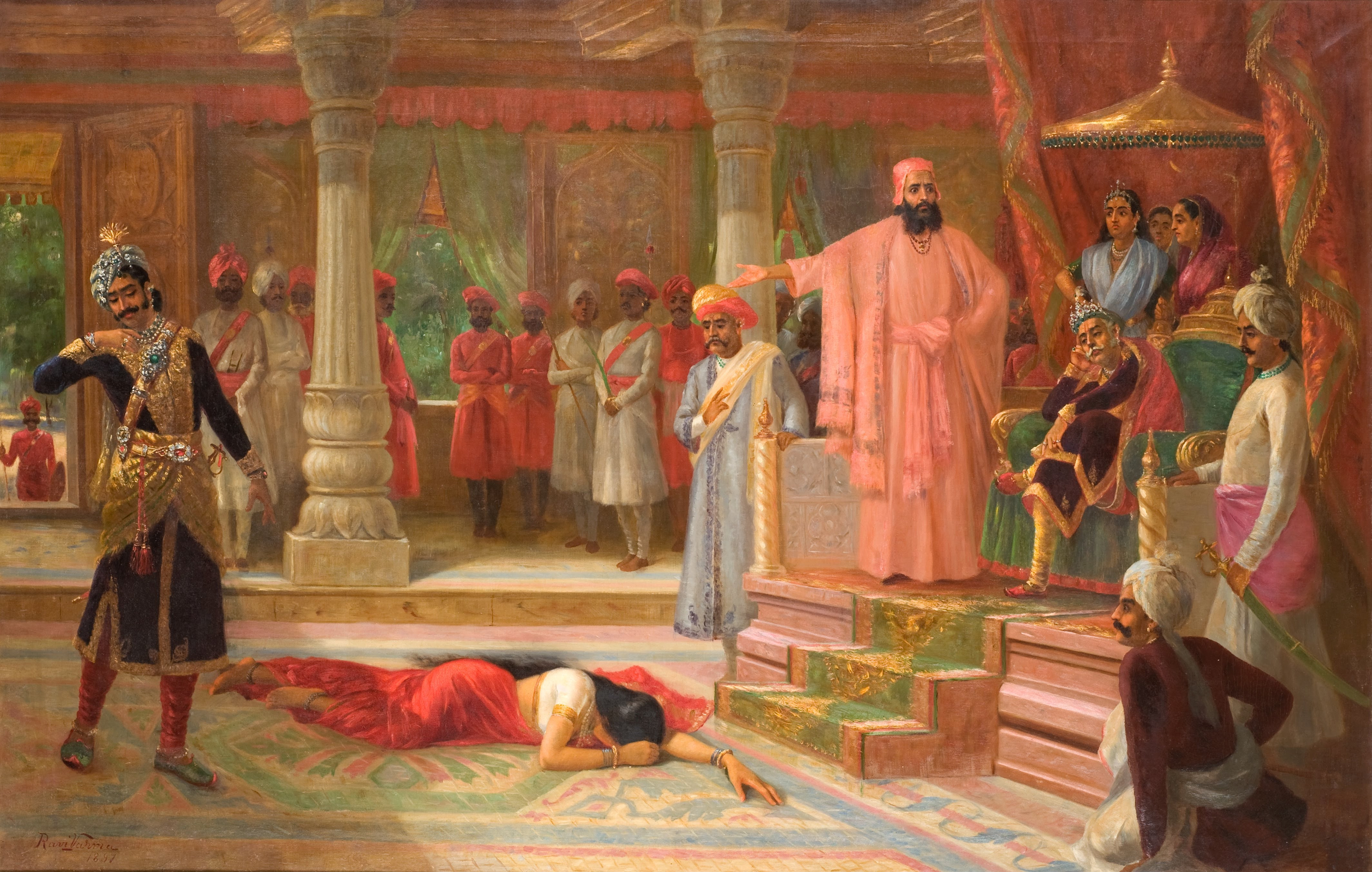
Virata sitting on the throne watching Draupadi’s insult by Kichaka, unable to take an action.

Virata’s most significant role occurs in the Virata Parva, where he unknowingly harbors the Pandavas during their incognito exile, termed as ajnatavasa. Yudhishthira disguised himself as Kanka, Virata’s court companion, while Bhima became the overseer of the royal kitchen. Arjuna, disguised as Brihannala, served as the dance instructor, Nakula worked in the stables, and Sahadeva tended to the king’s cattle. Their shared wife, Draupadi, assumed the role of a Sairandhri (maid) to Queen Sudeshna. Although initially reluctant to accept her, Sudeshna feared that Draupadi's striking beauty might attract King Virata’s attention and lead to infatuation.

Translator J. A. B. van Buitenen notes that Virata is depicted as a somewhat comical and ineffectual figure in the Virata Parva of the Mahabharata. Despite being the monarch, he is shown as gullible, easily influenced, and lacking strong leadership qualities. His kingdom is prosperous, particularly due to its famous cattle wealth, but Virata’s competence as a ruler is often questioned. He is portrayed as a "cattle baron" more interested in his livestock than in statecraft or warfare. His lack of insight allows the disguised Pandavas to infiltrate his court and serve him in various capacities without raising suspicion. The powerful and tyrannical Kichaka effectively controls the palace and wields more authority than the king himself. When Draupadi is publicly assaulted by Kichaka and pleads for justice, Virata does nothing to intervene, demonstrating his inability to stand up to his domineering brother-in-law. Even after Bhima kills Kichaka in a brutal confrontation, Virata is left shaken and apprehensive about the political consequences, worried about reprisals from Kichaka’s powerful allies.

Virata’s military ineptitude becomes apparent during the Trigarta cattle raid in the final month of the year. When the Trigartas, led by King Susharman, attack Matsya following Kichaka's death (who had previously defeated Susharman), Virata recklessly mobilizes his entire army, leaving the city vulnerable. During the battle, he is captured by the Trigartas, but with disguised Bhima's intervention, he is rescued and the Matsya army triumphs. Bhima captures Susharma and brings him to Virata. Virata rewards the Pandavas for saving him, expressing gratitude. Meanwhile, Duryodhana and the Kauravas seize the opportunity to launch a separate attack on Matsya from the north. They raid 60,000 heads of cattle from the kingdom. With no one in Kingdom, prince Uttara, along with Brihannada (Arjuna in disguise) as charioteer, is sent to defend the kingdom. Uttara hesitates, explaining that he lacks experience in combat, leading to Brihannala defeating the entire Kaurava forces.

Upon their return, Virata mistakenly credits his son Uttara with the victory against the Kauravas. Prideful and elated, Virata praises Uttara’s victory, while Yudhisthira credits Brihannada. Angered, Virata throws dices at Yudhisthira, injuring his nose. Uttara arrives, notices Yudhisthira’s injury, and pleads with his father to apologize. Virata regrets his actions, and Yudhisthira forgives him. When Arjuna is summoned, Virata praises Uttara, who clarifies that a "son of a God" (phrased as such to avoid revealing Arjuna's identity) saved them.

Two days later, the Pandavas reveal their true identities in court. Stunned, Virata apologizes to Yudhisthira and offers his daughter, Uttarā, in marriage to Arjuna. Arjuna, treating her as a daughter, proposes she marry his son Abhimanyu instead, and Virata agrees, sealing the alliance. The marriage of Abhimanyu and Uttarā was conducted in the city of Upaplavya in Matsya Kingdom. The city later became a primary hub for Pandavas' alliance for preparation of the Kurukshetra War.

=== Kurukshetra War and death ===
Virata played a key role during the Kurukshetra War. He was appointed as one of the seven commanders of Yudhishthira’s army. Sahadeva preferred Virata to be the commander-in-chief of their army, but Yudhishthira and Arjuna preferred Dhrishtadyumna, and Virata's nomination was outvoted. On the first day of the war, he fought against Bhagadatta and later attacked Bhishma himself. He also clashed with several prominent warriors, including Ashwatthama, Jayadratha, Vinda and Anuvinda, and Shalya. In a battle with Drona, Virata’s son Shankha was killed, prompting Virata to flee the battlefield. During another encounter with Shalya, Virata was rendered unconscious, and he was ultimately killed by Drona.

After Virata’s death, his funeral was conducted with full honors, and Yudhishthira performed offerings to his spirit. According to the Svargarohana Parva, Virata ascended to heaven after his death and rejoined the Maruts.

== See also ==
- Matsya Kingdom
- Virata Kingdom
