= Vishnu Sitaram Sukthankar =

Indian Sanskrit scholar (1887–1943)

Vishnu Sitaram Sukthankar, also known as V. S. Sukthankar (4 May 1887 – 21 January 1943), was an Indologist and scholar of Sanskrit. He is principally known as the General Editor of the Critical Edition of the Mahabharata published by the Bhandarkar Oriental Research Institute in Pune, India.

== Early life and education ==
Vishnu Sitaram Sukthankar was born in Bombay (now Mumbai) on 4 May 1887 to Sitaram Sukthankar, his father, a civil engineer, and Dhaklibai, his mother. His grandfather, Shantaram Narayan, was a government pleader.

Sukthankar was educated at the Maratha High School and later at St. Xavier's College, Bombay. After passing his Intermediate Examination, he left for England and studied mathematics during the years 1903–1906 at St. John's College, Cambridge and passing his Mathematical Tripos. In 1909, he studied at the University of Edinburgh.

Meanwhile, his interests had turned to Indology. He completed a doctorate between 1911 and 1914 at the Humboldt University in Berlin under the supervision of Heinrich Lüders. He was also a student of Hermann Jacobi. The subject of his thesis was the grammar of Shakatayana, together with the commentary of Yaksavarman. The outbreak of the First World War forced him to leave Germany, and he was formally awarded his degree only in 1921.

== Career ==
In 1915, having returned to India, Sukthankar took up the post of Assistant Superintendent of the Western Circle in the Archaeological Survey of India. In 1919, he returned to Britain, and re-joined his family.

In the years 1919–21, Sukthankar and his young family lived in New York. In 1920, he lectured at the annual convention of the American Oriental Society. During the early 1920s, he wrote a series of papers on the plays (presumptively) by Bhasa, and moreover published a translation of his 'Svapnavasavadatta'. This material, together with Sukthankar's papers on epigraphy have been posthumously collected in the 2nd volume of the 'Sukthankar Memorial Edition'.

In 1925, Sukthankar assumed the General Editorship of the Critical Edition of the Mahabharata at the Bhandarkar Oriental Research Institute in Pune. After years of tireless labour and the assistance of several copyists and fellow scholars, the first fascicule of the Adi Parva (i.e., first of the eighteen Books of the Mahabharata) was published in 1927, followed by the entire Adi Parva in 1933. The work involved collating about 60 partial manuscripts of the Mahabharata in ten different scripts belonging to two major recensions (Northern and Southern). A lucid and detailed account of his methods of Textual Criticism may be found in the `Prolegomena' to the 1933 volume. Some of his writings on the Mahabharata have been collected in the first volume of the 'Sukthankar Memorial Edition'.

The subsequent Parvans were edited on the basis of his framework by a legion of scholars at the Bhandarkar Institute during his tenure and after his death, and the publication of the entire Critical Edition was finally complete in 1966. This work has proved to be immensely valuable for all subsequent scholarship on the Mahabharata. An English translation of the Critical Edition was undertaken by J. A. B. van Buitenen, who completed five of the Parvans before his death. This work is now being carried forward by other scholars.

Sukthankar's principles of textual criticism were also put to use towards the Critical Edition of the Ramayana, prepared during the years 1951-1975 by the Oriental Institute at the Maharaja Sayajirao University of Baroda.

In January 1943, Sukthankar was invited to deliver a series of four lectures on the Mahabharata at the University of Bombay. However, on the eve of the fourth and final lecture, he died suddenly due to complications arising from a cerebral thrombosis. The lectures were later published as a book.

Contemporary accounts describe him as an aloof and reticent scholar, whose early mathematical training had led him to an insistence on precision in his philological studies.

== Personal life ==
He married Eleanor Bowing (1889–1927) on 29 July 1908. Together they had children named John (1908), Kathleen (1912) and Maurice (1913), and Lalnath (1923).
