= Yajnaseni (disambiguation) =

Yajnaseni is another name for Draupadi in the Sanskrit epic Mahabharat.

Yajnaseni may also refer to:

- Yajnaseni (play), 2016 Nepali-language play by Suman Pokhrel
- Yajnaseni (novel), 1984 Odia-language novel by Pratibha Ray

== See also ==
- Yagam (disambiguation)
