= Amrita Keerti Puraskar =

Amrita Keerti Puraskar (Award) has been given each year since 2001 by the Mata Amritanandamayi Math to people who have made significant contributions to Indian Culture and the Vedic tradition. This accolade includes a monetary prize of Rs. 123,456, an idol of Saraswati Devi crafted by the artist Karuvattu Mana Vasudevan Namboothiri and a certificate of commendation from the Mata Amritanandamayi Math. The presentation ceremony takes place annually on Mata Amritanandamayi's birthday.

== Winners ==
| SL. No. | Year | Recipient |
|---|---|---|
| 1 | 2001 | Acharya Narendra Bhooshan |
| 2 | 2002 | P. Parameswaran |
| 3 | 2003 | Dr. Shankar Abhyankar and Prof. Harihara Shastri |
| 4 | 2004 | Akkitham Achuthan Namboothiri |
| 5 | 2005 | P. Narayana Kurup |
| 6 | 2006 | Pratibha Ray |
| 7 | 2007 | Paravoor Sreedharan Thanthrikal |
| 8 | 2008 | Prof. R. Vasudevan Potti |
| 9 | 2009 | Prof. K.V. Dev |
| 10 | 2010 | Prof. N.P. Unni |
| 11 | 2011 | M. P. Veerendra Kumar |
| 12 | 2012 | C. Radhakrishnan |
| 13 | 2013 | Manoj Das and Thuravoor Viswambharan |
| 14 | 2014 | S. Ramesan Nair |
| 15 | 2015 | Muthukulam Sridhar |
| 16 | 2016 | Ambalapuzha Gopakumar |
| 17 | 2017 | Dr. M. Lakshmi Kumari |
| 18 | 2018 | K. B. Sreedevi |
| 19 | 2019 | Vattaparambil Gopinathan Pillai |
| 20 | 2020 | S. L. Bhyrappa |
| 21 | 2021 | Acharyasri Rajesh |
| 22 | 2022 | Srivaraham Chandrasekharan |
| 23 | 2023 | K. S. Radhakrishnan |
