= Chathurveda Samhitha =

The Chathurveda Samhitha (Sanskrit: चतुर्वेदसंहिता, Malayalam: ചതുര് വേദസംഹിത) is a set of the four books making up the Chatur Veda Samhita, a compilation of all four Veda Mantras with many detailed studies in Malayalam.

== Etymology ==
Chathurveda Samhitha is made of three words – "Chathur", "Veda" and "Samhitha". "Chathur" meaning four, "Veda" meaning knowledge and "Samhitha" meaning collection. The detailed meaning of this word is "collection of Veda Mantras".

== Vedas ==
The four Vedas are Rig Veda, Yajur Veda, Sama Veda and Atharva Veda. They consist of hymns called Mantras which contain all knowledge in "seed" form (Bheeja roopa). They are among the oldest known works of literature, originally passed down via the oral tradition. Many scholars like Maharishi Dayananda Saraswati state that the Vedas originated at the beginning of this cycle of creation 1.97 billion (197 crore) years before, as per Soorya Sidhantha derived from Atharva Veda.

=== General belief ===
It is popularly believed (by scholars like Shankara) that Vedas consists of four parts:

1. Mantras or Mantra Samhithas
2. Brahmanas
3. Aranyakas
4. Upanishads

=== Reality about Vedas ===
Vedas consists of Mantra Samhithas only, which believed to be Apourusheya (Sanskrit: अपौरुषेय) – not of human origin but divine creation. Brahmanas and Aranyakas are basically the same and Upanishads are written by sages (ancient scholars) as interpretation of Vedas.

=== Popular misconceptions about the contents of Vedas ===
1. Vedas are written by Humans (Rishis), not of divine origin .
2. It is commonly believed that Vedas are three in number, not four. Many consider only Rig Veda, Yajur Veda and Sama Veda as Vedas. Atharva Veda is said to have originated recently and is not part of Vedas.
3. Vedas contain fearful begging by cowherd/shepherds to please the fierce natural forces.
4. Vedas permit meat eating.
5. Vedas mention about multitude of Gods.

=== About this book ===
The first time all four Veda Mantra Samhitas were printed with Swara-Sthana (punctuation for pronunciation) in Malayalam alphabets was the magum opus work of Narendra Bhooshan along with various studies on Vedic subjects.

The language of the Vedas is Vedic Sanskrit (1400 BCE − 300 BCE) which uses special characters to give proper pronunciation.

== Volumes ==
The book is compiled in 4 volumes, each of 1008 pages.

=== Volume 1 ===
- Vedaadyanthangal (Beginning and ends of Vedas)
- Chatur Veda Paryatanam – a journey through 4 Vedas
- Rigvedadi Bashya Bhoomika
- Vedadhikara Niroopanam
- Vaidika Swara Shaashtram
- Vaidika Yagaswaroopam
- Vaidika Vangmayathinte Rooparekha

=== Volume 2 ===
- Rigvedapadanam
- Rigveda Samhita (Devanagari lipi with Swaras marked and Malayalam script)
- Rishi, Devata, Chandhass, Swaraanukramanika in Rigveda
- Mantraanukramanika
- Devata concepts in Rigveda – a study

=== Volume 3 ===
- Yajurvedapadanam
- Yajurveda Samhita (Devanagari lipi with Swaras marked and Malayalam script)
- Rishi, Devata, Chandhass, Swaraanukramanika in Yajurveda
- Devata concepts in Yajurveda
- Samavedapadanam
- Samaveda Samhita (Devanagari lipi with Swaras marked and Malayalam script)
- Rishi, Devata, Chandhass, Swaraanukramanika in Samaveda
- Devata concepts in Samaveda

=== Volume 4 ===
- Atharvavedapadanam
- Atharvaveda Samhita (Devanagari lipi with Swaras marked and Malayalam script)
- Rishi, Devata, Chandhass, Swaraanukramanika in Atharvaveda
- Selected Sooktas with meaning
- Mantraanukramanika
