= Yagam (disambiguation) =

Yagam is an alternate name for yajna, a Hindu ritual of sacrifice. It may also refer to:

- Yagam (1982 film), a Malayalam-language film
- Yagam (2010 film), a Telugu-language film

== See also ==
- Jashn (disambiguation)
- Yajnaseni (disambiguation)
- Yagnam (1991 film), 1991 Indian film
- Yagnam (2004 film), 2004 Indian film
