= Ambalapuzha Gopakumar =

Indian writer and poet (1944–2024)

Gopakumar, Ambalapuzha
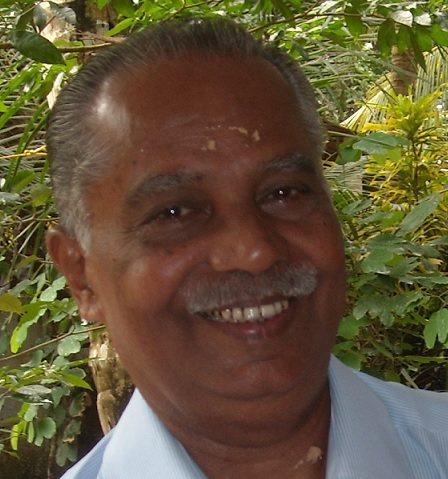
- Born: 27 June 1944; Ambalapuzha, Travancore, India
- Died: 21 July 2024 (aged 80); Ambalapuzha, Kerala, India
- Citizenship: India
- Education: Ph.D.
- Alma mater: Sanathana Dharma College, Alappuzha; NSS Hindu College, Changanassery
- Occupations: Poet, Historian, Professor
- Notable work: Rappadi, Shyamakrishnan, Idayante Pattu, History of Ambalapuzha Temple, Kunchan Nambiar,
- Title

Thathamathu Nanupilla Gopakumaran Nair (27 June 1944 – 21 July 2024) was an Indian Malayalam poet, historian, orator and writer from Kerala. He was the recipient of the Kerala State Institute of Children's Literature Award, in 2012. Gopakumar was also the author of 'History of Ambalapuzha Sree Krishna Temple' which describes the origin and history of Amabalapuzha and the famous Sreekrishna Temple. He was widely regarded as an authority on the history of Chemapakassery, the erstwhile name of Ambalapuzha.

Gopakumar was the director of the Vaikom Kshetra Kalapeedom. In August 2016, he was given the 'Janmashtami' award for literature. He was also the recipient of Amrita Keerti Puraskar in 2016, in recognition of his contributions to spiritual, philosophical, and cultural literature.

== Biography ==
Ambalapuzha Gopakumar was born to Thathamathu C K Nanupilla and K. M. Rajamma, on 27 June 1944 at Ambalapuzha, Alappuzha in Kerala. He lost his father when he was nine. His childhood days were spent in Ambalapuzha where he attended the public 'Government Model High School, Ambalapuzha'.

Gopakumar was a professor at Sanatana Dharma College and retired as the Head of the Malayalam Department in 1999. He was a member of the advisory board of the Human Rights Protection Mission and a director board member of Samastha Kerala Sahitya Parishath. He died on 21 July 2024, at the age of 80.

== Writings ==
Gopakumar's first published work was Udayathinu Munmpu, which the National Book Stall published. His poems have appeared in all leading literary magazines in Malayalam. His published works also include essays, biographies, and a history of ancient art forms of Chempakassery.

=== Poetic works ===
- Udayathinu Mumpu
- Idayante Patu
- shyamakrishnan
- Manyamahajanam
- Amruthapuriyile Kattu
- Amruthadarshanam
- Harimadhavam
- Gangamayya
- Poliye Poli
- Sreekrishnaleela
- Akuthikuthu
- Rappadi

=== Prose list ===
- Ambalapuzha Kshethra Charithram
- Sukrutha Paithrukam
- Thirakal Maykatha Padamudrakal
- Ambalapuzha Sahodaranmar
- Sathyathinte Nanarthangal
- Velakali
- Charithra Padhathile Nakshatra Vilakku
- Ente Ullile Kadal
- Kairaliyude Varadanagal
- Ente Ullile Kadal (found and published Thakazhi's unknown work)
- Leelankanam (found and published changampuzha's unknown work)

== Awards ==
- 2011 – Prof. Kozhisseril Balaraman Award for Literature
- 2012 – Kerala State Institute of Children's Literature award
- 2012 – Narayaneeyam Puraskaram for contributions to the spiritual domain
- 2014 – Ekatha Award for Literature, Sharja
- 2015 – Vasudeva Puraskaram from Ambalapuzha Temple
- 2015 – Venmani Award for Literature
- 2015 – Karuvatta Chandran Memorial Award for Literature
- 2016 – Janmashtami Award
- 2016 – Amritakeerthy Puraskar

== Positions held ==
- Prof. and the head of the Dept. of Malayalam, S. D. College
- Ph.D. Board member, University of Kerala
- Director board member, Samastha Kerala Sahitya Parishath
- President, P. K. Memorial Library, Ambalapuzha
- President, Ambalapuzha Temple Advisory Committee
- Secretary, Kunchan Nambiar Memorial, Ambalapuzha
- Chief editor, Sreevatsam
- Administrator, Jawahar Balabhavan, Alappuzha
