= Draupadi =

Heroine of the ancient Hindu epic Mahabharata

- Member of Panchakanya
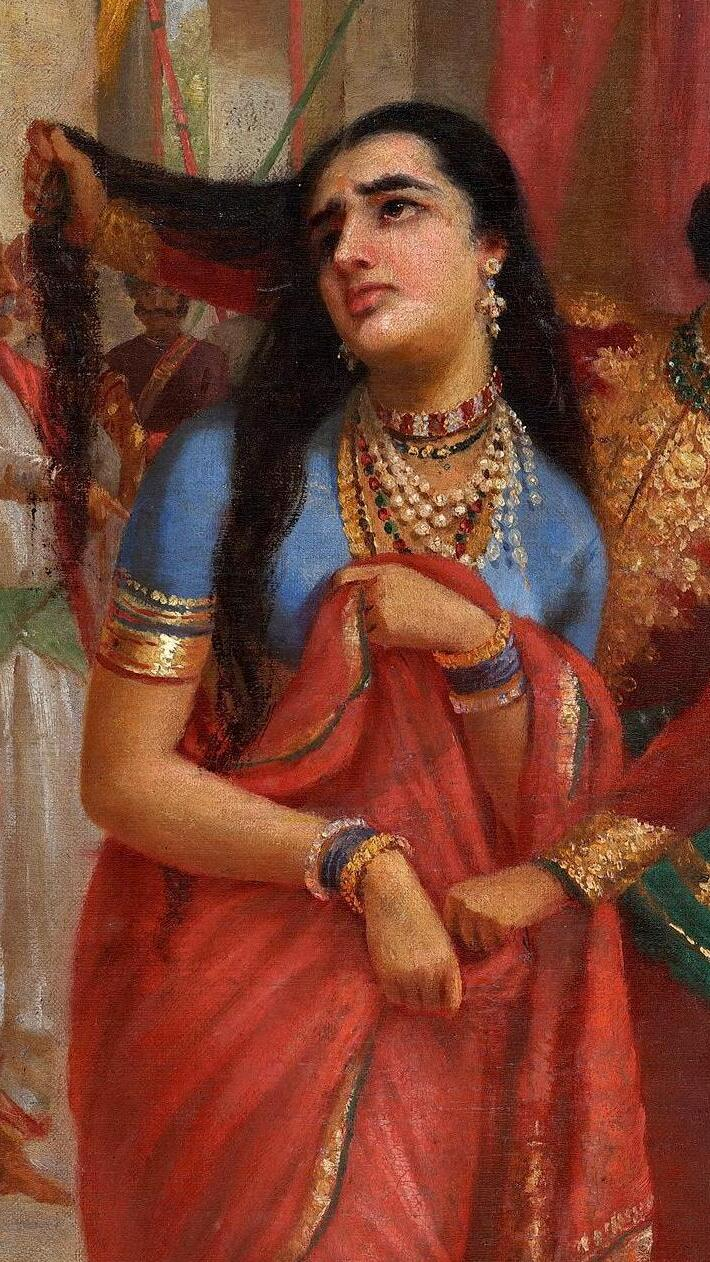
- Depiction of Draupadi in the Kuru court by Raja Ravi Varma, c. 1888-90
- Other names: Krishnā; Yajnaseni; Panchali
- Devanagari: द्रौपदी
- Affiliation: Panchakanya; Shri; Devi
- Texts: Mahabharata; Puranas
- Gender: Female

Genealogy
- Born: Panchala
- Died: Himalayas
- Parents: Drupada (father); Prishati (mother)
- Siblings: Dhristadyumna (twin-brother); Shikhandi and other children of Drupada
- Spouse: Pandavas: Yudhishthira; Bhima; Arjuna; Nakula; Sahadeva
- Children: Draupadeyas: Prativindhya by Yudhishthira; Sutasoma by Bhima; Shrutakarma by Arjuna; Shatanika by Nakula; Shrutasena by Sahadeva
- Dynasty: Kuru dynasty by marriage Somaka dynasty by birth

Draupadi (Sanskrit: द्रौपदी, romanized: draupadī, lit. 'Daughter of Drupada'), also referred to as Krishnā, Panchali and Yajnaseni, is one of the central characters of the ancient Sanskrit epic, the Mahabharata (c. 400 BCE – 400 CE). She is the princess of the Panchala Kingdom, described being born fully grown from a yajna (fire sacrifice) conducted by King Drupada. Sanctioned by divine prophecy and narratives of her previous lives, she becomes the common wife of the five Pandava brothers—Yudhishthira, Bhima, Arjuna, Nakula, and Sahadeva—in a polyandrous marriage. Attested as a partial incarnation of the goddess Shri, Draupadi initially serves as the queen of Indraprastha, overseeing the kingdom's finances and treasury. She is also described as a sakhi (close friend) of the god Krishna.

The most notable episode featuring Draupadi takes place during the game of dice at the Kuru court. In this game, Yudhishthira, having lost Indraprastha and his freedom, wagers and loses Draupadi to his cousin Duryodhana—the leader of the Kauravas. She is forcibly dragged into the royal assembly and deemed a slave. However, she challenges the assembly, questioning the legality of being staked after one of her husbands had already forfeited his own freedom. After she is publicly humiliated by Duryodhana and his ally Karna for being married to five men, the Kaurava prince Dushasana attempts to disrobe her, but her honour is miraculously preserved, as her garment becomes endlessly extended. The Kuru king Dhritarashtra then intervenes and grants Draupadi two boons, resulting in the release of the Pandavas from bondage.

Afterwards, Draupadi accompanies the Pandavas into their thirteen-year exile after they lose their kingdom to the Kauravas. In the final year of exile, Draupadi lives incognito, disguised as a maid to Queen Sudeshna of Matsya. When she is harassed by the Matsya general Kichaka, she successfully persuades Bhima to kill Kichaka. After the exile, when Duryodhana refuses to restore the Pandavas' kingdom, Draupadi strongly supports the call for the Kurukshetra War, recalling the humiliations and assaults she had suffered and demanding punishment for her culprits. Although the Kauravas are slain, the war also leads to the deaths of her father, brothers, and her five sons. These sons—each born to one of the Pandavas—are collectively known by the matronymic Draupadeyas. After the Pandavas' victory, she becomes the empress of the Kuru Kingdom for thirty-six years. In the epic's conclusion, Draupadi joins the Pandavas on their final journey toward heaven, during which she is the first to fall.

Draupadi is a significant figure in Hindu and Indian culture, particularly noted for her beauty, courage, devotion, intelligence, resilience and rhetorical skills. She is also extolled as one of the panchakanya (five virgins), archetypes of female chastity whose names are believed to dispel sin when recited. Mediaeval classical literature, such as the 8th-century play Venisamhara, introduces several new narratives centred on Draupadi, including her vows of untied hair and to wash her hair with Dushasana's blood as a symbol of revenge. In some parts of the sub-continent, a sect of Draupadi exists, where she is worshipped as a goddess. Her story has been an inspiration for various arts, performances and secondary literature.

== Literary background and appearance ==
The story of Draupadi is told in the Indian script Mahabharata, one of the Sanskrit epics from the Indian subcontinent. The work is written in Classical Sanskrit and is a composite work of revisions, editing and interpolations over many centuries. The oldest parts in the surviving version of the text probably date to about 400 BCE. The Mahabharata manuscripts exist in numerous versions, wherein the specifics and details of major characters and episodes vary, often significantly. Except for the sections containing the Bhagavad Gita which is remarkably consistent between the numerous manuscripts, the rest of the epic exists in many versions. The differences between the Northern and Southern recensions are particularly significant, with the Southern manuscripts more profuse and longer. Scholars have attempted to construct a critical edition, relying mostly on a study of the "Bombay" edition, the "Poona" edition, the "Calcutta" edition and the "south Indian" editions of the manuscripts. The most accepted version is one prepared by scholars led by Vishnu Sukthankar at the Bhandarkar Oriental Research Institute, preserved at Kyoto University, Cambridge University and various Indian universities.

Within the epic, Draupadi's very first mention is in the first book, the Adi Parva, specifically at I.1.106. In this initial mention, which is within the dirge of the Kuru King Dhritrashtra, who is also her uncle-in-law, Draupadi is described as having her throat full of tears, led to the royal assembly, distressed, wearing a single cloth, menstruating, and like someone without a protector. Her next mention occurs within the same dirge where she is marked as 'a woman of grief' for losing her five sons. Scholar Kevin McGrath notes that these initial mentions signals her presence in the narrative long before she actually appears in person, which happens in I.155, and picture her entry into the epic with outrage and grief.

=== Physical appearance ===
In her first physical appearance in the story, which happens during Drupada's yajna in the Adi Parva CE I.155.43, as she arises from the altar, an exceedingly flattering description of Draupadi's physical appearance is included:

"The fire-born woman was extremely beautiful. Her eyes were black and large as lotus-petals, her complexion was dark, and her locks were blue and curly. Her nails were beautifully convex and bright as burnished copper; her eyebrows were fair, and her breasts were deep. Indeed, she resembled the veritable daughter of a celestial born among men. Her body gave out fragrance like that of a blue lotus, perceivable from a distance of full two miles. Her beauty was such that she had no equal on earth. Like a celestial herself, she could be desired (in marriage) by a celestial, a Danava, or a Yaksha".

Next major physical description is found in five long shlokas in the second Book, Sabha Parva, where Yudhishthira describes her beauty and character while staking her during the dice game:

..."She is not too short or too tall, not too black or too red, and her eyes are red with love...Eyes like the petals of autumn lotuses, a fragrance as of autumn lotuses, a beauty that waits on autumn lotuses-the peer of the Goddess of Fortune [Shri]! Yes, for her lack of cruelty, for the fullness of her body, for the straightness of her character does a man desire a woman. Last she lies down who was the first to wake up, who knows what was done or left undone, down to the cowherds and goatherds. Her sweaty lotus-like face shines like a lotus. Her waist shaped like an altar, hair long, eyes the color of copper, not too much body hair such is the woman, king, such is the slender-waisted Panchali"...

Draupadi’s extraordinary divine beauty is a recurring feature of her appearance in the epic, often presented alongside her unmistakable royal bearing. This is particularly evident in several episodes, including: when Jayadratha first encounters her in the Vana Parva, he mistakes her for a celestial being; Yudhishthira remarks that her regal appearance would make it difficult for her to remain disguised; and Queen Sudeshna, when Draupadi approaches her seeking employment, initially refuses to believe that she could be an ordinary maid and repeatedly questions whether she is some kind of celestial woman. Draupadi is also repeatedly compared with the goddess Shri, of whom she is established being a partial incarnation.

== Etymology and epithets ==
The word Draupadī (lit. 'daughter of Drupada') is a patronymic, derived from the word Drupada, which means 'pillar'. Like other epic characters, she is referred to by multiple names in the Mahabharata. Some of her other names and epithets are as follows:

- Kṛṣṇā– 'one who has a dark complexion'. It is the birth name of Draupadi.
- Pāñcālī – 'one from Panchala'.
- Yajñasenī – another patronymic derived from Drupada's another name Yajnasena (lit. 'he whose army is sacrificial'); or the name can also mean 'one born from a Yajña (sacrificial fire)'.
- Parṣatī – 'granddaughter of Prishata', or 'daughter of Prishati'. Both the names—Parshati and Prishati—are derived from Prishata, Drupada's father.
- Yaśasvinī – 'one who possesses glory'.
- Rājaputrī – 'princess'.
- Satyavratā – virtuous.
- Vīrapatnī – 'wife of heroes'.
- Saputrā – 'mother of sons'.
- Manasvinī – 'esteemed'.
- Pancavallabhā – 'Beloved of the five Pandavas'.
- Pāṇḍuśarmilā – 'Daughter-in-law of Pandu'.
- Mālinī – the garlanded one'. This was the pseudonym assumed by Draupadi during her incognito life in Matsya Kingdom
- Sairandhrī – a term referring to Draupadi's profession as an attendant to queen during her incognito.

== Biography ==
=== Birth ===
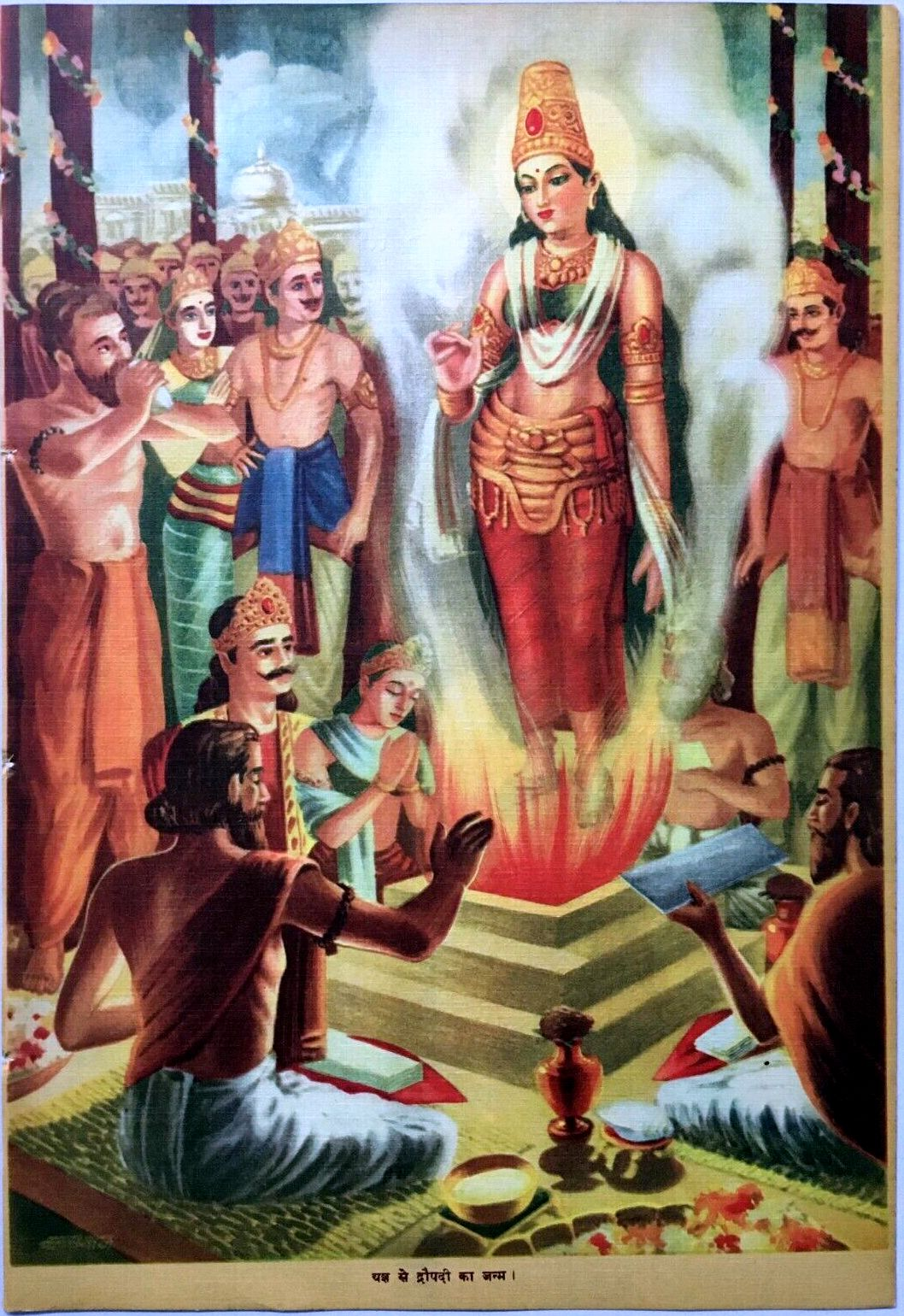
A 1940s print depicting the birth of Draupadi from the fire sacrifice

Draupadi is not born of a woman and thus, she is often described as an ayonija (lit. 'one not born from a woman's womb'). Her birth is narrated in the Adi Parva of the epic. Drona—the teacher of the Kuru princes—defeats his former friend Drupada with the help of his student Arjuna and seizes half of Panchala. Seeking vengeance, Drupada realises that none of his sons or allies is capable of slaying Drona. As a result, he decides to perform a yajna (fire-sacrifice) to obtain a powerful son. He approaches the sage Upayaja, who initially refuses to conduct the rite, as it departs from the auspicious śrauta (Vedic) tradition and draws instead on non-śrauta practices.

The ritual partakes of the nature of abhichara (black magic)—a death-dealing form of sacrifice—which Upayaja disapproves of. However, Drupada eventually wins over his elder brother, Yaja. With the sages Yaja and Upayaja serving as the chief priests, the yajna is conducted. After its completion, the priests instruct Prishati—Drupada's queen—to consume the sacrificial offering in order to conceive, but she refuses and asks them to wait until she has bathed and put on perfume. Unable to wait, Yaja pours the offering into the altar of the sacrifice. From the flames first emerges a youthful man, prophesied to slay Drona and fulfil Drupada's vengeance. Following him, Draupadi—as a fully grown youthful maiden—arises from the vedi (altar), who, unlike her brother, is not born to fulfil Drupada's task, but that of the gods.

Draupadi's birth, too, is accompanied by a divine prophecy, which declares that she would be the foremost among all women and would become the cause of the destruction of many Kshatriyas. The twins are named Dhrishtadyumna and Krishnaa, respectively, by the chief priests, and Prishati proclaims that they should be considered her children. The twins accept both Drupada and Prishati as their parents, and Krishnaa is bestowed with the patronymic Draupadi.

=== Education ===
Draupadi is specifically referred to as a paṇḍitā, a term denoting scholarly or intellectual calibre, reflecting her aristocratic upbringing and formal education. Draupadi herself alludes to the wisdom she absorbed in her father Drupada’s court, where she used to sit on his lap and learn from the brahmanas who instructed her brothers; she participated in these lessons and became an expert in political science. This intellectual foundation not only elevated her status within the household but also endowed her with considerable rhetorical skill. Yudhishthira explicitly praises Draupadi's oratorical ability (3.32.1ab), recognising her as an adept speaker capable of stirring emotion through vivid recollections, reinforcing arguments with authoritative references to itihasa and purana (ancient lore), and demonstrating logical acumen through independently reasoned conclusions on dharma. Such rhetorical strength made her a compelling figure in moments of counsel and crisis.

=== Svayamvara ===
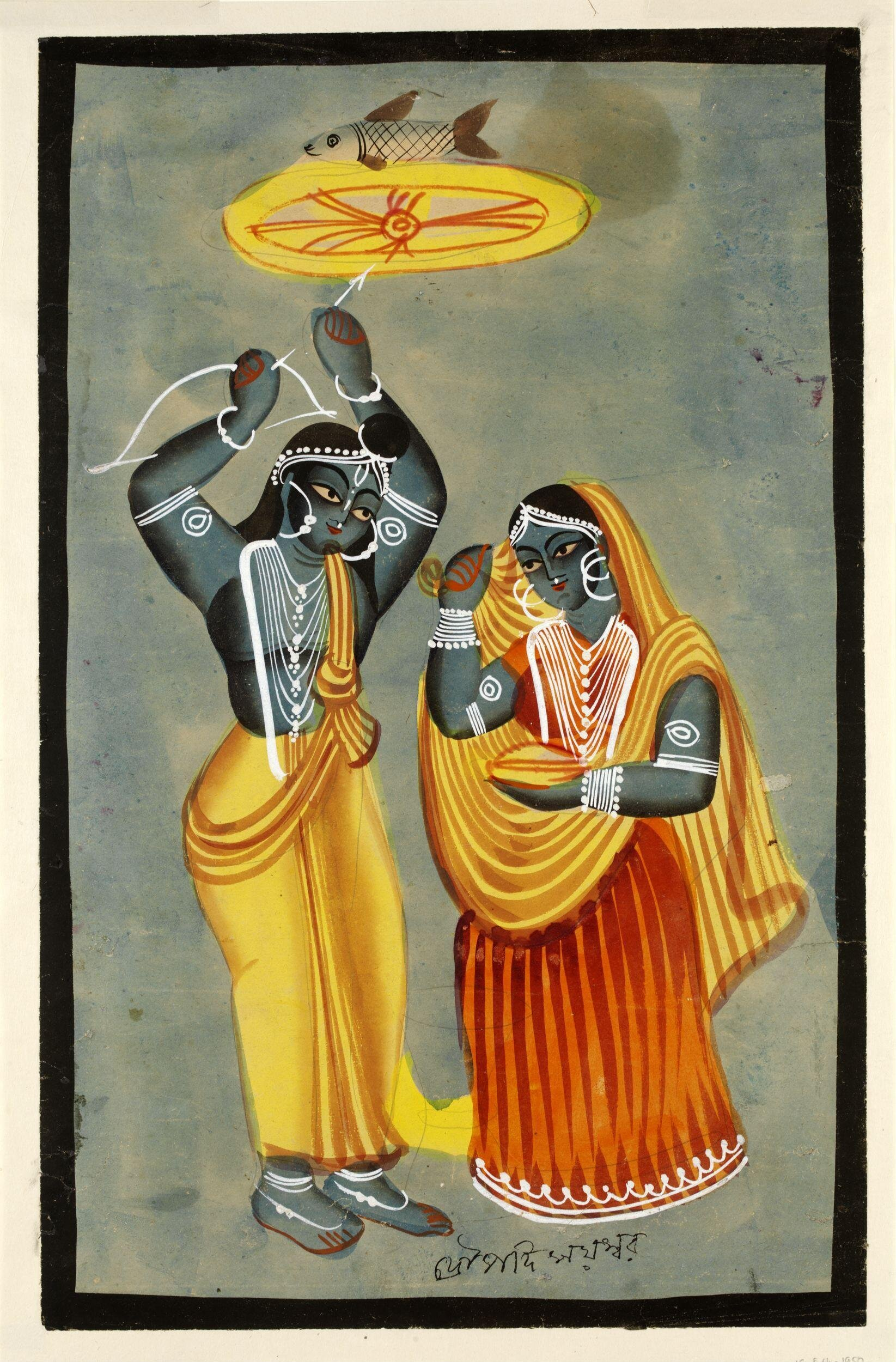
A scene from Draupadi's Svayamvara: Draupadi looks on as Arjuna aims at the eye of the fish, Kalighat painting.

The Adi Parva narrates that Drupada intends to wed Draupadi to Arjuna, one of the five Pandava brothers who had previously defeated him in battle, earning Drupada's admiration. Upon hearing of the Pandavas' supposed death at Varnavata, he arranges a svayamvara contest for Draupadi to choose her husband through a competitive trial. Drupada, believing that the Pandavas are alive and hoping to attract Arjuna, has a powerful bow specially crafted for the contest. The contest is to lift and string a great bow and shoot an arrow to pierce the eye of a golden fish—relying only on its reflection in the water below. The news of Draupadi's svayamvara spreads far and wide. Numerous kings and princes, along with large numbers of commoners and brahmanas, begin making their way to Panchala. Around the same time, the Pandavas, accompanied by their mother Kunti, also set out for Panchala. On their way, they encounter a large group of brahmanas heading to the svayamvara, who invite them to join the journey.

At the svayamvara contest, Dhrishtadyumna performs the fire ritual and announces the terms of the challenge. He then presents the assembled barons to Draupadi. It is stated that all the barons, as well as all the Pandavas, seated among the Brahmins, become infatuated with Draupadi the moment they see her. Nearly all the assembled monarchs fail to complete the challenge. There are variations concerning Karna’s participation: in some Northern Recensions, Draupadi exercises her autonomy and refuses to marry Karna on the grounds that he is a suta (a caste lower than the Kshatriya), which seeds a hatred for her in Karna that later manifests during the dice game; in most others, including the Critical Edition, Draupadi raises no such objection—Karna simply attempts the trial but fails to string the bow by the breadth of a hair. (Note: According to the critical edition of the Mahabharata from the Bhandarkar Oriental Research Institute, this incident of insulting or denial of Karna is an interpolation since this event is not available in the entire Kumbakonam version of the Mahabharata (the southern text of the Mahabharata), Sharada and Bengali manuscripts. He failed to string the legendary bow.)

In the end, Arjuna successfully performs the task, shooting five arrows to strike the target. Draupadi garlands him, marking him as her chosen husband. As Arjuna leads her away, the assembled kings react with indignation, feeling insulted that a Brahmin has won the contest. They rise in opposition, but Bhima and Arjuna confront them and the barons eventually disperse.

=== Polyandry and previous lives ===
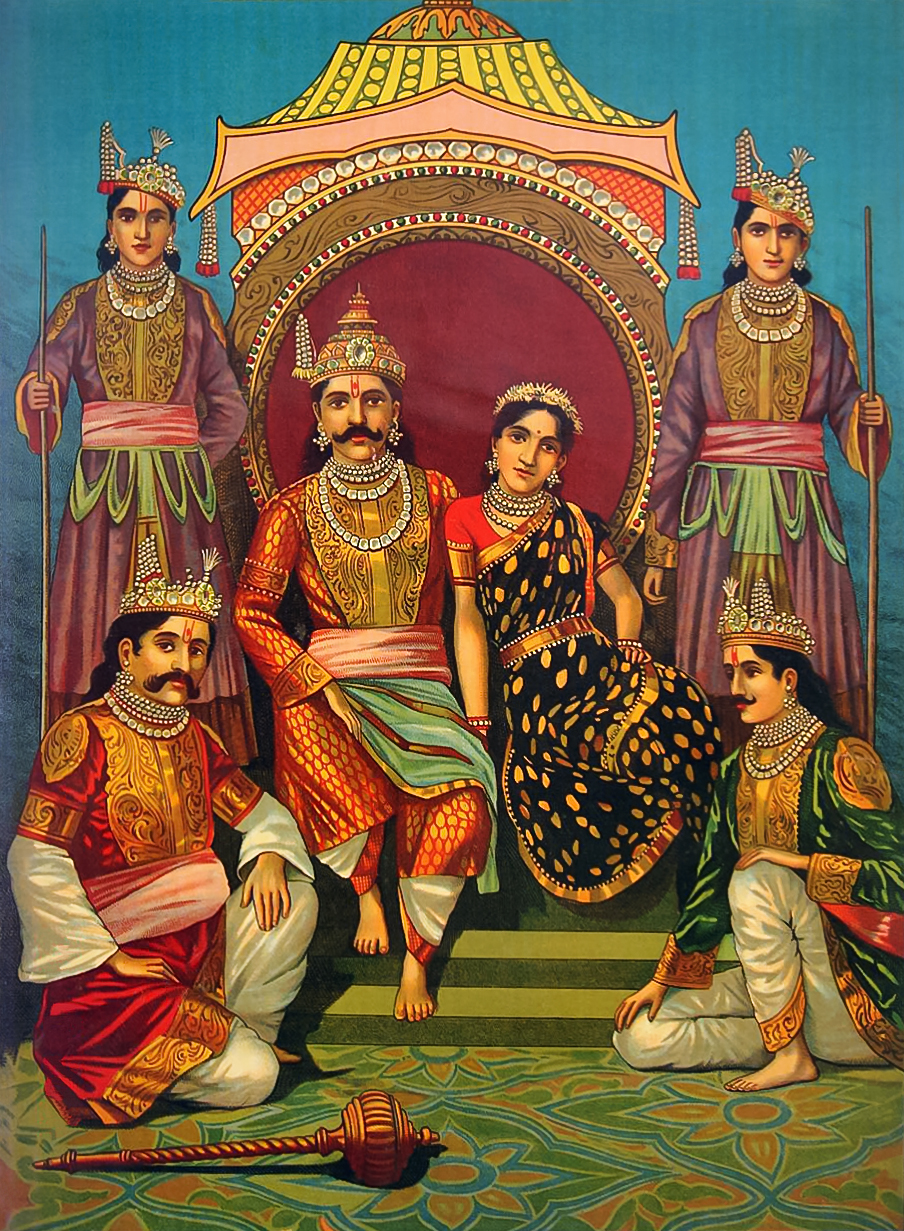
The Pandava brothers—Yudhishthira (centre), Bhima (bottom left), Arjuna (bottom right), Nakula and Sahadeva (both standing beside the throne)—with their common consort, Draupadi. Raja Ravi Varma Press lithograph.

Draupadi's marriage to the five Pandava brothers is one of the most distinctive aspects of her narrative in the Mahabharata, and it sets her apart in the epic tradition of ancient India. Polyandry (a woman having multiple husbands), though exceedingly rare in historical records of Hindu society, is a notable feature in the Mahabharata, where several female figures across four generations are portrayed with multiple sexual partners. Among these, Draupadi's situation is particularly extraordinary, as she is portrayed with five legitimate husbands—the Pandavas—even though polygyny (a man having multiple wives) was the norm throughout much of Hindu history, while polyandry for women was socially impermissible.

The epic offers multiple explanations for Draupadi's polyandrous marriage, suggesting a certain discomfort or moral tension around the arrangement. The first explanation is situational: The Pandavas return from svayamvara to their mother Kunti, calling out from outside to surprise her, "Look what alms we have brought." Without seeing them, Kunti instructs them to share what they have found, a statement that leads to a significant misunderstanding. When she realizes that the "alms" is a bride, she is shocked. Yudhishthira initially assigns Draupadi to Arjuna as the winner of the contest, but Arjuna insists that the eldest brother must marry first. At that moment, all five brothers are visibly enraptured (fascinated) by Draupadi. Recognizing the intensity of their shared affection and recalling Vyasa's earlier prophecy, Yudhishthira speaks decisively to his brothers, seeking to prevent conflict among them: "The lovely Draupadi shall be the wife of all of us" Acknowledging the implausibility of this justification, the text later provides additional, more mythological explanations.

Draupadi joins the household where she spends her first night conversing with the Pandavas about war and weapons. Dhrishtadyumna, who secretly followed, observes their humble household, and returning to his father, reports. Drupada sends a messenger to bring them to the palace. Pandavas, along with Kunti and Drupadi, proceed to the royal residence, where Drupada has arranged displays representing various trades and social classes. Kunti and Drupadi withdraw to the women's quarters while Drupada announces that Drupadi will marry Arjuna upon confirming Pandavas' identities. Yudhishthira, however, declares that she will become the common wife of all five brothers. Drupada furiously protests, questioning the propriety of such a union. At that moment, the divine-sage Vyasa arrives and is asked to give his opinion. He listens to each viewpoint: Drupada opposes the marriage, Dhrishtadyumna remains undecided, while Yudhishthira and Kunti support it. Vyasa ultimately approves the arrangement and retires with Drupada to the inner chambers for further discussion, where the second and third justificatons behind Draupadi is disclosed. It is notable that throughout the discussion regarding her polyandry, Draupadi remains silent.

==== Goddess Shri ====
One mythic justification in the Adi Parva (1.196) reveals that all five Pandavas are partial incarnations of the god Indra, the king of gods, and Draupadi is an incarnation of Shri, goddess of sovereignty and prosperity. Vyasa narrates that once, during a twelve-year-long yajna conducted by Yama, the god of death, on the banks of the Ganga, no death occurs in the world. Amid this cosmic pause, Shri appears in enigmatic form—a weeping, alluring figure whose tears transform into golden lotuses as they fall into the river. Her presence captivates Indra, who follows the trail of these lotuses to encounter the god Shiva, engaged in a game of dice with his consort. However, Indra fails to recognise Shiva and speaks to him disrespectfully. As a consequence, Shiva curses him and sends him to a cave-like netherworld, where four other proud Indras—Vishvabhuk, Bhūtadhāma, Śibi, Śānti, and Tejasvī—are already imprisoned. These five celestial beings are later reborn on earth as the five Pandava brothers. Shri, the enchantress responsible for Indra's descent, is also fated to accompany them in their human lives in the form of Draupadi.

This association of Draupadi with Shri directly connects her to kingship: the Pandavas' legitimacy to rule is symbolically reinforced through their union with Shri incarnate. The identification, retained in the Critical Edition, underscores Draupadi's exceptional status among female figures in the epic. Conversely, a passage found in the Northern Recension attributes the identity of Shri to Rukmini, Krishna's principal wife, aligning her with the later Puranic tradition of Shri-Lakshmi as Vishnu’s consort, and re-identifies Draupadi as Shachi, the wife of Indra—likely due to her marriage to Indra's partial incarnations. (Note: According to scholar Alf Hiltebeitel, marriage of Arjuna and Draupadi raises a central issue in myth and epic: if Sri-Lakshmi is the consort of Vishnu, what then is Krishna’s relationship to Draupadi, as an incarnation of Sri, once she is married to Arjuna and his brothers? This question becomes more complex with the recognition of Arjuna’s links not only to Indra, his divine father, but also to Shiva, through his ascetic and yogic nature. The roles of Krishna and Vyasa in arranging the marriage seem directed not only toward forming a royal alliance between the incarnations of Sri and Indra, but also toward furthering the destructive potential in the union of the dark, fire-born Draupadi—as a form of the Devi—with Arjuna, who reflects the ascetic force of Shiva.) Scholars argue that such reassignments are later interpolations and Draupadi's association with Shri is repeatedly emphasized throughout the entire epic. The shift reflects a post-epic tendency to reduce Draupadi's multivalent identity into a conventional divine pairing, thereby diminishing her broader mythological role as Shri, the force of prosperity and sovereignty essential to the restoration of dharma.

==== Sage's daughter ====
Another mythological strand within Vyasa's justification in Adi Parva (1.189) offers an alternative and deeply symbolic origin for Draupadi's polyandry, tying her birth to a former life as the unnamed daughter of a great sage. In this account, the sage's daughter performs severe austerities and pleases the god Shiva, to whom she prays with the desire for a virtuous husband. However, either through intense yearning or the repetition of her prayer five times, she ends up asking for a husband not once, but five times. Shiva, in response, grants her the boon that she will have five virtuous husbands in her next life. When Shiva informs her of this fate, she objects, stating that it would violate dharma for a woman to have more than one husband, as it would lead to promiscuity and loss of social honour. She further insists that her husband should have her as a virgin. To resolve this tension, Shiva assures her that in her future life, she will be ritually purified each month through menstruation and will regain her virginity after every sexual union, thus preserving both her chastity and her alignment with dharma.

==== Nalayani ====
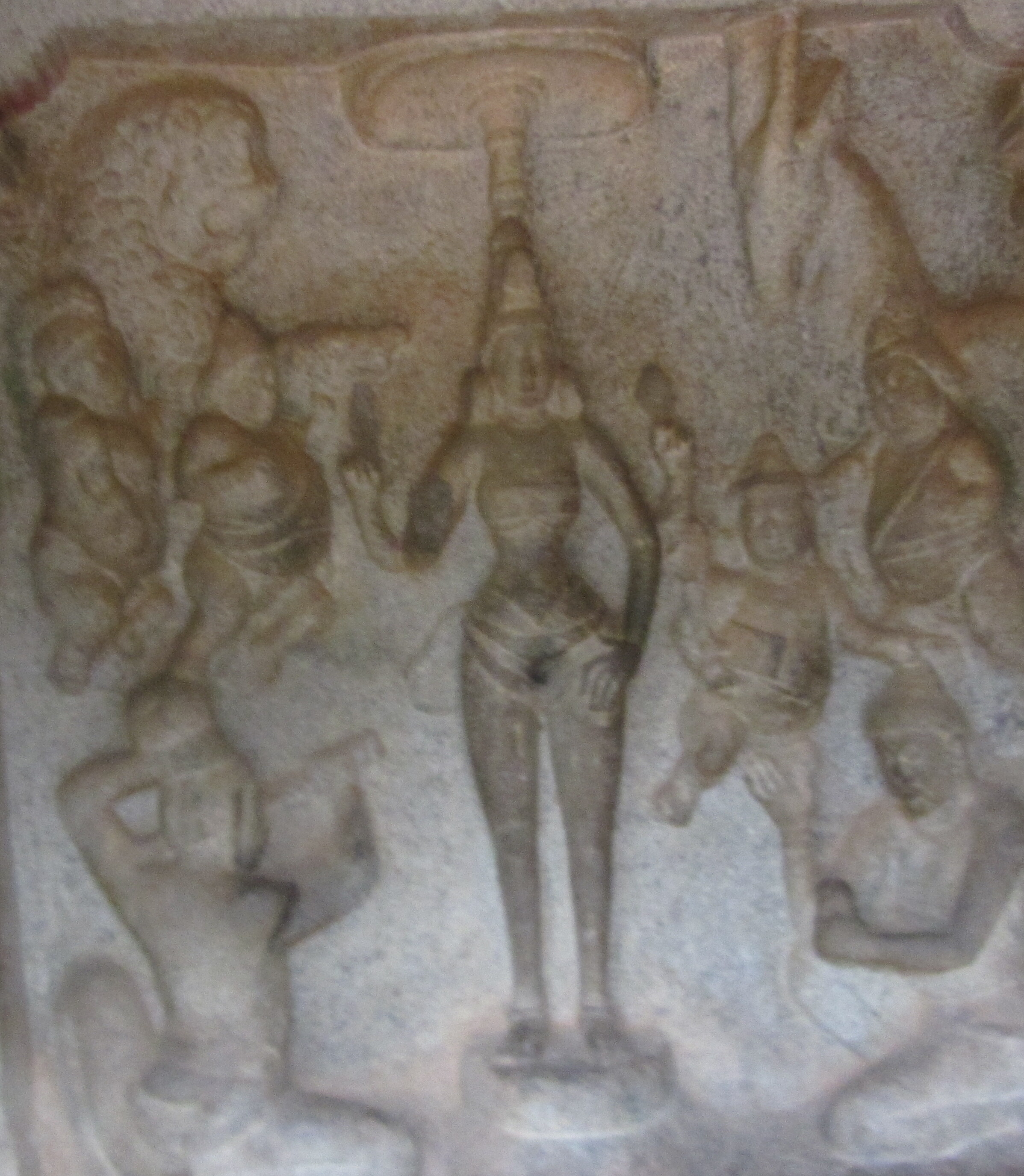
A temple relief depicting Nalayani at Mahabalipuram, Tamil Nadu

A third, and notably divergent, explanation for Draupadi's polyandry appears in the Southern recension of the Mahabharata, which introduces a prior birth as Nalayani, also called Indrasena. This account, absent in the Northern version of the epic, is widely regarded by scholars as a later interpolation and is excluded from the Critical Edition.

According to this version, Nalayani is the devoted wife of the sage Maudgalya, a man afflicted with leprosy, old age, and a foul temper. Pleased by her loyalty, Maudgalya offers her a boon. She asks to enjoy a long erotic life with him in five beautiful forms. Maudgalya agrees, and the two roam the world for many years in different forms. After thousands of years of this life, Maudgalya grows tired and returns to asceticism. Nalayani begs him to continue their pleasures, but he becomes angry and curses her to be reborn as a woman who will have five husbands to satisfy her. Grieved by the curse, Nalayani performs severe penance. She stands amid five fires and pleases Shiva, who grants Draupadi the two boons: in her next birth, she will have five great husbands equal in valour to Indra, and she will regain her virginity with each one.

=== Wedding and children ===
Granted temporary divine-vision to see Draupadi's true form as Shri, Drupada finally accepts the arrangement and declares that what has been set by fate cannot be undone and gives his consent. Vyasa advises that Yudhishthira, the eldest Pandava, wed Draupadi first. Under the guidance of their family priest Dhaumya, Yudhishthira marries Draupadi in a Vedic ceremony, and in the days that follow, the other four Pandavas each marry Draupadi, one after the other, with a day's interval between each wedding. Kunti blesses Draupadi to lead the Pandavas, while Krishna sends gifts for her. According to Katz, while Draupadi becomes the shared wife of all five Pandava brothers, Arjuna remains her primary husband, a status derived both from the fact that he wins her hand at the svayamvara and from textual evidence indicating that Draupadi prefers and loves him above the others. McGrath, however, notes that it is Bhima who appears to share the closest bond with her—throughout the narrative, Bhima is consistently portrayed as attentive to Draupadi's wishes and emotional wellbeing, often acting on her behalf when others remain passive.

With the Pandavas' survival revealed, Dhritrashtra invites the Pandavas to Hastinapura and proposes that the kingdom be divided. The Pandavas are assigned the unreclaimed desert Khandavaprastha, which they rebuild into the glorious Indraprastha with divine help. Later, at Indraprastha, upon the urging of the sage Narada, who warns that a rivalry can develop between brothers regarding Draupadi, a rotation system was established in which Draupadi spent one year with each Pandava in turn, with strict rules governing their access to her chamber during others' assigned periods. The brothers agreed that none should intrude if Draupadi was alone with one of the others, the penalty for doing so being 1 year (or 12 years depending upon the recension) to be spent in exile.

Draupadi becomes the mother of five sons, one by each of the Pandava brothers. Despite the practice of polyandry, the sons are recognized as legitimate and are collectively known as the Draupadeyas. Their names are Prativindhya (fathered by Yudhishthira), Sutasoma (fathered by Bhima), Shrutakarma (fathered by Arjuna), Satanika (fathered by Nakula) and Shrutasena (fathered by Sahadeva). Ashwatthama later kills the Draupadeyas during his surprise raid on Pandava camp on the eighteenth day of the war to avenge the death of his father Drona.

=== Queen of Indraprastha ===
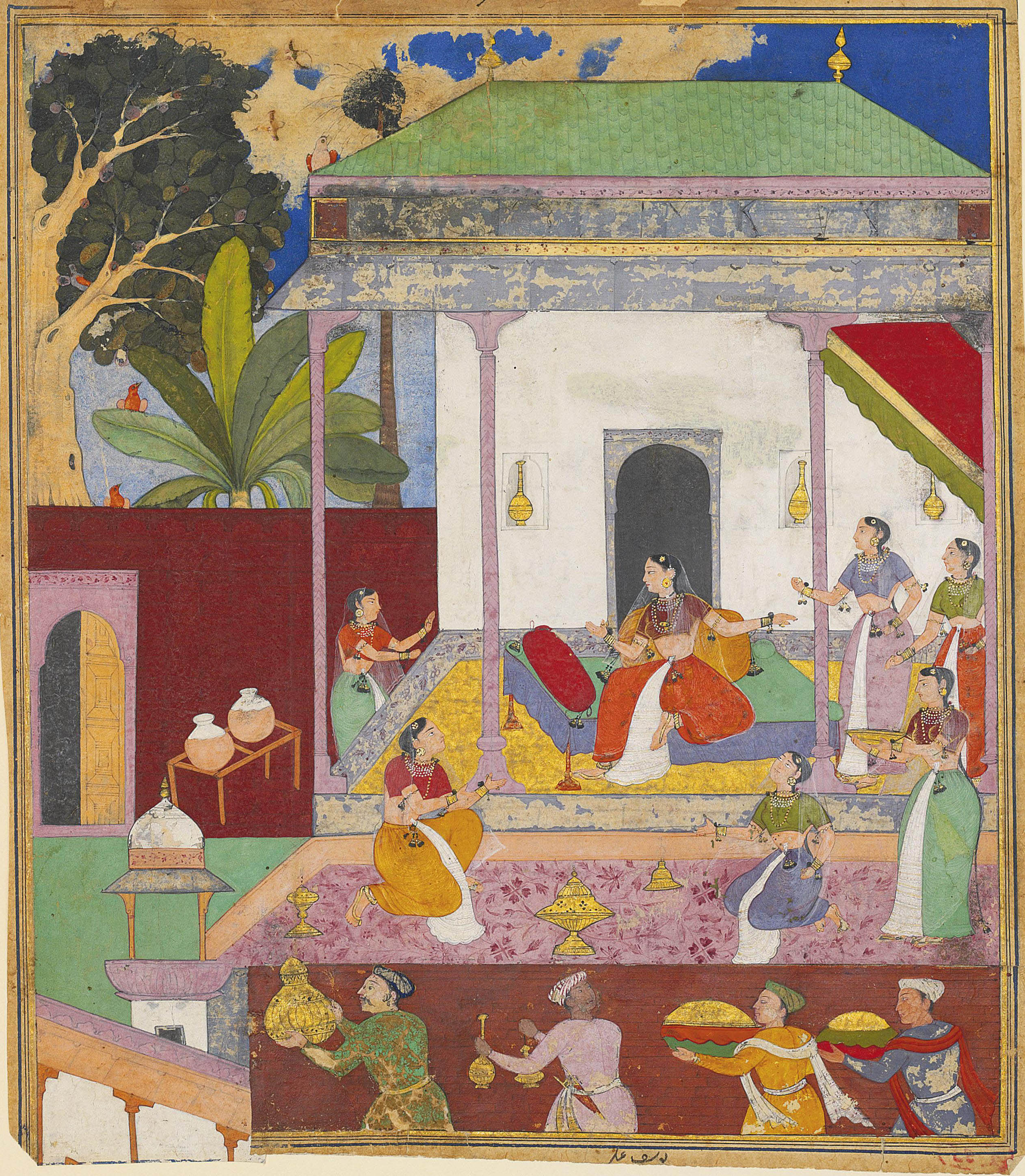
A illustration from the Razmnama (the Persian translation of the Mahabharata) depicting Draupadi (centre) with her attendants, c. 1617

Draupadi is titled as the mahishi—'the chief queen'. In the Mahabharata, four defining characteristics are attributed to her status: she is priyā (beloved), darśanīyā (beautiful), paṇḍitā (learned), and pativratā (dedicated to her husband).

Within the hierarchy of the Pandavas' household, Draupadi acknowledges her subordination to her mother-in-law, Kunti, and does not attempt to undermine her authority. Despite being the principal wife of the Pandavas, Draupadi states that she serves them "along with their wives", thus recognizing the collective dynamic of the polygamous household in which she lives. A notable incident during this period occurs when Arjuna breaks the pact made among the brothers by entering Draupadi's chamber while she is with Yudhishthira, in order to retrieve his weapons. As a result, he is obliged to go into exile. At the end of this exile, Arjuna returns with his new bride—Subhadra, the sister of Krishna. This stirs envy and anger in Draupadi, marking the only instance in the epic where she displays co-wife rivalry with any of the other subordinate wives of the Pandavas. However, this tension soon transforms into sisterly acceptance when Subhadra expresses deference and submission to Draupadi.

In addition to her deferential conduct, Draupadi exercised significant administrative and managerial authority within the royal household. Before the Pandavas's exile, she recounts overseeing an expansive retinue, including thousands of Brahmins, students, and ascetics, all of whom she ensured were well-fed and cared for with precision and oversight. She claims personal knowledge of the activities of servants and cowherds and asserts that she alone was responsible for monitoring and regulating their duties. Draupadi is shown to have the mastery of finance; further stating that she was singularly aware of the kingdom's financial operations, knowing both the revenues and expenditures, and that she oversaw a treasury said to be as vast and inexhaustible as the hoards of the ocean god Varuna.

==== Rajasuya ====
Soon after Arjuna's return, Draupadi resides in the newly constructed Mayasabha—'palace of illusions'. Following this, Yudhishthira performs the Rajasuya yajna with Draupadi by his side; the Pandavas gains lordship over many regions. Draupadi's role during the Rajasuya is revealed by Duryodhana, who reports to his father that how he had observed Draupadi serving food to everyone, including physically challenged citizens. He says to his father, "And, O king, Yajnaseni, without having eaten herself, daily seeth whether everybody, including even the deformed and the dwarfs, hath eaten or not."

A widely circulated myth attributes Duryodhana's enmity towards Draupadi to an incident that occurs during this event. While exploring the palace during the Rajasuya yajna, Duryodhana mistakes a polished floor for solid ground and falls into a hidden pool. According to the legend, Draupadi and her maids, observing from a balcony, laugh at him and mockingly call out "a blind man's son is blind". However, this account is absent from the original Mahabharata and appears to originate from a much later dramatic retelling. In the original Sanskrit epic, the incident unfolds differently. Bhima, Arjuna, Nakula, and Sahadeva, along with their entourages, witness Duryodhana's fall and laugh at his misfortune. Draupadi is not mentioned in this scene—neither participating in the laughter nor mocking him. Despite this, Duryodhana feels deeply humiliated by the reaction of the Pandavas and their servants. Upon returning to Hastinapura, he voices his anguish to his father, expressing resentment over the Pandavas' prosperity, which had been bolstered by the Rajasuya yajna. In his account, Duryodhana briefly refers to Draupadi, claiming that she also laughed along with the other women, even though the original scene marks her absence. Draupadi's laughter went on to be singled out and romanticized by writers for centuries as a cause for the dice-game, and the war. In Vyasa's Sanskrit epic, however, her role in the scene is trivial compared to the exaggerated treatment it has received in popular adaptations.

=== Game of dice and humiliation ===
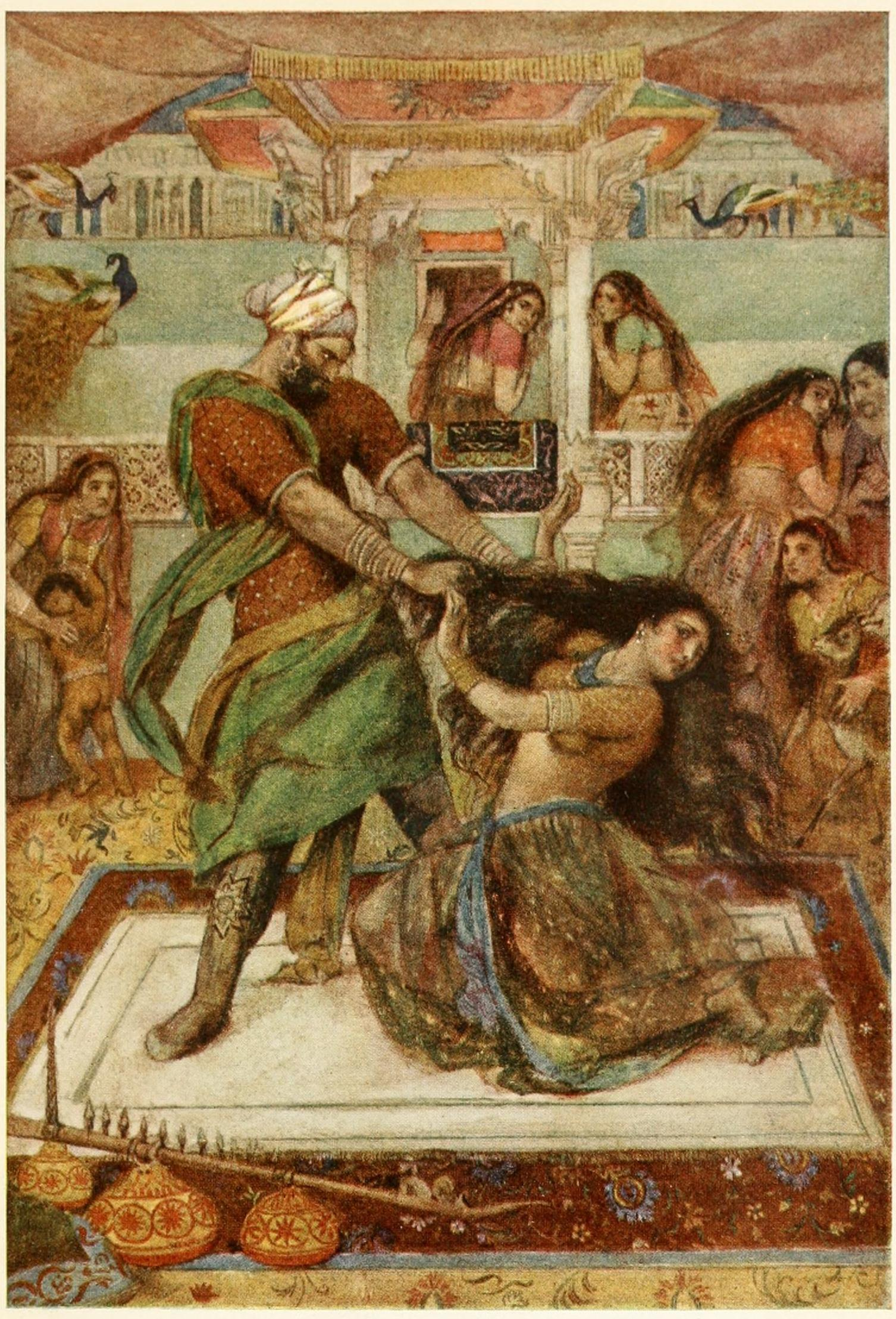
Draupadi being dragged by Dushasana, illustration by Evelyn Paul

Narrated in the Sabha Parva, this key incident is often considered to mark a definitive moment in the story of Mahabharata. It is one of the driving reasons that ultimately led to the Kurukshetra War.

Witnessing the Rajasuya, a jealous Duryodhana conspires with his maternal uncle Shakuni, an expert in dice and trickery, to summon the Pandavas to Hastinapura and win their kingdoms in a game of gambling. Yudhishthira and his family go to Hastinapura to accept the challenge. He stakes and loses his wealth, his brothers, and himself. When Shakuni suggests he stake Draupadi, Yudhishthira agrees—leaving the assembled men horrified—and loses her as well. The assembly members are dismayed, except for Duryodhana’s party (Duryodhana, Duhshasana, Shakuni, and Karna), who are overjoyed. Duryodhana orders that Draupadi be brought to join the serving girls. He first commands his uncle Vidura to fetch her, but Vidura refuses. Duryodhana sends an usher (pratikramin), who delivers the summons. Draupadi is horrified at learning her fate; she refuses to come and questions the legality of a husband staking his wife and sends him back to ask whether Yudhisthira lost himself first or her. Yudhishthira remains silent and Duryodhana insists she come to the assembly to put the question herself.The usher returns; Draupadi refuses again and replies that she will follow whatever the elders conversant with dharma decide. The usher reports; the assembly is silent. With Yudhishthira sending his own trusted messenger, Draupadi arrives in the assembly hall clad in a single garment and stands before the king Dhritrashtra. Duryodhana orders the usher to forcibly bring her near him so the Kauravas can answer to her face. The usher hesitates, fearing her and Bhima's wrath. Irritated, Duryodhana orders Duhshasana to go himself and drag her by force. Draupadi tries to seeks refuge among the women of Dhritarashtra’s household present in the assembly, which includes the Kaurava mother Gandhari and her daughters-in-law. However, he seizes her by her long hair and ignores her protests that she is menstruating and wearing a single garment, and drags her into the assembly, near Duryodhana.

Seeing this, Bhima pledges to cut off Dushasana's hands, as they touched Draupadi's hair. Now in an emotional appeal to the elders present in the forum, Draupadi repeatedly questions the legality of the right of Yudhishthira to place her at stake.

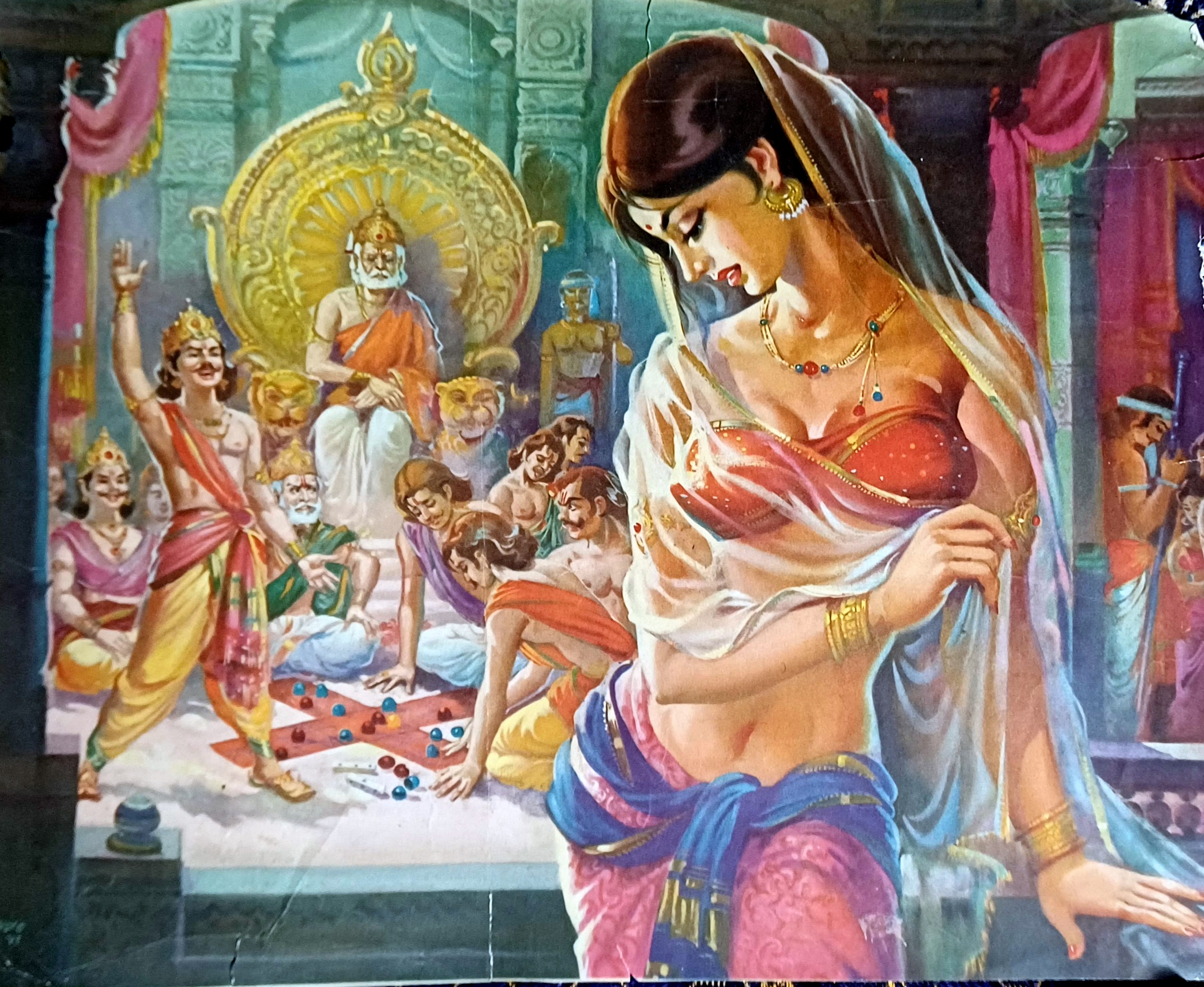
An illustration of Draupadi's disobedience in court of Kurus

In order to provoke the Pandavas further, Duryodhana bares and pats his thigh looking into Draupadi's eyes, implying that she should sit on his thigh. The enraged Bhima vows in front of the entire assembly that he would break Duryodhana's thighs, or else accept being Duryodhana's slave for seven lifetimes. At this time Vikarna, a brother of Duryodhana asks the kings assembled in the court to answer the question of Draupadi. He gives his opinion that Draupadi is not won rightfully as Yudhishthira lost himself first before staking her. Besides, no one has the right to put a woman on bet according to shastras; not a husband, father, or even the gods. Hearing these words, Karna gets angry and says that when Yudhishthira lost all his possession he also lost Draupadi, even specifically staking her. Karna calls Draupadi a "courtesan" for being the wedded wife of five men, adding that her being to the court is not a surprising act whether she is clothed or naked. He then instructs Dushasana to remove the garments of Draupadi.

Dushasana attempts to disrobe her, but she is miraculously protected when Dushasana finds that as he continues to unwrap the layers of her sari, the amount of fabric covering her never lessens. Dushasana is eventually reduced to exhaustion, as the awed court observes that Draupadi is still chastely dressed. While this miraculous protection is often attributed to Krishna's divine intervention and many recensions include that Draupadi pleads to Krishna for aid, Franklin Edgerton's research on the Sabhaparvan Critical Edition indicates this account is likely a later addition. At this point, a furious Bhima vows to drink blood from Dushasana's chest, at the pain of not seeing his ancestors entering heaven. This vow unsettles the entire court.

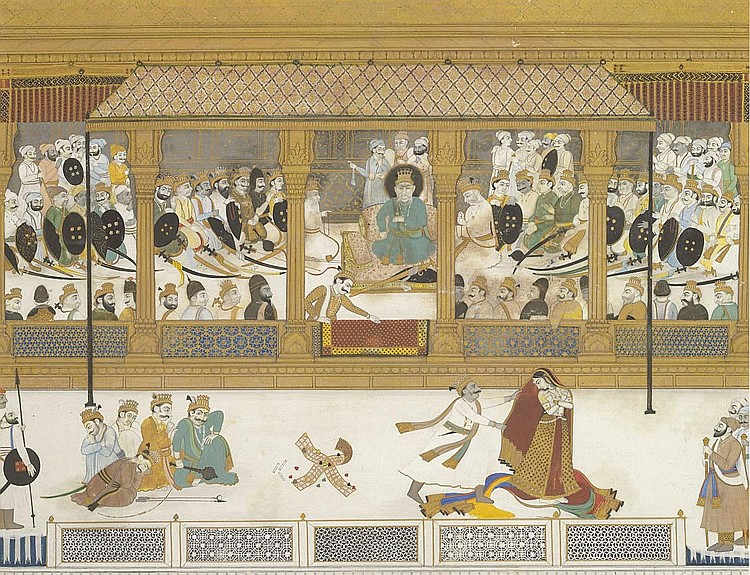
Pahari painting depicting attempted disrobing of Draupadi in the Kuru court

The only Kauravas who object to the disrobing of Draupadi in the court are Vikarna and Yuyutsu. Vidura openly calls Duryodhana a snake and demon after finding no support even from his own brother, Vidura is helpless. Karna further orders Dushasana to take Draupadi to the servants' quarters and derisively asks her to choose another husband who unlike Yudhishthira would not gamble her away. Just then, jackals call out as a mark of evil omen. Queen Gandhari enters the scene and counsels Dhritarashtra to undo her sons' misdeeds. Fearing the ill-omens, Dhritarashtra intervenes and grants Draupadi a boon. Draupadi asks that her husband Yudishthira be freed from bondage so her son Prativindhya would not be called a slave. In order to pacify her further, Dhritarashtra offers a second boon. Calmly, she asks for the freedom of the Pandavas along with their weapons. When Dhritarashtra asks her for her third wish, she reminds him that a Kshatriya woman can seek only two wishes, three would be a sign of greed. Dhritarashtra gives them back their wealth and grants them permission to go home.

Amused by the sudden turn of events, Karna remarks that they "have never heard of such an act, performed by any of the women noted in this world for their beauty." He taunts the Pandavas by praising their wife, as she had rescued them "like a boat from their ocean of distress".

Having restored their pride and wealth, the Pandavas and Draupadi leave for Indraprastha, only to receive another invitation for a game of dice, in which the loser would be given an exile of 12 years followed by a year of Ajnatavasa, meaning "living in incognito". Yudhishtira yet again accepts the invitation and loses, and goes on an exile with his brothers and wife Draupadi.

=== Vanavasa ===
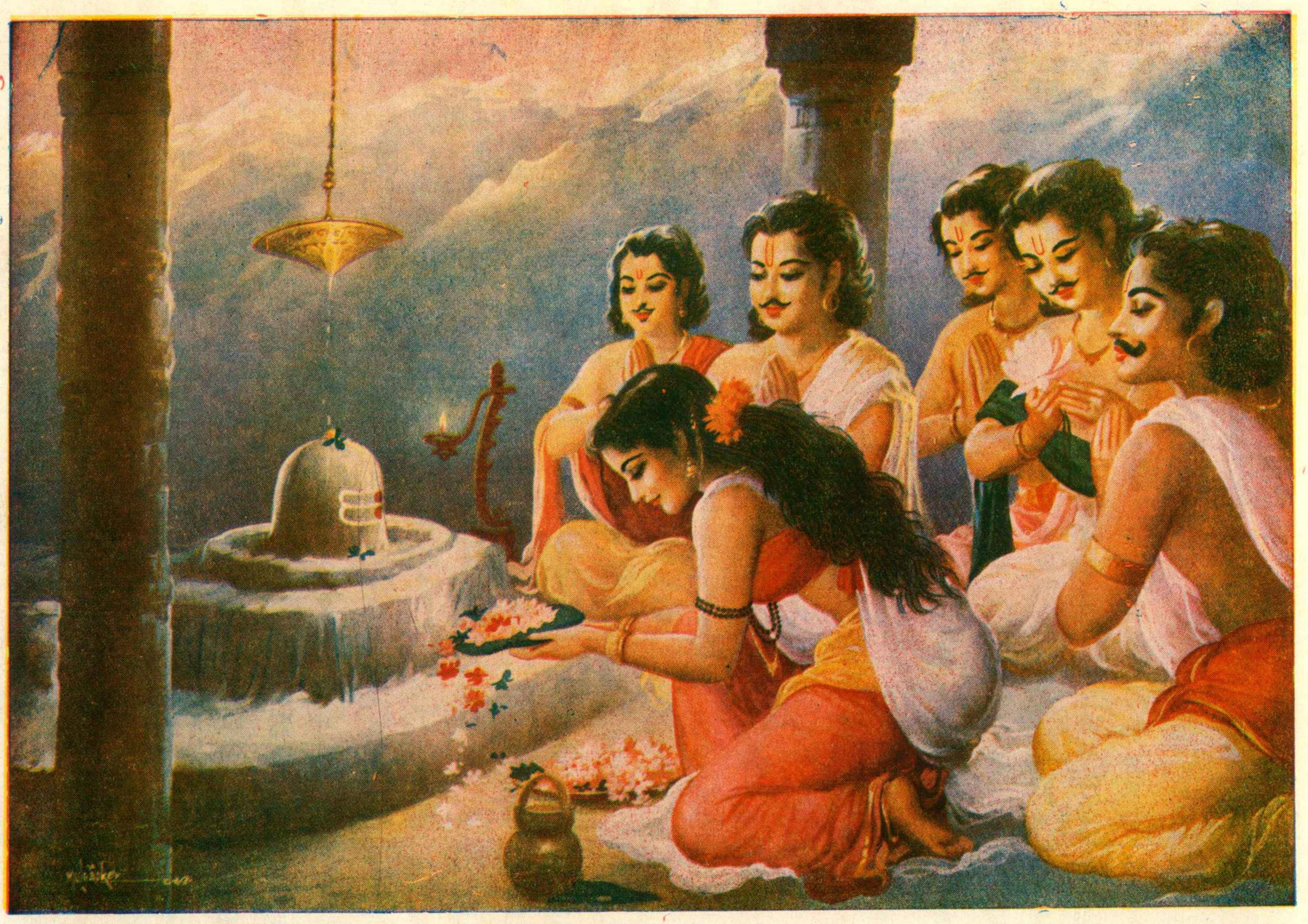
The Pandavas and Draupadi worshipping Shiva during their exile, a scene from the Vana Parva

During the thirteen years of exile (Vanavasa) mandated after the dice game, Draupadi, along with the Pandavas, endured a life of hardship and privation in the forests, as detailed in the Vana Parva of the Mahabharata. Narrative accounts within this Parva describe several key episodes. In the Kamyakavana, Draupadi was threatened by the demon Kirmira, brother of Baka, and Bhima is described as intervening and killing him to protect her. The text also narrates Draupadi offering support and comfort to Yudhishthira during their exile. Certain passages depict Draupadi expressing her distress and, in some instances, voicing condemnation of the Devas. Further, narratives recount Draupadi's desire for the Saugandhika flowers, prompting Bhima to undertake a journey to fulfill her request. The Mahabharata describes Draupadi's abduction by the Rakshasa Jatasura while they were residing in the Badarikashrama, and the subsequent rescue by the Pandavas. Following this incident, the narrative indicates that Draupadi and the Pandavas resided at the hermitage of Arishtisena. The Vana Parva also includes passages where Draupadi imparts instructions on the duties of a wife to Satyabhama, Krishna's wife.

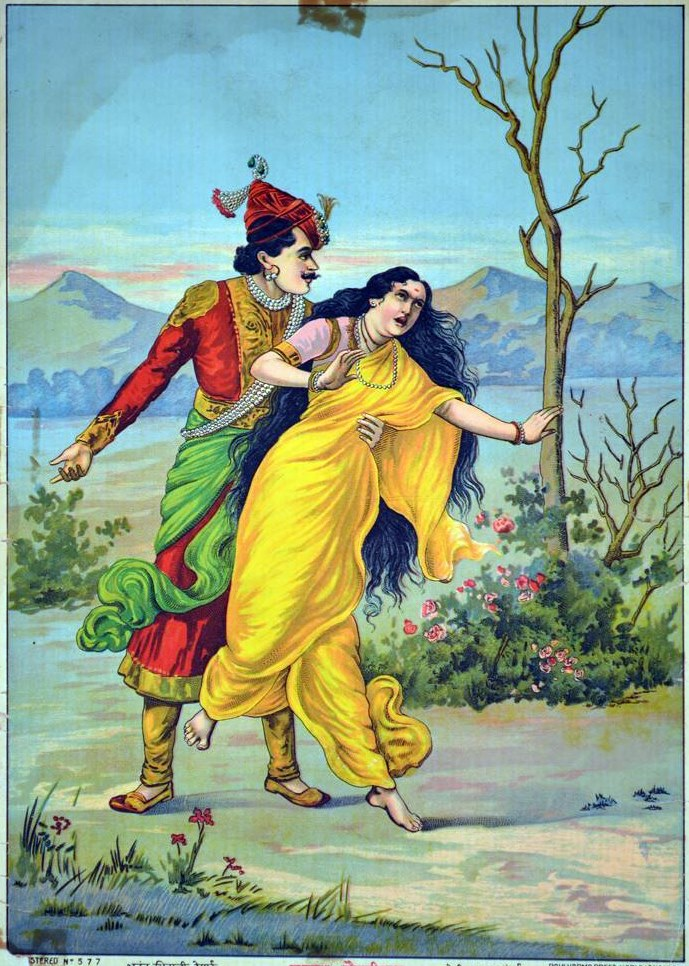
A Ravi Varma print depicting Jayadratha abducting Draupadi

A widely popular narrative, though considered by scholars to be an interpolation, recounts an incident during this period involving sage Durvasa. According to this account, after Draupadi and the Pandavas had finished their meal prepared using the Akshay Patra, Durvasa and his disciples arrived unexpectedly. Sent by Duryodhana with the intent of having the sage curse the Pandavas, they were received with hospitality. Durvasa requested food, but Draupadi found herself with no remaining provisions. Fearing the sage's potential curse, she prayed to Krishna. In response, Krishna requested the vessel from Draupadi, and upon consuming a single grain of rice remaining within, both Durvasa and his disciples experienced a sensation of having eaten a lavish meal. They departed satisfied. Notably, this incident is absent from the Critical Edition of the Mahabharata.

While the Pandavas were in the Kamyaka forest, they often went hunting, leaving Draupadi alone. At this time Jayadratha, the son of Vriddhakshatra and the husband of Duryodhana's sister Dussala, passed through Kamyaka forest on the way to Salva Desa. Jayadratha met Draupadi and then started beseeching her to go away with him and desert her husband. Draupadi pointed out the immorality of deserting one's spouses when they were in difficulty and attempted to stall and dissuade Jayadratha by describing how the Pandavas would punish him. Failing with words, Jayadratha forced her onto his chariot. Meanwhile, the Pandavas finished their hunt and found Draupadi missing. Learning of their wife's abduction by Jayadratha they rushed to save her. On seeing the Pandavas coming after him, Jayadratha left Draupadi on the road, though ultimately the Pandavas managed to arrest him. Arjuna urged Bhima to spare Jayadratha's life for the sake of Dussala and Gandhari, much to the indignation of Draupadi. In some versions of the story, Yudhishthira asks Draupadi to pass the sentence since it was she who was attacked, and she begrudgingly counsels to spare him because of the relations they share. Before freeing him, the Pandavas shaved Jayadratha's head at five places in order to publicly humiliate him.

=== Ajnatavasa (Incognito) ===
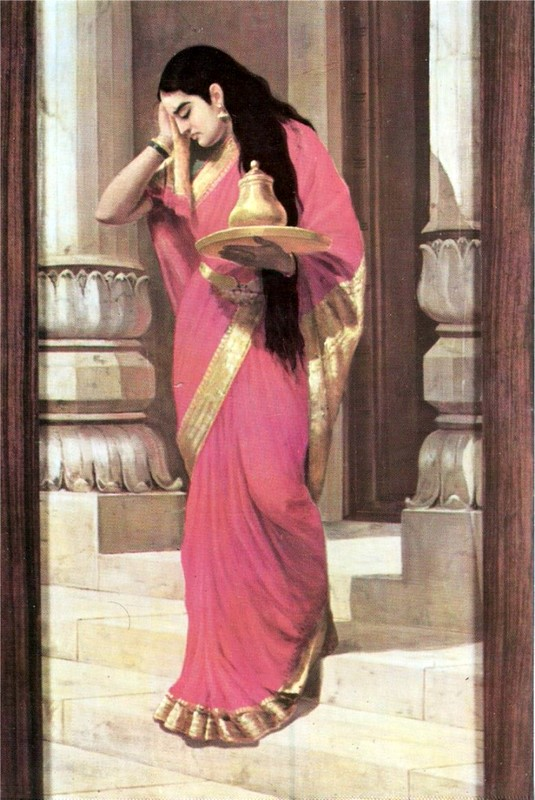
A painting by Raja Ravi Varma depicting Draupadi, who is disguised as Sairandhri, carrying wine to Kichaka's chambers

On the thirteenth year of their exile, the Pandavas choose to stay in the Matsya Kingdom. Draupadi becomes the maid of Sudeshna, queen of Matsya, and serves her. One day Kichaka, Sudeshna's brother and the commander of king Virata's forces, happens to see Draupadi. He is filled with lust by looking at her and requests her hand in marriage. Draupadi refuses him, saying that she is already married to Gandharvas. Seeing his persistence, she warns Kichaka that her husbands are very strong and that he will not be able to escape death at their hands. Later, he convinces his sister, the queen Sudeshna, to help him win Draupadi. Sudeshna orders Draupadi to fetch wine from Kichaka's house, overriding Draupadi's protests. When Draupadi goes to get wine, Kichaka tries to molest her.

Draupadi escapes and runs into the court of Virata. Kichaka kicks her in front of all the courtiers, including Yudhishthira. Fearful of losing his most powerful warrior, even Virat does not take any action. Bhima is present, and only a look from Yudhishthira prevents him from attacking Kichaka. Furious, Draupadi asks about the duties of a king and dharma. She then curses Kichaka with death by her husband's hand. Laughing it off, Kichaka only doubts their whereabouts and asks those present where the Gandharvas are. Yudhishthira addresses Draupadi as Sairandhri and orders her to go to the temple, as Kichaka would not do anything to her there (in some versions, he recommends she seeks refuge with the queen). With this, the king asks Kichaka to leave and praises Yudhishthira's reply as he himself could not think of anything.

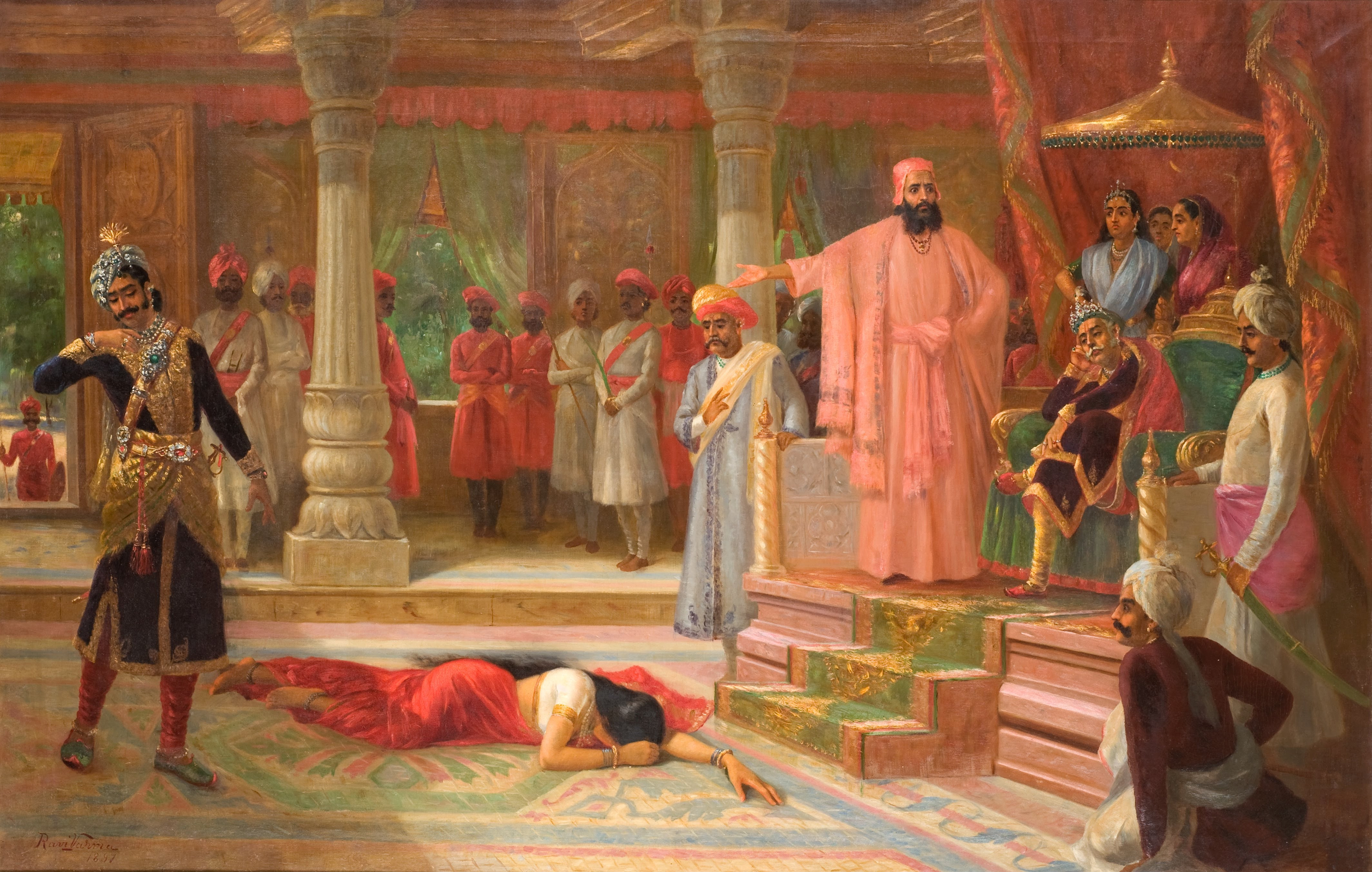
Draupadi in Virata's palace, painting by Raja Ravi Varma

Later that night, Bhima consoles Draupadi, and they hatch a plan to kill Kichaka. Draupadi meets with Kichaka, pretending to actually love him and agreeing to marry him on the condition that none of his friends or brothers will know about their relationship. Kichaka accepts her condition. Draupadi asks Kichaka to come to the dancing hall at night. Bhima (in the guise of Draupadi), fights with Kichaka and kills him.

Draupadi calls the members of Kichaka's family and shows them the mutilated body of Kichaka. The murder is attributed to her Gandharva husbands. This angers Kichaka's brothers and they decide to burn her along with Kichaka's body to take revenge. After getting permission from Virata, Draupadi is forcefully tied to Kichaka's pyre. Upon her pleading, Bhima runs for her help and kills the brothers of Kichaka, thus saving her from being burnt alive.

=== Kurukshetra War ===
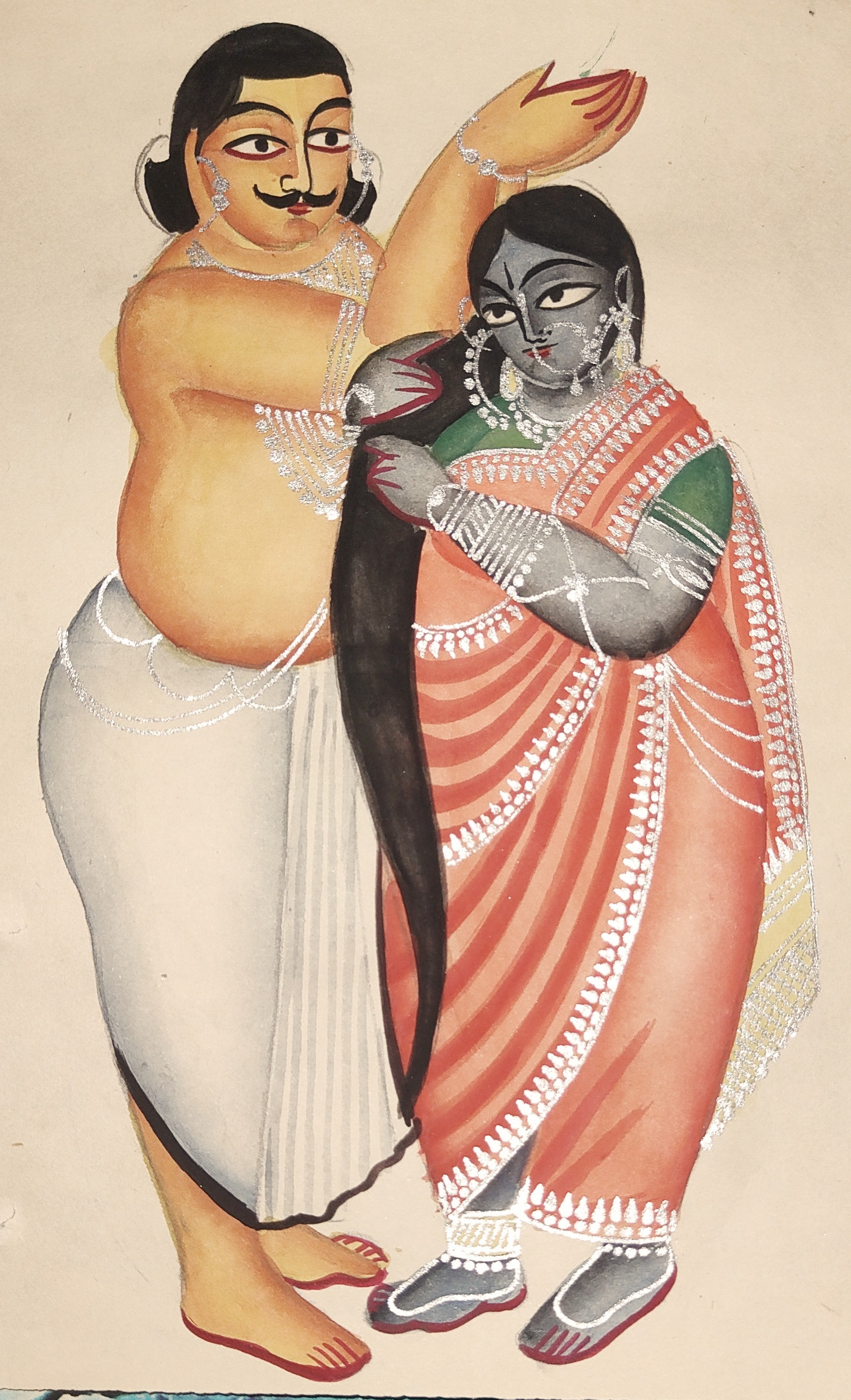
Bhimsen washing tresses of Draupadi with the blood of Dushasan, Mahabharat; Kalighat Painting

Following the completion of the thirteen-year exile and incognito period, the Pandavas sought the return of their rightful share of the kingdom. However, the Kauravas refused, escalating tensions and leading to the Kurukshetra War. Krishna, acting as a peace emissary, attempted to negotiate with Dhritarashtra, seeking to secure the Pandavas' share. Prior to his departure, Draupadi privately expressed her desire for war to Krishna. The peace mission failed, and the war commenced, resulting in significant casualties on both sides. During the war, Draupadi stayed in the city of Upaplavya. Notably, following the death of Abhimanyu, Subhadra's grief was profound, and Draupadi, in attempting to console her, fainted.

A popular myth, often depicted in well-known adaptations of Mahabharata, depicts Draupadi washing her hair with her brother-in-law Dushasana's blood, as a mark of her vengeance against the molestation she had suffered at the dice-game. Though an extremely powerful and symbolic theme, this incident does not appear in Vyasa's Sanskrit Mahabharata. Alf Hiltebeitel in his acclaimed research work, "The Cult of Draupadi" explores the source of this myth as he travels through the rural areas of India. He discovers that the first literary mention of the blood-washing theme appeared in "Venisamhara" or "Braiding The Hair (of Draupadi)", a Sanskrit play written in the Pallava period by eminent playwright Bhatta Narayana. Since then, this powerful theme of vengeance had been used in most retellings and adaptations on Mahabharat, thus mistakenly attributing the authorship to Veda Vyasa.

==== Ashwatthama's attack ====
Ashwathama, in order to avenge his father's as well as other Kuru warriors' deceitful killing by the Pandavas, attacks their camp at night with Kripacharya and Kritavarma. Ashwathama killed Dhrishtadyumna, Shikhandi, Draupadeyas, and the remaining Pandava and Panchala army. In the morning, Yudhishthira hears the news and asks Nakula to bring Draupadi from Matsya Kingdom. Draupadi vows that if the Pandavas do not kill Ashwatthama, she would fast to death. The Pandavas find Ashwatthama at Vyasa's hut. Arjuna and Ashwatthama end up firing the Brahmashirsha astra at each other. Vyasa intervenes and asks the two warriors to withdraw the destructive weapon. Not endowed with the knowledge to do so, Ashwatthama instead redirects the weapon to Uttara's womb, but Krishna protects the Pandavas' only heir with his Sudarshana Chakra. Krishna curses him for this act. Ashwatthama is caught by the Pandavas and his jewel is taken away. Draupadi gives the jewel to Yudhishthira and forgives the killer of her children. Due to the power of meditation, her wrath is subdued and she speaks of Ashwathama, son of their preceptor Drona,

"I desired to only pay off our debt for the injury we have sustained. The preceptor's son is worthy of my reverence as the preceptor himself. Let the king bind this gem on his head, O Bharata!"

=== Later life and death ===
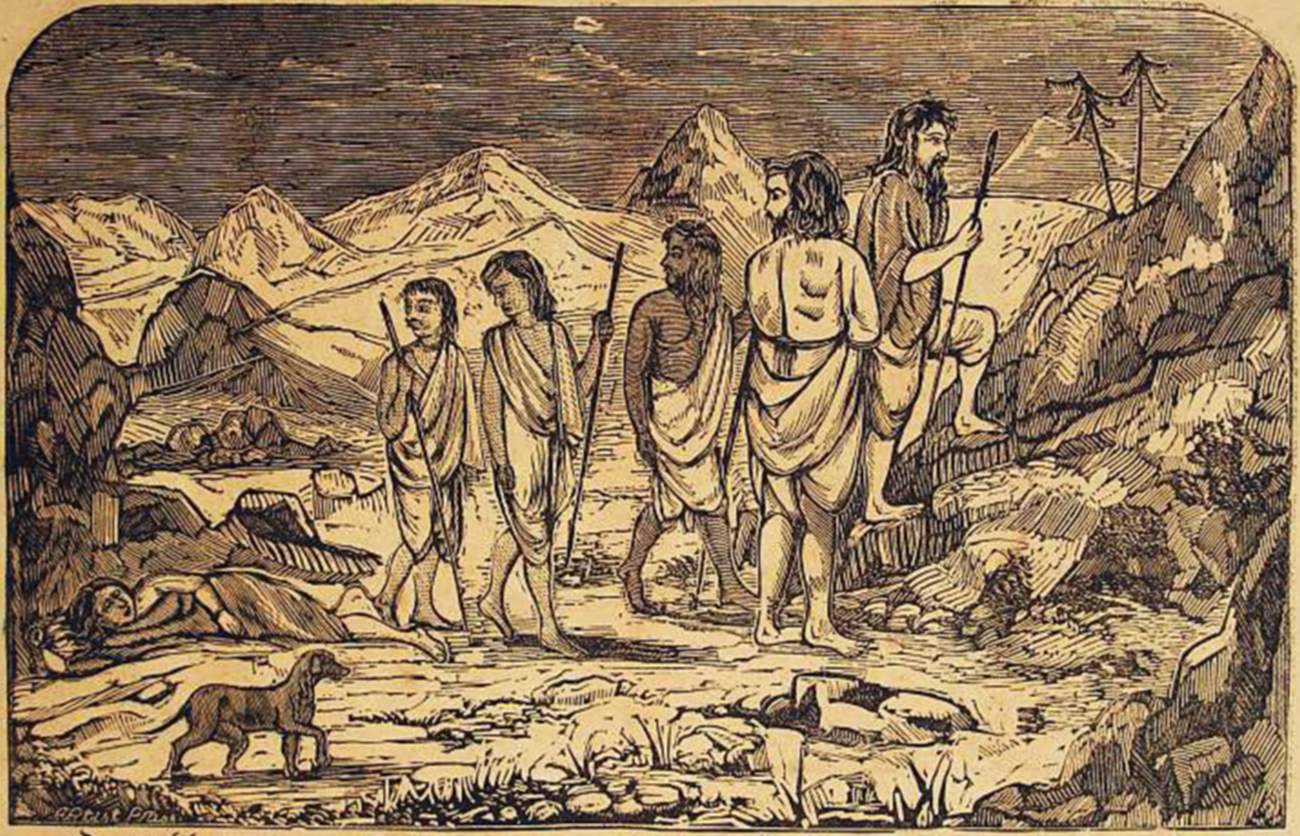
Draupadi falls dead as the Pandavas proceed to heaven, a 19th-century wood engraving

Following the Kurukshetra War, the Pandavas assumed control of Hastinapura, and Draupadi is described as being among those who encouraged Yudhishthira to assume the role of ruler. Yudhishthira subsequently performed an Ashvamedha Yajna, during which Draupadi presented gifts to her co-wives Chitrangada and Ulupi.

After the Ashvamedha, Draupadi resided in Hastinapura, providing service to both Kunti and Gandhari. When Dhritarashtra, Gandhari, and Kunti decided to depart for the forest, Draupadi expressed her wish to accompany them and offer assistance, but her offer was declined. During the Pandavas' reign in Hastinapura, visiting rishis and siddhas reportedly recognized Draupadi as an embodiment of the goddess Sri-Lakshmi.

Draupadi and Yudhishthira ruled for 36 years. When her husbands retired from the world and went on their journey towards the Himalayas and heaven, she accompanied them and was the first to fall dead on the journey as she loses her yogic concentration (and she was exhausted). When Bhima asked Yudhishthira why Draupadi had fallen, Yudhishthira attributed the reason as "partial towards Arjuna". However, on the other hand, the epic poets described her:

abhimānavatī nityaṃ viśeṣeṇa yudhiṣṭhire
"Always haughty, especially to Yudhiṣṭhira."

— Mahābhārata, XII.14.4

Afterward, Yudhisthira enquires Indra about her:

"Where [is] that tall dark one, possessed of energy and intelligence:
Draupadī, my beloved? Where is that best of young wives?"

— Mahābhārata, Book 17 (Mahaprasthanika Parva), 3.36

In Svargarohanika Parva, Yudhisthira goes to heaven and finally sees Draupadi seated as Goddess Sri-Lakshmi.

== Draupadi as a goddess ==
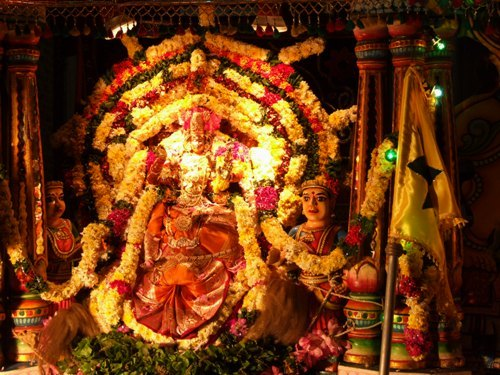
Draupati Amman idol in Udappu, Sri Lanka

The Draupadi Amman is a regional Hindu deity primarily worshipped by the Palli community as goddess of sex-positivism and was the primary inspiration for the community's widespread practice of polyandry and prostitution, which they later abandoned due to shaming from wider Tamil community, in medieval period.

The rituals are quite unique and aren't typical of the wider Tamil community. This tradition is widespread, with over 400 temples dedicated to Draupadi in South Indian states such as Andhra Pradesh, Tamil Nadu, and Karnataka, as well as in countries with a large Tamil population like Sri Lanka, Singapore, Malaysia, Mauritius, Réunion, and South Africa. Notably, fire walking or Thimithi is a prominent ritual performed at these temples. Additionally, Draupadi is worshipped as an incarnation of Adishakti and Parvati during the Bengaluru Pete's Bangalore Karaga festival, a nine-day event. Communities including the Pillais, Vanniyars, Mudaliyars, Konars, Gounders of Tamil Nadu, and the Tigala community of Karnataka also consider Draupadi Amman as their household deity (kuladevi).

These communities hold annual festivals and processions, with some lasting up to three weeks, such as the one in Durgasamudram, Tirupati. The Sri Dharmarayaswamy-Draupadi temple in Thigarapete, Bengaluru, is another significant site of worship.

== In other traditions ==
=== In Buddhism ===
In Theravada Buddhist literature, Draupadi appears in the Pali Canon as Kaṇhā (the Pali form of Kṛṣṇā), where her polyandrous marriage to the five Pandava princes is depicted in a very negative light within the Kuṇāla Jātaka (Jātaka No. 536, also known as the Mahākuṇāla Jātaka). The story is recounted by the Bodhisatta (born as Kuṇāla, king of the cuckoos) as a cautionary example of insatiable desire and infidelity of womankind.

According to the prose commentary of the Kuṇāla Jātaka, Kaṇhā is described as having two fathers. (dvipitika). Her biological father, the king of Kosala, was killed by King Brahmadatta of Benares and her pregnant mother was captured and made the wife of Brahmadatta. She was raised as the only child of Brahmadatta, who cherished her much. At her svayamvara, she passes over all assembled suitors until she sees the five sons of King Pāṇḍu—Ajjuna (Arjuna), Nakula, Bhīmasena (Bhima), Yudhiṭṭhila (Yudhishthira), and Sahadeva—standing together after returning from their studies at Takkasilā, and chooses to marry all five brothers simultaneously.

Unlike the Hindu Mahabharata, which presents Draupadi as a devoted and virtuous queen whose polyandry was divinely sanctioned, the Buddhist text portrays her as chronically unfaithful and dissatisfied. Even while married to the five Pāṇḍava princes, she carries on a secret affair with a deformed, hunchbacked royal attendant. When Ajjuna (identified as the Bodhisatta) discovers her infidelity and exposes her deceit to his brothers, the five Pāṇḍavas grow disillusioned with domestic life, abandon Kaṇhā and their kingdom, and retire to the Himalayas to become ascetics.

In Mahayana Buddhism, Kṛṣṇā Draupadī is presented in the Mahāvastu and the Lalitavistara as one among eight goddesses who reside in the western cardinal direction.

=== Jainism ===
In Digambara Jain scriptures like Harivamsa Purana, polyandry of Draupadi has been rejected and it is suggested that she was married only to Arjuna. Hemachandra, a Śvetāmbara Jain monk, accepts the polyandry in his work Triṣaṣṭi and further suggests that Draupadi was Nagasri in one of her previous lives and had poisoned a Jain monk. Therefore, she had to suffer in hell and animal incarnations for several lives before being born a woman who later became a Jain nun. After her death, she was reborn as Draupadi and was married to five Pandavas.

== In popular culture ==
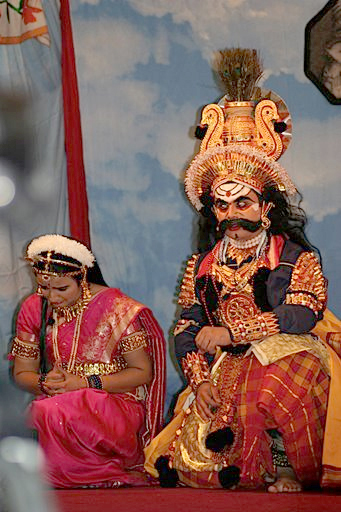
Draupadi and Bhima depicted by actors in yakshagana theatre

=== In folk cultures ===
- According to a folklore, Draupadi introduced the popular Indian snack Pani Puri.

=== Arts and dances ===
Karaga is a folk festival of Karnataka which originated as a ritual in Southern India dedicated to Draupadi as known in these parts as Droupadamma. The ritual is performed on a full moon day. The story of Draupadi is one of the central topics of Yakshagana, a traditional dance-play practised in Karnataka and Terukkuttu, a Tamil street theatre form practised in Tamil Nadu state of India and Tamil-speaking regions of Sri Lanka.

=== In literature ===
The fiery heroine of Mahabharata has been the topic of research and debate for centuries. There are various plays and novels based on her.

- Yajnaseni by Pratibha Ray – This novel, originally written in Odia was the recipient of Jnanpith Award. It was also translated in various languages like English, Hindi, Bengali, Tamil, Malayalam, etc.
- The Palace of Illusions: A Novel by Chitra Banerjee Divakaruni – Deviating much from the Sanskrit text, Divakaruni brings up the emotions of Draupadi, re-imagining the whole epic from her perspective.
- Draupadi by Yarlagadda Lakshmi Prasad, is a Sahitya Akademi Award-winning Telugu novel that narrates Mahabharata from Draupadi's perspective.
- The Cult of Draupadi by Alf Hiltebeitel – This trilogy is an exhaustive, scholarly account of the various folk traditions surrounding Draupadi in South India. Hiltebeitel travels through various parts of India, tracing and recording the lesser-known customs and tribes in Gingi Cult and much more, who extensively worship Draupadi as their deity – a status which has been attained by few Mahabharat characters. There are over 31 plays and ballads that are conducted in over 400 temples, that are dedicated to Draupadi Amman. The story of Draupadi creates great respect for women in society. Her sacrifice and her inner power defeats the evil activities performed on women
- Nathabati Anathbat by Shaoli Mitra – This is a stage play depicting the agony of Draupadi as a woman who "has five husbands, and yet none to protect her."
- Dopdi by Mahasweta Devi in Bengali – A contemporary tale of oppression with Draupadi as the lead character.
- The Great Indian Novel by Dr. Shashi Tharoor – Written as a fictional work that is analogous to the events featured in the Mahabharata in order to describe contemporary Indian Politics, Dr.Tharoor has described the character of 'Draupadi' as 'Di Mokrasi', who is an illegitimate daughter of 'Dhritarashtra' and 'Lady Drewpad' in the novel. Tharoor likens Draupadi to the tenets of 'Democracy'. As mentioned in Veda Vyasa's epic, he ascribes her to be the wife to all five 'Pandyas', who are themselves an abbreviation of different facets of Indian politics.

=== In politics ===
Ram Manohar Lohia proposed that Draupadi, the intelligent, sharp-witted, courageous, and fiercely independent heroine of the Mahabharata, represented the ideal of Indian womanhood, standing in contrast to the docile and obedient portrayal of Sati-Savitri. He used this cultural symbol to advocate gender justice.

== See also ==
- Agnivansha
- Draupati Amman
- Yajnaseni, a novel by Pratibha Ray
- Yajnaseni, a play by Suman Pokhrel
- Historicity of the Mahabharata
