= Yajnaseni (play) =

Nepali play by Suman Pokhrel

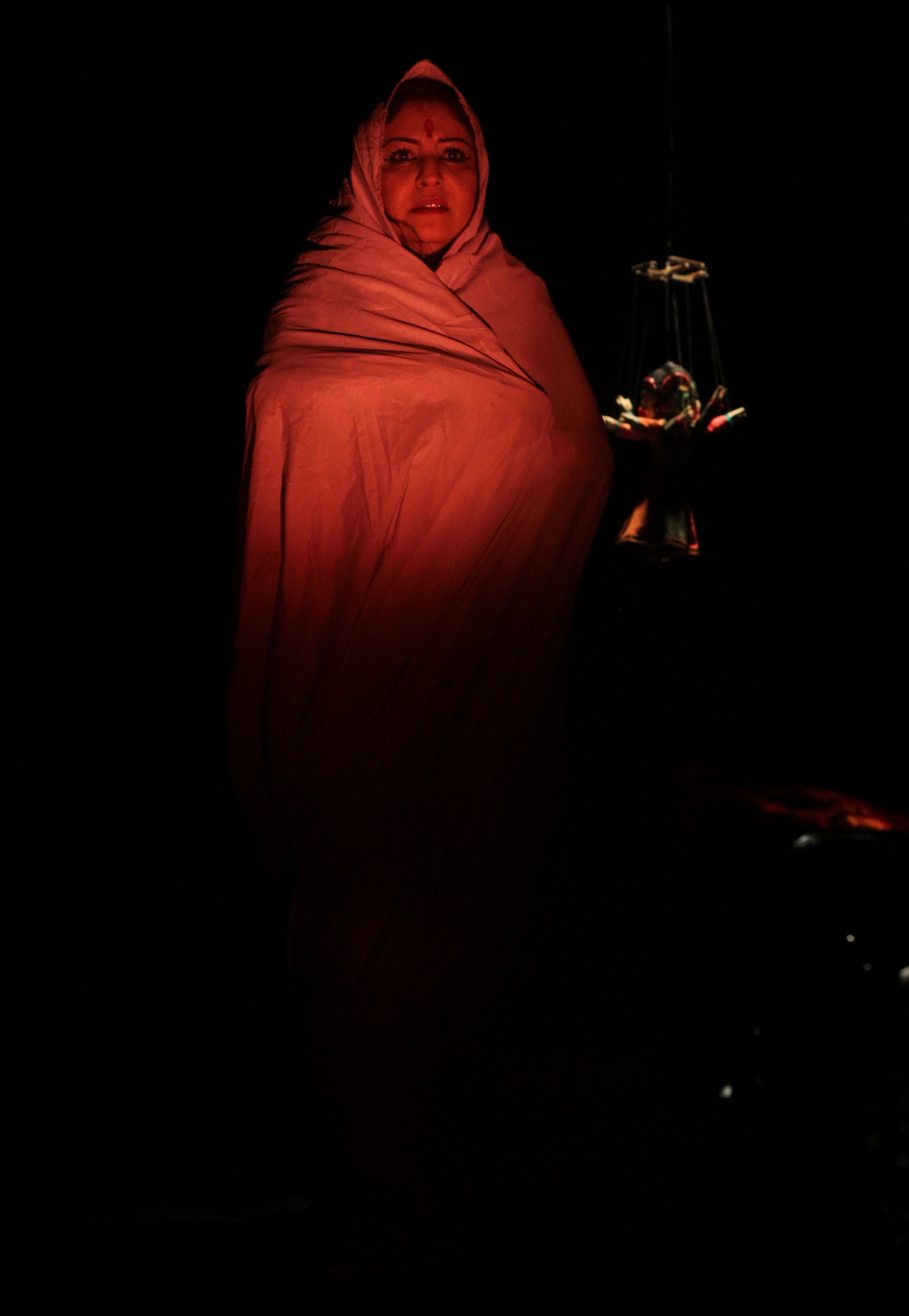
- Nisha Sharma performing as Yajanseni in the play 'Yajnaseni'
- Original language: Nepali
- Written by: Suman Pokhrel
- Based on: The Mahabharata and Yajnaseni
- Characters: Yajnaseni
- Subject: Marriage, Womanhood, Property, War, Politics
- Genre: Epic theatre
- Setting: Panchal, Hastinapur, Indraprastha and Kurukshetra

Premiere
- Date: 2 October 2016
- Place: Irving Arts Center, Dallas, Texas, United States
- yajnaseni at Theatricalia.com

Yajnaseni (Nepali: ne:याज्ञसेनी) is a play in Nepali by Suman Pokhrel. The play is based on the Sanskrit epic The Mahabharata and Odia novel Yajnaseni by Pratibha Ray. This play has been staged in Nepal, India and United States.

Suman Pokhrel rendered the story into a solo play in Nepali by bringing the character Yajnaseni alone in the scenes. Pokhrel has personalized the play while maintaining the basic concept of the original story of Draupadi.

The story revolves around Draupadi, who is also known as Yajnaseni and is one of the lead characters from the famous Sanskrit epic Mahabharata. The play is a neo-interpretation of Mahabharata from Yajnaseni's perspective.

Aarohan Theatre Group prepared Yajnaseni for stage show for the first time. It was first performed in Irving Arts Center in Texas, United States, on October 2, 2016, as a premiere show before its two-month long U.S. tour. Sunil Pokharel has directed this play and Nisha Sharma performed the role of Yajnaseni on stage.

The play was later performed at Ritwik Sadan in Kalyani, West Bengal in India on 11 January 2017 as a part of 12th Ramdhanu Nattyamela organized by Kalyani Kalamandalam.

Aarohan staged this play at Rastriya Naach Ghar (The National Theater) in Jamal in Kathmandu on November 8, 2019, in association with SAARC Chamber Women Entrepreneurs Council Nepal
