= Acharyasri Rajesh =

Indian spiritual guru and Vedic Educator

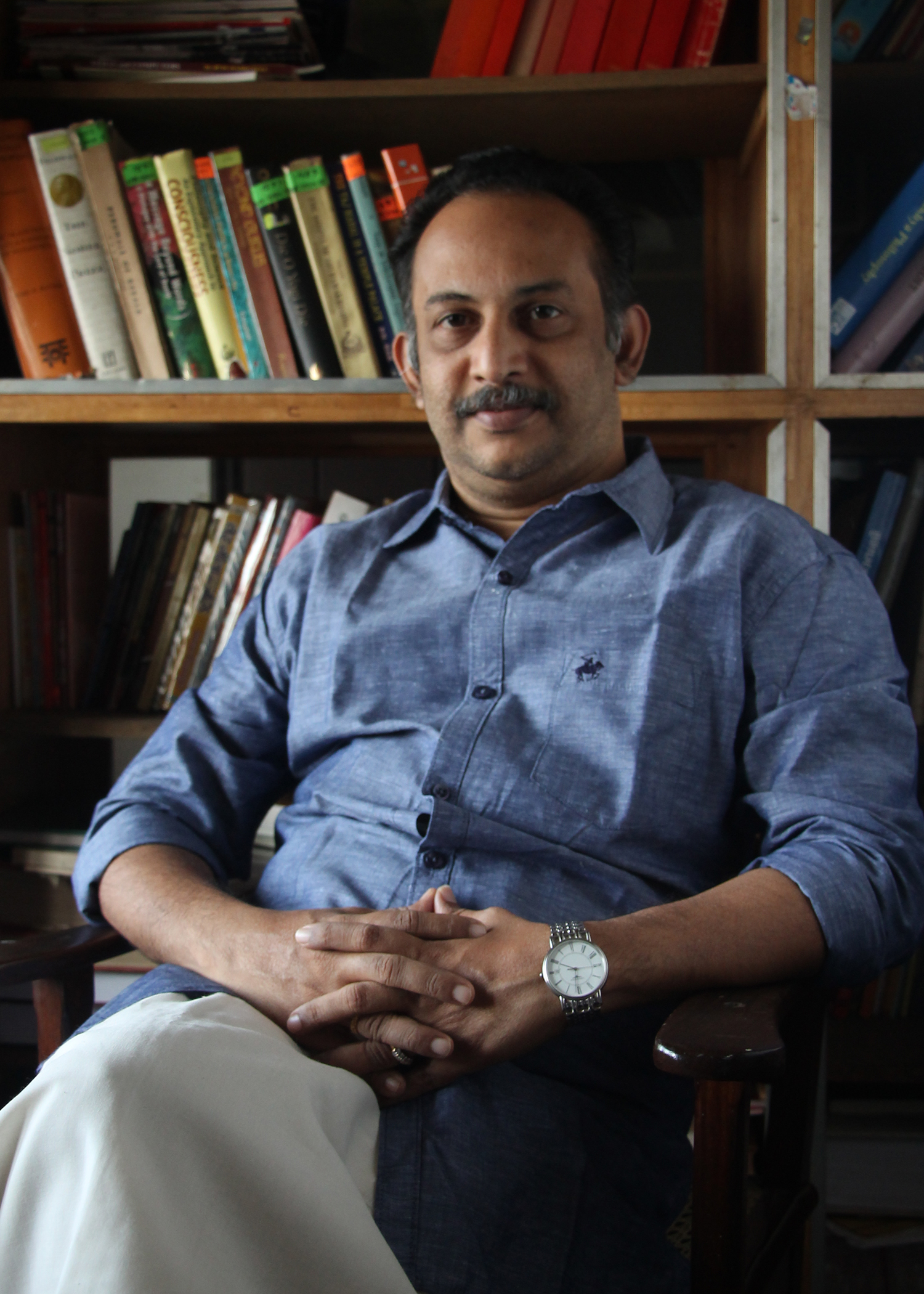
- Born: 31 May 1972 (age 54); Narikkuni, Kozhikode, Kerala, India
- Spouse: Meera Rajesh
- Children: 2
- Parent(s): Subrahmanyan Namboothiri; Komalavalli Antharjanam
- Website: acharyasrirajesh.in

Acharya M. R. Rajesh, (born 31 May 1972), better known as Acharyasri Rajesh is an Indian Spiritual Guru, Vedic Educator, and Author, Founder of World's first Veda temple. As he was born in an orthodox Namboodiri family, he was able to learn Vedas from his father Subramanyan Namboodiri himself. It was from V.S. Harshavardhanan he learnt Vyakarana and Nyaya (Indian logic). Later he joined Acharya Narandra Bhooshan, a renowned Vedic scholar in Kerala, and learnt to interpret Vedas according to the Nirukta, ancient Vedic etymology from him. By pointing out the egalitarian view of the Vedas, he started teaching Vedas and Vedic rituals to all irrespective of caste, creed, or gender. For the propagation of Vedas, he founded Kasyapa Veda Research Foundation, a charitable trust, headquartered at Kozhikode, Kerala.

== Kozhikode Somayagam 2014 ==
Rajesh organised the first Somayagam in Kerala in 2014 where all sections of people irrespective of caste, gender or religion participated. Baba Ramdev inaugurated the Somayagam, which was attended by nearly 13 Lakh people.

== Prajnanam Brahma ==
In the event of 'Prajnanam Brahma', more than 1.5 lakhs of people including the disciples of Rajesh and people leading a Vedic way of Life gathered at Calicut beach in April 2016, upholding the Slogan "God is knowledge, Knowledge for all". The proclamation "Right on Vedas" was made byRajesh in this mega event, in which he declared to the world that everyone has right to learn Vedas and Observe vedic rituals without any discrimination of caste or religion. For the first time in the history of Kerala, a woman was declared as the Vedic priest. 2500 Women chanted Vedic mantras harmoniously in "Prajnanam Brahma".According to Dr.Varma (Vice President Sarvadeshik Arya Pratinidhi Sabha) "Prajnanam Brahma" was a milestone in the social and cultural history of Kerala.
