= K. S. Radhakrishnan =

Indian scholar, writer, philosopher and politician

Dr. K. S. Radhakrishnan
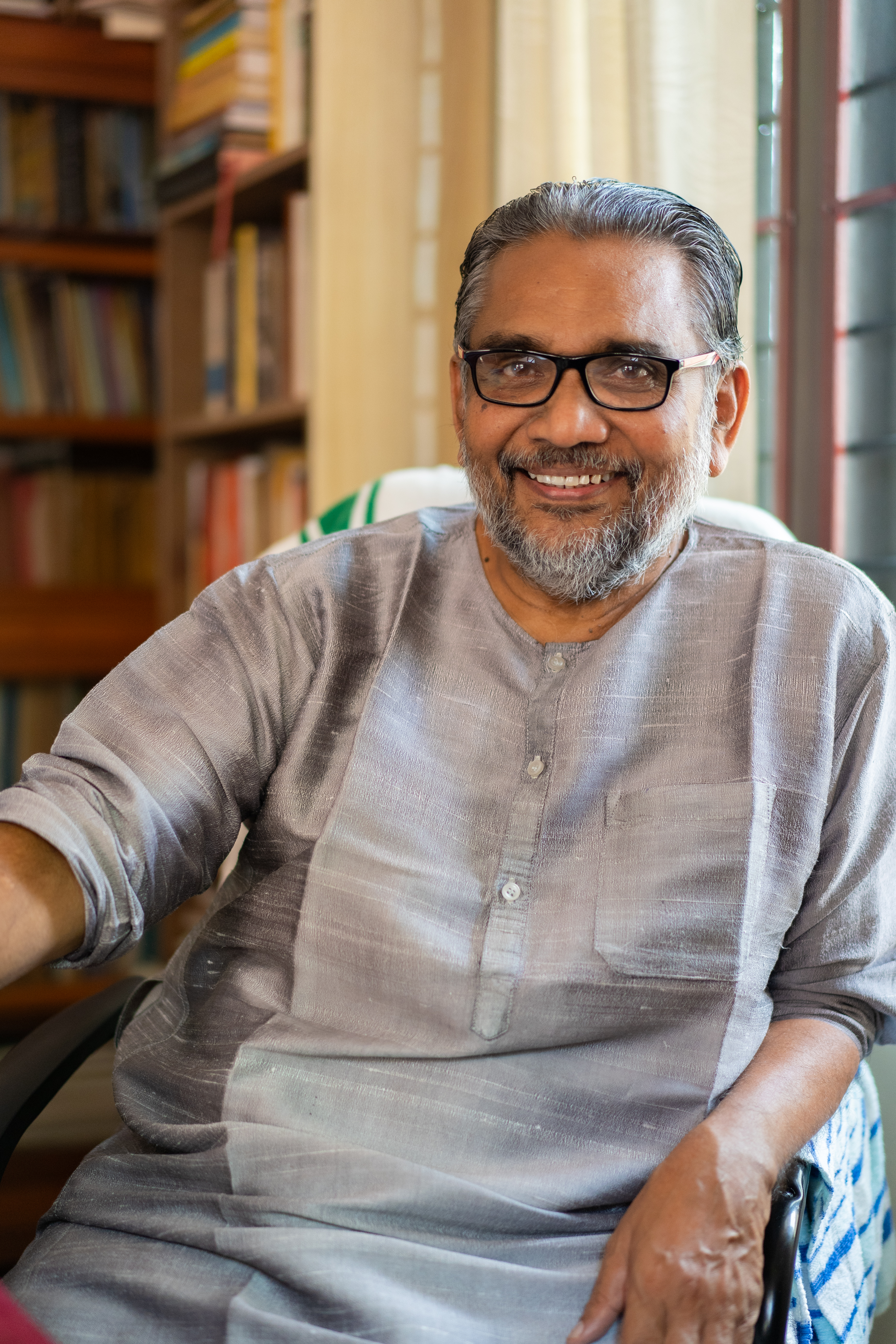

Personal details
- Party: Bharatiya Janata Party
- Spouse: Sreekumari K. S.
- Children: 2
- Education: Maharaja's College, Ernakulam

Dr. K. S. Radhakrishnan is an Indian scholar, writer, philosopher, and politician. He is currently the state vice-president of the Bharatiya Janatha Party (BJP) in Kerala.

Radhakrishnan formerly served as the Chairman of the Kerala Public Service Commission. Prior to that, he was the Vice Chancellor of Sree Sankaracharya University of Sanskrit, Kalady from 2004 to 2008.

== Education and career ==
Born in Ernakulam, he was educated at the Maharaja's College, Ernakulam, receiving his B.A. and M.A. in philosophy. He later obtained a Ph.D. in Advaita Vedanta from Calicut University in 1994.

Radhakrishnan specializes in Advaita System, Gandhian Studies and Philosophy of Science. He was a member of the governing body of Indian Council of Philosophical Research, New Delhi from 2006 to 2009.

== Awards and honors ==
- 2023 Smruthi Govindam award for his contribution to Indic thoughts.
- 2023 Amrita Keerti Puraskar for his lifetime contributions to Vedic philosophy and culture.
- 2018 Future Kerala Educational Excellence award.

== Books ==
- Introduction to Indian Jurisprudence. Amrita Books, 2025.
- Ramayanam Manushyakathaanugaanam. Mathrubhumi Books, 2022.
- Epistemology and Aesthetics of the Mahabharata. Indus Scrolls Press, 2022.
- Mahabharata Vicharangal. Mathrubhumi Printing and Publishing, 2021.
- Love Jihad in the Quran. Indus Scrolls Press, 2021.
- Islam Janadhipathya Samoohathil. Kurukshethra Prakasan, 2017.
- Kristhudharsanam. Kerala Sahitya Akademi, 2015.
- Gandhi - Sree Narayana Guru. DC Books, 2013.
