= P. Narayana Kurup =

Indian poet (1934–2026)

- Born: 5 September 1934; Haripad, Travancore, India
- Died: 20 June 2026 (aged 91); Kerala, India
- Occupations: Poet; Critic
- Awards: Amrita Keerti Puraskar (2005); Vallathol Award (2014); Padma Shri (2022)

P. Narayana Kurup (5 September 1934 – 20 June 2026) was an Indian Malayalam–language poet and literary critic from Kerala state, South India.

== Background ==
Kurup was brought up in an ethos of music and temple art in his native village Haripad, Kerala. He took his degree in Science and Education from University College, Trivandrum and masters in English with distinction while serving in Central Ministry at Delhi. In addition to poetry, he authored several significant works on satire, criticism and travel memoirs, among others. He also chaired and helmed the operations of Thapasya (Forum for Art and Literature) and Margi (Centre for Classical Art) and was considered a connoisseur and critic of Kathakali and Koodiyattam. He was awarded India's fourth highest civilian award Padma Shri in January 2022.

Kurup died on 20 June 2026, at the age of 91.

== Positions held ==
Kurup was deputed as research officer to the Language Institute, Trivandrum and served as Consulting Editor in Encyclopedic Publication of the Kerala Government and Assistant Editor and Editor in Publications Division, New Delhi. He was the editor of two encyclopedias published by D.C. Books (from 1985 to 1988). He was the governing body member of Kerala Kala Mandalam from 1986 to 1992. He was a trustee of Bharat Bhavan in Bhopal from 2004 to 2010. He had also held the position of Vice-President (All India) of Sanskar Bharati, Agra from 2000 to 2004. He was also a member of film advisory committee from 2002 to 2008. He was re-appointed to the committee in 2015 and held membership in the film advisory committee until his death.

=== Major contributions ===
Kurup was a member of the judging committee of Door Darshan Kendra at Delhi and in Trivandrum station. He was an expert member in Veda-Vyasa Brahma Vidya Peeth, Quilon Kerala. He was the patron of Thapasya (Forum for Art and Literature) after having been its president for 10 years. He was a member in Executive Committee of Margi (Centre for Classical Art). He was also the Vice President of Irayimman Thampi Smaraka Trust and Chairman of N. V. Krishna Warrier Smaraka Samithi.

== Awards and achievements ==
- Padma Shri in January 2022
- Kerala Sahitya Akademi Award for Poetry in 1991
- Kerala Sahitya Akademi Award for Literary Criticism in 1986
- Odakkuzhal Award from Guruvayurappan Trust for poetry in 1990
- State Children's Literature Award
- Ulloor Award in 2002 for Poetry
- Amrita Keerti Puraskar in 2005.
- Janmashtami Award from Balagokulam in 2012
- Sanjayan Award in 2015
- Vallathol Award in 2014
- Kerala Panini Puraskaram

== Published works ==
(I) POETRY
Sl No	Poetry Title	Year	Publisher
1	Astramalyam	1969	NBS Kottayam
2	Kurumkavita	1970	NBS Kottayam
3	Apoornathayude Soundaryam	1977	NBS Kottayam
4	Naranathu Kavitha	1979	NBS Kottayam
5	Hamsadhwani	1988, 1990	NBS Kottayam
6	Bhupalam	1986	NBS Kottayam
7	Nishagandhi	1990, 2000	NBS Kottayam
8	Kimputer	1997	Current Books
9	Ammathottam	2001	NBS Kottayam
10	Syamasundaran	2007	NBS Kottayam
11	Samam Sangharsham	2004	Rainbow Books
12	Vakkile Sakunthala	2010	NBS Kottayam
13	Dasha-pushpam	2010	Prabhath Books

(II) CRITICAL ESSAYS AND STUDIES
Sl No	Title	Year	Publisher
1	Smapoorna Viplavam	1977	Navadhara Publishers
2	Black Money	1962	N.B.S
3	Unnayi Warrier (English)	1997	Sahitya Akademi
4	Kaviyum Kavithayum	1969, 1980 & 2004	NBS, Language Institute
5	Thiranottam	2010	Priya Darsini Publications

(III) PROSODY (published by Language Institute)
Sl. No	Title	Year
1	Vritha padanam	1992, 1998
2	Kavitayile Realism	1993
3	Kavya Bimbam in Hindi and Malayalam	1988

(IV) TRAVELOGUE AND BIOGRAPHY
SL. No	Title	Year	Publisher
1	Ishwarante Naadu (on Himalayas)	1972	DC Books
2	Jawaharlal Nehru	1990	DC Books

(V) CHILDREN'S LITERATURE
SL. No	Title	Year	Publisher
1	Kadalasu Kappal	1962	NBS Kottayam
2	Vikkaranum Chakkaranum	1975	D C Books
3	Pantu Pantu	1987	Navadhara Publications
4	Thenichakkadu	1990	Publications Division New Delhi
5	Kolappan Pandi Thattan	2001	Bala Sahitya Institute Trivandrum
6	Nattu Kathakal	2009	Poorna Publication House
7	Kantappan Kelappan	2010	CSN Books, Trivandrum
