= Jashn =

Jashn is a Middle Persian and Modern Persian form of the Avestan word yasna (lit. '[act of] worship'), which involves fire-ritual in Zoroastrianism and is akin to yajna in Hinduism. The Hindi-Urdu word Jashn (lit. 'festival') derives from this.

Jashn may refer to:

- Jashn (2009 film), an Indian Hindi musical romance
- Jashn (album), a 1996 ghazal album by Indian artist Hariharan

== See also ==
- Yagam (disambiguation)
- Jashn-e-Adab, cultural festival in India
- Jashn-e-Baharan, spring festival in the Indian calendar
- Jashn-e-Chiragah, variant of Diwali in Mughal India
- Jashn-e-Rekhta, Urdu literary festival in India
- "Jashn-e-Bahara", a song from the 2008 Indian film Jodhaa Akbar
