= Acharya Narendra Bhooshan =

Vedic and Sanskrit Scholar (1937–2010)

(Acharya) Narendra Bhooshan

Personal life
- Born: 22 May 1937 Chengannur
- Died: 16 November 2010 (aged 73) Kochi

(Acharya) Narendra Bhooshan (Acharyaji) was an Indian linguist, scholar, orator, writer, translator, journalist and publisher. He was a scholar in Sanskrit, Malayalam, Hindi and English.

== Published works ==
He is author of "Chathurveda Samhitha", transcriptions of the entire chants and mantras of the four Vedas in the Malayalam alphabet along with a profound commentary, along with original Devanagari script. Acharya Narendra Bhooshan's commentaries on all major Upanishads are proof of his profound knowledge in that sphere. These commentaries are in Malayalam. His interpretation (in Malayalam) of 10 major Upanishads are compiled as Dashopanishad Shruthipriya Bhasha Bhayam He has also done Lokamanya Tilak's "Geetha Rahasyam" Justice Ganga prasad's Origin of Religions "Mathangalute Uthbhavakatha", Swamy Sathyapathi Parivrajaka's "Yogameemamsa" into Malayalam. "Yogameemamsa" explain the true meaning of Yoga dispelling all superstitions of about the practice of Yaga. The contribution of Swami Dayananda Saraswati and Arya samaj were made familiar to the people of Kerala mainly through Acharya's work of "Sathyartha Prakasham" which was originally written in Hindi. Other work in Sanskrit by Swami Dayananda Saraswathy like, "Veda Paryatanam", "Vedageethamrutham" "Achara Bhanu" "Aryabhivinayam" "Aryodhesha Ratnamala" were brought into Malayalam by Acharya Narendra Bhushan. Another very important- work is a commentary on "Harinama Keerthanam" explaining the Upanishad and Vedic dimensions of this Keerthanam. "Mahamrithumjayam" is another work by the author. "Upasana" is another Malayalam work by Acharya Narendra Bhooshan giving in details the Pancha Mahayajna's to be practical in daily life.

He has also contributed to the field of literature by translating BHASA's famous Sanskrit dramas "Abhisheka" and "Ooru Bhanga" to Malayalam. The Malayalam work Yogesweranaya Sree Krishna gives a picture of the life Sreekrishna as a Yogi. "Ayodhyayile Sree Raman" is yet another work that render proof for the author's mind "Yaga Parichayam" is a work in Malayalam that attempts to give details regarding the Yaga. Another book "Paralokavum Punarjanmavum" serves is a book on Acharya Narendra Bhooshan's thoughts on vedic tradition, religion and spirituality.

== Awards and honours ==
Another award, the first Amrita Keerthi Puraskaram (award) was also bestowed to Acharya Narendra Bhooshan. He also received Veda Ratna award in 2007 from Kashyapa Veda Research Institute, Kozhikode, Kerala. He was entrusted by the Kerala state language institute to prepare the history of the three reformation movements of the 19th century, the Arya Samaj, the Brahma Samaj and Prarthana Samaj.
