= Pratibha Ray =

Indian Odia writer

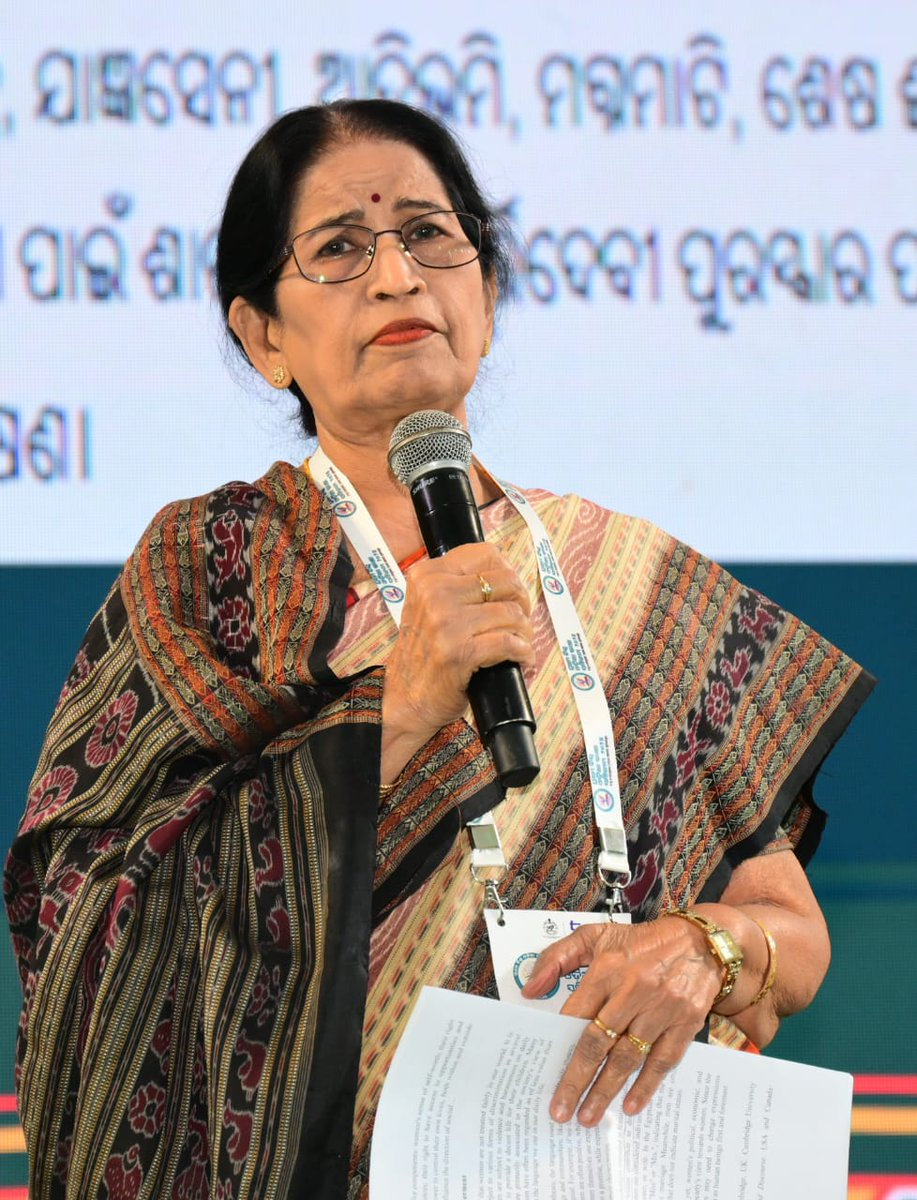
- Born: 21 January 1944 (age 82); Alabol, Balikuda, Jagatsinghpur, Odisha, India
- Education: M.A. (Education), PhD (Educational Psychology)
- Alma mater: Ravenshaw College
- Spouse: Akshaya Chandra Ray
- Children: 3
- Parent(s): Parshuram Das (father); Manorama Devi (mother)
- Writing career
- Language: Odia
- Notable works: Yajnaseni, Shilapadma
- Notable awards: Jnanpith Award; Moortidevi Award
- Website: pratibharay.org

Pratibha Ray (born 21 January 1944) is an Indian academic and writer of Odia-language novels and stories. For her contribution to the Indian literature, Ray received the Jnanpith Award in 2011. She was awarded the Padma Bhushan in 2022.

== Life and career ==
She was born on 21 January 1944 in a Vaishnav Karan family at Alabol, a remote village in the Balikuda area of Jagatsinghpur district formerly part of Cuttack district of Odisha state. She was the first woman to win the Moortidevi Award in 1991. Her first novel Barsha Basanta Baishakha (1974) was a best seller.

Her search for a "social order based on equality, love, peace and integration", continues, since she first penned at the age of nine. When she wrote for a social order, based on equality without class, caste, religion or sex discriminations, some of her critics branded her as a communist, and some as feminist. But she says: "I am a humanist. Men and women have been created differently for the healthy functioning of society. The specialities women have been endowed with should be nurtured further. As a human being, however, woman is equal to man."

She continued her writing career even after her marriage and raising a family of three children and husband Akshay Ray who is an engineer. Her post-doctoral research was on Tribalism and Criminology of Bondo Highlander, tribes of Odisha, India.

She started her professional career as a school teacher, and later she taught in various government colleges in Odisha for thirty years. She has guided doctoral research and has published many research articles. She took voluntary retirement as a Professor of Education from State Government Service and joined as Member, Public Service Commission of Odisha.

She has active interest in social reform and has fought against social injustice on many occasions. One important incident in her life is protesting against colour (caste/religion) discrimination by the high priests of Jagannath Temple at Puri. She is currently fighting a defamation case lodged by the priests against her for her newspaper article in which she wrote against the undesirable behaviour of the priests, titled "The Colour of Religion is Black" (Dharmara Ranga Kala). She works in the cyclone-affected areas after the Odisha's Super Cyclone of October 1999 and she is working for rehabilitation of the orphans and widows of Cyclone affected areas.

== Travel ==
Ray has travelled extensively inside India to participate in various national literary and educational conferences. She visited five republics of the erstwhile USSR in 1986 in a cultural exchange programme sponsored by ISCUS. She represented India as an Indian writer in the India Fair in Australia, "India Today 94". sponsored by Indian Council for Cultural Relations, New Delhi, in 1994. She gave readings and talks on Indian literature and languages in several universities of Australia. She has also visited the US, UK and France on speaking tours, represented India as an Indian writer in the India Festival in Bangladesh in 1996, and attended the 7th International Interdisciplinary Congress on Women in the University of Tromsø, Norway, in June 1999 as an Indian delegate. She visited Norway, Sweden, Finland and Denmark on a speaking tour in 1999. Visited Zurich, Switzerland, in 2000 to present a paper in the Third European Conference on Gender Equality in Higher Education.

== Memberships ==
She is a member of a number of learned societies. She is connected with the Indian Council for Cultural Relations, Central Board of Film Certification, Indian Red Cross Society, India International Centre, National Book Trust of India, Central Academy of Letters etc. She has travelled extensively in India and abroad to participate in various literary and educational conferences. She has won a number of national and state awards for her creative writing.

== Selected works ==
Novels

- Barsa Basanta Baishakha, 1974
- Aranya, 1977
- Nishiddha Prithivi, 1978
- Parichaya, 1979
- Aparichita, 1979. (A film was made & won Best Film-Story award from Odisha State Govt., Department of Culture)
- Punyatoya the story of village girl Meghi, 1979. (Tr. To Hindi)
- Meghamedura, 1980
- Ashabari, 1980
- Ayamarambha, 1981
- Nilatrishna, 1981. (Tr. to Hindi)
- Samudrara Swara, 1982. (Tr. to Hindi)
- Shilapadma, 1983. (Odisha Sahitya Academy Award, 1985; Tr. to Assamese, Hindi, Marathi, Malayalam, Punjabi and English)
- Yajnaseni, 1984 (Moorti Devi Award, 1991 and Sarala Award, 1990. Tr. to English, Hindi, Malayalam, Marathi, Assamese, Bengali, Gujarati, Hungarian)
- Dehatita, 1986
- Uttaramarg, 1988. (Tr. to Hindi & Punjabi)
- Adibhumi (Tr. to Hindi & English)
- Mahamoha, 1998 (To be published in Hindi, Bengali & Malayalam)
- Magnamati, 2004
- Maharani Putra, 2008

Travelogue

- Maitripadapara Shakha Prashakha (USSR), 1990
- Dura Dwividha (UK, France), 1999
- Aparadhira Sweda (Australia), 2000

Short Stories

- Samanya Kathana – 1978
- Gangashiuli – 1979
- Asamapta – 1980
- Aikatana – 1981
- Anabana – 1983
- Hatabaksa – 1983
- Ghasa O Akasa
- Chandrabhaga O Chandrakala – 1984
- Shrestha Galpa – 1984
- Abyakta (made into a Telefilm) – 1986
- Itibut – 1987
- Haripatra – 1989
- Prthak Isvara – 1991
- Bhagavanara Desa – 1991
- Manushya Swara – 1992
- Sva-nirvachita SreshthaGalpa – 1994
- Sashthasati – 1996
- Moksha (made into a Feature Film, that received the Best Regional Film award) – 1996
- Ullaghna (Sahitya Akademi Award, 2000) – 1998
- Nivedanam Idam – 2000
- Gandhinka – 2002
- Jhotipaka Kantha – 2006

== Adaptations ==
- Yajnaseni (play) – Suman Pokhrel has rendered Ray's novel Yajnaseni as a solo play in Nepali.

== Awards and recognition ==
- 1985 – Odisha Sahitya Academi Award' for the novel Sheelapadma
- 1990 – 'Sarala Award' for the novel Yajnaseni
- 1991 – 'Moortidevi Award' for the Novel Yajnaseni
- 2000 – 'Sahitya Akademi Award' for the Short-Story Collection Ullaghna
- 2006 – Amrita Keerti Puraskar
- 2007 – 'Padma Shri Award' in Literature and Education by the Government of India.
- 2011 – 'Jnanpith Award'
- 2013 – Odisha Living Legend Award (Literature)
- 2022 - Padma Bhushan from Government of India for literature and education
- 2022 - Viswambhara Dr C Narayana Reddy National Literary Award

== See also ==
- List of Indian writers
- List of Sahitya Akademi Award winners for Odia
- Pratibha Satpathy
