= Yajnaseni (novel) =

1984 novel by Pratibha Ray

- English language version published 1 September 1995 by Rupa Publishers
- Author: Pratibha Ray
- Language: Odia
- Genre: Novel
- Publication place: India
- Media type: Print
- Awards: Moortidevi Award 1991(by Jnanpith) Sarala Award

Yajnaseni: the story of Draupadi is a 1984 Odia language novel by Pratibha Ray. The story revolves around Draupadi from the famous epic Mahabharatha. The word Yajnaseni means a woman born out of fire. The book has been translated into various languages, including English, Hindi, Malayalam, Kannada, Marathi, Assamese, Bengali, Nepal, Hungarian and Russian Language

This novel has been rendered into a theatrical play titled "Yajnaseni" in Nepali by Suman Pokhrel.

== Awards ==
- Sarala Award, 1990
- Moortidevi Award, 1991
