= Irving Arts Center =

Coordinates: 32.8504°N 96.9607°W

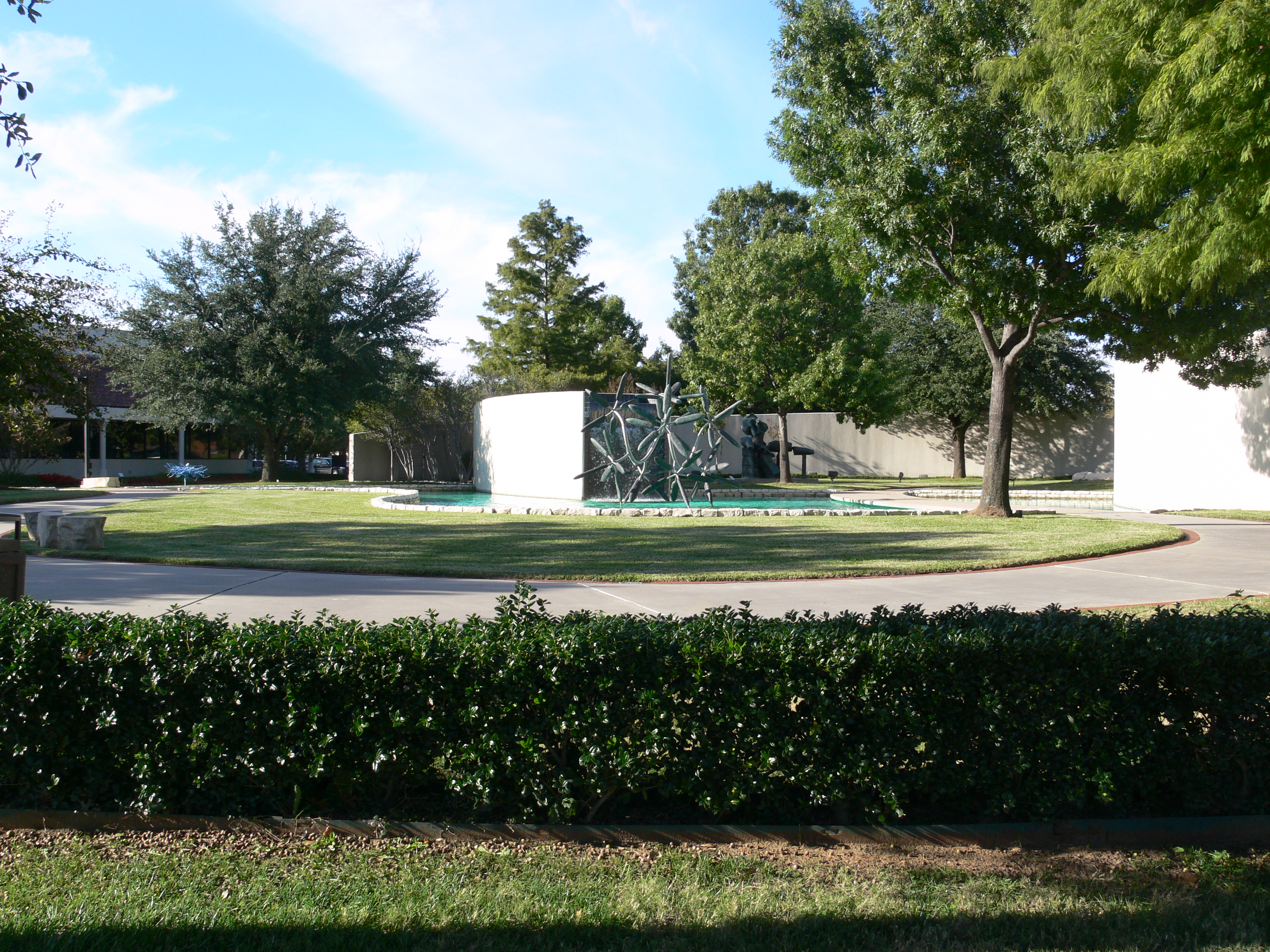
- Established: 1980
- Location: 3333 North MacArthur Blvd; Irving, Texas, United States
- Type: Art Center
- Website: www.irvingartscenter.com

The Irving Arts Center, located in Irving, Texas, is a 10-acre art center that caters to all ages within the community. The center contains over 91,500 square feet of performing and visual arts space which includes a 3,800 square-foot Main Gallery. The Main Gallery host over 20 exhibits throughout the year. In 2007, the art center became an affiliate with the Smithsonian Institution, which makes the Irving Arts Center one out of 160 Smithsonian Affiliates nationwide.

The 10-acre center features theaters, classrooms, reception halls, a sculpture garden and other areas for the community.

Irving Arts Center features four galleries that are free and open to the public. They host a variety of artwork from local and regional artists, along with traveling shows from the Smithsonian Museum and other affiliates around the country.

== History ==
The beginning of the Irving Arts Center started as early as the 1980s when an Irving city art board was created to come up with creative ideas for the community by the city council. The Center was completed sometime in the 1990s.

== Resident Arts Organizations ==
The Irving Art Center is home to eleven cultural organizations. These organizations operate independently from the Irving Art Center Board but use the facility to host activities and events.

The current eleven Resident Arts Organizations are: New Philharmonic Orchestra of Irving, Irving Symphony Orchestra, Las Colinas Symphony Orchestra, Lyric Stage, Irving Symphonic Band, ICT MainStage, Momentum Dance Company, Entertainment Series of Irving, Irving Chorale, Irving Black Arts Council and Irving Art Association.

These organizations are funded by the Residential Arts Fund. The purpose of the fund is to provide the opportunity for organizational assistance support to the resident arts organizations whose efforts brought the Irving Arts Center into existence and which meet the eligibility requirements as established by the Irving Arts Board and the City of Irving.
