= Gusti =

Gusti may refer to:

- Gusti (illustrator), Argentinan illustrator, finalist in 2022 Hans Christian Andersen Award
- Dimitrie Gusti (1880–1955), Romanian sociologist, ethnologist, historian, and philosopher
- Gusti B (born 2001), Icelandic actor, radio host and internet personality
- Gusti Yehoshua Braverman, Israeli activist
- Gusti Huber (1914–1993), Austrian theater and film actress
- Gusti Jordan (1909–1990), French footballer
- Gusti Nurul (1921–2015), Indonesian dancer
- Gusti Ngurah Made Pemecutan (died 1810), King in Badung
- Gusti Sandria (born 1995), Indonesian footballer
- Gusti Wolf (1912–2007), Austrian stage, film, and television actress
- I Gusti Bayu Sutha (born 1977), Indonesian footballer
- I Gusti Ketut Pudja (1908–1977), Indonesian politician
- I Gusti Made Oka Sulaksana (born 1971), Indonesian professional sailor and windsurfer
- I Gusti Ngurah Rai (1917–1946), commanded Indonesian forces in Bali during the War of Independence
- I Gusti Nyoman Lempad (1862–1978), Indonesian stone sculptor and architect
- I Gusti Putu Phalgunadi, Indonesian scholar and translator from Kawi to English
- I Gusti Putu Martha (1913–1992), Indonesian politician

== See also ==
- Gila Gusti, 2022 Malaysian film
- Gusti Grab, a village in Bosnia and Herzegovina
