= Mahabharata =

Ancient smṛti text and Sanskrit epic

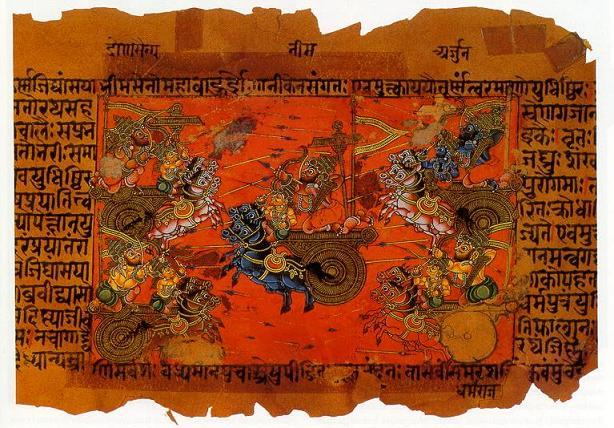
- Manuscript illustration of the Battle of Kurukshetra

Information
- Religion: Hinduism
- Author: Vyasa
- Language: Sanskrit
- Period: Principally compiled in 3rd century BCE – 4th century CE
- Chapters: 18 Parvas
- Verses: 100,000

Full text
- Mahabharata at Sanskrit Wikisource
- Mahabharata at English Wikisource

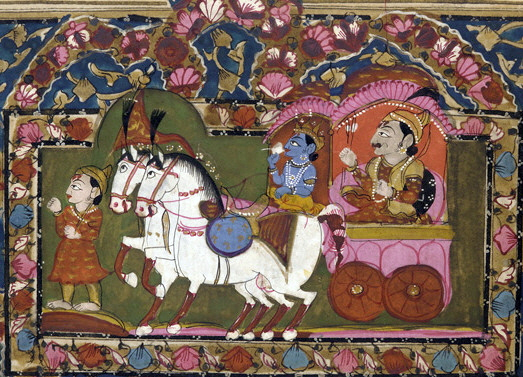
Krishna and Arjuna at Kurukshetra, 18th–19th-century painting

The Mahābhārata (/məˌhɑːˈbɑːrətə, ˌmɑːhə-/ mə-HAH-BAR-ə-tə, MAH-hə-; Sanskrit: महाभारतम्, IAST: Mahābhāratam, pronounced [mɐɦaːˈbʱaːrɐt̪ɐm], 'Great Bharata') is one of the two major Sanskrit epics of ancient India revered in Hinduism, the other being the Ramayana. Both are considered smṛti and itihasa texts. The Mahābhārata narrates the events around the Kurukshetra War, while also discussing philosophical concepts, such as the four "goals of life" or puruṣārtha. A principal element of the Mahābhārata is the Bhagavad Gita, which is a prominent sacred text in Hindu traditions.

The Mahābhārata recounts the events of the dynastic struggle for the throne of Hastinapura, that leads to the battle of Kurukshetra, a war of succession between princely cousins, the Kauravas and the Pāṇḍavas. The multiple stories in the Mahābhārata include the story of Damayanti, Shakuntala, Pururava and Urvashi, Savitri and Satyavan, Kacha and Devayani, Rishyasringa and an abbreviated version of the Rāmāyaṇa. The epic theorizes about dharmayuddha, "just war", and the Bhagavad Gita discusses the Vedic concept of dharma (duty, rightful action) in a dialogue between the Pandava prince Arjuna and his charioteer guide Krishna.

Traditionally, the authorship of the Mahābhārata is attributed to Vyāsa. There have been many attempts to unravel its historical growth and compositional layers. The bulk of the Mahābhārata was probably compiled between the 3rd century BCE and the 3rd century CE, with the oldest preserved parts not much older than around 400 BCE. The text probably reached its final form by the early Gupta period (c. 4th century CE).

The title is translated as "Great Bharat (India)", or "the story of the great descendants of Bharata", or as "The Great Indian Tale". The Mahābhārata is one of the longest epic poems known. Its longest version consists of over 100,000 shlokas (verses) or over 200,000 individual lines (each shloka is a couplet), and long prose passages. At about 1.8 million words in total, the Mahābhārata is roughly ten times the length of the Iliad and the Odyssey combined, or about four times the length of the Rāmāyaṇa, albeit more than 2.5 times shorter than the world's longest poem, The Epic of Manas. Within the Indian tradition it is sometimes called the fifth Veda.

== Textual history and structure ==
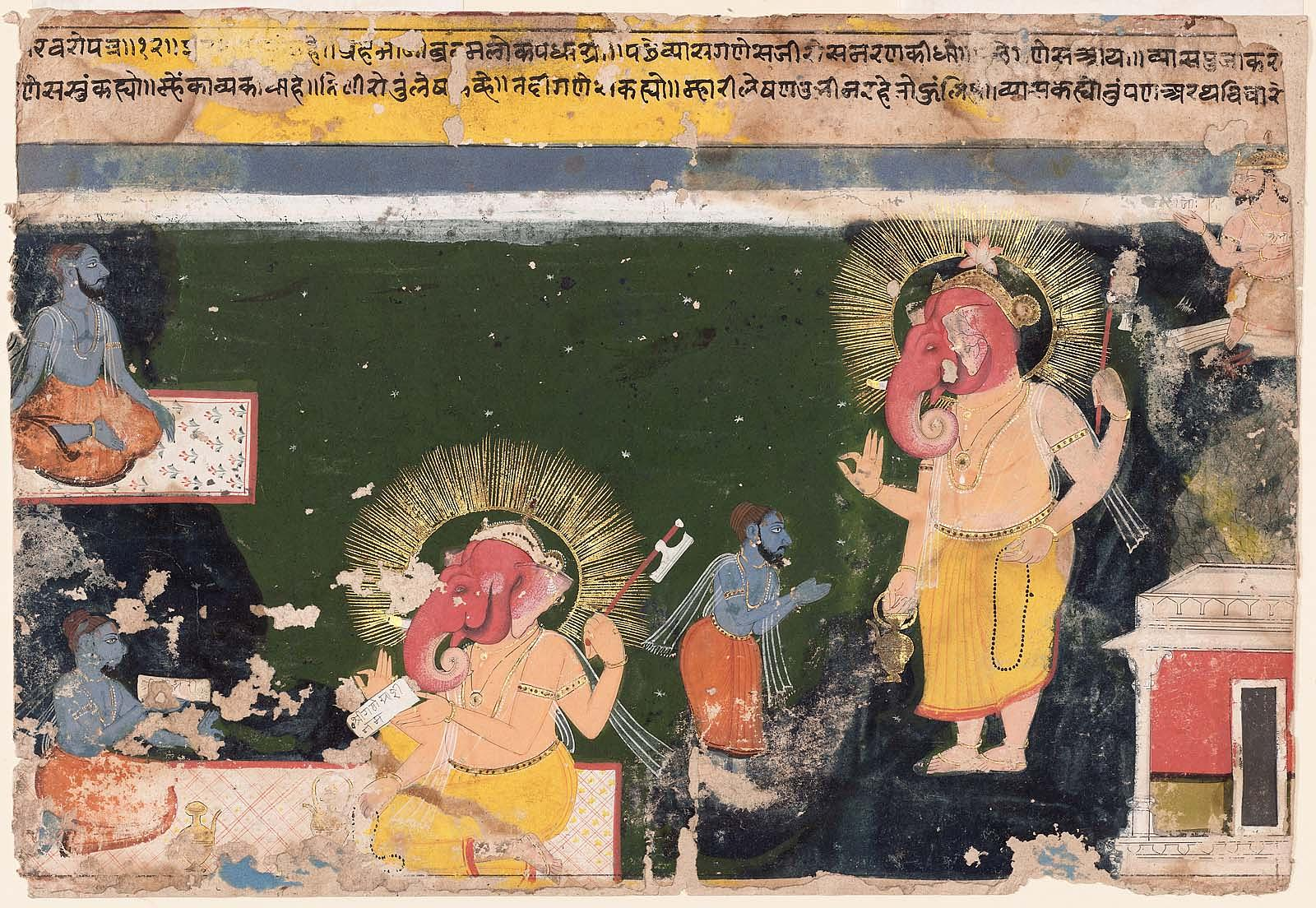
Vyasa narrating the Mahābhārata to Ganesha from a 17th century Mewar manuscript.

The epic is traditionally ascribed to the sage Vyasa, who is also a major figure in the epic. Vyasa described it as being an itihasa (transl. history). He also describes the Guru–shishya tradition, which traces all great teachers and their students of the Vedic times.

The first section of the Mahābhārata states that it was Ganesha who wrote down the text to Vyasa's dictation, but this is regarded by scholars as a later interpolation to the epic and the "Critical Edition" does not include Ganesha.

The epic employs the story within a story structure, otherwise known as frametales, popular in many Indian religious and non-religious works. It is first recited at the city of Taxila by the sage Vaisampayana, a disciple of Vyasa, to the King Janamejaya who was the great-grandson of the Pandava prince Arjuna. Many years later, the story is recited again by a professional storyteller named Ugrashrava Sauti to an assemblage of sages conducting a twelve-year sacrifice for King Saunaka Kulapati in the Naimisha Forest.

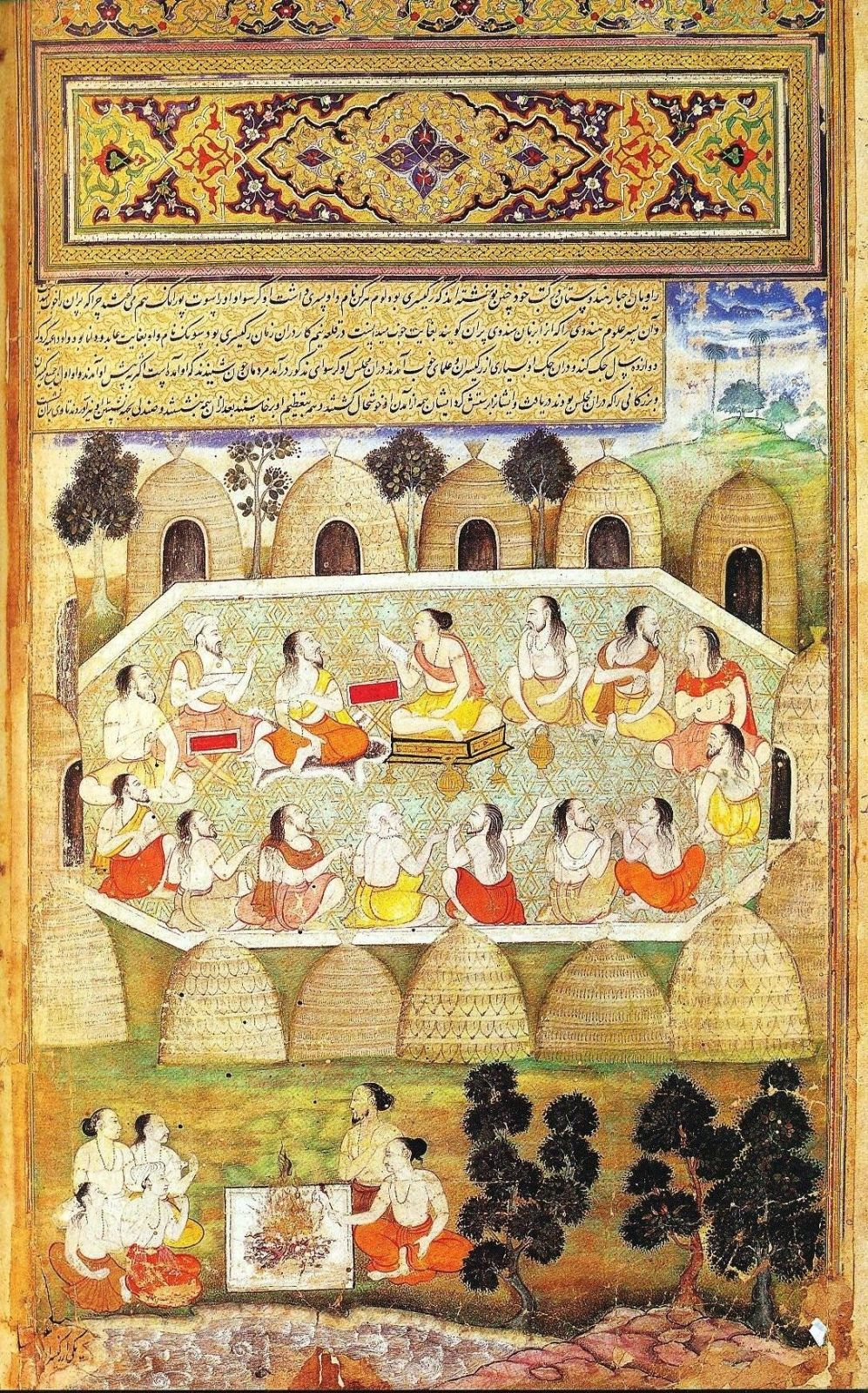
Sauti recites the slokas of the Mahabharata.

The text was described by some early 20th-century Indologists as unstructured and chaotic. Hermann Oldenberg supposed that the original poem must once have carried an immense "tragic force" but dismissed the full text as a "horrible chaos." Moritz Winternitz (Geschichte der indischen Literatur 1909) considered that "only unpoetical theologists and clumsy scribes" could have lumped the parts of disparate origin into an unordered whole.

Malinar writes that the narrative framings in the Mahabharata reveal the purpose behind the philosophical teachings. At the same time, the philosophical teachings also serve a narrative purpose. For example, in chapter 12.211, the philosophical teaching helps narrate King Janaka's transformation.

=== Accretion and redaction ===
Research on the Mahābhārata has put an enormous effort into recognizing and dating layers within the text. Some elements of the present Mahabharata can be traced back to Vedic times. The background to the Mahābhārata suggests the origin of the epic occurs "after the very early Vedic period" and before "the first Indian 'empire' was to rise in the third century B.C." That this is "a date not too far removed from the 8th or 9th century B.C." is likely. The Mahabharata started as an orally-transmitted tale of the charioteer bards. It is generally agreed that "Unlike the Vedas, which have to be preserved letter-perfect, the epic was a popular work whose reciters would inevitably conform to changes in language and style," so the earliest 'surviving' components of this dynamic text are believed to be no older than the earliest 'external' references we have to the epic, which include a reference in Panini's 4th century BCE grammar Ashtadhyayi 4:2:56. Vishnu Sukthankar, editor of the first great critical edition of the Mahābhārata, commented: "It is useless to think of reconstructing a fluid text in an original shape, based on an archetype and a stemma codicum. What then is possible? Our objective can only be to reconstruct the oldest form of the text which it is possible to reach based on the manuscript material available." That manuscript evidence is somewhat late, given its material composition and the climate of India, but it is very extensive.

The Mahābhārata itself (1.1.61) distinguishes a core portion of 24,000 verses: the Bhārata proper, as opposed to additional secondary material, while the Ashvalayana Grihyasutra (3.4.4) makes a similar distinction. At least three redactions of the text are commonly recognized: Jaya (Victory) with 8,800 verses attributed to Vyasa, the Bharata with 24,000 verses as recited by Vaisampayana, and finally the Mahābhārata as recited by Ugrashrava Sauti with over 100,000 verses. However, some scholars, such as John Brockington, argue that Jaya and Bharata refer to the same text, and ascribe the theory of Jaya with 8,800 verses to a misreading of a verse in the Adi Parva (1.1.81). The redaction of this large body of text was carried out after formal principles, emphasizing the numbers 18 and 12. The addition of the latest parts may be dated by the absence of the Anushasana Parva and the Virata Parva from the "Spitzer manuscript". The oldest surviving Sanskrit text dates to the Kushan Period (200 CE).

According to what one figure says at Mbh. 1.1.50, there were three versions of the epic, beginning with Manu (1.1.27), Astika (1.3, sub-Parva 5), or Vasu (1.57), respectively. These versions would correspond to the addition of one and then another 'frame' settings of dialogues. The Vasu version would omit the frame settings and begin with the account of the birth of Vyasa. The astika version would add the sarpasattra and ashvamedha material from Brahmanical literature, introduce the name Mahābhārata, and identify Vyasa as the work's author. The redactors of these additions were probably Pancharatrin scholars who according to Oberlies (1998) likely retained control over the text until its final redaction. Mention of the Huna in the Bhishma Parva however appears to imply that this Parva may have been edited around the 4th century.

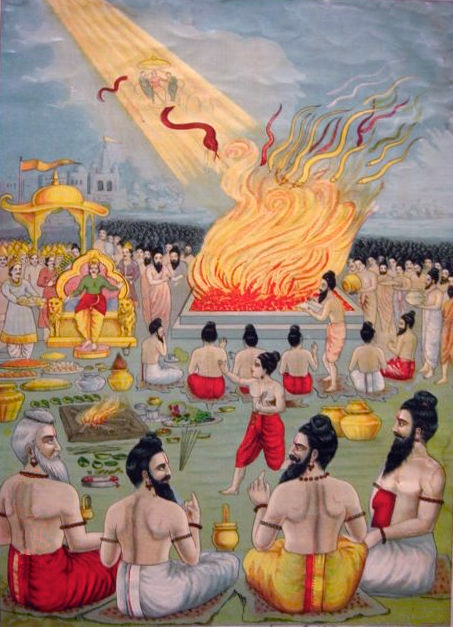
The snake sacrifice of Janamejaya

The Adi Parva includes the snake sacrifice (sarpasattra) of Janamejaya, explaining its motivation, detailing why all snakes in existence were intended to be destroyed, and why despite this, there are still snakes in existence. This sarpasattra material was often considered an independent tale added to a version of the Mahābhārata by "thematic attraction" (Minkowski 1991), and considered to have a particularly close connection to Vedic (Brahmana) literature. The Panchavimsha Brahmana (at 25.15.3) enumerates the officiant priests of a sarpasattra among whom the names Dhritarashtra and Janamejaya, two main figures of the Mahābhārata's sarpasattra, as well as Takshaka, a snake in the Mahābhārata, occur.

The Suparnakhyana, a late Vedic period poem considered to be among the "earliest traces of epic poetry in India," is an older, shorter precursor to the expanded legend of Garuda that is included in the Astika Parva, within the Adi Parva of the Mahābhārata.

==== UNESCO recognition ====
In November 2026, a 400-year old birch bark manuscript of the Mahabharata, which is housed at the Bhandarkar Oriental Research Institute(BORI), located in Pune, was included in UNESCO's Memory of the World Asia-Pacific Regional Register. It was written in the Sharada script, thereby serving as one of the important textual traditions of the epic.

=== Historical references ===
The earliest known references to bhārata and the compound mahābhārata date to the Ashtadhyayi (sutra 6.2.38) of Panini (fl. 4th century BCE) and the Ashvalayana Grihyasutra (3.4.4). This may mean that the core 24,000 verses, known as the Bhārata, as well as an early version of the extended Mahābhārata, were composed by the 4th century BCE. However, it is uncertain whether Panini referred to the epic, as bhārata was also used to describe other things. Albrecht Weber mentions the Rigvedic tribe of the Bharatas, where a great person might have been designated as Mahā-Bhārata. However, as Panini also mentions figures that play a role in the Mahābhārata, some parts of the epic may have already been known in his day. Another aspect is that Panini determined the accent of mahā-bhārata. However, the Mahābhārata was not recited in Vedic accent.

The Greek writer Dio Chrysostom (c. 40 – c. 120 CE) reported that Homer's poetry was being sung even in India. Many scholars have taken this as evidence for the existence of a Māhabhārata at this date, whose episodes Dio or his sources identify with the story of the Iliad.

Several stories within the Mahābhārata took on separate identities of their own in Classical Sanskrit literature. For instance, the Abhijnanashakuntala by the Sanskrit poet Kalidasa (c. 400 CE), believed to have lived in the era of the Gupta dynasty, is based on a story that is the precursor to the Mahābhārata. The Urubhanga, a Sanskrit play written by Bhasa who is believed to have lived before Kalidasa, is based on the slaying of Duryodhana by the splitting of his thighs by Bhima.

The copper-plate inscription of the Maharaja Sharvanatha (533–534 CE) from Khoh (Satna District, Madhya Pradesh) describes the Mahābhārata as a "collection of 100,000 verses" (śata-sahasri saṃhitā).

=== The 18 parvas or books ===
The division into 18 parvas is as follows:

Parva	Title	Sub-parvas	Contents
1	Adi Parva (The Book of the Beginning)	1–19	How the Mahābhārata came to be narrated by Sauti to the assembled rishis at Naimisharanya, after having been recited at the sarpasattra of Janamejaya by Vaisampayana at Takshashila. The history and genealogy of the Bharata and Bhrigu races are recalled, as is the birth and early life of the Kuru princes (adi means first). Adi parva describes Pandavas' birth, childhood, education, marriage, struggles due to conspiracy as well as glorious achievements.
2	Sabha Parva (The Book of the Assembly Hall)	20–28	Maya Danava erects the palace and court (sabha) at Indraprastha. The Sabha Parva narrates the glorious Yudhisthira's Rajasuya sacrifice performed with the help of his brothers and Yudhisthira's rule in Shakraprastha/Indraprastha as well as the humiliation and deceit caused by conspiracy along with their own action.
3	Vana Parva also Aranyaka Parva, Aranya Parva (The Book of the Forest)	29–44	The twelve years of exile in the forest (aranya). The entire Parva describes their struggle and consolidation of strength.
4	Virata Parva (The Book of Virata)	45–48	The year spent incognito at the court of Virata. A single warrior (Arjuna) defeated the entire Kuru army including Karna, Bhishma, Drona, Ashwatthama, etc. and recovered the cattle of the Virata kingdom.
5	Udyoga Parva (The Book of the Effort)	49–59	Preparations for war and efforts to bring about peace between the Kaurava and the Pandava sides which eventually fail (udyoga means effort or work).
6	Bhishma Parva (The Book of Bhishma)	60–64	The first part of the great battle, with Bhishma as commander for the Kaurava and his fall on the bed of arrows. The most important aspect of Bhishma Parva is the Bhagavad Gita narrated by Krishna to Arjuna. (Includes the Bhagavad Gita in chapters 25–42.)
7	Drona Parva (The Book of Drona)	65–72	The battle continues, with Drona as commander. This is the major book of the war. Most of the great warriors on both sides are dead by the end of this book.
8	Karna Parva (The Book of Karna)	73	The continuation of the battle with Karna as commander of the Kaurava forces.
9	Shalya Parva (The Book of Shalya)	74–77	The last day of the battle, with Shalya as commander. Also told in detail, is the pilgrimage of Balarama to the fords of the river Saraswati and the mace fight between Bhima and Duryodhana which ends the war, since Bhima kills Duryodhana by smashing him on the thighs with a mace.
10	Sauptika Parva (The Book of the Sleeping Warriors)	78–80	Ashwatthama, Kripa and Kritavarma kill the remaining Pandava army in their sleep. Only seven warriors remain on the Pandava side and three on the Kaurava side.
11	Stri Parva (The Book of the Women)	81–85	Gandhari and the women (stri) of the Kauravas and Pandavas lament the dead and Gandhari cursing Krishna for the massive destruction and the extermination of the Kaurava.
12	Shanti Parva (The Book of Peace)	86–88	The crowning of Yudhishthira as king of Hastinapura, and instructions from Bhishma for the newly anointed king on society, economics, and politics. This is the longest book of the Mahābhārata.
13	Anushasana Parva (The Book of the Instructions)	89–90	The final instructions (anushasana) from Bhishma. This Parva contains the last day of Bhishma and his advice and wisdom to the upcoming emperor Yudhishthira.
14	Ashvamedhika Parva (The Book of the Horse Sacrifice)	91–92	The royal ceremony of the Ashvamedha (Horse sacrifice) conducted by Yudhishthira. The world conquest by Arjuna. Anugita is told by Krishna to Arjuna.
15	Ashramavasika Parva (The Book of the Hermitage)	93–95	The eventual deaths of Dhritarashtra, Gandhari, and Kunti in a forest fire when they are living in a hermitage in the Himalayas. Vidura predeceases them and Sanjaya on Dhritarashtra's bidding goes to live in the higher Himalayas.
16	Mausala Parva (The Book of the Clubs)	96	The materialization of Gandhari's curse, i.e., the infighting between the Yadavas with maces (mausala) and the eventual destruction of the Yadavas.
17	Mahaprasthanika Parva (The Book of the Great Journey)	97	The great journey of Yudhishthira, his brothers, and his wife Draupadi across the whole country and finally their ascent of the great Himalayas where each Pandava falls except for Yudhishthira.
18	Svargarohana Parva (The Book of the Ascent to Heaven)	98	Yudhishthira's final test and the return of the Pandavas to the spiritual world (svarga).
khila	Harivamsa Parva (The Book of the Genealogy of Hari)	99–100	This is an addendum to the 18 books, and covers those parts of the life of Krishna which is not covered in the 18 parvas of the Mahābhārata.

== Historical context ==
The historicity of the Kurukshetra War is unclear. Many historians estimate the date of the Kurukshetra war to Iron Age India of the 10th century BCE. The setting of the epic has a historical precedent in Iron Age (Vedic) India, where the Kuru kingdom was the center of political power during roughly 1200 to 800 BCE. A dynastic conflict of the period could have been the inspiration for the Jaya, the foundation on which the Mahābhārata corpus was built, with a climactic battle, eventually coming to be viewed as an epochal event.

Puranic literature presents genealogical lists associated with the Mahābhārata narrative. The evidence of the Puranas is of two kinds. Of the first kind, there is the direct statement that there were 1,015 (or 1,050) years between the birth of Parikshit (Arjuna's grandson) and the accession of Mahapadma Nanda (400–329 BCE), which would yield an estimate of about 1400 BCE for the Bharata battle. However, this would imply improbably long reigns on average for the kings listed in the genealogies. Of the second kind is analysis of parallel genealogies in the Puranas between the times of Adhisimakrishna (Parikshit's great-grandson) and Mahapadma Nanda. Pargiter accordingly estimated 26 generations by averaging 10 different dynastic lists and, assuming 18 years for the average duration of a reign, arrived at an estimate of 850 BCE for Adhisimakrishna, and thus approximately 950 BCE for the Bharata battle.

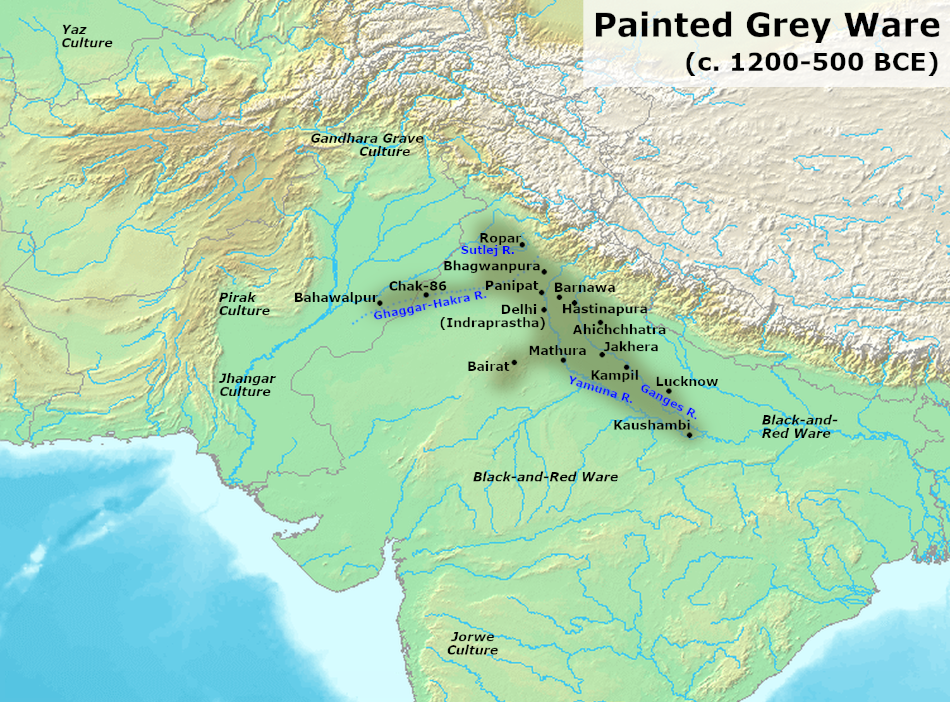
Map of some Painted Grey Ware (PGW) sites.

B. B. Lal used the same approach with a more conservative assumption of the average reign to estimate a date of 836 BCE, and correlated this with archaeological evidence from Painted Grey Ware (PGW) sites, the association being strong between PGW artifacts and places mentioned in the epic. John Keay suggests "their core narratives seem to relate to events from a period prior to all but the Rig Veda."

Attempts to date the events using methods of archaeoastronomy have produced, depending on which passages are chosen and how they are interpreted, estimates ranging from the late 4th to the mid-2nd millennium BCE. The late 4th-millennium date has a precedent in the calculation of the Kali Yuga epoch, based on planetary conjunctions, by Aryabhata (6th century). Aryabhata's date of 18 February 3102 BCE for Mahābhārata war has become widespread in Indian tradition. Some sources mark this as the disappearance of Krishna from the Earth. The Aihole inscription of Pulakeshin II, dated to Saka 556 = 634 CE, claims that 3,735 years have elapsed since the Bhārata battle, putting the date of Mahābhārata war at 3137 BCE.

Another traditional school of astronomers and historians, represented by Vrddha Garga, Varāhamihira and Kalhana, place the Bharata war 653 years after the Kali Yuga epoch, corresponding to 2449 BCE. According to Varāhamihira's Bṛhat Saṃhitā (6th century), Yudhishthara lived 2,526 years before the beginning of the Shaka era, which begins in the 78 CE. This places Yudhishthara (and therefore, the Mahabharata war) around 2448–2449 BCE (2526–78). Some scholars have attempted to identify the "Shaka" calendar era mentioned by Varāhamihira with other eras, but such identifications place Varāhamihira in the first century BCE, which is impossible as he refers to the 5th century astronomer Aryabhata. Kalhana's Rajatarangini (11th century), apparently relying on Varāhamihira, also states that the Pandavas flourished 653 years after the beginning of the Kali Yuga; Kalhana adds that people who believe that the Bharata war was fought at the end of the Dvapara Yuga are foolish.

Sanskrit and Mahābhārata scholar Robert P. Goldman states:

(The Mahābhārata) cloaks itself in mythology, but I don't think the text itself should be called a myth...it's an itihasa but in the terms that the tradition understood history. It is a kāvya, obviously, it is a shastra, and it is a teaching method for how to live in the world - how to respect your elders, how to respect the brahmins, and so on. So in answer to the question "Is it history or mythology?" I would say yes, it is both of those things, and a great deal more.

== Synopsis ==
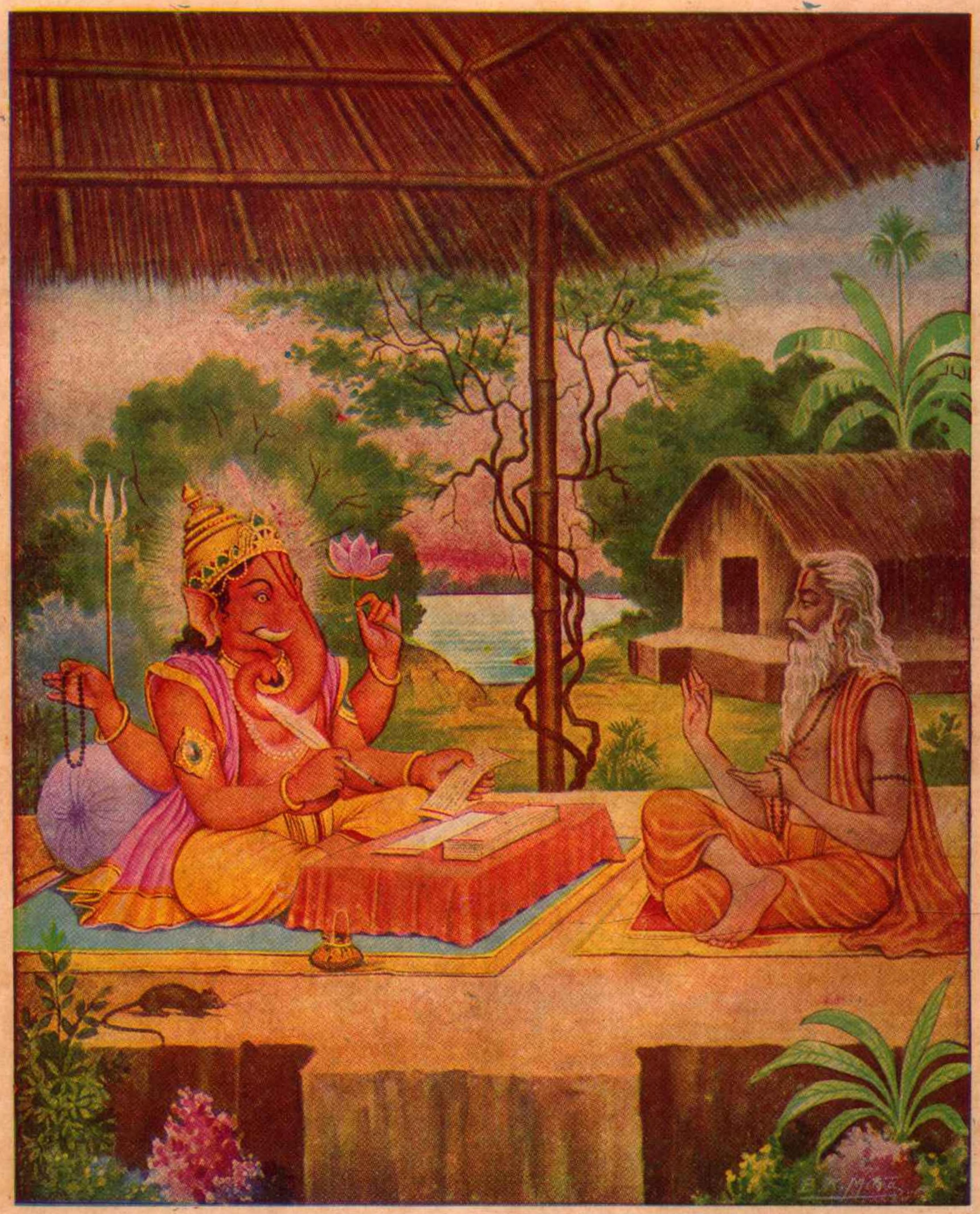
Ganesha writes the Mahabharata upon Vyasa's dictation.

The core story of the work is that of a dynastic struggle for the throne of Hastinapura, the kingdom ruled by the Kuru clan. The two collateral branches of the family that participate in the struggle are the Kaurava and the Pandava. Although the Kaurava is the senior branch of the family, Duryodhana, the eldest Kaurava, is younger than Yudhishthira, the eldest Pandava. Both Duryodhana and Yudhishthira claim to be first in line to inherit the throne.

The struggle culminates in the Kurukshetra War, in which the Pandavas are ultimately victorious. The battle gives rise to complex conflicts of kinship and friendship, as familial loyalty and duty repeatedly clash with, at times take precedence over, and sometimes yields to what is right.

The Mahābhārata ends with the death of Krishna, the subsequent end of his dynasty, and ascent of the Pandava brothers to heaven. It also marks the beginning of the Hindu age of Kali Yuga, the fourth and final age of humankind, in which noble ideas gradually decline, leading to the erosion of righteous action, morality, and virtue.

=== The older generations ===
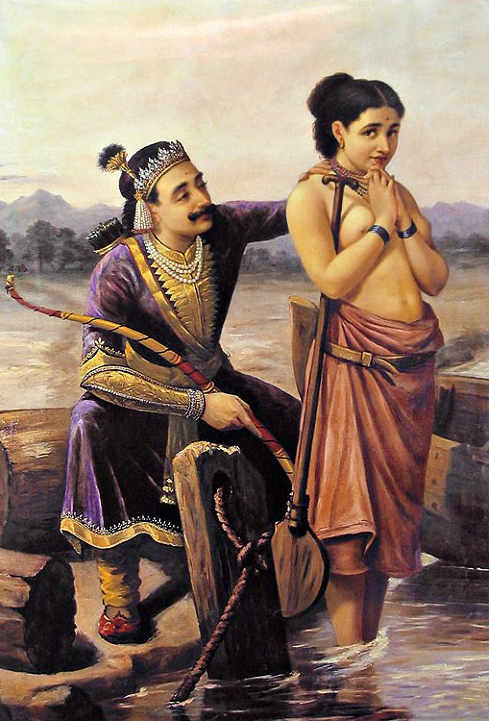
Shantanu falls in love with Satyavati, the fisherwoman. Painting by Raja Ravi Varma.

King Janamejaya's ancestor, Shantanu, the king of Hastinapura, had a short-lived marriage with the goddess Ganga and had a son, Devavrata (later to be called Bhishma, a great warrior), who becomes the heir apparent. Many years later, when King Shantanu goes hunting, he sees Satyavati, the daughter of the chief of fishermen, and asks her father for her hand. Her father refuses to consent to the marriage unless Shantanu promises to make any future son of Satyavati the king upon his death. To resolve his father's dilemma, Devavrata agrees to relinquish his right to the throne. As the fisherman is not sure about the prince's children honoring the promise, Devavrata also takes a vow of lifelong celibacy to guarantee his father's promise.

Shantanu has two sons by Satyavati, Chitrāngada and Vichitravirya. Upon Shantanu's death, Chitrangada becomes king. He lives a very short uneventful life and dies. Vichitravirya, the younger son, rules Hastinapura. Meanwhile, the King of Kāśī arranges a swayamvara for his three daughters, neglecting to invite the royal family of Hastinapura. To arrange the marriage of young Vichitravirya, Bhishma attends the swayamvara of the three princesses Amba, Ambika, and Ambalika, uninvited, and proceeds to abduct them. Ambika and Ambalika consent to be married to Vichitravirya.

The oldest princess Amba, however, informs Bhishma that she wishes to marry the king of Shalva whom Bhishma defeated at their swayamvara. Bhishma lets her leave to marry the king of Shalva, but Shalva refuses to marry her, still smarting at his humiliation at the hands of Bhishma. Amba then returns to marry Bhishma but he refuses due to his vow of celibacy. Amba becomes enraged and becomes Bhishma's bitter enemy, holding him responsible for her plight. She vows to kill him in her next life. Later she is reborn to King Drupada as Shikhandi (or Shikhandini) and causes Bhishma's fall, with the help of Arjuna, in the battle of Kurukshetra.

=== The Pandava and Kaurava princes ===
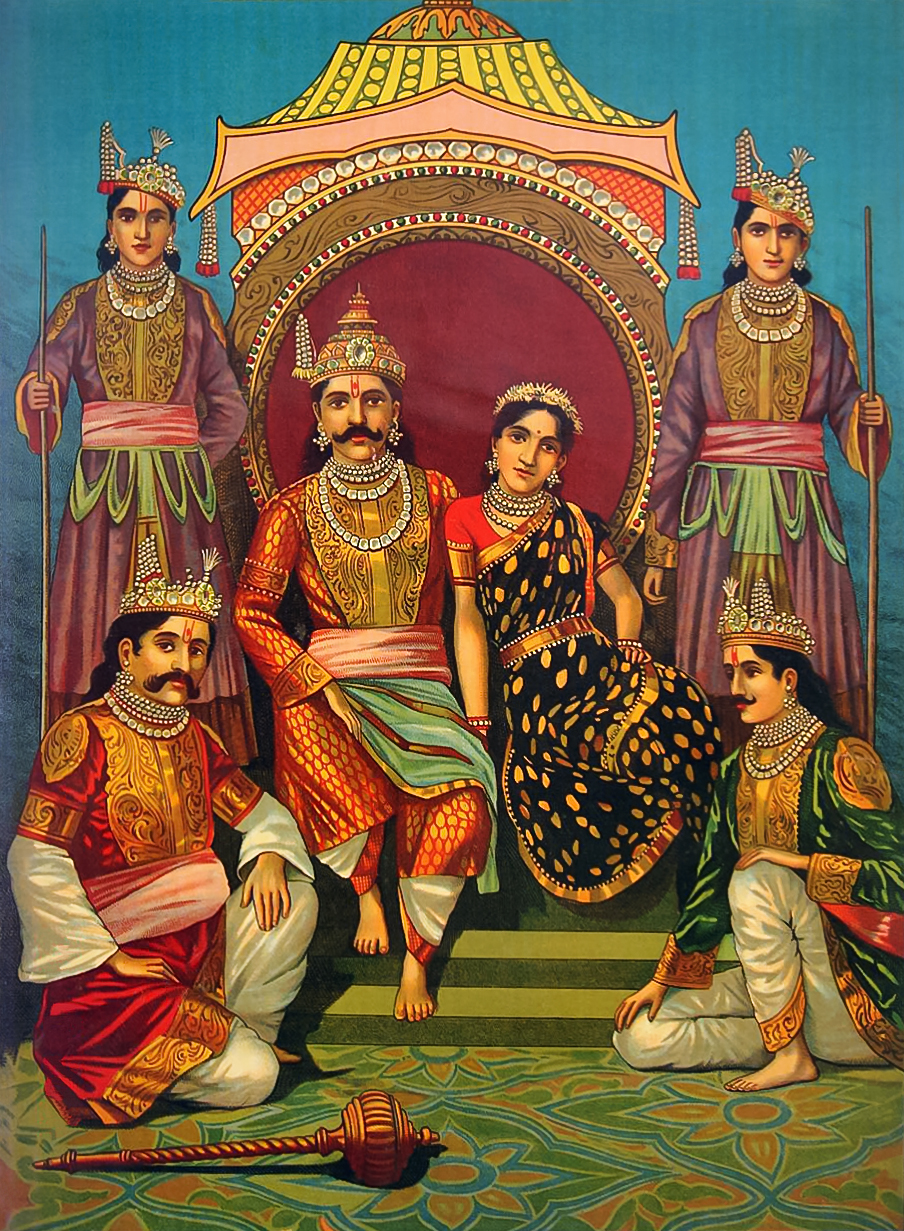
Draupadi with her five husbands – the Pandavas. The central figure is Yudhishthira; the two on the bottom are Bhima and Arjuna. Nakula and Sahadeva, the twins, are standing. Painting by Raja Ravi Varma, c. 1900.

When Vichitravirya dies young without any heirs, Satyavati asks her first son Vyasa, born to her from a previous union with the sage Parashara, to father children with the widows. Vyasa was a renunciate and had unkempt look in ochre robes and long beard. The eldest princess, Ambika, got scared looking at Vyasa and shuts her eyes when she sees him. So her son Dhritarashtra is born blind. Ambalika, the second princess, turns pale and bloodless upon seeing Vyasa, and thus her son Pandu is born pale and unhealthy (the term Pandu may also mean 'jaundiced'). Due to the physical challenges of the first two children, Satyavati asks Vyasa to try once again. However, Princesses Ambika and Ambalika send their maid instead, to Vyasa. This maid, unlike the princesses, is reverential towards the sage. Through this maid, Vyasa fathers a third son, Vidura, who is born healthy and grows up to be one of the wisest figures in the Mahābhārata. He serves as Prime Minister (Mahamantri or Mahatma) to King Pandu and King Dhritarashtra.

When the princes grow up, Dhritarashtra is about to be crowned king by Bhishma when Vidura intervenes and uses his knowledge of politics to assert that a blind person cannot be king. This is because a blind man cannot control and protect his subjects. The throne is then given to Pandu because of Dhritarashtra's blindness. Pandu marries twice, to Kunti and Madri. Dhritarashtra marries Gandhari, a princess from Gandhara, who blindfolds herself for the rest of her life so that she may feel the pain that her husband feels. Her brother Shakuni is enraged by this and vows to take revenge on the Kuru family. One day, when Pandu is relaxing in the forest, he hears the sound of a wild animal. He shoots an arrow in the direction of the sound. However, the arrow hits the sage Kindama, who was engaged in a sexual act in the guise of a deer. He curses Pandu that if he engages in a sexual act, he will die. Pandu is dejected and shares about this curse with his older queen, Kunti.

Kunti, however, had been given a boon by Sage Durvasa that she could invoke any god using a special mantra. Kunti uses this boon to ask Dharma, the god of justice, Vayu, the god of the wind, and Indra, the lord of the heavens for sons. She gives birth to three sons, Yudhishthira, Bhima, and Arjuna, through these gods. Kunti shares her mantra with the younger queen Madri, who bears the twins Nakula and Sahadeva through the Ashwini twins. However, Pandu and Madri indulge in lovemaking, and Pandu dies. Madri commits suicide out of remorse. Kunti raises the five brothers, who are from then on usually referred to as the Pandava brothers.

After Pandu's death, his brother, Dhritarashtra rules the kingdom of Hastinapur, despite his blindness. He has a hundred sons, and one daughter—Duhsala—through Gandhari, all born after the birth of Yudhishthira. These are the Kaurava brothers, the eldest being Duryodhana, and the second Dushasana. Other Kaurava brothers include Vikarna and Sukarna. The rivalry and enmity between them and the Pandava brothers, from their youth and into manhood, leads to the Kurukshetra war.

=== Lakshagraha (the house of lac) ===
After the deaths of their mother (Madri) and father (Pandu), the Pandavas and their mother Kunti return to the palace of Hastinapur. Yudhishthira is made Crown Prince by Dhritarashtra, under considerable pressure from his courtiers.

Shakuni, Duryodhana, and Dushasana plot to get rid of the Pandavas. Shakuni calls the architect Purochana to build a palace out of flammable materials like lac and ghee. He then arranges for the Pandavas and the Queen Mother Kunti to stay there, intending to set it alight. However, the Pandavas are warned by their wise uncle, Vidura, who sends them a miner to dig a tunnel. They escape to safety through the tunnel and go into hiding. During this time, Bhima marries a demoness Hidimbi and has a son Ghatotkacha. Back in Hastinapur, the Pandavas and Kunti are presumed dead.

=== Marriage to Draupadi ===
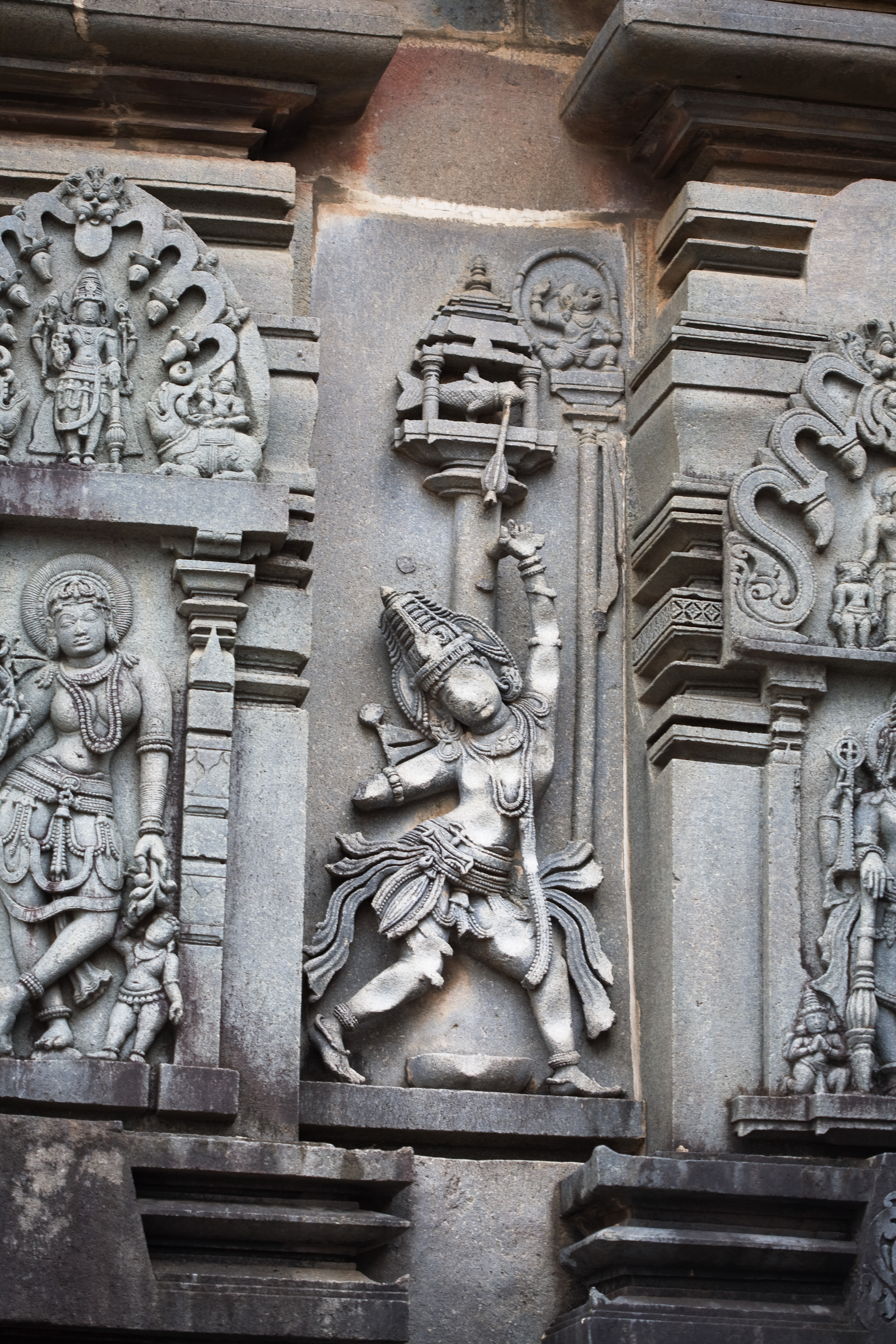
Arjuna piercing the eye of the fish as depicted in Chennakeshava Temple, Belur built by Hoysala Empire

Whilst they were in hiding, the Pandavas learn of a swayamvara which is taking place for the hand of the Pāñcāla princess Draupadī. The Pandavas, disguised as Brahmins, come to witness the event. Meanwhile, Krishna, who has already befriended Draupadi, tells her to look out for Arjuna (though now believed to be dead). The task was to string a mighty steel bow and shoot a target on the ceiling, which was the eye of a moving artificial fish, while looking at its reflection in oil below. In popular versions, after all the princes fail, many being unable to lift the bow, Karna proceeds to the attempt but is interrupted by Draupadi who refuses to marry a suta (this has been excised from the Critical Edition of Mahabharata as later interpolation). After this, the swayamvara is opened to the Brahmins leading Arjuna to win the contest and marry Draupadi. The Pandavas return home and inform their meditating mother that Arjuna has won a competition and to look at what they have brought back. Without looking, Kunti asks them to share whatever Arjuna has won amongst themselves, thinking it to be alms. Thus, Draupadi ends up being the wife of all five brothers.

=== Indraprastha ===
After the wedding, the Pandava brothers are invited back to Hastinapura. The Kuru family elders and relatives negotiate and broker a split of the kingdom, with the Pandavas demanding and obtaining only a wild forest inhabited by Takshaka, the king of snakes, and his family. Through hard work, the Pandavas build a new glorious capital for the territory at Indraprastha.

Shortly after this, Arjuna elopes with and then marries Krishna's sister, Subhadra. Yudhishthira wishes to establish his position as king; he seeks Krishna's advice. Krishna advises him, and after due preparation and the elimination of some opposition, Yudhishthira carries out the rājasūya yagna ceremony; he is thus recognized as pre-eminent among kings.

The Pandavas have a new palace built for them, by Maya the Danava. They invite their Kaurava cousins to Indraprastha. Duryodhana walks round the palace, and mistakes a glossy floor for water, and will not step in. After being told of his error, he then sees a pond and assumes it is not water and falls in. Bhima, Arjuna, the twins and the servants laugh at him. In popular adaptations, this insult is wrongly attributed to Draupadi, even though in the Sanskrit epic, it was the Pandavas (except Yudhishthira) who had insulted Duryodhana. Enraged by the insult, and jealous at seeing the wealth of the Pandavas, Duryodhana decides to host a dice-game on Shakuni's suggestion. This suggestion was accepted by Yudhisthira despite the rest of the Pandavas advising him not to play.

=== The dice game ===
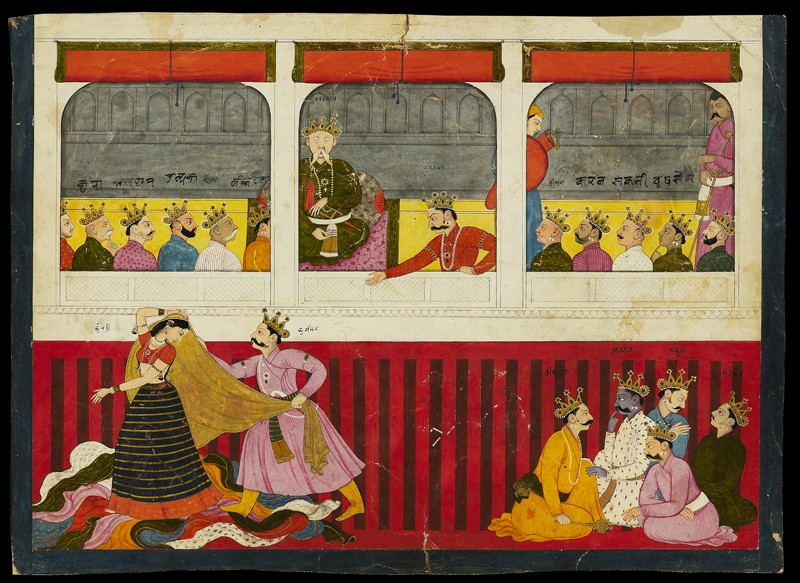
Draupadi humiliated

Shakuni, Duryodhana's uncle, now arranges a dice game, playing on behalf of Duryodhana against Yudhishthira with loaded dice. In the dice game, Yudhishthira loses all his wealth, then his kingdom. Yudhishthira then gambles his brothers, himself, and finally his wife into servitude. The jubilant Kauravas insult the Pandavas in their helpless state and even try to disrobe Draupadi in front of the entire court, but disrobing of Draupadi is prevented by Krishna, who miraculously make her dress endless.

Dhritarashtra, Bhishma, and the other elders are aghast at the situation, but Duryodhana is adamant that there is no place for two crown princes in Hastinapura. Against his wishes Dhritarashtra calls for another dice game which the Pandavas lost again. Pandavas are required to go into exile for 12 years, under the condition of remaining incognito (Agyaata Vaasa) in the 13th year. If they are discovered by the Kauravas in the 13th year of their exile, then they would be forced into exile for another 12 years.

=== Exile and return ===
The Pandavas spend thirteen years in exile; many adventures occur during this time. The Pandavas acquire many divine weapons, given by gods, during this period. They also prepare alliances for a possible future conflict. They spend their final year in disguise in the court of the king Virata, and they are discovered just after the end of the year.

At the end of their exile, they try to negotiate a return to Indraprastha with Krishna as their emissary. However, this negotiation fails, because Duryodhana objected that they were discovered in the 13th year of their exile and the return of their kingdom was not agreed upon. Then the Pandavas fought the Kauravas, claiming their rights over Indraprastha.

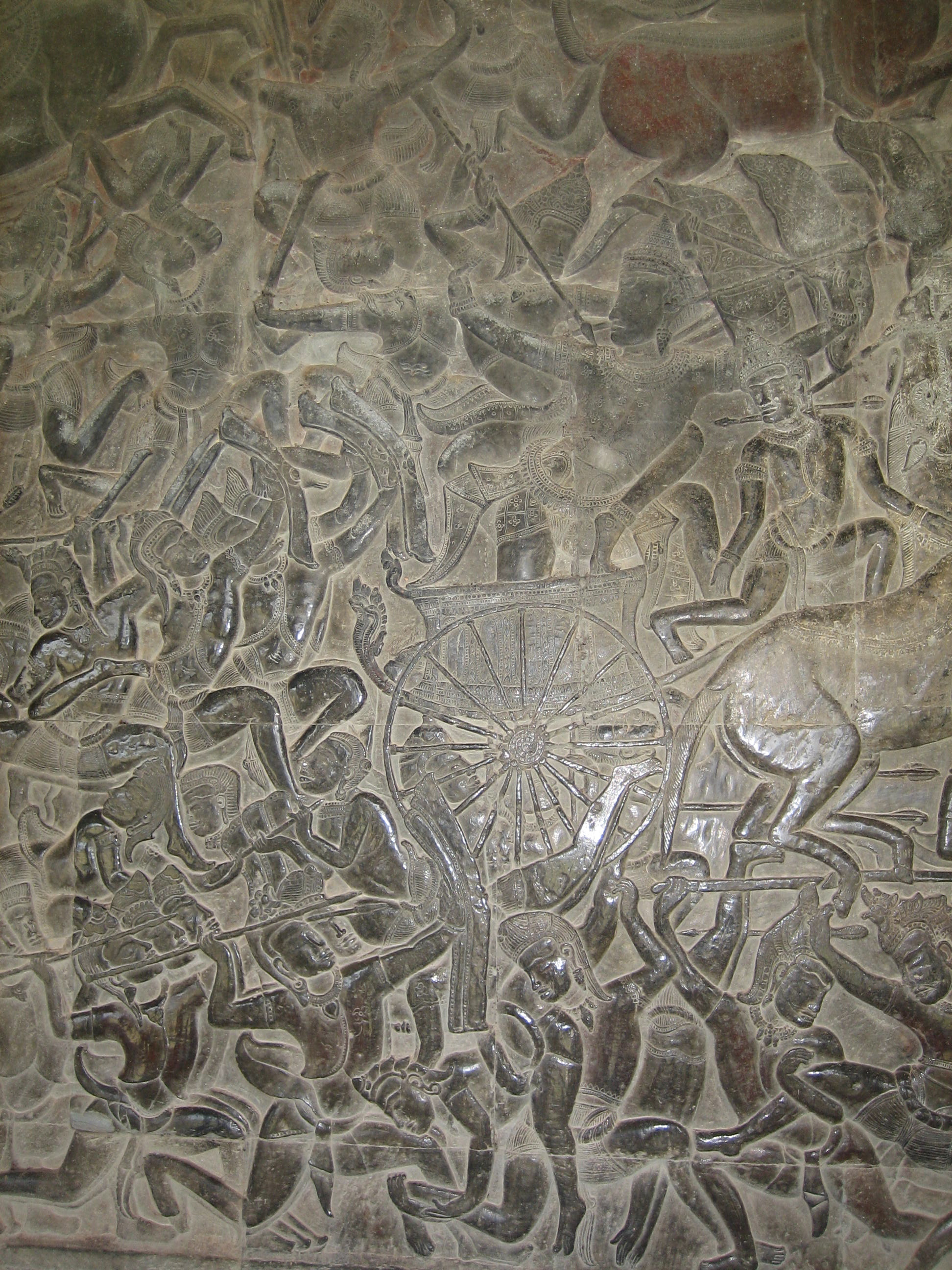
A scene from the Mahabharata war, Angkor Wat: A black stone relief depicting several men wearing a crown and a dhoti, fighting with spears, swords, and bows. A chariot with half the horse out of the frame is seen in the middle.

=== The battle at Kurukshetra ===
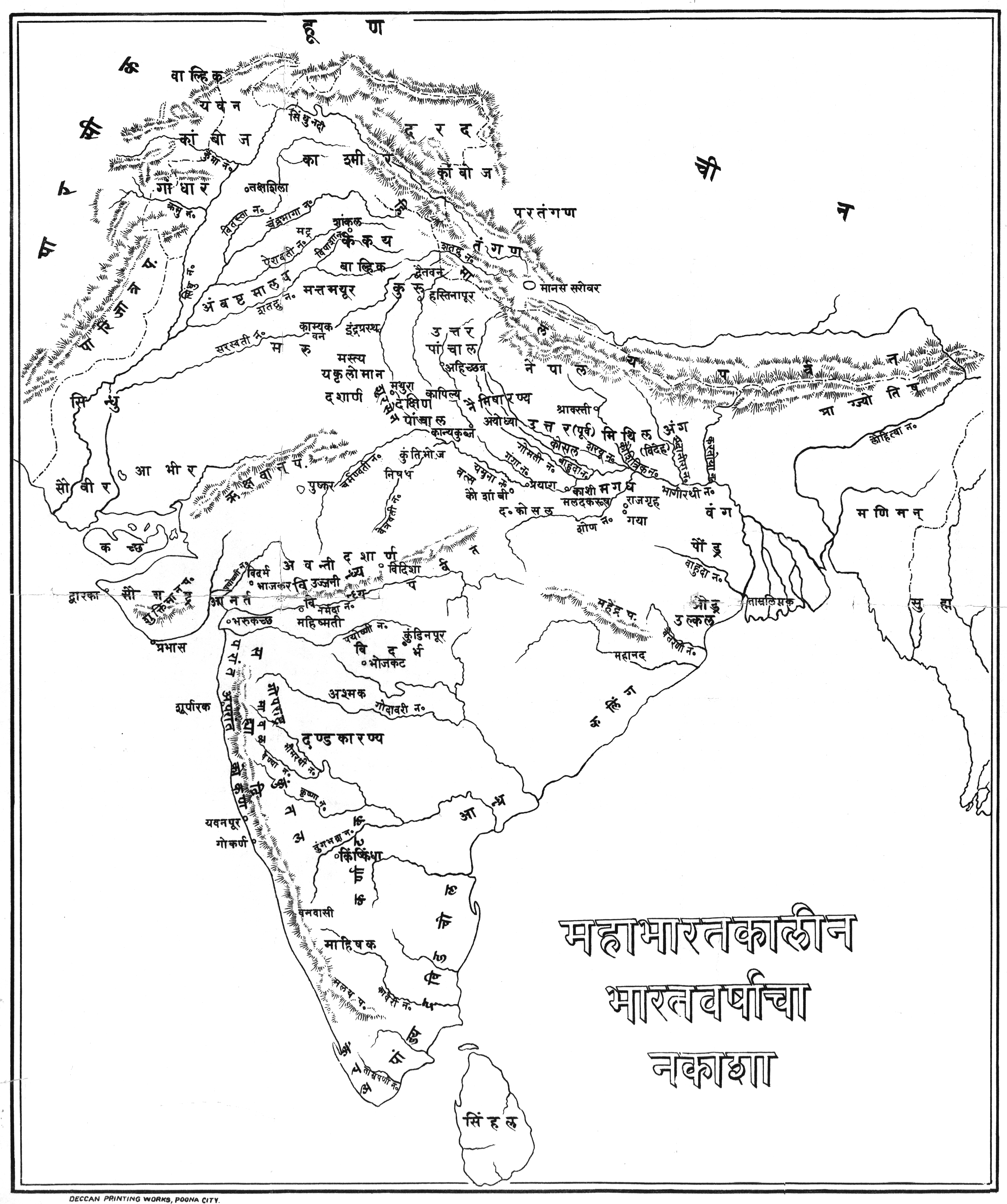
A map of India depicting various regions during the Mahabharata period

The two sides summon vast armies to their help and line up at Kurukshetra for a war. The kingdoms of Panchala, Dwaraka, Kasi, Kekaya, Magadha, Matsya, Chedi, Pandyas, Telinga, the Yadus of Mathura, and some other clans like the Parama Kambojas were allied with the Pandavas. The allies of the Kauravas included the kings of Pragjyotisha, Anga, Kekaya, Sindhudesa (including Sindhus, Sauviras and Sivis), Mahishmati, Avanti in Madhyadesa, Madra, Gandhara, Bahlika people, Kambojas, and many others. Before war is declared, Balarama expresses his unhappiness at the developing conflict and leaves to go on pilgrimage; he does not take part in the battle. Krishna participates in a non-combatant role, as charioteer (Sarathy) for Arjuna and offers Narayani Sena consisting of Abhira gopas to the Kauravas to fight on their side.

Before the battle, Arjuna, noticing that the opposing army includes his cousins and relatives, including his grandfather Bhishma and his teacher Drona, has grave doubts about the fight. He falls into despair and refuses to fight. At this time, Krishna reminds him of his duty as a Kshatriya to fight for a righteous cause in the famous Bhagavad Gita section of the epic.

Though initially adhering to chivalrous notions of warfare, both sides soon adopt dishonorable tactics. At the end of the 18-day battle, only the Pandavas, Satyaki, Kripa, Ashwatthama, Kritavarma, Yuyutsu and Krishna survive. Yudhisthira becomes king of Hastinapur. All warriors who died in the Kurukshetra war go to swarga.

=== The end of the Pandavas ===
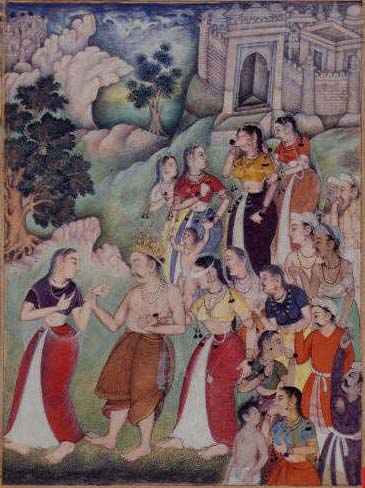
Gandhari, blindfolded, supporting Dhrtarashtra and following Kunti when Dhritarashtra became old and infirm and retired to the forest. A miniature painting from a 16th-century manuscript of part of the Razmnama, a Persian translation of the Mahabharata

After "seeing" the carnage, Gandhari, who had lost all her sons, curses Krishna to be a witness to a similar annihilation of his family, for though divine and capable of stopping the war, he had not done so. Krishna accepts the curse, which bears fruit 36 years later.

The Pandavas, who had ruled their kingdom meanwhile, decide to renounce everything. Clad in skins and rags they retire to the Himalaya and climb towards heaven in their bodily form. A stray dog travels with them. One by one the brothers and Draupadi fall on their way. As each one stumbles, Yudhishthira gives the rest the reason for their fall (Draupadi was partial to Arjuna, Nakula and Sahadeva were vain and proud of their looks, and Bhima and Arjuna were proud of their strength and archery skills, respectively). Only the virtuous Yudhishthira, who had tried everything to prevent the carnage, and the dog remain. The dog reveals himself to be the god Yama (also known as Yama Dharmaraja) and then takes him to the underworld where he sees his siblings and wife. After explaining the nature of the test, Yama takes Yudhishthira back to heaven and explains that it was necessary to expose him to the underworld because (Rajyante narakam dhruvam) any ruler has to visit the underworld at least once. Yama then assures him that his siblings and wife would join him in heaven after they had been exposed to the underworld for measures of time according to their vices.

Arjuna's grandson Parikshit rules after them and dies bitten by a snake. His furious son, Janamejaya, decides to perform a snake sacrifice (sarpasattra) to destroy the snakes. It is at this sacrifice that the tale of his ancestors is narrated to him.

=== The reunion ===
The Mahābhārata mentions that Karna, the Pandavas, Draupadi and Dhritarashtra's sons eventually ascended to svarga and "attained the state of the gods", and banded together – "serene and free from anger".

== Themes ==
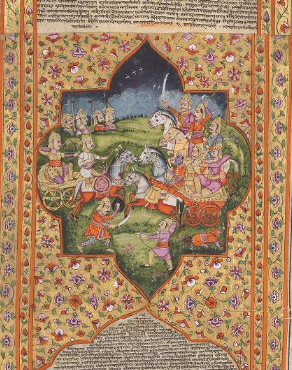
The god Krishna acts as a charioteer to Arjuna in the battle of the Bhagavad Gita, a section of the Mahabharata. Taken from an illustrated manuscript scroll, 1795 C.E. held in the archive collection at the University of Edinburgh, Scotland.

=== Just war ===
The Mahābhārata offers one of the first instances of theorizing about dharmayuddha, "just war", illustrating many of the standards that would be debated later across the world. In the story, one of five brothers asks if the suffering caused by war can ever be justified. A long discussion ensues between the siblings, establishing criteria like proportionality (chariots cannot attack cavalry, only other chariots; no attacking people in distress), just means (no poisoned or barbed arrows), just cause (no attacking out of rage), and fair treatment of captives and the wounded.

=== Samkhya ===
Bhishma describes three principles of Samkhya when narrating the dialogue between King Janaka and Panchashikha.

1. the relation between purusha and avyakta
2. the difference between the conscious self and the body
3. brahman, taken as a single eternal realm

== Translations, versions and derivative works ==
=== Translations ===
The earliest recorded Tamil translation of Mahābhārata is the partially surviving Bharata Venba by Perundevanar in the 9th century, while the first complete surviving Mahābhārata was a work of two poets: Villiputturar of 14th century composing a deliberate 10 out of 18 parvas called Villi Bharatam and Nallapillai of early 18th century who composed and compiled the remaining 8 parvas together, now popular as the Nallapillai Bharatam

An eight of the eighteen parvas of the Javanese Kawi Mahabharata, a prose translation survive from the late 10th century composed by the court of the Mataram King Dharmawangsa, a distinctive version from the Indian counterparts. It has been translated into English by Dr. I. Gusti Putu Phalgunadi.

In Kannada, Adi Kavi Pampa composed the Vikramarjuna Vijaya also called Pampa Bharata in the 10th century CE, while in the 15th century, Kumaravyasa who too composed the deliberate 10 parvas in his Karnata Bharata Kathamanjari, also called Gadugina Bharata. Later, the remaining 8 parvas were composed by Nandi Thimmanna in the 16th century both under the Vijayanagara Empire's patronage.

The Trio-poets of Telugu: Nannaya Bhattaraka under the Eastern Chalukyas, Tikkanna Somyaji under the Kakatiyas and Erra Pragada under the Reddis composed together the Andhra Mahabharatam successively over the period of 11–14th centuries. Sarala Mahabharata was the Odia composition by Sarala Das in the 15th century under Gajapati Empire's patronage.

The Assamese translation called Ashtadasa Mahabharata was composed by the court poet Rama Saraswati of the Kamata Kingdom in the late 16th century. An abridged version in Malayalam Mahabharatham Kilipattu was authored by the renown Thunchaththu Ezhuthachan.

In Marathi, the first complete translation called Vishnudasi Mahabharat was composed by Vishnudas Nama and the partial surviving verse consisting five out of eighteen parvas called Mukteshwari Mahabharat was composed by Mukteshwar, the grandson of Eknath, both independently composing in the Ahmednagar Sultanate in the late 16th century and early 17th century, but the best known complete literary translation in Marathi comes from the Maratha Empire in the late 18th century composed by Moropant titled Aryabharat.

The first Persian translation of the Mahabharata was by the Kashmiri court poet Mullah Ahmad, commissioned by Sultan Zayn al-Abidin in the 15th century and the monumental translation commisioned by the Mughal Emperor Akbar titled Razmnameh, in a mixed prose and poetry was produced by Faizi and ʽAbd al-Qadir Badayuni in 16th century.

Kavi Sanjay of Chittagong and Kavindra Parameshwar are each credited for the first translations into Bengali in the early 15th century. Kavindra's translation was especially done under the court patronage of Paragal Khan, governor of Chittagong of the Bengal Sultanate, also called Paragali Mahabharata while the Kashiram Das began his Bharata Panchali, now renown Kashidasi Mahabharat in the early 17th century during Emperor Jahangir, completing only four parvas before his death, in the later years, the remaining parvas were completed by his family members and students, who followed the same style as well as retaining the 'Kashiram Das' vanity line at the end of every parva.

The first complete Punjabi verse translation however partially surviving was made by the Court Poets of the Sikh Guru Gobind Singh at Anandpur Sahib in the late 17th century of which in the mid 19th century the court of Maharaja Narinder Singh of the Patiala Kingdom attempted a recreation and restoration of the original Sikh Mahabharata now called the Patiala State Version.

The first complete Hindi translation, however, was the colloquial Awadhi Bhasha Mahabharat by Sabal Singh Chauhan through his patron Raja Mitrasen, a courtier of Emperor Aurangzeb in the 17th century and the literary Braj Bhasha Mahabharat Darpan was made by Gokulnath Kavi at the court of the Kingdom of Benares under Maharaja Udit Narayan Singh in the 18th century. The first complete Nepali translation into verse titled Mahabharat Shloka, was in the 19th century by Pundit Raghunath Pokhryal.

The first complete English translation was the Victorian prose version by Kisari Mohan Ganguli, published between 1883 and 1896 (Munshiram Manoharlal Publishers) and by Manmatha Nath Dutt (Motilal Banarsidass Publishers). Most critics consider the translation by Ganguli to be faithful to the original text. The complete text of Ganguli's translation is in the public domain and is available online. An early verse translation by Romesh Chunder Dutt and published in 1898 condenses the main themes of the Mahābhārata into English verse.

A poetic rendering of the full epic into English, done by the poet P. Lal and completed posthumously by his student, was published by Writers Workshop, Calcutta. The P. Lal translation is a non-rhyming verse-by-verse rendering, and it is the only edition in any language to include all slokas in all recensions of the work (not just those in the Critical Edition). Dr. Pradip Bhattacharya stated that the P. Lal version is "known in academia as the 'vulgate'". The text is a "transcreation" rather than a traditional translation.

A project to translate the full epic into English prose, translated by various hands, began to appear in 2005 from the Clay Sanskrit Library, published by New York University Press. The translation is based not on the Critical Edition but on the version known to the commentator Nīlakaṇṭha. Currently available are 15 volumes of the projected 32-volume edition.

Indian Vedic Scholar Shripad Damodar Satwalekar translated the Critical Edition of Mahabharata into Hindi which was assigned to him by the Government of India. After his death, the task was taken up by Shrutisheel Sharma. (Note: Sadwalekar has two translations in Hindi. To read BORI CE in Hindi specifically, go for the translations he published starting from 1968(BORI was published in 1966).)

Indian economist Bibek Debroy also wrote an unabridged English translation in ten volumes. Volume 1: Adi Parva was published in March 2010, and the last two volumes were published in December 2014. Abhinav Agarwal referred to Debroy's translation as "thoroughly enjoyable and impressively scholarly". In a review of the seventh volume, Bhattacharya stated that the translator bridged gaps in the narrative of the Critical Edition, but also noted translation errors. Gautam Chikermane of Hindustan Times wrote that where "both Debroy and Ganguli get tiresome is in the use of adjectives while describing protagonists".

Another English prose translation of the full epic, based on the Critical Edition, is in progress, published by University of Chicago Press. It was initiated by Indologist J. A. B. van Buitenen (books 1–5) and, following a 20-year hiatus caused by the death of van Buitenen, is being continued by several scholars. James L. Fitzgerald translated book 11 and book 12. David Gitomer is translating book 6, Gary Tubb is translating book 7, Christopher Minkowski is translating book 8, Alf Hiltebeitel is translating books 9 and 10, Fitzgerald is translating the second half of book 12, Patrick Olivelle is translating book 13, and Fred Smith is translating book 14–18.

Many condensed versions, abridgments and novelistic prose retellings of the complete epic have been published in English, including works by Ramesh Menon, William Buck, R. K. Narayan, C. Rajagopalachari, Kamala Subramaniam, K. M. Munshi, Krishna Dharma Dasa, Purnaprajna Dasa, Romesh C. Dutt, Bharadvaja Sarma, John D. Smith, Sharon Maas and Paramahansa Yogananda.

=== Critical Edition ===
Between 1919 and 1966, scholars at the Bhandarkar Oriental Research Institute, Pune, compared the various manuscripts of the epic from India and abroad and produced the Critical Edition of the Mahābhārata, on 13,000 pages in 19 volumes, over the span of 47 years, followed by the Harivamsha in another two volumes and six index volumes. This is the text that is usually used in current Mahābhārata studies for reference. This work is sometimes called the "Pune" or "Poona" edition of the Mahabharata.

=== Derivative Literature ===
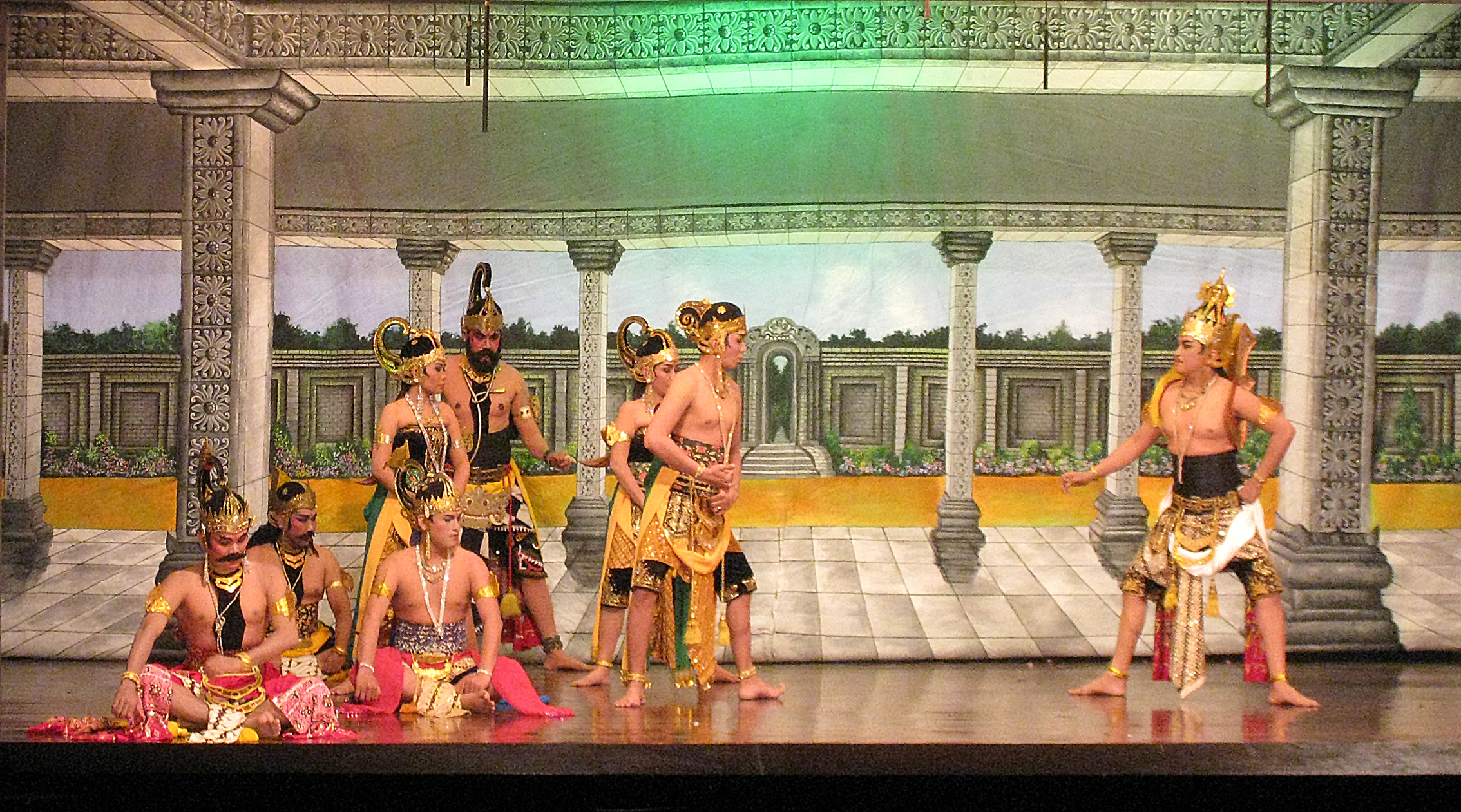
The Pandavas and Krishna in an act of the Javanese wayang wong performance

Bhasa, the 2nd- or 3rd-century CE Sanskrit playwright, wrote two plays on episodes in the Marabharata, Urubhanga (Broken Thigh), about the fight between Duryodhana and Bhima, while Madhyamavyayoga (The Middle One) set around Bhima and his son, Ghatotkacha. Kakawin Bharatayuddha is the poetic adaptation from the Javanese tradition of Kawi Mahabharata.The first important play of 20th century was Andha Yug (The Blind Epoch), by Dharamvir Bharati, which came in 1955, found in Mahabharat, both an ideal source and expression of modern predicaments and discontent. Starting with Ebrahim Alkazi, it was staged by numerous directors. V. S. Khandekar's Marathi novel, Yayati (1960), and Girish Karnad's debut play Yayati (1961) are based on the story of King Yayati found in the Mahabharat. Bengali writer and playwright, Buddhadeva Bose wrote three plays set in Mahabharat, Anamni Angana, Pratham Partha and Kalsandhya. Pratibha Ray wrote an award winning novel entitled Yajnaseni from Draupadi's perspective in 1984. Later, Chitra Banerjee Divakaruni wrote a similar novel entitled The Palace of Illusions: A Novel in 2008. Gujarati poet Chinu Modi has written long narrative poetry Bahuk based on the figure Bahuka. Krishna Udayasankar, a Singapore-based Indian author, has written several novels which are modern-day retellings of the epic, most notably the Aryavarta Chronicles Series. Suman Pokhrel wrote a solo play based on Ray's novel by personalizing and taking Draupadi alone in the scene.

Amar Chitra Katha published a 1,260-page comic book version of the Mahabharata.

=== In film and television ===
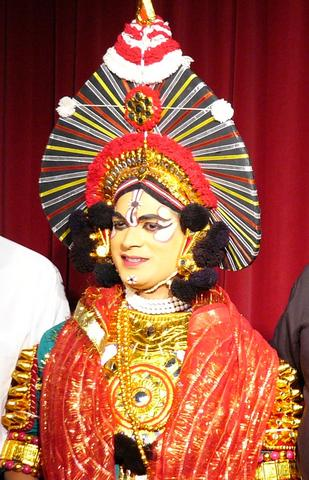
Krishna as portrayed in Yakshagana from Karnataka which is based largely on stories of Mahabharata

In Indian cinema, several film versions of the epic have been made, dating back to 1920. The Mahābhārata was also reinterpreted by Shyam Benegal in Kalyug. Prakash Jha directed 2010 film Raajneeti was partially inspired by the Mahabharata. A 2013 animated adaptation holds the record for India's most expensive animated film.

In 1988, B. R. Chopra created a television series named Mahabharat. It was directed by Ravi Chopra, and was televised on India's national television (Doordarshan). The same year as Mahabharat was being shown on Doordarshan, that same company's other television show, Bharat Ek Khoj, also directed by Shyam Benegal, showed a 2-episode abbreviation of the Mahabharata, drawing from various interpretations of the work, be they sung, danced, or staged. In the Western world, a well-known presentation of the epic is Peter Brook's nine-hour play, which premiered in Avignon in 1985, and its five-hour movie version The Mahābhārata. In the late 2013 Mahabharat was televised on STAR Plus. It was produced by Swastik Productions Pvt.

A Zee TV television series aired from 26 October 2001 to 26 July 2002 and starred Siraj Mustafa Khan as Krishna and Suneel Mattoo as Yudhishthira.

Uncompleted projects on the Mahābhārata include one by Rajkumar Santoshi, and a theatrical adaptation planned by Satyajit Ray.

=== Other adaptations ===
The Mahabharata was adapted by the BBC into a nine-part radio drama entitled Mahabharata Now. The action is instead updated to modern-day India and, thus, hinges its action less on the fate of an entire kingdom but instead that of a massive conglomerate company.

=== In folk culture ===
Every year in the Garhwal region of Uttarakhand, villagers perform the Pandav Lila, a ritual re-enactment of episodes from the Mahabharata through dancing, singing, and recitation. The lila is a cultural highlight of the year and is usually performed between November and February. Folk instruments of the region, dhol, damau and two long trumpets bhankore, accompany the action. The amateur actors often break into a spontaneous dance when they are "possessed" by the spirits of the figures of the Mahabharata.

=== Jain version ===
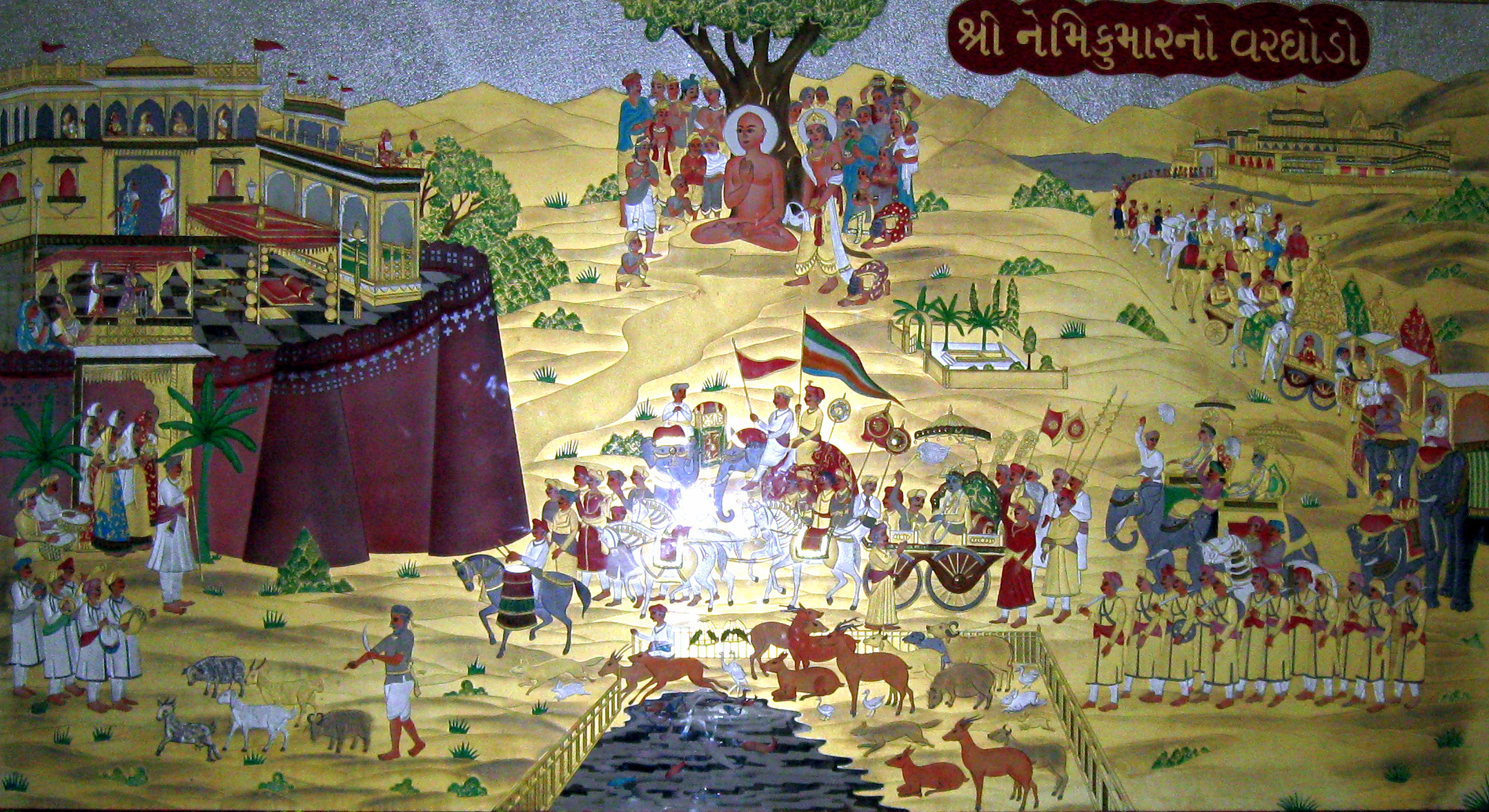
Depiction of wedding procession of Neminatha. The enclosure shows the animals that are to be slaughtered for food for weddings. Overcome with Compassion for animals, Neminatha refused to marry and renounced his kingdom to become a Shramana

Apart from Vikramarjuna Vijaya, the single localised Jain composition of the complete Mahabharata in Kannada, the popular Jain versions of the Mahābhārata on the otherhand can be found in the various Jain texts written in Sanskrit like Harivamsapurana (the story of Harivamsa) Trisastisalakapurusa Caritra (Hagiography of 63 Illustrious persons), Pandavacharitra (lives of Pandavas) and Pandavapurana (stories of Pandavas). From the earlier canonical literature, Antakrddaaśāh (8th cannon) and Vrisnidasa (upangagama or secondary canon) contain the stories of Neminatha (22nd Tirthankara), Krishna and Balarama. Prof. Padmanabh Jaini notes that, unlike in the Hindu Puranas, the names Baladeva and Vasudeva are not restricted to Balarama and Krishna in Jain Puranas. Instead, they serve as names of two distinct classes of mighty brothers, who appear nine times in each half of time cycles of the Jain cosmology and rule half the earth as half-chakravartins. Jaini traces the origin of this list of brothers to the Jinacharitra by Bhadrabahu swami (4th–3rd century BCE). According to Jain cosmology Balarama, Krishna and Jarasandha are the ninth and the last set of Baladeva, Vasudeva, and Prativasudeva. The main battle is not the Mahabharata, but the fight between Krishna and Jarasandha (who is killed by Krishna as Prativasudevas are killed by Vasudevas). Ultimately, the Pandavas and Balarama take renunciation as Jain monks and are reborn in heavens, while on the other hand Krishna and Jarasandha are reborn in hell. In keeping with the law of karma, Krishna is reborn in hell for his exploits (sexual and violent) while Jarasandha for his evil ways. Prof. Jaini admits a possibility that perhaps because of his popularity, the Jain authors were keen to rehabilitate Krishna. The Jain texts predict that after his karmic term in the hell is over sometime during the next half time-cycle, Krishna will be reborn as a Jain Tirthankara and attain liberation. Krishna and Balrama are shown as contemporaries and cousins of 22nd Tirthankara, Neminatha. According to this story, Krishna arranged young Neminath's marriage with Rajemati, the daughter of Ugrasena, but Neminatha, empathizing with the animals which were to be slaughtered for the marriage feast, left the procession suddenly and renounced the world.

== Kuru family tree ==
This shows the line of royal and family succession, not necessarily the parentage. See the notes below for detail.

Kuru family tree

Kuru^{[a]}
Anasawan^{[a]}
Bheemasena(1)^{[a]}
Pratisravas^{[a]}
Pratipa^{[a]}
Gangā	Shāntanu^{[a]}	Satyavati	Pārāshara
Bhishma	Chitrāngada	Ambikā	Vichitravirya	Ambālikā	Vyāsa
Dhritarāshtra^{b}	Gāndhāri	Shakuni	Surya (Deva)	Kunti	Pāndu^{b}	Mādri
Karna^{c}	Yudhishthira^{d}	Bhima^{d}	Arjuna^{d}	Subhadrā	Nakula^{d}	Sahadeva^{d}
Duryodhana^{e}	Dussalā	Dushāsana	(98 sons)
Abhimanyu^{f}	Uttarā
Parikshit	Madravti
Janamejaya

Key to Symbols

- Male: blue border
- Female: red border
- Pandavas: green box
- Kauravas: yellow box

Notes

- a: Shantanu was a king of the Kuru dynasty or kingdom, and was some generations removed from any ancestor called Kuru. His marriage to Ganga preceded his marriage to Satyavati.
- b: Pandu and Dhritarashtra were fathered by Vyasa in the niyoga tradition after Vichitravirya's death. Dhritarashtra, Pandu and Vidura were the sons of Vyasa with Ambika, Ambalika and a maid servant respectively.
- c: Karna was born to Kunti through her invocation of Surya, before her marriage to Pandu.
- d: Yudhishthira, Bhima, Arjuna, Nakula and Sahadeva were acknowledged sons of Pandu but were begotten by the invocation by Kunti and Madri of various deities. They all married Draupadi (not shown in tree).
- e: Duryodhana and his siblings were born at the same time, and they were of the same generation as their Pandava cousins.
- f : Although the succession after the Pandavas was through the descendants of Arjuna and Subhadra, it was Yudhishthira and Draupadi who occupied the throne of Hastinapura after the great battle.

The birth order of siblings is correctly shown in the family tree (from left to right), except for Vyasa and Bhishma whose birth order is not described, and Vichitravirya and Chitrangada who were born after them. The fact that Ambika and Ambalika are sisters is not shown in the family tree. The birth of Duryodhana took place after the birth of Karna and Yudhishthira, but before the birth of the remaining Pandava brothers.

Some siblings of the characters shown here have been left out for clarity; this includes Vidura, half-brother to Dhritarashtra and Pandu.

== Cultural influence ==
In the Bhagavad Gita, Krishna explains to Arjuna his duties as a warrior and prince and elaborates on different Yogic and Vedantic philosophies, with examples and analogies. This has led to the Gita often being described as a concise guide to Hindu philosophy and a practical, self-contained guide to life. In more modern times, Swami Vivekananda, Netaji Subhas Chandra Bose, Bal Gangadhar Tilak, Mahatma Gandhi and many others used the text to help inspire the Indian independence movement.

It has also inspired several works of modern Hindi literature, such as Ramdhari Singh Dinkar's Rashmirathi, which is a rendition of Mahabharata centered around Karna and his conflicts. It was written in 1952, and won the prestigious Jnanpith Award in 1972.

== Modern translations ==
The Mahabharata has been translated into English many times. Some translations are incomplete.

=== Single-volume translations ===
- Narasimhan, Chakravarthi V. (1997). The Mahabharata. Columbia University Press.
- Narayan, R.K. (2016). The Mahabharata: A Shortened Modern Prose Version of the Indian Epic. University of Chicago Press.
  - This is one of the shortest translations of the Mahabharata available.
- Sattar, Arshia (2020). Mahabharata for Children. Juggernaut Books.
  - This translation is illustrated for children.
- Satyamurti, Carole (2016). Mahabharata: A Modern Retelling. Norton.
  - This is a poetic retelling.
- Smith, John D. (2009). The Mahabharata (Penguin Classics). Penguin.
  - This translation is directly from Sanskrit.

=== Multi-volume translations ===
- van Buitenen, J. A. B.; Fitzgerald, James (1973–2026). The Mahabharata. Chicago: University of Chicago Press.
  - This translation includes numerous books of the Mahabharata. It is still incomplete
- Clay Sanskrit Library (2009), Mahabharata. New York University Press.
  - This translation includes 15 volumes by different translators and is incomplete.

=== Translations of specific books ===
- Doniger, Wendy (2022). After the War: The Last Books of the Mahabharata. Speaking Tiger.
- Johnson, W.J. (1999). The Sauptikaparvan of the Mahabharata: The Massacre at Night (Oxford World's Classics). Oxford University Press.

== General sources ==
- Badrinath, Chaturvedi. The Mahābhārata: An Inquiry in the Human Condition, New Delhi, Orient Longman (2006).
- Bandyopadhyaya, Jayantanuja (2008). Class and Religion in Ancient India. Anthem Press.
- Basham, A. L. (1954). The Wonder That Was India: A Survey of the Culture of the Indian Sub-Continent Before The Coming of the Muslims. New York: Grove Press.
- Bhasin, R. V. Mahabharata published by National Publications, India, 2007.
- J. Brockington. The Sanskrit Epics, Leiden (1998).
- van Buitenen, Johannes Adrianus Bernardus (1978). The Mahābhārata. 3 volumes (translation / publication incomplete due to his death). University of Chicago Press.
- Chaitanya, Krishna (K.K. Nair). The Mahabharata, A Literary Study, Clarion Books, New Delhi 1985.
- Gupta, S. P. and Ramachandran, K. S. (ed.). Mahabharata: myth and reality. Agam Prakashan, New Delhi 1976.
- Hiltebeitel, Alf. The Ritual of Battle, Krishna in the Mahabharata, SUNY Press, New York 1990.
- Hopkins, E. W. The Great Epic of India, New York (1901).
- Jyotirmayananda, Swami. Mysticism of the Mahabharata, Yoga Research Foundation, Miami 1993.
- Katz, Ruth Cecily Arjuna in the Mahabharata, University of South Carolina Press, Columbia 1989.
- Keay, John (2000). India: A History. Grove Press. ISBN 978-0-8021-3797-5.
- Majumdar, R. C. (1951). The History and Culture of the Indian People: (Volume 1) The Vedic Age. London: George Allen & Unwin Ltd.
- Lerner, Paule. Astrological Key in Mahabharata, David White (trans.) Motilal Banarsidass, New Delhi 1988.
- Mallory, J. P (2005). In Search of the Indo-Europeans. Thames & Hudson. ISBN 0-500-27616-1
- Mehta, M. The problem of the double introduction to the Mahabharata, JAOS 93 (1973), 547–550.
- Minkowski, C. Z. Janamehayas Sattra and Ritual Structure, JAOS 109 (1989), 410–420.
- Minkowski, C. Z. 'Snakes, Sattras and the Mahabharata', in: Essays on the Mahabharata, ed. A. Sharma, Leiden (1991), 384–400.
- Oldenberg, Hermann. Zur Geschichte der Altindischen Prosa, Berlin (1917)
- Oberlies, Th. 'The Counsels of the Seer Narada: Ritual on and under the surface of the Mahabharata', in: New methods in the research of epic (ed. H. L. C. Tristram), Freiburg (1998).
- Oldenberg, H. Das Mahabharata, Göttingen (1922).
- Pāṇini. Ashtādhyāyī. Book 4. Translated by Chandra Vasu. Benares, 1896. (in Sanskrit and English)
- Pargiter, F. E. Ancient Indian Historical Tradition, London 1922. Repr. Motilal Banarsidass 1997.
- Sattar, Arshia (transl.) (1996). The Rāmāyaṇa by Vālmīki. Viking. p. 696. ISBN 978-0-14-029866-6.
- Sukthankar, Vishnu S. and Shrimant Balasaheb Pant Pratinidhi (1933). The Mahabharata: for the first time critically edited. Bhandarkar Oriental Research Institute.
- Sullivan, Bruce M. Seer of the Fifth Veda, Krsna Dvaipayana Vyasa in the Mahabharata, Motilal Banarsidass, New Delhi 1999.
- Sutton, Nicholas. Religious Doctrines in the Mahabharata, Motilal Banarsidass, New Delhi 2000.
- Utgikar, N. B. "The mention of the Mahābhārata in the Ashvalayana Grhya Sutra", Proceedings and Transactions of the All-India Oriental Conference, Poona (1919), vol. 2, Poona (1922), 46–61.
- Vaidya, R. V. A Study of Mahabharat; A Research, Poona, A.V.G. Prakashan, 1967
- Witzel, Michael, Epics, Khilas and Puranas: Continuities and Ruptures, Proceedings of the Third Dubrovnik International Conference on the Sanskrit Epics and Puranas, ed. P. Koskiallio, Zagreb (2005), 21–80.
