= Nallapillai =

Nallapillai Karuneegar (Tamil: நல்லபிள்ளை கருணீகர்), was an early 18th century Tamil poet known for composing and compiling the first complete Tamil translation of the whole Mahabharata, finishing the remaining 8 parvas of Villiputturar's the Villi Bharatam. Nallapillai co-authored expansions into Villi Bharatam with a scholar Murugappa Upadhyay, adding missing stories, details and writing the final 8 parvas. His work being called Nallapillai Bharatam.

Nallapillai was born in Muthalambedu, a hamlet in Kavarapettai near present-day Chennai. He was supported by a wealthy benefactor by the name Sengadu Veeraraghava Reddiar, upon completion Nallapillai traveled along with his patron to Varadharaja Perumal Temple in Kanchipuram to recite and launch the text. Later, during the British Raj, his compilation were officially printed as the Tamil Mahabharata.
