= Ramesh Menon (writer) =

Indian translator (born 1951)

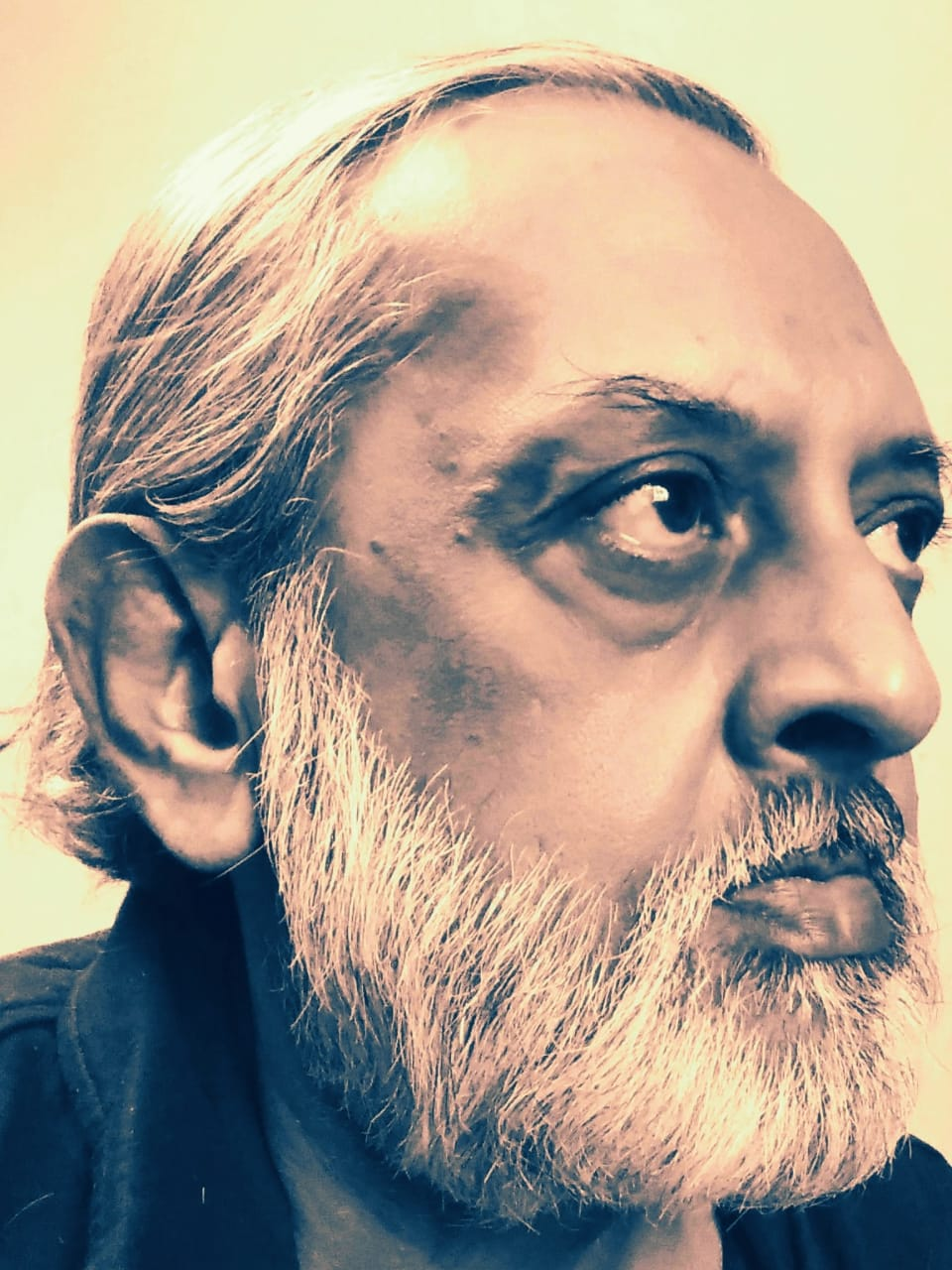
- Born: 20 September 1951 (age 74); New Delhi, India
- Occupation: Author
- Writing career
- Notable works: The Ramayana: A Modern Retelling of the Great Indian Epic * The Mahabharata: A Modern Rendering (two volumes) * Krishna: Life and Song of the Blue God * Siva: The Siva Purana Retold * Devi: The Devi Bhagavatam Retold * Bhagavata Purana (two volumes) * Srimad Bhagavad-Gita * The Complete Mahabharata (twelve volumes)

Ramakrishna Ramesh Menon (born 20 September 1951) is an Indian author.

He has written several literary renderings in modern English prose of classical works from the ancient Hindu tradition.

His books include:

- The Ramayana: A Modern Retelling of the Great Indian Epic (Farrar, Straus and Giroux and HarperCollins India)
- The Mahabharata: A Modern Rendering (two volumes)
- Krishna: Life and Song of the Blue God
- Siva: The Siva Purana Retold
- Devi: The Devi Bhagavatam Retold
- The Bhagavata Purana (two volumes)
- a new translation of the Bhagavad Gita
- twelve-volume retelling of The Complete Mahabharata (as writer and series editor)

– all published by Rupa Publications.

All his main books, apart from the latest Complete Mahabharata series (finished in September 2017), have gone into many reprints in India.

== Early life, education and career ==
Born in New Delhi, Menon studied at St Xavier's High School and St Stephen's College, where he read history honours (1968–69) and then philosophy honours (1969–70), but left college without taking a degree.

Reading the Bhagavad Gita at this time was a life-changing experience for him. It was the seed from which all his later work emerged.

He developed an informal guru-sishya relationship with the Malayalam novelist O. V. Vijayan, and translated two of his master's novels into English: The Infinity of Grace (Penguin) and Madhuram Gayathi (yet to be published by Vijayan's estate after his death in 2005).

In addition to Delhi, Menon has lived and worked in Bangalore, Chennai, Hong Kong, Jakarta, Kodaikanal and Thiruvananthapuram.

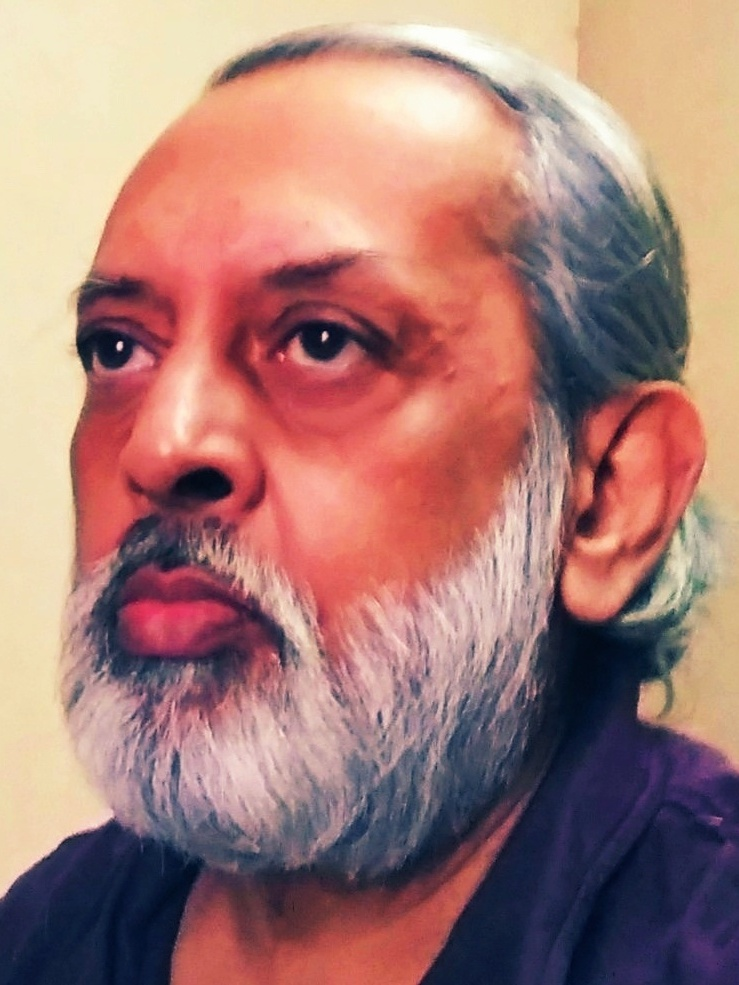
Ramesh Menon

== Critical response ==
In a starred review, Kirkus Reviews described his Ramayana as "A masterpiece made new for a generation of readers who ought to be very grateful indeed to Menon".

British theatre director Peter Brook called the book A beautiful new rendering of an inexhaustible theme.

His two-volume rendering of The Mahabharata is his most read and reviewed book.

== See also ==
- List of Indian writers
- List of translators into English
