= Villiputturar =

Tamil poet

Villiputturar (Tamil: வில்லி புத்தூரார்) was a 14th-century Tamil poet best known for authoring the Villi Bharatam (வில்லி பாரதம்), which is considered the first complete surviving translation of the epic Mahabharata. He was born in Saniyoor, a village in the Thirumunaipaadi region of Tamil Nadu. His work was composed at the request of the local ruler, Kongar Kon Varapathi Aatkondaan. Villi Bharatham is a masterpiece of Tamil literature written in the viruttam metre covering the deliberate first 10 of the original Sanskrit's 18 chapters in the Mahabharata into a narrative deeply rooted in Vaishnava bhakti. It remains highly influential today frequently used in traditional Tamil folk arts like Villu Paatu (bow song) and Therukoothu.
