= Gusti Yehoshua Braverman =

Israeli activist

Gusti Yehoshua Braverman (Hebrew: גוסטי יהושע ברוורמן) is an Israeli activist who is an Executive Board member of the World Zionist Organization and the Head of the Department of Irgoon and Connection with Israelis Abroad. Her previous positions include being the Head of the Department of Diaspora Affairs in the World Zionist Organization, the deputy director of the Reform Movement in Israel, and the director of the Tamar Dance Company.

== Biography ==
Gusti Yehoshua Braverman was born in Romania and came to Israel when she was 6 months years old. She attended The Hebrew University of Jerusalem, graduating with a BA in Social Work and Mass Communication, and an MA in Mass Communication. She is also certified in Organizational Consulting by Tel Aviv University.

== Public service career ==
Yehoshua Braverman was the director of the Tamar Dance Company in 1990–1992 and the Associate Director of Israeli Movement for Progressive Judaism from September 1993-July 2010.

Gusti represented the Reform Movement at the World Zionist Congress. She was elected to the World Zionist Organization Executive at the 36th World Zionist Congress in 2010 as the co-chair of the Department for Zionist Activities in the Diaspora. She was the Chairperson of the Department for Diaspora Activities. between 2012-2020 and since then she is the Head of the Department of Irgoon which includes: 36 Zionist federations in the world, leading the world Zionist congress and Connection with Israelis Abroad in the WZO.

Since 2010 to 2023, she has been a member of the Board of Governors of the Jewish Agency for Israel and a member of the Public Council to Commemorate Theodor Herzl.

During her time as the Chair of the Department for Diaspora Activities, she initiated the organization of Zionist educational programs and events, such as FeminIsrael, a celebration of Women's History Month and women in Israel. She spearheaded the creation of the "Beit Ha'am" initiative, a supplementary school for Israelis children to enrich their Hebrew and teach Jewish and Israeli culture, and works closely with the Herzl Museum in Jerusalem on the creation of interactive educational exhibits. She also initiated the opening of a Center Dedicated to Theodor Herzl in Budapest, located in the Israeli Cultural Center.

Yehoshua Braverman is the chairwoman of the Jerusalem Prize committee, awarded each year.

After October 7, Yehoshua Braverman and the World Zionist Organization led an initiative of Kabbalat Shabbat ceremony around the world, in a call for unity of all Jewish communities. In 2024, after October 7 attack The Hebrew university did a study, initiated by Yehoshua Braverman and her department, checking Israelis abroad. This led to a discussion on the Committee for Immigration, Absorption and Diaspora Affairs in the Knesset of Israel.
