= References of Pragjyotisha in Mahabharata =

== King Bhagadatta of Pragjyotisha ==
- Arjuna defeats Bhagadatta, the king of Pragjyotisha, during his military campaign to collect tribute for Pandava king Yudhishthira's Rajasuya sacrifice. (2,26)
- An encounter took place between Bhagadatta and Arjuna for days together each desirous of victory over the other. Then Bhagadatta, who regarded Indra as his friend, made friendship with Arjuna. (5,168)
- King Bhagadatta of Pragjyotisha accompanied by all Mlechcha tribes inhabiting the marshy regions on the sea-shore; and many mountain kings came to attend Yudhishthira's Rajasuya sacrifice. (2,33)
- The great warrior king Bhagadatta, the brave ruler of Pragjyotisha and the mighty sovereign of the mlechchas, at the head of a large number of Yavanas came to the Rajasuya sacrifice. (2,50)
- Bhagadatta was one of the main car-warrior in the Kaurava army for the Kurukshetra War. (5,55)
- The ruler of Pragjyotisha, the brave Bhagadatta is the foremost of those holding the elephant hook (skilled in fighting from the neck of a war-elephant) and is skilled also in fighting from a car. (5,168)
- Bhagadatta, the Pragyotisha king, fought in Kurukshetra War as a general under the Kaurava generallisimo Bhishma. (6-65,75,82,84,96,112,114,115,117)
- He also fought under Drona another Kaurava generalissimo. (7-20,24,25,26,27).
- He was slain by Arjuna. (7,27)

== King Vajradatta of Pragjyotisha ==
- After the Kurukshetra War, Arjuna fought a war with Bhagadatta's son Vajradatta, at Pragjyotisha, to collect tribute for Yudhishthira's Rajasuya sacrifice. (14,75)

== The road to Pragjyotisha ==
- By destroying the Mauravas and the Pashas, and slaying Nisunda and Naraka, Vasudeva Krishna hast again rendered safe the road to Pragjyotisha. (3,12)

== Vasudeva Krishna's attack on Pragjyotisha king Naraka ==
The Asuras had a city named Pragjyotisha, which was formidable, inaccessible and unbearable. It was there that the mighty Naraka, the son of the Earth (Bhauma), kept the jewelled ear-rings of Aditi, having brought them by force. Aditi's sons (the Devas) were unable to recover them. Beholding Krishna’s prowess and might, and weapon that is irresistible they employed him for the destruction of those Asuras. Krishna agreed to undertake that exceedingly difficult task. In the city of Nirmochana that hero slew six thousand Asuras, and cutting into pieces innumerable keen-edged shafts, he slew Mura and hosts of Rakshasas, and then entered that city called Pragjyotisha. It was there, that an encounter took place between the mighty’ Naraka and Krishna. Slain by Krishna, Naraka lay lifeless there. Having slain the Earth’s son (Bhumi-putra or Bhauma), Naraka, and also Mura, and having recovered those jewelled ear-rings, Krishnacame back, adorned with undying fame. (5,48; mentioned also at 12,339)

- When Krishna went to Pragjyotisha, Naraka with all the Danavas succeeded not in seizing him there. (5,130)
- Vasudeva Krishna mentions that when he and his army was at Pragjyotisha, fighting there, Chedi king Shishupala, Krishna's cousine and enemy, came and burnt Dwaraka, the capital of Yadavas, in which Vasudeva Krishna belonged. (2,44)
- Salwa kings car of precious metals capable of going anywhere at will, bewildering all, reappeared at Pragjyotisha! (3,22)

== See also ==
- Kingdoms of Ancient India
