= Gusti B =

Icelandic actor, radio host and internet personality

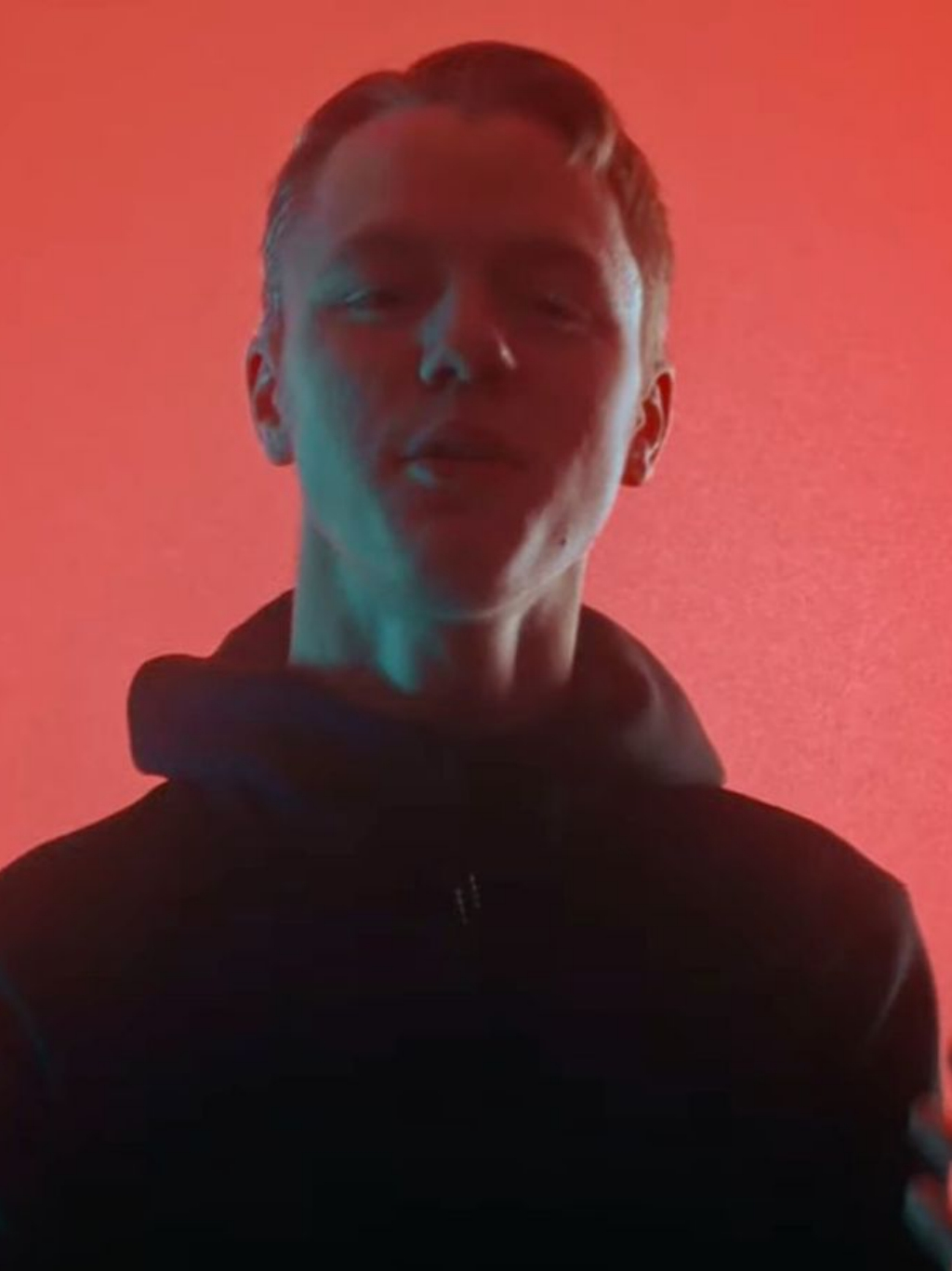
- Born: Ágúst Beinteinn Árnason; 12 December 2001 (age 24); Iceland

Ágúst Beinteinn Árnason (born 12 December 2001), professionally known as Gusti B, is an Icelandic actor, radio personality, and internet personality. He began his career in theatre and voice acting before gaining public attention through online content and media appearances. In 2022, he became the youngest radio host in Iceland. Since then, he has worked across television, podcasting, and stage productions, appearing regularly in both traditional and digital formats.

== Career ==
Gusti began performing at a young age with the Reykjavík City Theatre, the National Theatre of Iceland, and Gaflaraleikhúsið.

He has appeared in films and television series including The Lava Field, Cubs, and the Polish feature film Wolka, in which he played the role of Oskar. He has also voiced characters in Icelandic-language versions of animated shows such as Denver, the Last Dinosaur and Monchhichis, and played the lead in the radio drama Mio, My Son.

In 2021, Gusti gained national attention for keeping a pet arctic fox, which he featured in a series of viral social media videos, including clips of him walking the fox through downtown Reykjavík. The police special forces unit (sérsveitin) later arrived at his home with a search warrant, attempting to seize the animal.

In 2022, he joined the music station FM 957, becoming the youngest radio host in Iceland. His morning segments gained popularity for their comedic timing, interviews with musicians, and integration of trending online content.

In 2023, he co-created and hosted the baking competition series Kökukast (Cake Throwdown) on the streaming platform Stöð 2, alongside his brother Árni Beinteinn. The show, featuring cake decoration challenges, was named Children's and Youth Program of the Year at the RÚV Children's Media Awards. Around the same time, he made guest appearances on the Icelandic edition of Idol, where he led contestants through unconventional challenges between performances.

He was voted Television Personality of the Year at the 2024 RÚV awards, which recognize achievements in children's and youth media.

Later that year, he transitioned his radio show into a weekly podcast. The show features phone prank calls, irreverent discussions on nightlife and relationships, and uncomfortable questions posed to guests—topics that have resonated with a younger Icelandic audience and earned the show a loyal following.

In 2025, Gusti joined the ensemble cast of the family theatre production Ávaxtakarfan, staged at Harpa Concert Hall in Reykjavík, taking on a role previously performed by Icelandic musician Króli.
