= I Gusti Putu Phalgunadi =

Indonesian scholar (1948–2014)

Dr. I Gusti Putu Phalgunadi (3 January 1948 – September 24, 2014) was an Indonesian scholar who has translated many of Indonesian scriptures from the Kawi language to English.

== Biography ==
Born on 3 January 1948 at Denpasar, Bali, he died on September 24, 2014, and his funeral was held on October 1, 2014. The topic of his thesis was: Tambang Badung Temple at a Glance.

In 1978, he won a scholarship to pursue his research work in India. For his research purposes, he has traveled throughout India particularly the historical and holy places. He had visited most of the Capitals of States in India except the North-east States. Since a decade, he was moving between Delhi-Bodhgaya-Haridar in search of his mission. He was awarded scholarships by many private institutes as well as the Government of India.

- 1978-79 Scholarship from International Academy of Indian Culture, New Delhi
- 1979-81 General Culture Scholarship Scheme from Government of India
- 1981-88 General Culture Scholarship Scheme from Government of India
- 1985-88 Senior Scholarship Holder from Indian Council of Historical Research, New Delhi.

== Mahabharata ==
Of the eighteen parvas, only eight (1, 4-6, and 15-18) Kawi manuscripts remain.

- Vol 1: Adi Parva - The First Book, 305 pages, 1990, ISBN 81-85179-50-6
- Vol 2: Virata parva - The Fourth Book, 197 pages, 1992, ISBN 81-85689-05-9
- Vol 3: Udyoga parva, 345 pages, 1994, ISBN 81-85689-96-2
- Vol 4: Bhishma parva, 283 pages, 1995, ISBN 81-86471-05-7
- Vol 5: Asramavasa parva, Mosala parva, Prasthanika parva, Svargarohanaparva, 161 pages, 1997, ISBN 81-86471-11-1

== Ramayana ==
Indonesian Ramayana : The Uttarakanda - 240 pages, 1999, ISBN 81-7574-053-1

== Others ==
- The Indonesian Brahmanda purana - 349 pages, 2000, ISBN 81-7574-088-4
- Evolution of Hindu Culture in Bali - 194 pages, 1991, ISBN 81-85067-65-1 (81-85067-65-1)
- The Pararaton - 164 pages, 2002, ISBN 81-85067-97-X (81-85067-97-X)
- Fundamental Dictionary Of Balinese Language And Culture - 1995
- Tambang Badung Temple at a Glance
- Bali Embraces Hinduism - 2005
