= Keechaka Vadham =

Silent film by R. Nataraja Mudaliar

- Directed by: R. Nataraja Mudaliar
- Written by: C. Rangavadivelu
- Produced by: R. Nataraja Mudaliar
- Starring: Raju Mudaliar; Jeevarathnam
- Cinematography: R. Nataraja Mudaliar
- Edited by: R. Nataraja Mudaliar
- Production company: India Film Company
- Country: India
- Language: Silent
- Budget: ₹35,000
- Box office: ₹50,000

Keechaka Vadham (transl. The Extermination of Keechaka) is an Indian silent film produced, directed, filmed and edited by R. Nataraja Mudaliar. The first film to have been made in South India, it was shot in five weeks at Mudaliar's production house, India Film Company. As the members of the cast were Tamils, Keechaka Vadham is considered to be the first Tamil film. No print of it is known to have survived, making it a lost film.

The screenplay, written by C. Rangavadivelu, is based on an episode from the Virata Parva segment of the Hindu epic Mahabharata, focusing on Keechaka's attempts to woo Draupadi, the common wife of the five Pandava brothers. The film stars Raju Mudaliar and Jeevarathnam as the central characters.

Released in the late 1910s, (Note: While film historians Suresh Chabria and Film News Anandan said the film was released in 1917, film historians Randor Guy, S. Muthiah and history professor Knut A. Jacobsen asserted the film was released in 1918.) Keechaka Vadham was commercially successful and received positive critical feedback. The film's success prompted Nataraja Mudaliar to make a series of similar films based on Hindu mythology, which laid the foundation for the South Indian cinema industry and led to him being recognised as "the father of Tamil cinema." Nataraja Mudaliar's works were an inspiration to other filmmakers including Raghupathi Surya Prakasa and J. C. Daniel.

== Plot ==
Keechaka, the commander of King Virata's forces, attempts to woo and marry Draupadi by any means necessary; he even tries to molest Draupadi, prompting her to tell Bhima, one of her husbands who is one of the Pandava brothers, about it. Later, when Keechaka meets Draupadi, she requests him to meet her at a secret hiding place. He arrives there, only to find Bhima instead of Draupadi; Bhima kills him.

== Cast ==
- Raju Mudaliar as Keechaka
- Jeevarathnam as Draupadi

== Production ==
=== Development ===
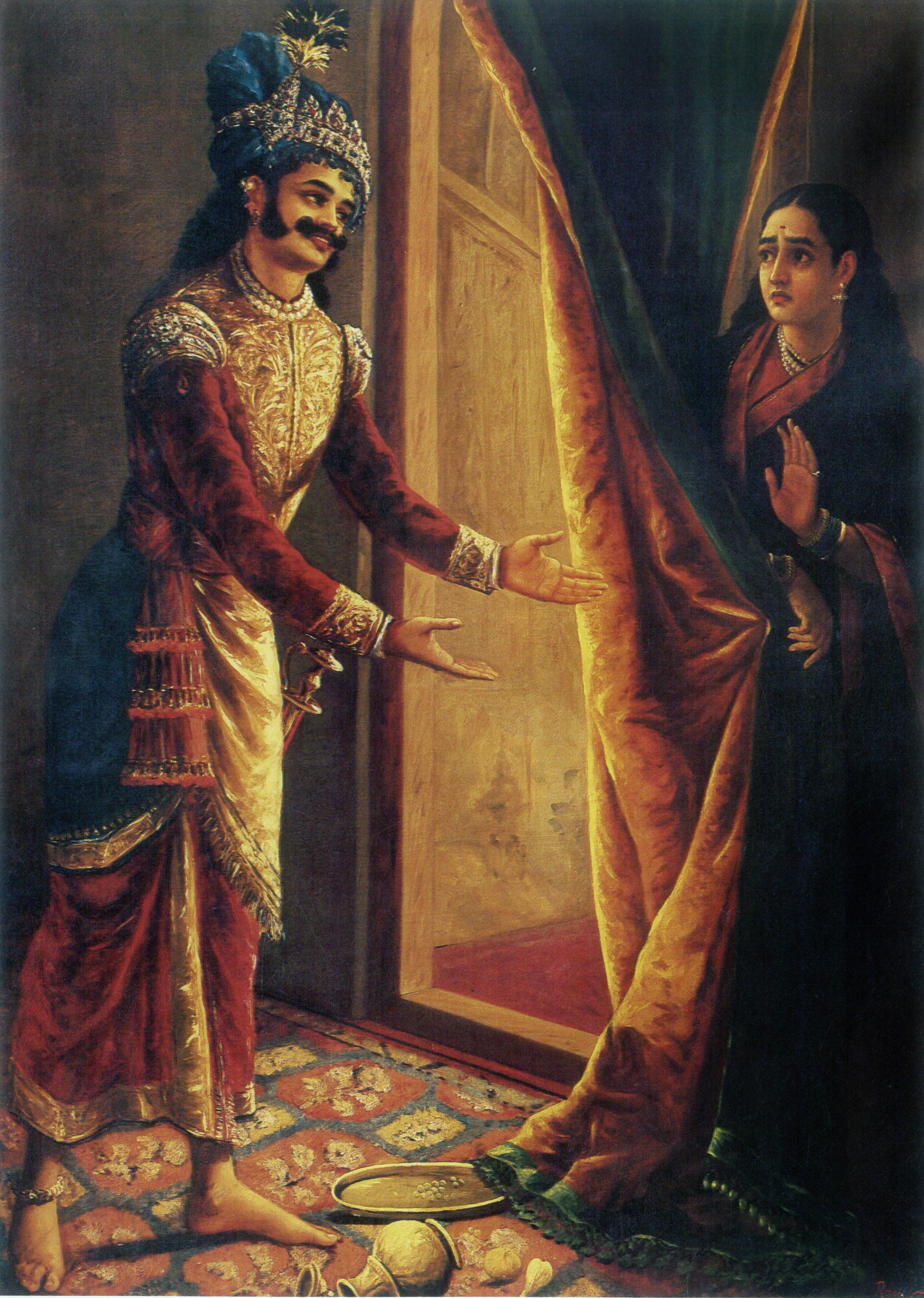
Painting of Keechaka and Draupadi by Raja Ravi Varma

R. Nataraja Mudaliar, a car dealer who was based in Madras, (Note: The city was renamed Chennai in 1996.) developed an interest in motion pictures after watching Dadasaheb Phalke's 1913 mythological film, Raja Harishchandra at the Gaiety theatre in Madras. The former then learned the basics of photography and filmmaking from Stewart Smith, a Poona-based British cinematographer who had worked on a documentary that chronicled the viceroyship of Lord Curzon (1899–1905). Nataraja Mudaliar bought a Williamson 35 mm camera and printer from Mooppanar, a wealthy landowner based in Thanjavur, for ₹1,800. (Note: The average exchange rate in 1917 was 13 Indian rupees (₹) per 1 US dollar (US$).) In 1915, he established the India Film Company, which was South India's first production company. He then set up a film studio on Miller's Road in Purasawalkam with the help of business associates who invested in his production house. (Note: According to Baskaran and Tamil feminist writer C. S. Lakshmi, the place where Nataraja Mudaliar founded the India Film Company was previously known as Tower House.)

Nataraja Mudaliar sought advice from his friend, theatrical artist Pammal Sambandha Mudaliar, who suggested that he depict the story of Draupadi and Keechaka from the Virata Parva segment of the Hindu epic Mahabharata. Some of Nataraja Mudaliar's relatives objected, feeling that it was an inappropriate story for his debut venture, but Sambandha Mudaliar persuaded him to proceed with making the film as audiences were familiar with the story. Attorney C. Rangavadivelu, a close friend of Nataraja Mudaliar, assisted him in writing the screenplay as the latter was not a writer by profession. The paintings of Raja Ravi Varma provided Nataraja Mudaliar with a source of inspiration for recreating the story on celluloid. Nataraja Mudaliar cast stage actors Raju Mudaliar and Jeevarathnam as Keechaka and Draupadi, respectively.

=== Filming ===
Keechaka Vadham was filmed on a budget of ₹35,000 (worth ₹6 crore in 2021 prices). Principal photography began in 1916–1917, and the film was shot over 35–37 days. (Note: While historian S. Muthiah wrote that principal photography began in 1917 and took five weeks (35 days) to complete, Pradeep Madhavan of Hindu Tamil Thisai estimated that Keechaka Vadham was shot over the course of 37 days. Nataraja Mudaliar said he began shooting the film c. the end of 1916.) Nataraja Mudaliar imported the film stock from London with the help of an Englishman named Carpenter, who worked for the Bombay division of the photographic technology company, Kodak. Film historian Randor Guy noted in his 1997 book Starlight Starbright: The Early Tamil Cinema that a thin white piece of cloth was used as a ceiling for filming and sunlight was filtered through it onto the floor. Rangavadivelu was also experienced in playing female roles on stage for the Suguna Vilasa Sabha, and coached the artists on set. The film's production, cinematography and editing were handled by Nataraja Mudaliar himself.

The film was shot with a speed of 16 frames per second, which was the standard rate for a silent film, at the India Film Company, with intertitles in English, Tamil and Hindi. The Tamil and Hindi intertitles were written by Sambandha Mudaliar and Devdas Gandhi respectively, while Nataraja Mudaliar wrote the English intertitles himself with the assistance of Guruswami Mudaliar and Thiruvengada Mudaliar, a professor from Pachaiyappa's College.

Keechaka Vadham was the first film made in South India; as the cast was Tamil, it is also the first Tamil film. According to Guy, Nataraja Mudaliar established a laboratory in Bangalore to process the film negatives since there was no film laboratory in Madras. Nataraja Mudaliar believed that Bangalore's colder climate "would be kind to his exposed film stock"; he processed the film negatives there each weekend and returned on Monday morning to resume filming. The film's final reel length was 6,000 ft (1,800 m).

== Release, reception and legacy ==
According to Muthiah, Keechaka Vadham was first released at the Elphinstone Theatre in Madras; the film netted ₹50,000 after being screened in India, Burma, Ceylon, the Federated Malay States and Singapore. The film yielded ₹15,000 which Muthiah noted to be a "tidy profit in those days." Writer Firoze Rangoonwalla notes that a reviewer for The Mail praised the film: "It has been prepared with great care and is drawing full houses". Guy pointed out that with the film's critical and commercial success, Nataraja Mudaliar had "created history". Since no print is known to have survived, it appears to be a lost film.

Keechaka Vadham's success inspired Nataraja Mudaliar to make a series of films based on Hindu mythology: Draupadi Vastrapaharanam (1918), Lava Kusa (1919), Shiva Leela (1919), Rukmini Satyabhama (1922) and Mahi Ravana (1923). He retired from filmmaking in 1923 after a fire killed his son and destroyed his production house. Nataraja Mudaliar is widely regarded as "the father of Tamil cinema," and his films helped lay the foundation for the South Indian cinema industry; his works inspired Raghupathi Surya Prakasa, the son of Raghupathi Venkaiah Naidu, and J. C. Daniel.

== See also ==
- Raja Harishchandra, the first Indian silent film
- Kalidas, the first sound film in Tamil and Telugu cinema
- List of lost films

== Bibliography ==
=== Books ===
- Baskaran, S. Theodore (15 December 2013) [1996]. The Eye of the Serpent: An Introduction To Tamil Cinema. Chennai: Westland Books. ISBN 978-93-83260-74-4.
- Buck, William (2000). Mahabharata. Delhi: Motilal Banarsidass Publications. ISBN 978-81-2081-719-7.
- Chabria, Suresh (2005). "Mudaliar, R. Nataraja". In Abel, Richard (ed.). Encyclopaedia of Hindi Cinema. Abingdon-on-Thames: Taylor & Francis. ISBN 978-0-415-23440-5.
- Guy, Randor (1997). Starlight, Starbright: The Early Tamil Cinema. Chennai: Amra Publishers. OCLC 52794531.
- Jacobsen, Knut A. (11 August 2015). Routledge Handbook of Contemporary India. Abingdon-on-Thames: Routledge. ISBN 978-1-317-40358-6.
- Lakshmi, C. S. (2004). The Unhurried City: Writings on Chennai. London: Penguin Books. ISBN 978-0-14-303026-3.
- Pattanaik, Devdutt (2010). Jaya: An Illustrated Retelling of the Mahabharata. London: Penguin Books. ISBN 978-0-14-310425-4.
- Pinto, Jerry; Srivastava, Rahul (2008). Talk of the Town. London: Penguin Books. ISBN 978-0-14-333013-4.
- Rajadhyaksha, Ashish; Willemen, Paul (2014) [1999]. Encyclopedia of Indian Cinema. Abingdon-on-Thames: Routledge. ISBN 978-1-135-94318-9.
- Rangoonwalla, Firoze (2003). "1896–1930: The Early Days". In Gulzar; Nihalani, Govind; Chatterjee, Saibal (eds.). Encyclopaedia of Hindi Cinema. Mumbai: Encyclopædia Britannica, Popular Prakashan. ISBN 978-81-7991-066-5.
- Thoraval, Yves (2000). The cinemas of India. London: Macmillan Publishers. ISBN 978-0-333-93410-4.
- Velayutham, Selvaraj (2008). Tamil Cinema: The Cultural Politics of India's other Film Industry. Abingdon-on-Thames: Taylor & Francis. ISBN 978-0-203-93037-3.

=== Newspapers ===
- Baskaran, S. Theodore (September 2011). "How old is Tamil Cinema?". Madras Musings. Vol. XXI, no. 10. Archived from the original on 28 October 2015.
- Baskaran, S. Theodore (30 January 2016). "From the shadows into the limelight". The Hindu. Archived from the original on 3 April 2017.
- Guy, Randor (10 July 2000). "The stamp of honour". The Hindu. Archived from the original on 18 September 2015.
- Guy, Randor (9 May 2002). "Remembering a pioneer". The Hindu. Archived from the original on 18 September 2015.
- Guy, Randor (December 2007). "A Miller's Road Film Pioneer" (PDF). Madras Musings. Vol. XVII, no. 16. p. 6. Archived (PDF) from the original on 28 October 2015.
- Guy, Randor (5 October 2013). "The forgotten heroes". The Hindu. Archived from the original on 18 September 2015.
- Madhavan, Pradeep (22 August 2014). "சென்னையும் சினிமாவும்: குதிரைகள் தயவால் உருவான கோடம்பாக்கம்!" [Chennai and cinema: Kodambakkam, a place that evolved with the help of horses!]. Hindu Tamil Thisai (in Tamil). Archived from the original on 9 August 2025.
- "He Founded the Motion Picture Industry in South India". The Madras Mail. 24 December 1936. Archived from the original on 24 March 2018.
- Muthiah, S. (7 September 2009). "The pioneer 'Tamil' film-maker". The Hindu. Archived from the original on 18 September 2015.
- Roy, Anjan (4 June 2013). "The mystery of India's purchasing power parity". The Shillong Times. Archived from the original on 13 August 2025.
- Subramanian, Anupama (29 May 2013). "Classics must be preserved, says B. Mahendra". Deccan Chronicle. Archived from the original on 28 October 2015.
- Suganth, M. (2 March 2012). "Black and white films in Kollywood". The Times of India. Archived from the original on 2 March 2018.
- Thakur, Atul (1 May 2010). "Gone Forever". The Times of India. Archived from the original on 14 August 2016.
- Venkatesan, Deepa (22 August 2014). "Madras Day: Tracing a city's transformation as Chennai turns 375". Daily News and Analysis. Archived from the original on 29 June 2017.

=== Websites ===
- Balakrishnan, V. (12 August 2015). "தமிழ் சினிமா முன்னோடிகள் (4) : ஆர். நடராஜ முதலியார்" [Pioneers of Tamil Cinema (4) : R. Nataraja Mudaliar]. Ananda Vikatan. Archived from the original on 9 March 2018.
- Film News Anandan (26 February 1998). "Tamil Cinema History – The Early Days". Indolink. Archived from the original on 28 October 2015.
- Vats, Rohit (1 March 2013). "100 Years of Indian Cinema: The founding fathers". News18.
