= Sadanam Krishnadas Nair =

Kathakali actor

- Born: 10 May 1969; Koonathara, Palakkad, Kerala
- Died: 18 March 2018 (aged 48)
- Occupations: Kathakali Actor, Actor

Sadanam Krishnadas Nair (1969-2018) was a well-known actor of Kathakali from the Palakkad district of Kerala, in South India. He was born on 10 May 1969 in the village of Koonathara near Shoranur. He was joined at Sadanam Kathakali academy in the month of June 1983 and started training under Kalanilayam Balakrishnan. He has also received traditional training from the Kathakali actor-scholar Keezhpadam Kumaran Nair at the same school. Sadanam Krishnadas has made his first appearance on the stage in 1983 October, in the role of Krishna. From 1984 until his death, he had been working as a Kathakali actor with the school's Kathakali troupe, various clubs and festivals all over India and in several foreign countries. Krishnadas served in his alma mater Sadanam for years and he was a prominent Kathakali actor to work with in leading roles in the repertory or the newly written stories. Kathakali fans in northern kerala as well as in southern kerala, appreciate Krishnadas Nair's wide range and performances in leading anti-hero roles such as Ravana, Keechaka, Duryodhana (also called Kathi characters), Hanuman (white beard, vella thadi character), Kattalan (black beard, karutha thadi), Chuvanna thadi (red beard character), Pacha (the green or noble characters). He died on 19 March 2018, aged just 49.
