= Tamil cinema =

Segment of Indian cinema

- No. of screens: 1546 (Tamil Nadu and Pondicherry) (2022)
- Main distributors: 2D Entertainment; AGS Entertainment; AVM Productions; Aascar Films; Avni Cinemax; Dream Warrior Pictures; Gemini Film Circuit; Kavithalayaa Productions; Lakshmi Movie Makers; Lyca Productions; Madras Talkies; Modern Theatres; National Pictures; Raaj Kamal Films International; Red Giant Movies; Sathya Jyothi Films; Seven Screen Studio; Sri Surya Movies; Studio Green; Sun Pictures; Super Good Films; Thenandal Studio Limited; V Creations; Vijaya Vauhini Studios; Wunderbar Films

Produced feature films (2022)
- Total: 221

Tamil cinema is the segment of Indian cinema dedicated to the production of motion pictures in the Tamil language, the main spoken language in the state of Tamil Nadu. It is nicknamed Kollywood, a portmanteau of the names Kodambakkam—a Chennai neighbourhood with a high concentration of film studios, and Hollywood.

The first Tamil silent film, Keechaka Vadham, was directed by R. Nataraja Mudaliar in 1918. The first Tamil talking feature film, Kalidas, a multilingual directed by H. M. Reddy was released on 31 October 1931, less than seven months after India's first talking motion picture Alam Ara. Tamil cinema has been noted for its advanced narratives and diverse films, with several productions in the 1990s and early 2000s cutting across ethnic and linguistic barriers. Such films include Roja (1992), Bombay (1995), Indian (1996) and Enthiran (2010). Tamil cinema has since produced some of the most commercially successful actors, directors and films of Indian cinema.

By the end of the 1930s, the legislature of the State of Madras passed the Entertainment Tax Act of 1939. Madras (now Chennai), then became a secondary hub for Hindi cinema, other South Indian film industries, as well as for Sri Lankan cinema. Over the last quarter of the 20th century, Tamil films established a global presence, enjoying strong box office collections among Tamil-speaking audiences in Sri Lanka, Malaysia, and Singapore. Tamil films are also distributed throughout the Middle East, Oceania, Europe, North America, parts of Africa, and Japan. The industry also inspired independent filmmaking among Tamil diaspora populations in Sri Lanka, Malaysia, Singapore, and the West.

== History ==
=== Early exhibitors ===
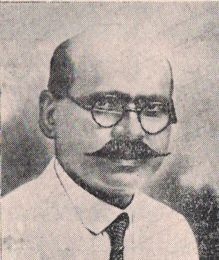
Samikannu Vincent

M. Edwards first screened a selection of silent films at the Victoria Public Hall in Madras in 1897 during the British Raj. The selected films all featured non-fictional subjects; they were mostly photographed records of day-to-day events. The film scholar Stephen Hughes points out that within a few years there were regular ticketed shows in a hall in Pophams Broadway, started by one Mrs. Klug, but this lasted only for a few months. Once it was demonstrated as a commercial proposition, a Western entrepreneur, Warwick Major, built the first cinema theatre, the Electric Theatre, which still stands. It was a favourite haunt of the British community in Madras. The theatre was shut down after a few years. This building is now part of a post office complex on Anna Salai (Mount Road). The Lyric Theatre was also built in the Mount Road area. This venue boasted a variety of events, including plays in English, Western classical music concerts, and ballroom dances. Silent films were also screened as an additional attraction. Swamikannu Vincent, a railway draftsman from Tiruchirapalli, became a travelling exhibitor in 1905. He showed short movies in a tent in Esplanade, near the present Parry's Corner, using carbide jet-burners for projection. He bought the film projector and silent films from the Frenchman Du Pont and set up a business as film exhibitor. Soon, he tied up with Pathé, a well-known pioneering film-producing company, and imported projectors. This helped new cinema houses to sprout across the presidency. In later years, he produced talkies and also built a cinema in Coimbatore.

To celebrate the event of King George V's visit in 1909, a grand exhibition was organised in Madras. Its major attraction was the screening of short films accompanied by sound. A British company imported a Crone megaphone, made up of a film projector to which a gramophone with a disc containing prerecorded sound was linked, and both were run in unison, producing picture and sound simultaneously. However, there was no synched dialogue. Raghupathi Venkaiah Naidu, a successful photographer, took over the equipment after the exhibition and set up a tent cinema near the Madras High Court. With this equipment, he screened the short films Pearl Fish and Raja's Casket in the Victoria Public Hall. When this proved successful, he screened the films in a tent set up in Esplanade. These tent events were the true precursors of the cinema shows. Naidu travelled with this unit to Burma (now Myanmar) and Sri Lanka, and when he had gathered enough money, he put up a permanent cinema house in Madras—Gaiety, in 1914, the first cinema house in Madras to be built by an Indian. He soon added two more, Crown Theatre in Mint and Globe (later called Roxy) in Purasawalkam.

Swamikannu Vincent, who had built one of the first cinema halls of South India in Coimbatore, introduced the concept of "Tent Cinema" in which a tent was erected on a stretch of open land close to a town or village to screen the films. The first of its kind was established in Madras, called "Edison's Grand Cinemamegaphone". This was due to the fact that electric carbons were used for motion picture projectors.

Most of the films screened then were shorts made in the United States and Britain. In 1909, an Englishman, T. H. Huffton, founded Peninsular Film Services in Madras and produced some short films for local audiences. But soon, hour-long films, which narrated dramatic stories, then known as "drama films", were imported. From 1912 onwards, feature films made in Bombay (now Mumbai) were also screened in Madras. The era of short films had ended. The arrival of drama films firmly established cinema as a popular entertainment form. More cinema houses came up in the city.

Fascinated by this new entertainment form, an automobile dealer in the Thousand Lights area of Madras, R. Nataraja Mudaliyar, decided to venture into film production. After a few days' training in Pune with the cinematographer Stewart Smith, the official cinematographer of Lord Curzon's 1903 Durbar, he started a film production concern in 1916.

The man who truly laid the foundations of Tamil cinema was A. Narayanan. After a few years in film distribution, he set up a production company in Madras, the General Pictures Corporation, popularly known as GPC. Beginning with The Faithful Wife/Dharmapathini (1929), GPC made about 24 feature films. GPC functioned as a film school and its alumni included names such as Sundara Rao Nadkarni and Jiten Banerji. The studio of GPC was housed in the Chellapalli bungalow on Thiruvottiyur High Road in Madras. This company, which produced the most Tamil silent films, had branches in Colombo, Rangoon and Singapore.

The Ways of Vishnu/Vishnu Leela, which R. Prakasa made in 1932, was the last silent film produced in Madras. The silent era of south Indian cinema has not been documented well. When the talkies appeared, film producers had to travel to Bombay or Calcutta to make films. Most films of this early period were celluloid versions of well-known stage plays. Company dramas were popular among the Madras audience. The legendary Otraivadai drama theatre had been built in 1872 itself in Mint. Many drama halls had come up in the city where short silent films were screened in the afternoon and plays were enacted in the night.

The scene changed in 1934 when Madras got its first sound studio. By this time, all the cinema houses in Madras had been wired for sound. Narayanan, who had been active during the silent era, founded Srinivasa Cinetone in which his wife worked as the sound recordist. Srinivasa Kalyanam (1934), directed by Narayanan, was the first sound film (talkie) produced in Madras. The second sound studio to come up in Madras was Vel Pictures, started by M. D. Rajan on Eldams Road in the Dunmore bungalow, which belonged to the Raja of Pithapuram. Before long, more sound studios came up. Thirty-six talkies were made in Madras in 1935.

=== Influences ===
The main impacts of the early cinema were the cultural influences of the country. The Tamil-language was the medium in which many plays and stories were written since the ages as early as the Cholas. They were highly stylised and nature of the spectacle was one which could attract the people. Along with this, music and dance were one of the main entertainment sources.

There is a strong Indian tradition of narrating mythology, history, fairy tales and so on through song and dance. Whereas Hollywood filmmakers strove to conceal the constructed nature of their work so that the realistic narrative was wholly dominant, Indian filmmakers made no attempt to conceal the fact that what was shown on the screen was a creation, an illusion, a fiction. However, they demonstrated how this creation intersected with people's day-to-day lives in complex ways. By the end of the 1930s, the State of Madras legislature passed the Entertainment Tax Act 1939.

=== Studios ===
In 1916, a studio, the first in south India, was set up in Madras at 10 Millers Road, Kilpauk. He called it the India Film Company. Rangavadivelu, an actor from Suguna Vilasa Sabha, a theatre company then, was hired to train the actors. Thirty-five days later, the first feature film made in south India, The Extermination of Keechakan/Keechakavatham, based on an episode from the Mahabharata, was released produced and directed by R. Nataraja, who established the India Film Company Limited.

Despite a century of increasing box office takings, Tamil cinema remains informal. Nevertheless, there are few exceptions like Modern Theatres, Gemini Studios, AVM and Sri Thenandal Films that survived beyond 100 productions.

=== Exhibitor strike 2017 ===
In 2017, opposing the dual taxation of GST (28%) and entertainment tax (30%), Tamilnadu Theatre Owners Association announced indefinite closure of all cinemas in the state from 3 July 2017. The strike has been called off and the cinemas will be playing the movies starting Friday 7 July 2017. Government has formed a committee to decide on the existence of state's 30% entertainment tax. It was reported that, per day business loss during the strike was around ₹ 20 crores.

== Distribution ==
Annual admissions in Chennai multiplexes and single screens averaged 1.1 crore tickets with a standard deviation of ±10 lakh tickets during 2011–16. The Chennai film industry produced the first nationally distributed film across India in 1948 with Chandralekha. They have one of the widest overseas distribution, with large audience turnout from the Tamil diaspora. They are distributed to various parts of Asia, Africa, Western Europe, North America and Oceania.

Many successful Tamil films have been remade by other film industries. It is estimated by the Manorama Yearbook 2000 (a popular almanac) that over 5,000 Tamil films were produced in the 20th century. Tamil films have also been dubbed into other languages, thus reaching a much wider audience. There has been a growing presence of English in dialogue and songs in Chennai films. It is not uncommon to see movies that feature dialogue studded with English words and phrases, or even whole sentences. Some movies are also simultaneously made in two or three languages (either using subtitles or several soundtracks). Chennai's film composers have popularised their highly unique, syncretic style of film music across the world. Quite often, Tamil movies feature Madras Tamil, a colloquial version of Tamil spoken in Chennai.

=== Tamil film distribution territories ===
Territory	Maximum Business (%)	Division
NS	20	4 districts – Cuddalore, Tiruvannamalai, Vellore and Viluppuram
Chengalpattu	100	3 districts - Chengalpattu, Kanchipuram, Tiruvallur
Coimbatore	50	4 Western districts – Coimbatore, Erode, Nilgiris and Tiruppur
Chennai	37	1 Northern district – Chennai
MR	35	6 Southern districts – Dindigul, Madurai, Ramanathapuram, Sivaganga, Theni and Virudhunagar
TT	32	8 Central districts – Ariyalur, Karur, Nagapattinam, Perambalur, Pudukkottai, Thanjavur, Tiruchirappalli and Tiruvarur
Salem	28	4 Western districts – Dharmapuri, Krishnagiri, Namakkal and Salem
TK	13	3 Southern districts – Thoothukudi, Tirunelveli and Kanyakumari
Karnataka	83	
Andhra Pradesh	79	
Telangana	63	
Kerala	63	
Rest of India	15	
Sri Lanka	68	
US and Canada	119	
GCC	106	
Malaysia	82	
Rest of the world	89	

=== The rest of India ===
Keechaka Vadham (1918) was the first silent film made in South India. Kalidas (1931) was the first Tamil talkie film made in 1931. Kalava (1932) was the first full-length talkie made entirely in Tamil. Nandanar (1935) was the first film for American film director Ellis R. Dungan. Balayogini released in 1937 was considered to be first children's film of South India. It is estimated by the Manorama Yearbook 2000 (a popular almanac) that over 5,000 Tamil films were produced in the 20th century. Tamil films have also been dubbed into other languages, thus reaching a much wider audience. There has been a growing presence of English in dialogue and songs in Chennai films.

In 1991, Marupakkam directed by K.S. Sethu Madhavan, became the first Tamil film to win the National Film Award for Best Feature Film, the feat was repeated by Kanchivaram in 2007. Tamil films enjoy significant patronage in neighbouring Indian states like Kerala, Karnataka, Andhra Pradesh, Maharashtra, Gujarat and New Delhi. In Kerala and Karnataka the films are directly released in Tamil but in Telangana and Andhra Pradesh they are generally dubbed into Telugu where they have a decent market.

=== International ===
Tamil films have enjoyed consistent popularity among populations in South East Asia. Since Chandralekha, Muthu was the second Tamil film to be dubbed into Japanese (as Mutu: Odoru Maharaja) and grossed a record $1.6 million in 1998. In 2010, Enthiran grossed a record $4 million in North America.

Many Tamil-language films have premiered or have been selected as special presentations at various film festivals across the globe, such as Mani Ratnam's Kannathil Muthamittal (2002), Vasanthabalan's Veyyil (2006) and Ameer Sultan's Paruthiveeran (2007). Kanchivaram (2009) was selected to be premiered at the Toronto International Film Festival. Tamil films have been a part of films submitted by India for the Academy Award for Best Foreign Language on eight occasions, next only to Hindi. Mani Ratnam's Nayakan (1987) was included in Time magazine's "All-TIME" 100 best movies list.

== Economics ==
Average annual film output in Tamil film industry peaked in 1985. The Tamil film market accounts for approximately 0.1% of the gross domestic product (GDP) of the state of Tamil Nadu. For the purpose of entertainment taxes, returns have to be filed by the exhibitors weekly (usually each Tuesday).

The Government of Tamil Nadu made provisions for an entertainment tax exemption for Tamil films having titles in words from the Tamil-language only. This is in accordance with Government Order 72 passed on 22 July 2006. The first film to be released after the new Order was Unakkum Enakkum. The original title had been Something Something Unakkum Ennakkum, a half-English and a half-Tamil title. In July 2011, strict norms on entertainment tax were passed which stated that films which were given a "U" certificate by the Central Board of Film Certification alone were eligible for tax exemption and those with an "A" certificate could not fit into this category.

There are three major roles in the Tamil film value chain viz producer, distributor and exhibitor. The distributor purchases theatrical distribution rights from the producer for exhibiting the film in a defined territory. The distributor performs enhanced functions such as:

1. part-financing of film (in case of minimum guarantee / advance based purchase of film rights)
2. localised marketing of film
3. selection of exhibition halls
4. managing the logistics of physical print distribution

There are three popular approaches to transfer of distribution rights via distribution contracts:

1. Minimum Guarantee + Royalty – Here, the producer sells the distribution rights for a defined territory for a minimum lump sum irrespective of the box office performance of the film. Any surplus is shared between the producer and distributor, in a pre-set ratio (typically 1:2) after deducting tax, show rentals, commission, print costs and publicity costs. Effectively, the distributor becomes a financier in the eyes of the market. This is the most common channel available to high budget producers.
2. Commission – Here, the distributor pays the producer the entire box office collection after deducting commission. So, the entire risk of box office performance of the film remains with the producer. This is the most common channel available to low budget producers. By the first decade of 21st century, about 90 per cent of the films were released on commission basis.
3. Outright Sale – Here, the producer sells all distribution and theatrical exhibition rights for a defined territory exclusively to a distributor. Effectively, the distributor becomes a producer in the eyes of the market. So, the entire risk of box office performance of the film remains with the distributor.

There are four popular approaches to transfer of exhibition rights via exhibition contracts:

1. Theatre Hire – Here, the exhibitor pays the distributor the entire box office collection after deducting tax and show rentals. So, the entire risk of box office performance of the film remains with the distributor. This is the most common channel for low-budget films, casting rank newcomers, with unproven track record. In Chennai, a moderate theatre with AC and DTS can fetch around ₹1 lakh as weekly rent.
2. Fixed Hire – Here, the exhibitor pays the distributor a maximum lump sum irrespective of the box office performance of the film. Rental is not chargeable per show. Any surplus after deducting tax is retained by the exhibitor. Effectively, the exhibitor becomes a distributor in the eyes of the market. So, the entire risk of box office performance of the film remains with the exhibitor.
3. Minimum Guarantee + Royalty – Here, the exhibitor pays the distributor a minimum lump sum irrespective of the box office performance of the film. Rental is not chargeable per show. Any surplus after deducting tax and show rental is shared in a pre-set ratio (1:2) between the distributor and exhibitor typically.
4. Revenue Share – Here, the distributor shares with the exhibitor, in a pre-set ratio (typically 1:1), the entire box office collection of the film after deducting tax. Rental is not chargeable per show. So, the entire risk of box office performance of the film is shared between the exhibitor and distributor. This is the most common channel preferred by multiplex screens.

=== Highest-grossing Tamil films by year ===
Year	Title	Director	Studio	ref(s)
2025	Coolie	Lokesh Kanagaraj	Sun Pictures
2024	The Greatest of All Time	Venkat Prabhu	AGS Entertainment
2023	Leo	Lokesh kanagaraj	Seven Screen Studio
2022	Ponniyin Selvan: I	Mani Ratnam	Lyca Productions, Madras Talkies
2021	Master	Lokesh Kanagaraj	XB Film Creators
2020	Darbar	AR Murugadoss	Lyca Productions
2019	Bigil	Atlee	AGS Entertainment
2018	2.0	S. Shankar	Lyca Productions
2017	Mersal	Atlee	Thenandal Studio Limited
2016	Kabali	Pa. Ranjith	V.Creations
2015	I	S. Shankar	Aascar Films Pvt. Ltd.
2014	Lingaa	K. S. Ravikumar	Lyca Productions
2013	Vishwaroopam	Kamal Haasan	Raaj Kamal Films International
2012	Thuppaki	A.R. Murugadoss	V. Creations
2011	7 Aum Arivu	AR Murugadoss	Red Giant Movies
2010	Enthiran	S. Shankar	Sun Pictures
2009	Ayan	K.V. Anand	AVM Productions
2008	Dasavathaaram	K. S. Ravikumar	Aascar Film Pvt. Ltd
2007	Sivaji	S. Shankar	AVM Productions
2006	Varalaru	K. S. Ravikumar	Nic Arts
2005	Chandramukhi	P. Vasu	Sivaji Productions
2004	Ghilli	Dharani	Sri Surya Movies
2003	Saamy	Hari	Kavithalayaa Productions
2002	Baba	Suresh Krissna	Lotus International
2001	Dheena	A.R. Murugadoss	Vijayam Cine Combines
2000	Vaanathaippola	Vikraman	Aascar Film Pvt. Ltd
1999	Padayappa	K. S. Ravikumar	Arunachala Cine Creations
1998	Jeans	S.Shankar	Amritraj Solomon Communications
1997	Arunachalam*	Sundar C	Annamalai Cine Combines
1996	Indian	S.Shankar	Sri Surya Movies
1995	Baashha	Suresh Krissna	Sathya Movies
1994	Nattamai	K. S. Ravikumar	Super Good Films
1993	Walter Vetrivel*	P. Vasu	Kamalam Movies
1992	Annaamalai	Suresh Krissna	Kavithalayaa Productions
1990	Michael Madana Kama Rajan|	Singeetam Srinivasa Rao	P. A. Art Productions
1989	Apoorva Sagodharargal	Singeetam Srinivasa Rao	Raaj Kamal Films International
1986	Vikram	Rajasekhar	Raaj Kamal Films International
1985	Padikkadavan*	Rajasekhar	Sri Eswari Productions
1984	Nallavanuku Nallavan*	SP. Muthuraman	AVM Productions
1982	Sakalakala Vallavan*	SP. Muthuraman	AVM Productions
1981	Sattam Oru Iruttarai*	S. A. Chandrasekhar	Vadularan Combines
1980	Billa	R. Krishnamoorthy	Suresh Arts
1979	Thirisoolam	K. Vijayan	Sivaji Productions
1978	Thyagam	K. Vijayan	Sujatha Cine Arts
1977	16 Vayathinile	Bharathiraja	S.A.Rajkannu
1974	Thangappathakkam	P. Madhavan	Sivaji Productions
1972	Vasantha Maligai	K. S. Prakash Rao	Vijaya Suresh Combines
1971	Rickshawkaran*	M. Krishnan Nair	Sathya Movies
1968	Thillana Mohanambal	A. P. Nagarajan	Sri Vijayalakshmi Pictures
1966	Anbe Vaa*	A. C. Tirulokchandar	AVM Productions
1965	Enga Veettu Pillai	Tapi Chanakya	Vijaya Vauhini Studios
1959	Veerapandiya Kattabomman	B. R. Panthulu	Padmini Pictures
1958	Nadodi Mannan	M. G. Ramachandran	MGR Pictures
1956	Madurai Veeran	D. Yoganand	Krishna Pictures
1955	Missiamma*	L. V. Prasad	Vijaya Vauhini Studios
1954	Malaikkallan	S. M. Sriramulu Naidu	Pakshiraja Studios
1952	Parasakthi	Krishnan–Panju	P. A. Perumal Mudaliar
1948	Chandralekha	S. S. Vasan	Gemini Studios

== Legislation ==
Film studios in Chennai are bound by legislation, such as the Cinematography Film Rules of 1948, the Cinematography Act of 1952, and the Copyright Act of 1957. In Tamil Nadu, cinema ticket prices are regulated by the government. Single screen theatres may charge a maximum of ₹50, while theatres with more than three screens may charge a maximum of ₹120 per ticket.

== Awards ==
- Filmfare Awards South
- IIFA Utsavam
- Mirchi Music Awards South
- Toronto Tamil Film Festival
- SIIMA Awards
- Norway Tamil Film Festival Awards
- Tamil Nadu State Film Awards
- Vijay Awards
- International Tamil Film Awards
- Kalaimamani
- Edison Awards
- Ananda Vikatan Cinema Awards
- South Scope Awards

== See also ==
- Cinema of the world
- Cinema of India
- Earliest color films in South India
- List of highest-grossing Indian films
- List of Tamil actors
- List of Tamil film actors
- List of Tamil film actresses
- List of Tamil music directors
- Tamil cinema and Dravidian politics
- List of highest-grossing Tamil films
- Lists of Tamil-language films
