= Ajnatavasa =

Special period of exile in Mahabharata

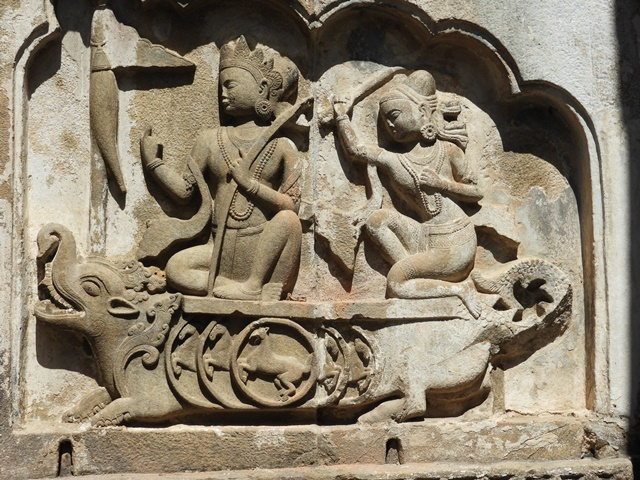
Arjuna disguised as Brihannala and prince Uttara depicted on a chariot as they recover the cattle stolen by enemy.

Ajnatavasa (Sanskrit: अज्ञातवास, ajñātavāsa, lit. "living in obscurity" or "unknown abode") refers to the thirteenth year of exile undertaken by the Pandavas, the protagonists of the Hindu epic Mahabharata. This period, detailed in The Book of Virata (Virata Parva), required the five Pandava brothers—Yudhishthira, Bhima, Arjuna, Nakula, and Sahadeva—along with their wife Draupadi, to live incognito after spending twelve years in forest exile. The condition, stipulated after Yudhishthira’s loss in a game of dice against the Kauravas, mandated that they remain unrecognized in a populated area; if discovered, they would face an additional twelve years of exile.

== Background ==
The Pandavas—Yudhishthira, Bhima, Arjuna, Nakula, and Sahadeva—along with their wife, Draupadi, were exiled after losing a rigged dice game to the Kauravas in the Sabha Parva (The Book of the Assembly Hall). As per the agreement, they had to endure twelve years in the forest, followed by a year of living incognito. If their identities were discovered during this period, the cycle of exile would restart.

The legitimacy of their exile's conclusion becomes a matter of debate in the Virata Parva, with Bhishma, the Kuru patriarch, applying astronomical calculations to determine whether the Pandavas had truly completed the stipulated time. His argument is based on the intercalary system of the Vedic calendar, which incorporates additional months every five years to align with solar and lunar cycles. He concludes that thirteen years include an additional five months and twelve days, affirming that the Pandavas had fulfilled their obligation.

== The Pandavas in Disguise ==
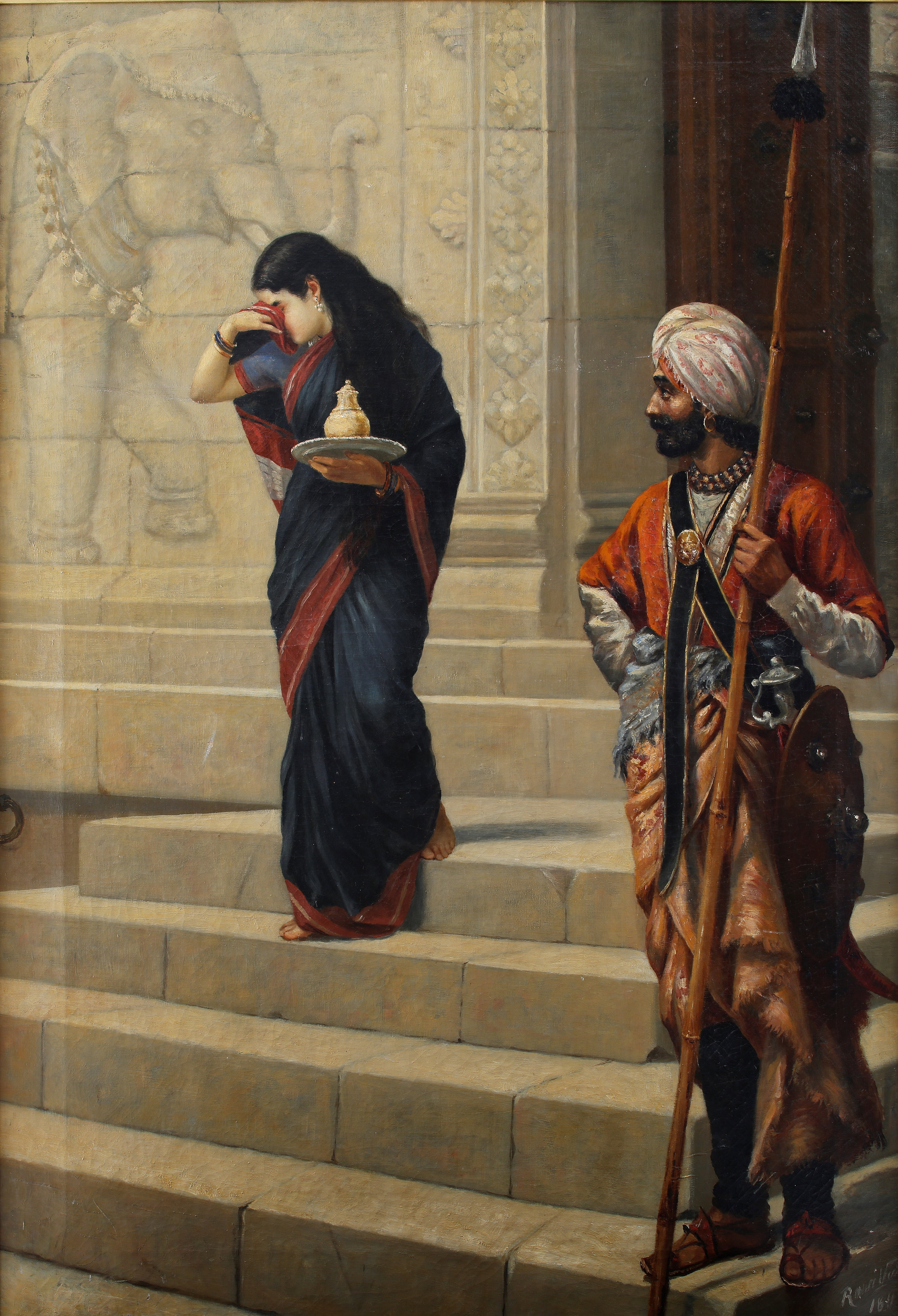
Draupadi disguised as Sairandhri going to the court of Kichaka carrying a jar of wine, painting by Raja Ravi Varma

During Ajnatavasa, the Pandavas and Draupadi reside in the kingdom of Matsya, ruled by King Virata, adopting disguises to conceal their identities. Their chosen roles reflect a blend of practicality and symbolic inversion, reminiscent of carnival-like traditions:

- Yudhishthira assumes the name Kanka and serves as a courtier and dicing master to King Virata. His choice humorously echoes his past gambling misfortune, tempered by a boon from sage Brihadashva granting him skill in dice.
- Bhima, under the alias Ballava ("cowherd"), becomes a cook and wrestler in Virata’s court. Known for his prodigious appetite, Bhima’s role in the kitchen aligns with his strength and love of food.
- Arjuna, adopting the feminine name Brihannada ("large reed"), disguises himself as a transvestite dance teacher. Having learned music and dance from the Gandharva Chitrasena during his time in Indra’s heaven, Arjuna teaches these arts to Virata’s daughter, Uttara.
- Nakula, as Granthika, works as a horse groom, leveraging his prior experience with cattle and horses in the Pandava kingdom.
- Sahadeva, named Tantipala ("guardian of the rope"), tends to Virata’s cattle, reflecting his pastoral skills.
- Draupadi, calling herself Sairandhri, becomes a chambermaid and hairdresser to Queen Sudeshna, Virata’s wife. Her role isolates her from her husbands, emphasizing her independence during this period.

The Pandavas also receive secret names—Jaya, Jayanta, Vijaya, Jayatsena, and Jayadbala—all meaning "victory," which serve as recognition signals among them. These disguises, while not altering their physical appearances (e.g., Arjuna’s bowstring scars remain visible), test their adaptability and resilience.

== Events of Ajnatavasa ==
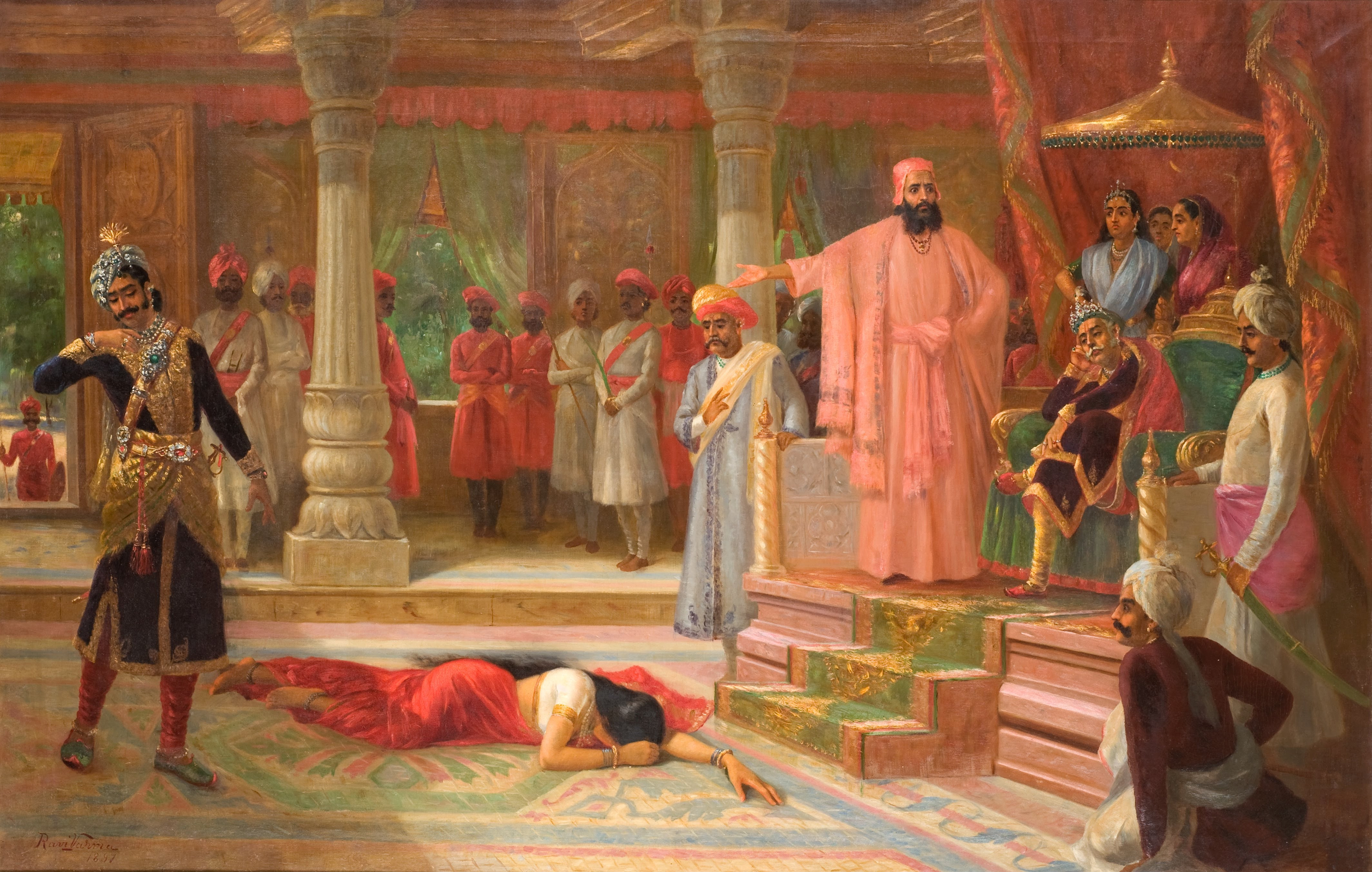
Draupadi as humiliated in Virata's court by Kichaka (left), painted by Raja Ravi Varma

After completing their twelve-year forest exile, Yudhishthira consulted Arjuna to select a place to spend their thirteenth year of incognito exile. Arjuna listed several kingdoms, and Yudhishthira chose the Matsya kingdom ruled by King Virata. The Pandavas entered Matsya disguised as hunters after passing through Surasena.

Each of the Pandavas, along with Draupadi, assumed new identities to conceal their royal lineage. Yudhishthira, as Kanka, was taken into Virata’s court as a Brahmin and master of dice. Bhima, under the name Ballava, was accepted as a cook. Draupadi became a maidservant to Queen Sudeshna, persuading the queen to employ her by claiming to be married to five Gandharvas. Sahadeva presented himself as Tantipala, a cowherd, and Nakula as Granthika, a horse groom. Arjuna, disguised as a woman named Brihannala, offered his services as a dance instructor. In these roles, the Pandavas supported themselves while maintaining their concealment.

Ten months after, Kichaka, the powerful commander and brother to Queen Sudeshna, developed an obsession with Draupadi and assaulted her. Bhima avenged her by killing Kichaka in a brutal fight. In retaliation, Kichaka's kin attempted to immolate Draupadi, but Bhima intervened and killed over a hundred of them. In the aftermath, spies from Hastinapura reported Kichaka’s death to Duryodhana. Suspecting the Pandavas might be hiding in Matsya, the Kauravas, together with their allies the Trigartas, initiated a double cattle raid. Susarman, king of the Trigartas, launched the first attack. Virata, unaware of the true identities of the Pandavas, enlisted them—except Arjuna—to defend the kingdom. Bhima captured Susarman and freed the king, who offered to anoint Yudhishthira as ruler, but was persuaded instead to proclaim victory in the city.

Simultaneously, the Kauravas raided more cattle. Virata’s son, Prince Uttara, boasted he would confront the Kauravas alone, but panicked when he saw their army. Draupadi suggested Brihannala as his charioteer. Arjuna recovered his weapons, revealed his identity to Uttara, and rode out. In the ensuing battle, Arjuna single-handedly defeated numerous Kaurava warriors, including Kripa, Drona, Karna, Bhishma, and Ashvatthaman. He routed the enemy forces, collected garments from the fallen warriors, and directed Uttara to proclaim the victory in his own name.

As Virata and the Pandavas returned victorious, Virata was informed that his son had gone out to face the Kauravas. Disturbed, he prepared to send reinforcements. Yudhishthira reassured him, saying that with Brihannala at his side, Uttara could not lose. When Uttara’s return was announced, Virata organised a jubilant welcome. The king, exhilarated, invited Yudhishthira to a game of dice, which the latter reluctantly accepted while warning of the dangers of gambling. During the game, Virata repeatedly praised Uttara, but Yudhishthira credited Brihannala. Annoyed, Virata threw the dice at Yudhishthira, injuring his nose. Draupadi quietly brought a golden bowl to prevent the blood from touching the ground, which would have been seen as a bad omen. When Uttara and Brihannala arrived, Yudhishthira asked that Arjuna remain outside to avoid his seeing the bloodied injury.

Two days later, the Pandavas donned royal garments and sat on thrones in the court. Virata was astonished and questioned their identities. Arjuna revealed Yudhishthira’s royal status and introduced the other brothers. Uttara described Arjuna’s martial feats. Deeply apologetic, Virata offered his daughter Uttara in marriage. Arjuna accepted her on behalf of his son Abhimanyu, thus forging a marital alliance between the Pandavas and the Matsya kingdom.

== Themes and Cultural Parallels ==
The concept of Ajnatavasa aligns with broader cultural and mythological motifs of disguise, exile, and role reversals. Scholars have drawn comparisons between the Pandavas’ masquerade and ancient Indian festivals like Holi and Kama Utsava, which temporarily subvert social hierarchies. The festivities associated with the Vedic New Year often involved role reversals and transgressive behaviors, paralleling the Pandavas’ temporary shifts in status and identity.

Additionally, the number twelve in Indian tradition is frequently associated with the cycle of the year, leading some scholars to speculate that the twelve-year exile symbolized a grand cosmic cycle. The thirteenth year, in this interpretation, represents a liminal phase, akin to transitional periods in ritual and mythological structures.

The term "Ajnatavasa" itself, derived from Sanskrit ajñāta ("unknown") and vāsa ("abode"), underscores the theme of anonymity. In broader Indian literature, it symbolizes a period of concealment or self-imposed obscurity, often undertaken by figures in exile or penance.

== Scholarly Debate ==
The episode of Ajnātavāsa spend in the court of Virata—has drawn considerable scholarly attention due to questions surrounding its narrative function and historical development within the Mahabharata. Scholars have long debated whether this section, enshrined in The Book of Virata, constitutes a later addition to the epic's core. Elements such as the prominence of the goddess Durga, referred to by her Puranic epithet mahāmuṇḍamardinī, and the anachronistic depiction of Arjuna’s bow Gandiva being wielded for sixty-five years, have been cited as evidence of textual layering and interpolation.

E. Washburn Hopkins notably argued for the lateness of the Virāṭaparvan, using linguistic and thematic cues to highlight inconsistencies with earlier narrative structures. These include the abrupt insertion of the Durga hymn and the portrayal of Arjuna as both youthful and yet retrospectively experienced, as indicated by the improbable timeline associated with his weaponry.

In engaging with such assessments, J. A. B. van Buitenen offered a more moderated view. While he acknowledged the likelihood that The Book of Virata is a later development, he questioned the methodology of outright rejection of interpolations. Van Buitenen proposed that additions like the Ajnatavasa episode may have originated organically from narrative gaps in earlier material—such as the unexplained presence of the Pandavas in Matsya—and thus represent narrative expansions rather than arbitrary insertions. Moreover, he suggested that Virata fulfills a symbolic and structural role within the epic. Its emphasis on disguise, role reversal, and festivity evokes cultural themes associated with the seasonal transition at the month of Phalguni. In this light, Ajnatavasa functions as a pivot between the end of exile and the onset of war, reinforcing the epic’s broader themes of transformation and continuity.
