= Cinema of South India =

Southern Indian cinema industries

Cinema of South India, refers to the cinema of the four major film industries in South India; primarily engaged in making feature films in the four major languages of the region, namely—Telugu, Tamil, Kannada and Malayalam. They are often colloquially referred to as Tollywood, Kollywood, Sandalwood and Mollywood, respectively.

Although the four industries developed independently for a long period of time, gross exchange of artists and technicians, as well as globalisation helped to shape this new identity. By 2010, South India became the home for 6320, or about 62% of the 10,167 cinema theatres in India.

In 2021, the Telugu film industry emerged as the largest film industry of India in terms of box office revenue. In 2022, Telugu cinema represented 20% of Indian box office revenue, followed by Tamil representing 14%, Kannada representing 5%, and Malayalam representing 8%. As of 2022, the combined revenue of South Indian film industries has surpassed that of the Mumbai-based Hindi-language film industry (Bollywood).

Setting aside state language boundaries, recent years saw South Indian actors, writers and directors from Telugu, Tamil, Malayalam, and Kannada industries collaborating with each other as a single 'South Indian Cinema' entity to produce movies. This collaboration resulted in major hits such as Enthiran series , Baahubali, KGF, Lokesh Cinematic Universe, Jailer, Lucifer, Pushpa, RRR, Kalki 2898 AD, Manjummel Boys, Kantara, Amaran and Salaar. Film analysts say that this marks the beginning of the unification of a Pan-Indian film industry as one. After the emergence of South Indian Cinema, Hindi film actors and actresses who experienced a decline in their star value began participating in South Indian films to sustain their acting careers.

== History ==
=== During the Madras Presidency ===
In 1897, a European exhibitor first screened a selection of silent short films at the Victoria Public Hall in Madras (Present-day Chennai). The films all featured non-fictional subjects; they were mostly photographed records of day-to-day events. In Madras (present-day Chennai), the Electric Theatre was established for the screening of silent films. It was a favourite haunt of the British community in Madras. The theatre was shut down after a few years. This building is now part of a post office complex on Anna Salai (Mount Road). The Lyric Theatre was also built in the Mount Road area. This venue boasted a variety of events, including plays in English, Western classical music concerts, and ballroom dances. Silent films were also screened as an additional attraction. Swamikannu Vincent, an employee of the South Indian Railways in Coimbatore, purchased a film projector and silent films from the Frenchman DuPont and set up a business as film exhibitor. He erected tents for screening films. His tent cinema became popular and he travelled throughout the state with his mobile unit. In later years, he produced talkies and also built a cinema in Coimbatore.

To celebrate the event of King George V's visit in 1909, a grand exhibition was organised in Madras. Its major attraction was the screening of short films accompanied by sound. A British company imported a Crone megaphone, made up of a film projector to which a gramophone with a disc containing prerecorded sound was linked, and both were run in unison, producing picture and sound simultaneously. However, there was no synched dialogue. Raghupathy Venkaiah Naidu, a successful photographer, took over the equipment after the exhibition and set up a tent cinema near the Madras High Court. R. Venkaiah, flush with funds, in 1912 built a permanent cinema in the Mount Road area named Gaiety Theatre. It was the first in Madras to screen films on a full-time basis. The theatre later closed for commercial developments.

Swamikannu Vincent, who had built the first cinema of South India in Coimbatore, introduced the concept of "Tent Cinema" in which a tent was erected on a stretch of open land close to a town or village to screen the films. The first of its kind was established in Madras, called "Edison's Grand Cinemamegaphone". This was due to the fact that electric carbons were used for motion picture projectors. Full-fledged film studios were built in Salem (Modern Theatres Studio) and Coimbatore (Central Studios, Neptune, and Pakshiraja). Chennai became the hub of studio activity with two more movie studios built in Chennai, Vijaya Vauhini Studios and Gemini Studios. Thus, with the undivided Madras Presidency, being the Capital to most of South India, Chennai became the center for South Indian language films.

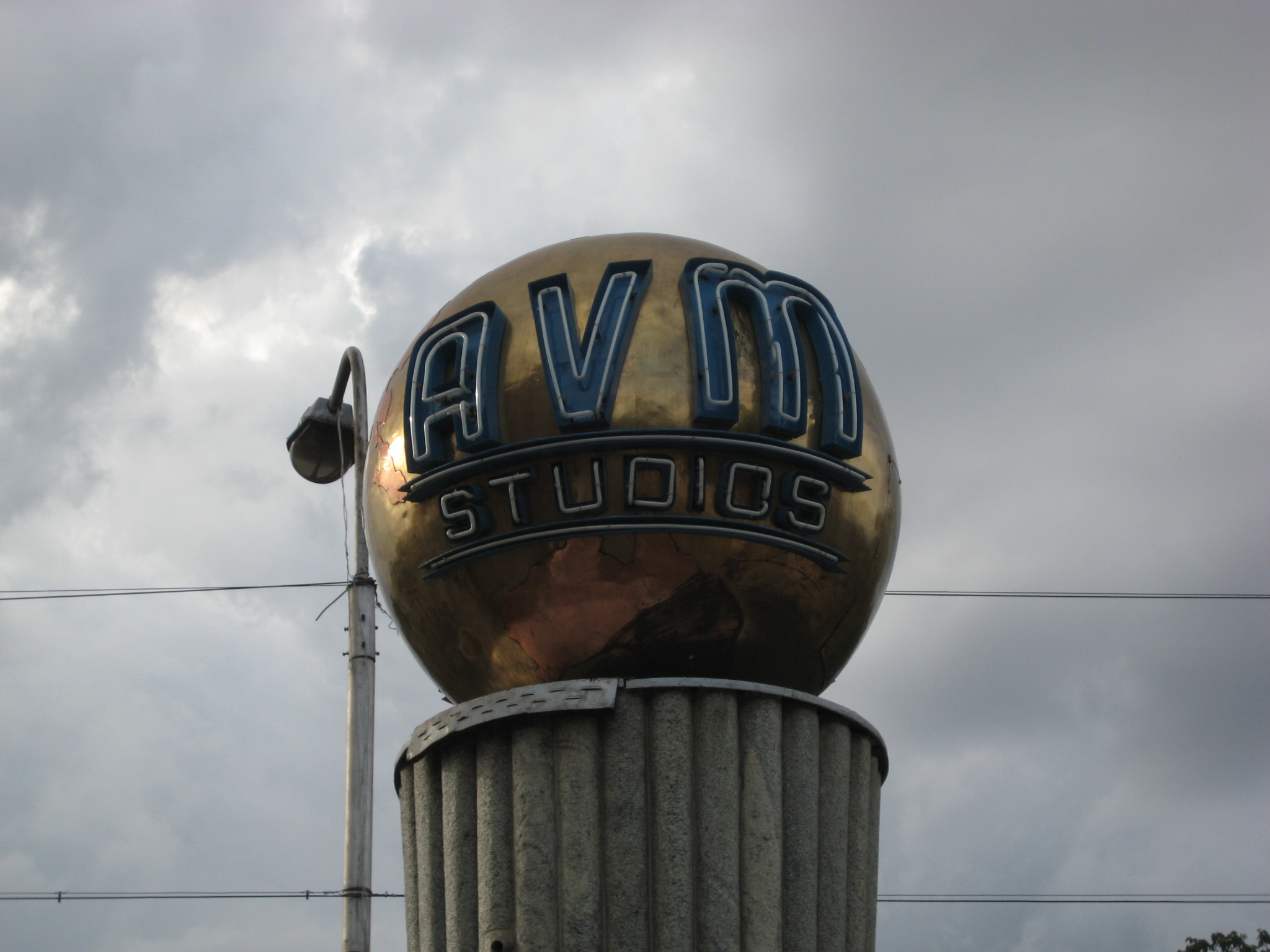
AVM studios in Chennai, the oldest surviving studio in India

=== First South Indian films ===
The first Madras production was Keechaka Vadham (The Destruction of Keechaka), produced and directed by R. Nataraja Mudaliar, who established the India Film Company Limited. During the 1920s, silent Tamil language films were shot at makeshift locations in and around Chennai, and for technical processing, they were sent to Pune or Calcutta. Later, some films featuring M. K. Thyagaraja Bhagavathar were shot in those cities as well. Telugu artists became active with the production of Bhisma Pratighna, a silent film, in 1921. The film was directed by Raghupathi Venkaiah Naidu and his son R. S. Prakash. The two, along with Yaragudipati Varada Rao, would go on to produce and direct dozens of films throughout the decade, casting theater actors in major roles. They established a long-lasting precedent of focusing exclusively on religious themes; Nandanar, Gajendra Moksham, and Matsyavatar, three of their most famous productions, centered on religious figures, parables, and morals.

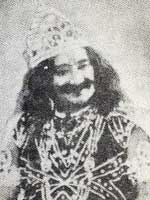
Bhakta Prahlada, a 1932 Telugu talkie film directed by H. M. Reddy

The first Tamil silent film, Keechaka Vadham, was made by R. Nataraja Mudaliar in 1918. The first talking motion picture, Kalidas, was a multilingual and was released on 31 October 1931, less than seven months after India's first talking motion picture Alam Ara. Popularly known as talkies, films with sound quickly grew in number and popularity. In 1934, the industry saw its first major commercial success with Lavakusa. Directed by C. Pullaiah and starring Parupalli Subbarao and Sriranjani, the film attracted unprecedented numbers of viewers to theaters and thrust the young film industry into mainstream culture.

During the same time, the first Kannada talkie, Sati Sulochana, appeared in theatres, followed by Bhakta Dhruva (aka Dhruva Kumar). Both Sati Sulochana and Bhakta Dhruva were major successes. But prospective filmmakers in Karnataka were handicapped by the lack of studios and technical crews. Sati Sulochana was shot in Kolhapur at the Chatrapathi studio; most filming, sound recording, and post-production was done in Madras. It was difficult, as well, to find financial backing for new film projects in the region; thus, very few movies in Kannada were released during the early years of Indian sound cinema. The first talkie in Malayalam was Balan, released in 1938. It was directed by S. Nottani with a screenplay and songs written by Muthukulam Raghavan Pillai. Malayalam films continued to be made mainly by Tamil producers until 1947, when the first major film studio, Udaya, was established in Alleppey, Kerala by Kunchacko, who earned fame as a film producer and director.

=== Social influence and rise of superstars ===
The Madras presidency was divided into linguistic States, known today as Karnataka, Kerala, Andhra Pradesh and Tamil Nadu. The division marked the beginning of a new era in South Indian cinema. Cinema was celebrated regionally and exclusively in the language of the respective State. By 1936, the mass appeal of film allowed directors to move away from religious and mythological themes. One such film, Jeevitha Nouka (1951), was a musical drama which spoke about the problems in a joint family. Earlier, dozens of 'social films', notably Prema Vijayam, Vandemataram and Maala Pilla, have been released in Telugu. Touching on societal problems like the status of Untouchables and the practice of giving dowry, Telugu films increasingly focused on contemporary living: 29 of the 96 films released between 1937 and 1947 had social themes. Attempts made by some Congress leaders in Tamil Nadu to use stars of Tamil cinema were limited since this media remained inaccessible to the rural population, who were in the majority. The politicizing of movies by the Congress virtually stopped soon after Indian Independence in 1947. With the introduction of electricity to rural areas in the 1950s Dravidian politicians could implement movies as a major political organ. Dravida Munnetra Kazhagam (DMK) was the first – and at the time the only – party to take advantage of visual movie media. Actors and writers of guerrilla theater, who were inspired by the ideologies of Periyar E. V. Ramasamy, brought the philosophies of Tamil nationalism and anti-Brahminism to celluloid media. The movies not only made direct references to the independent Dravida Nadu that its leaders preached for but also at many times displayed party symbols within the movie. When the DMK began using cinema for political purposes and actors like MGR and S. S. Rajendran rode into politics on their popularity as actors, Tamil cinema began to be noticed by academics, S.S.Rajendran, as a film actor, became the first elected 'Member of legislative assembly in the industry from Tamil Nadu.

Meanwhile, Tamil film Chandralekha crossed all language borders. It was the time, when M. G. Ramachandran became one of the most remembered actors of India. His popularity enabled him to found a political party, the All India Anna Dravida Munnetra Kazhagam, which is regularly part of the Government of Tamil Nadu. He posthumously won Bharat Ratna.

The time was hailed as "the period of giants" in Malayalam film industry, due to the work of film stars Sathyan and Prem Nazir. Nazir catapulted to the row of the finest actors of India with the film Iruttinte Athmavu (1967). Playing a demented youth – Velayadhan, Nazir discovered his prowess as a dramatic actor of great intensity. Many critics have evaluated this role as his masterpiece, and as one of the finest onscreen performances ever. He holds the record for having acted in the most leading roles – about 700 films. Another record is for the most enduring screen team along with actress Sheela. They played opposite each other in 130 movies. It was also the time when Rajkumar shot to fame. Rajkumar acted in more than 200 movies who also won National Awards for singing songs like "Naadamaya Ee Lokavella" from the movie Jeevana Chaitra. His film Bangaaradha Manushya created a record at the box office for successfully running in the main theaters for more than two continuous years. He later spearheaded the Kannada language movement, followed by millions of his fans, however the star remained away from politics.

== Characteristics and popularity ==
South Indian films, whether Kannada, Malayalam, Tamil, or Telugu, have been predominantly rooted in their specific geography. They tell stories that are in tune with the culture, dialect, politics, social structure, and lifestyle of the people in their respective regions. This can be seen in the films of Padmarajan or Bharathiraja that were set in the Malayali or Tamil milieu respectively. Similarly, K. Viswanath directed films based on arts — performing and visual, aesthetics, social structure and lifestyle of Telugu people. South Indian cinema has been able to find audiences across India, and even outside because of its ability to remain rooted in a certain milieu, while appealing to the collective "Indian" sensibility, whereas Hindi films, of late aren't able to strike this balance because of their essential non-rootedness. For many years, films in Hindi have gone urbane and elitist, while down South, they remained rooted in telling the stories of people in a way they can enjoy as their own.

Recent South Indian cinema sees a trend of violent heroes, deviating from virtuous protagonists of the past and embracing "bad boy" personas, with violence integrated into their characters gaining popularity. Directors, taking on quasi-action director roles, break from traditional templates, earning commendation for creativity. Despite critics questioning the rationale, the enduring appeal of violent scenes persists, driven by fans of star-centric films. The CBFC's inconsistent certification approach adds to ongoing discourse, reflecting changing preferences in the South Indian cinema landscape.

== See also ==
- Filmfare Awards South
- South Indian International Movie Awards
