= R. Nataraja Mudaliar =

Indian film director

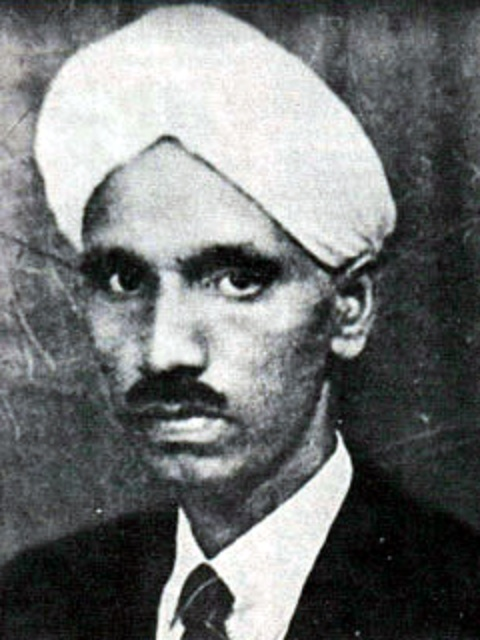
- Mudaliar, c. 1920s
- Born: 1885; Vellore, Madras Presidency, British India
- Died: May 2, 1971 (aged 85–86); Chennai, Tamil Nadu
- Occupations: Film Director, film Producer, writer, cinematographer

Rangaswamy Nataraja Mudaliar (1885–1971), was an Indian film director. Popularly known as the father of Tamil cinema, he was a pioneer in the production of silent films. Starting his career as an automobile spare parts merchant, he started the "Indian Film Company Limited" in Madras. In 1917, Mudaliar made Keechaka Vadham, South India's first silent film. Upon critical success of the film, he went on to produce films like Draupadhi Vastrapaharanam (1918), Lava Kusa (1919), Rukmini Satyabhama and Mayil Ravana. After the death of his son in a fire accident in 1923, Mudaliar retired from films.

== Early life ==
Rangaswamy Nataraja Mudaliar was born in 1885 in Vellore, Madras Presidency, British India into a wealthy Tamil Thuluva Vellala family. His father, Rangaswamy was a successful trader and one of his uncles was the legendary doctor of Madras, M. R. Gurusamy Mudaliar. After completing his schooling, Mudaliar came to Madras (now Chennai) to set up his business as the city was the capital of the province. Following that, he started a bicycle business named "Watson & Company" partnering with his cousin, S. M. Dharmalingam Mudaliar. The company sold cycles at ₹ 25. The business became successful as the partners acquired a foreign firm, "Romar Dan & Company" in 1911, that dealt with the import of American cars and automobile spare parts. Prior to that "Addison & Company" was the only company in Madras to sell American cars. Mudaliar sold the same cars as ₹ 1,000 and became the first Indian to sell American cars. Mudaliar had an early interest in photography this later evolved into "moving pictures".

== Film career ==
Mudaliar developed an interest for moving pictures after watching the films of Dadasaheb Phalke. At the time cinematographers from Britain were filming a documentary on Lord Curzon, then the Governor-General and Viceroy of India. Mudaliar was introduced to Stewart Smith, one of the cinematographers, and learned about the basics of photography in film-making through him. This eventually led to Mudaliar establishing his production house "India Film Company" in 1917. He brought together some of his business friends allowing them to invest on the production house and established South India's first studio on Miller's Road, Purasawalkam, Madras.

In 1917, Mudaliar started working on a film titled Keechaka Vadham and looked after the script, cinematography, editing, and direction apart from the production work. The film was over 6,000 feet long had the distinction of being the first silent film produced in South India. Upon release it was both critically acclaimed and commercially successful. The title cards of the film were in English and Tamil languages, written by Guruswamy Mudaliar, a famous doctor in Madras and Thiruvengada Mudaliar, a college principal. The titles in Hindi were written by Devdas Gandhi, son of Mahatma Gandhi. Keechaka Vadham was released in Elphinstone Theatre in January 1918. The success of the film prompted Mudaliar to make a series of historic films. Later a difference of opinion arose among him and the investors. The demise of his son in a fire accident that happened in his studio, led to Mudaliar retiring from film-making and close the studio. As a film-maker Mudaliar inspired Raghupathi Prakasa, son of Raghupathi Venkaiah Naidu and J. C. Daniel, who was later revered as the father of Malayalam cinema. He died on 2 May 1971.

== Filmography ==
- Keechaka Vadham
- Draupadi Vastrapaharanam
- Mahi Ravana
- Lava Kusa
- Kalinga Mardanam
- Rukmini Satyabhama
- Markandeya
