= Virata Parva =

Fourth book of the Mahabharata

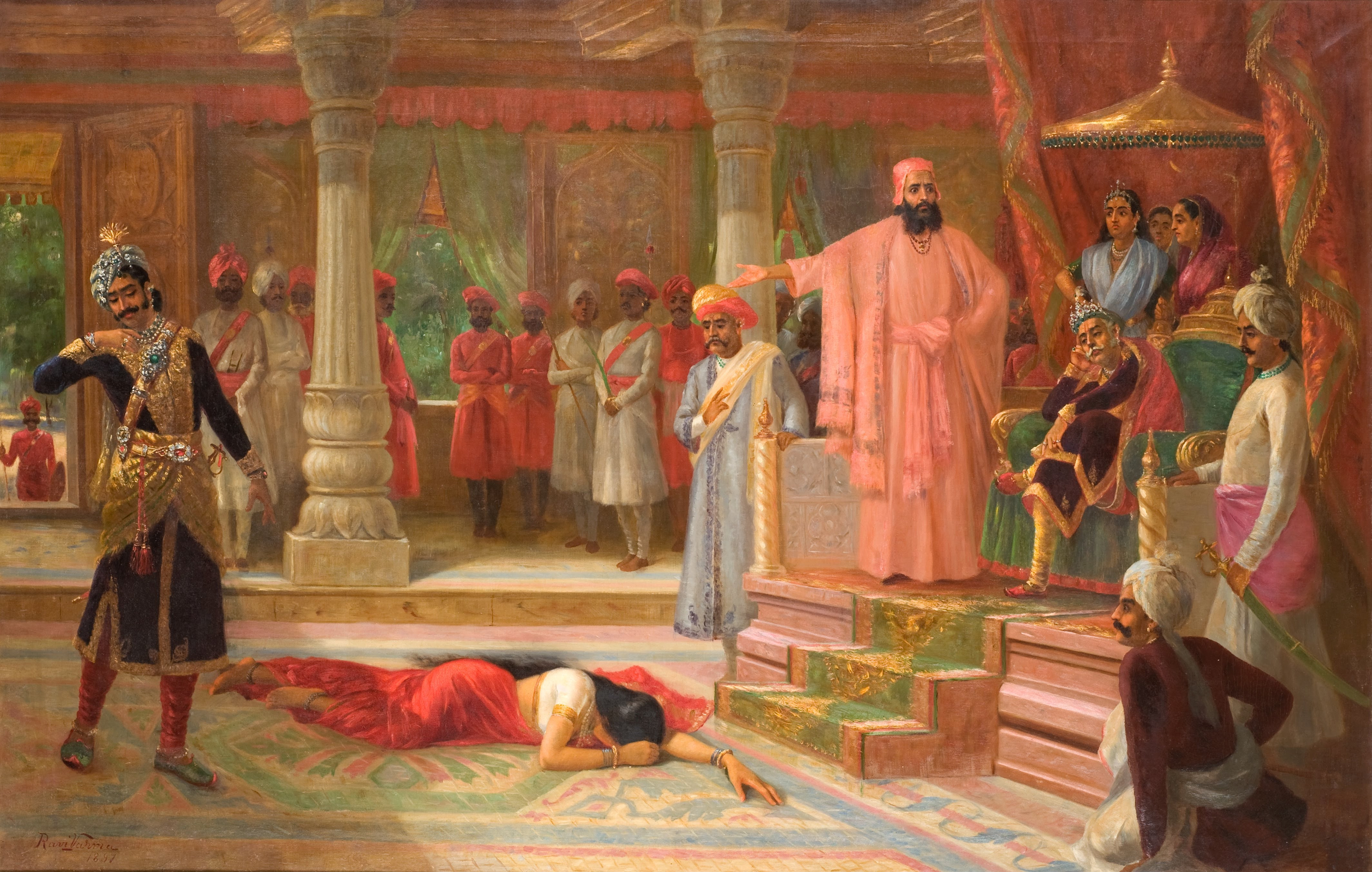
Kichaka (left) humiliates Sairandhri (Draupadi) in the court of Virata, a scene from the Virata Parva painted by Raja Ravi Varma

The Virata Parva ("Book of Virata") is the fourth of the eighteen parvas (books) of the Indian epic Mahabharata. Virata Parva traditionally has 4 parts and 72 chapters. The critical edition of Virata Parva has 4 parts and 67 chapters.

It discusses the 13th year of exile which the Pandavas must spend incognito to avoid another 12 years of exile in the forest. They do so in the court of Virata. They assume a variety of identities. Yudhishthira assumes the identity of game entertainer to the king and calls himself Kanka, Bhima of a cook Ballava, Arjuna teaches dance and music as eunuch Brihannala and dresses as a woman, Nakula tends horses as Granthika, Sahadeva herds cows as Tantipala, and Draupadi in the name of Malini went as Sairandhri to queen Shudeshna.

== Structure and chapters ==
The Virata Parva traditionally has 4 upa-parvas (parts, little books) and 72 adhyayas (chapters).

=== Pandava Pravesha Parva (chapters: 1–13) ===
The Pandavas discuss ways they can each conceal their identity for one year, and thus meet the pledge they made at the time of their exile. While Pandavas have grown up in a princely family, they must now assume non-princely professions to avoid being detected. If they are detected, the terms of their exile pledge would extend the exile by another 12 years. They chose to spend last year exile in King Virata kingdom in disguise. Yudhishthira presents himself to King as courtier, by the name of Kanka, Bhima as cook and wrestler by name Vallaba, Arjuna dresses up in a saree as neuter by the name of Brihannala, Nakula as keeper of horses by name Granthika, Sahadeva as keeper of kine by name Tantipala, and Draupadi as female artisan by name Sairandhri. The parva describes Pandavas' life as workers in Virata's kingdom, with king Virata as a famous cow baron. Chapter 13 is sometimes named Samayapalana Parva.

=== Kichaka-vadha Parva (chapters: 14–24) ===
Kichaka, the commander of king Virata's forces, sees maid Sairandhri (incognito Draupadi), lusts for her. Kichaka approaches the queen, and inquires about Sairandhri. The queen does not know the true identity of Sairandhri, and arranges a meeting. Sairandhri informs Kichaka that she is married, and his stalking of her is inappropriate and against Dharma. Kichaka offers her release from being a maid and a life of luxury. Sairandhri says it is wrong for him to continue pursuing her. Kichaka gets desperate, desires Sairandhri even more. Queen Shudeshna asks Sairandhri to go get wine for her from Kichaka's house. Sairindhri goes in fear to Kichaka house to get wine. Kichaka meets her there, tries to molest her, Sairandhri pushes him and runs to the court of king Virata. Kichaka chases her, catches and kicks her in the court of Virata in front of the king. Sairandhri (Draupadi) demands justice from the king. Virata and Kanka (Yudhishthira) console Sairandhri, promise due investigation of all facts and then justice. Sairandhri, upset with her humiliation, the delay in justice, scolds both the king and Kanka. The queen learns about the mistreatment of Sairindhri, promises death to Kichaka. Draupadi meets Bhima, describes her humiliation by Kichaka, as well as how frustrated she has been with the 12 years of exile, for suffering the vice of her husband Yudhishthira. Draupadi explains why Kichaka is evil, explains she repeatedly rejected Kichaka, and demands Kichaka's death. Next day, Kichaka again approaches maid Sairandhri, and harasses her. Sairandhri asks him to meet her at a hiding place. Bhima meets Kichaka instead, and kills Kichaka. Friends and family of Kichaka blame maid Sairandhri, for Kichaka's death, catch her and try to burn her to death. Bhima gets upset, attacks and kills all those trying to burn Sairandhri. Draupadi is saved. The story presents the interconnectedness of crime to people related to the victim and the perpetrator, their emotions and how people take sides. Kichaka story from the Mahabharata is one of those that is dramatized in Indian classical dances, such as Kathakali.

=== Go-harana Parva (chapters: 25–69) ===
Dhritarashtra and Duryodhana disclose their spies have been looking for Pandavas in forests, villages, provinces and cities, unsuccessfully. Two more weeks are left of the 13th year of exile. Karna suggests they hire more competent spies, fan inside their kingdom, in holy places among ascetics, and in distant kingdoms. Drona recommends that instead of sending spies, Dhritarashtra should seek peace and welcome the Pandavas. Bhishma agrees with Drona, counsels Dhritarashtra to find the brothers where they are likely to be and bring them back. Bhishma speculates that the good and high souled people like Pandava brothers always create prosperity, peace, cheer and health of all creatures wherever they go. Look for them in places where prosperity and cheer has recently increased. Kripa agrees with Bhishma speculation, but suggests Dhritarashtra to prepare for war to kill Pandavas, as they are likely to be weak and without soldiers at the end of the exile. Susharma, the king of Trigartas, present during this discussion, suggests Virata kingdom fits this profile. Susharma recommends an attack on the Virata's kingdom of Matsya, seizure of its wealth of kine (cows) and recent prosperity. The army of Susharma attack Matsya, loot his kine and wealth, take king Virata captive. Bhima recommends immediate retaliation and war. Yudhishthira recommends caution and careful response. Bhima frees Virata, takes injured Susharma captive. Yudhishthira recommends that Susharma - the prisoner of war - be forgiven and freed, not killed. Virata, accompanied with Yudhishthira and Bhima, leaves his kingdom to bring back the kine and wealth from Susharma. Duryodhana surmises that the Pandavas were hiding in Matsya. A host of Kaurava warriors attack Virata, presumably to steal their cattle, but in reality, desiring to pierce the Pandavas' veil of anonymity. Full of bravado, Virata's son Uttar attempts to take on the army by himself while the rest of the Matsya army has been lured away to fight Susharma and the Trigartas. As suggested by Draupadi, Uttar takes Brihannala with him, as his charioteer. When he sees the Kaurava army, Uttar loses his nerve and attempts to flee. There, Arjuna reveals his identity and those of his brothers'. Switching places with Uttar, Arjuna takes up the Gandiva and Devadatta. Eager to defend the land that had given him refuge, Arjuna engaged the legion of Kaurava warriors. All the warriors including Bhishma, Drona, Karna, Kripa and Ashwatthama together attacked Arjuna to defeat him. However Arjuna defeat all of those warriors. However Karna pierced the Arjuna's chariot horses and struck the Arjuna's flagstaff and Ashwatthama cuts the string of Gandiva while fighting with Arjuna. Arjuna invoked Sammohana Astra which made all of them fall asleep. Uttar asked Arjuna why he couldn't have killed them instead of making them fall-sleep. Arjuna then told Uttara that clothes of dead people would become unholy. Arjuna asked Uttar to collect their clothes for Uttarā (his sister) to decorate her dolls. He asked Uttara to collect Duryodhana's red clothes; Karna's pink colored and Dushasana's blue colored clothes. Prince Uttara returns victorious with wealth and Arjuna. When the news of prince Uttara victory heard by King, he became filled with joy and played game of dice with Kanka. Kanka began to applaud prowess of Vrihannala (Arjuna) for the victory of his son. King Virata inflamed with anger forcibly struck Yudhishthira in the face with a dice, and went away. Thus struck, blood began to flow from his nose. Yudhisthira held his nose and cleanses it with water with the help of Draupadi. Meanwhile Uttara returns to give his victory news in the court to the King, where Arjuna was held from entering by a guard as per Yudhishthira words as he could get angry at the insult of his brother and could slay the King with his troops. Uttara criticizes his father's act and the King asks for forgiveness.

=== Vaivahika Parva (chapters: 70–72) ===
On 3rd day after Virata victory, attired in costly robes Pandavas entered the council-hall of Virata and took their seat on the thrones reserved for Kings. Virata came there for holding his council and beholding his courtiers occupying royal seat, filled with wrath. Arjuna discloses to king Virata that he and his Pandava brothers have been in his kingdom in disguise, over the 13th year of their exile. Virata asks for forgiveness and gives his daughter, princess Uttarā hand to Arjuna's son Abhimanyu.

== English translations ==
Several translations of the Sanskrit book Virata Parva in English are available. Two translations from 19th century, now in public domain, are those by Kisari Mohan Ganguli and Manmatha Nath Dutt. The translations vary with each translator's interpretations.

J. A. B. van Buitenen completed an annotated edition of Virata Parva, based on critically edited and least corrupted version of Mahabharata known in 1975. Debroy, in 2011, notes that updated critical edition of Virata Parva, with spurious and corrupted text removed, has 4 parts, 67 adhyayas (chapters) and 1,736 shlokas (verses). Debroy's translation of a critical edition of Virata Parva appears in Volume 4 of his series.

Clay Sanskrit Library has published a 15-volume set of the Mahabharata that includes a translation of Virata Parva by Kathleen Garbutt. This translation is modern and uses an old manuscript of the Epic. The translation does not remove verses and chapters now widely believed to be spurious and smuggled into the Epic in 1st or 2nd millennium CE.

The entire parva has been "transcreated" and translated in verse by the poet Dr. Purushottama Lal published by Writers Workshop.

== Scholarly reception ==
In the 2nd-century CE Spitzer Manuscript found in Kizil Caves, which includes a table of contents of the Mahabharata, there is no mention of the Virata Parva and Anushasana Parva. However, this methodology to consider the Parva as later additions to the epic, isn't widely supported by all scholars and has been criticised. Moreover, the Parva is the consistent part of the Mahabharata and has also been included in the Mainstream Critical edition prepared by BORI forming an integral part of the Mahabharata.

== Quotations and teachings ==
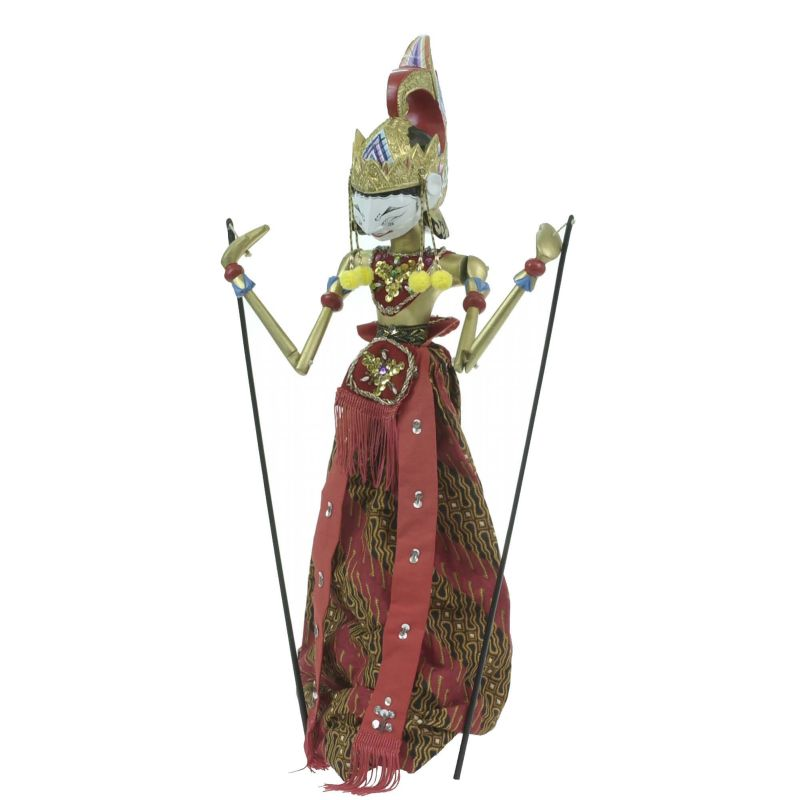
Abhimanyu marries princess Uttarā in Virata Parva. Their story is often displayed in traditional Wayang (puppet, pop and theatre) in the Hindu culture found in Bali and pockets of Java, Indonesia.

Pandava Pravesha Parva, Chapter 4:

A wise man should never contract friendship with the wife of the king nor with other attendants of his, nor with those whom he despises and who are hostile to him.

— Pandava Pravesha Parva, Virata Parva, Mahabharata Book iv.4.19

Pandava Pravesha Parva, Chapter 14:

Tell me, O lady, who is this bewitching girl of fine beauty, endued with the grace of a goddess, and whose she is and where she comes from. She has brought me to subjection by grinding my heart. I think there is no other medicine to heal me, except her.

— Kichaka lusting for Draupadi, Pandava Pravesha Parva, Virata Parva, Mahabharata Book iv.14.8

Kichaka-vadha Parva, Chapter 21:

That wicked-souled Kichaka is war like, proud, outrager of female modesty and engrossed in all objects of pleasure. He steals money from the king. He extorts money from others, even if they cry in woe; he never stays in paths of rectitude nor does he even feel inclined to virtue. He is wicked-souled, of sinful disposition, impudent, villaneous and afflicted by Cupid's shaft. Although I have repeatedly rejected him, he will, I am sure, outrage me, whenever he happens to see me.

— Draupadi explaining her case against Kichaka, Kichaka-badha Parva, Virata Parva, Mahabharata Book iv.21.36-39

Go-harana Parva, Chapter 38:

Uttara said: Let the Kurus take away the profuse riches of the Matsyas as they like; let men and women laugh at me, O Vrihannala. Let the kine go any where, let my city be desolate, let me fear my father, but I shall not enter into battle.
Vrihannala said: To fly is not the practice of the brave; death in battle is preferable to flight in fear.

— Vrihannala (incognito Arjuna) and Prince Uttara fearful of war, Go-harana Parva, Virata Parva, Mahabharata Book iv.38.26-29

== See also ==
- Previous book of Mahabharata: Vana Parva
- Next book of Mahabharata: Udyoga Parva
