= Kalanilayam Balakrishnan =

Indian actor-dancer

Kalanilayam Balakrishnan (also known as Kochu Balan and Balasan) is an actor-dancer, scholar and a teacher of Kathakali, a theatre-dance of Kerala in South India.

== Biography ==
In 1965 at the age of 13, Balakrishnan began his Kathakali training at the Unnayi Warrier Smaraka Kalanilayam at Irinjalakkuda in Thrissur district of Kerala. He has received traditional Kathakali training from Palluppuram Gopalan Nair, Keezhpadam Kumaran Nair, Kalamandalam Kuttan, and Kalanilayam Raghavan. Since 1982, he has been serving as the principal teacher with Sadanam Kathakali Academy in Kerala.
