= List of Tamil music directors =

In this list of directors of ethnic Tamil origin, the names are ordered by the musicians' first or stage name.

- A. M. Rajah
- A. R. Rahman
- A. R. Reihana
- Anirudh Ravichander
- Aruldev
- Bharani
- Bharathwaj
- Bhavatharini
- Black Pandi
- C. Sathya
- D. Imman
- Darbuka Siva
- Deva
- Devan Ekambaram
- Dharan Kumar
- Dhina
- G. V. Prakash Kumar
- Gangai Amaren
- Ghibran
- Harris Jayaraj
- Hiphop Tamizha
- Ilayaraaja
- James Vasanthan
- Jassie Gift
- Joshua Sridhar
- Justin Prabhakaran
- K
- K. Bhagyaraj
- K. V. Mahadevan
- Karthik
- Karthik Raja
- Karunaas
- Kuralarasan
- Leon James
- M. M. Keeravani
- M. S. Viswanathan
- N. R. Raghunanthan
- Nivas Prasanna
- ofRo
- Pravin Mani
- Premji Amaren
- R. P. Patnaik
- Raj–Koti
- Raleigh Rajan
- S. A. Rajkumar
- Sai Abhyankkar
- Salil Chowdhry
- Sam CS
- Santhosh Dhayanidhi
- Santhosh Narayanan
- Sean Roldan
- Shankar Mahadevan
- Shankar–Ganesh
- Sid Sriram
- Siddharth Vipin
- Silambarasan
- Simon K. King
- Sirpi
- Srikanth Deva
- Srinivas
- Sundar C. Babu
- T. M. Soundararajan
- T. Rajendar
- Thaman
- Vidyasagar
- Vijay Antony
- Vivek-Mervin
- Yuvan Shankar Raja
