= Kichaka =

Character from the Hindu epic Mahabharata

- Mahabharata character
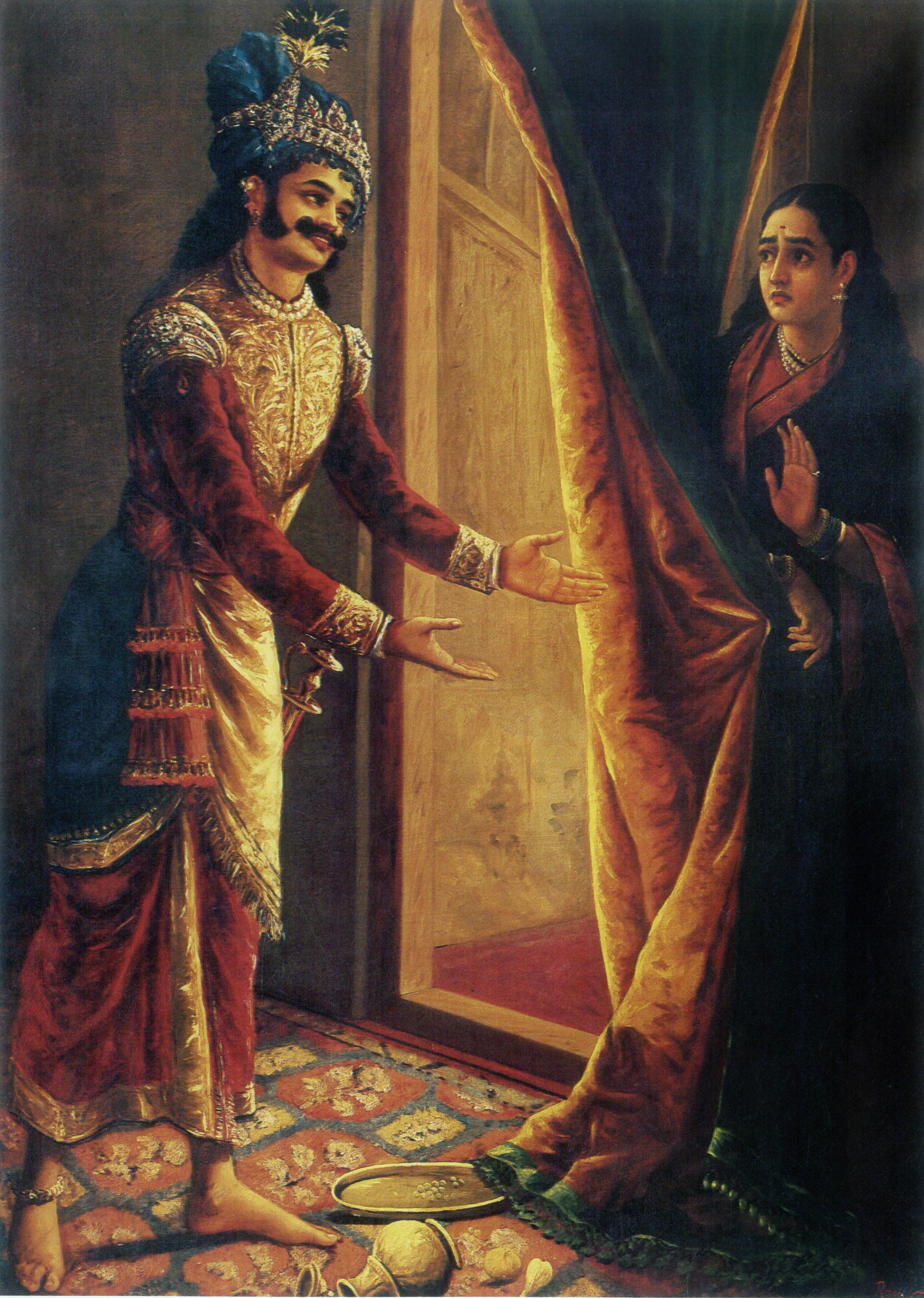
- Keechak tries to molest Sairandhri (Draupadi), painting by Raja Ravi Varma.

Information
- Family: Sūta king of Kekaya (father); Malavi (mother); Sudeshna (elder sister); Upa-Kichaka (younger brothers)
- Relatives: Virata (brother-in-law); Uttara, Uttarā, and Shankha (nephew - niece)
- Origin: Kekaya
- Home: Matsya Kingdom

Kichaka (Sanskrit: कीचक, romanized: Kīcaka) is a character in the Mahabharata, who served as the commander-in-chief of King Virata's army in the Matsya Kingdom. He was the son of Sūta king of the Kekaya and Malavi, and had 105 younger brothers known as the Upa-Kichakas. His sister, Sudeshna, was married to King Virata, and Kichaka lived in the Virata palace after her marriage. Renowned for his strength and military prowess, Kichaka had frequently defeated King Susharman of Trigarta in battle and is described to wield more authority than Virata himself. His story is most notable for his encounter with Draupadi during the Pandavas' incognito stay in Matsya. After repeatedly harassing Draupadi, he was killed by her husband Bhima, who crushed him to death.

== Literary background ==
The Mahabharata, one of the Sanskrit epics from the Indian subcontinent, other being the Ramayana. It mainly narrates the events and aftermath of the Kurukshetra War, a war of succession between two groups of princely cousins, the Kauravas and the Pandavas. The work is written in Classical Sanskrit and is a composite work of revisions, editing and interpolations over many centuries. The oldest parts in the surviving version of the text may date to near 400 BCE.

The Mahabharata manuscripts exist in numerous versions, wherein the specifics and details of major characters and episodes vary, often significantly. Except for the sections containing the Bhagavad Gita which is remarkably consistent between the numerous manuscripts, the rest of the epic exists in many versions. The differences between the Northern and Southern recensions are particularly significant, with the Southern manuscripts more profuse and longer. Scholars have attempted to construct a critical edition, relying mostly on a study of the "Bombay" edition, the "Poona" edition, the "Calcutta" edition and the "south Indian" editions of the manuscripts. The most accepted version is one prepared by scholars led by Vishnu Sukthankar at the Bhandarkar Oriental Research Institute, preserved at Kyoto University, Cambridge University and various Indian universities.

== Legend ==
=== Birth and early life ===
Kichaka was the son of King Kekaya, a ruler from Sutas class, and Queen Malavi. Kichaka had 105 younger brothers, collectively known as the Upa-Kichakas, and one sister, Sudeshna. According to the Southern Recension of the Mahabharata, Kichaka and his brothers were believed to be born from an aspect of Bana, the eldest of the Kalakeya Asuras, known for their great strength and demonic lineage. Sudeshna married King Virata, ruler of Matsya, and following her marriage, Kichaka and his brothers also moved to Virata's palace. There, Kichaka rose to become the commander-in-chief of Virata's army. He earned a reputation as a formidable warrior by repeatedly defeating King Susharman of the neighboring kingdom of Trigarta.

=== The year of incognito ===
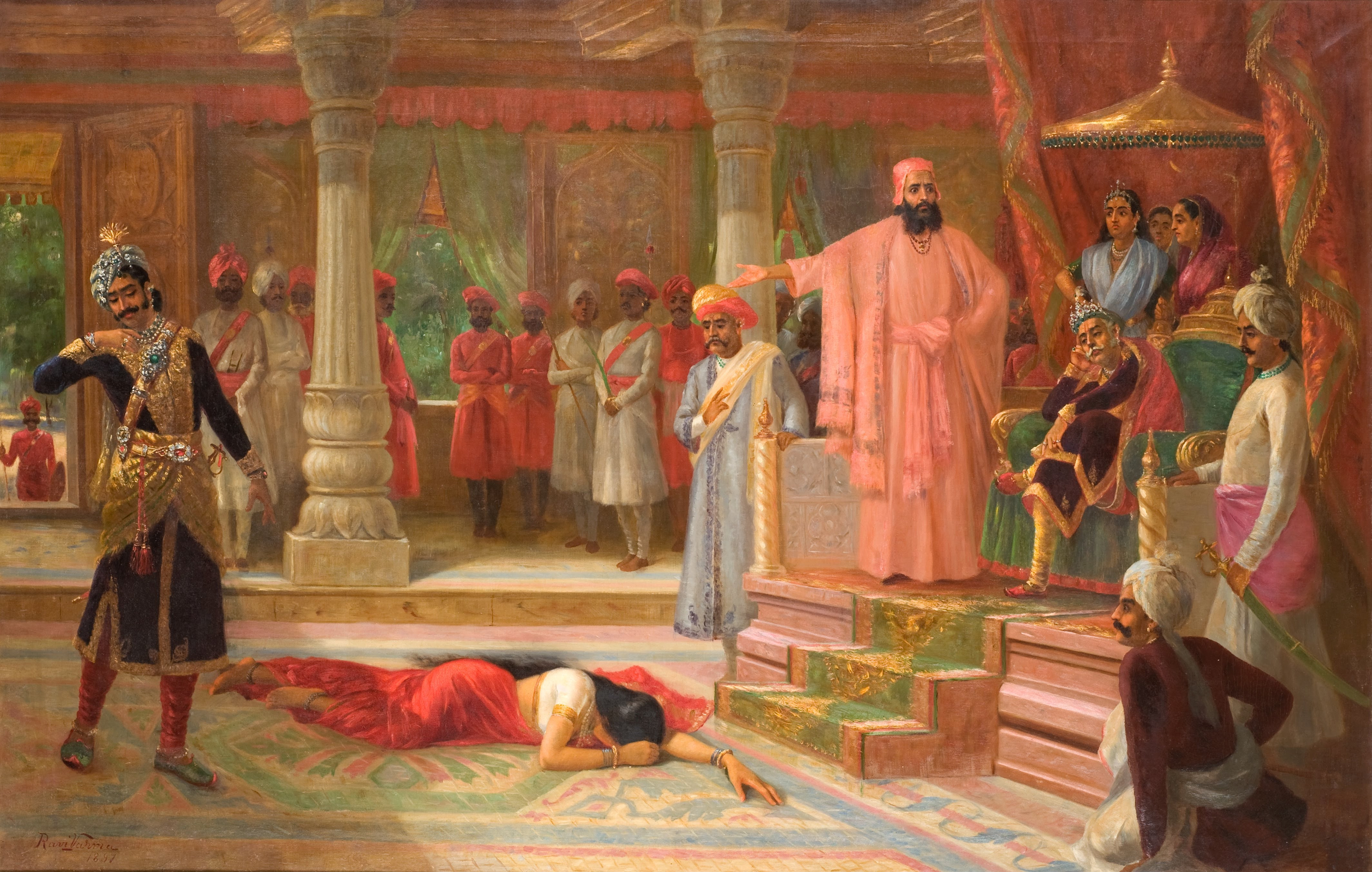
Kichaka (left) kicks Draupadi in the royal court of Virata, painting by Raja Ravi Varma

During their exile, the Pandavas spent their thirteenth year incognito at the court of King Virata. To remain hidden, they took on various disguises and occupations. Draupadi, the wife of the Pandavas, assumed the name Malini and served as a Sairandhri (maid and chaperone) to Queen Sudeshna. When Kichaka first saw Malini (Draupadi), he became infatuated with her beauty. Despite repeated attempts to win her affection, Draupadi rejected his advances, warning him that she was already married to gandharva (celestial musician). Kichaka then sought the help of his sister, Sudeshna, who reluctantly agreed to assist him. On the New Moon day, Sudeshna asked Malini to deliver a plate of food and wine to Kichaka. Though hesitant, Draupadi followed the queen's orders.

In his chambers, Kichaka approaches Draupadi with lustful intentions. Offering her gifts, he invites her to sit with him, but Draupadi, maintaining composure, tries to leave, but Kichaka grabs her arm and attempts to detain her. Draupadi rebukes him, asserting her loyalty to her husbands and predicting his downfall. As she tries to escape, Kichaka seizes her garment and pulls her down. Enraged, Draupadi throws him to the ground, but he regains his footing, chases her into the royal court, and humiliates her by kicking her in front of King Virata and his courtiers, including her disguised husband Yudhishthira (who was disguised as a courtier at that time). Neither Yudhishthira nor King Virata could react because Kichaka wielded so much power within the kingdom. Draupadi's cries for help summoned a guardian spirit (Rakshasa) tasked with protecting her, who intervened, shoving Kichaka forcefully and rendering him unconscious.

=== Death ===
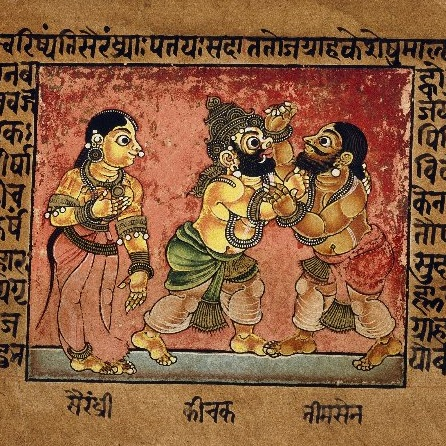
Bhima and Kichaka fight, while Draupadi watches them, manuscript folio

Devastated and humiliated by Kichaka's assault, Draupadi went to Bhima and recounted the entire ordeal. Bhima, enraged by her suffering, vowed to punish Kichaka. He instructed Draupadi to invite Kichaka to a clandestine meeting at the royal dancing hall that night. Bhima planned to lie in wait, disguised in Draupadi's place. As planned, Kichaka arrived at the hall at midnight, expecting to meet Draupadi. In the dim light, he mistook Bhima for her. As he leaned in to kiss what he believed was Draupadi, Bhima sprang to life and seized Kichaka in his iron grip. In a violent struggle, Bhima crushed Kichaka to death, shattering his bones and ending his life.

The next morning, Kichaka's brothers, the Upa-Kichakas, discovered his lifeless body. Enraged, they vowed to avenge his death. Believing Draupadi to be responsible, they abducted her with the intention of burning her alive on Kichaka's funeral pyre. Hearing Draupadi's desperate cries for help, Bhima rushed to the cremation ground. In a fierce battle, he single-handedly killed all 105 Upa-Kichakas, rescuing Draupadi from certain death. Following the massacre, Kichaka and his brothers were cremated together in the presence of King Virata and the court.

== See also ==
- Bheema
